= Greatest Hits (Ten Years and Change 1979–1991) =

Greatest hits album by Starship
- Released: May 14, 1991
- Genres: Rock, pop
- Length: 53:20
- Label: RCA Records
- Producer: Various

Starship chronology
Love Among the Cannibals (1989)	Greatest Hits (Ten Years and Change 1979–1991) (1991)	Loveless Fascination (2013)

Singles from Greatest Hits
- 1. "Good Heart" Released: April 19, 1991

Professional ratings
Review scores
Source	Rating
AllMusic	4/5 stars

Greatest Hits (Ten Years and Change 1979–1991) is a compilation album released in 1991 when Starship ended its recording contract with RCA Records. The album contains two new tracks, "Don't Lose Any Sleep" and "Good Heart". "Good Heart" was released as a single and hit number 81 on the Billboard charts. A third track, "Keys to the City" was recorded at this time and finally saw release on the 2012 compilation Playlist: The Very Best of Starship. "We Built This City" was remixed for this compilation by Bill Bottrel who took out the spoken-word interlude by Les Garland.

== Singles / music videos ==
- "Good Heart" (1991) No. 81 US

== Track listing ==
No.	Title	Lyrics	Music	Producer(s)	Length
1.	"Jane" (from Freedom at Point Zero)	David Freiberg; Jim McPherson	Freiberg; McPherson; Paul Kantner; Craig Chaquico	Ron Nevison	4:11
2.	"Find Your Way Back" (from Modern Times)	Chaquico	Chaquico; Tom Borsdorf	Nevison	4:16
3.	"Stranger" (from Modern Times)	Jeannette Sears	Pete Sears	Nevison	4:44
4.	"No Way Out" (from Nuclear Furniture)	Ina Wolf	Peter Wolf	Nevison	4:24
5.	"Layin' It on the Line" (from Nuclear Furniture)	Mickey Thomas; Chaquico	Chaquico; Thomas	Nevison	4:09
6.	"Don't Lose Any Sleep"	Diane Warren	Warren	Nevison	4:22
7.	"We Built This City" (Edited Remix, LP Version on Knee Deep in the Hoopla)	Bernie Taupin; Martin Page; Dennis Lambert; P. Wolf	Martin Page	P. Wolf	4:38
8.	"Sara" (from Knee Deep in the Hoopla)	I. Wolf	P. Wolf	P. Wolf	4:48
9.	"Nothing's Gonna Stop Us Now" (from No Protection)	Albert Hammond; Warren	Hammond; Warren	Narada Michael Walden	4:30
10.	"It's Not Over ('Til It's Over)" (from No Protection)	Robbie Nevil	John Van Tongeren; Phil Galdston	Keith Olsen	4:17
11.	"It's Not Enough" (from Love Among the Cannibals)	Page; Tommy Funderburk	Page	Mike Shipley; Larry Klein	4:49
12.	"Good Heart"	Page	Page	P. Wolf	4:22
Total length:					53:20

== Personnel ==
- Previous material from Freedom at Point Zero, Modern Times, Nuclear Furniture, Knee Deep in the Hoopla, No Protection, and Love Among the Cannibals

Don't Lose Any Sleep

- Mickey Thomas – vocals
- Craig Chaquico – guitars

Good Heart

- Mickey Thomas – lead vocals
- Peter Wolf – keyboards, electronics
- Martin Page – background vocals
- Peter Maunu – guitars

=== Production ===
- Ron Nevison – producer and engineer on "Don't Lose Any Sleep"
- Peter Wolf – producer on "Good Heart"
- Paul Erickson – engineer on "Good Heart"
- Brian Malouf – mixing engineer on "Good Heart"
- "Don't Lose Any Sleep" recorded 1990 at Record Plant, Hollywood, CA and Studio D Recording, Sausalito, CA
- "Good Heart" recorded 1991 at Embassy Studios, Simi Valley, CA
- Ria Lewerke – art direction
- Jacqueline Murphy – design
- Stanley Mouse – illustration
- Bill Thompson – management
- Linda Lalli – assistant to manager

== Certifications ==
Region	Certification	Certified units/sales
United States (RIAA)	Gold	500,000^{^}
^{^} Shipments figures based on certification alone.
