= Starship discography =

Cataloging of published recordings by the American rock band Starship

- Studio albums: 4
- Compilation albums: 6
- Singles: 16
- Music videos: 8

The following is a comprehensive discography of Starship, an American rock band which spun off from Jefferson Starship in 1985.

== Albums ==
=== Studio albums ===
Title	Album details	Peak chart positions										Certifications
Title	Album details	US	AUS	CAN	GER	NED	NZ	NOR	SWE	SWI	UK	Certifications
Knee Deep in the Hoopla	Released: September 10, 1985; Label: Grunt/RCA	7	34	15	45	65	43	—	22	29	—	US: Platinum; CAN: Platinum
No Protection	Released: July 6, 1987; Label: Grunt/RCA	12	43	12	20	64	—	6	7	11	26	US: Gold; CAN: Gold; NZ: Gold
Love Among the Cannibals	Released: August 15, 1989; Label: RCA	64	—	80	—	—	—	—	26	—	—	
Loveless Fascination	Released: September 17, 2013; Label: Loud and Proud	—	—	—	—	—	—	—	—	—	—	
"—" denotes releases that did not chart or were not released in that territory.

=== Compilation albums ===
Title	Album details
Greatest Hits (Ten Years and Change 1979–1991)	Released: May 1991; Label: RCA; RIAA: Gold
The Best of Starship	Released: April 1993; Label: RCA/BMG
>Jefferson Airplane>>Jefferson Starship>>Starship: Hits (import)	Released: 1998; Label: BMG
Forever Gold (Note: Released by St. Clair Entertainment, under license, with no personnel listed. Re-recordings in 2002 of Jefferson Starship or Starship songs on which Mickey Thomas originally appeared. These recordings have been licensed to several labels, resulting in the release of Starship: Greatest Hits (Delta Records) and Starship: Greatest Hits (Brilliant Records). The original release of these recordings was as Starship: Greatest and Latest, available outside the U.S. only, and including both a CD and DVD.)	Released: January 2003; Label: Delta/Brilliant
Platinum and Gold Collection	Released: July 2004; Label: RCA/BMG
Playlist: The Very Best of Starship	Released: November 2012; Label: RCA
Starship Enterprise: The Best of Jefferson Starship and Starship	Released: February 2019; Label: Rhino Entertainment
Starship: Greatest Hits Relaunched	Released: October 2021; Label: Purple Pyramid

== Singles ==
Title	Year	Peak chart positions											Certifications	Album
Title	Year	US	AUS	AUT	CAN	BEL	GER	IRE	NED	NZ	SWI	UK	Certifications	Album
"We Built This City"	1985	1	1	21	1	17	10	9	21	11	8	12	CAN: Gold; UK: 2× Platinum; US: Gold	Knee Deep in the Hoopla
"Sara"	1985	1	10	15	1	21	15	19	43	16	9	66		Knee Deep in the Hoopla
"Tomorrow Doesn't Matter Tonight"	1986	26	—	—	—	—	—	—	—	—	—	—		Knee Deep in the Hoopla
"Before I Go"	1986	68	—	—	72	—	—	—	—	—	—	—		Knee Deep in the Hoopla
"Nothing's Gonna Stop Us Now"	1987	1	3	3	1	5	3	1	8	21	4	1	CAN: Gold; UK: Platinum; US: Gold	No Protection
"It's Not Over ('Til It's Over)"	1987	9	92	—	23	33	57	—	90	—	—	86		No Protection
"Beat Patrol"	1987	46	—	—	—	—	—	—	—	—	—	—		No Protection
"Set the Night to Music"	1988	—	—	—	92	—	—	—	—	—	—	—		No Protection
"Wild Again"	1988	73	—	—	—	—	—	—	—	—	—	—		Love Among the Cannibals
"It's Not Enough"	1989	12	163	—	19	—	—	—	—	—	—	87		Love Among the Cannibals
"I Didn't Mean to Stay All Night"	1989	75	—	—	—	—	—	—	—	—	—	—		Love Among the Cannibals
"Good Heart"	1991	81	—	—	—	—	—	—	—	—	—	—		Greatest Hits (Ten Years and Change 1979–1991)
"Get Out Again"	2007	—	—	—	—	—	—	—	—	—	—	—		Non-album single
"It's Not the Same as Love"	2013	—	—	—	—	—	—	—	—	—	—	—		Loveless Fascination
"We Dream in Color"	2014	—	—	—	—	—	—	—	—	—	—	—		Love Among the Cannibals
"My Woman"	2016	—	—	—	—	—	—	—	—	—	—	—		Non-album single
"—" denotes releases that did not chart or were not released in that territory.

== Other appearances ==
Year	Work	Song	Comment
1985	Heart	"What About Love"	Backing vocals from Slick and Thomas
1986	Youngblood	"Cut You Down to Size"	featured on soundtrack (Thomas also recorded "Stand in the Fire")
1987	Mannequin	"Nothing's Gonna Stop Us Now"	featured on soundtrack
1988	Cocktail	"Wild Again"	featured on soundtrack
1989	Gross Anatomy	"I'll Be There"	featured on soundtrack
1991	Greatest Hits (Ten Years and Change 1979–1991)	"Don't Lose Any Sleep" and "Good Heart"	new songs
1999	The Best of Grace Slick	"Do You Remember Me?"	outtake from Knee Deep in the Hoopla
1999	Knee Deep in the Hoopla reissue	"Casualty"	outtake from original album
2011	The Muppets	"We Built This City"	featured on soundtrack
2012	Playlist: The Very Best of Starship	"Keys to the City" and "Karma (Everything You Do)"	Greatest Hits outtake and a new recording, respectively

== Videos ==
=== Music videos ===
Title	Release	Director	Album
"We Built This City"	1985	Francis Delia	Knee Deep in the Hoopla
"Sara"	1985	Francis Delia	Knee Deep in the Hoopla
"Tomorrow Doesn't Matter Tonight"	1986	Jerry Kramer	Knee Deep in the Hoopla
"Nothing's Gonna Stop Us Now"	1987		No Protection
"It's Not Over ('Til It's Over)"	1987	Jim Yukich	No Protection
"Beat Patrol"	1987	Jim Yukich	No Protection
"It's Not Enough"	1989		Love Among the Cannibals
"I Didn't Mean to Stay All Night"	1989		Love Among the Cannibals
