= Nothing's Gonna Stop Me Now =

Nothing's Gonna Stop Me Now may refer to:

- "Nothing's Gonna Stop Me Now" (Samantha Fox song), 1987
- "Nothing's Gonna Stop Me Now" (Perfect Strangers song), the theme song of Perfect Strangers, U.S. TV series, sung by David Pomeranz
- "Nothing's Gonna Stop Me Now", interlude from P. Diddy's album, The Saga Continues..., featuring Faith Evans and Mario Winans
- "Nothing's Gonna Stop Me Now", song by Ella Hunt from Anna and the Apocalypse

== See also ==
- "Nothing's Gonna Stop Us Now", song by Starship from No Protection and the 1987 film Mannequin
