= Alive Alone =

Studio album by Mickey Thomas
- Released: August 28, 1981
- Genre: Rock
- Labels: Elektra; Asylum
- Producers: Bill Szymczyk; Allan Blazek

Mickey Thomas chronology
As Long as You Love Me (1976)	Alive Alone (1981)	Over the Edge (2004)

Alive Alone is Mickey Thomas's 1981 album. After joining Jefferson Starship, Thomas was still under contract to record a second solo album. Alive Alone was released shortly after the Jefferson Starship album Modern Times, and Grace Slick's album Welcome to the Wrecking Ball!, but the Thomas album did not enter the Billboard chart.

== Cover songs ==
Thomas did not pen the tracks on the album, and a majority were initially performed by their writers, or other singers. "She's Got You Running", "Too Much Drama" (an Eagles outtake), and "I Don't Wanna Talk About It" (written by future Starship bassist Brett Bloomfield) are the only original songs.

"Alive Alone"

- First performed by songwriter Jules Shear's band the Polar Bears, appearing as a non-album B-Side in 1980.

"Maybe Tomorrow"

- Originally from the album Pity the Rich (1978) by rock band Pierce Arrow.

"Following Every Finger"

- Also performed first by Jules Shear and the Polar Bears, appearing on Got No Breeding 1978.

"This Time They Told the Truth"

- Debuted on singer Z.Z. Hill's 1978 album Let's Make a Deal.

"Survivor"

- Initially performed by Cidny Bullens in 1978.

"You're Good With Your Love"

- From composer Eddie Schwartz's 1981 album No Refuge under the title "Good With Your Love".

"Badge"

- Fourth track from Cream's final album, Goodbye (1969).

== Track listing ==
Side one
No.	Title	Writer(s)	Length
1.	"She's Got You Running"	Andy Goldmark, Jim Ryan	4:35
2.	"Alive Alone"	Jules Shear	3:19
3.	"Maybe Tomorrow"	Robbie Patton, Jonathan Cain	3:35
4.	"Following Every Finger"	Shear	3:37
5.	"This Time They Told the Truth"	Frederick Knight	4:44

Side two
No.	Title	Writer(s)	Length
6.	"Survivor"	Cidny Bullens	4:08
7.	"You're Good With Your Love"	Eddie Schwartz	3:48
8.	"I Don't Wanna Talk About It"	Brett Bloomfield	3:59
9.	"Too Much Drama"	Don Henley, Glenn Frey	3:33
10.	"Badge"	Eric Clapton, George Harrison	4:16

== Personnel ==
- Mickey Thomas – vocals; tambourine (track 1)
- Joe Vitale – drums (2–10), ARP synthesizer (tracks 1–3), synthesizer (track 7), marimba & percussion (track 4), tambourine (track 2), backing vocals (track 9)
- George "Chocolate" Perry – bass; backing vocals (track 9)
- Paul Harris – piano (tracks 1–3, 5–10), organ (track 4), electric piano (track 6), clavinet & synthesizer (track 8)
- Don Felder – guitar (tracks 1–5, 7–10)
- Steve Porcaro – synthesizer (tracks 1, 3)
- Craig Chaquico – guitar (track 6)
- Cory Lerios – synthesizer (track 10)
- Norton Buffalo – harmonica (track 7)
- Marty Grebb – saxophone (track 5)
- Neal Bonsanti – alto saxophone (track 10)
- Dan Bonsanti – tenor saxophone (track 10)
- Roger Homefield – trombone (track 10)
- Ken Faulk – trumpet (track 10)
- Donny Baldwin – backing vocals (tracks 1, 3, 4, 6, 9), drum programming (track 1)
- Julia Waters Tillman – backing vocals (tracks 5, 7)
- Maxine Waters Willard – backing vocals (tracks 5, 7)
- Oren Waters – backing vocals (tracks 5, 7)
- Chuck Thomas – backing vocals (track 8)
- Sara Thomas – backing vocals (track 8)
- The Miami Strings (tracks 4, 5)

=== Production ===
- Produced by Bill Szymczyk and Allan Blazek for Pandora Productions, Ltd.
- Engineered by Allan Blazek
- Mixed by Bruno Manzioni except "I Don't Wanna Talk About It" mixed by Blazek
- Mastered by Ted Jensen
