= Winds of Change (Jefferson Starship album) =

Studio album by Jefferson Starship
- Released: October 4, 1982
- Recorded: 1982 at the Automatt, San Francisco
- Genre: Rock, AOR
- Length: 40:16
- Label: Grunt
- Producer: Kevin Beamish

Jefferson Starship chronology
| Modern Times (1981) | Winds of Change (1982) | Nuclear Furniture (1984) |

Winds of Change is the seventh album by Jefferson Starship and was released in 1982. It was the first studio album produced after Grace Slick rejoined the band as a full member. Aynsley Dunbar plays drums on the album, but was replaced by Donny Baldwin for the supporting tour. The album reached number 26 on the Billboard charts.

The LP produced two U.S. Top 40 singles: "Be My Lady" in the fall of 1982 (#28), and "Winds of Change" in the winter of 1983 (#38).

== Reception ==
Cash Box called the title track "concisely crafted" and called the song a return to Jefferson Airplane's style. Joseph McCombs of AllMusic called the album "one of the weakest entries" in the band's discography and "strikingly unadventurous". Writing for Rolling Stone, Stephen Holden said that the songs sounded like bland, recycled versions of Jefferson Starship's other songs but that "there's still enough of a glimmer from the spark of Red Octopus to keep this ship rattling along".

== Track listing ==
Side A
| No. | Title | Lyrics | Music | Length |
|---|---|---|---|---|
| 1. | "Winds of Change" | Jeannette Sears | Pete Sears | 3:52 |
| 2. | "Keep on Dreamin'" | Craig Chaquico | Chaquico | 5:00 |
| 3. | "Be My Lady" | J. Sears | P. Sears | 3:50 |
| 4. | "I Will Stay" | J. Sears | P. Sears | 3:56 |
| 5. | "Out of Control" | Paul Kantner, China Wing Kantner, Grace Slick | Kantner | 2:53 |

Side B
| No. | Title | Lyrics | Music | Length |
|---|---|---|---|---|
| 1. | "Can't Find Love" | Grace Slick, Monica Clemans, Mickey Thomas, Chaquico | Chaquico | 4:48 |
| 2. | "Black Widow" | Chaquico, Grace Slick | Chaquico | 4:59 |
| 3. | "I Came Back From the Jaws of the Dragon" | Kantner | Kantner | 5:57 |
| 4. | "Quit Wasting Time" | J. Sears | P. Sears | 5:01 |

== Personnel ==
- Mickey Thomas – lead (1–4, 6, 9) and backing vocals
- Grace Slick – lead (1, 5, 7, 9) and backing vocals
- Paul Kantner – lead (8) and backing vocals, rhythm guitar
- Craig Chaquico – lead guitar, rhythm guitar
- David Freiberg – vocals, bass (3), keyboards (1, 2, 5, 6, 8), organ on (9), synthesizer (9)
- Pete Sears – bass (1, 2, 4–9), keyboards (3, 4), synthesizer (7, 9), piano (3, 8)
- Aynsley Dunbar – drums, percussion

=== Production ===
- Kevin Beamish – producer for Kevin Beamish Productions, Inc., engineer
- Maureen Droney – assistant engineer
- Tom Cummings – assistant mixing engineer
- Jeff Sanders – mastering
- Pat Ieraci (Maurice) – production coordinator
- Andreas Nottebohm – cover art, painting
- Dyer / Kahn, Inc. – design
- Paul Tokarski, Visual Promotions, Inc. – special effects photography
- Recorded at The Automatt, San Francisco
- Mixed and mastered at Kendun Recorders, Burbank
- Bill Thompson – manager

== Singles and music videos ==
- "Be My Lady" (1982) #28 US
- "Winds of Change" (1983) #38 US Billboard Hot 100; #37 Cash Box Top 100
- "Can't Find Love" (1983)
- "Out of Control" (music video only / no single released)

== Charts ==
| Chart (1982) | Peak position |
|---|---|
| US Billboard 200 | 26 |

== Certifications ==
| Region | Certification | Certified units/sales |
|---|---|---|
| United States (RIAA) | Gold | 500,000^{^} |
^{^} Shipments figures based on certification alone.
