= Knee Deep in the Hoopla =

Studio album by Starship
- Released: September 10, 1985
- Recorded: 1984−1985
- Studios: Record Plant (Sausalito, California); Music Grinder (Los Angeles)
- Genres: AOR; pop rock; synthpop
- Length: 40:10
- Labels: Grunt; RCA
- Producers: Peter Wolf; Jeremy Smith; Dennis Lambert (exec.)

Starship chronology
Knee Deep in the Hoopla (1985)	No Protection (1987)

Singles from Knee Deep in the Hoopla
- 1. "We Built This City" Released: August 26, 1985; 2. "Sara" Released: December 1985; 3. "Tomorrow Doesn't Matter Tonight" Released: April 1986; 4. "Before I Go" Released: June 1986

Knee Deep in the Hoopla is the debut studio album by American rock band Starship. It was released on September 10, 1985, through Grunt Records and RCA Records.

The album spawned four singles which all charted in the Billboard Hot 100 chart: the No. 1 hits "We Built This City" and "Sara", "Tomorrow Doesn't Matter Tonight" (No. 26) and "Before I Go" (No. 68).

== Background ==
In May 1984, Jefferson Starship released Nuclear Furniture. Paul Kantner, one of the band's founding members, left shortly after, criticizing the group's tilt toward commercial rock. In October, he sought to dissolve the band and sued his former bandmates over the ownership of its name. The lawsuit was settled in March 1985 with the agreement that the "Jefferson Starship" name would be retired by the group in favor of "Starship", a name now owned by singer Grace Slick and manager Bill Thompson.

Shortly after the new group's creation, David Freiberg (another Jefferson Starship founding member) departed as well. For the band's debut album, the lineup was reduced to a quintet consisting of singer Grace Slick, co-lead singer Mickey Thomas, guitarist Craig Chaquico, bassist Pete Sears, and drummer Donny Baldwin.

== Recording and production ==
Peter Wolf, who had worked on Nuclear Furniture, was hired to produce Knee Deep in the Hoopla. As the band sought a new, radio relevant sound, Wolf brought novel recording techniques. Among these was the use of the Synclavier, which guitarist Craig Chaquico later described as "cutting edge," adding that despite the changes, the group did not feel like they were "selling out," but rather felt like "they were trying to land a man on the moon." However, short-term member David Freiberg recalled in a 1997 interview that one of the reasons for his departure was that in the studio "nobody in the band was playing anything" as it was all about "producing" and "hot stuff keyboard players."

For the album, Wolf also sourced material from a wide variety of outside songwriters, which was said to have made the group more "unified and focused". This was an important change from the old lineup's previous albums, as the songs were primarily written by its members. "We Built This City" was the first product from these new recording efforts and the album's lead single. Originally written by Bernie Taupin (lyricist known for his work with Elton John) and Martin Page, the track was further developed by Wolf and co-producers Dennis Lambert and Jeremy Smith. The album's title was taken from one of the song's lyrics: "Knee deep in the hoopla, sinking in your fight". The second single, "Sara", was a ballad written by Wolf and his wife, Ina Wolf, and named after Mickey Thomas' then-wife. Both of these songs reached No. 1 on the Billboard Hot 100 chart.

The track "Desperate Heart", written by Michael Bolton and Randy Goodrum, also appeared on Bolton's album Everybody's Crazy, released earlier that year in March. "Rock Myself to Sleep" was written by Katrina and the Waves members Kimberley Rew and Vince de la Cruz and featured additional vocals by Quiet Riot's Kevin DuBrow. The song was originally performed by April Wine on their album Walking Through Fire (also 1985) and Katrina and the Waves later recorded their own version on their 1989 album Break of Hearts. The album's closing track, "Love Rusts", also written by Page and Taupin, featured additional background vocals by artists like Peter Beckett (from Player), Simon Climie (later of Climie Fisher fame), and Siedah Garrett. The only song on the record written by any of the band's members was "Private Room", penned by vocalist Mickey Thomas and guitarist Craig Chaquico. The music video for the album's third single, "Tomorrow Doesn't Matter Tonight" was directed by Francis Delia (director of the videos for "Sara" and "We Built This City") and shot in a converted warehouse located in downtown Los Angeles. The set was designed by Waldemar Kalinoswky.

Two songs sung by Grace Slick were recorded for but left off the album: Slick's own "Do You Remember Me?" (released on The Best of Grace Slick) and the Peter Wolf–Jeremy Smith composition "Casualty" (included as a bonus track on the remastered 1999 CD edition of the album). Pete Sears and his wife, Jeannette, wrote a song for the album titled "One More Innocent", which was rejected due to its political lyrics.

In November 1985, Billboard reported that Slick characterized the sound on the album as "cleaner, more crisp", while Thomas called it "more current, and more focused." In September, the publication also wrote that the album had been "tentatively titled 'Another American Dream Goes Berserk'."

Reflecting on the creation of Knee Deep in the Hoopla, vocalist Mickey Thomas would later say that:

"[with the album] we definitely made a conscious effort to sort of redefine ourselves and say: 'Let’s go in and try to do a completely different approach to music. Let’s use a different method. Let’s try to have a couple of hit singles. Let’s just go for it'."

== Release ==
Knee Deep in the Hoopla was released on September 10, 1985, through RCA and Grunt. Four singles were released from the album, which all charted on the US Billboard Hot 100 chart: the No. 1 hits "We Built This City" and "Sara", the No. 26 hit "Tomorrow Doesn't Matter Tonight" (peaked at No. 26), and the No. 68 "Before I Go". Knee Deep in the Hoopla was certified platinum by the RIAA on 27 December 1985.

On 22 September 2023, Knee Deep in the Hoopla was reissued as part of the limited-edition "Rhino Reds" series, launched in celebration of Rhino's 45th anniversary. The album was pressed on translucent red vinyl at Third Man and mastered by Jeff Powell. This release also included "Casualty" as a bonus track and was accompanied by a bonus 7" single featuring "We Built This City" and "Private Room".

== Critical reception ==
Professional ratings
Review scores
Source	Rating
AllMusic	2/5 stars
Melodic	5/5 stars

Joseph McCombs of AllMusic retrospectively described Knee Deep in the Hoopla as the Jefferson Airplane/Jefferson Starship/Starship project's "most overtly commercial effort to date." He noted that the album's songs "are pleasant but lightweight" and that while they "are less than memorable, they are very tuneful and melodic." McCombs highlighted "Love Rusts" as the standout cut.

On 7 September 1985, Cashbox stated that "We Built This City" was a "must-add," describing it as an "ear-catching" and "bouncy" song that was "dance rock with sharp hooks" for Contemporary hits radio. On September 21, the magazine said that Knee Deep in the Hoopla was "rich in commercial potential and musical satisfaction," observing that it placed emphasis on "melodic, pop songwriting" and the "vocal interplay" of Slick and Thomas. On the same day, Billboard noted that with the album, the band took their "techno-rock swing" to a "more decisive stance," describing the makeover as a shift toward the "mainstream '80s."

In November 1985, Stephen Holden of The New York Times said that the album, as a ''compendium of strutting pop-rock cliches," represented everything Jefferson Airplane stood against: "conformity, conservatism and a slavish adherence to formula." That same month, People argued that "although the producers give Starship’s music some punch," it was like trying to "resuscitate a pork chop". They considered "We Built This City" a tease "with nice keyboards by Wolf", and described the rest of the album as "weary hackwork." Some days later, Associated Press writer Larry Kilman described "We Built this City" as a "short and snappy" song that, with a catchy chorus, was made for radio play. He found the album to be "uneven," noting that "listeners drawn to it by 'We Built the City' [sic] will enjoy 'Hearts of the World' but little else." Kilman also singled out "Love Rusts", calling it the second-best song on the record. In December, Tom Ford of The Blade referred to Knee Deep in the Hoopla as the "quagmire of the commercial music market", describing the songs on it as "flashy and toothless," and concluding that there was no vision from the people who "should have some."

In April 1986, Cashbox said that "Mickey Thomas' sensational lead vocal" kept "Tomorrow Doesn't Matter Tonight" "aloft with exhilerating [sic] sonic flight," adding that the track, backed by "searing rock guitars and a churning rhythm," sliced "like a double bladed sword." Billboard called it "exemplary American AOR of the '80s, interrupted only by an ethereal bridge."

== Track listing ==
Side one
No.	Title	Writer(s)	Length
1.	"We Built This City"	Bernie Taupin; Martin Page; Dennis Lambert; Peter Wolf	4:53
2.	"Sara"	Ina Wolf; Peter Wolf	4:48
3.	"Tomorrow Doesn't Matter Tonight"	Steven Cristol; Robin Randall	3:41
4.	"Rock Myself to Sleep"	Kimberley Rew; Vince de la Cruz	3:24
5.	"Desperate Heart"	Randy Goodrum; Michael Bolton	4:04

Side two
No.	Title	Writer(s)	Length
1.	"Private Room"	Craig Chaquico; Mickey Thomas	4:51
2.	"Before I Go"	David Roberts	5:11
3.	"Hearts of the World (Will Understand)"	Stephen Broughton Lunt; Arthur Stead	4:21
4.	"Love Rusts"	Bernie Taupin; Martin Page	4:57
Total length:			40:10

Remastered CD bonus track
No.	Title	Writer(s)	Length
1.	"Casualty"	Peter Wolf; Jeremy Smith	4:34

== Personnel ==
Adapted from the album's liner notes.

Starship

- Mickey Thomas – co-lead vocals (1, 9), lead vocals (2, 3, 5–7), backing vocals
- Grace Slick – co-lead vocals (1, 9), lead vocals (4, 8), backing vocals
- Craig Chaquico – guitars
- Pete Sears – bass guitar, synth bass
- Donny Baldwin – drums, electronic drums, backing vocals

Additional personnel

- Peter Wolf – keyboards, electronics
- Kevin DuBrow – additional vocals (4)
- Dave Jenkins – additional background vocals (5)
- Peter Beckett; J. C. Crowley; Siedah Garrett; Ina Wolf – additional background vocals (3)
- Les Garland – DJ voice (1)

"Love Rusts" additional background vocals

- Peter Beckett
- Simon Climie
- J. C. Crowley
- Lorraine Devon
- Siedah Garrett
- Phillip Ingram
- Martin Page
- Chris Sutton
- Oren Waters
- Ina Wolf

Production

- Peter Wolf – producer, arranger
- Jeremy Smith – producer, engineer
- Stephen Marcussen – mastering (at Precision Laquer, Los Angeles)
- Bill Bottrell – mixing (1)
- Dennis Lambert – executive producer
- Skip Johnson – production coordinator
- Bill Thompson – manager
- Ted Raess (Raess Design) – art, design
- Bill Robins – photography

Assistant engineers

- Paul Ericksen
- Dana Chappelle
- David Luke
- Maureen Droney
- Tom Size – additional engineering

== Charts ==
=== Weekly charts ===
Chart (1985–1986)	Peak position
Australian Albums (Kent Music Report)	34
Canada Top Albums/CDs (RPM)	16
Dutch Albums (Album Top 100)	65
German Albums (Offizielle Top 100)	45
New Zealand Albums (RMNZ)	43
Swedish Albums (Sverigetopplistan)	22
Swiss Albums (Schweizer Hitparade)	29
US Billboard 200	7

=== Year-end charts ===
Chart (1986)	Position
Canada Top Albums/CDs (RPM)	78
US Billboard 200	13

== Certifications ==
Region	Certification	Certified units/sales
Canada (Music Canada)	Platinum	100,000^{^}
United States (RIAA)	Platinum	1,000,000^{^}
^{^} Shipments figures based on certification alone.
