= Jane (Jefferson Starship song) =

1979 single by Jefferson Starship

Single by Jefferson Starship

from the album Freedom at Point Zero
- B-side: "Freedom at Point Zero"
- Released: October 1979
- Genre: Hard rock
- Length: 4:00
- Label: Grunt
- Songwriters: David Freiberg, Jim McPherson, Craig Chaquico, Paul Kantner
- Producer: Ron Nevison

Jefferson Starship singles chronology
"Light the Sky on Fire" (1978)	"Jane" (1979)	"Girl With the Hungry Eyes" (1980)

Audio
- "Jane" on YouTube

"Jane" is a song by American rock band Jefferson Starship, released on their 1979 album Freedom at Point Zero. The song peaked on the US Billboard Hot 100 at No. 14 and spent three weeks at No. 6 on the Cash Box Top 100. Billboard Magazine described "Jane" as "a fiery track paced by stinging guitars and some burning rhythm work." Cash Box described it as "an explosive rocker, with slashing guitars." Record World called it a "driving rocker" and praised Mickey Thomas' vocals. GQ in 2015 said it was a "perfect, complex, trash-gem work of art."

== Chart history ==
=== Weekly charts ===
Chart (1979–80)	Peak position
Australia (Kent Music Report)	72
Canada Top Singles (RPM)	13
Spain (AFE)	29
New Zealand (Recorded Music NZ)	18
UK Singles (Official Charts)	21
US Billboard Hot 100	14
US Cash Box Top 100	6

=== Year-end charts ===
Chart	Year	Rank
Canada	1979	172
Canada	1980	86

== In popular culture ==
- The song was used as the opening music to the 2001 film Wet Hot American Summer and in the opening sequences of the Netflix prequel series Wet Hot American Summer: First Day of Camp.
- The song is used in the opening sequence of 2023 film Cocaine Bear (a reference to Wet Hot American Summer, in which Cocaine Bear's director, Elizabeth Banks, starred).
- "Jane" has been used as the official entrance song of professional wrestler Orange Cassidy from 2022 to 2024, and again in 2025. (This usage is also a reference to Wet Hot American Summer, as Cassidy's wrestling persona is partially based upon 'Andy', a character portrayed in the film by Paul Rudd.)
- “Jane” appeared in the 2009 video game Grand Theft Auto IV: The Lost and Damned on the in-game radio station Liberty Rock Radio.
