= Pete Sears =

English rock musician (born 1948)

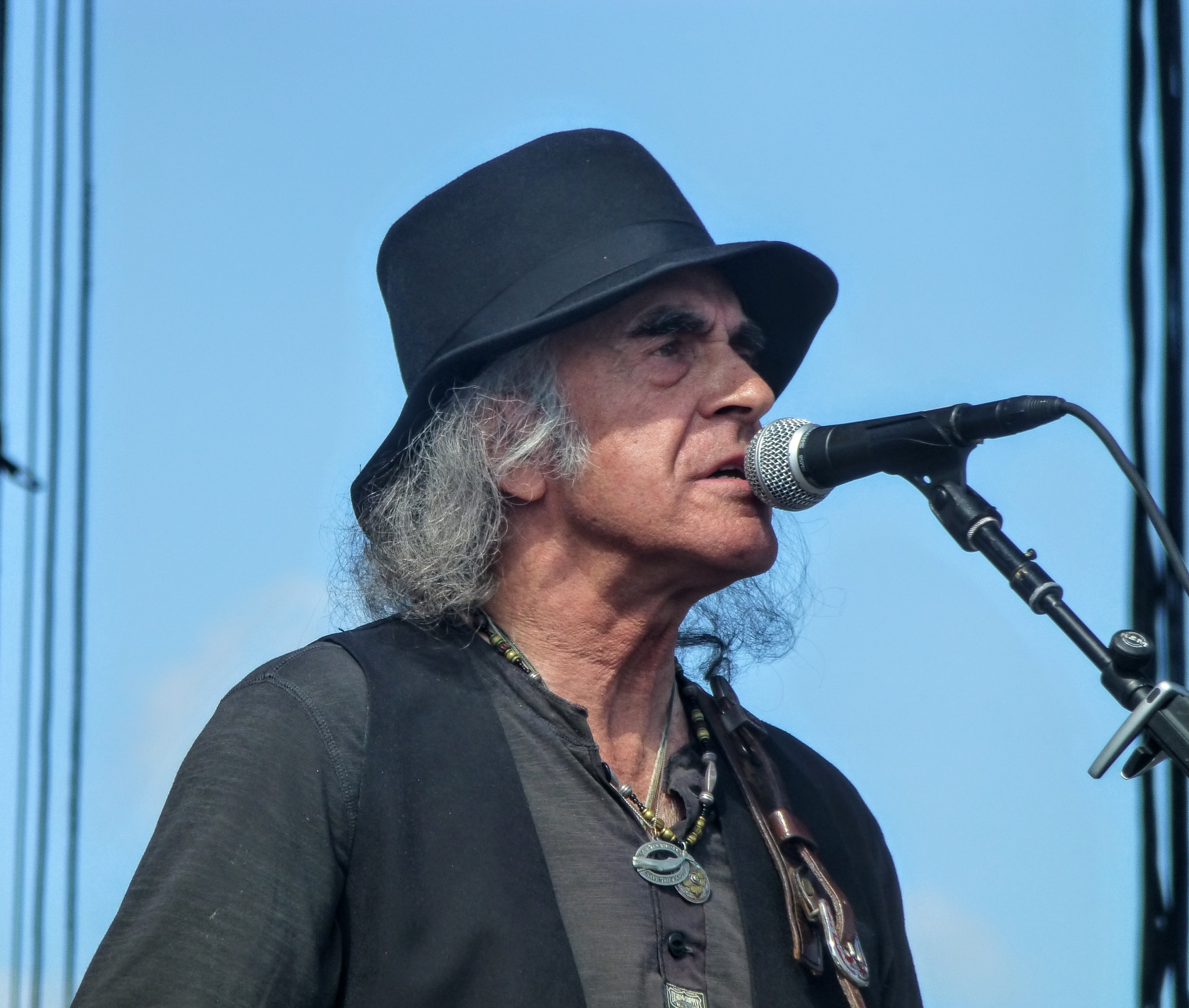
- Sears in 2015

Background information
- Born: Peter Roy Sears; 27 May 1948 (age 78)
- Origin: Bromley, Kent, England
- Genres: Psychedelic rock; folk rock; blues; arena rock
- Instruments: Bass guitar; keyboards; piano; guitar; ukulele; vocals
- Years active: 1960s–present
- Member of: Moonalice; Steamhammer
- Formerly of: Sons of Fred; Stoneground; Rod Stewart; Copperhead; Jefferson Starship; Starship; Hot Tuna; Zero
- Website: petesears.com

Peter Roy Sears (born 27 May 1948) is an English rock musician. In a career spanning more than six decades, he has been a member of many bands and has moved through a variety of musical genres, from early R&B, psychedelic improvisational rock of the 1960s, folk, country music, arena rock in the 1970s, and blues. He usually plays bass, keyboards, or both in bands.

== Overview ==
Pete Sears played on the Rod Stewart albums Gasoline Alley, Every Picture Tells A Story (which was listed high in Rolling Stone's top 500 best albums of all time), Never a Dull Moment, and Smiler. He also played on the hit singles "Maggie May", and "Reason to Believe". During this period, Sears toured the US with the Long John Baldry blues band, and played with John Cipollina in Copperhead.

Sears joined Jefferson Starship in 1974 and remained with the group through the transition to Starship, before departing in 1987. After leaving Starship he worked with bluesman Nick Gravenites, and many other artists including Jerry Garcia, Mickey Hart, Bob Weir, Maria Muldaur, Rich Kirch, Taj Mahal, and Mimi Farina. From 1992 to 2001, he played keyboards in the Jorma Kaukonen Trio with Kaukonen and Michael Falzarano, and with Kaukonen, Falzarano, and Jack Casady and Harvey Sorgen in Hot Tuna.

Sears has played with many other musicians through the years, including Dr. John, John Lee Hooker, Leigh Stephens and Micky Waller in Silver Metre; Long John Baldry, Copperhead with John Cipollina, Jerry Garcia, Chris Robinson Brotherhood, Levon Helm, Steve Kimock, David Hidalgo, Sons of Fred, The Fleur de Lys, Sam Gopal Dream, Jimi Hendrix, Pete Brown, Bob Weir, Los Cenzontles, Phil Lesh, Leftover Salmon, and Los Lobos. Currently, he divides his time between the David Nelson Band, Chris Robinson and Green Leaf Rustlers, Zero, California Kind, Harvey Mandel, Moonalice, and Steamhammer.

Sears has also written and recorded the original score for many documentary films, including the award-winning "The Fight in the Fields" – Cesar Chávez and the Farmworkers Struggle directed by Ray Telles and Rick Tehada Flores. His most recent film, also directed by Ray Telles and co-produced by Ken Rabin, is called The Storm That Swept Mexico (2011) about the Mexican Revolution.

== Career ==
Sears was born in Bromley, Kent. His career as a professional musician began in 1964, touring the United Kingdom with the band Sons of Fred. As well as playing British television shows such as Ready Steady Go and Thank Your Lucky Stars, Sons of Fred also recorded at EMI's Abbey Road Studios in London.

Pete Sears went on to play and record with many musical artists, including The Fleur De Lys in 1966, and the psychedelic underground band Sam Gopal Dream which featured guitarist Mick Hutchinson, Sears on bass and Hammond organ, and the Indian tabla player Sam Gopal. Jimi Hendrix once sat in with the band at the Speakeasy Club in London. Jimi Hendrix drummer Mitch Mitchell later asked Sears to play bass in a band he was forming while still playing with Hendrix in 1969.

Sears was a session musician during the late 1960s, including recording piano with the blues band Steamhammer. Steamhammer would back up the legendary Freddie King when he toured the UK. In early 1969, Sears along with Terry Cox of Pentangle, Jeff Beck's drummer Micky Waller, James Litherland of Colosseum, John Wetton of King Crimson, and Pete York of the Spencer Davis Group, recorded a folk rock album with Marian Segal and Jade. The album, Fly on Strange Wings is considered one of the seminal British folk rock albums of the 1960s and is highly valued by collectors. Around this time Sears teamed up with original Fairport Convention singer, Judy Dyble, and Van Morrison's Them organist, Jackie McAuley, to form the band Trader Horne.

In the summer of 1969, Sears left Trader Horne just before they began recording. Blue Cheer guitarist Leigh Stephens invited him to California for the first time. Sears, Stephens, Micky Waller (drummer), and Jack Reynolds (singer) formed Silver Metre, recorded one album at Trident Studios in London, England, released on the National General label, produced by their manager, FM rock radio pioneer Tom Donahue. The band toured the United States extensively in 1970. After Silver Metre broke up, Sears returned to England to play on the Rod Stewart album Gasoline Alley.

Stoneground manager Tom Donahue recruited Sears in London, during their Medicine Ball Caravan (1970) European tour later returning to the Marin County with them to record their first album in Hollywood, also produced by Tom Donahue.

From 1970 through 1974, Sears returned to session work, including playing on Stewart's early British solo albums: Gasoline Alley, Every Picture Tells a Story including the hit singles "Maggie May" and "Reason To Believe", Never a Dull Moment, and Smiler. In addition to playing for Stewart, he composed the brief instrumental "Lochinvar" on the Smiler album.

He also played bass with the Long John Baldry Blues Band on their first tour of the United States and played bass and keyboards with John Cipollina in the band Copperhead.

Sears left Copperhead just before recording their first album to work on Rod Stewart's Never a Dull Moment album in London, but mainly to join a new band Nicky Hopkins was putting together. Hopkins, who was on tour with the Rolling Stones had rented Sears a house in Mill Valley, California until he finished with the Stones tour. However, Hopkins was ultimately unable to form the band due to ill health and a dislike of the road. Sears went on to co-produce, arrange the music and play on, Kathi McDonald's Insane Asylum album, using guest artists like Sly Stone, The Pointer Sisters, Nils Lofgren, Neal Schon, Aynsley Dunbar, and the Tower of Power horns. He also co-founded a band called Sears, Schon, Errico with Neal Schon and Greg Errico, playing the Diamond Head Crater Festival in Hawaii, as well as several California shows.

Sears spent two weeks recording with Ike Turner at Ike's studio, Bolic Sound in Los Angeles. Tina Turner was there one night and recorded vocals on some of the tracks they had recorded, including a version of George Harrison's song "Something" on which Turner changed the "she" to "he".

=== With Jefferson Starship and Hot Tuna ===
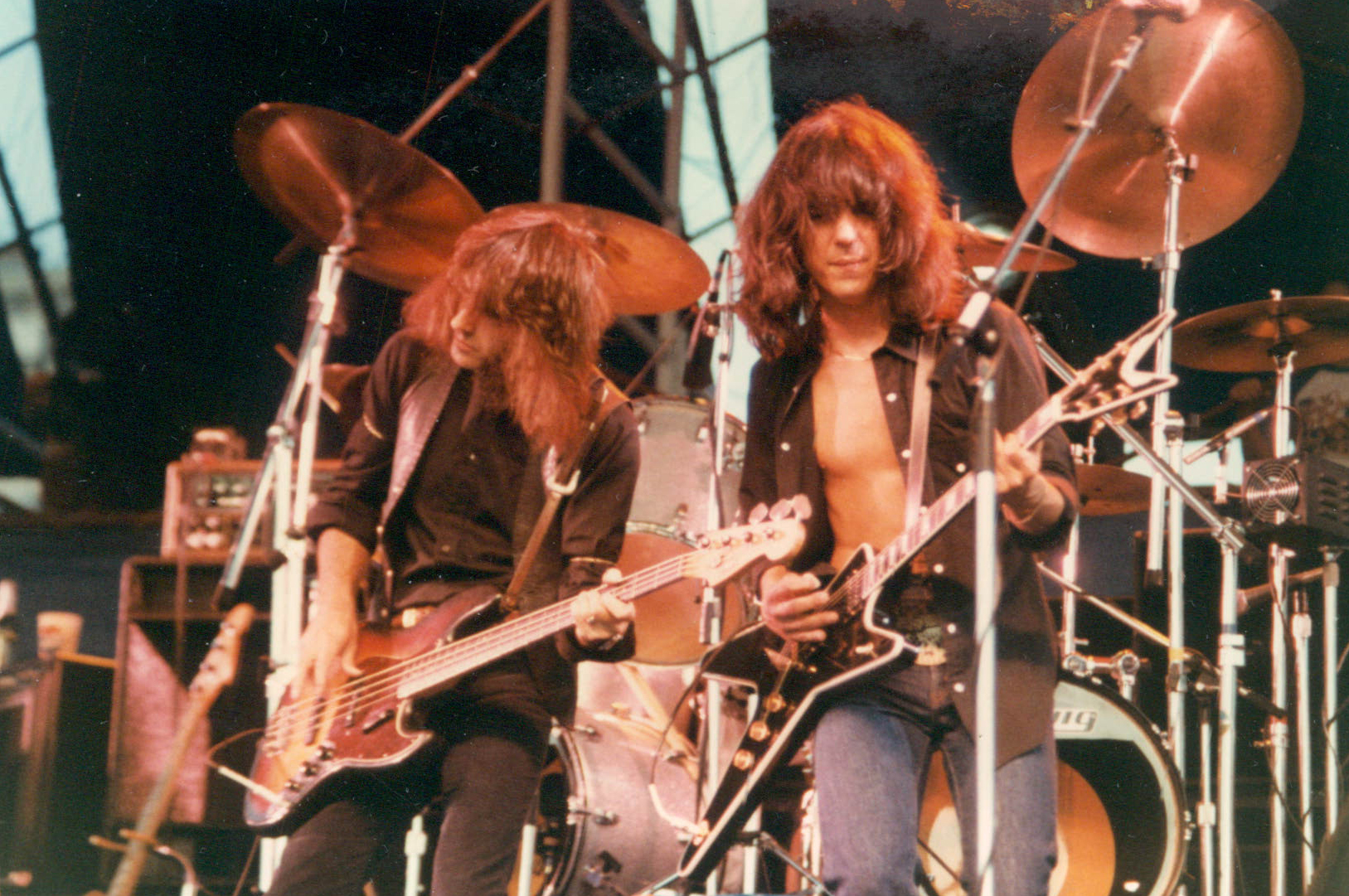
Sears (left) and Craig Chaquico of Jefferson Starship in 1980

In 1974, Sears joined Jefferson Starship, replacing Peter Kaukonen and switching back and forth between bass and keyboards with fellow multi-instrumentalist David Freiberg. He also wrote two or three songs per album with Grace Slick. Sears's first brush with Grunt Records was when Airplane drummer Joey Covington brought him to the studio to play bass on Papa John Creach’s first solo album. Grace Slick sang vocals in the same track Pete played on, “The Janitor Drives a Cadillac”. Singer Grace Slick left the band after her non-appearance caused a riot in Germany in 1978; within months drummer John Barbata was severely injured in a car crash and the band's other singer, Marty Balin, also left. The band hired vocalist Mickey Thomas and drummer Aynsley Dunbar. The band's musical direction changed, adopting a hard rock edge after Kantner hired rock producer Ron Nevison. Slick left the band for one album, Freedom at Point Zero, and Sears' wife Jeannette Sears became one of the principal lyricists alongside Kantner and Chaquico. Pete and Jeannette wrote songs such as "Stranger", "Save Your Love", and "Winds of Change". Grace had rejoined by this time, and Sears remained with the band after the departure of leader Paul Kantner and the subsequent name change to "Starship", but he became increasingly at odds with the commercial direction the band was taking. Pete and Jeannette were working heavily on Central American human rights issues at this time, and wrote several songs on the subject that were considered by the band to be too political in nature for a mostly upbeat pop record. He played only bass on the double-platinum 1985 album Knee Deep in the Hoopla and finally left the group in 1987 shortly after appearing in the music video to "Nothing's Gonna Stop Us Now".

In the early 1990s, Sears played keyboards with San Francisco-based psychedelic, jazz, rock band ZERO featuring guitarist Steve Kimock. Pete sat in on keys with ZERO in 2013, and now plays bass with them touring the east and west coasts of America.

From 1992 to 2001, Sears played keyboards with Jefferson Airplane's Jorma Kaukonen and Jack Casady in Hot Tuna. The band also included Michael Falzarano and Harvey Sorgen. They would sometimes tour as "The Jorma Kaukonen Trio" with Sears playing piano, accordion and keyboards. Sears sometimes teaches piano or bass at Jorma Kaukonen's Fur Peace Ranch guitar camp in southeastern Ohio. In 2011, Hot Tuna flew Sears out to New York City to perform at Jorma Kaukonen's 70th birthday bash at the Beacon Theatre. As well as his Hot Tuna bandmates, Sears played that night with Bob Weir, Steve Earle, and Oteil Burbridge.

=== Other collaborations ===
Through the years, he has recorded or performed with many other people, including Jerry Garcia, David Nelson, Warren Haynes, Leigh Stephens, Nick Gravenites, Peter Rowan, Steve Cropper, Roy Harper, Nicky Hopkins, Steve Kimock, Zydeco Flames, Ron Wood, Leftover Salmon, Eric McFadden, Betty Davis, Bob Weir, Mickey Hart, and Phil Lesh.

He has also worked live and in the studio and performed with John Lee Hooker, who wrote and recorded a song with Sears, called "Elizabeth". He has shared the stage with artists like Jimi Hendrix, The Allman Brothers, Los Lobos, Alvin Youngblood Hart, Sam Bush, Elvis Costello, Paul Butterfield, Michael Bloomfield, Levon Helm, the Grateful Dead, David Crosby, and Carlos Santana among others.

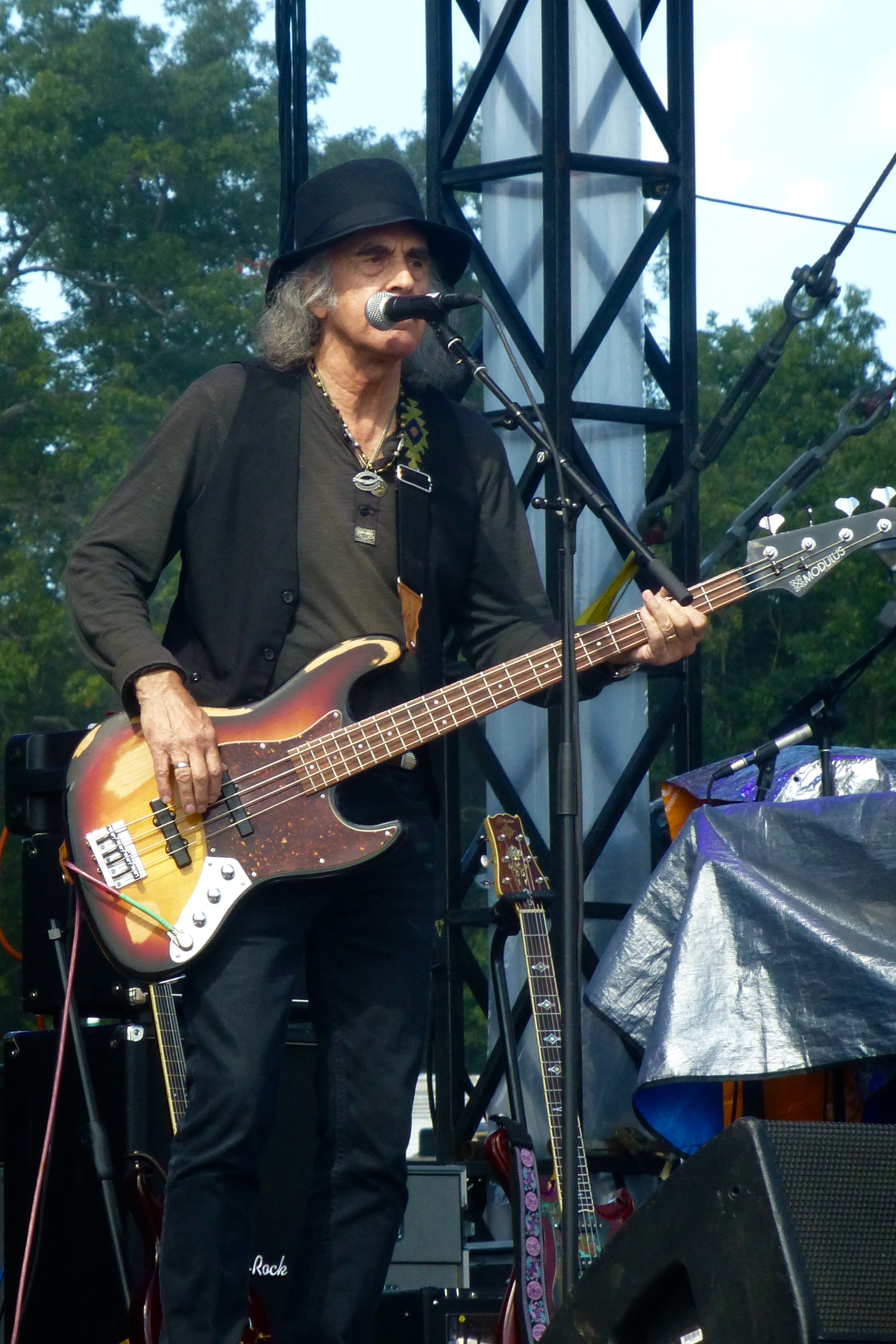
Sears performing with Moonalice at the 2015 Lockn' Festival

Sears' solo CDs include Watchfire with guests Jerry Garcia, Babatunde Olatunji, David Grisman, Mickey Hart, Mimi Farina, and Holly Near. Along with Jeannette, who wrote the majority of the album's lyrics, Sears became involved with human rights issues in Central America during the 1980s, and led a highly successful radio drive to raise food and clothing for refugees from the civil wars of Guatemala and El Salvador sheltering in the bay area. They formed a non-profit video production company called "Watchfire Productions", with Mark Adler, Mary McCue Obrian, and Emmy Award-winning documentary film director Ray Telles, producing a music video about human rights abuses on the Mayas of Guatemala. The project was funded by Jerry Garcia and the Rex Foundation, the Tides Foundation, and Earth Island Institute. Hundreds of copies of the video were distributed free of charge to human rights organisations around the world working to help stop the genocide in Central America. It was also aired extensively on the Canadian Much Music TV channel. During the mid-to-late 1980s, Sears and singer-songwriter, activist Mimi Farina, played at many benefits and protests in the San Francisco Bay Area in support of various Central American human rights, and environmental related causes. He once joined bluesman Nick Gravenites on the back of a flatbed truck, to drive down Market Street in San Francisco, playing the blues in support of nuclear disarmament, and protesting the US-backed injustices in Central America. They were joined by a hundred thousand other peace marchers.

In 1988, a group of citizens from the Soviet Union marched across the US as a show of support for peace and the end of the Cold War between the two countries. On 16 July 1988, a concert was held in the Band Shell in San Francisco's Golden Gate Park, organised by Ron Frazier and Bill McCarthy, who had hosted a previous event for the marchers in Los Angeles. Sears was asked to provide and organise the music for the event, so he invited his current band, ZERO, along with other musician friends including Jerry Garcia, whose band the Grateful Dead were performing later that night at the Greek Theater in Berkeley. Several Soviet rock bands, folk singers, and poets from the march also performed as well as two Tibetan drummers. Speeches were also held.

Sears was one of a very small group of Bay-area musicians invited to audition for the Grateful Dead's keyboard position in the summer of 1990 following the death of Brent Mydland; the chair was eventually given to Vince Welnick from The Tubes.

Sears performed at the Rock and Roll Hall of Fame tribute to John Lee Hooker at Stanford University as one of Hooker's guests. He also wrote a song with Hooker, "Elizabeth", which they performed live together in the studio on Sears' solo album The Long Haul. The track, "Elizabeth" was the last "live in the studio" band performance with no overdubs that John Lee Hooker was to record before his death in July 2001. "The Long Haul" includes guests Davey Pattison, Charlie Musselwhite, Levon Helm, Jorma Kaukonen, Jack Casady, Steve Kimock, Francis Clay, Nick Gravenites, Maria Muldaur, Wavy Gravy, Shana Morrison and Rich Kirch.

Pete Sears currently performs with David Nelson Band, Steve Kimock & Zero, Moonalice with Lester Chambers, Chris Robinson Brotherhood, Chris Robinson & Green Leaf Rustlers, Harvey Mandel, Louisiana Love Act, California Kind and Steamhammer.

== Jeannette Sears ==
Pete and his wife Jeannette met in 1971 and began their relationship as a songwriting team. They married in 1975 in Mill Valley, California.

They became active with numerous Central American relief organisations through the '80s, working on benefits and immediate relief to refugees. In the late 1980s they spearheaded a radio drive in the San Francisco Bay area to raise food and clothing for refugees fleeing the ravages of civil war in Guatemala and El Salvador. In 1988, the California Institute of Integral Studies gave them an award for humanitarian work in the Bay area. Her passion for social justice shows up in her first novel, A Light Rain of Grace.

== Discography ==
Pete Sears appears on the following albums:

Solo albums

- Watchfire (1988)
- Millennium (1997)
- The Long Haul (2001)

with Sons of Fred

- "Sweet Love" 1964
- "I'll Be There" 1964
- "I, I, I Want Your Lovin'" 1965
- "She Only Wants a Friend" 1965
- "Baby What You Want Me to Do" 1966
- "You Told Me" 1966

with Les Fleur de Lys

- "Circles" 1966

with Sam Gopal Dream 1967

- 1967 recordings for Screen Gems, previously unreleased

with Steamhammer

- Steamhammer (1969)

with Jade (UK band)

- "Fly on Strangewings" 1970

with Silver Metre

- "Silver Metre" 1970

with Stoneground

- Stoneground (1971)
- Family Album (1971)

with Rod Stewart

- Gasoline Alley (1970)
- Every Picture Tells a Story (1971)
- Never a Dull Moment (1972)
- Smiler (1974)

with Jefferson Starship

- Dragon Fly (1974)
- Red Octopus (1975)
- Spitfire (1976)
- Earth (1978)
- Freedom at Point Zero (1979)
- Modern Times (1981)
- Winds of Change (1982)
- Nuclear Furniture (1984)

with Starship

- Knee Deep in the Hoopla (1985)
- No Protection (1987), uncredited

with Hot Tuna

- Live at Sweetwater (1992)
- Live at Sweetwater Two (1993)
- Live in Japan (1997)
- And Furthurmore... (1999)

with Jorma Kaukonen

- Too Many Years (1998)
- Jorma Kaukonen Trio Live (2000)

Guest Appearances

- Papa John Creach (by Papa John Creach) (1971)
- Betty Davis (by Betty Davis) (1973)
- Manhole (by Grace Slick) (1973)
- Insane Asylum (by Kathi McDonald) (1974)
- Tiger Rose (by Robert Hunter) (1975)
- Solid Silver (by Quicksilver Messenger Service) (1975)
- Blue Star (by Nick Gravenites) (1980)
- The Doubtful Handshake (by Terry & the Pirates) (1980)
- The Usual Suspects (by The Usual Suspects) (1981)
- Rising of the Moon (by Terry & the Pirates) (1982)
- Planet Earth Rock and Roll Orchestra (by Paul Kantner) (1983)
- Chance in a Million (by Zero) (1994)
- Mecca (by Memphis Pilgrims) (1996)
- Kak (by Kak) (1999 re-release)
- Love Will See You Through (by Phil Lesh) (1999)
- Live at the Chi Chi Club (by Marc Benno) (2005)
- We Are All One (by Michael Falzarano) (2008)
- I Got Blues for Ya (by Michael Falzarano) (2014)
- A Kaleidoscope Christmas (by Michael Falzarano) (2020)
