= We Built This City =

1985 debut single by Starship

Single by Starship

from the album Knee Deep in the Hoopla
- B-side: "Private Room" (Instrumental)
- Released: August 26, 1985
- Recorded: 1984−1985
- Genre: Dance-rock; synth-rock
- Length: 4:53 (album version); 4:49 (single version)
- Label: Grunt, RCA
- Songwriters: Bernie Taupin; Martin Page; Dennis Lambert; Peter Wolf
- Producers: Peter Wolf; Jeremy Smith

Starship singles chronology
"We Built This City" (1985)	"Sara" (1985)

Audio sample
- "We Built This City": file; help

Music video
- "We Built This City" on YouTube

"We Built This City" is the debut single by American rock band Starship, from their 1985 debut album Knee Deep in the Hoopla. It was written by English songwriters Martin Page and Bernie Taupin, who were both living in Los Angeles at the time, and was originally intended as a lament against the closure of many of that city's live music clubs.

The song peaked at No. 1 on the Billboard Hot 100. Outside the United States, "We Built This City" topped the charts in Australia and Canada, peaked inside the Top 10 of the charts in Germany, the Republic of Ireland, Sweden and Switzerland, the Top 20 on the charts in Belgium, New Zealand and the United Kingdom and the Top 30 of the charts in Austria and the Netherlands.

Although Billboard and Cash Box magazines positively reviewed the song upon its release, significant criticism surfaced in later years, both for the inscrutability of its lyrics and the purported contrast between the song's anti-corporate message and its polished, "corporate rock" sound. It topped a 2011 Rolling Stone poll of worst songs of the 1980s by a wide margin, and the magazines Blender and GQ both called it the worst song of all time.

The album's title, Knee Deep in the Hoopla, is taken from a lyric in the first verse of this song.

== Content and production ==
Song co-writers Martin Page and Bernie Taupin have stated that the song is about the decline of live-performance clubs in Los Angeles during the 1980s. In 2013, Taupin told Rolling Stone that the "original song was a very dark kind of mid-tempo song ... about how club life in L.A. was being killed off and live acts had no place to go ... A guy called Peter Wolf [the album's producer] ... got ahold of the demo and totally changed it. He jerry-rigged it into the pop hit it was". In an interview with Songfacts, Page added that the "demo was quite high-energy techno, because that was the sound of the band I was in ... it was a little more edgy. And I'm very pleased with what Starship did with it, because they made it a universally appealing song".

Though "We Built This City" was originally written about Los Angeles, the Starship rendition references San Francisco (the hometown of both Starship and its predecessors, Jefferson Airplane and Jefferson Starship). MTV executive and former DJ Les Garland provided the DJ voiceover during the song's bridge. While "the city by the bay" refers to San Francisco, the other two phrases used by Garland—"the city that rocks" and "The City That Never Sleeps"—refer to Cleveland, Ohio, and New York City, respectively. To capitalize on this, several radio stations, with the help of jingle company JAM Creative Productions, customized the bridge when broadcasting the song by adding descriptions of their own local areas or inserting their idents.

The song was engineered by producer Bill Bottrell, written by Bernie Taupin, Martin Page, Dennis Lambert and Peter Wolf and arranged by Bottrell and Jasun Martz with shared lead vocals by Mickey Thomas and Grace Slick.

== Reception ==
=== Initial release ===
Initially, "We Built This City" had positive reviews. Billboard said in 1985 that this "unusual rock 'n' roll anthem is as wise as it is rebellious". Cash Box called it "an ear-catching tune" and described it as "dance rock with sharp hooks".

"We Built This City" received a Grammy Award nomination for Best Rock Vocal Performance by a Duo or Group in 1986.

=== Legacy ===
The song began to be seen less favorably in later decades. In 2004, the magazine Blender ran a feature on "The 50 Worst Songs Ever", in conjunction with the VH1 Special The 50 Most Awesomely Bad Songs...Ever. To qualify, songs had to be well-known hits; the list also avoided novelty songs, and multiple songs by the same artist. "We Built This City" came in at #1. According to Blender editor Craig Marks, the choice was nearly unanimous among those who had been polled. Marks said of the song, "It purports to be anti-commercial but reeks of '80s corporate-rock commercialism. It's a real reflection of what practically killed rock music in the '80s."

Richmond Times-Dispatch music critic Melissa Ruggieri found the placement of the song at the top of the Blender list "ridiculous...They chose the song that references Marconi, the father of the radio. The song that inserted a cool snippet of DJ chatter from the band's beloved San Francisco. The song that found Grace Slick enunciating the phrase 'corporation games' with nutty abandon. C'mon, Blender. Don't you realize that part of being cool is admitting to finding the value in catchy pop songs?" Les Garland, who provided the voice of the disc jockey in the song, called the whole Blender list "a joke" and said the placement of "We Built This City" was "like saying Coca-Cola is the worst drink ever." Asked about the listing, Starship singer Mickey Thomas said he was surprised at the ranking, but also "thrilled" because of the other high-profile groups on the list, saying, "I wish Blender had called us for a group shot. I'd love to have my picture taken with Stevie Wonder and Paul McCartney." (Wonder and McCartney were listed together at #10 for their 1982 duet "Ebony and Ivory".) Asked again about the listing in 2010, Thomas said: "From what I heard, they got so much flak about it that they sort of retracted their statements in a way about the song. And not only that, but Blender's folded, and we're still here."

In 2011, a Rolling Stone magazine online readers poll named "We Built This City" the worst song of the 1980s. The song's winning margin was so large that the magazine reported it "could be the biggest blow-out victory in the history of the Rolling Stone Readers Poll".

In August 2016, Gentleman's Quarterly magazine declared this song as the worst of all time, referring to it as "the most detested song in human history". The article covered Bernie Taupin and Martin Page's roles in writing an early version of the song, the song's development into its final version, its massive success and backlash, and Grace Slick's inconsistent statements about whether she liked the song.

== Personnel ==
- Mickey Thomas – lead and backing vocals
- Grace Slick – lead and backing vocals
- Craig Chaquico – lead and rhythm guitar
- Pete Sears – bass guitar
- Donny Baldwin – electronic drums, backing vocals

Additional personnel

- Peter Wolf – keyboards, synthesizers
- Les Garland – DJ voice

== Charts ==
=== Weekly charts ===
1985–1986 weekly chart performance for "We Built This City"
Chart (1985–1986)	Peak position
Australia (Kent Music Report)	1
Austria (Ö3 Austria Top 40)	21
Belgium (Ultratop 50 Flanders)	17
Canada Top Singles (RPM)	1
Europe (European Hot 100 Singles)	7
Ireland (IRMA)	9
Netherlands (Dutch Top 40)	24
Netherlands (Single Top 100)	21
New Zealand (Recorded Music NZ)	11
Paraguay	1
South Africa (Springbok Radio)	1
Sweden (Sverigetopplistan)	4
Switzerland (Schweizer Hitparade)	8
UK Singles (Official Charts)	12
US Billboard Hot 100	1
US Mainstream Rock Airplay (Billboard)	1
US Adult Contemporary (Billboard)	37
US Dance Club Songs (Billboard)	37
US Cash Box Top 100	1
West Germany (GfK)	10

2014 weekly chart performance for "We Built This City"
Chart (2014)	Peak position
UK Singles (Official Charts)	26

=== Year-end charts ===
1985 year-end chart performance for "We Built This City"
Chart (1985)	Position
Canada Top Singles (RPM)	25
US Billboard Hot 100	14
US Cash Box Top 100	26

1986 year-end chart performance for "We Built This City"
Chart (1986)	Position
Australia (Kent Music Report)	11
South Africa (Springbok Radio)	10

== Certifications ==
Certifications for "We Built This City"
Region	Certification	Certified units/sales
Canada (Music Canada)	Gold	50,000^{^}
Denmark (IFPI Danmark)	Gold	45,000^{‡}
Germany (BVMI)	Gold	300,000^{‡}
New Zealand (RMNZ)	4× Platinum	120,000^{‡}
United Kingdom (BPI)	2× Platinum	1,200,000^{‡}
United States (RIAA)	Gold	500,000^{^}
^{^} Shipments figures based on certification alone.^{‡} Sales+streaming figures based on certification alone.

== Covers and parodies ==
=== LadBaby version ===
"We Built This City"

Single by LadBaby
- Released: December 14, 2018
- Recorded: 2018
- Genre: Comedy rock
- Length: 4:20
- Label: Frtyfve
- Songwriters: Mark Hoyle; Bernie Taupin; Martin Page; Dennis Lambert; Peter Wolf

LadBaby singles chronology
"We Built This City" (2018)	"I Love Sausage Rolls" (2019)

Music video
- "We Built This City" on YouTube

In December 2018, British blogger LadBaby released a comedy version of the song with a sausage roll theme (the refrain being "We Built This City on Sausage Rolls") as a charity single whose profits went to The Trussell Trust. It debuted at number one on the UK Singles Chart, beating Ava Max's "Sweet but Psycho" and Ariana Grande's "Thank U, Next" to the 2018 Christmas number one.

Weekly chart performance for "We Built This City" by LadBaby
Chart (2018)	Peak position
Australia Digital Track Chart (ARIA)	31
Scottish Singles Sales (Official Charts)	1
UK Singles (Official Charts)	1
US Hot Rock Songs (Billboard)	47

=== Other versions ===
In 2005, Half Man Half Biscuit parodied the song on their Achtung Bono album, "We Built This Village on a Trad. Arr. Tune".

American indie rock band Cursive covered the song in 2010 for the first season of The A.V. Club's A.V. Undercover web series.

Portions of the song – with altered lyrics such as "we quilt this city with a comfy roll" – were used in 2024 advertisements for Quilted Northern toilet paper.

== See also ==
- List of music considered the worst
