= Nothing's Gonna Stop Us Now =

1987 single by Starship

Single by Starship

from the album No Protection
- B-side: "Layin' It on the Line"
- Released: January 19, 1987
- Recorded: September 1986
- Genre: Soft rock; synth-rock
- Length: 4:29
- Label: Grunt; RCA
- Songwriters: Diane Warren; Albert Hammond
- Producer: Narada Michael Walden

Starship singles chronology
"Before I Go" (1986)	"Nothing's Gonna Stop Us Now" (1987)	"It's Not Over Til It's Over" (1987)

Music video
- "Nothing's Gonna Stop Us Now" on YouTube

"Nothing's Gonna Stop Us Now" is a song co-written by Diane Warren and Albert Hammond and recorded by American rock band Starship for their second studio album, No Protection (1987). It is a power ballad duet featuring vocalists Grace Slick and Mickey Thomas and the theme to the 1987 romantic-comedy film Mannequin.

The song reached number one on the US Billboard Hot 100, Warren's first single to do so. Elsewhere, "Nothing's Gonna Stop Us Now" topped the charts in Canada, Ireland and the United Kingdom, where it became the second-best-selling song of 1987. "Nothing's Gonna Stop Us Now" received a nomination for Best Original Song at the 60th Academy Awards. A Cantonese cover, 敢愛敢做 by George Lam, briefly topped the Hong Kong charts.

The song's co-writer Albert Hammond has recorded his own version on three occasions: the first in 1989 for his Best of Me album, in 2010 as a duet with Bonnie Tyler on the album Legend, and then in 2014 as an orchestral version on the album In Symphony. The song was used as the trailer and end credits song for the Marvel Cinematic Universe film Thunderbolts* (2025).

== Background ==
In a radio interview, Hammond said that the idea for the song came from his impending marriage to his live-in girlfriend of seven years after his divorce from his previous wife was finalized. He had said to Warren, "It's almost like they've stopped me from marrying this woman for seven years, and they haven't succeeded. They're not gonna stop me doing it." The song has been considered "feel good" propelled by a strong synthesizer beat.

== Reception ==
Cash Box called the song "an emotional duet by Mickie [sic] Thomas and Grace Slick" and "a blustery, expansive production."

== Commercial performance ==
The song topped the Billboard Hot 100 on April 4, 1987. In the United Kingdom, the song peaked at the top of the UK Singles Chart for four weeks and became the UK's second-best-selling song of 1987 behind "Never Gonna Give You Up" by Rick Astley. The song also reached the top 10 in six other European countries. It became the first chart-topping song to be written by Warren. Grace Slick, at age 47, became the oldest woman to attain a number-one single in the United States, surpassed only by Cher, who was 52 when her song "Believe" reached number one in early 1999.

== Music video ==
The music video for "Nothing's Gonna Stop Us Now" was released in 1987. It features clips from the film Mannequin, starring Andrew McCarthy and Kim Cattrall, intercut with a parallel narrative of Mickey Thomas falling in love with a mannequin who comes to life, played by Grace Slick. Meshach Taylor makes a cameo reprising his film role of window dresser Hollywood Montrose, as does Narada Michael Walden, the producer of the song, who appears with the band. Towards the end of the video, viewers are shown that the band's members are also mannequins.

== Track listings ==
- 7-inch single

A. "Nothing's Gonna Stop Us Now" – 4:29
B. "Layin' It on the Line" (live at Stopher Gym, Nicholls State University) (Note: The liner notes incorrectly list Louisiana State University as the location of Stopher Gym.) – 4:15

- 12-inch single

A1. "Nothing's Gonna Stop Us Now" – 4:29
A2. "Layin' It on the Line" – 4:15
B1. "We Built This City" (special club mix) – 7:00
B2. "Tomorrow Doesn't Matter Tonight" – 3:41

== Personnel ==
- Mickey Thomas – vocals
- Grace Slick – vocals
- Donny Baldwin – drums, backing vocals
- Craig Chaquico – guitar (lead/solo only)
- Pete Sears – bass

=== Additional personnel ===
- Walter "Baby Love" Afanasieff – keyboards, synth bass
- Narada Michael Walden – LinnDrum programming
- Corrado Rustici – Charvel MIDI guitar
- Robert "Bongo Bob" Smith – drum sampling and percussion
- Karen "Kitty Beethoven" Brewington, Jim Gilstrap – background vocals

== Charts ==
=== Weekly charts ===
Weekly chart performance for "Nothing's Gonna Stop Us Now"
Chart (1987)	Peak position
Australia (Australian Music Report)	3
Austria (Ö3 Austria Top 40)	3
Belgium (Ultratop 50 Flanders)	5
Canada Retail Singles (The Record)	1
Canada Top Singles (RPM)	1
Canada Adult Contemporary (RPM)	1
Europe (European Hot 100 Singles)	4
Finland (Suomen virallinen lista)	7
France (SNEP)	16
Ireland (IRMA)	1
Italy Airplay (Music & Media)	1
Netherlands (Dutch Top 40)	5
Netherlands (Single Top 100)	8
New Zealand (Recorded Music NZ)	21
Norway (VG-lista)	2
Portugal (AFP)	1
South Africa (Springbok Radio)	3
Sweden (Sverigetopplistan)	2
Switzerland (Schweizer Hitparade)	4
UK Singles (Official Charts)	1
US Billboard Hot 100	1
US Adult Contemporary (Billboard)	1
US Mainstream Rock Airplay (Billboard)	16
US Cash Box Top 100	1
US CHR/Pop Airplay Chart (Radio & Records)	1
West Germany (GfK)	3

Chart (2026)	Peak position
Philippines (Philippines Hot 100)	99

=== Year-end charts ===
Year-end chart performance for "Nothing's Gonna Stop Us Now"
Chart (1987)	Position
Australia (Australian Music Report)	12
Austria (Ö3 Austria Top 40)	17
Belgium (Ultratop 50 Flanders)	26
Canada Top Singles (RPM)	5
Europe (European Hot 100 Singles)	8
Netherlands (Dutch Top 40)	9
Netherlands (Single Top 100)	31
Norway Spring Period (VG-lista)	2
South Africa (Springbok Radio)	5
Switzerland (Schweizer Hitparade)	8
UK Singles (Gallup)	2
US Billboard Hot 100	5
US Adult Contemporary (Billboard)	26
US Cash Box Top 100	8
West Germany (Media Control)	20

== Certifications ==
Certifications and sales for "Nothing's Gonna Stop Us Now"
Region	Certification	Certified units/sales
Canada (Music Canada)	Gold	50,000^{^}
Denmark (IFPI Danmark)	Platinum	90,000^{‡}
New Zealand (RMNZ)	3× Platinum	90,000^{‡}
Spain (Promusicae)	Platinum	60,000^{‡}
Sweden (GLF)	Gold	25,000^{^}
United Kingdom (BPI)	Platinum	957,336
United States (RIAA)	Gold	500,000^{^}
^{^} Shipments figures based on certification alone.^{‡} Sales+streaming figures based on certification alone.

== See also ==
- List of Billboard Hot 100 number ones of 1987
- List of Hot Adult Contemporary number ones of 1987
- List of number-one singles of 1987 (Canada)
- List of number-one singles of 1987 (Ireland)
- List of UK Singles Chart number ones of the 1980s
