= Freedom at Point Zero =

Studio album by Jefferson Starship
- Released: November 1979
- Recorded: 1979
- Studios: The Record Plant, Los Angeles and Sausalito
- Genres: Rock, hard rock, arena rock
- Length: 42:27
- Label: Grunt
- Producer: Ron Nevison

Jefferson Starship chronology
Gold (1979)	Freedom at Point Zero (1979)	Modern Times (1981)

Freedom at Point Zero is the fifth album by American rock band Jefferson Starship, released in 1979. It was the first album for new lead singer Mickey Thomas, and the first after both Grace Slick and Marty Balin left the previous year (Slick rejoined the band for their next album Modern Times in 1981 and Balin joined the revived Jefferson Starship in 1993). Aynsley Dunbar plays drums on this album; he had left Journey the previous year. The album cover was shot on location in the San Francisco Bay on board the USCGC Midgett.

The album spawned the hit single "Jane", which peaked on the Billboard Hot 100 at No. 14 and spent three weeks at No. 6 on the Cash Box Top 100. "Jane" was featured in the 2009 video game Grand Theft Auto IV: The Lost and Damned, as well as the opening music to the film Wet Hot American Summer and its prequel series Wet Hot American Summer: First Day of Camp, while also being featured in the 2023 comedy thriller film Cocaine Bear. It is one of the few songs that was performed live by both the Paul Kantner-led Jefferson Starship TNG and the Mickey Thomas-led Starship. The song "Lightning Rose" predicts the concept of the Nuclear Furniture album, and in fact its character Lightning Rose would return on Nuclear Furniture as the key character in that album's concept.

== Critical reception ==
Professional ratings
Review scores
Source	Rating
AllMusic	3/5 stars
Christgau's Record Guide	C−
The Rolling Stone Album Guide	2/5 stars

Record World called the single "Girl with the Hungry Eyes" a "ferocious rocker." It said of "Rock Music" that "Mickey Thomas' frenetic vocals rip over roaring guitars." The Globe and Mail wrote: "Starship has been making music for the eighties since about 1967. Now that the eighties are here, it's only logical that this band should remain at the forefront of the style it pioneered."

== Track listing ==
No.	Title	Lyrics	Music	Length
1.	"Jane"	David Freiberg, Jim McPherson	Freiberg, McPherson, Paul Kantner, Craig Chaquico	4:07
2.	"Lightning Rose (Carry the Fire)"	Kantner	Kantner	4:36
3.	"Things to Come"	Kantner, China Wing Kantner	Kantner	4:49
4.	"Awakening"	Jeannette Sears	Pete Sears	7:59
5.	"Girl with the Hungry Eyes"	Kantner	Kantner	3:28
6.	"Just the Same"	Chaquico, J. Sears	Chaquico, Eric Van Soest	5:17
7.	"Rock Music"	Chaquico, J. Sears	Chaquico	3:35
8.	"Fading Lady Light"	J. Sears	P. Sears, Mark Unobsky	3:39
9.	"Freedom at Point Zero (Climbing Tiger Mountain through the Sky)"	Kantner	Kantner	4:25

== Personnel ==
Jefferson Starship

- Mickey Thomas – lead (1, 3–9) and backing vocals
- Paul Kantner – lead (2, 9) and backing vocals, rhythm guitar, keyboards (3)
- Craig Chaquico – lead guitar, rhythm guitar
- David Freiberg – bass (1, 2, 4, 6, 8) synthesizer (1, 3, 5, 7, 9), backing vocals
- Pete Sears – bass (3, 4 (intro), 5, 7, 9), piano (1, 2, 4, 6), electric piano (6), organ (1, 6, 8), rhythm guitar (8), backing vocals
- Aynsley Dunbar – drums, percussion

Additional personnel

- Steven Schuster – saxophone (1–3, 6, 9)
- Tower of Power – horns (1)

Production

- Ron Nevison – producer for Gadget Productions, Inc., engineer
- Michael Clink – engineer
- Mike Reese – mastering
- Pat Ieraci (Maurice) – production coordinator
- Paul Dowell – amp consultant
- Ria Lewerke-Shapiro – art direction, design
- Gary Regester – photography
- Tyrone Q. Thompson – star scout
- Recorded and mixed at The Record Plant, Los Angeles - Sausalito
- Mastered at The Mastering Lab, Hollywood

== Charts ==
Chart (1979–80)	Peak position
Australian albums (Kent Music Report)	75
Canada Top Albums/CDs (RPM)	20
New Zealand Albums (RMNZ)	23
UK Albums (Official Charts)	22
US Billboard 200	10

== Certifications ==
Region	Certification	Certified units/sales
Canada (Music Canada)	Platinum	100,000^{^}
United States (RIAA)	Gold	500,000^{^}
^{^} Shipments figures based on certification alone.
