= Over the Edge (Mickey Thomas album) =

Studio album by Mickey Thomas
- Released: 2004
- Studio: The Noize Factory Studio (Canyon Country, California): The Art of Noize (Hollywood, California)
- Genre: Rock
- Producer: Fabrizio Grossi

Over the Edge is a 2004 album from American rock singer Mickey Thomas. Writers on the album include Jack Blades, Neal Schon, Jonathan Cain, Freddy Curci and Steven Cristol.

It is rated 3.5 out of 5 stars on AllMusic.

== Track listing ==
1. "Over The Edge" (Jack Blades, Fabrizio Grossi) - 4:50
2. "One World" (Blades, Neal Schon) - 5:31
3. "Thief" (David Stenmarck, Martin Stenmarck) - 3:40
4. "Surrender" (Blades, Schon) - 4:12
5. "Eyes Wide Open" (Jonathan Cain) - 5:48
6. "Forest For The Trees" (Dan Hall, Jason Singh, Tim Watson, Tim Wild) - 4:07
7. "The Man In Between" (Grossi, Lara Cody, Freddy Curci) - 4:45
8. "Cover Me" (Bebo Norman) - 5:15
9. "Turn Away" (Steven Cristol, David Young) - 3:53
10. "Glory Day" (Blades, Grossi) - 5:03

== Personnel ==
- Mickey Thomas – lead vocals
- Fabrizio Grossi – keyboards (1–3, 5–10), guitars (1, 10), bass, backing vocals, additional guitars (2, 3, 5, 7–9)
- Rob Vanni – lead guitars (1–3, 5, 8–10)
- JM Scattolin – guitars (2, 3, 5, 8, 9), additional guitars (6)
- Neal Schon – guitars (4)
- Steve Lukather – guitars (6)
- Richie Kotzen – guitars (7)
- Kenny Wilkerson – bass (3, 5)
- Biggs Brice – drums
- Frances Benitez – backing vocals
- Josh Johnston – backing vocals

=== Production ===
- Mario De Riso – executive producer
- Serafino Perugino – executive producer
- Fabrizio Grossi – producer, arrangements, recording, mixing
- Luigi Stefanini – mastering at New Sin Studios (Treviso, Italy)
- Giulio Cataldo – artwork
- Alex Solca – photography
