= Loveless Fascination =

Studio album by Starship
- Released: September 17, 2013
- Genres: Pop; rock
- Length: 46:47
- Labels: Loud & Proud
- Producers: Jeff Pilson; Mickey Thomas

Starship chronology
Greatest Hits (Ten Years and Change 1979–1991) (1991)	Loveless Fascination (2013)

Singles from Loveless Fascination
- 1. "It's Not the Same as Love" Released: 2013

Loveless Fascination is the fourth studio album by American rock band Starship. It was released on September 17, 2013, through Loud & Proud Records. The album is the first studio release of new material from the band since 1989's Love Among the Cannibals, with Mickey Thomas as the lone remaining holdover from the group's 1980's line-up.

Loveless Fascination was produced by longtime Foreigner bassist Jeff Pilson, who was the main songwriter on the album, and helped contribute a harder edge to the band's sound. Frontman Thomas said "It's been a long time coming. With each passing year, the bar was raised higher and higher for this album. I'd be lying if I didn't tell you the expectations caused me a few sleepless nights."

All tracks were produced and engineered by Pilson at Pilsound Studios in Santa Clarita, California, as well as being mixed and mastered by Wyn Davis at Total Access Recording Studios in Redondo Beach, except "You Never Know" and "Nothin' Can Keep Me from You", which were produced by Mickey Thomas and engineered and mixed by Vinnie Castaldo at The Tone Factory in Las Vegas.

"You Never Know" is a Richard Page co-composition and "Nothin' Can Keep Me from You" was written by Diane Warren for Detroit Rock City and previously recorded by Kiss.

== Track listing ==
All songs written and composed by Jeff Pilson, unless otherwise noted.

No.	Title	Writer(s)	Length
1.	"It's Not the Same as Love"		4:52
2.	"How Do You Sleep?"		4:28
3.	"Loveless Fascination"		3:38
4.	"What Did I Ever Do?"		4:54
5.	"Technicolor Black and White"		5:08
6.	"Where Did We Go Wrong?"		4:49
7.	"How Will I Get By?"		4:33
8.	"You Never Know"	Niklas Jared; Richard Page; David Stenmark	4:33
9.	"You Deny Me"		4:21
10.	"Nothin' Can Keep Me from You"	Diane Warren	5:31

== Personnel ==
- Mickey Thomas – lead vocals, guitar; production (tracks 8, 10)
- Stephanie Calvert – lead vocals
- Darrell Verdusco – drums, backing vocals
- Phil Bennett – keyboards, backing vocals
- Jeff Adams – bass, vocals
- John Roth – guitar, backing vocals

Special guest

- Jeff Pilson – guitar, bass, keyboards, vocals; production (tracks 1–7, 9)

Additional personnel

- Mark Abrahamian – guitar
- Mark Schulman – drums
- Chris Frazier – drums
- John Wedemeyer – guitar
