= Love Among the Cannibals =

Studio album by Starship
- Released: August 15, 1989
- Recorded: 1988–1989
- Studios: Studio 55 (Hollywood); Record Plant Studios and Studio D (Sausalito, California); Different Fur (San Francisco); The Kiva and Soundcastle (Los Angeles); Fantasy Studios (Berkeley, California); Maison Rouge (London)
- Genres: Arena rock; pop rock; AOR
- Length: 53:27
- Label: RCA
- Producers: Mike Shipley; Larry Klein; Starship; Phil Galdston; Tom Lord-Alge; Arne Frager (co-producer)

Starship chronology
No Protection (1987)	Love Among the Cannibals (1989)	Greatest Hits (Ten Years and Change 1979–1991) (1991)

Singles from Love Among the Cannibals
- 1. "Wild Again" Released: December 1988; 2. "It's Not Enough" Released: July 1989; 3. "I Didn't Mean to Stay All Night" Released: November 1989

Professional ratings
Review scores
Source	Rating
AllMusic	3/5 stars
Hi-Fi News & Record Review	A:2

Love Among the Cannibals is the third studio album by American rock band Starship. It was released on August 15, 1989, through RCA Records. The album was Starship's first after Grace Slick's departure from the band, and their last full-length studio release until Loveless Fascination in 2013. The album marks a shift in the band's musical direction, featuring a harder edged, AOR style as opposed to the synth pop of their first two albums. Another departure from the preceding albums is the decrease in outside writers, as this album features four songs written by Thomas, Morgan, or Chaquico.

The song "Wild Again" had previously been produced for the soundtrack to Cocktail (1988), and was included as a bonus track for the album's CD release. The album had one top-20 single on the Billboard charts, "It's Not Enough", which peaked at No. 12 in October 1989 and was their final top-40 hit, but the album itself only climbed to No. 64 and single "I Didn't Mean to Stay All Night" was No. 75. The track "I'll Be There" was featured in the end credits of Gross Anatomy (1989).

== Critical reception ==
In an October 1989 review, Andrew Martin of Music Week said that the music of the album had no connection with previous incarnations of the group (Jefferson Airplane and Jefferson Starship) but noted that it is still full of "pleasant tunes".

== Singles ==
- "Wild Again" (1988) (single only / no video)
- "It's Not Enough" (1989)
- "I Didn't Mean to Stay All Night" (1989)
- "I'll Be There" (1989) (single only / no video)

== Track listing ==
No.	Title	Writer(s)	Producer(s)	Length
1.	"The Burn"	Martin Page; Bernie Taupin	Mike Shipley	4:24
2.	"It's Not Enough"	Martin Page; Tommy Funderburk	Shipley; Larry Klein	4:51
3.	"Trouble in Mind"	Joel Feeney; Tim Thorney; Rachel Oldfield	Tom Lord-Alge; Starship	4:35
4.	"I Didn't Mean to Stay All Night"	Robert "Mutt" Lange	Shipley; Klein	4:51
5.	"Send a Message"	Mickey Thomas; Mark Morgan; Steve Diamond	Lord-Alge; Starship	4:50
6.	"Wild Again"	John Bettis; Michael Clark	Phil Galdston; Starship	4:44
7.	"Love Among the Cannibals"	Thomas; Morgan	Starship	3:43
8.	"Dream Sequence" / "We Dream in Color"	Morgan /: Thomas; Morgan; Phil Galdston	Starship	1:29/4:58
9.	"Healing Waters"	Martin Page	Lord-Alge; Starship	4:57
10.	"Blaze of Love"	Chris Thompson; John Van Tongeren; Galdston	Lord-Alge; Starship	4:34
11.	"I'll Be There"	Thomas; Craig Chaquico; Diamond	Lord-Alge; Starship	5:31
Total length:				53:27

== Personnel ==
- Mickey Thomas – lead vocals
- Craig Chaquico – guitars
- Donny Baldwin – drums, backing vocals
- Mark Morgan – keyboards
- Brett Bloomfield – bass, backing vocals

This would be Baldwin's final album with the band, fired after assaulting Thomas during a stop on tour. Thomas's resulting injuries would cancel or postpone multiple concerts.

=== Additional personnel ===
- Pete Woodroffe – electronics on "The Burn"
- Michael Landau – additional rhythm guitar on "The Burn"
- Tommy Funderburk – additional backing vocal on "The Burn", "It's Not Enough" and "I Didn't Mean to Stay All Night"
- Larry Klein – Fairlight programming on "It's Not Enough" and "I Didn't Mean to Stay All Night"
- Collyer Spreen – electronics on "Trouble In Mind", "Send a Message", "Healing Waters" and "Blaze of Love"
- Robert John "Mutt" Lange – backing vocals on "I Didn't Mean to Stay All Night"
- Sammy Merendino – electronics on "Wild Again"
- Chris Thompson – additional backing vocals on "Wild Again"
- Jeff Pescetto – additional backing vocals on "Wild Again"
- Greg Shaw – electronics and trumpet on "Love Among the Cannibals", Synclavier on "Love Among the Cannibals" and "We Dream In Color"
- Tom Lord-Alge – additional backing vocal on "Healing Waters"

=== Production ===
- Starship – producer on "Trouble in Mind", "Send a Message", "Wild Again", "Love Among the Cannibals", "We Dream In Color", "Healing Waters", "Blaze of Love" and "I'll Be There"
- Mike Shipley – producer, engineer, mixer on "The Burn", "It's Not Enough" and "I Didn't Mean to Stay All Night"; mixer on "Wild Again"
- Larry Klein – producer on "It's Not Enough" and "I Didn't Mean to Stay All Night"; arranger on "The Burn" and "It's Not Enough"
- Tom Lord-Alge – producer, engineer, mixer on "Trouble In Mind", "Send a Message", "Healing Waters", "Blaze of Love" and "I'll Be There"
- Phil Galdston – producer on "Wild Again"
- Arne Frager – co-producer, engineer on "Love Among the Cannibals" and "We Dream In Color"
- Robert John "Mutt" Lange – arranger on "I Didn't Mean to Stay All Night"
- Stephan Benben – engineer on "Wild Again"
- Paul Lani – mixer on "Love Among the Cannibals" and "We Dream In Color"
- Pete Woodroffe – additional engineering on "The Burn"
- Greg Laney – assistant engineer on "The Burn"
- Rob Beaton – assistant engineer on "The Burn"; additional engineering on "Love Among the Cannibals" and "We Dream In Color"
- Mark Slagle – assistant engineer on "The Burn", "Trouble In Mind", "Send a Message", "Healing Waters", "Blaze of Love" and "I'll Be There"
- Julie Last – assistant engineer on "It's Not Enough"
- Randy Wine – assistant engineer on "Trouble In Mind"
- Tom Sadzeck – assistant engineer on "Trouble In Mind", "Healing Waters" and "Blaze of Love"
- Michael Semanick – assistant engineer on "Trouble In Mind", "Send a Message", "Healing Waters", "Blaze of Love" and "I'll Be There"
- Tony Phillips – additional engineering on "I Didn't Mean to Stay All Night"
- Greg Wilkinson – assistant engineer on "I Didn't Mean to Stay All Night"
- Paula "Max" Garcia – assistant engineer on "I Didn't Mean to Stay All Night"
- Jim "Watts" Vereecke – assistant engineer on "Wild Again"
- Tom Size – assistant engineer on "Wild Again"
- Joe Fiorello – assistant re-mix engineer on "Wild Again"
- Michael Rosen – assistant engineer on "Wild Again"
- Mastered by Greg Fulginiti at Artisan Sound Recorders
- Bill Thompson – manager
- Bill Laudner – tour manager
- Geoff Grace – guitar tech
- Linda Lalli – office manager, assistant to manager
- Stephen M. Coats – controller
- Ralph Pavoni – production manager
- Collyer Spreen – keyboard tech
- Sue Pemberton – administrative and publicity assistant
- Ria Lewerke – creative director
- Norman Moore – design & art direction
- Taylor King – photography
- Lisa Avila Baldwin – make-up

=== Studios ===
==== Recording ====
- "The Burn" recorded at Studio 55, Hollywood, The Plant Recording Studios, Sausalito, and Different Fur, San Francisco
- "It's Not Enough" recorded at The Kiva, Los Angeles and Soundcastle, Los Angeles
- "Trouble In Mind", "Healing Waters", and "Blaze of Love" recorded at The Plant Recording Studios, Sausalito, Different Fur, San Francisco, and Fantasy Studios, Berkeley
- "I Didn't Mean to Stay All Night" recorded at The Kiva, Los Angeles and Maison Rouge, London
- "Send a Message" and "I'll Be There" recorded at Fantasy Studios, Berkeley and Different Fur, San Francisco
- "Wild Again" recorded at Studio D, Sausalito and Fantasy Studios, Berkeley
- "Love Among the Cannibals" and "We Dream In Color" recorded at The Plant Recording Studios, Sausalito

==== Mixing ====
- "The Burn" mixed at Mayfair Studios, London
- "It's Not Enough" mixed at A&M Recording Studios, Los Angeles
- "Trouble In Mind" and "I'll Be There" mixed at The Hit Factory, New York City
- "Send a Message", "Healing Waters" and "Blaze of Love" mixed at Different Fur, San Francisco
- "I Didn't Mean to Stay All Night" mixed at Battery Studios, London
- "Wild Again" mixed at Soundcastle, Los Angeles
- "Love Among the Cannibals" and "We Dream In Color" mixed at Larrabee Sound, Los Angeles

== Charts ==
Chart (1989)	Peak position
Canada Top Albums/CDs (RPM)	80
Finnish Albums (Suomen virallinen lista)	21
Swedish Albums (Sverigetopplistan)	26
US Billboard 200	64

=== Singles ===
"Wild Again"

Chart (1988–1989)	Peak position
US Billboard Hot 100	73
US Mainstream Rock (Billboard)	30

"It's Not Enough"

Chart (1989)	Peak position
US Billboard Hot 100	12
US Adult Contemporary (Billboard)	30
US Mainstream Rock (Billboard)	10

"I Didn't Mean to Stay All Night"

Chart (1989–1990)	Peak position
US Billboard Hot 100	75
