= Les Garland =

American Entertainment Executive

- Garland
- Born: U.S.
- Occupation: Entertainment executive
- Known for: MTV and radio

Les Garland is an American entertainment executive who is the founder and CEO of AfterPlay Entertainment, a media and entertainment consulting practice. Garland was an executive or co-founder of networks including MTV, VH1, The Box, Music Television You Control (previously Video Jukebox Network), and College Television Networks.

== Career ==
=== Radio ===
In his early days in radio, Garland was discovered by radio giants Bill Drake and Paul Drew. From there he became the program director of four major market radio stations including K-100 Los Angeles, CKLW Windsor, Ontario, WRKO Boston, and KFRC San Francisco

In San Francisco, KFRC took the place as the top rated radio station in Northern California and was named Radio Station of the Year. Garland created a KFRC promotional titled "Close Encounters", which announced that the station would go silent in order to communicate with extraterrestrials.

From KFRC, Garland was hired by label founder Ahmet Ertegun and label chief Doug Morris to manage West Coast operations for Atlantic Records. At that time, Atlantic was home to Led Zeppelin, The Rolling Stones, Genesis, ABBA, Aretha Franklin, Foreigner, The Spinners, Crosby, Stills, Nash & Young, and AC/DC.

=== MTV ===
After Atlantic Records, Garland moved back to the east coast becoming a founder of MTV Music Television, and VP of programming. While at MTV, Garland set celebrity profiles for ad gurus George Lois, Dale Pon, and Fred Siebert's anthemic "I Want My MTV" marketing campaign. Along as a founder, Garland and Robert Pittman, served as MTV's senior executive vice president, Garland was executive producer of the first six MTV Video Music Awards and oversaw all elements of programming. He was on the lead team that globalized the MTV brand with distribution into Europe, Asia and Australia. During his time at MTV he was asked to be the DJ voice embedded in the classic hit "We Built This City" by Starship.

=== Quantum Media, The Box, and Sputnik7.com ===
After MTV, Garland and Bob Pittman co-founded Quantum Media, launching popular television shows The Morton Downey Jr. Show, Streets, and the Marvin Hagler – Sugar Ray Leonard title fight. Following Quantum Media, he returned to music and television, orchestrating the national roll-out of The Box Music Network. Garland helped with the channel's domestic and global rollout, handling programming, promotion, sales and marketing. After The Box, Garland found digital music platform sputnik7.com with Chris Blackwell.

=== Later years ===
Garland leads mass media entertainment at his company AfterPlay Entertainment. Internationally, AfterPlay has contributed to the development of music initiatives for Bacardi International. Garland executive produced and was the voice of the 2011 Tom Petty Tour radio, television and media commercials.

In fall 2014, Garland co-founded and participated in the international launch of a new television programming service, called QYou, co-developed with former senior vice president and executive producer of FOX News Corporation, Scott Ehrlich, as well as former president of Lionsgate Digital, Curt Marvis.

He has appeared at college symposia including engagements at Brown University alongside Hunter S. Thompson and Walter Cronkite, and has been a featured speaker at the Billboard International Music Confab, the Montreux Jazz Festival, the Australian Radio Broadcasters, the New Music Seminar, the International Music & Media Conference and Austin's famed SXSW Conference. He also keynoted the ESPN Sports Radio Convention and was guest lecturer at the Electronic Arts worldwide marketing conference. Garland received the first of four invitations to appear in a unique internet lecture on the subject of "Sex, Race, and Rock in the USA" in a class taught by Professor Rebecca Sheehan at Australia's prestigious University of Sydney.

Garland has appeared in numerous publications including Vanity Fair, Time Magazine, GQ, People, USA Today, The New York Times, The Washington Post, Rolling Stone, and Thrillist, among others.

Garland is an avid golfer. He appeared on Golf Channel with Matt Ginella to talk about the best golf courses in the Ozarks. Garland helped oversee the renovation of Miami Beach's two public golf courses, the Miami Beach Golf Club and Normandy Shores, appointed by the City of Miami Beach in the early 2000s.

== Awards and honors ==
Garland was program director of the year while at KFRC. He also received a Clio for his creation of the promo "Close Encounters". Garland's appeared on Rolling Stone's list of the "Music Industry Heavy 100". In the 1990s while Garland served as Sputnik7.com president, the channel won a Webby for digital innovation. He received the Governor's Award for Lifetime Achievements at the 38th Annual Mid-America Emmy Awards.
