= No Protection (Starship album) =

Studio album by Starship
- Released: July 6, 1987
- Recorded: 1986–1987
- Studios: Washington Monument (San Rafael, California); Lighthouse, Goodnight L.A., Soundcastle Recording (Los Angeles); Fantasy (Berkeley, California); Manzanita (Arrington, Tennessee)
- Genres: Arena rock; pop rock
- Length: 49:44
- Labels: Grunt; RCA
- Producers: Keith Olsen; Narada Michael Walden; Peter Wolf

Starship chronology
Knee Deep in the Hoopla (1985)	No Protection (1987)	Love Among the Cannibals (1989)

Singles from No Protection
- 1. "Nothing's Gonna Stop Us Now" Released: January 19, 1987; 2. "It's Not Over ('Til It's Over)" Released: June 15, 1987; 3. "Beat Patrol" Released: September 1987; 4. "Set the Night to Music" Released: February 1988

Professional ratings
Review scores
Source	Rating
AllMusic	3/5 stars

No Protection is the second studio album by American rock band Starship. It was released on July 6, 1987, through Grunt Records and RCA Records. The album contains the number-one single "Nothing's Gonna Stop Us Now", and the top-10 single "It's Not Over ('Til It's Over)", the former of which appears in the fantasy comedy film Mannequin and the latter of which was a tune originally performed the previous year by one-time Manfred Mann's Earth Band frontman Chris Thompson for the soundtrack to the film Playing for Keeps. The third single "Beat Patrol" was #46 on the Billboard Hot 100.

This was the last album which was released through Grunt, and the final Starship album to feature vocalist Grace Slick, who left the band in 1988 and rejoined Jefferson Airplane for their reunion tour and self-titled reunion album, Jefferson Airplane, in 1989. The Diane Warren-penned ballad "Set the Night to Music" was covered in 1991 as a duet between R&B singer Roberta Flack and reggae singer Maxi Priest, released as a single from Flack's album Set the Night to Music. Cash Box said that the single "It's Not Over ('Til It's Over)" is "a soaring, anthemic rocker with a winning chorus."

== Track listing ==
No.	Title	Writer(s)	Producer(s)	Length
1.	"Beat Patrol"	Johnny Warman	Peter Wolf	4:25
2.	"Nothing's Gonna Stop Us Now"	Diane Warren; Albert Hammond	Narada Michael Walden	4:30
3.	"It's Not Over ('Til It's Over)"	Robbie Nevil; John Van Tongeren; Phil Galdston	Keith Olsen	4:17
4.	"Girls Like You"	Craig Chaquico; Steve Diamond; Mickey Thomas	P. Wolf	4:16
5.	"Wings of a Lie"	P. Wolf; Ina Wolf	P. Wolf	4:58
6.	"The Children"	Martin Page; Clif Magness	P. Wolf	5:40
7.	"I Don't Know Why"	Grace Slick; Jeff Pennig; Michael Luna	P. Wolf	4:08
8.	"Transatlantic"	Anton Fig; Galdston	Olsen	4:17
9.	"Say When" (CD-only bonus track)	David Roberts	Olsen	4:23
10.	"Babylon"	Slick; Tommy Funderburk; Larry Williams	Olsen	4:37
11.	"Set the Night to Music"	Warren	P. Wolf	4:47
Total length:				49:44

== Personnel ==
Per liner notes

- Mickey Thomas – lead vocals (1–6, 8, 9, 11), backing vocals (1, 2, 6, 7, 10, 11)
- Grace Slick – lead vocals (1, 2, 6, 7, 10, 11), backing vocals (1–6, 8, 9, 11)
- Craig Chaquico – guitar, backing vocals (5, 8–11)
- Donny Baldwin – electronic drums (1, 3, 4, 7, 8, 11), drums (5–7, 9, 11), backing vocals (2, 4, 7–11)

Additional personnel

- Pete Sears – bass (2)
- Peter Wolf – keyboards (1, 4–7, 11), synth bass (1, 5, 6), bass (4, 7, 11)
- Larry Williams – keyboards (3, 8–10)
- Bill Cuomo – keyboards, bass (3, 8, 9)
- Alan Pasqua – keyboards (3, 8, 9)
- Walter Afanasieff – keyboards (2)
- Corrado Rustici – Charvel MIDI guitar (2)
- Narada Michael Walden – electronic drums (2)
- Bongo Bob – drum sampling, percussion (2)
- Bret Bloomfield, Maxi Anderson, Siedah Garrett, Sharon Hendrix, Phillip Ingram, Clif Magness, Jeff Pescetto, Oren Waters, Ina Wolf – backing vocals (1, 4–7, 11)
- Tommy Funderburk – backing vocals (3, 8, 9)
- Kitty Beethoven, Jim Gilstrap – backing vocals (2)

Production

- Peter Wolf – producer (1, 4–7, 11)
- Keith Olsen – producer (3, 8–10)
- Narada Michael Walden – producer (2)
- Brian Malouf – engineer for Peter Wolf
- Ed Thacker, Dan Garcia, John VanNess – additional engineers for Peter Wolf
- Brian Foraker – engineer for Keith Olsen
- David Frazer – engineer for Narada Michael Walden
- Bino Espinoza, Dana Chapelle, David Luke, Steve Holroyd, Steve Krause, Ron Dasilva – assistant engineers
- Starship – arrangements (3, 8, 9)
- Larry Williams – arrangements (10)
- Skip Johnson – production coordinator
- Bernie Grundman – mastering engineer
- Raess Design (Ted Raess) – art direction
- Jeff Katz – photographer
- Lisa Marie Avila – make up
- Recorded at Lighthouse Studios, Goodnight L. A., Tarpan Studios, Soundcastle Recording Studio, Fantasy Studios, Manzanita Studios
- Mixed at Image Recorders
- "Nothing's Gonna Stop Us Now" mixed at Tarpan Studios
- Mastered at Bernie Grundman Mastering
- Michael Hill – reissue liner notes
- Dalita Keumurian – reissue project director
- Bill Lacey – reissue audio restoration
- Paul Williams – reissue coordination vocal

== Charts ==
=== Weekly charts ===
Chart (1987)	Peak position
Australian Albums (Kent Music Report)	43
Canada Top Albums/CDs (RPM)	12
Dutch Albums (Album Top 100)	64
European Albums (Music & Media)	22
Finnish Albums (Suomen virallinen lista)	12
German Albums (Offizielle Top 100)	20
Norwegian Albums (VG-lista)	6
Swedish Albums (Sverigetopplistan)	7
Swiss Albums (Schweizer Hitparade)	11
UK Albums (Official Charts)	26
US Billboard 200	12

=== Year-end charts ===
Chart (1987)	Position
Canada Top Albums/CDs (RPM)	55

== Certifications ==
Region	Certification	Certified units/sales
Canada (Music Canada)	Gold	50,000^{^}
New Zealand (RMNZ)	Gold	7,500^{‡}
United States (RIAA)	Gold	500,000^{^}
^{^} Shipments figures based on certification alone.^{‡} Sales+streaming figures based on certification alone.
