= Nuclear Furniture =

Studio album by Jefferson Starship
- Released: June 1984
- Recorded: 1984 at the Automatt, San Francisco
- Genre: Hard rock, AOR
- Length: 42:46
- Label: Grunt
- Producer: Ron Nevison

Jefferson Starship chronology
Winds of Change (1982)	Nuclear Furniture (1984)	Deep Space / Virgin Sky (1995)

Nuclear Furniture is the eighth album by American rock band Jefferson Starship, released in June 1984 through Grunt Records. It was the final album by the band before the departure of leader Paul Kantner and the eventual transition of the remaining members of the group to become Starship.

== Background ==
Produced by Ron Nevison, the album was arranged with the help of Austrian producer Peter Wolf (unrelated to the J. Geils Band singer of the same name), who had previously worked with Grace Slick on her solo album Software. Wolf also contributed keyboard and synthesizer work to the album, although not an official part of the band. Wolf and his wife Ina also wrote the single "No Way Out", the first of many songs penned by the duo that took the future Starship in a more commercial direction.

As the album was being recorded, Paul Kantner became frustrated with the album's direction. Before the sessions came to a close, he stole the master tapes and drove with them around San Francisco for a few days, and would not return them until the band mixed the album in a way more to his liking. Shortly after the album's release, Kantner left the band, and he only appears in the first promotional video, "No Way Out". After the departure of Kantner, the band lost the "Jefferson" moniker and became Starship; there would not be another studio album released under the Jefferson Starship name until after Kantner reformed the band in 1992.

== Reception ==
Professional ratings
Review scores
Source	Rating
AllMusic	2/5 stars

Nuclear Furniture was released in 1984 and spawned the Top 40 single "No Way Out", which was also the first single by any incarnation of the band to hit No. 1 on the Mainstream Rock Tracks chart. The album itself reached No. 28.

Joseph McCombs of AllMusic described it as a "competent but rather forgettable collection of radio-friendly dual guitar/keyboard period pop tunes." McCombs said that the juxtaposition between Kantner's politically oriented songs and Thomas's more commercially oriented songs "makes for an intriguing if uneven album."

== Track listing ==
Side A
No.	Title	Lyrics	Music	Length
1.	"Layin' It on the Line"	Mickey Thomas, Craig Chaquico	Chaquico, Thomas	4:09
2.	"No Way Out"	Ina Wolf	Peter Wolf	4:22
3.	"Sorry Me, Sorry You"	Jeannette Sears	Pete Sears	4:07
4.	"Live and Let Live"	J. Sears	P. Sears	3:50
5.	"Connection"	Paul Kantner, Thomas	Kantner	4:27

Side B
No.	Title	Lyrics	Music	Length
1.	"Rose Goes to Yale"	Kantner, Ronnie Gilbert	Kantner	2:56
2.	"Magician"	Grace Slick	P. Wolf	3:23
3.	"Assassin"	J. Sears	P. Sears	3:52
4.	"Shining in the Moonlight"	Chaquico, Thomas	Chaquico	3:38
5.	"Showdown"	Slick	Slick	3:22
6.	"Champion"	Kantner, Gilbert	Kantner	4:40

== Personnel ==
- Mickey Thomas – lead (1–5, 8, 9, 11) and backing vocals, spoken word (11)
- Grace Slick – lead (3, 5, 7, 8, 10, 11) and backing vocals, spoken word (11)
- Paul Kantner – lead (5, 6, 11) and backing vocals, rhythm guitar, banjo (11), spoken word (11)
- Craig Chaquico – lead guitar, spoken word (11)
- David Freiberg – keyboards (2, 6, 8, 9, 11) Moog (5, 8), piano (9), backing vocals, spoken word (11)
- Pete Sears – bass, synthesizers (1, 3–5, 10) piano (5), backing vocals, spoken word (11)
- Donny Baldwin – drums (1–6, 8–11), hand claps (1, 9), roto toms (1, 4, 5, 11), backing vocals, spoken word (11)

Additional personnel

- Peter Wolf – synthesizer programming, LinnDrum programming (1, 4, 9)
- Brian MacLeod – Simmons drums (7)

Production

- Jefferson Starship – arrangements
- Ron Nevison – producer, engineer, arrangements
- Peter Wolf – arrangements
- Maureen Droney – assistant engineer
- Kevin Eddy – assistant mixing engineer
- Mike Reese – mastering
- Pat Ieraci (Maurice) – production coordinator
- Rod Dyer, Clive Pierce / Dyer / Kahn, Inc. – cover design
- Tracks recorded at The Automatt, San Francisco
- Over-dubs and mixing at The Plant, Sausalito
- Mastered at The Mastering Lab, Hollywood
- Bill Thompson – manager

== Singles / music videos ==
- "No Way Out" (1984)
- "Layin' It on the Line" (1984)
- "Sorry Me, Sorry You" (1984)

== Charts ==
Chart (1984)	Peak position
US Billboard 200	28

== Certifications ==
Region	Certification	Certified units/sales
United States (RIAA)	Gold	500,000^{^}
^{^} Shipments figures based on certification alone.
