= Craig Chaquico =

American guitarist and songwriter (born 1954)

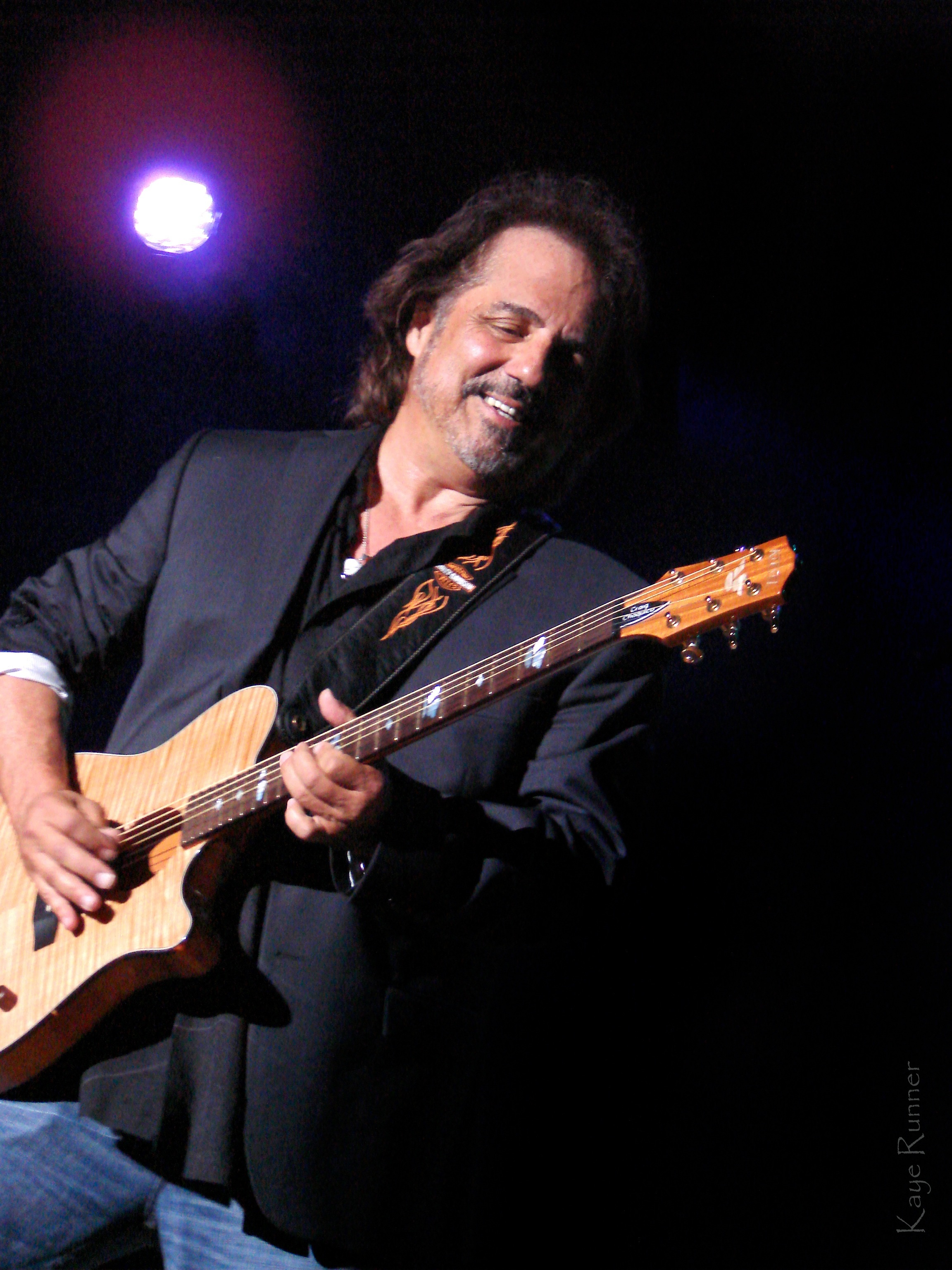
- Chaquico in 2016

Background information
- Born: September 26, 1954 (age 72); Sacramento, California, U.S.
- Genres: Rock, pop, blues, new age, smooth jazz
- Occupation: Guitarist
- Years active: 1971–present
- Labels: RCA, Sony, BMG, Capitol, Grunt, Higher Octave, Blind Pig
- Website: www.craigchaquico.com

Craig Clinton Chaquico (or Chaquiço, /tʃəˈkiːsoʊ/ chə-KEE-soh; born September 26, 1954) is an American guitarist, songwriter, and composer. From 1974 to 1990 he was lead guitarist for the rock bands Jefferson Starship and Starship. In 1993, he started a solo career as an acoustic jazz guitarist and composer.

== Early life, family and education ==
Chaquico was born and raised in Sacramento, California and attended La Sierra High School in the suburb of Carmichael. His mother Muriel was a state government employee, and his father Bill owned an upholstery business. Both were of Portuguese descent. He had an older brother named Howard. The household was a musical one; Chaquico recalls, "My mom and dad were musicians and played around the house all the time. I thought everybody played the piano and organ like Mom and the sax and accordion like Dad together after dinner." He began playing the guitar as a young boy, when his parents bought him his first guitar at the age of ten.

When Chaquico was twelve, the car he and his father were traveling in was hit head-on by a drunk driver. Both of his arms were broken, as were his leg, ankle, foot, wrist, and thumb. During physical therapy, his father told him that guitarist Les Paul had been in a car accident and had played guitar to help himself heal. His father promised to buy him a Les Paul guitar when he got better. Although he could play only the high E string of his acoustic guitar due to his casts, he benefited from playing, and his father kept his word about the Les Paul.

== Career ==
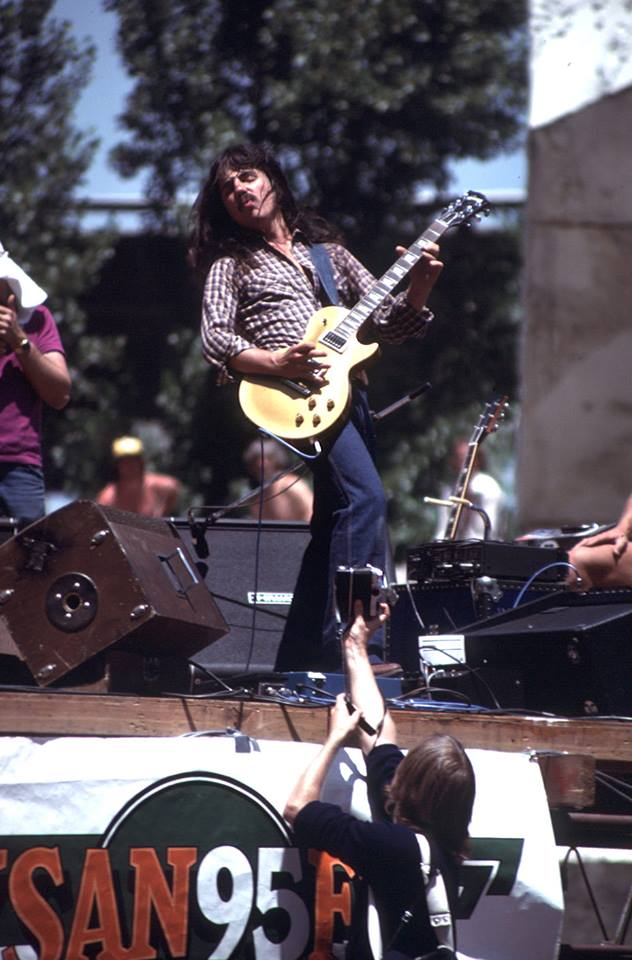
Chaquico with Jefferson Starship at KSAN95's Free Concert in Justin Herman Plaza, San Francisco - June 1, 1979

Chaquico began performing in clubs in his teens. His English teacher Jack Traylor asked him to join the band Steelwind, which performed in Sacramento and San Francisco Bay, and Traylor introduced him to Paul Kantner of Jefferson Airplane. Kantner invited him to a series of recording sessions. At 16 he recorded for the first time with Kantner and Grace Slick on their albums Sunfighter and Baron von Tollbooth & the Chrome Nun. He played on Slick's solo album Manhole in 1973. He played alongside Jerry Garcia, David Crosby, David Freiberg, and Carlos Santana.

After Jefferson Airplane broke up, its remaining members formed Jefferson Starship. Chaquico joined the band in 1974. Jefferson Starship released nine platinum and gold selling albums between 1974 and 1984, including Red Octopus, which was certified double-platinum in 1995. He wrote or co-wrote "Fast Buck Freddy", "Love Too Good", "Rock Music", "Jane", "Find Your Way Back", and "Layin' It on the Line".

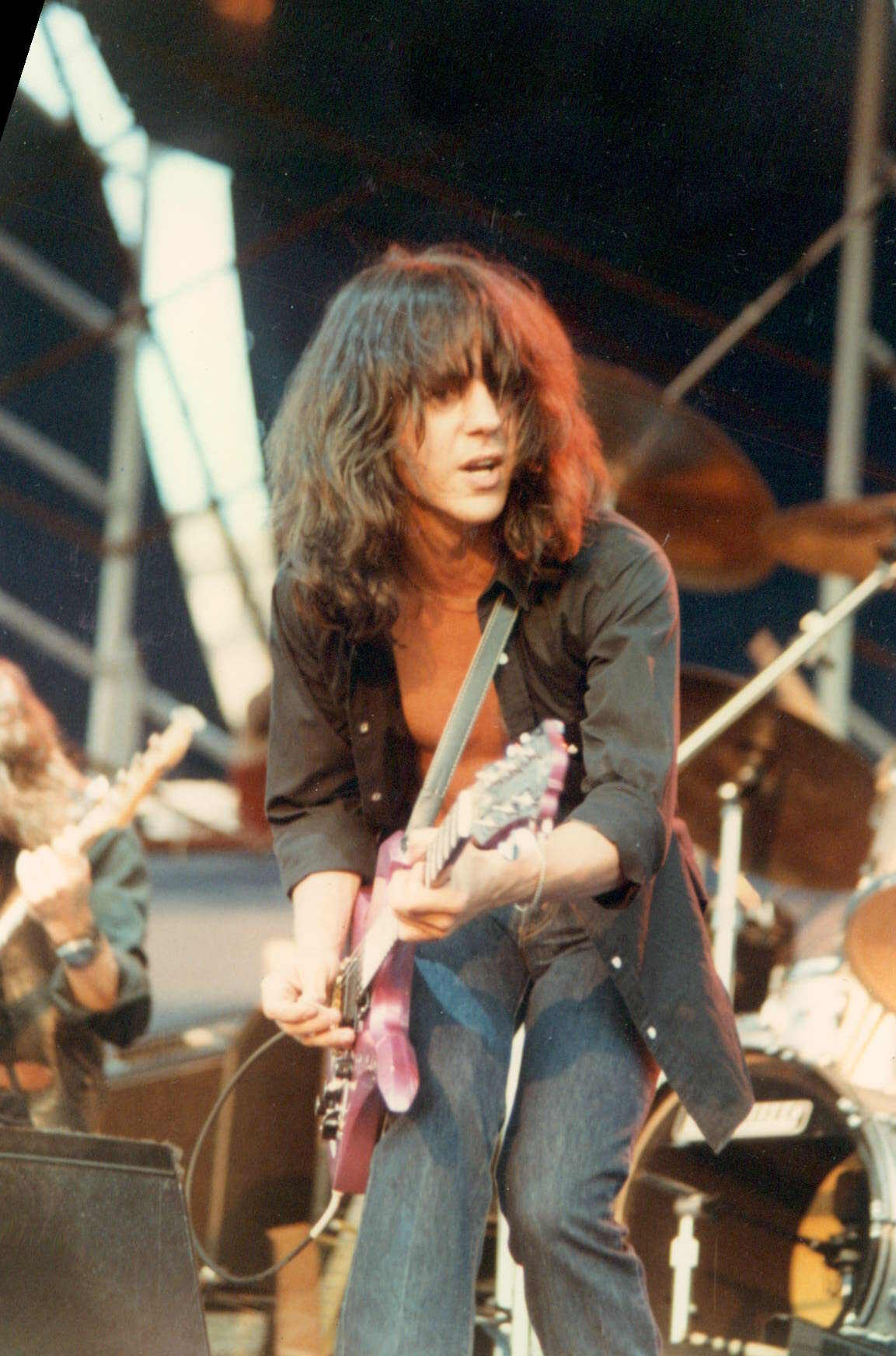
Chaquico in 1981

The name "Jefferson Starship" was retired in March 1985 after Kantner left the band and sued the remaining members, who reformed under the name "Starship". All other band members, including Chaquico, remained with the band. Starship recorded hits such as "We Built This City", "Sara", and "Nothing's Gonna Stop Us Now". Chaquico and Starship appeared on MTV videos on a regular basis and performed at the first MTV Spring Break special in Daytona Beach in 1986. Chaquico left Starship in 1990.

Having become disappointed with the direction Starship was going, Chaquico formed Big Bad Wolf and recorded one album in that band. He began a solo career that explored world music, new age, and contemporary jazz. His first album, Acoustic Highway (1993), was the number one Independent New Age Album of the Year in Billboard Magazine and a number one on the Billboard New Age Albums chart, while his second album, Acoustic Planet (1994), reached number one on the same chart and received a Grammy Award nomination for Best New Age Album. The album borrowed from African and Native American music. The song "Just One World" was launched into space on a satellite that was part of NASA's Space Ark program.

In 2017 Chaquico filed suit against the remaining members of Jefferson Starship, including David Freiberg and Donny Baldwin, over the use of the band name on tour billings and merchandise, citing the 1985 agreement to retire the band name. In 2018 the suit was dismissed after an undisclosed settlement was reached.

In August 2022, Chaquico filed a lawsuit against Jefferson Starship Incorporated, as well as a number of former bandmates, music companies, and managers. In the suit, Chaquico claimed he was owed over $20 million in royalties. On March 25, 2024, the court granted a motion for summary judgment in favor of the defendants.

== Guitars ==
Chaquico's first guitar was a Winston acoustic which his mother bought for him when he was ten years old after he'd given up his parents' idea that he would play an accordion. He played a '57 Les Paul Goldtop on the first two Jefferson Starship albums and tours, Dragon Fly (1974) and Red Octopus (1975), on such songs as "Miracles". He also soon added a rare '59 Les Paul Sunburst to his collection which he played on the next two albums, Spitfire (1976) and Earth (1978) and can be heard on such songs as "With Your Love", "Count on Me", and "Runaway". Both Les Paul Guitars and the Bassman amps, along with several other valuable guitars, were stolen and/or destroyed in a riot in Lorelei, Germany, in 1978, when Grace Slick was unable to perform and the show was cancelled. Into the '80s, Chaquico was sponsored by Carvin Guitars and often appeared on tour, in the studio and in guitar magazine ads playing a Carvin V220 or a Carvin koa doubleneck played through Carvin amplifiers, his favorite being the Carvin X100B. Carvin released a Craig Chaquico Signature acoustic guitar, which continued to be produced after Carvin's evolution into Kiesel Guitars.

== Philanthropy ==
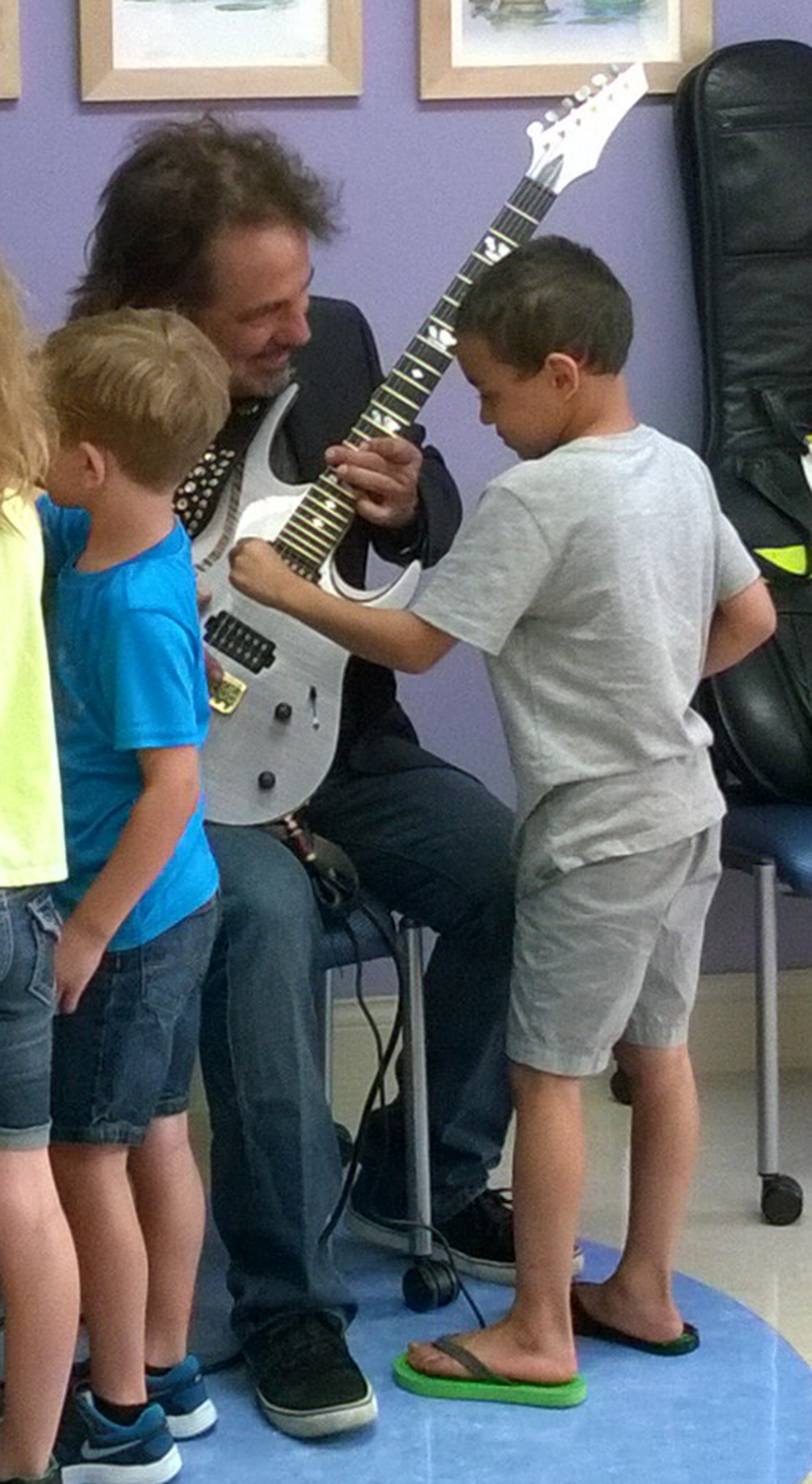
Chaquico at Renown Children's Hospital in Reno, Nevada, 2016

Chaquico became a believer in the healing power of music after recovering from a car crash when he was twelve. With the National Association of Music Therapy, Beamz, Remo, and Washburn Guitars, he provided instruments to patients in hospitals. He has worked with organizations such as the American Music Therapy Association and Memory and Music which use music therapy with injured and traumatized people and those with various forms of dementia.

== Awards and honors ==
Jazziz Magazine named him one of the 100 most influential jazz guitarists of all time. He was named Best Pop Instrumental Guitarist in Guitar Player magazine's 1997 Readers' Poll.

== Discography ==
- Acoustic Highway (Higher Octave, 1993)
- Acoustic Planet (Higher Octave, 1994)
- A Thousand Pictures (Higher Octave, 1996)
- Once in a Blue Universe (Higher Octave, 1997)
- From the Redwoods to the Rockies with Russ Freeman (Windham Hill, 1998)
- Four Corners (Higher Octave, 1999)
- Shadow and Light (Higher Octave, 2002)
- Midnight Noon (Higher Octave, 2004)
- Holiday (Higher Octave, 2005)
- Follow the Sun (Shanachie, 2009)
- Fire Red Moon (Blind Pig, 2012)

With Jefferson Starship

- Dragon Fly (Grunt, 1974)
- Red Octopus (Grunt, 1975)
- Spitfire (Grunt, 1976)
- Earth (Grunt, 1978)
- Freedom at Point Zero (Grunt, 1979)
- Modern Times (Grunt, 1981)
- Winds of Change (Grunt, 1982)
- Nuclear Furniture (Grunt, 1984)

With Starship

- Knee Deep in the Hoopla (Grunt, 1985)
- No Protection (RCA/Grunt, 1987)
- Love Among the Cannibals (RCA, 1989)

With Paul Kantner, Grace Slick

- Sunfighter (Grunt, 1971)
- Baron von Tollbooth & the Chrome Nun (Grunt, 1973)

With Grace Slick

- Manhole (Grunt, 1973)

With Jack Traylor and Steelwind

- Child of Nature (Grunt, 1973)

With Big Bad Wolf

- Big Bad Wolf (1998)

=== As guest ===
With 3rd Force

- 3rd Force (Higher Octave, 1994)
- Force of Nature (Higher Octave, 1995)
- Vital Force (Higher Octave, 1997)
- Force Field (Higher Octave, 1999)
- Gentle Force (Higher Octave, 2002)

With others

- Joan Burton, Only a Moment Away (1993)
- Commander Cody and His Lost Planet Airmen, Rock 'n Roll Again (1977)
- Cusco, Apurimac III: Nature Spirit Pride (1997)
- Russ Freeman, From the Redwoods to the Rockies (1998)
- Gregg Rolie, Gregg Rolie (1985)
- Tom Scott, New Found Freedom (2002)
- Mickey Thomas, Alive Alone (1981)

== See also ==
- List of ambient music artists
