= Mickey Thomas (singer) =

American rock singer (born 1949)

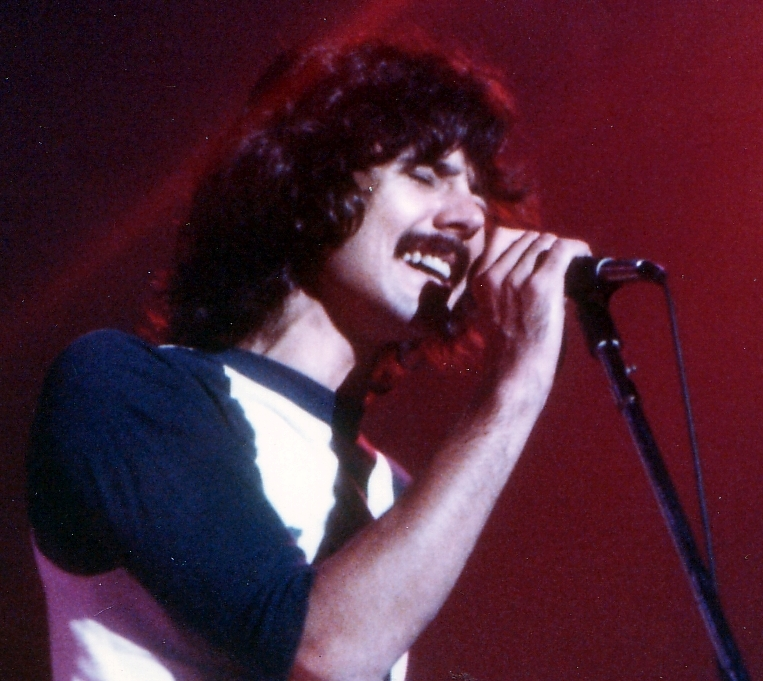
- Thomas performing in 1977

Background information
- Born: John Michael Thomas; December 3, 1949 (age 76); Cairo, Georgia, U.S.
- Genres: Rock, blues rock, soft rock
- Occupations: Musician, singer, songwriter
- Years active: 1965–present
- Member of: Starship
- Formerly of: Jefferson Starship

John Michael Thomas (born December 3, 1949) is an American rock singer. He is best known as one of the lead vocalists of Jefferson Starship and Starship, the latter of which he is the last remaining original member. Before joining Jefferson Starship, he was a member of Elvin Bishop's band as a backing and occasional lead vocalist. He was the lead singer on Bishop's best-known song, "Fooled Around and Fell in Love".

== Early life ==
John Michael Thomas was born in Cairo, Georgia, on December 3, 1949. He was inspired to pursue a career in music after traveling to Atlanta with longtime childhood friends Charles Connell and Tommy Verran to see a Beatles performance in 1965. Thomas, Connell, and Verran formed their first band together; Verran was the lead vocalist. They disbanded while attending different colleges, but later reformed in the early 1970s along with friend Bud Thomas as the Jets.

Thomas was the vocalist for the Lords of London, a garage band from Douglas, Georgia, for a brief time.

== Career ==
=== Elvin Bishop Group ===
While singing lead for the Jets in 1974, Thomas joined the Elvin Bishop Group as a backing vocalist and eventually made it to lead vocals. He sang lead vocals on the 1975 Elvin Bishop single "Silent Night" and the 1976 single "Spend Some Time", but his best-known achievement was singing on Bishop's chart hit "Fooled Around and Fell in Love", a No. 3 single in 1976.

=== Jefferson Starship & Starship ===
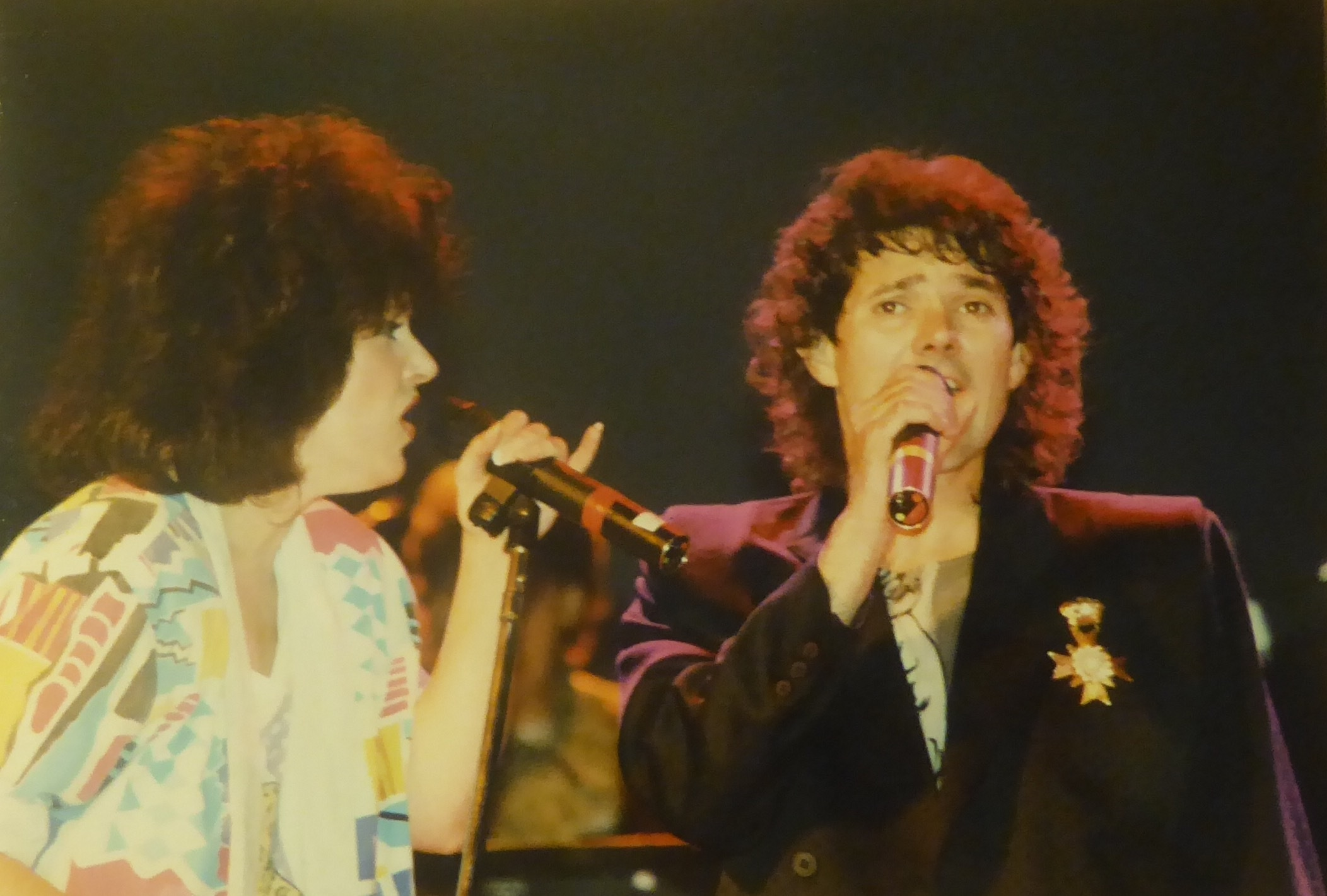
Grace Slick and Mickey Thomas onstage in 1985

Thomas recorded the solo album As Long as You Love Me in 1976. After leaving the Elvin Bishop Group, he recorded three songs for the 1978 film Skateboard, which also featured a cameo by Jefferson Starship guitarist Craig Chaquico. In April 1979, Thomas was asked to join that group after the departure of Marty Balin and Grace Slick. In 1981 he recorded his second solo album, Alive Alone. Former Elvin Bishop Group drummer Donny Baldwin became drummer for Jefferson Starship two years later when Aynsley Dunbar left.

Thomas spent most of the early 1980s as the main vocalist of Jefferson Starship, performing several duets with Slick (who rejoined in 1981) and gaining greater influence in the band. After Paul Kantner left in 1984, Thomas was leader of the band. Kantner sued over the name of Jefferson Starship, and the settlement left the band with the name Starship. From 1985 until 1989 the band had three No. 1 hit songs. When Slick left again in 1988, Thomas sang all lead vocals. The 1989 "Love Among the Cannibals" tour was postponed after Baldwin attacked Thomas in a bar. The damage was so severe that it required facial reconstruction surgery. Baldwin resigned after the incident.

=== Starship featuring Mickey Thomas ===
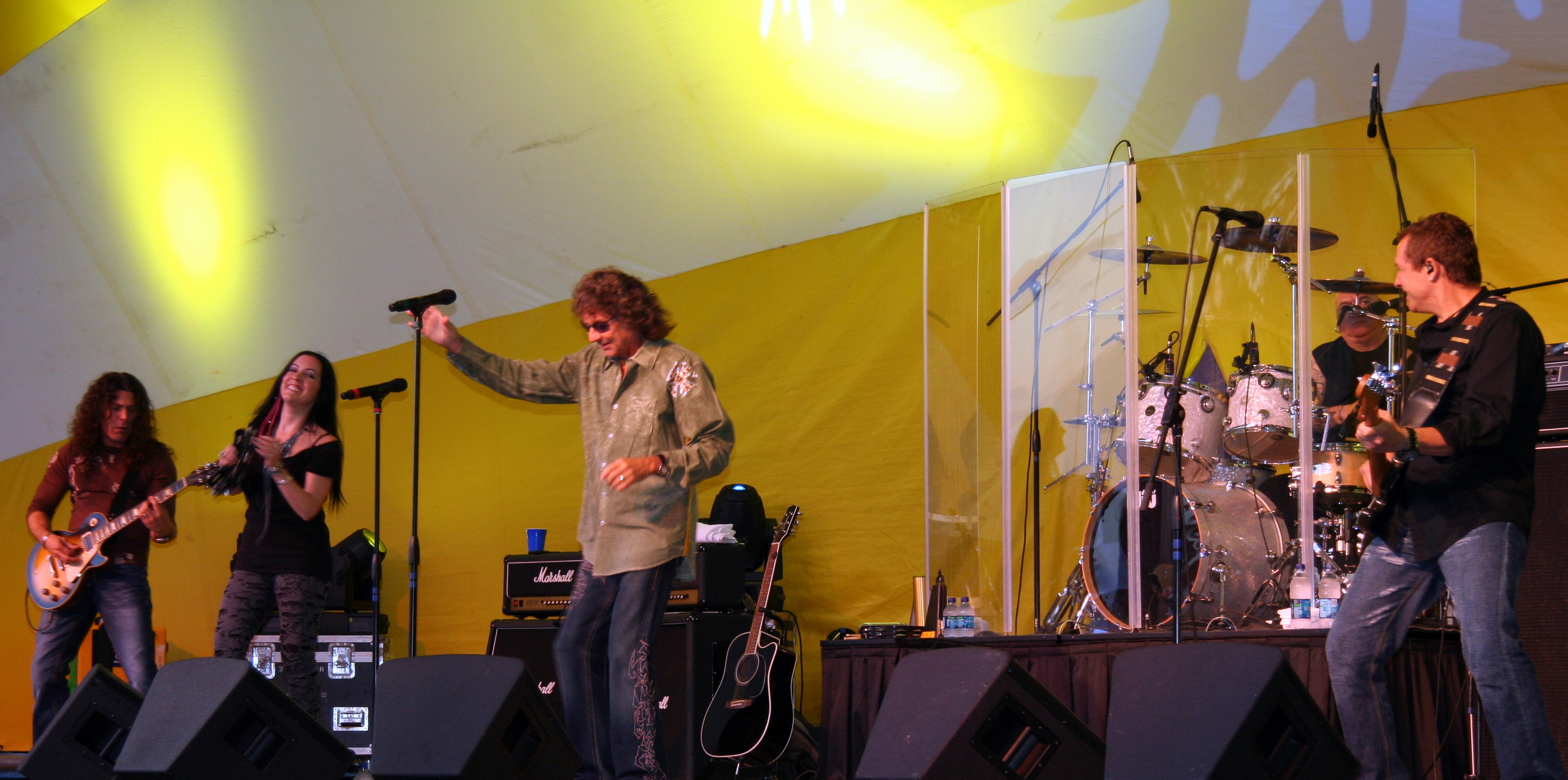
Starship featuring Mickey Thomas in 2010

Starship was let go by its record label RCA and became inactive in 1991. In early 1992, Mickey Thomas revived the group as Starship featuring Mickey Thomas and touring has continued with this title. The band's Loveless Fascination was released on September 17, 2013. The band performed at the Streamy Awards on September 8, 2014.

=== Other work ===
He was credited as performing a scat vocal on the Nitty Gritty Dirt Band album The Dirt Band. The song on which Thomas is credited is "For a Little While".

In 1985, Thomas appeared on The Heavenly Kid soundtrack performing the song "Two Minute Love". In 1986, he recorded the song "Stand in the Fire" for the Rob Lowe hockey movie Youngblood. Thomas recorded the title song for the 1989 film Sing. He appeared in the 1989 film Dream a Little Dream and recorded the film's title song and its duet version with Mel Tormé for the soundtrack. The duet version was also played during the end of the film.

In 1987, Thomas recorded "Only the Fool Survives" with Donna Summer for her album All Systems Go. Their duet was released as the album's second single.

In 1996, Thomas performed the opening theme for the Mighty Ducks animated series. In 1997, he guested on Sammy Hagar's album Marching to Mars.

in 1998, Thomas voiced the titular character in the children's series, Adventures with Kanga Roddy.

In 2002, Starship featuring Mickey Thomas re-recorded a selection of the Starship and Jefferson Starship hits on which he had appeared. The resulting album was released in 2003 as Forever Gold, part of a series of releases by St. Clair Entertainment Group. These recordings have been licensed to several labels, resulting in the release of Starship – Greatest Hits (Delta Records) and Starship – Greatest Hits (Brilliant Records). The original release of these recordings was as Starship – Greatest and Latest, available outside the U.S. only, and including both a CD and DVD.

In 2004, he released an album project, under the title of Over the Edge, produced by Fabrizio Grossi. In 2008, he recorded a new album with Aynsley Dunbar for Direct Music, featuring artists such as Jake E. Lee, former guitarist for Ozzy Osbourne. Thomas reunited with Elvin Bishop when Starship closed for them in late 2008.

In November 2010, Thomas announced on his website that a new Starship album, Loveless Fascination, would be released in late summer or early fall of 2011; the album was eventually released in September 2013. In July 2011, Thomas released Marauder, a solo project covering songs originally recorded by other artists.

== Discography ==
=== Studio albums ===
- As Long as You Love Me (1976)
- Alive Alone (1981)
- Over the Edge (2004)
- The Blues Masters Featuring Mickey Thomas (2010)
- Marauder (2011)
- A Classic Christmas (2024)

=== with Elvin Bishop Group ===
- Let It Flow (1974)
- Juke Joint Jump (1975)
- Struttin' My Stuff (1975)
- Hometown Boy Makes Good! (1976)
- Raisin' Hell (1977)

=== with Jefferson Starship ===
- Freedom at Point Zero (1979)
- Modern Times (1981)
- Winds of Change (1982)
- Nuclear Furniture (1984)

=== with Starship ===
- Knee Deep in the Hoopla (1985)
- No Protection (1987)
- Love Among the Cannibals (1989)
- Loveless Fascination (2013)
