= Donny Baldwin =

American drummer

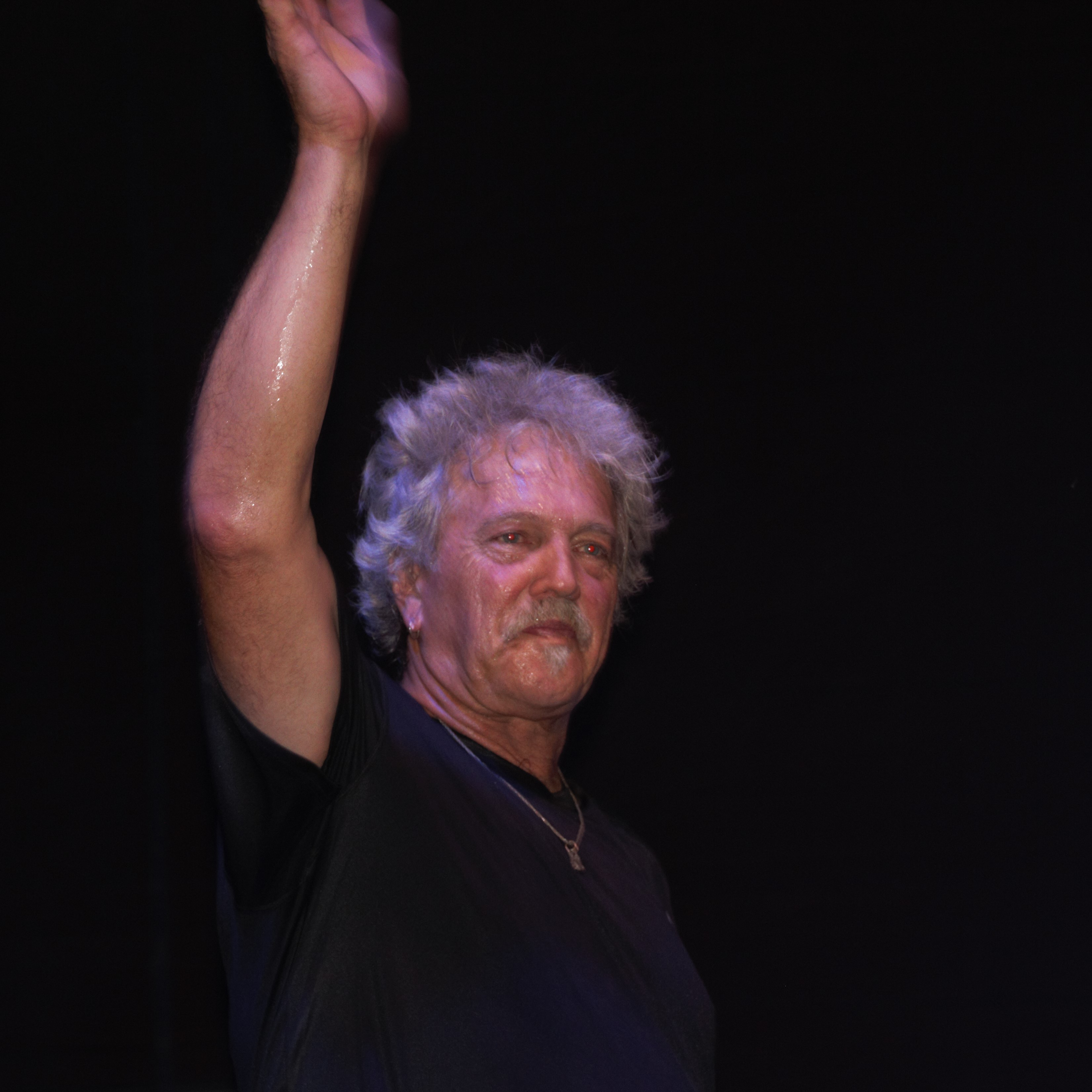
- Baldwin with Jefferson Starship in 2018

Background information
- Born: Donald Baldwin; June 22, 1951 (age 75)
- Origin: Palo Alto, California, U.S.
- Genres: Rock
- Occupation: Drummer
- Years active: 1971–present
- Formerly of: Elvin Bishop, Pablo Cruise, Jefferson Starship, Starship, Jerry Garcia Band, Cold Blood, 38 Special, Van Morrison

Donald Baldwin (born June 22, 1951) is an American drummer best known as a member of Jefferson Starship (1982–1984; 2008–present) and its continuation Starship (1984–1989).

== Early life ==
Baldwin was raised in Palo Alto, California. He attended Ellwood P. Cubberley High School and graduated in 1969.

== Career ==
Baldwin began his career as a drummer in 1971. He began playing for Elvin Bishop in 1973, where he worked with his future Jefferson Starship bandmate Mickey Thomas on the hit single "Fooled Around and Fell in Love". When the Elvin Bishop band disbanded, Baldwin joined the Santa Cruz band Snail and gigged around the Bay Area (including a stint with Pablo Cruise) until 1982. He also played for artists such as 38 Special, Van Morrison, Eddie Money, and Paul Rodgers.

After Aynsley Dunbar left Jefferson Starship in 1982, Baldwin replaced him and joined his old bandmate Thomas; he made his recorded debut with the band on the Nuclear Furniture LP in 1984. He remained with the band, which soon took the name Starship following Paul Kantner's departure, through the recording of their studio album, Love Among the Cannibals. In September 1989, Baldwin assaulted Thomas while Starship was on tour in Scranton, Pennsylvania. Thomas's injuries required reconstructive surgery on his face and head, and Baldwin was fired from the band. From February 1994 until its demise in April 1995, Baldwin drummed for the Jerry Garcia Band and then for Eddie Money.

Baldwin rejoined Kantner's reformed Jefferson Starship in early 2007, taking over for the departing Prairie Prince, and he performed on the tour in support of the 2008 studio album Jefferson's Tree of Liberty. Baldwin tours with Jefferson Starship as well as playing drums for Lydia Pense as a member of Cold Blood. In 2017, former Jefferson Starship band member Craig Chaquico filed suit against the other remaining members of the band, including David Freiberg and Baldwin, over the use of the Jefferson Starship band name on tour billings and merchandise, citing a 1985 agreement to retire the band name. On December 4, 2018, the lawsuit concerning the use of the name Jefferson Starship was dismissed after an undisclosed settlement was reached between Chaquico and the current members of the band.
