= Hot Tuna discography =

Band discography

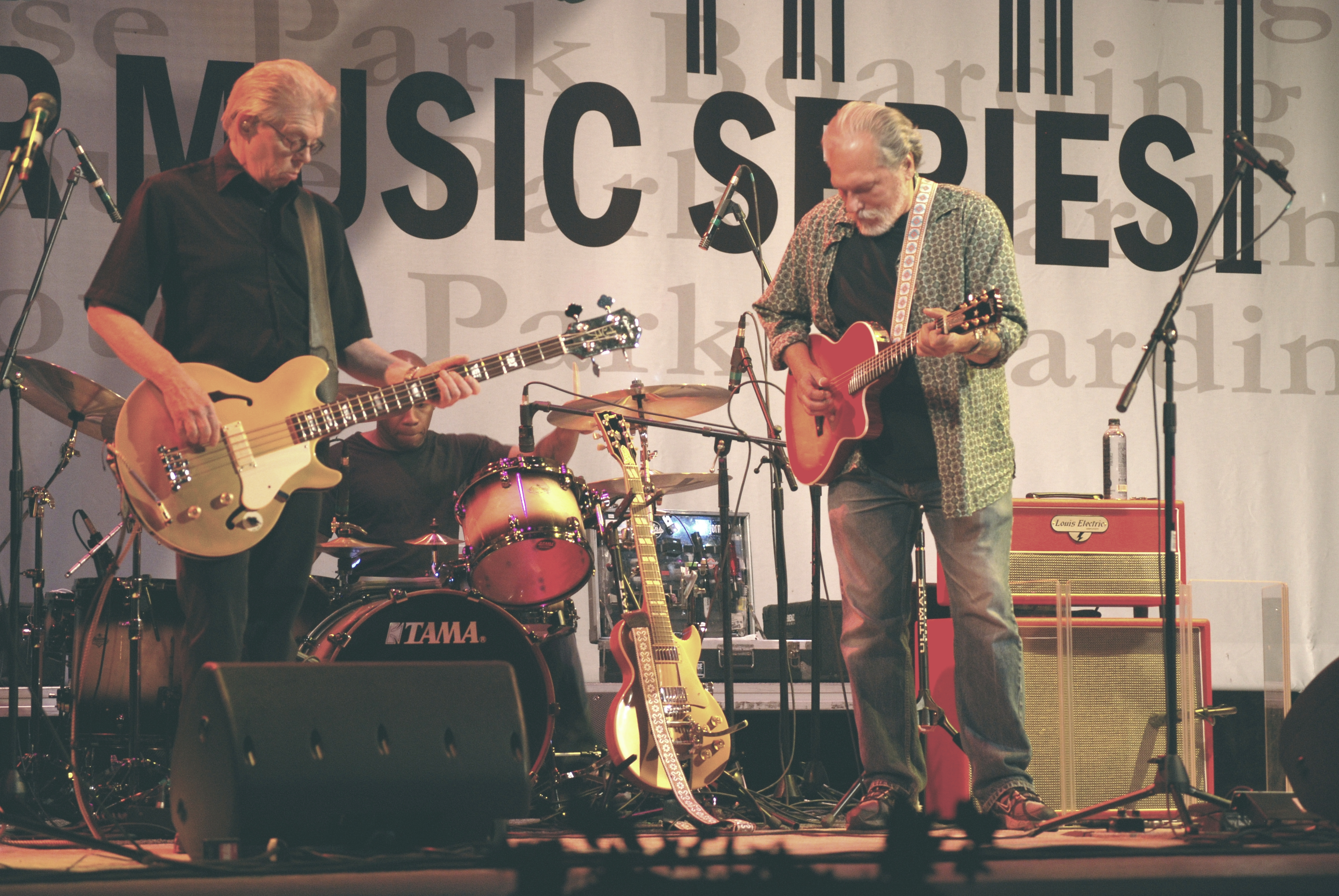
- Studio albums: 7
- Live albums: 14
- Compilation albums: 8

This is a discography for the American blues band Hot Tuna. In addition to 7 studio albums and 14 live albums, the group has released many of their live concerts directly for sale on iTunes.

== Studio albums ==
Year	Album details	Chart positions
Year	Album details	US
1972	Burgers	68
1974	The Phosphorescent Rat	148
1975	America's Choice	75
1975	Yellow Fever	97
1976	Hoppkorv	116
1990	Pair a Dice Found	—
2011	Steady as She Goes	—
"—" denotes releases that did not chart.

== Live albums ==
Year	Album details	Chart positions
Year	Album details	US
1970	Hot Tuna	30
1971	First Pull Up, Then Pull Down	43
1978	Double Dose	92
1992	Live at Sweetwater	—
1993	Live at Sweetwater Two	—
1997	Live in Japan	—
1999	And Furthurmore...	—
"—" denotes releases that did not chart.

== Archival live albums ==
Year	Album details
1984	Splashdown
1985	Historic Live Tuna
1996	Classic Hot Tuna Acoustic
1996	Classic Hot Tuna Electric
1997	Splashdown Two
2010	Live at New Orleans House: Berkeley, CA 09/69
2019	Bear's Sonic Journals: Before We Were Them

== Compilation albums ==
Year	Album details
1972	Fillmore: The Last Days
1977	Flight Log
1978	The Last Interview?
1979	Final Vinyl
1995	Trimmed & Burning
1996	In a Can
1998	The Best of Hot Tuna
2006	Keep on Truckin': The Very Best of Hot Tuna
2011	Setlist: The Very Best of Hot Tuna Live

== Collaborations of Hot Tuna members with other artists ==
Year	Album	Artist	Collaborators
1970	Blows Against the Empire	Paul Kantner & Jefferson Starship	Marty Balin, Jack Casady, Joey Covington, Peter Kaukonen
1971	If I Could Only Remember My Name	David Crosby	Casady, Jorma Kaukonen
1971	Bark	Jefferson Airplane	Casady, J. Kaukonen, Will Scarlett
1971	Sunfighter	Paul Kantner & Grace Slick	Casady, Covington, Creach, J. Kaukonen, P. Kaukonen
1971	Papa John Creach	Papa John Creach	Nick Buck, Casady, Covington, J. Kaukonen, Pete Sears, Sammy Piazza
1972	Black Kangaroo	Peter Kaukonen	Buck & Covington
1972	Long John Silver	Jefferson Airplane	Casady, J. Kaukonen, Piazza
1972	Filthy!	Papa John Creach	Casady, J. Kaukonen, Piazza
1973	Thirty Seconds Over Winterland	Jefferson Airplane	Casady, Creach, Kantner, J. Kaukonen
1973	Baron von Tollbooth & the Chrome Nun	Paul Kantner, Grace Slick & David Freiberg	Casady, Creach, Kantner, J. Kaukonen
1974	Manhole	Grace Slick	Casady, P. Kaukonen, Sears
1974	Quah	Jorma Kaukonen	Casady
1979	Jorma	Jorma Kaukonen	Bob Steeler
1980	Blue Star	Nick Gravenites	Covington, Greg Douglass, Sears
1980	Extended Play	SVT	Buck, Casady
1981	Barbeque King	Jorma Kaukonen & Vital Parts	Michael Falzarano
1983	Planet Earth Rock and Roll Orchestra	Paul Kantner	Casady, Sears
1986	KBC Band	KBC Band	Balin, Casady, Kantner
1989	Jefferson Airplane	Jefferson Airplane	Balin, Casady, Kantner, J. Kaukonen, P. Kaukonen
1989	Transverse City	Warren Zevon	Casady, J. Kaukonen
1994	Embryonic Journey	Jorma Kaukonen	Falzarano
1995	Deep Space/Virgin Sky	Jefferson Starship	Balin, Casady, Kantner
1995	Magic Two	Jorma Kaukonen	Falzarano
1995	The Land of Heroes	Jorma Kaukonen	Falzarano
1996	Christmas	Jorma Kaukonen	Falzarano
1996	Mecca	The Memphis Pilgrims	Falzarano, J. Kaukonen, Sears, Harvey Sorgen
1998	Too Many Years	Jorma Kaukonen	Falazarano, Sears
1998	Rusted Root	Rusted Root	Casady, Falzarano, J. Kaukonen, Sears, Sorgen
1999	Windows of Heaven	Jefferson Starship	Balin, Casady, Kantner
1999	Greatest Hits: Live at the Fillmore	Jefferson Starship	Balin, Casady, Kantner
1999	Love Will See You Through	Phil Lesh and Friends	J. Kaukonen, Sears
2000	Sharin' in the Groove: Celebrating the Music of Phish	Various artists	Casady, J. Kaukonen
2001	Jorma Kaukonen Trio Live	Jorma Kaukonen	Falzarano, Sears
2001	The Long Haul	Pete Sears	Casady, Falzarano, J. Kaukonen
2002	Moonlight Mile	Mark Isham	Casady, J. Kaukonen
2003	Dream Factor	Jack Casady	J. Kaukonen
2006	The King James Sessions	Michael Falzarano	J. Kaukonen, Sears
2007	Stars in My Crown	Jorma Kaukonen	Barry Mitterhoff
2008	We Are All One	Michael Falzarano	J. Kaukonen, Sears, Sorgen
2009	River of Time	Jorma Kaukonen	Larry Campbell, Justin Guip, Mitterhoff, Teresa Williams
2009	Moonalice	Moonalice	Casady, Sears
2010	Hippie Uprising	Various artists	Douglass, Sears
2013	Love for Levon	Various artists	Campbell, Guip, J. Kaukonen, Mitterhoff
2014	I Got Blues for Ya	Michael Falzarano	Mitterhoff, Sears
2015	Ain't In No Hurry	Jorma Kaukonen	Campbell, Casady, Falzarano, Guip, Mitterhoff, Williams
2015	Vignettes	Skoota Warner	Casady, J. Kaukonen
2018	Ace of Cups	The Ace of Cups	Casady, J. Kaukonen
2020	A Kaleidoscope Christmas	Michael Falzarano	Casady, J. Kaukonen, Sears
