= The Best of Hot Tuna =

Greatest hits album by Hot Tuna
- Released: July 28, 1998
- Label: RCA
- Producer: Paul Williams; Bill Thompson

Hot Tuna chronology
Live in Japan (1997)	The Best of Hot Tuna (1998)	And Furthurmore... (1999)

Professional ratings
Review scores
Source	Rating
AllMusic	4.5/5 stars

The Best of Hot Tuna is a Hot Tuna compilation album released in 1998. It covers songs from all the Hot Tuna albums released on Grunt Records. Bill Thompson, former manager of Jefferson Airplane and Hot Tuna helped select the songs for inclusion. The artwork on the cover is a painting of Jorma Kaukonen and Jack Casady made by Grace Slick. The album was released as a double CD.

== Track listing ==
=== Disc one ===
1. "Hesitation Blues" (Traditional) (from Hot Tuna) – 5:05
2. "Know You Rider" (Traditional) (from Hot Tuna) – 4:07
3. "Winin' Boy Blues" (Jelly Roll Morton) (from Hot Tuna) – 5:31
4. "Mann's Fate" (Jorma Kaukonen) (from Hot Tuna) – 5:20
5. "Keep Your Lamps Trimmed and Burning" (Rev. Gary Davis) (from First Pull Up, Then Pull Down) – 8:15
6. "Candy Man" (Davis) (from First Pull Up, Then Pull Down) – 5:48
7. "Been So Long" (Kaukonen) (Studio Version) (from "Been So Long" single) – 3:45
8. "Keep On Truckin'" (B. Carleton) (from Burgers) – 3:40
9. "99 Year Blues" (Julius Daniels) (from Burgers) – 3:57
10. "Ode for Billy Dean" (Kaukonen) (from Burgers) – 4:50
11. "Sea Child" (Kaukonen) (from Burgers) – 5:00
12. "Water Song" (Kaukonen) (from Burgers) – 5:15
13. "I See the Light" (Kaukonen) (from The Phosphorescent Rat) – 4:15
14. "Living Just for You" (Kaukonen) (from The Phosphorescent Rat) – 3:18
15. "Easy Now" (Kaukonen) (from The Phosphorescent Rat) – 5:10
16. "Sally Where'd You Get Your Liquor From" (Davis) (from The Phosphorescent Rat) – 2:56

=== Disc two ===
1. "Hit Single #1" (Kaukonen) (from America's Choice) – 5:13
2. "Serpent of Dreams" (Kaukonen) (from America's Choice) – 6:51
3. "Sleep Song" (Kaukonen) (from America's Choice) – 4:23
4. "Funky #7" (Jack Casady, Kaukonen) (from America's Choice) – 5:47
5. "Hot Jelly Roll Blues" (Bo Carter) (from Yellow Fever) – 4:21
6. "Sunrise Dance with the Devil" (Kaukonen) (from Yellow Fever) – 4:28
7. "Bar Room Crystal Ball" (Kaukonen) (from Yellow Fever) – 6:52
8. "I Wish You Would" (Billy Boy Arnold) (from Hoppkorv) – 3:10
9. "Watch the North Wind Rise" (Kaukonen) (from Hoppkorv) – 4:39
10. "It's So Easy" (Buddy Holly, Norman Petty) (from Hoppkorv) – 2:35
11. "Song from the Stainless Cymbal" (Kaukonen) (from Hoppkorv) – 4:02
12. "Genesis" (Kaukonen) (from Double Dose) – 4:27
13. "Rock Me Baby" (Joe Josea, B. B. King) (previously unreleased) – 7:36
14. "Extrication Love Song" (Kaukonen) (from Double Dose) – 5:20

== Personnel ==
- Jorma Kaukonen – guitars, vocals
- Jack Casady – bass
- Will Scarlett – harmonica
- Sammy Piazza – drums
- Papa John Creach – violin
- Bob Steeler – drums
- Nick Buck – synthesizer

=== Production ===
- Paul Williams – producer, compilation, tape research
- Bill Thompson – compilation, assistant
- Ray Loughren – assistant, sequencer
- Jim Cooperman – assistant
- Brian Mayer – assistant
- Bill Lacey – audio restoration
- Mike Harty – digital transfer
- Michael Drexler – digital transfer
- Dalita Keumurian – project director
- Dave Cohen – essay
- Tori Larkey – vault research
- Jack Rovner – creative director
- Henry Marquez – art direction
- Grace Slick – illustrations
- Mike Diehl – design
