= Final Vinyl (Hot Tuna album) =

Greatest hits album by Hot Tuna
- Released: March 29, 1979
- Length: 43:55
- Label: Grunt

Hot Tuna chronology
Double Dose (1978)	Final Vinyl (1979)	Splashdown (1984)

Final Vinyl is a Hot Tuna compilation album. At the time the album was assembled, Jorma Kaukonen and Jack Casady had stopped performing together and were on to newer endeavours. Kaukonen recorded a solo album, Jorma, and Casady joined the band SVT. Kaukonen signed to RCA Records and Casady moved to 415 Records. This marked the end of Hot Tuna on the Jefferson Airplane owned Grunt Records, so a "final" compilation album was assembled. Kaukonen and Casady reunited to perform as Hot Tuna in 1983 and moved to the Relix Records label, where they released material until the late 1990s.

== Critical reception ==
Professional ratings
Review scores
Source	Rating
AllMusic	3/5 stars

On AllMusic, Lindsay Planer wrote, "Issued in 1979, Final Vinyl gathers ten tracks from Hot Tuna's first eight LPs. While the tune stack is packed with enthusiast favorites, there are notable omissions and even a few questionable inclusions... Inclined parties are best served by the two-CD Best of Hot Tuna (1998), which contains a much broader and more accurate collection from the same era."

== Track listing ==
Side one
No.	Title	Writer(s)	Length
1.	"Hesitation Blues" (from Hot Tuna)	traditional, arranged by Jorma Kaukonen, Jack Casady	5:05
2.	"Candy Man" (single version B-side RCA #0528, from First Pull Up, Then Pull Down)	Reverend Gary Davis	3:59
3.	"Keep on Truckin'" (from Burgers)	Bob Carleton	3:40
4.	"Water Song" (from Burgers)	Kaukonen	5:15
5.	"Day to Day Out the Window Blues" (from The Phosphorescent Rat)	Kaukonen	3:25

Side two
No.	Title	Writer(s)	Length
1.	"Easy Now" (from The Phosphorescent Rat)	Kaukonen	5:10
2.	"Funky #7" (from America's Choice)	Casady, Kaukonen	5:47
3.	"Hot Jelly Roll Blues" (single version A-side Grunt #10443, from Yellow Fever)	George Carter	3:08
4.	"Song from the Stainless Cymbal" (from Hoppkorv)	Kaukonen	3:58
5.	"I Wish You Would" (from Double Dose)	Billy Boy Arnold	4:28

== Personnel ==
- Jorma Kaukonen – guitars, vocals
- Jack Casady – bass
- Will Scarlett – harmonica on "Hesitation Blues" and "Candy Man"
- Sammy Piazza – drums on "Candy Man", "Keep On Truckin'", "Water Song", "Day to Day Out the Window Blues" and "Easy Now"
- Papa John Creach – violin on "Candy Man", "Keep On Truckin'" and "Water Song"
- Nick Buck – keyboards on "Keep On Truckin'", "Water Song" and "I Wish You Would"
- Bob Steeler – drums on "Funky #7", "Hot Jelly Roll Blues", "Song from the Stainless Cymbal" and "I Wish You Would"

=== Production ===
- Pat Ieraci (Maurice) – production coordinator
- Bill Thompson – manager
- Tim Bryant / Gribbitt – art direction
- Tim Bryant & George Corsillo / Gribbitt – design
- Jacky Kaukonen and Pat Ieraci (Maurice) – album title
- Mastered by John Golden, Kendun Recorders, Burbank
- Roger Ressmeyer – photography
