= Flight Log =

Flight Log (1966–1976)

Greatest hits album by Jefferson Airplane
- Released: January 7, 1977
- Studio: Various
- Genre: Folk rock, psychedelic rock
- Length: 85:06
- Label: Grunt/RCA Records

Jefferson Airplane chronology
Early Flight (1974)	Flight Log (1966–1976) (1977)	2400 Fulton Street (1987)

Jefferson Starship chronology
Spitfire (1976)	Flight Log (1977)	Earth (1978)

Hot Tuna chronology
Hoppkorv (1976)	Flight Log (1977)	Double Dose (1978)

Alternative cover
- Japanese re-release

Professional ratings
Review scores
Source	Rating
AllMusic	3/5 stars
Robert Christgau	C+
The Encyclopedia of Popular Music	4/5 stars

Flight Log (1966–1976) is a compilation album by the American rock band Jefferson Airplane. Released in January 1977 as a double-LP as Grunt CYL2-1255, it is a compilation of Jefferson Airplane and Airplane-related tracks, including tracks by Jefferson Starship and Hot Tuna, as well as solo tracks by Paul Kantner, Grace Slick, and Jorma Kaukonen. Although primarily a compilation album, the album includes one previously unreleased song: "Please Come Back" written by Ron Nagle and performed by Jefferson Starship. "Please Come Back" is not available on any other release.

Among the guest musicians featured on the album are David Crosby of Crosby, Stills, Nash & Young on one track and Jerry Garcia of the Grateful Dead on three, two of which also feature Mickey Hart.

The album included a lavish 12-page full-color, full-size (12 sq.in.) booklet, containing photographs of the band throughout the period covered by the compilation. It also contained a detailed history of the band, written by Patrick Snyder of Rolling Stone magazine.

Flight Log was first reissued on CD by BMG Japan on October 22, 2008, as a part of the "Paper Sleeve Collection" reissue series (BVCM-35468-9). The release features an exact reproduction of the Grunt 1977 edition of the LP packaging including a reduced scale reproduction of the original booklet and inner sleeve jackets for the CDs. Also included is a second booklet containing all the lyrics in both English and Japanese. The only omission by BMG Japan was not reproducing the original GRUNT label on the CDs. The audio quality is as good as the original master tapes available for the Japanese LP pressing and features JVC K2 24 Bit Remastering. However, it sounds as if the master tapes had been damaged on at least three songs, and significantly obvious on the introduction of "Silver Spoon". CD 1 contains Side A and B, and CD 2 contains Side C and D.

On April 5, 2011, BGO Records released a remastered edition of Flight Log in a standard jewel case with cardboard slip cover. The BGO version is said to be a sonic improvement on the BMG/Sony edition; nonetheless, certain tape defects such as on Silver Spoon still exist.

== Track listing (with artist) ==
Side A
No.	Title	Writer(s)	Artist	Length
1.	"Come Up the Years" (from Jefferson Airplane Takes Off)	Marty Balin, Paul Kantner	Jefferson Airplane	2:30
2.	"White Rabbit" (from Surrealistic Pillow)	Grace Slick	Jefferson Airplane	2:27
3.	"Comin' Back to Me" (from Surrealistic Pillow)	Balin	Jefferson Airplane	5:15
4.	"Won't You Try / Saturday Afternoon" (from After Bathing at Baxter's)	Kantner	Jefferson Airplane	5:02
5.	"Greasy Heart" (from Crown of Creation)	Slick	Jefferson Airplane	3:25
6.	"If You Feel" (from Crown of Creation)	Balin, Gary Blackman	Jefferson Airplane	3:30

Side B
No.	Title	Writer(s)	Artist	Length
1.	"Somebody to Love" (live, from Bless Its Pointed Little Head)	Darby Slick	Jefferson Airplane	3:46
2.	"Wooden Ships" (from Volunteers)	David Crosby, Kantner, Stephen Stills	Jefferson Airplane	6:00
3.	"Volunteers" (from Volunteers)	Balin, Kantner	Jefferson Airplane	2:03
4.	"Hesitation Blues" (from Hot Tuna)	traditional, arranged by Jorma Kaukonen, Jack Casady	Hot Tuna	5:05
5.	"Have You Seen the Stars Tonite?" (from Blows Against the Empire)	Crosby, Kantner	Paul Kantner, Jefferson Starship	3:42

Side C
No.	Title	Writer(s)	Artist	Length
1.	"Silver Spoon" (from Sunfighter)	Slick	Paul Kantner, Grace Slick	5:40
2.	"Feel So Good" (from Bark)	Kaukonen	Jefferson Airplane	4:35
3.	"Pretty as You Feel" (single version A-side Grunt #65-0500, from Bark)	Joey Covington, Casady, Kaukonen	Jefferson Airplane	3:07
4.	"Milk Train" (from Long John Silver)	Slick, Papa John Creach, Roger Spotts	Jefferson Airplane	3:26
5.	"Ja Da (Keep on Truckin')" (from Burgers)	Bob Carleton	Hot Tuna	3:40

Side D
No.	Title	Writer(s)	Artist	Length
1.	"¿Come Again Toucan?" (from Manhole)	David Freiberg, Slick	Grace Slick	3:13
2.	"Sketches of China" (from Baron von Tollbooth & the Chrome Nun)	Kantner, Slick	Paul Kantner, Grace Slick, David Freiberg	5:13
3.	"Genesis" (from Quah)	Kaukonen	Jorma Kaukonen	4:19
4.	"Ride the Tiger" (from Dragon Fly)	Kantner, Slick, Byong Yu	Grace Slick, Paul Kantner, Jefferson Starship	5:06
5.	"Please Come Back" (live)	Ron Nagle	Jefferson Starship	4:02

== Personnel ==
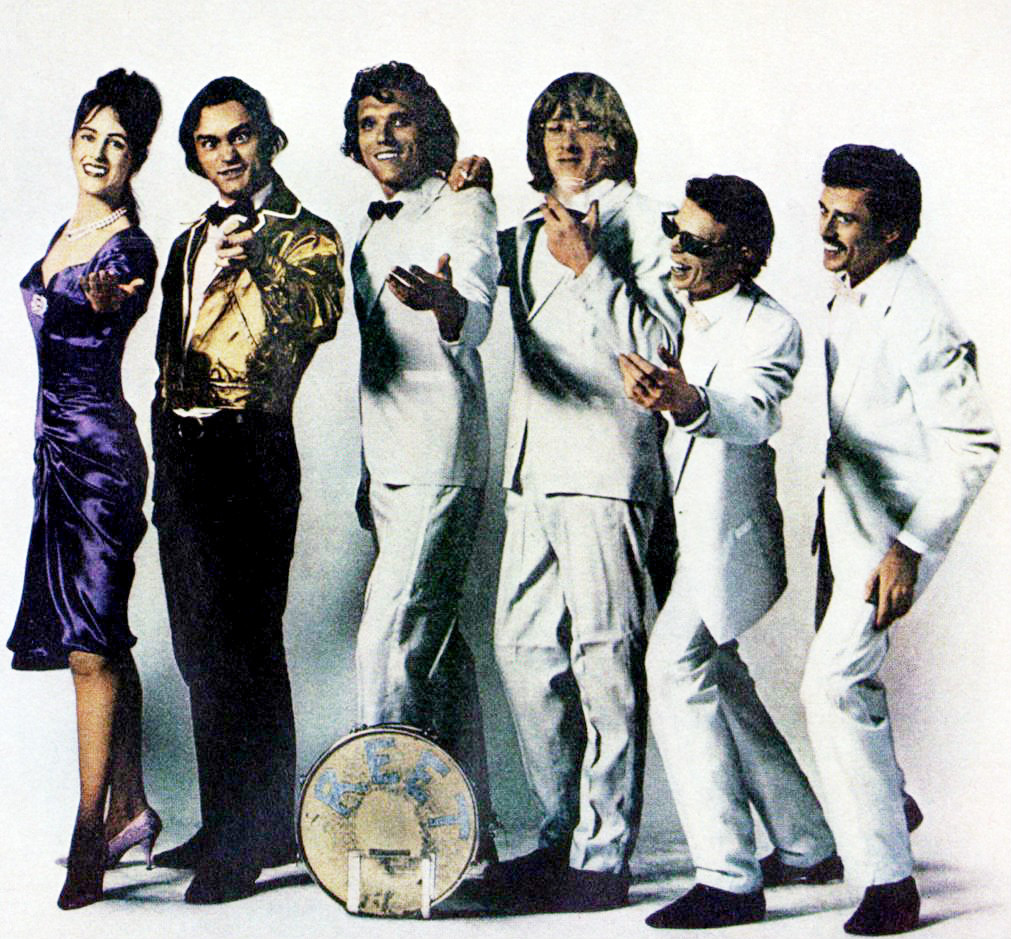
Photo for Flight Log album ad, 1977. From left: Grace Slick, Marty Balin, Jorma Kaukonen, Paul Kantner, Jack Casady, Spencer Dryden.

- Signe Anderson – vocals
- Marty Balin – vocals
- Skip Spence – drums
- Paul Kantner – vocals, rhythm guitar
- Jorma Kaukonen – lead guitar, acoustic guitar, vocals
- Jack Casady – bass
- Grace Slick – vocals, piano
- Spencer Dryden – drums
- Jerry Garcia – guitar, pedal steel guitar, lead guitar
- Nicky Hopkins – piano
- Will Scarlett – harmonica
- David Crosby – vocals, guitar
- Mickey Hart – percussion, gongs
- Joey Covington – drums, vocals
- Papa John Creach – violin
- John Barbata – drums
- Sammy Piazza – drums
- Nick Buck – piano
- David Freiberg – vocals, keyboards, bass, rhythm guitar
- Craig Chaquico – lead guitar
- Jack Traylor – vocals
- Chris Ethridge – bass
- Tom Hobson – guitar
- Pete Sears – bass, rhythm guitar

Three of the tracks have contributions from members of the Grateful Dead.

=== Production ===
- Bill Thompson – manager
- Jacky Kaukonen – secretary
- Bill Laudner – road manager
- Pat Ieraci (Maurice) – production coordinator, album coordinator
- Paul Dowell – equipment manager
- Roger Ressmeyer, Tony Lane, Jim Marshall, Dave Patrick, B. Beckhard, Jim Smircich, Charles Stewart, Randy Tuten – photography
- Mastered by John Golden, Kendun Recorders, Burbank
- Craig DeCamps – booklet design
- Acy R. Lehman – cover and art direction
- Takuya Matsuyama – product director for Japanese release
- Asami Konno – creative coordinator for Japanese release
- Kazuhisa Fujita – design for Japanese release
- STRANGE DAYS – support for Japanese release

== Charts ==
Chart (1977)	Peak position
US Billboard 200	37

== Certifications ==
Region	Certification	Certified units/sales
United States (RIAA)	Gold	500,000^{^}
^{^} Shipments figures based on certification alone.
