= Wally Heider Studios =

Recording studio in San Francisco, CA

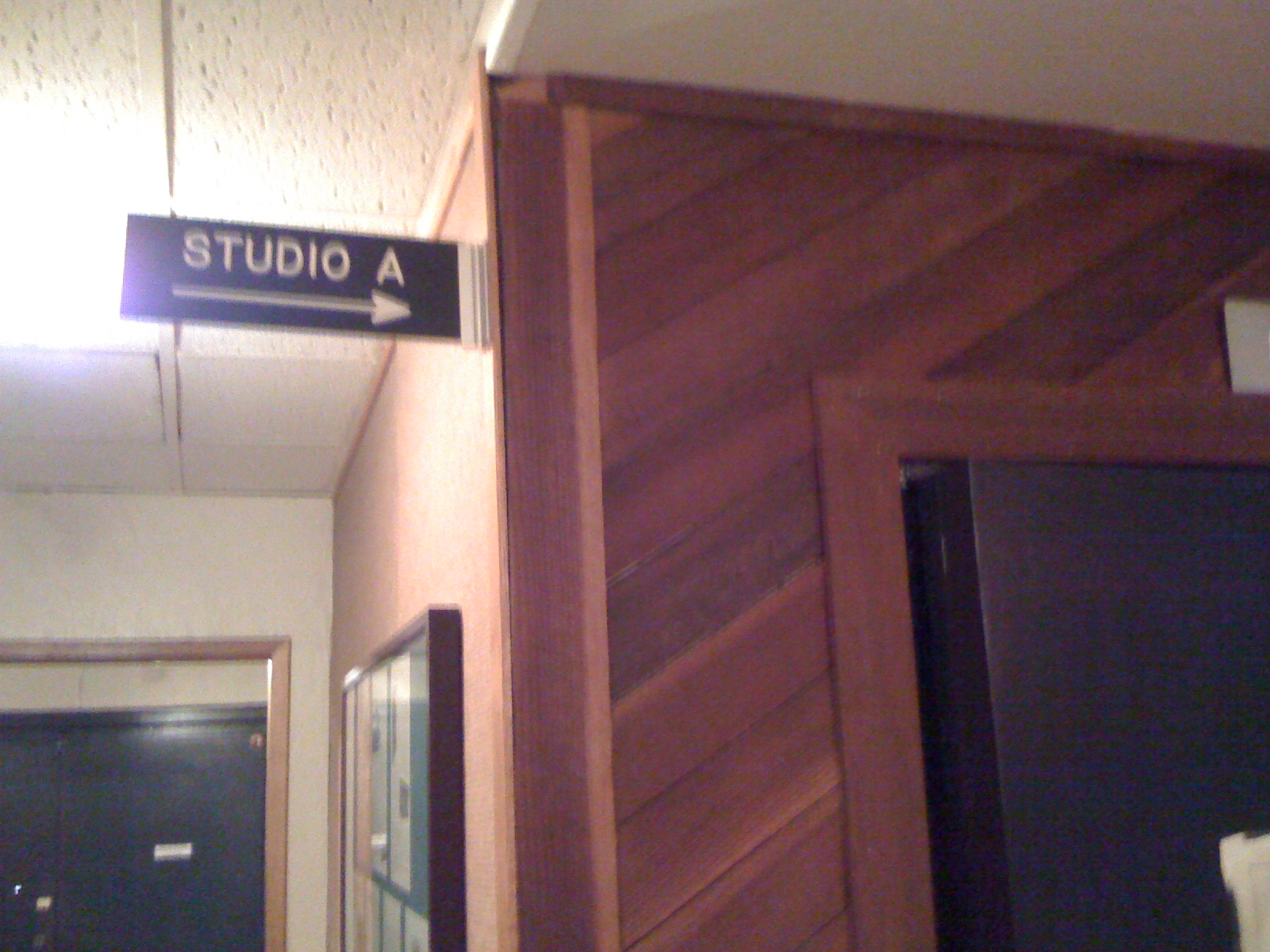
- Studio A, Hyde Street Studios (formerly Wally Heider Studios)
- Industry: Recording studio
- Founded: United States (1969) (1960s)
- Founder: Wally Heider
- Defunct: 1980
- Successor: Hyde Street Studios
- Headquarters: San Francisco, United States

Wally Heider Studios was a recording studio founded in San Francisco in 1969 by recording engineer and studio owner Wally Heider. Between 1969 and 1980, numerous notable artists recorded at the studios, including Creedence Clearwater Revival, Jefferson Airplane, Crosby, Stills, Nash & Young, and the Grateful Dead. The studio changed ownership in 1980 and was renamed Hyde Street Studios, which is still in operation today.

== History ==
=== Background ===
Wally Heider had apprenticed with as an engineer and mixer at Bill Putnam's United Western Recorders studio complex in Hollywood in the early 1960s, after which he founded Wally Heider Recording with the opening of Studio 3 at 1604 N. Cahuenga Boulevard in Hollywood. Heider and his crew garnered a high reputation for top notch engineering that resulted in excellent studio and remote location recordings, including sessions with the Beach Boys and Crosby, Stills & Nash.

In 1967, Heider assisted in the live recording of the Monterey Pop Festival. Artists from the Bay Area such as Jefferson Airplane, Quicksilver Messenger Service and the Grateful Dead had been recording in Los Angeles and New York, and Heider saw the need for musicians involved in the nascent San Francisco sound to have their own well-equipped and staffed recording studio close to home.

=== Hyde Street ===
In March 1969, Heider opened Wally Heider Studios at 245 Hyde Street, San Francisco, between Turk and Eddy Streets, across the street from the Black Hawk jazz club, in a building that had previously been used by 20th Century Fox for film offices, screening rooms and storage. The studios were built by Dave Mancini.

Heider planned four studios—A and B on the ground floor and C and D upstairs. However, studio B was never finished and instead became a game room. The studio commenced operations in May 1969 upon completion of Studio C, with staff that included General Manager Mel Tanner, Booking Agent Ginger Mews, Technician Harry Sitam, and Staff Engineer Russ Gary. Studio C's dimensions were similar to Heider's Studio 3 in Hollywood—though its control room, instead of being at the end the room, was parallel to Studio C's long side. The walls were kept from being parallel with square gypsum devices that were used as mid-range sound diffusers and absorbers. At the Grateful Dead's request, its studio doors were covered with airbrushed paintings. Studios A and D became operational a few months later.

Frank DeMedio, who had designed the 24-channel mixing console and an 8-channel monitor and cue—replicated for Heider's Studio 3 and remote truck in Hollywood, built all of the custom equipment and mixing console for Heider's new Hyde Street studios, using Universal Audio (UA) console components, military grade switches and level controls, and a simple audio path that used one preamp for everything in a channel. Monitor speakers were Altec 604-Es with McIntosh 275 tube power amps.

The first release out of Studio C was Jefferson Airplane's Volunteers (1969), which was also the first album they recorded in their hometown. Between 1969 and 1970, many other high-profile acts followed, including Harry Nilsson, Crosby, Stills, Nash & Young (CSNY), the Steve Miller Band. Creedence Clearwater Revival (CCR) recorded several albums in that room, and named their record Cosmo's Factory (1970) after the "factory" at Studio C (Cosmo's Factory was CCR's rehearsal area). Engineers and staff at the studio during that time included Bill Halverson, Stephen Barncard, and Glyn Johns.

While CSNY were recording, Studio D – an exact replica of Heider's Studio 3 in Hollywood – opened. Among the first things to be recorded in Studio D was Jerry Garcia's pedal steel guitar overdub for "Teach Your Children", while the live recording setup was kept intact in Studio C where CSNY recorded. In that same period, Deane Jensen supervised installation of a new Quad Eight console in Studio A. Santana and John Hall used Studio D a few times. CBS Records had a priority lease on Studio D for a year, before eventually taking over Coast Recorders as their west coast recording facility. Many other artists followed.

In 1978, Heider sold the studio and its name to Filmways, but remained as manager until 1980 when Filmways sold it to a partnership composed of Dan Alexander, Tom Sharples, and Michael Ward. The three partners renamed the business Hyde Street Studios, which is still an operating recording studio as of 2019, now owned solely by Michael Ward.

== Albums recorded ==
1969

- Volunteers – Jefferson Airplane
- Green River – Creedence Clearwater Revival
- Shady Grove – Quicksilver Messenger Service
- Zephyr – Zephyr
- Neil Young – Neil Young
- Everybody Knows This Is Nowhere – Neil Young with Crazy Horse

1970

- Déjà Vu – Crosby, Stills, Nash & Young
- Eric Burdon Declares "War" – Eric Burdon and War
- Abraxas – Santana
- Blows Against the Empire – Paul Kantner
- American Beauty – The Grateful Dead
- Portrait – The 5th Dimension
- The Black-Man's Burdon – Eric Burdon and War
- Cosmo's Factory – Creedence Clearwater Revival
- Tarkio – Brewer & Shipley
- Pendulum – Creedence Clearwater Revival
- The Original Human Being – Blue Cheer

1971

- Bark – Jefferson Airplane
- Sunfighter – Paul Kantner and Grace Slick
- Chilliwack – Chilliwack
- Electric Warrior – T. Rex
- If I Could Only Remember My Name – David Crosby
- Songs for Beginners – Graham Nash
- Tupelo Honey – Van Morrison
- Shake Off the Demon – Brewer & Shipley
- Guilty! – Eric Burdon and Jimmy Witherspoon
- Grin – Grin
- Papa John Creach – Papa John Creach
- Moments – Boz Scaggs
- Endless Boogie – John Lee Hooker
- Mwandishi – Herbie Hancock
- New Riders of the Purple Sage – New Riders of the Purple Sage

1972

- Graham Nash David Crosby – Crosby & Nash
- Long John Silver – Jefferson Airplane
- Burgers – Hot Tuna
- First Taste of Sin – Cold Blood
- 1+1 – Grin
- Rural Space – Brewer & Shipley
- Come by 1
- Saint Dominic's Preview – Van Morrison
- Toulouse Street – The Doobie Brothers
- Garcia – Jerry Garcia
- Ace – Bob Weir
- Rowan Brothers – Rowan Brothers
- Livin' the Life – Chris and Lorin Rowan
- You're Not Elected, Charlie Brown – Vince Guaraldi Quintet (television soundtrack)

1973

- Byrds – The Byrds
- Head Hunters – Herbie Hancock
- Baron von Tollbooth & The Chrome Nun – Paul Kantner, Grace Slick and David Freiberg
- Child of Nature – Jack Traylor and Steelwind
- Full Sail – Loggins and Messina
- How Time Flys – David Ossman and The Firesign Theatre
- GP – Gram Parsons
- Deliver the Word – War
- Be What You Want To – Link Wray
- Betty Davis – Betty Davis
- Sextant – Herbie Hancock
- Roger McGuinn – Roger McGuinn
- There's No Time for Love, Charlie Brown – Vince Guaraldi Quintet (television soundtrack)
- A Charlie Brown Thanksgiving – Vince Guaraldi Quintet (television soundtrack)

1974

- Grievous Angel – Gram Parsons
- Manhole – Grace Slick
- The Phosphorescent Rat – Hot Tuna
- Early Flight – Jefferson Airplane
- Dragon Fly – Grace Slick, Paul Kantner and Jefferson Starship
- Quah – Jorma Kaukonen
- What Were Once Vices Are Now Habits – The Doobie Brothers
- ST11621 – Brewer & Shipley
- Look at the Fool – Tim Buckley
- The Heart of Saturday Night – Tom Waits
- Southern Comfort – The Crusaders
- Peace on You – Roger McGuinn
- No Other – Gene Clark
- It's a Mystery, Charlie Brown – Vince Guaraldi Quartet (television soundtrack)
- It's the Easter Beagle, Charlie Brown – Vince Guaraldi Quartet (television soundtrack)

1975

- Survival of the Fittest – The Headhunters
- America's Choice – Hot Tuna
- Red Octopus – Jefferson Starship
- Yellow Fever – Hot Tuna
- The Tubes – The Tubes
- Tale Spinnin' – Weather Report
- Chain Reaction – The Crusaders
- Adventures in Paradise – Minnie Riperton
- Atlantic Crossing – Rod Stewart
- Song for America – Kansas
- Saturday Night Special – Norman Connors
- Steppin' – Pointer Sisters
- Venus and Mars – Wings
- Coke – Coke Escovedo
- Angel – Angel
- Tell Me The Truth – Jon Hendricks
- An Evening with John Denver – John Denver (recorded live at Universal Amphitheater)
- Be My Valentine, Charlie Brown – Vince Guaraldi Trio (television soundtrack)
- You're a Good Sport, Charlie Brown – Vince Guaraldi Trio (television soundtrack)

1976

- It's Arbor Day, Charlie Brown – Vince Guaraldi Trio (television soundtrack)
- Spitfire – Jefferson Starship
- Heritage – Eddie Henderson
- Hoppkorv – Hot Tuna
- Amigos – Santana
- Small Change – Tom Waits
- Salongo – Ramsey Lewis
- Alessi – Alessi Brothers
- Legs Diamond – Legs Diamond

1977

- Rumours – Fleetwood Mac
- Thunderbyrd – Roger McGuinn
- Conquistador – Maynard Ferguson
- American Stars 'n Bars – Neil Young
- Having a Party – Pointer Sisters
- Donald Clark Osmond – Donny Osmond

1978

- Earth – Jefferson Starship
- Double Dose – Hot Tuna
- Do It All Night – Curtis Mayfield
- Comes a Time – Neil Young
- Jass-Ay-Lay-Dee – Ohio Players
- Streamline – Lenny White
- Twin Sons of Different Mothers – Dan Fogelberg and Tim Weisberg

1979

- Jorma – Jorma Kaukonen
- Connections and Disconnections – Funkadelic

1981

- Law and Order – Lindsey Buckingham

1982

- One from the Heart – Tom Waits and Crystal Gayle
- Right Back At Cha! – Dynasty
- Long After Dark – Tom Petty and the Heartbreakers
