= True Religion (disambiguation) =

True Religion is an American clothing company. It may also refer to:

- One true faith or religious exclusivism
- "True Religion", a song by Hot Tuna from the album Burgers
- "True Religion", a 2025 song by Shygirl from the extended play Club Shy Room 2

== See also ==
- Of True Religion, a 1673 polemical tract by John Milton
