= Grunt Records =

- Parent company: Jefferson Airplane, Inc.
- Founded: 1971
- Founder: Jefferson Airplane
- Distributor: RCA Records
- Genre: Rock; Psychedelic rock
- Country of origin: United States

Grunt Records was a vanity label founded in 1971 by Jefferson Airplane and distributed by RCA Records. Initially created to sign local Bay Area acts, the label later was used only for Jefferson Starship and Hot Tuna releases. The label ended use in 1987 after Grace Slick left Starship.

== History ==
Grunt Records was formed in 1970 when Jefferson Airplane renegotiated their contract with RCA Records. Initially, Paul Kantner, Grace Slick, Jorma Kaukonen, Jack Casady, and Bill Thompson were responsible for managing. The name was inspired by a working title for the Volunteers album, "Squat on My Grunt." The first artists signed to the label were Jefferson Airplane, Hot Tuna, Peter Kaukonen, Jack Bonus, Papa John Creach, 1, and Richmond Talbott.

Thompson took over management of Grunt in 1973 and signed former Airplane drummer Joey Covington and Jack Traylor to the label. In 1974, RCA dropped all Grunt artists except for Jefferson Starship and Hot Tuna. Jorma Kaukonen signed to a solo deal with RCA in 1979, and Hot Tuna released Final Vinyl. Jefferson Starship and Starship used the label until Grace Slick left the band and joined Jefferson Airplane for a reunion tour and album on Epic Records.

To promote the label, Greg Irons and Tom Veitch wrote two issues of a comic book called Grunt Comix.

== Discography ==
=== Albums ===
- FTR-1001 Bark by Jefferson Airplane
- FTR-1002 Sunfighter by Paul Kantner and Grace Slick
- FTR-1003 Papa John Creach by Papa John Creach
- FTR-1004 Burgers by Hot Tuna
- FTR-1005 Jack Bonus by Jack Bonus
- FTR-1006 Black Kangaroo by Peter Kaukonen
- FTR-1007 Long John Silver by Jefferson Airplane
- FTR-1008 Come by 1
- FTR-1009 Filthy! by Papa John Creach
- BFL1-0147 Thirty Seconds Over Winterland by Jefferson Airplane
- BFL1-0148 Baron von Tollbooth and the Chrome Nun by Paul Kantner, Grace Slick, and David Freiberg
- BFL1-0149 Fat Fandango by Joe E. Covington
- BFL1-0194 Child of Nature by Jack Traylor and Steelwind
- BFL1-0209 Quah by Jorma Kaukonen
- BFL1-0347 Manhole by Grace Slick
- BFL1-0348 The Phosphorescent Rat by Hot Tuna
- BFL1-0418 Playing My Fiddle for You by Papa John Creach
- CYL1-0437 Early Flight by Jefferson Airplane
- BFL1-0717 Dragon Fly by Grace Slick, Paul Kantner, and Jefferson Starship
- BFL1-0820 America's Choice by Hot Tuna
- BFL1-0999 Red Octopus by Jefferson Starship
- BFL1-1238 Yellow Fever by Hot Tuna
- CYL2-1255 Flight Log by Jefferson Airplane
- BFL1-1557 Spitfire by Jefferson Starship
- BFL1-1920 Hoppkorv by Hot Tuna
- BXL1-2515 Earth by Jefferson Starship
- CYL2-2545 Double Dose by Hot Tuna
- DJL1-2852 The Last Interview? by Hot Tuna
- BZL1-3247 Gold by Jefferson Starship
- BXL1-3357 Final Vinyl by Hot Tuna
- BZL1-3452 Freedom at Point Zero by Jefferson Starship
- BZL1-3848 Modern Times by Jefferson Starship
- BXL1-4372 Winds of Change by Jefferson Starship
- BXL1-4921 Nuclear Furniture by Jefferson Starship
- BXL1-5488 Knee Deep in the Hoopla by Starship
- 6413-G No Protection by Starship
- 9693-R Love Among the Cannibals by Starship (non-Grunt; RCA-only release)
- 2423-R Greatest Hits (Ten Years and Change 1979–1991) by Starship (non-Grunt; RCA-only release)

==== Reissues ====
- BXL1-2591 Reissue of Burgers by Hot Tuna
- CYL1-3363 Picture Disc Reissue of Gold by Jefferson Starship
- AYL1-3660 Reissue of Red Octopus by Jefferson Starship
- AYL1-3747 Reissue of Quah by Jorma Kaukonen
- AYL1-3796 Reissue of Dragon Fly by Grace Slick, Paul Kantner, and Jefferson Starship
- AYL1-3799 Reissue of Baron von Tollbooth and the Chrome Nun by Paul Kantner, Grace Slick, and David Freiberg
- AYL1-3951 Reissue of Burgers by Hot Tuna
- AYL1-3953 Reissue of Spitfire by Jefferson Starship
- AYL1-4172 Reissue of Earth by Jefferson Starship
- AYL1-4385 Reissue of Sunfighter by Paul Kantner and Grace Slick
- AYL1-4386 Reissue of Bark by Jefferson Airplane
- AYL1-4391 Reissue of Thirty Seconds Over Winterland by Jefferson Airplane
- AYL1-5161 Reissue of Freedom at Point Zero by Jefferson Starship

==== Unissued ====
- FTR-1010 Gettin' Plenty by Richmond Talbott

=== Singles ===
1971

- 65-0500 – "Pretty as You Feel" / "Wild Turkey" – Jefferson Airplane
- 65-0501 – "The Janitor Drives a Cadillac" / "Over the Rainbow" – Papa John Creach
- 65-0502 – "Keep On Truckin'" / "Water Song" – Hot Tuna

1972

- 65-0503 – "Sunfighter" / "China" – Paul Kantner & Grace Slick
- 65-0504 – "Sweet Mahidabelle" / "St Louis Missouri Boy" – Jack Bonus
- 65-0505 – "Papa John's Down Home Blues" / "String Jet Rock" – Papa John Creach
- 65-0506 – "Long John Silver" / "Milk Train" – Jefferson Airplane
- 65-0507 – "Prisoner" / "Dynamo Snackbar" – Peter Kaukonen
- 65-0508 – "Filthy Funky, Part 1" / "Filthy Funky, Part 2" – Papa John Creach
- 65-0509 – "Free Rain" / "1 of a Kind" – 1
- 65-0510 – "Up or Down" / "That's a Good Question" – Peter Kaukonen
- 65-0511 – "Twilight Double Leader" / "Trial by Fire" – Jefferson Airplane

1973

- 65-0512 – "Moonbeam" / "A Hideout Is a Crook's Best Friend" –Joe E. Covington
- 00094 – "Sketches of China" / "Ballad of the Chrome Nun" – Kantner / Slick / Freiberg
- 0057 – "Time to Be Happy" / "Child of Nature" – Jack Traylor & Steelwind

1974

- 65-0183 – "Theme from Manhole" / "Come Again? Toucan" – Grace Slick
- 10080 – "Ride the Tiger" / "Devil's Den" – Grace Slick / Paul Kantner / Jefferson Starship

1975

- 10206 – "Caroline" / "Be Young You" – Grace Slick / Paul Kantner / Jefferson Starship
- 10367 – "Miracles" / "Al Garimasu (There Is Love)" – Jefferson Starship
- 10443 – "Hot Jelly Roll Blues" / "Surphase Tension" – Hot Tuna

1976

- 10456 – "Play on Love" / "I Want to See Another World" – Jefferson Starship
- 10746 – "With Your Love" / "Switchblade" – Jefferson Starship
- 10776 – "It's So Easy" / "I Can't Be Satisfied" – Hot Tuna
- 10791 – "St. Charles" / "Love Lovely Love" – Jefferson Starship

1977

- (none)

1978

- 11196 – "Count On Me" / "Show Yourself" – Jefferson Starship
- 11274 – "Runaway" / "Hot Water" – Jefferson Starship
- 11374 – "Crazy Feelin'" / "Love Too Good" – Jefferson Starship

1979

- 11426 – "Light the Sky on Fire" / "Hyperdrive" – Jefferson Starship

(Marty Balin departs, Mickey Thomas arrives)

- 11750 – "Jane" / "Freedom at Point Zero" – Jefferson Starship

1980

- 11921 – "Girl with the Hungry Eyes" / "Just the Same" – Jefferson Starship
- 11961 – "Rock Music" / "Lightning Rose" – Jefferson Starship

1981

- 12211 – "Find Your Way Back" / "Modern Times" – Jefferson Starship
- 12275 – "Stranger" / "Free" – Jefferson Starship
- 12332 – "Save Your Love" / "Wild Eyes" – Jefferson Starship

1982

- 13350 – "Be My Lady" / "Out of Control" – Jefferson Starship
- 13439 – "Winds of Change" / "Black Widow" – Jefferson Starship

1983

- 13531 – "Can't Find Love" / "I Will Stay" – Jefferson Starship

1984

- 13811 – "No Way Out" / "Rose Goes to Yale" – Jefferson Starship
- 13872 – "Layin' It on the Line" / "Showdown" – Jefferson Starship

1985

- 14170 – "We Built This City" / "Private Room" (instrumental) – Starship – (Grunt / RCA)
- 14253 – "Sara" / "Hearts of the World (Will Understand)" – Starship – (Grunt / RCA)

1986

- 14332 – "Tomorrow Doesn't Matter Tonight" / "Love Rusts" – Starship – (Grunt / RCA)
- 14393 – "Before I Go" / "Cut You Down to Size" – Starship – (Grunt / RCA)

1987

- 5109 – "Nothing's Gonna Stop Us Now" / "Layin' It on the Line" – Starship – (Grunt / RCA)
- 5225 – "It's Not Over ('til It's Over)" / "Babylon" – Starship – (Grunt / RCA)
- 5308 – "Beat Patrol" / "Girls Like You" – Starship – (Grunt / RCA)

1988

- 6964 – "Set the Night to Music" / "I Don't Know Why" – Starship – (Grunt / RCA)

1989

- 9032 – "It's Not Enough" / "Love Among the Cannibals" – Starship – (non-Grunt; RCA-only)

1990

- 9109 – "I Didn't Mean to Stay All Night" / "We Dream in Color" – Starship – (non-Grunt; RCA-only)
