= Fur Peace Ranch =

Performing arts center in Ohio, US

Coordinates: 39.1386°N 82.0053°W

Jorma Kaukonen's Fur Peace Ranch is located in Meigs County, Ohio, United States, near Pomeroy. The 126-acre ranch hosts weekend workshops for guitarists. Among the staff members are Larry Campbell, Warren Haynes, and Tommy Emmanuel. Concerts from the ranch are released on the radio show Live From Jorma Kaukonen's Fur Peace Ranch, on WOUB and PRX stations.
