= First Pull Up, Then Pull Down =

Live album by Hot Tuna
- Released: June 1971
- Recorded: April 1971 at Chateau Liberte, Los Gatos, California
- Genre: Blues rock
- Length: 43:27
- Label: RCA Victor
- Producer: Jorma Kaukonen

Hot Tuna chronology
Hot Tuna (1970)	First Pull Up, Then Pull Down (1971)	Burgers (1972)

Professional ratings
Review scores
Source	Rating
Allmusic	3/5 stars
Rolling Stone	(not rated)

First Pull Up, Then Pull Down is the second album by Hot Tuna, released in 1971 as RCA Victor LSP-4550. The album was recorded live with electric instruments, instead of the acoustic instruments used on the previous album, Hot Tuna. The album rose to No. 43 on the Billboard charts. In 1996, RCA released the CD box set Hot Tuna in a Can, which included a remastered version of this album, along with remasters of the albums Hot Tuna, Burgers, America's Choice and Hoppkorv. In Canada, the album reached No. 30 in the RPM Magazine charts where it was shown as Hot Tuna Electric Recorded Live.

== Track listing ==
Side one
No.	Title	Writer(s)	Length
1.	"John's Other" (instrumental)	Papa John Creach	8:12
2.	"Candy Man"	Rev. Gary Davis	5:44
3.	"Been So Long"	Jorma Kaukonen	3:42
4.	"Want You to Know"	Bo Carter	4:26

Side two
No.	Title	Writer(s)	Length
1.	"Keep Your Lamps Trimmed and Burning"	Davis	8:08
2.	"Never Happen No More"	Blind Blake	3:47
3.	"Come Back Baby"	traditional, arranged by Kaukonen	9:28

== Personnel ==
- Jack Casady – bass
- Jorma Kaukonen – vocals, guitar
- Papa John Creach – electric violin
- Sammy Piazza – drums

Additional personnel

- Will Scarlett – harmonica

=== Production ===
- Pat "Maurice" Ieraci – master of the machines
- Allen Zentz – engineer
- Margareta Kaukonen – drawings
- Mike Frankel – interior photograph
- Jack Casady – pin-up photo
- RCA – cage
- Recorded at the Chateau Liberté, 22700 Old Santa Cruz Highway, Los Gatos, CA (in the Santa Cruz Mountains)
- Mixed down at Wally Heider Studios, San Francisco
- A Fishobaby Production
