= Steady as She Goes (Hot Tuna album) =

Studio album by Hot Tuna
- Released: April 5, 2011
- Recorded: November–December 2010 at Levon Helm Studios, Woodstock, NY
- Genre: Blues rock
- Label: Red House
- Producer: Larry Campbell

Hot Tuna chronology
Live at New Orleans House: Berkeley, CA 09/69 (2010)	Steady as She Goes (2011)	Bear's Sonic Journals: Before We Were Them (2019)

Singles from Steady as She Goes
- 1. "Angel of Darkness" Released: March 11, 2011

Professional ratings
Review scores
Source	Rating
Allmusic	3/5 stars
Philadelphia Daily News	(A−)

Steady as She Goes is a 2011 album by Hot Tuna, the band's first studio album since 1990. After Jorma Kaukonen recorded his solo album in 2009 at Levon Helm's studio in NY, he asked his new record company Red House if they would be interested in a Tuna album. The band started recording new tracks in November 2010 with the same producer and studio that Kaukonen used for River of Time and features the latest lineup of the band that formed in 2009 when Skoota Warner joined on drums. On March 11, 2011, Red House released "Angel of Darkness" as a free single. The album was released on CD and on iTunes April 5, 2011 and was released on vinyl in May. The album first charted on the Tastemaker and Independent album lists compiled by Billboard for the week of April 23.

Released as "Collector's Edition: Half-speed Mastered 180 Gram HQ Vinyl" with only a few hundred made, in gatefold form and including a Hot Tuna tattoo, as well as the CD version, it includes two LPs, with an etched portrait on side four. Each side without the etching has four songs.

== Recording ==
After years of releasing live albums, Kaukonen felt it was time to record a new electric studio album with the band when his current label for his solo work, Red House Records, was interested. Kaukonen started by writing one song, but with deadlines set and being locked in to studio time with the band, he collaborated and ended up writing six songs for the album. The band used Levon Helm's studio where Kaukonen had recorded his previous solo album, River of Time. For the new album, Kaukonen decided to take the approach he used with Jefferson Airplane, letting others work out the charts for the rhythm section and concentrating on the lead guitar lines. Also to reflect back to Jefferson Airplane's style, Teresa Williams recorded harmony vocals similar to Grace Slick's on several tracks.

== Track listing ==
No.	Title	Lyrics	Music	Length
1.	"Angel of Darkness"	Larry Campbell, Jorma Kaukonen	Campbell	4:43
2.	"Children of Zion"	Rev. Gary Davis	Davis	4:50
3.	"Second Chances"	Kaukonen	Kaukonen	4:21
4.	"Goodbye to the Blues"	Marshall Wilborn	Wilborn	4:32
5.	"A Little Faster"	John Hurlbut	Hurlbut	4:55
6.	"Mourning Interrupted"	Kaukonen	Kaukonen	5:06
7.	"Easy Now Revisited"	Kaukonen	Kaukonen, Campbell	3:41
8.	"Smokerise Journey"	Kaukonen	Jack Casady, Campbell	4:28
9.	"Things That Might Have Been"	Kaukonen	Kaukonen	4:15
10.	"Mama Let Me Lay It On You"	Davis	Davis	4:46
11.	"If This Is Love"	Mark Markham	Markham	5:01
12.	"Vicksburg Stomp" (instrumental)		Papa Charlie McCoy	3:44

== Personnel ==
=== Hot Tuna ===
- Jorma Kaukonen – lead vocals (tracks 1–11), electric guitar (tracks 1, 2, 4–7, 10, 11), acoustic guitar (tracks 3, 4, 8, 9, 12)
- Barry Mitterhoff – electric mandolin (tracks 1, 3–7, 11), acoustic mandolin (tracks 2, 8–10, 12)
- Jack Casady – bass
- Skoota Warner – drums

=== Additional musicians ===
- Larry Campbell – electric guitar (tracks 1, 3, 4, 6–8, 11), acoustic guitar (tracks 1, 2, 5, 8, 10, 12), harmony vocals (tracks 1, 4, 5), pump organ (tracks 1), Resonator guitar (track 2), Hammond organ (track 5–8), violin (tracks 8, 10, 12), pedal steel guitar (tracks 9)
- Teresa Williams – harmony vocals (tracks 1, 2, 5, 8)

=== Production ===
- Larry Campbell – producer
- Justin Guip – engineer
- David Glasser – mastering
- Kevin Morgan – cover art

== Charts ==
Chart	Peak position
US Billboard Independent Albums	46
US Billboard Tastemaker	13
