= Double Dose (Hot Tuna album) =

Live album by Hot Tuna
- Released: March 13, 1978
- Recorded: August 5–6, 1977 at Theatre 1839, San Francisco; Wally Heider Studios (overdubs)
- Genre: Blues rock
- Length: 77:58
- Label: Grunt
- Producer: Felix Pappalardi; Don Gehman (associate); Gail Collins (associate)

Hot Tuna chronology
Flight Log (1977)	Double Dose (1978)	Final Vinyl (1979)

Professional ratings
Review scores
Source	Rating
AllMusic	2.5/5 stars

Double Dose is the eighth album by the American blues rock band Hot Tuna, and their third live album. The album was originally released as a double-LP as Grunt CYL2-2545. After their 1977 tour, Jorma Kaukonen moved on to a solo career and Jack Casady joined the new wave band SVT. Hot Tuna would not perform together again until 1983. The album had its highest peak at #92 on the Billboard charts.

The group recorded the album as a cost-saving alternative to a studio album. However the mixing process considerably raised the album's expense. Producer Felix Pappalardi heavily edited the concert tapes and had Kaukonen re-record his vocals for sides 2 through 4 at Wally Heider Studios.

== Track listing ==
All tracks written by Jorma Kaukonen, except where noted.

Side A
No.	Title	Writer(s)	Length
1.	"Winin' Boy Blues"	Jelly Roll Morton	5:57
2.	"Keep Your Lamps Trimmed and Burning"	Reverend Gary Davis	3:08
3.	"Embryonic Journey"		1:56
4.	"Killing Time in the Crystal City"		6:35

Side B
No.	Title	Writer(s)	Length
1.	"I Wish You Would"	Billy Boy Arnold	4:20
2.	"Genesis"		4:16
3.	"Extrication Love Song"		4:26
4.	"Talking 'Bout You"	Chuck Berry	5:34

Side C
No.	Title	Writer(s)	Length
1.	"Funky #7"	Kaukonen, Jack Casady	8:49
2.	"Serpent of Dreams"		6:43
3.	"Bowlegged Woman, Knock Kneed Man"	Bobby Rush, Calvin Carter	4:51

Side D
No.	Title	Writer(s)	Length
1.	"I See the Light"		5:49
2.	"Watch the North Wind Rise"		4:58
3.	"Sunrise Dance with the Devil"		5:38
4.	"I Can't Be Satisfied"	McKinley Morganfield	4:58

== Personnel ==
=== Side A ===
- Jorma Kaukonen – vocals, acoustic guitar

=== Side B/C/D ===
- Jorma Kaukonen – vocals, guitar
- Jack Casady – bass
- Nick Buck – keyboards, backup vocal on "Talking 'Bout You"
- Bob Steeler – drums

=== Production ===
- Felix Pappalardi – producer
- Don Gehman – associate producer, engineer, mixdown engineer
- Gail Collins – associate producer
- Allen Sudduth – assistant engineer
- Ray Thompson – location engineer
- Dennis Hertzendorfer – assistant mixing engineer
- Sheilah "Sam" Taylor – assistant mixing engineer
- Recorded live by Wally Heider Recording at Theatre 1839, San Francisco
- Additional recording at Wally Heider Studios, San Francisco
- Mixed and assembled at Criteria Recording Studios, Miami
- Mastered at Sterling Sound by George Marino
