= The Phosphorescent Rat =

Studio album by Hot Tuna
- Released: January 3, 1974
- Recorded: May – October 1973 at Wally Heider Studios, San Francisco
- Genre: Blues rock, hard rock
- Length: 37:46
- Label: Grunt
- Producer: Mallory Earl

Hot Tuna chronology
Burgers (1972)	The Phosphorescent Rat (1974)	America's Choice (1975)

Professional ratings
Review scores
Source	Rating
Allmusic	3.5/5 stars
Christgau's Record Guide	C
Rolling Stone	(not rated)

The Phosphorescent Rat is the fourth album by the blues rock group Hot Tuna, released in early 1974 as Grunt BFL1-0348. This was the first Hot Tuna album recorded after guitarist Jorma Kaukonen and bass player Jack Casady had left Jefferson Airplane; the group had been waiting for their return all through 1973 and when this didn't happen, the remaining members changed the name to Jefferson Starship at the start of 1974. The two core members were joined as before by drummer Sammy Piazza, though Papa John Creach had left the band, instead staying on with Jefferson Starship. The band's playing was moving away from the softer, more acoustic sound of their first three albums, and towards a hard rock sound that would be explored on their next three albums.

== Track listing ==
All songs written by Jorma Kaukonen, except where noted

Side one
No.	Title	Length
1.	"I See the Light"	4:15
2.	"Letter to the North Star" (also recorded as "Lord Have Mercy" for Quah; released as a bonus track)	2:31
3.	"Easy Now" (later re-recorded with new lyrics as "Easy Now Revisited" for Steady as She Goes)	5:10
4.	"Corners Without Exits"	3:37
5.	"Day to Day Out the Window Blues"	3:26

Side two
No.	Title	Writer(s)	Length
1.	"In the Kingdom"		5:26
2.	"Seeweed Strut" (instrumental)		3:25
3.	"Living Just for You"		3:18
4.	"Soliloquy for 2"		3:42
5.	"Sally, Where'd You Get Your Liquor From?" (instrumental)	Reverend Gary Davis	2:56

== Personnel ==
- Jorma Kaukonen – vocals, guitars
- Jack Casady – electric bass, bass balalaika
- Sammy Piazza – drums, spoons, percussion

Additional personnel

- Tom Salisbury – conductor of strings and woodwinds on "Corners Without Exits" and "Soliloquy for 2"
- Andrew Narell – steel drums on "Living Just for You"

Production

- Pat Ieraci – production coordinator
- Mallory Earl – recording engineer, mixing engineer
- Steve Mantoani – assistant engineer
- Marek A. Majewski – cover design
- Recorded at Wally Heider's, San Francisco
- Mastered at The Lacquer Channel, Sausalito
