= Quah (album) =

Studio album by Jorma Kaukonen
- Released: September 1974
- Recorded: October 1972; February – May 1973; May 1974
- Studios: Wally Heider Studios, San Francisco
- Genre: Folk rock
- Length: 38:29
- Label: Grunt
- Producer: Jack Casady

Jorma Kaukonen chronology
Quah (1974)	Jorma (1979)

Alternative cover
- Cover art of 1980 reissue

Professional ratings
Review scores
Source	Rating
AllMusic	4.5/5 stars
Encyclopedia of Popular Music	4/5 stars

Quah is the first solo album by Jorma Kaukonen of Hot Tuna and Jefferson Airplane. The album was recorded with Tom Hobson. The initial plan was to have side-A be Kaukonen and side-B be Hobson. However, RCA felt that Hobson's recordings would not be accepted by the public. Initially the record was planned to be released in mid-1973, but because of the issues with Hobson, Kaukonen returned to the studio to record new tracks for side B in May 1974. Only "Blue Prelude" and "Sweet Hawaiian Sunshine" of the original 1974 release feature Hobson's lead vocal, although he also plays guitar on "I'll Let You Know Before I Leave." On the CD reissue, Hobson is featured on all bonus tracks except for "Lord Have Mercy."

In 1980, Grunt Records reissued the album with a different cover that used the photographs that were originally used inside the gatefold. In 1987, Relix Records released the album under license from RCA. It was released on vinyl and was one of the first CDs released by an independent record label in the USA. The first Relix version was pressed in Switzerland, then Japan and finally manufactured in the USA. Relix also released a remastered and graphically revised version in the late 1990s with computer improved tracks from the original masters. BMG (incorporating the former RCA) re-released the original album on CD in 2003, along with the bonus tracks featuring Hobson.

It was voted number 1 in the All-Time 50 Long Forgotten Gems in the third edition of Colin Larkin's All Time Top 1000 Albums (2000).

== Track listing ==
All songs written by Jorma Kaukonen, except where noted

Side one
No.	Title	Writer(s)	Length
1.	"Genesis"		4:19
2.	"I'll Be All Right"	Traditional; arranged by Rev. Gary Davis, Kaukonen	3:08
3.	"Song for the North Star"		2:52
4.	"I'll Let You Know Before I Leave"		2:17
5.	"Flying Clouds"		4:07
6.	"Another Man Done Gone"	Ruby Pickens Tartt, Vera Hall, John Lomax, Alan Lomax	2:54

Side two
No.	Title	Writer(s)	Length
1.	"I am The Light of this World"	Rev. Gary Davis	3:46
2.	"Police Dog Blues"	Blind Arthur Blake; arranged by Kaukonen	3:45
3.	"Blue Prelude"	Gordon Jenkins	4:05
4.	"Sweet Hawaiian Sunshine"	Tom Hobson	2:42
5.	"Hamar Promenade"		4:34

2003 CD reissue bonus tracks
No.	Title	Writer(s)	Length
1.	"Lord Have Mercy" (also recorded for The Phosphorescent Rat as "Letter to the North Star")		3:19
2.	"No Mail Today"	Blind John Davis	4:47
3.	"Midnight in Milpitas"		2:14
4.	"Barrier"		4:42

== Personnel ==
- Jorma Kaukonen – vocals on all tracks except Tom Hobson tracks, "I'll Let You Know Before I Leave", and "Lord Have Mercy", acoustic guitar on all tracks except "Sweet Hawaiian Sunshine" and "Barrier", 12-string slide guitar on "Another Man Done Gone"
- Tom Hobson – vocals on "Blue Prelude", "Sweet Hawaiian Sunshine", "No Mail Today", and "Barrier", acoustic guitar on "I'll Let You Know Before I Leave", "Blue Prelude", "Sweet Hawaiian Sunshine", "No Mail Today", "Midnight in Milpitas", and "Barrier"

=== Additional personnel ===
- Edward Neff – fiddle on "Flying Clouds"
- Teressa Adams, Melinda Ross – celli on "Genesis", "Song for the North Star", and "Flying Clouds"
- Nancy Ellis, Miriam Dye, Don Ehrlich, Mary Jo Ahlborn – violas on "Genesis", "Song for the North Star", and "Flying Clouds"
- Thomas Heimberg – viola on "Flying Clouds"
- Nathan Rubin, Thomas Halpin, Daniel Kobialka, Carl Pederson, Eva Karasik, Anne Kish – violins on "Genesis", "Song for the North Star", and "Flying Clouds"
- Mischa Myers – violin on "Flying Clouds"
- Arthur Krehbiel – French horn on "Flying Clouds"
- Gene Tortora – Dobro on "Sweet Hawaiian Sunshine"
- Tom Salisbury – strings arranger, strings conductor

=== Production ===
- Jack Casady – producer
- Pat Ieraci (Maurice) – production coordinator
- Mallory Earl – recording engineer, mixing engineer
- Margareta Kaukonen – cover
- Jim Marshall – photography
- Recorded at Wally Heider's, San Francisco
