= Hoppkorv =

Studio album by Hot Tuna
- Released: October 11, 1976
- Recorded: July 1976
- Studio: Wally Heider Studios, San Francisco
- Genre: Blues rock
- Length: 36:02
- Label: Grunt
- Producer: Harry Maslin

Hot Tuna chronology
Yellow Fever (1975)	Hoppkorv (1976)	Flight Log (1977)

Professional ratings
Review scores
Source	Rating
AllMusic	3/5 stars
Encyclopedia of Popular Music	4/5 stars

Hoppkorv was the seventh album by the American blues rock band Hot Tuna, and their last studio album recorded for Grunt Records. Unlike previous albums, Hot Tuna relied entirely on an outside producer for this effort, Harry Maslin. In addition to four new original songs by Jorma Kaukonen and one by Nick Buck, the album includes covers of Buddy Holly's "It's So Easy", Muddy Waters' "I Can't Be Satisfied", and Chuck Berry's "Talkin' 'bout You."

Released in 1976, the album reached number 116 on the Billboard charts. In 1996, RCA released the CD box set Hot Tuna in a Can which included a remastered version of this album, along with remasters of the albums Hot Tuna, First Pull Up, Then Pull Down, Burgers and America's Choice.

The album's name, loosely translated from Swedish as "jumping sausage" comes from an incident during frontman Kaukonen's visit to Östersund, Sweden in 1976. Kaukonen's ice skating buddy Håkan Sannemo attempted to eat a sausage that "jumped" off his plate and he shouted "jävla hoppkorv" ("bloody jumping sausage"). Later the same year Kaukonen invited Sannemo to San Francisco to experience the recording of his band's new album, named after said "jumping sausage".

== Track listing ==
Side A
No.	Title	Writer(s)	Length
1.	"Santa Claus Retreat"	Jorma Kaukonen	4:10
2.	"Watch the North Wind Rise"	Kaukonen	4:39
3.	"It's So Easy"	Buddy Holly, Norman Petty	2:32
4.	"Bowlegged Woman, Knock-Kneed Man"	Bobby Rush, Calvin Carter	3:05
5.	"Drivin' Around"	Nick Buck	2:53

Side B
No.	Title	Writer(s)	Length
1.	"I Wish You Would"	Billy Boy Arnold	3:10
2.	"I Can't Be Satisfied"	McKinley Morganfield	3:52
3.	"Talkin' 'bout You"	Chuck Berry	3:29
4.	"Extrication Love Song"	Kaukonen	4:11
5.	"Song from the Stainless Cymbal"	Kaukonen	4:01

== Personnel ==
- Jorma Kaukonen – vocals, guitar
- Jack Casady – bass
- Bob Steeler – drums, percussion

=== Additional personnel ===
- Nick Buck – keyboards
- John Sherman – 2nd guitar on "Bowlegged Woman, Knock-Kneed Man"
- Karen Tobin – background vocals

=== Production ===
- Harry Maslin – producer, engineer
- Pat Ieraci (Maurice) – production coordinator
- Bill Thompson – manager
- Allen Sudduth – assistant engineer
- David Gertz – assistant mixing engineer
- Michael Casady, Ron Dudley – equipment
- Acy Lehman – art direction
- Gribbitt (Tim Bryant) – album design
- Chris Whorf – album design
- Roger Rossmeyer – cover photos, liner photos
- Jerry Leiberwitz (Leibowitz) – sleeve painting
- Recorded and Mixed at Wally Heider Studios, San Francisco
- Mastered by Rick Collins, Kendun Recorders, Burbank
