= America's Choice =

Studio album by Hot Tuna
- Released: May 1975
- Recorded: September–October 1974 at Wally Heider Studios, San Francisco
- Genre: Blues rock
- Length: 44:36
- Label: Grunt
- Producers: Hot Tuna, Mallory Earl

Hot Tuna chronology
The Phosphorescent Rat (1973)	America's Choice (1975)	Yellow Fever (1975)

Professional ratings
Review scores
Source	Rating
Allmusic	3/5 stars
Encyclopedia of Popular Music	3/5 stars

America's Choice is the fifth album by the American blues rock band Hot Tuna, recorded in 1974, and released in 1975 as Grunt BFL1-0820. The album was also released in Quadraphonic as Grunt BFD1-0820. The first of the "Rampage" trilogy albums (the others being Yellow Fever and Hoppkorv) recorded by the now power trio, it marked a major shift in musical direction by the group. With new drummer Bob Steeler, Tuna now performed in a predominantly hard rock style, leaving the earlier band's mixture of electric and acoustic material.

== Songs ==
All but one of the tracks is penned by Kaukonen, with some help from Casady on "Funky #7". Despite its title, "Hit Single #1" was not released as a single.

== Cover art ==
The album cover art depicts a box of laundry detergent, complete with dripping suds, labeled "America's Choice: Hot Tuna". The lettering and color scheme are loosely based on the style of Tide. On one side of the detergent box, a contents label lists the musicians as the "active ingredients", and also says, "Pure, unadulterated sounds with amplified additives and the necessary polytonal ingredients to handle heavy loads." On another side of the box is a "warning" stating, "This album to be played at full volume for maximum effect."

== Release ==
Released in May 1975, the album rose to No. 75 on the Billboard charts. Unedited extended live versions of "Invitation" recorded at the New York York Palladium November 26, 1976, and Santa Clara University May 28, 1977, are available.

In 1996, RCA released the CD box set Hot Tuna in a Can which included a remastered version of this album, along with remasters of the albums Hot Tuna, First Pull Up, Then Pull Down, Burgers, and Hoppkorv.

== Track listing ==
All songs written by Jorma Kaukonen, except where noted.

Side A
No.	Title	Writer(s)	Length
1.	"Sleep Song"		4:23
2.	"Funky #7"	Jack Casady, Kaukonen	5:47
3.	"Walkin' Blues"	Robert Johnson	5:22
4.	"Invitation"		6:50

Side B
No.	Title	Length
1.	"Hit Single #1"	5:10
2.	"Serpent of Dreams"	6:52
3.	"I Don't Wanna Go"	4:56
4.	"Great Divide: Revisited"	5:16

== Personnel ==
- Jorma Kaukonen – guitars, vocals
- Jack Casady – bass
- Bob Steeler – drums, percussion

=== Production ===
- Hot Tuna, Fishobaby – producer
- Mallory Earl – producer, engineer
- Bill Thompson – overseer
- Pat Ieraci (Maurice) – production coordinator
- Steve Mantoani – recordist
- Jeffrey Husband – recordist
- Michael Casady – equipment
- Frank Mulvey – cover concept
- Recorded and Mixed at Wally Heider's Studios, San Francisco
- Mastered by Rick Collins, Kendun Recorders, Burbank
