= Hot Tuna (album) =

Live album by Hot Tuna
- Released: May 1970
- Recorded: September 16 to 24, 1969; New Orleans House, Berkeley
- Genre: Country blues
- Length: 45:59; 67:51 (reissue)
- Label: RCA Victor
- Producer: Al Schmitt

Hot Tuna chronology
| Hot Tuna (1970) | First Pull Up, Then Pull Down (1971) |

Professional ratings
Review scores
| Source | Rating |
|---|---|
| Allmusic | 4/5 stars |
| Christgau's Record Guide | B+ |
| Rolling Stone | (not rated) |
| Encyclopedia of Popular Music | 4/5 stars |

Hot Tuna is the debut album by the American blues rock band Hot Tuna, released in 1970 as RCA Victor LSP-4353. It was recorded live at the New Orleans House in Berkeley, California in September 1969. It peaked at #30 on the Billboard 200 album chart.

== Context and content ==
Hot Tuna began as a means of relaxation for Jorma Kaukonen and Jack Casady while on tour with Jefferson Airplane, eventually becoming a separate entity within that band to the point of performing as its opening act. In the beginning, Hot Tuna would play in the style of electric Chicago blues often augmented by Airplane members, such represented by a cover of B.B. King's "Rock Me Baby" on the live Airplane album Bless Its Pointed Little Head. For their first album, Kaukonen and Casady decided on a semi-acoustic set rooted in the country blues of the pre-World War II era.

The Reverend Gary Davis had been an early influence on Kaukonen, and two of his songs were included on the album, with an additional pair included on the 1996 reissue. Casady and Kaukonen demonstrated their familiarity with Dixieland and ragtime as well as blues by the inclusion of "Hesitation Blues," recorded by the Victor Military Band in 1916, and the inclusion of two numbers attributed to Jelly Roll Morton. They also ignored any purist notions of the Delta blues with their cover of "How Long Blues" by Leroy Carr, who not only was not from the Mississippi Delta and did not play guitar, but was also one of the commercial urban blues successes of the 1930s.

In 1996, RCA reissued the album on compact disc with five bonus tracks recorded at the same time. The box set Hot Tuna in a Can included this version along with remasters of the band's subsequent four albums First Pull Up Then Pull Down, Burgers, America's Choice and Hoppkorv. The box set is also out of print.

In 2012, Iconoclassic Records remastered and reissued the album with a bonus disc of 13 more tracks - the entire set that was performed on the evening of September 19, 1969 - from the same September period in 1969 as the original disc. This set was mastered by Vic Anesini, and includes an essay from Airplane biographer Jeff Tamarkin.

== Track listing ==
Side one
| No. | Title | Writer(s) | Length |
|---|---|---|---|
| 1. | "Hesitation Blues" | traditional, arranged by Jorma Kaukonen, Jack Casady | 5:05 |
| 2. | "How Long Blues" | Leroy Carr | 3:24 |
| 3. | "Uncle Sam Blues" | traditional, arranged by Kaukonen, Casady | 5:04 |
| 4. | "Don't You Leave Me Here" | Jelly Roll Morton | 2:50 |
| 5. | "Death Don't Have No Mercy" | Rev. Gary Davis | 6:10 |

Side two
| No. | Title | Writer(s) | Length |
|---|---|---|---|
| 1. | "Know You Rider" | traditional, arranged by Kaukonen, Casady | 3:59 |
| 2. | "Oh Lord, Search My Heart" | Davis | 3:47 |
| 3. | "Winin' Boy Blues" | Morton | 5:25 |
| 4. | "New Song (for the Morning)" | Kaukonen | 4:55 |
| 5. | "Mann's Fate" (instrumental) | Kaukonen | 5:20 |

1996 reissue bonus tracks
| No. | Title | Writer(s) | Length |
|---|---|---|---|
| 11. | "Keep Your Lamps Trimmed and Burning" | Davis | 3:48 |
| 12. | "Candy Man" | Davis | 3:35 |
| 13. | "True Religion" | Kaukonen | 5:23 |
| 14. | "Belly Shadow" (instrumental) | Kaukonen | 2:59 |
| 15. | "Come Back Baby" | Walter Davis | 6:07 |

2012 Iconoclassic reissue bonus disc 2
| No. | Title | Length |
|---|---|---|
| 1. | "Winin' Boy Blues" |
| 2. | "Death Don't Have No Mercy" |
| 3. | "Keep on Truckin'" |
| 4. | "Come Back Baby" |
| 5. | "Uncle Sam Blues" |
| 6. | "Know You Rider" |
| 7. | "That'll Never Happen No More" |
| 8. | "How Long Blues" |
| 9. | "True Religion" |
| 10. | "Don't You Leave Me Here" |
| 11. | "Candy Man" |
| 12. | "Sea Child" |
| 13. | "Keep Your Lamps Trimmed and Burning" |

== Personnel ==
- Jorma Kaukonen – acoustic guitar, vocals
- Jack Casady – bass guitar

Additional personnel

- Will Scarlett – harmonica

=== Production ===
- Al Schmitt – producer
- Allen Zentz – engineer
- Pat Ieraci – master of the machines
- Margareta Kaukonen – painting
- Mike Frankel – photography
- Gut – art direction
