= Hot Tuna =

American blues rock band

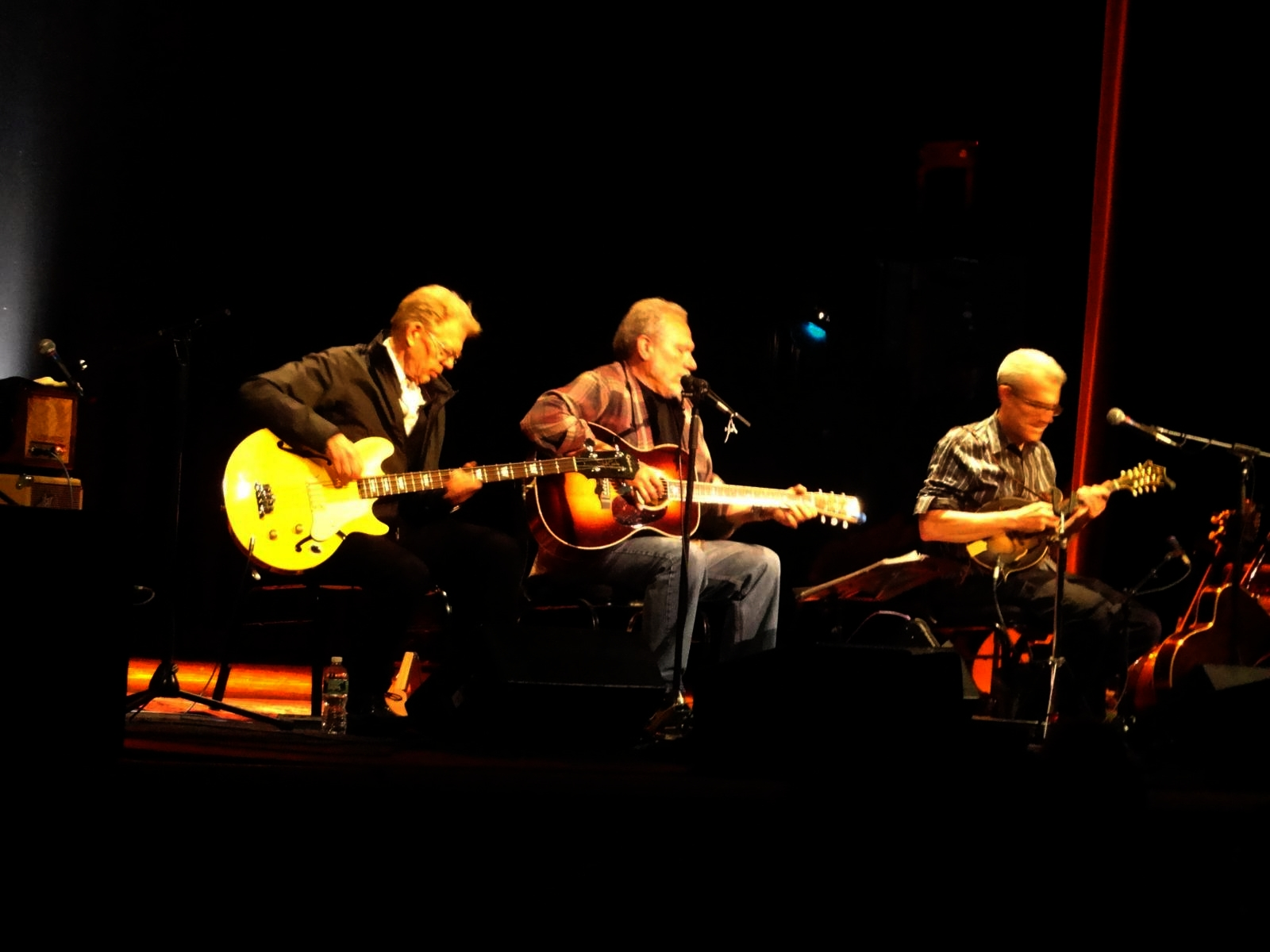
- Casady, Kaukonen, and Mitterhoff performing in 2013

Background information
- Origin: San Francisco, California, U.S.
- Genres: Blues rock, Americana
- Years active: 1969–1977, 1983, 1986–present
- Labels: RCA/Grunt, Relix, Eagle, Red House
- Spinoff of: Jefferson Airplane
- Members: Jack Casady; Jorma Kaukonen
- Past members: Will Scarlett; Joey Covington; Paul Kantner; Marty Balin; Peter Kaukonen; Paul Ziegler; Papa John Creach; Sammy Piazza; Bob Steeler; Michael Falzarano; Shigemi Komiyama; Joey Balin; Joey Stefko; Harvey Sorgen; Galen Underwood; Pete Sears; Erik Diaz; Skoota Warner; Barry Mitterhoff
- Website: www.hottuna.com

Hot Tuna is an American blues rock band formed in 1969 by former Jefferson Airplane members Jorma Kaukonen (guitar/vocals) and Jack Casady (bass). Although it has always been a fluid aggregation, with musicians coming and going over the years, the band's center has always been Kaukonen and Casady's ongoing collaboration.

== History ==
=== 1969–1973: beginnings ===
Hot Tuna began as a side project to Jefferson Airplane, intended to mark time while Grace Slick recovered from vocal cord nodule surgery that had left her unable to perform. They initially named the group Hot Shit but then decided on the more innocuous Hot Tuna. That name came from someone Jorma Kaukonen referred to as a "witty wag" who called out "hot tuna" after hearing the line "What's that smell like fish, oh baby", from the song "Keep On Truckin' ". Kaukonen, Jack Casady, Paul Kantner and new drummer Joey Covington played several shows around San Francisco, including the Airplane's original club, The Matrix, before Jefferson Airplane resumed performing to support Volunteers. (Although Covington had been hired by Jefferson Airplane, he only performed at select engagements, with Spencer Dryden continuing to perform as the band's principal drummer until his 1970 dismissal.) Once the Airplane had resumed touring, Tuna found itself opening for the Airplane. Their early repertoire derived mainly from Kaukonen's Airplane material and covers of American country and blues artists such as Reverend Gary Davis, Jelly Roll Morton, Bo Carter and Blind Blake.

In September 1969, Kaukonen and Casady employed the moniker for a week of acoustic-based concerts at the New Orleans House in Berkeley, California; recordings culled from this engagement were released as the band's eponymous debut album in 1970. This album has become affectionately known by the group's fans as the "breaking glass album", because of the sound of breaking beer glasses during the recording of "Uncle Sam Blues". Some tracks included Will Scarlett on harmonica. After the album was recorded, Jorma's brother Peter Kaukonen soon replaced Kantner on rhythm guitar and Jefferson Airplane co-lead vocalist Marty Balin joined on vocals for the electric songs. In 1970, the younger Kaukonen was replaced by Paul Ziegler.

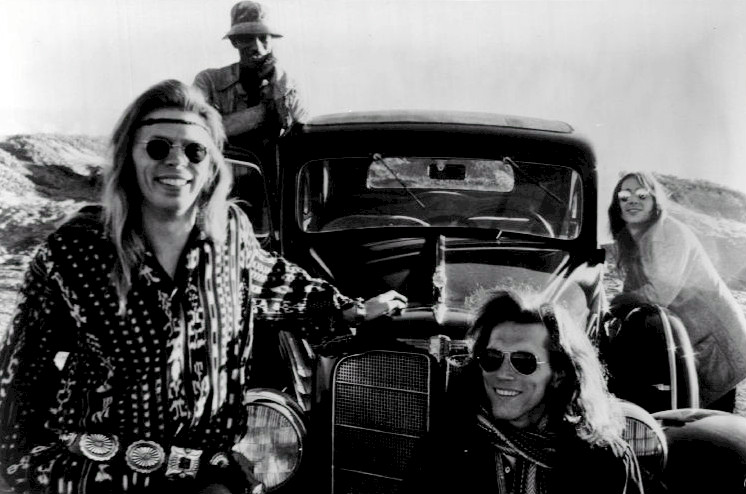
The band in 1972. Casady and Kaukonen are in front; Creach and Piazza are in back.

That summer, RCA paid for the band to go to Jamaica to record their next album, but the album was never finished, in part due to a financial dispute between Balin (who left both bands shortly thereafter) and Kaukonen and Casady. Violinist Papa John Creach joined Hot Tuna and Jefferson Airplane in October 1970. Both bands finished a joint tour in November 1970 with shows at the Fillmore East.

In September 1970, Kaukonen and Casady performed two acoustic-based shows as Hot Tuna without Jefferson Airplane at Pepperland (a large dance hall in San Rafael, California) and received good reviews, further signifying that Hot Tuna could survive without the other band to support it.

As Jefferson Airplane wound down and stopped regularly touring for over eighteen months (save for a handful of concerts in the summer of 1971 and winter of 1972) after the Fillmore East shows, Hot Tuna became an independent group. In this era, Hot Tuna's members were Kaukonen, Casady, drummer Sammy Piazza, and Creach, moving fully to the electric band format. This lineup was first documented on the album First Pull Up, Then Pull Down (1971), which was recorded live at the Chateau Liberte, an obscure club located near Los Gatos, California, in the Santa Cruz Mountains that was favored by the band throughout the era. The group also appeared on three tracks from Papa John Creach's debut solo album, as well as "Walking the Tou Tou" from his second album, Filthy!

The studio albums Burgers (1972) and The Phosphorescent Rat (1974) followed, with Creach leaving before the latter was recorded. These two albums featured mostly Kaukonen compositions. On the former album, David Crosby sang supporting vocals on "Highway Song", while keyboardist Nick Buck (who frequently guested with the group in the studio for the next five years before serving as a touring member in 1977) contributed to two tracks.

=== 1974–1977: Power trio ===
As the band prepared for its 1974 tour in support of The Phosphorescent Rat, Kaukonen laid off Piazza after deciding to have the band return to its semi-acoustic repertoire. Kaukonen and Casady then proceeded to record Kaukonen's first solo album, Quah. However, July 1974 marked a departure from their primarily bluesy, acoustic style when Hot Tuna dropped their acoustic sets completely and morphed into a heavy rock band. In October 1974, the group performed on The Midnight Special.

The albums America's Choice (1975), Yellow Fever (1975), and Hoppkorv (1976) showcase a power trio with the addition of new drummer Bob Steeler. Jeff Tamarkin's liner notes on the RCA "Platinum Gold Hot Tuna Collection" characterize this trilogy as being emblematic of the band's "rampage years." Kaukonen is quoted as saying the change of focus was because "it was just fun to be loud." During this period, Kaukonen's electric guitar playing was multi-layered, prominently showcasing such effects as the Roland Jet phaser. His "rampage" style is typified by the solos on "Funky #7" and "Serpent of Dreams" on America's Choice and "Song for the Fire Maiden," "Sunrise Dance with the Devil," and "Surphase Tension" on Yellow Fever. Live performances throughout the epoch were distinguished by free-flow improvisational jams and very long sets (up to six hours uninterrupted) with extended versions of their studio material. A November 1976 concert at the Palladium in New York City featured a 16-minute version of "Invitation." However, producer Harry Maslin did not appreciate the group's style and held them to a more traditional rock format (including several cover songs) for Hoppkorv. In 1977, Kaukonen began to perform solo sets before the band would perform. The trio stopped touring at the end of 1977 and performed its final concert at the Palladium on November 26, with keyboardist Nick Buck and saxophonist "Buffalo" Bob Roberts.

Although live performances from all iterations of the group enjoyed a notable cult following for much of the 1970s, Hot Tuna failed to rival or eclipse Jefferson Airplane and Jefferson Starship from a commercial standpoint. All but two Hot Tuna albums from the era reached the Billboard Top 100, America's Choice was their only post-1972 album to chart for more than ten weeks, peaking at No. 75.

=== 1978–1985: hiatus and brief reunion ===
Due to emergent tensions between Kaukonen and Casady, a planned 1978 tour was canceled, with Kaukonen filling these dates by performing solo. A double live album, Double Dose, was released that year as a document of the previous year's tour. Casady and Kaukonen went their separate ways and pursued short-lived careers in the new wave bands SVT and Vital Parts, respectively. In 1979, Kaukonen released his second solo album and Grunt Records released the Hot Tuna compilation Final Vinyl.

Rhythm guitarist Michael Falzarano and drummer Shigemi Komiyama joined Kaukonen and Casady for a Hot Tuna reunion tour in 1983. The group played a mix of new material alongside the classic Hot Tuna songs. This, combined with the group's hard rock and heavy metal approach, were not well received, with reports of fans walking out of shows.

=== 1986–present ===
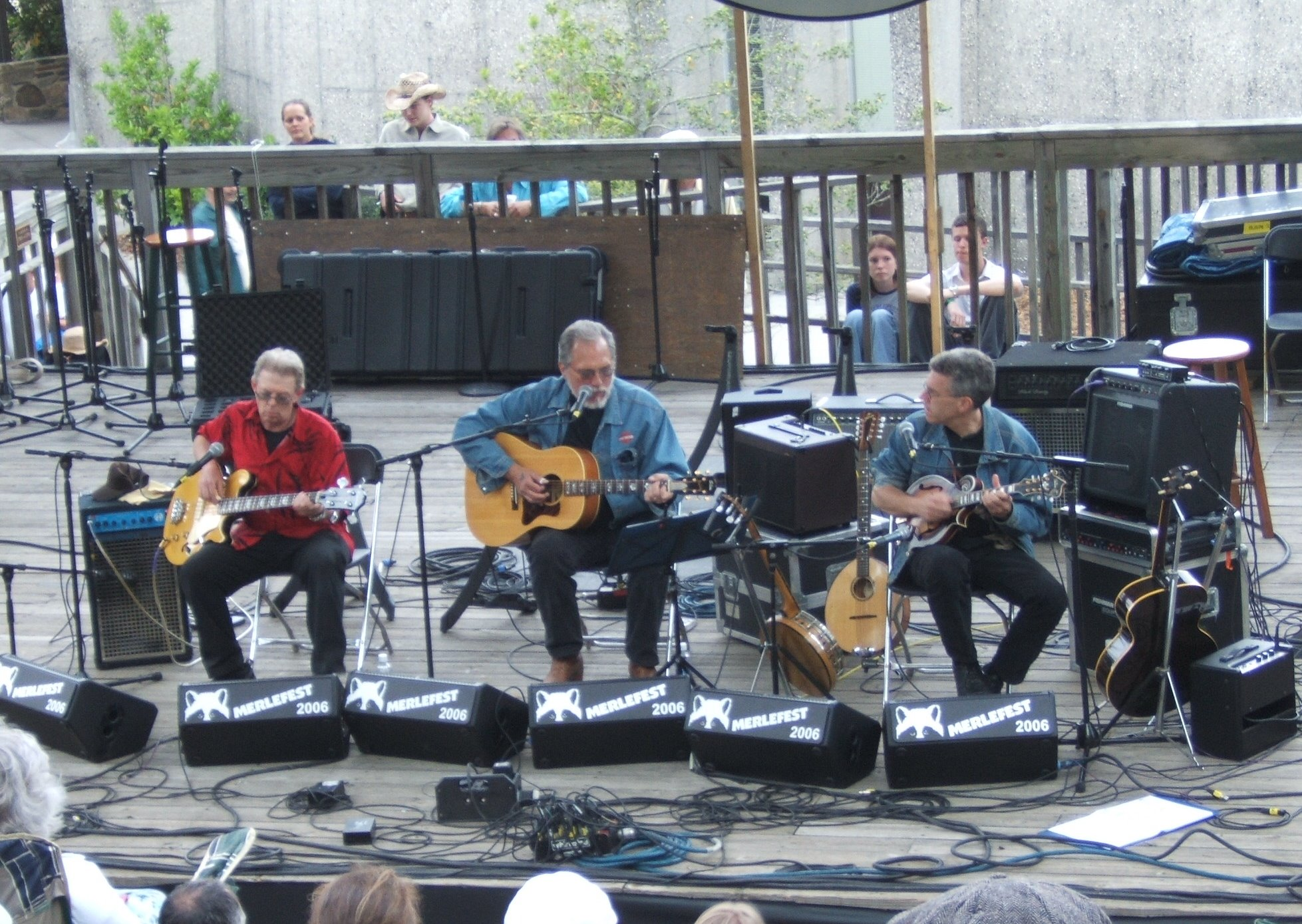
Hot Tuna at MerleFest 2006. Left to right, Jack Casady, Jorma Kaukonen and Barry Mitterhoff.

Hot Tuna again reformed in 1986, with producer Joey Balin joining on rhythm guitar until 1987. Kantner joined the band in 1987 and 1988, adding some old Jefferson Airplane songs to the setlist. Grace Slick appeared with them for one show at The Fillmore in March 1988. The band continued into 1989 and Kaukonen and Casady joined the 1989 Jefferson Airplane reunion album and tour, performing acoustic Hot Tuna sets in the middle of each show. At the end of the Airplane tour, Hot Tuna resumed their electric performances, adding Falzarano and drummer Joey Stefko. Shortly thereafter, New Yorker Harvey Sorgen replaced Stefko on drums and Galen Underwood joined on keyboards for their first album of all new material in almost 14 years, 1990's Pair a Dice Found. Kaukonen and Falzarano both contributed original songs.

Throughout the 1990s, Hot Tuna again alternated between acoustic and electric styles. The two Sweetwater albums were predominantly acoustic sets with guests such as Bob Weir, Maria Muldaur and former Jefferson Starship bassist-keyboardist Pete Sears; the latter was to join the group for the remainder of the decade.

On August 13, 1994 the duo would perform with "The Band & Friends" (along with Bruce Hornsby) on the South Stage at Woodstock '94.

The 1997 release Live in Japan was in many ways reminiscent of the very first Hot Tuna album, having a minimalistic sound and being recorded live at a tiny venue (Stove's in Yokohama). Falzarano and Sears stayed with the band until the early 2000s.

In 2004, Casady and Kaukonen were joined by mandolinist Barry Mitterhoff and drummer Erik Diaz. In August 2009, following the departure of Diaz, Skoota Warner officially joined the band as drummer. In November 2010, Hot Tuna performed as a semi-acoustic trio: Casady, Kaukonen and Mitterhoff at a Midnight Ramble at Levon Helm's Barn studio in Woodstock, New York. In the same month, Kaukonen announced on his blog that Hot Tuna had begun recording its first studio album in 20 years. The album, Steady as She Goes, was released by Red House Records on April 5, 2011. For the first half of 2011, guitarist Jim Lauderdale and harmonica player Charlie Musselwhite toured with them; later in the year they were joined by Musselwhite, guitarists David Bromberg, Larry Campbell, Steve Kimock, and G. E. Smith, and vocalist Teresa Williams. Both Campbell and Williams, who guested on the Steady as She Goes album, have remained with the band in a touring capacity. In 2014, Justin Guip, who had engineered the album in addition to Kaukonen's recent solo work, took over drumming duties from Warner.

== Personnel ==
=== Members ===
The band has performed live as Hot Tuna between 1969 and 1977; in 1983; and from 1986 to present:

==== Current members ====
- Jack Casady – bass (1969–1977, 1983, 1986–present)
- Jorma Kaukonen – lead guitar, vocals (1969–1977, 1983, 1986–present)

Touring musicians

- Larry Campbell – rhythm guitar, vocals, violin, lap steel guitar (2011–present)
- Teresa Williams – vocals (2011–present)
- Justin Guip – drums (2014–present)

Studio musicians

- Robert McCrimlisk – mandolin (2014–present)
- Christopher McGrath – banjo (2014–present)

==== Former members ====
- Joey Covington – drums (1969–1970; died 2013)
- Paul Kantner – rhythm guitar (1969, 1987–1988; died 2016)
- Marty Balin – vocals (1969–1970; died 2018)
- Peter Kaukonen – rhythm guitar (1969–1970, 1989–1990)
- Paul Ziegler – rhythm guitar (1970)
- Papa John Creach – electric violin (1970–1973; died 1994)
- Sammy Piazza – drums (1970–1973)
- Bob Steeler – drums (1974–1977)
- Michael Falzarano – rhythm guitar, vocals (1983, 1989–2002)
- Shigemi Komiyama – drums (1983)
- Joey Balin – rhythm guitar (1986–1987)
- Joey Stefko – drums (1989–1990)
- Harvey Sorgen – drums (1990–2000)
- Galen Underwood – keyboards (1990)
- Pete Sears – keyboards (1992–2001)
- Barry Mitterhoff – mandolin (2002–2014)
- Erik Diaz – drums (2004–2009)
- Skoota Warner – drums (2009–2014)

Studio and touring musicians

- Will Scarlett – harmonica (1969–1971)
- Nick Buck – keyboards (1976–1978)
- Jim Lauderdale – rhythm guitar (2011)
- Charlie Musselwhite – harmonica (2011)
- David Bromberg – rhythm guitar (2011)
- Steve Kimock – rhythm guitar (2011)
- G. E. Smith – rhythm guitar (2011)

=== Lineups ===
1969	1969–1970	1970	1970
Jack Casady – bass; Jorma Kaukonen – lead guitar, vocals; Joey Covington – drums; Paul Kantner – rhythm guitar	Jack Casady – bass; Jorma Kaukonen – lead guitar, vocals; Joey Covington – drums; Marty Balin – vocals; Peter Kaukonen – rhythm guitar	Jack Casady – bass; Jorma Kaukonen – lead guitar, vocals; Joey Covington – drums; Marty Balin – vocals; Paul Ziegler – rhythm guitar	Jack Casady – bass; Jorma Kaukonen – lead guitar, vocals; Joey Covington – drums; Marty Balin – vocals; Paul Ziegler – rhythm guitar; Papa John Creach – electric violin
1970–1973	1973	1973–1974	1974–1977
Jack Casady – bass; Jorma Kaukonen – guitars, vocals; Papa John Creach – electric violin; Sammy Piazza – drums	Jack Casady – bass; Jorma Kaukonen – guitars, vocals; Sammy Piazza – drums	Jack Casady – bass; Jorma Kaukonen – guitars, vocals	Jack Casady – bass; Jorma Kaukonen – guitars, vocals; Bob Steeler – drums
1977–1983	1983	1983–1986	1986–1987
Disbanded	Jack Casady – bass; Jorma Kaukonen – lead guitar, vocals; Michael Falzarano – rhythm guitar, vocals; Shigemi Komiyama – drums	Disbanded	Jack Casady – bass; Jorma Kaukonen – lead guitar, vocals; Joey Balin – rhythm guitar
1987–1988	1988–1989	1989–1990	1990
Jack Casady – bass; Jorma Kaukonen – lead guitar, vocals; Paul Kantner – rhythm guitar	Jack Casady – bass; Jorma Kaukonen – guitars, vocals	Jack Casady – bass; Jorma Kaukonen – lead guitar, vocals; Michael Falzarano – rhythm guitar, vocals; Joey Stefko – drums	Jack Casady – bass; Jorma Kaukonen – lead guitar, vocals; Michael Falzarano – rhythm guitar, vocals; Harvey Sorgen – drums; Galen Underwood – keyboards
1990–1992	1992–2000	2000–2001	2001–2002
Jack Casady – bass; Jorma Kaukonen – lead guitar, vocals; Michael Falzarano – rhythm guitar, vocals; Harvey Sorgen – drums	Jack Casady – bass; Jorma Kaukonen – lead guitar, vocals; Michael Falzarano – rhythm guitar, vocals; Harvey Sorgen – drums; Pete Sears – keyboards	Jack Casady – bass; Jorma Kaukonen – lead guitar, vocals; Michael Falzarano – rhythm guitar, vocals; Pete Sears – keyboards	Jack Casady – bass; Jorma Kaukonen – lead guitar, vocals; Michael Falzarano – rhythm guitar, vocals
2002–2004	2004–2009	2009–2014	2014–present
Jack Casady – bass; Jorma Kaukonen – guitars, vocals	Jack Casady – bass; Jorma Kaukonen – guitars, vocals; Barry Mitterhoff – mandolin; Erik Diaz – drums	Jack Casady – bass; Jorma Kaukonen – guitars, vocals; Barry Mitterhoff – mandolin; Skoota Warner – drums	Jack Casady – bass; Jorma Kaukonen – guitars, vocals; Justin Guip – drums

== Discography ==
- Hot Tuna (1970)
- First Pull Up, Then Pull Down (1971)
- Burgers (1972)
- The Phosphorescent Rat (1974)
- America's Choice (1975)
- Yellow Fever (1975)
- Hoppkorv (1976)
- Double Dose (1978)
- Pair a Dice Found (1990)
- Live at Sweetwater (1992)
- Live at Sweetwater Two (1993)
- Live in Japan (1997)
- And Furthurmore... (1999)
- Steady as She Goes (2011)
