= Jack Casady =

American bass guitarist (born 1944)

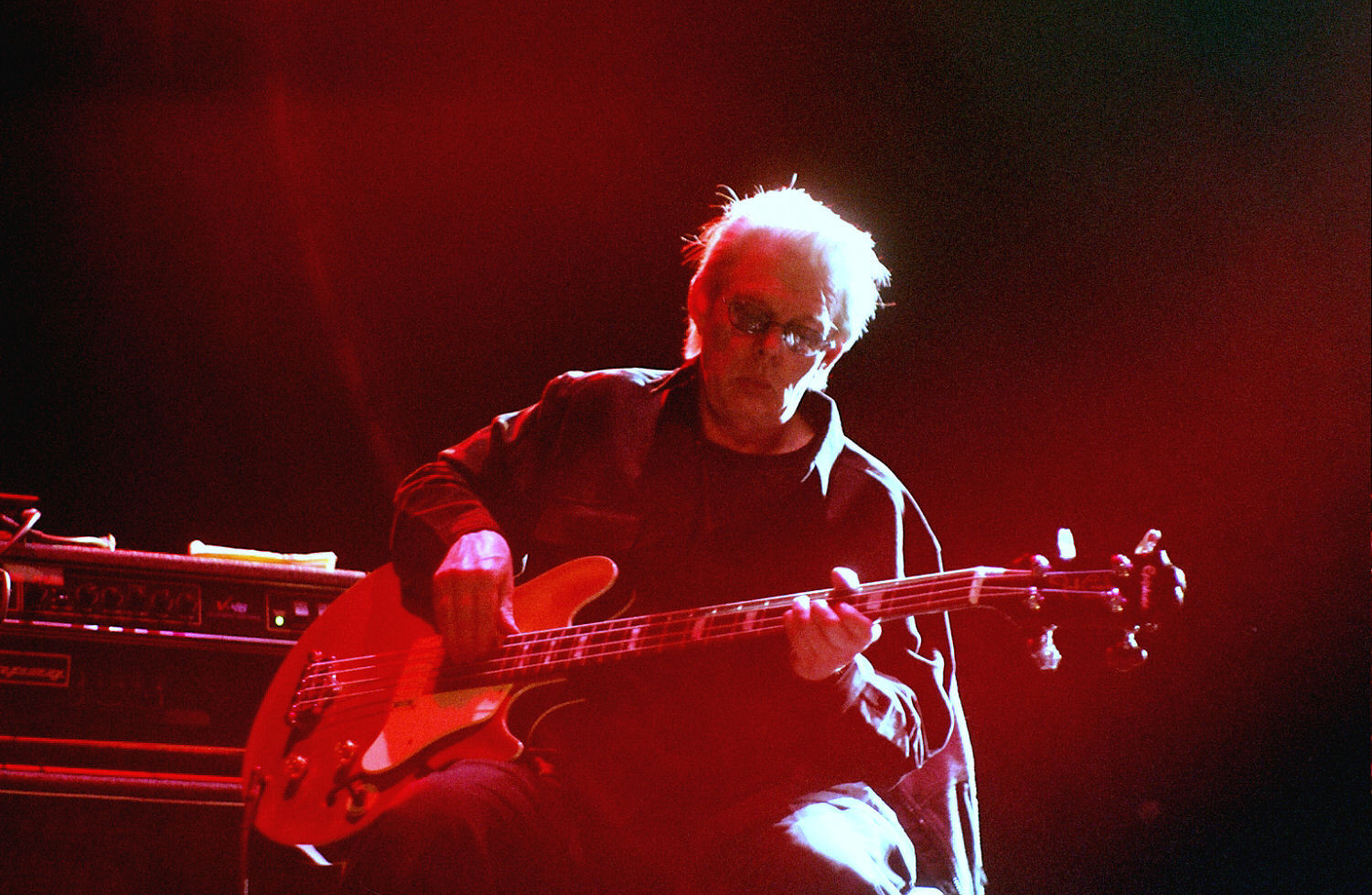
- Casady playing his signature bass with Hot Tuna in 2005

Background information
- Born: John William Casady; April 13, 1944 (age 82); Washington, D.C., U.S.
- Genres: Rock, blues
- Instrument: Bass guitar
- Years active: 1964–present
- Website: www.jackcasady.com

John William Casady (born April 13, 1944) is an American bass guitarist, best known as a member of Jefferson Airplane and Hot Tuna. Jefferson Airplane became the first successful exponent of the San Francisco sound. Singles including "Somebody to Love" and "White Rabbit" charted in 1967 and 1968. Casady, along with the other members of Jefferson Airplane, was inducted into the Rock and Roll Hall of Fame in 1996.

== Early life ==
Casady was born in Washington D.C., the son of Mary Virginia (née Quimby) and William Robert Casady. His father was of half Irish Protestant and half Polish Jewish ancestry. His mother was a relative of aviator Harriet Quimby; some of her family had been in North America since the 1600s.

First playing as a lead guitarist with the Washington, D.C.-area rhythm and blues band The Triumphs, he switched to bass during his high school years, and while still underage (and with a forged I.D.) played the Washington D.C. club scene, backing artists such as Little Anthony and the Imperials.

== Jefferson Airplane years 1965–1972 ==
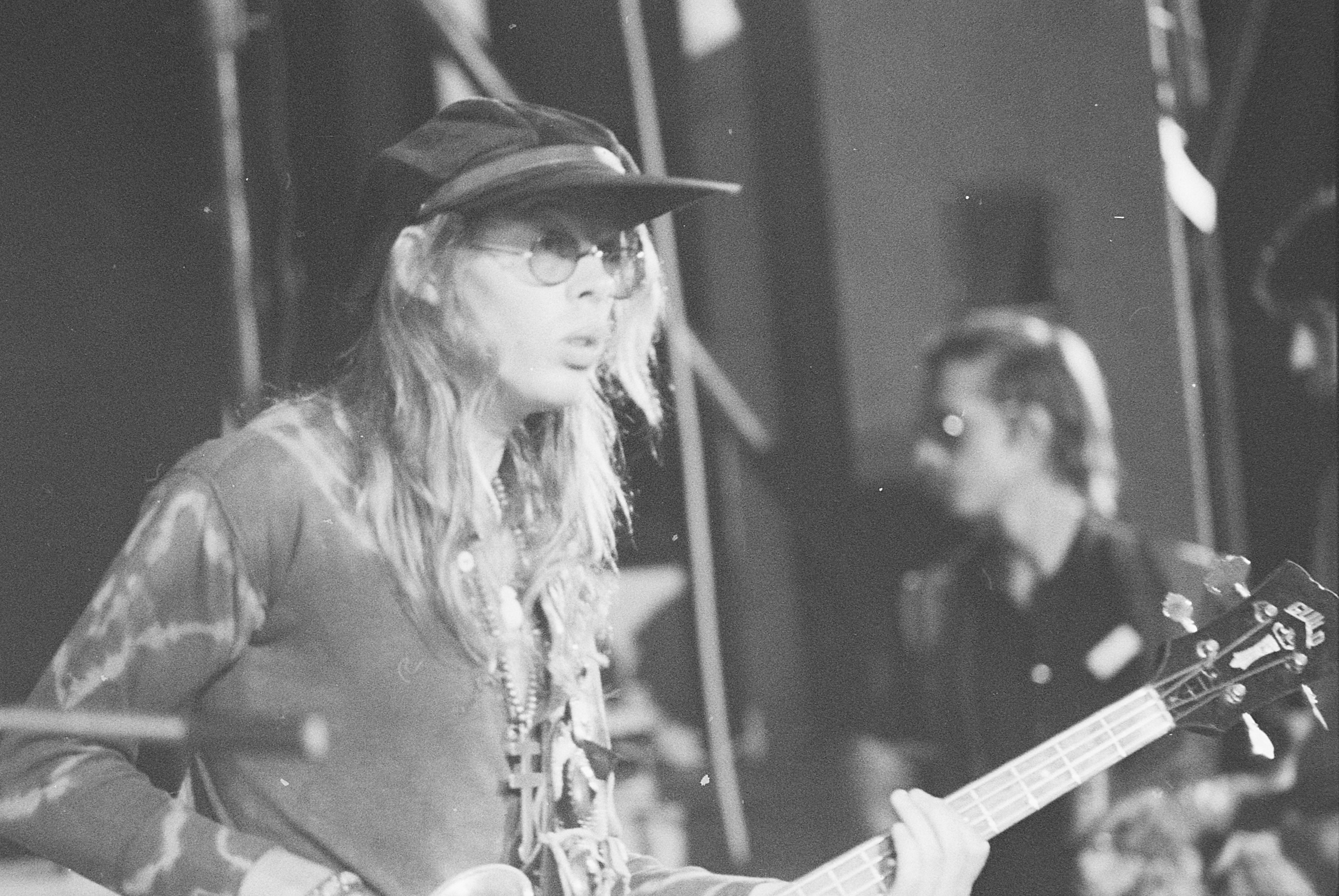
Casady in Kralingen (1970

Casady became the bass player for Jefferson Airplane when lead guitarist Jorma Kaukonen, a high school friend and former Triumphs rhythm guitarist, invited him to join in late September 1965. He replaced the band's original bassist Bob Harvey the following month.

Casady stepped beyond the bass guitar's conventional supporting role in rock & roll, in order to explore melodic ideas suggested by the rhythms and chord progressions. His impact was immediately evident on Airplane's debut album Jefferson Airplane Takes Off (1966), on tracks such as "Let Me In" and "Run Around".

The Takes Off LP quotes Marty Balin as saying "He carries it. He's been with James Brown and other groups and he knows." There is, however, no evidence Casady had ever played with James Brown. The live Airplane album Bless Its Pointed Little Head, recorded in 1968, demonstrates Casady's unique walking line style to the fullest, as his Guild Starfire bass signal went through a Versatone amplifier, which produced a distinctive growling sound when the instrument was played in a high register. The Fred Neil track "The Other Side of This Life" remains a quintessential example of his style. On later Airplane albums, such as Bark, Long John Silver and the live Thirty Seconds Over Winterland, Casady switched over to a $4,000 custom-made Alembic bass (No. 001, the first made by the company).

Other noteworthy Casady performances on Jefferson Airplane recordings include the Top 10 hit "White Rabbit" (on the album Surrealistic Pillow, 1967), "Rejoyce" and "Watch Her Ride" (After Bathing at Baxter's, 1967), "Crown of Creation", "If You Feel" and "The House at Pooneil Corners" (Crown of Creation, 1968), "Crazy Miranda" and "War Movie" (Bark, 1971), and the co-written composition "Long John Silver" (Long John Silver, 1972). Several of these tracks are remarkable for their infusions of jazz and raga bass lines into a rock format. For years in live performance with the Airplane, Casady's showcase was the Paul Kantner composition "The Ballad of You and Me and Pooneil", which gave the bassist the opportunity to improvize an open-ended solo that was different every night and often astonishing. The Fly Jefferson Airplane DVD includes one such performance videotaped at The Family Dog, where Casady pulls off a solo that visibly impresses fellow band member Grace Slick. He was likewise adept at complementing the musicianship of his fellow players; the live version of "Volunteers" on the Woodstock album is a notable example of cooperating bass and keyboard rhythm with session pianist Nicky Hopkins.

Casady's appetite for playing led him to do extensive moonlighting during his Airplane tenure. Not only did he perform live on stage with Jimi Hendrix during 1968, he also played bass on the Jimi Hendrix song "Voodoo Chile", from the Electric Ladyland album released in the same year (some copies of the album misspell his name as Cassidy). He also occasionally played with other key San Francisco bands Grateful Dead, Country Joe and the Fish, and James and the Good Brothers. Furthermore, he was a member of two short-lived splinter groups, Mickey and the Heartbeats (with Jerry Garcia and Mickey Hart) and Jack Casady and the Degenerates, an ensemble that included teenage friend Danny Gatton alongside Kaukonen. Neither of these groups ever recorded, though live tapes are in circulation. Later, Casady was to appear on David Crosby's If I Could Only Remember My Name (1971), Roky Erickson's album Don't Slander Me (1982), and Warren Zevon's Transverse City (1989). He also produced Jorma Kaukonen's first solo album, the critically acclaimed Quah, in 1975.

== Hot Tuna ==
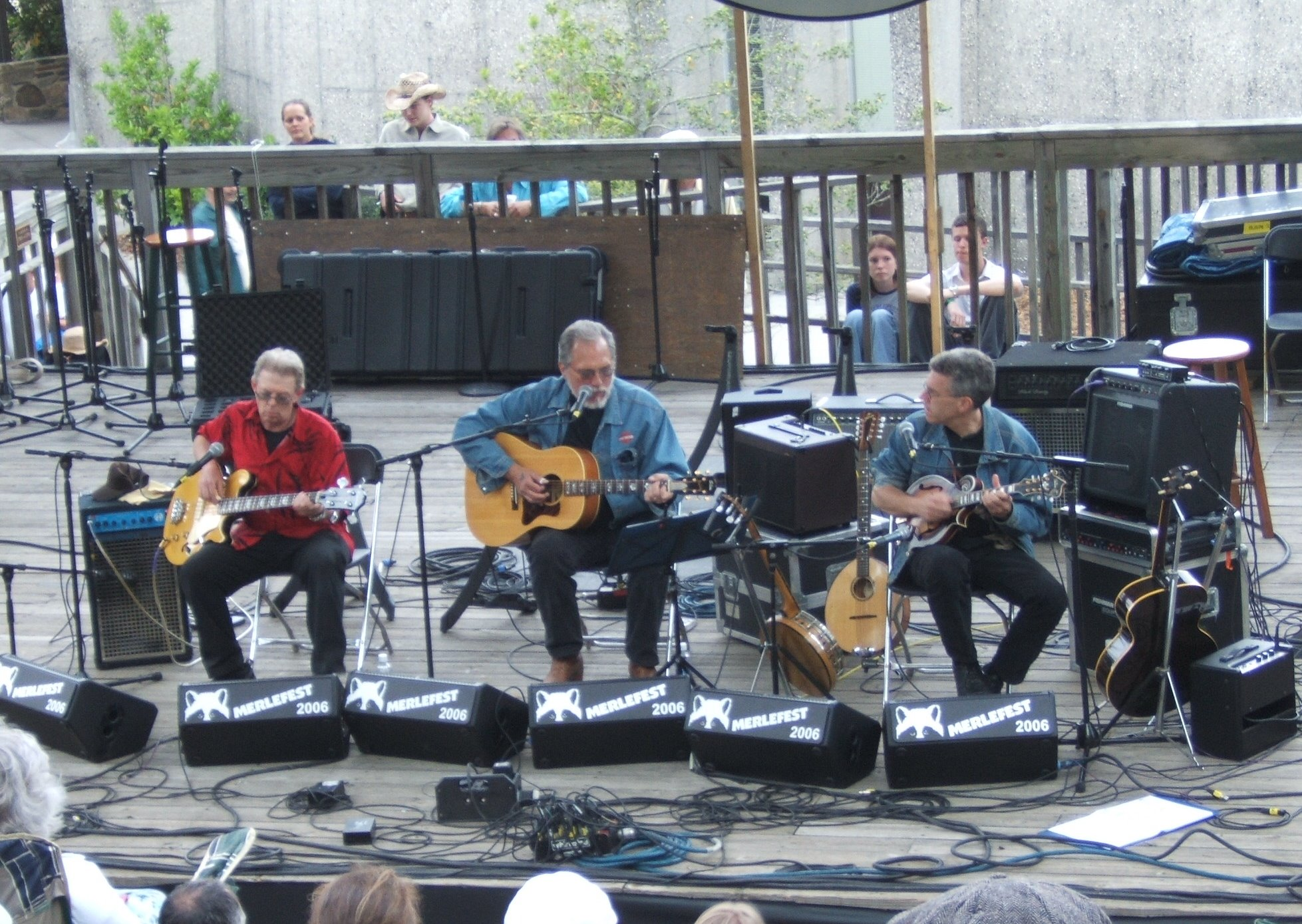
Hot Tuna at Merlefest, 2006. Left to right: Casady, Jorma Kaukonen, and Barry Mitterhoff.

Casady and Kaukonen formed Hot Tuna in 1969, and they still perform to the present day. Over the years, the group changed its style, moving from acoustic blues to electric boogie, heavy metal influences, and later returning to its earlier sound. Casady is equally comfortable accompanying an acoustic Kaukonen ("Mann's Fate", 1970) or electric jamming ("John's Other", 1971). Casady's solo on "Candy Man" (Hot Tuna's First Pull Up, Then Pull Down, 1971) again shows his ability to carry a melody rather than just playing rhythmically and harmonically. Some exquisitely intricate playing is evident on the 1972 album Burgers, particularly the sparkling instrumental track "Water Song", which Casady has described as featuring "lead bass". Another Burgers track, "Sunny Day Strut", has Casady's bass dueling with Kaukonen's lead guitar. When Tuna became a power trio in the mid-1970s, Casady's Guild Flying V custom bass became his trademark. Later works, especially Live in Japan (1997), still testify to his creativity as evidenced by the continually evolving bass solos on "Candy Man", "Good Shepherd" and "99 Year Blues".

== SVT and The Yanks ==
In the late 1970s, Casady and Kaukonen found that they needed some creative time apart, and Hot Tuna disbanded for several years. During this time, Casady helped found a modern rock band, SVT, with Brian Marnell, a promising songwriter and frontman, keyboardist Nick Buck, and drummer Bill Gibson, later replaced by Paul Zahl. Again, Casady's versatility was demonstrated as this band played in a convincing New Wave style, totally removed from Hot Tuna and Jefferson Airplane. During his SVT tenure, Casady actually taped his fingers together to force himself to simplify his highly articulated playing style. He and Zahl formed an exemplary rhythm section, as evidenced on the LP No Regrets (1981). After Marnell's death from a drug overdose Casady and Zahl continued the basic SVT sound with guitarist Jack Johnson and singer/songwriter/guitarist Owen Masterson in a band called The Yanks. Also during the 1980s, Casady joined former Airplane members Paul Kantner and Marty Balin in the KBC Band.

== Jefferson Starship ==
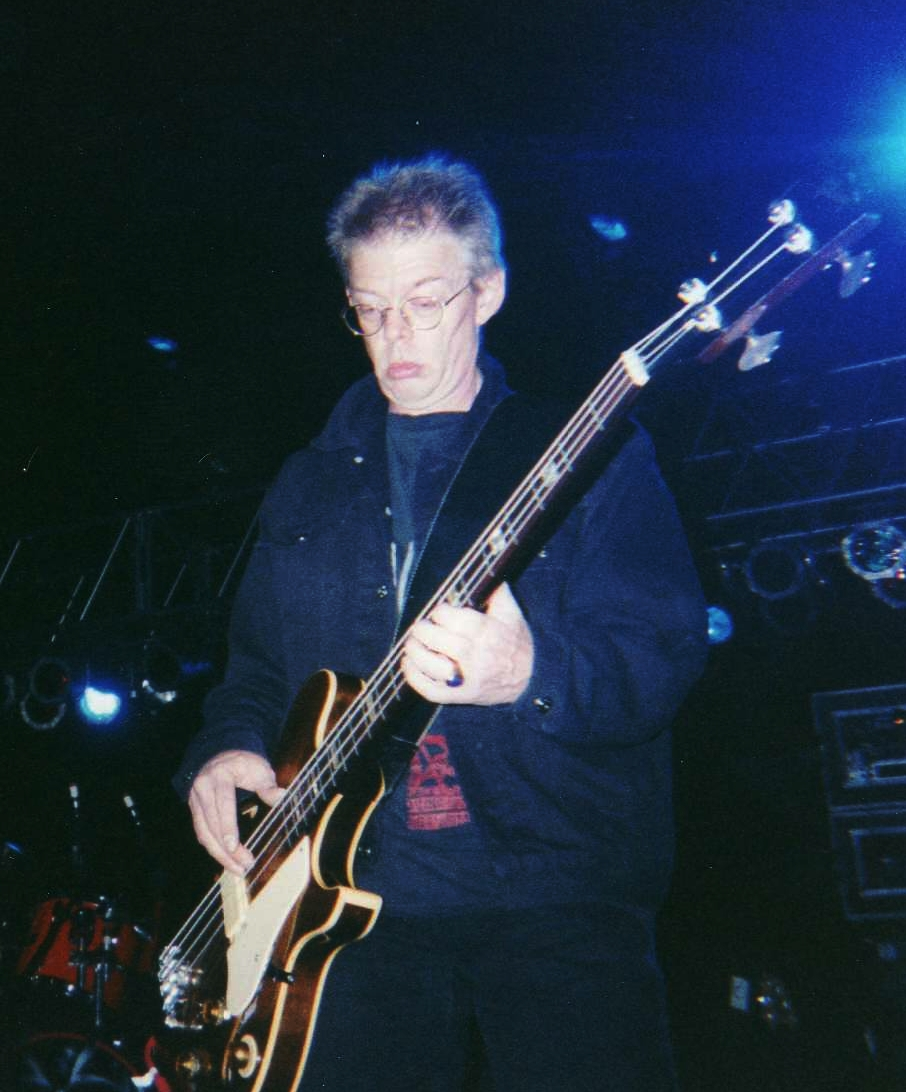
Casady in concert with Jefferson Starship in 1996.

In 1992, he joined Paul Kantner's recreated Jefferson Starship, and appeared on the albums Deep Space / Virgin Sky and Windows of Heaven. In 2000, Kantner used the name Jefferson Airplane against the terms of his 1985 settlement with Grace Slick, Jorma Kaukonen, Bill Thompson, and Casady. Casady left Jefferson Starship after this incident. Casady appears with Kantner again on the 2008 Jefferson Starship release, Jefferson's Tree of Liberty from a track previously recorded for the German release of Windows of Heaven.

== Dream Factor ==
Not a singer and never a prolific songwriter, it was not until June 2003 that Casady released his first solo album, Dream Factor, which he co-produced with Greg Hampton. Like other Airplane-related solo works, it featured substantial support from other players such as Warren Haynes, Doyle Bramhall II, Jorma Kaukonen, Fee Waybill, Ivan Neville, the group Box Set, and many other musician friends.

Currently, as well as performing with Hot Tuna, Casady teaches bass workshops at Jorma Kaukonen's Fur Peace Ranch in Ohio.

Casady helped design, in conjunction with Epiphone, the "Jack Casady Signature Bass", a 34-inch scale hollow-body electric bass with single low-impedance humbucker pickup and a floating bridge. The instrument is based on Casady's mid-1970s Gibson Les Paul Signature bass which he bought in the 1980s.

== Moonalice ==
In 2007, Casady joined a new band, Moonalice, whose members include former Jefferson Starship bassist and Hot Tuna keyboardist Pete Sears, along with G. E. Smith, Barry Sless, Ann McNamee, Roger McNamee, and Jimmy Sanchez. The first Moonalice studio album was released in April 2009.

== Musical approach ==
A bass instructional video has him repeating the word "drama" in regards to his sound/tone. Casady is widely known for the commanding tonal quality of his playing, something that he acknowledges is deliberate. He has remarked that tone is the most essential quality for an electric bassist, stating "Tone is your signature as to who you are... The music builds around the tone. It isn’t just a series of notes or the articulation or the technique. The signature sound of a great musician is his tone and that sets him apart from others."

== Discography ==
Jack Casady

- Dream Factor (2003)

Jefferson Airplane

- Jefferson Airplane Takes Off (1966)
- Surrealistic Pillow (1967)
- After Bathing at Baxter's (1967)
- Crown of Creation (1968)
- Bless Its Pointed Little Head (1969)
- Volunteers (1969)
- Bark (1971)
- Long John Silver (1972)
- Thirty Seconds Over Winterland (1973)
- Jefferson Airplane (1989)
- Live at the Fillmore East (1998)
- Sweeping Up the Spotlight (2007)
- The Woodstock Experience (2009)

Hot Tuna

- Hot Tuna (1970)
- First Pull Up, Then Pull Down (1971)
- Burgers (1972)
- The Phosphorescent Rat (1974)
- America's Choice (1975)
- Yellow Fever (1975)
- Hoppkorv (1976)
- Double Dose (1978)
- Pair a Dice Found (1990)
- Live at Sweetwater (1992)
- Live at Sweetwater Two (1993)
- Live in Japan (1997)
- And Furthurmore... (1999)
- Steady as She Goes (2011)
- Bear's Sonic Journals: Before We Were Them (2019)

Jefferson Starship

- Deep Space/Virgin Sky (1995)
- Windows of Heaven (1999)

Moonalice

- Moonalice (2009)

Michael Falzarano

- A Kaleidoscope Christmas (2020)
