= Burgers (album) =

Studio album by Hot Tuna
- Released: February 1972
- Recorded: November–December 1971 at Wally Heider Studios, San Francisco
- Genre: Folk rock, blues rock
- Length: 37:21
- Label: Grunt
- Producer: Jorma Kaukonen

Hot Tuna chronology
First Pull Up, Then Pull Down (1971)	Burgers (1972)	The Phosphorescent Rat (1973)

Professional ratings
Review scores
Source	Rating
Allmusic	4/5 stars
Rolling Stone	(not rated)
Encyclopedia of Popular Music	4/5 stars

Burgers is the third album by Hot Tuna, the folk rock offshoot of Jefferson Airplane members Jorma Kaukonen, Jack Casady, and Papa John Creach, released in 1972 as Grunt FTR-1004. It was the band's first studio album, the previous two being live recordings. "Water Song" and "Sunny Day Strut" are instrumentals composed for this album. In 1996, RCA released the CD box set Hot Tuna in a Can which included a remastered version of this album, along with remasters of the albums Hot Tuna, First Pull Up, Then Pull Down, America's Choice and Hoppkorv.

It was voted number 748 in the third edition of Colin Larkin's All Time Top 1000 Albums (2000).

== Track listing ==
Side one
No.	Title	Writer(s)	Length
1.	"True Religion"	Jorma Kaukonen	4:42
2.	"Highway Song"	Kaukonen	3:14
3.	"99 Year Blues"	Julius Daniels	3:58
4.	"Sea Child"	Kaukonen	5:00

Side two
No.	Title	Writer(s)	Length
1.	"Keep On Truckin'"	Blind Boy Fuller	3:40
2.	"Water Song" (instrumental)	Kaukonen	5:17
3.	"Ode for Billy Dean"	Kaukonen	4:49
4.	"Let Us Get Together Right Down Here"	Rev. Gary Davis	3:27
5.	"Sunny Day Strut" (instrumental)	Kaukonen	3:14

== Personnel ==
- Jorma Kaukonen – guitars, lead vocals
- Jack Casady – bass, vocals, eyebrow
- Papa John Creach – violin, vocals
- Sammy Piazza – drums, tympani, other percussion, vocals

=== Additional personnel ===
- Nick Buck – organ, piano on "True Religion" and "Keep On Truckin'"
- Richmond Talbott – vocals, slide guitar on "99 Year Blues"
- David Crosby – vocals on "Highway Song"

=== Production ===
- The Unknown Engineer (Joe Lopes) – recording engineer
- The Masked Mixer – mixer
- Betty Cantor – mixer
- Bruce Steinberg – design, photography
- Allen Zentz – assistant engineer
- The Mighty Maurice (Pat Ieraci) – assistant engineer
- Recorded at Wally Heider Studios, San Francisco
- A Fishobaby Production
- Reissue Liner Notes: William Ruhlmann
