= Jorma Kaukonen =

American guitarist (born 1940)

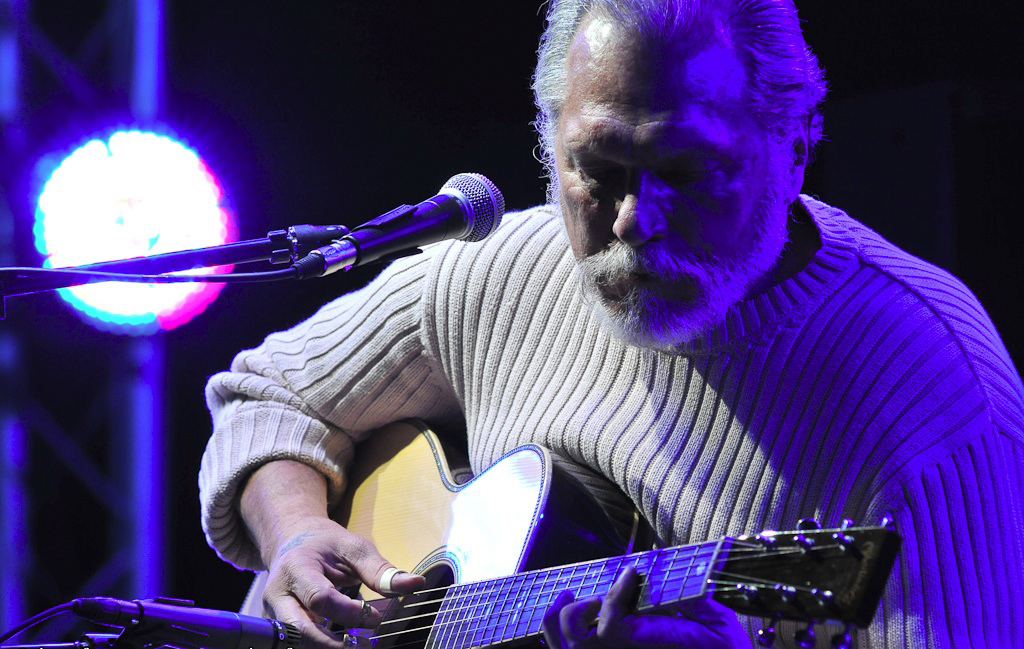
- Kaukonen performing in 2009

Background information
- Born: Jorma Ludwik Kaukonen Jr. December 23, 1940 (age 85); Washington, D.C., U.S.
- Genres: Rock; blues; folk; psychedelic rock
- Occupations: Musician; songwriter
- Instruments: Guitar; vocals
- Years active: 1964–present
- Labels: Relix; RCA; Grunt; Red House; Atlantic; Virgin
- Website: jormakaukonen.com

Jorma Ludwik Kaukonen Jr. (/ˈjɔːrmə ˈkaʊkənɛn/; YOR-mə KOW-kə-nen; born December 23, 1940) is an American blues, folk, and rock guitarist. Kaukonen performed with Jefferson Airplane, and still performs regularly on tour with Hot Tuna, which started as a side project with bassist Jack Casady, and as of 2026 has continued for 55 years. Rolling Stone magazine ranked him No. 54 on its list of "100 Greatest Guitarists". He was inducted into the Rock and Roll Hall of Fame in 1996 as a member of Jefferson Airplane.

== Early life and education ==
Jorma Ludwik Kaukonen Jr. was born on December 23, 1940, in Washington, D.C., to Beatrice Love (née Levine) and Jorma Ludwik Kaukonen Sr. He had Finnish paternal grandparents and Russian Jewish ancestry on his mother's side. He is the older brother of fellow musician Peter Kaukonen. During his childhood, the Kaukonen family lived in Pakistan, the Philippines, and other locales as they followed his father's State Department career from assignment to assignment before returning to the place of his birth. In Pakistan, he attended Karachi Grammar School. As a teenager in Washington, D.C., he and friend Jack Casady formed a band called the Triumphs, with Kaukonen on rhythm guitar and Casady on lead.

Kaukonen attended Antioch College in Yellow Springs, Ohio, where his friend Ian Buchanan taught him fingerstyle guitar playing. Buchanan also introduced Kaukonen to the music of Reverend Gary Davis, whose songs have remained important parts of Kaukonen's repertoire throughout his career.

In 1962, Kaukonen moved to the San Francisco Bay Area and enrolled at the University of Santa Clara. During this time, he gave guitar lessons at Benner Music Company in San Jose. He played as a solo act in coffee houses and accompanied Janis Joplin on acoustic guitar on the 1964 recording known as "The Typewriter Tapes" because of the obtrusive sound of Kaukonen's first wife, Margareta, typing in the background.

== Career ==
=== Jefferson Airplane ===
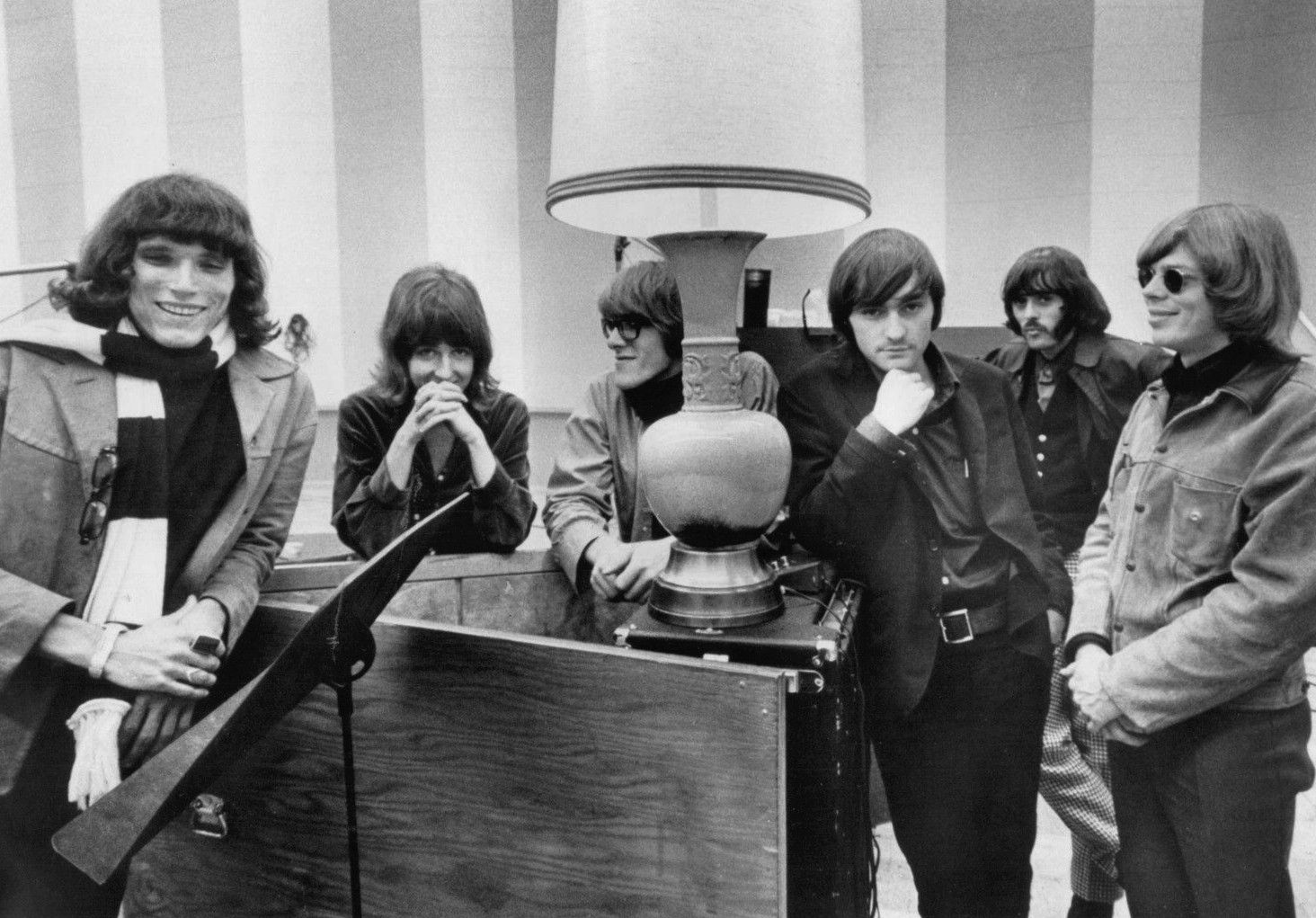
Kaukonen (far left) with Jefferson Airplane ca. 1967

In 1965, his friend Bob Kinzie introduced Kaukonen to a former Santa Clara student, Paul Kantner, who invited Kaukonen to join a band he was forming with Marty Balin. As a self-described country blues purist, Kaukonen was initially reluctant, but found his imagination excited by the arsenal of effects available to electric guitar, later remarking that he was "sucked in" by technology. With the group still looking for a name, Kaukonen suggested the name Jefferson Airplane, inspired by an eccentric friend who had given his dog the name "Blind Lemon Jefferson Airplane". When their original bass player was fired, Kaukonen recommended his friend Casady (who still lived in Washington, DC, at the time) as a replacement.

Though never a prolific singer or songwriter during his tenure with Jefferson Airplane, Kaukonen contributed notable material to each of the group's albums, including the instrumental "Embryonic Journey"; arrangements of the traditional "Good Shepherd" and B.B. King's "Rock Me Baby"; "Third Week in the Chelsea", which detailed his feelings about the disintegration of the band; and "Trial by Fire"—all of which he continues to play.

=== Hot Tuna ===
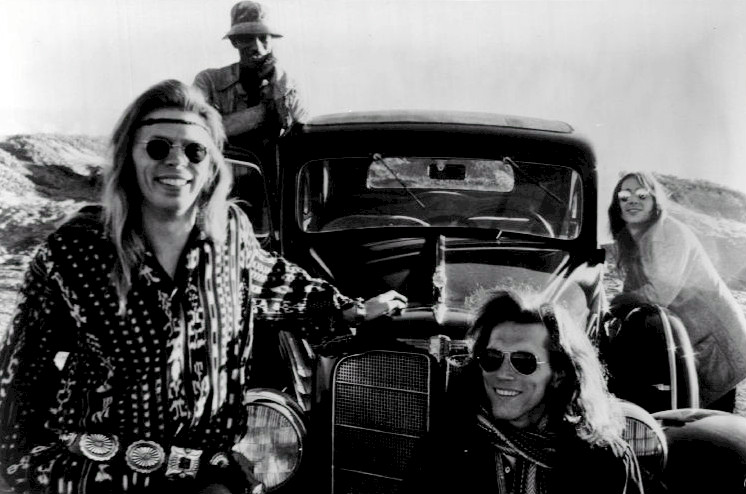
Kaukonen (front, right) with Hot Tuna in March 1972

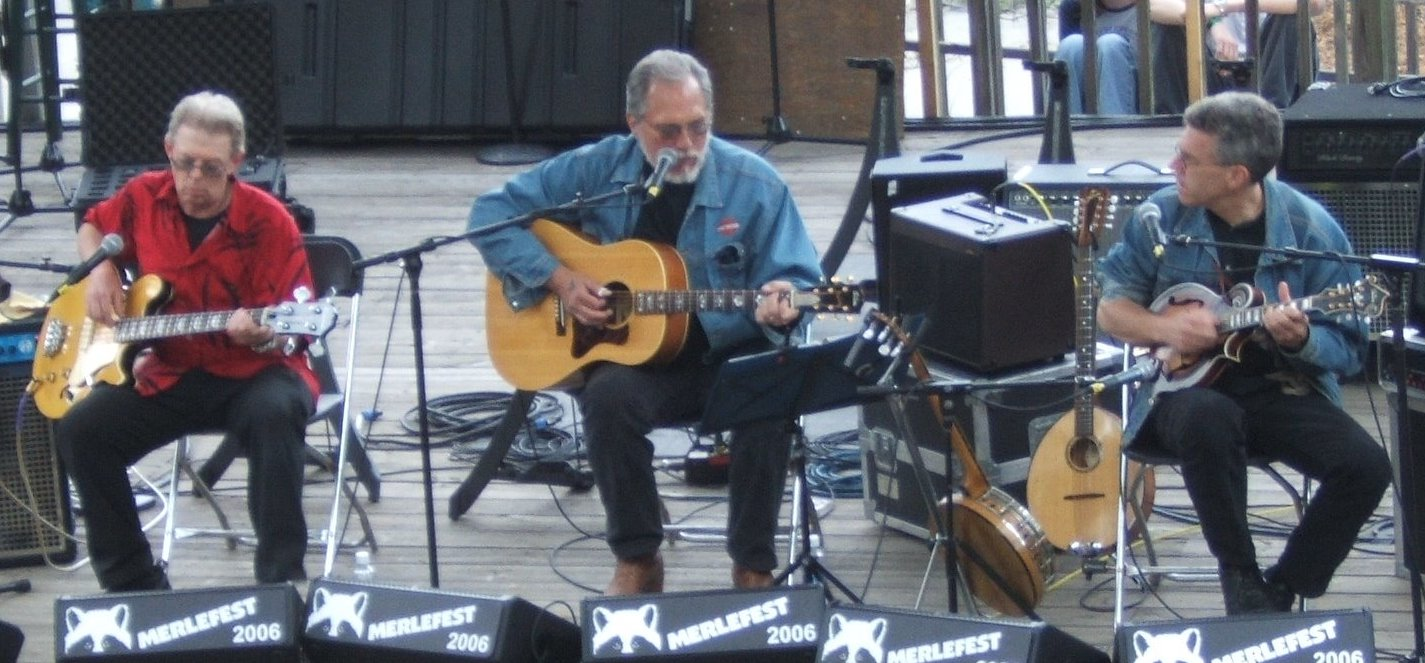
Hot Tuna at MerleFest in Wilkesboro, North Carolina in April 2006. Left to right: Jack Casady, Kaukonen, and Barry Mitterhoff

In 1969–70, Jorma Kaukonen and Jack Casady formed Hot Tuna, a spinoff group that allowed them to play as long as they liked. An early incarnation of Hot Tuna included Jefferson Airplane vocalist Marty Balin, Kaukonen's younger brother Peter on rhythm guitar, and Joey Covington on drums and vocals. This grouping (which came to include guitarist Paul Ziegler after the younger Kaukonen's departure) came to an end after an unsuccessful recording jaunt in Jamaica, the sessions of which have never been released. A concurrent semi-acoustic configuration (including Kaukonen, Casady on electric bass and harmonica player Will Scarlett) enabled the guitarist to show off his Piedmont-style acoustic blues fingerpicking skills. The group's self-titled first album was a September 1969 live recording of this ensemble. Amid the gradual dissolution of Jefferson Airplane from 1971 to 1973, Hot Tuna went electric in earnest, with fiddler Papa John Creach joining for the next two albums. Hot Tuna scored an FM radio hit with "Ja Da (Keep on Truckin')" from their third (and first studio) album, Burgers. At this time, Kaukonen's songwriting began to dominate, as further evidenced by the next album, The Phosphorescent Rat, which featured only one cover song.

Beginning with their fifth album, America's Choice (1975), the addition of drummer Bob Steeler encouraged a rise in volume and a change of band personality—a rampaging, Cream-like rock with often quasimystical lyrics by Kaukonen. During this period, the trio was known for their very long live sets and instrumental jamming. Hot Tuna toured extensively throughout the 1970s across the United States and Europe. The band's first phase of activity concluded in 1978 following their breakup, marking the end of their initial period as a touring and recording group. Casady left to form the new wave band SVT, while Kaukonen played as a solo act at venues that had been booked for Hot Tuna's cancelled 1978 tour.

=== Solo ===
Kaukonen had begun his solo career several years prior to the breakup, when he recorded the 1974 album Quah. Produced by Jack Casady, Quah featured string overdubs on some tracks, as well as several tracks written and sung by Kaukonen's friend Tom Hobson. The opening track "Genesis" was featured in the films Margot at the Wedding (2007) and Transcendence (2014).

In 1979, Kaukonen released his second solo album, Jorma. Later that year, he began touring with a number of bass/drum combinations (first known as "Hidden Klitz", then as "White Gland", and finally as "Vital Parts"), which initially included Hot Tuna drummer Bob Steeler. During this time, he experimented with a new image, with short, dyed hair and extensive tattoos adorning his body, back, and arms. He recorded the album Barbeque King, which was released in 1980. Kaukonen's traditional fan base did not warm to this new "punk" image, and sales of the album were so disappointing that he was soon dropped from RCA Records.

He continued playing as a solo artist throughout the 1980s at venues such as The Chestnut Cabaret in Philadelphia, The Capitol Theater in Passaic, New Jersey, and in Port Chester, New York. As in his Hot Tuna days, he played very long sets, usually beginning with an hour-long acoustic set followed by a long intermission and then a two-hour electric set, sometimes accompanied by bass and drums.

In 1984, Kaukonen appeared on Robert Hunter's Amagamalin Street. This was the third album released by Relix Records, a label founded by Les Kippel that specialized in bands from the San Francisco Bay Area. Relix also released Splashdown, featuring a rare performance by Hot Tuna on WQIV, a now-defunct radio station in New York. Kippel was instrumental in reuniting Kaukonen and Casady in 1985 for a Hot Tuna theater tour. Relix Records remained Hot Tuna's record label until 2000, and also released Classic Hot Tuna Acoustic, Classic Hot Tuna Electric, Live at Sweetwater, and Live at Sweetwater Two.

In 1985, Kaukonen performed with the band There Goes the Neighborhood with Jaco Pastorius (bass), Doug McClean (harmonica), Whitie Melvin (percussion), Ben Prevo (guitar), and Rashied Ali (congas).

Having briefly reformed for a tour in 1983 that closed with a farewell show at Jonathan Swift's in Cambridge, Massachusetts, Hot Tuna again reformed in 1986.

At a 1988 Hot Tuna performance at The Fillmore, Kaukonen surprised fellow Jefferson Airplane alumnus Paul Kantner (who was sitting in with the band) with an appearance by his estranged lover Grace Slick. The success of this performance helped to pave the way for a Jefferson Airplane reunion tour and record in 1989.

In 1993, he collaborated with ex-Grateful Dead keyboardist Tom Constanten in recording numerous arrangements of "Embryonic Journey". The resulting tracks were released as Embryonic Journey, the album, in 1994 on the Relix label. In 1999, he played several gigs with Phil Lesh and Friends. In 2000, he appeared with jam band Widespread Panic during their summer tour. His 2002 album Blue Country Heart was nominated for a Grammy Award.

With his wife Vanessa, Kaukonen currently owns and operates the Fur Peace Ranch, a 119-acre (0.48 km^{2}) music and guitar camp in the hills of southeast Ohio, north of Pomeroy, complete with a 32-track studio. He is currently under contract as a solo artist to Red House Records, and still records and tours with Jack Casady and other friends — such as Barry Mitterhoff — as Hot Tuna.

On August 28, 2018, St. Martin's Press published Kaukonen's autobiography, Been So Long: My Life and Music.

== Personal life ==
Kaukonen married his first wife, Lena "Margareta" Pettersson (September 23, 1943 – December 28, 1997), in January 1964. They divorced in 1983. He met his second wife, Vanessa, in Key West, Florida, on July 3, 1988; they married on December 7 of that year. Kaukonen has a son, Zachary (born September 6, 1997), whose mother was Stephanie Kearse, and an adopted daughter, Izze.

== Equipment ==
As a member of Jefferson Airplane, Kaukonen's primary guitar was a Gibson ES-345, noted for the visible Varitone dial on the guitar and the signature 345 logo on the headstock. Kaukonen presently endorses Martin Guitars. In 2010, Martin Guitars released the Martin M-30 Jorma Kaukonen Custom Artist Edition. This guitar was designed by Kaukonen and Martin's Dick Boak, using ideas from two Martin guitars that he had previously been playing – a David Bromberg Custom Artist Edition and a prototype model that Kaukonen called an "M-5."

Epiphone released a Jorma Kaukonen signature model Riviera guitar in 2002. Kaukonen also uses and endorses the Fishman Loudbox amp. Jorma currently plays Flammang Acoustic Guitars, build by Luthier David Flammang in Iowa.

== Discography ==
Studio albums

- Quah (with Tom Hobson) (1974)
- Jorma (1979)
- Barbeque King (with Vital Parts) (1981)
- Too Hot to Handle (1985)
- Embryonic Journey (with Tom Constanten) (1994)
- The Land of Heroes (1995)
- Christmas (1996)
- Too Many Years (1998)
- Blue Country Heart (2002)
- Stars in My Crown (2007)
- River of Time (2009)
- Ain't In No Hurry (2015)
- The River Flows (with John Hurlbut) (2020)
- The River Flows Volume Two (with John Hurlbut) (2021)

Live albums

- Magic (1985)
- Magic Two (1995)
- Jorma Kaukonen Trio Live (2001)
- The Legendary Typewriter Tape: 6/25/64 Jorma's House (with Janis Joplin) (2022)
- Reno Road (2024)
- Wabash Avenue (2025)
