= Magic Two =

Live album by Jorma Kaukonen
- Released: 1995
- Recorded: December 8–9, 1984
- Venue: Cubby Bear Lounge, Chicago
- Label: Relix Records
- Producer: Leslie D. Kippel; Michael Falzarano (assoc.)

Jorma Kaukonen chronology
Embryonic Journey (1994)	Magic Two (1995)	The Land of Heroes (1995)

Professional ratings
Review scores
Source	Rating
Allmusic	3/5 stars

Magic Two is an expanded re-release of the live Jorma Kaukonen album, Magic, containing performances of acoustic songs recorded during his solo tour in 1984. After Hot Tuna had released two new live albums in the early 1990s on Relix Records (Live at Sweetwater and Live at Sweetwater Two), Michael Falzarano remastered and produced new versions of the previous vinyl releases Kaukonen had made for Relix in the 1980s. Magic Two was the first remastered release.

== Track listing ==
1. "Walkin' Blues" (Robert Johnson) – 4:02
2. "Winin' Boy Blues" (Jelly Roll Morton) – 5:48
3. "I'll Be Alright" (Traditional) – 3:34
4. "Embryonic Journey" (Jorma Kaukonen) – 2:12
5. "Broken Highway" (Kaukonen) – 4:13
6. "Candy Man" (Rev. Gary Davis) – 3:11
7. "Follow the Drinking Gourd" (Traditional) – 3:26
8. "Rock Me Baby" (Traditional) – 4:29
9. "Another Man Done Gone" (Ruby Pickens Tart, Vera Hall, John Lomax, Alan Lomax) – 4:43
10. "Roads and Roads &" (Kaukonen) – 5:08
11. "Good Shepherd" (Traditional) – 4:23
12. "Police Dog Blues" (Blind Blake) – 4:03
13. "Come Back Baby" (Lightning Hopkins) – 5:23
14. "Mann's Fate" (Kaukonen) – 6:12

== Personnel ==
- Jorma Kaukonen – acoustic guitar, vocals

=== Production ===
- Leslie D. Kippel – producer, photography
- Michael Falzarano – associate producer, remastering
- Ebet Roberts – photography
