= Magic (Jorma Kaukonen album) =

Live album by Jorma Kaukonen
- Released: 1985
- Recorded: December 8–9, 1984 at Cubby Bear Lounge, Chicago
- Label: Relix Records
- Producer: Leslie D. Kippel

Jorma Kaukonen chronology
Too Hot to Handle (1985)	Magic (1985)	Embryonic Journey (1994)

Magic is a live Jorma Kaukonen album containing performances of acoustic songs from Jefferson Airplane and Hot Tuna albums recorded during his solo tour of 1984. After a brief reunion tour in 1983 with Hot Tuna, Jorma had continued to play solo and eventually landed a contract with Relix Records. In addition to releasing Kaukonen's new solo recordings, Relix also released live Hot Tuna recordings from the 1970s, with the albums Splashdown and Historic Live Tuna. In 1995, Michael Falzarano remastered the album and produced a new version that Relix released as the CD Magic Two.

It was given a three-star rating by AllMusic.

== Track listing ==
=== Side A ===
1. "Walkin' Blues" (Robert Johnson) – 4:03
2. "Winin' Boy Blues" (Jelly Roll Morton) – 5:49
3. "I'll Be Alright" (Traditional) – 3:35
4. "Embryonic Journey" (Jorma Kaukonen) – 2:11

=== Side B ===
1. "Candy Man" (Rev. Gary Davis) – 3:13
2. "Roads and Roads &" (Kaukonen) – 5:09
3. "Good Shepherd" (Traditional) – 4:25
4. "Mann's Fate" (Kaukonen) – 6:16

== Personnel ==
- Jorma Kaukonen – acoustic guitar, vocals

=== Production ===
- Leslie D. Kippel – producer
- Toni Brown – liner notes
- Maureen Hunter – artwork
- Special Thanks to Netta Gilboa and Craig OLeary for the recording.
