= Splashdown Two =

Live album by Hot Tuna
- Released: 1997
- Recorded: July 24, 1975
- Studio: WQIV-FM (New York City)
- Genre: Blues rock
- Label: Relix Records
- Producer: Michael Falzarano; Leslie D. Kippel (executive)

Hot Tuna chronology
Classic Hot Tuna Electric (1996)	Splashdown Two (1997)	Live in Japan (1997)

Splashdown Two is a 1997 CD release and expansion of the previous Hot Tuna vinyl release from 1984, Splashdown. It is a recording of a live acoustic performance from the mid-1970s that had played on the short-lived radio station WQIV.

== Track listing ==
1. "Oh Lord, Search My Heart" (Rev. Gary Davis) – 5:14
2. "Death Don't Have No Mercy" (Davis) – 6:48
3. "I Am the Light of This World" (Davis) – 4:02
4. "Mann's Fate" (Jorma Kaukonen) – 7:00
5. "Winin' Boy Blues" (Jelly Roll Morton) – 6:54
6. "Embryonic Journey" (Jorma Kaukonen) – 2:10
7. "99 Year Blues" (Julius Daniels) – 5:17
8. "Police Dog (Splashdown) Blues" (Blind Blake) – 4:17
9. "Sally Where'd You Get Your Liquor From" (Davis) – 4:16
10. "Keep Your Lamps Trimmed and Burning" (Davis) – 3:09
11. "I Know You Rider" (Traditional) – 5:15
12. "I Want You to Know" (Bo Carter) – 4:12
13. "Keep On Truckin'" (Bob Carleton) – 4:21
14. "Candy Man" (Davis) – 6:22

== Personnel ==
- Jorma Kaukonen – acoustic guitar, vocals
- Jack Casady – bass

=== Production ===
- Michael Falzarano – producer, remastering
- Leslie D. Kippel – executive producer
- Frank Pappito – engineer
- Toni Brown – liner notes
- Barry Glassberg – tape archivist
- Arthur L. Field – photography
