= Jorma Kaukonen Trio Live =

Too Many Years

Live album by Jorma Kaukonen
- Released: 2001
- Recorded: 1999
- Label: Relix Records
- Producer: Michael Falzarano

Jorma Kaukonen chronology
Too Many Years (1998)	Too Many Years (2001)	Blue Country Heart (2002)

Jorma Kaukonen Trio Live is a live album taken from performances from Jorma Kaukonen's 1999 solo tour, and his last album for Relix Records. Performing with Kaukonen were Michael Falzarano and Pete Sears who had both played on his previous solo album, Too Many Years, and had performed with Hot Tuna on their last release, And Furthermore... After the release of this album, Kaukonen and Jack Casady began to perform as "Jack & Jorma, The Original Acoustic Hot Tuna" and Falzarano and Sears performed less frequently with Hot Tuna and Kaukonen's solo act, with Sears finally leaving in 2001 and Falzarano leaving in 2002.

== Track listing ==
1. "True Religion" (Jorma Kaukonen) – 4:54
2. "How Long Blues" (Leroy Carr) – 4:02
3. "Death Don't Have No Mercy" (Rev. Gary Davis) – 5:47
4. "Do Not Go Gentle" (Kaukonen) – 3:44
5. "I See the Light" (Kaukonen) – 6:05
6. "Embryonic Journey" (Kaukonen) – 2:11
7. "Good Shepherd" (Traditional) – 6:31
8. "San Francisco Bay Blues" (Jesse Fuller) – 3:48
9. "I Know You Rider" (Traditional) – 5:07
10. "Just My Way" (Michael Falzarano) – 9:12
11. "Friend of the Devil" (Jerry Garcia, Robert Hunter, John Dawson) – 6:03

== Personnel ==
- Jorma Kaukonen – guitars, vocals
- Michael Falzarano – rhythm guitar, vocals
- Pete Sears – keyboards

=== Production ===
- Michael Falzarano – producer
- Ralph Marsella – engineer
- Robert Minkin – cover photo
- Recorded live during 1999
