= Jorma =

Jorma can refer to:

- Jorma (name), Finnish given name
- Jorma (album), released by Kaukonen in 1979
