= Sweetwater Saloon =

Bar and music venue in Mill Valley

Coordinates: 37°54′20″N 122°32′56″W

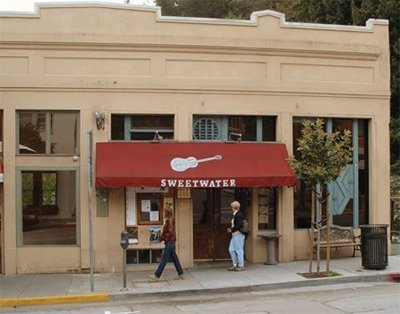
Sweetwater Saloon in 2004; it closed in September 2007.

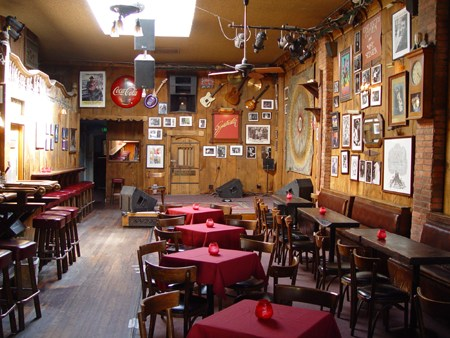
Inside Sweetwater Saloon before opening time, 2004.

Sweetwater Saloon was a bar and music venue located at 153 Throckmorton Avenue Mill Valley, California, with a 30-year history of live musical performances by the likes of Bonnie Raitt, Elvis Costello, Jerry Garcia, The String Cheese Incident, John Lee Hooker and Carlos Santana. There were typically at least 4 to 5 musical acts booked per week making it a popular local hangout. Sweetwater Saloon also featured an open mic night on Mondays that occasionally featured surprise performances by well-known artists such as Gregg Allman, Train and others. Village Music, a nationally recognized independent record store also in Mill Valley held twice-yearly parties at Sweetwater by well-known musicians who were also Village Music store customers. A documentary film about Village Music, Sweetwater and the music community in Mill Valley,Village Music: Last of the Great Record Stores was released in 2012. After closing in 2007 it was reopened as Sweetwater Music Hall in 2012 by Bob Weir and his partners a few blocks away from its original location

== History ==
Jeanie Patterson and her then-husband, Jay took over the Sweetwater Saloon in 1979. Jeanie Patterson retired as the owner on December 31, 1998, by selling it to Becky and Thomas J. Steere, an Autodesk project director. This original Sweetwater closed in 2007. In January, 2012 it was relocated to the Masonic Lodge across from Mill Valley’s City Hall.

Former Grateful Dead guitarist Bob Weir, one of the investors in the new state-of-the-art venue at 19 Corte Madera Ave said,

“For years, Sweetwater was the place many of us local and visiting musicians headed to when we were looking to play for fun, Well, our clubhouse is back — and it belongs to all of us. Woo-hoo — Mill Valley finally has its playpen back!””

== Documentary ==
Village Music: Last of the Great Record Stores, a documentary film by Gillian Grisman and Monroe Grisman (daughter and son of San Francisco Bay Area musician David Grisman) debuted at the Mill Valley Film Festival in October 2012. John Goddard, the owner of Village Music held twice-yearly parties at the nearby Sweetwater Saloon and invited his favorite blues and R&B performers to perform in front of packed invite-only guests. The concert film documents Village Music, Sweetwater, and the music community in Mill Valley in the late 60s through the closing of Village Music record store in 2007 and contains performances by Elvis Costello, Bob Weir, Ry Cooder, Nick Lowe, John Sebastian, Dan Hicks, Huey Lewis, Bonnie Raitt, John Lee Hooker, Pop Staples, Jerry Garcia, and Carlos Santana with many performances at Sweetwater.

== Recordings ==
The band Hot Tuna recorded two live albums at Sweetwater in 1992 Live at Sweetwater, and Live at Sweetwater Two, featuring guest performances by local figures Bob Weir and Wavy Gravy.

BBC Television shot a documentary at the club on January 7, 1992 featuring John Lee Hooker, Bonnie Raitt and Ry Cooder.

== Eviction ==
In 2004, the establishment faced eviction by landlords who raised the rent to more than what the owners claimed they could pay. It was not disputed that the new rent was fair, and the owners of the Sweetwater entered into a month-to-month lease.

In September 2007 Sweetwater closed because the landlord of the building found it necessary to renovate the somewhat run-down property and declined to offer the club terms for a new lease after the renovation's anticipated completion. The owners of the building were also the longtime owners of a very popular Italian restaurant next door that had been established in the 1960s. A spokesman for the family that owned the building and restaurant said at the time that the building would undergo long-overdue repairs and maintenance and that the new Sweetwater owners knew about renovation plans since their lease had expired two years previously. "We've been in this community for 45 years," he said. "If we wanted to throw the Sweetwater out, we would have done it a long time ago.".

== Relocated ==
Becky and Thom Steere, the owners of Sweetwater in Mill Valley began operating the 100-seat cabaret-dinner theater Larkspur Cafe Theatre on July 1, 2007.

On Saturday, January 21, 2012, four years and four months after the original Sweetwater ceased operations, it reopened as Sweetwater Music Hall, owned and operated by a new management and investor group and located in the recently renovated lower floor of Mill Valley's Masonic Temple (opposite Mill Valley's City Hall), held its inaugural music event, a "trade only" party featuring local musician Austin De Lone's band with guest performers including Jerry Harrison (local resident and former lead guitarist for Talking Heads). The new Sweetwater Music Hall includes a full-service restaurant and on-site catering service.

Sweetwater Music Hall is a nonprofit arts organization, with Maria Hoppe, executive director and Bill Getty, chair of a seven-person advisory board.

== See also ==
- Live at Sweetwater, a live Hot Tuna album recorded in 1992
- Live at Sweetwater Two, a live Hot Tuna album recorded in 1992
