= Ain't In No Hurry =

Ain't in No Hurry

Studio album by Jorma Kaukonen
- Released: February 17, 2015
- Genres: Folk, blues
- Length: 46:48
- Label: Red House Records
- Producer: Larry Campbell

Jorma Kaukonen chronology
River of Time (2009)	Ain't in No Hurry (2015)

Ain't in No Hurry is the twelfth solo studio album by Jorma Kaukonen.

== Track listing ==
No.	Title	Writer(s)	Length
1.	"Nobody Knows You When You're Down and Out"	Jimmy Cox	4:11
2.	"The Other Side of the Mountain"	Jorma Kaukonen	4:39
3.	"Suffer Little Children to Come Unto Me"	Larry Campbell, Woody Guthrie, Kaukonen	2:51
4.	"In My Dreams"	Kaukonen	3:23
5.	"Sweet Fern"	A. P. Carter	4:24
6.	"Ain't in No Hurry"	Jim Eagan	3:32
7.	"Brother, Can You Spare a Dime?"	Jay Gorney, Yip Harburg	4:33
8.	"Where There's Two There's Trouble"	Michael Falzarano	3:22
9.	"The Terrible Operation"	Rev. Thomas A. Dorsey	4:17
10.	"Bar Room Crystal Ball"	Kaukonen	7:36
11.	"Seasons in the Field"	Larry Campbell, Kaukonen	4:00

== Personnel ==
- Jorma Kaukonen – guitar, liner notes, vocals

Additional musicians

- Larry Campbell – bass, fiddle, guitar, lap steel guitar, mandolin, pedal steel guitar, production, resonator guitar, vocals
- Jack Casady – bass on "Bar Room Crystal Ball"
- Justin Guip – drums, engineer, mixing
- Myron Hart – bass
- Barry Mitterhoff – mandolin
- Teresa Williams – vocals

Technical personnel

- Scotty Hall – photography
- Vanessa Lillian – photography
- Kevin Morgan – design
