= Embryonic Journey =

Embryonic Journey may refer to:

- Embryonic Journey (album), by Jorma Kaukonen and Tom Constanten, 1994
- "Embryonic Journey" (instrumental), an instrumental piece by Jorma Kaukone of Jefferson Airplane
