= The Worst of Jefferson Airplane =

Greatest hits album by Jefferson Airplane
- Released: November 1970
- Genre: Rock
- Length: 46:11; 52:54 (2006 bonus tracks)
- Label: RCA Victor
- Compilers: Jefferson Airplane, Bill Thompson, Pat Ieraci

Jefferson Airplane chronology
Volunteers (1969)	The Worst of Jefferson Airplane (1970)	Bark (1971)

Professional ratings
Review scores
Source	Rating
Allmusic	4.5/5 stars
Christgau's Record Guide	B+
The Encyclopedia of Popular Music	3/5 stars

The Worst of Jefferson Airplane is the first compilation album from the rock band Jefferson Airplane, released in November 1970 as RCA Victor LSP-4459. The "Worst" in the title is ironic, as the album features all of Jefferson Airplane's hit singles up to that point. It peaked at #12 on the Billboard 200 in 1971 and has since gone platinum.

== Content ==
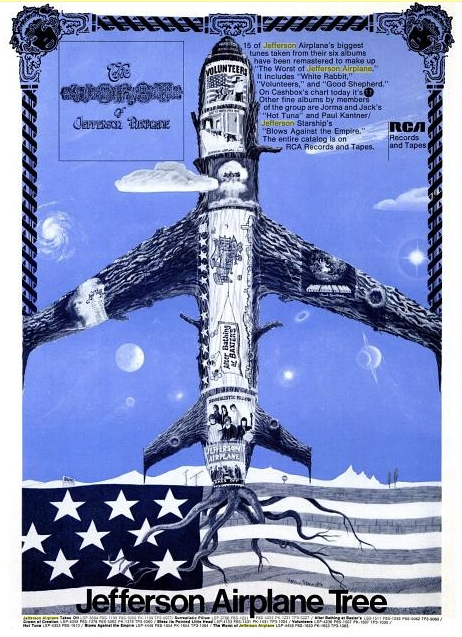
Billboard ad for the album, February 6, 1971.

In 1970, the band underwent a period of inactivity because of internal personnel conflict and pursuit of individual projects. Drummer Spencer Dryden was ousted from the group, Marty Balin found his commitment to the band he had started becoming tenuous, Grace Slick was pregnant with her daughter for a good part of the year, Paul Kantner released his solo album Blows Against the Empire, and Jorma Kaukonen and Jack Casady busied themselves with their side project, Hot Tuna. With no group project in sight, RCA Records assembled this album centered upon the group's hit singles, with input from the band. "The Ballad of You & Me & Pooneil", "Crown of Creation", and "Volunteers" all made the lower reaches of the Billboard Hot 100. "Somebody to Love" and "White Rabbit" were the band's only Top 40 hits, reaching #5 and #8 respectively. To ensure a full picture of the group's musical interests, and possibly to ensure solidarity in the publishing income, the band included instrumentals by Dryden and Kaukonen, a country blues/gospel cover arranged by Kaukonen, and Balin's straightforward ballad "Today". This would be the final album featuring what is considered the "classic" line-up of the band, after Slick and Dryden joined, and before Balin and Dryden left.

Original LP copies of the album featured Victor "scroll" record labels from the late 1920s. The paper inner sleeve was a reproduction of a 1918 vintage Victor record sleeve. The interior of the gatefold cover featured a large color reproduction of the painting "His Master's Voice", the famous RCA Victor trademark. Later reissues of the LP were housed in a regular, non-gatefold cover and did not include the reproduction of the painting nor the 1918 inner sleeve, but the record still bore the vintage Victor labels.

== Reissues ==
On July 29, 1997, RCA reissued a remastered version of Worst on compact disc. On June 6, 2006, RCA reissued the album again, this time with two bonus tracks which had both been released as singles, "Watch Her Ride" and "Greasy Heart".

== Track listing ==
The tracks for side one and side two listed here are those of the original LP. The cassette version features the same songs, but arranged in a different order.

Side one
No.	Title	Writer(s)	Original release	Length
1.	"It's No Secret"	Marty Balin	Jefferson Airplane Takes Off (1966)	2:37
2.	"Blues from an Airplane"	Balin, Skip Spence	Jefferson Airplane Takes Off	2:10
3.	"Somebody to Love"	Darby Slick	Surrealistic Pillow (1967)	2:54
4.	"Today"	Balin, Paul Kantner	Surrealistic Pillow	2:57
5.	"White Rabbit"	Grace Slick	Surrealistic Pillow	2:27
6.	"Embryonic Journey"	Jorma Kaukonen	Surrealistic Pillow	1:51
7.	"Martha"	Kantner	After Bathing at Baxter's (1967)	3:21
8.	"The Ballad of You & Me & Pooneil"	Kantner	After Bathing at Baxter's	4:30

Side two
No.	Title	Writer(s)	Original release	Length
1.	"Crown of Creation"	Kantner	Crown of Creation (1968)	2:53
2.	"Chushingura"	Spencer Dryden	Crown of Creation	1:17
3.	"Lather"	G. Slick	Crown of Creation	2:55
4.	"Plastic Fantastic Lover" (live 1968)	Balin	Bless Its Pointed Little Head (1969)	3:39
5.	"Good Shepherd"	traditional, arranged by Kaukonen	Volunteers (1969)	4:22
6.	"We Can Be Together"	Kantner	Volunteers	5:50
7.	"Volunteers"	Balin, Kantner	Volunteers	2:03

2006 CD bonus tracks
No.	Title	Writer(s)	Original release	Length
9.	"Watch Her Ride"	Kantner	After Bathing at Baxter's	3:16
10.	"Greasy Heart"	G. Slick	Crown of Creation	3:27

Note: CD bonus tracks were inserted after Side one in the track list, with Side two renumbering to tracks 11–17.

== Personnel ==
=== Jefferson Airplane ===
- Marty Balin – vocals, rhythm guitar
- Grace Slick – vocals, piano, organ, recorder on all tracks except "It's No Secret" and "Blues from an Airplane"
- Paul Kantner – vocals, rhythm guitar
- Jorma Kaukonen – lead guitar, vocals
- Jack Casady – bass
- Spencer Dryden – drums, percussion on all tracks except "It's No Secret" and "Blues from an Airplane"
- Signe Anderson – vocals on "It's No Secret" and "Blues from an Airplane"
- Skip Spence – drums on "It's No Secret" and "Blues from an Airplane"

=== Additional personnel ===
- Gary Blackman – nose solo on "Lather"
- Gene Twombly – sound effects on "Lather"
- Nicky Hopkins – piano on "We Can Be Together" and "Volunteers"

== Production and recording details ==
- Jefferson Airplane Takes Off released September 1966, recorded on 3-tracks
- Surrealistic Pillow released February 1967, recorded on 4-tracks
- After Bathing at Baxters released November 1967, recorded on 8-tracks
- Crown of Creation released September 1968, recorded on 8-tracks
- Bless Its Pointed Little Head released February 1969, recorded live on 8-tracks
- Volunteers released November 1969, recorded on 16-tracks
- Alton Kelley, Wes Wilson – album design
- Jefferson Airplane, Bill Thompson, Maurice – album compilation

== Charts ==
Chart (1970–1971)	Peak position
Australian Albums (Kent Music Report)	28
Canada Top Albums/CDs (RPM)	11
US Billboard 200	12

== Certifications ==
Region	Certification	Certified units/sales
United States (RIAA)	Platinum	1,000,000^{^}
^{^} Shipments figures based on certification alone.
