= River of Time (Jorma Kaukonen album) =

Studio album by Jorma Kaukonen
- Released: February 10, 2009
- Recorded: 2009 at Levon Helm Studios, Woodstock, NY
- Genre: Folk, Blues
- Length: 49:28
- Label: Red House Records
- Producer: Larry Campbell

Jorma Kaukonen chronology
Stars in My Crown (2007)	River of Time (2009)	Ain't In No Hurry (2015)

Professional ratings
Review scores
Source	Rating
AllMusic	3.5/5 stars
Crawdaddy!	Favorable
PopMatters	7/10
Sound & Vision	3/4 stars

River of Time is a Jorma Kaukonen studio album released in 2009 and his second on Red House Records. The album reached No. 21 on the Billboard "Top Heatseekers" chart, and has received generally favorable reviews. All new recordings make up the album with a combination of songs that had been previously recorded by Hot Tuna, covers, and new compositions. The album was recorded at Levon Helm's studio, and Helm plays drums on some of the tracks. The title song "River of Time" won the Folk Song of the Year Award.

== Track listing ==
1. "Been So Long" (Jorma Kaukonen) – 3:58
2. "There's a Bright Side Somewhere" (Rev. Gary Davis) – 3:01
3. "Cracks in the Finish" (Kaukonen) – 3:30
4. "Another Man Done a Full Go Round" (Roy Book Binder) – 3:39
5. "Trouble In Mind" (Traditional) – 3:25
6. "Izze's Lullaby" (Kaukonen) – 3:32
7. "More Than My Old Guitar" (Merle Haggard) – 3:45
8. "Nashville Blues" (Alton Delmore, Raybon Delmore) – 3:23
9. "A Walk with Friends" (Kaukonen, Barry Mitterhoff, Larry Campbell) – 4:33
10. "Operator" (Ron McKernan) – 3:48
11. "Preachin on the Old Camp Ground" (Mississippi John Hurt) – 3:48
12. "River of Time" (Kaukonen) – 2:56
13. "Simpler Than I Thought" (Kaukonen) – 6:10

== Personnel ==
- Jorma Kaukonen – guitars, vocals
- Larry Campbell – guitar, baritone guitar, tenor guitar, resophonic guitar, fiddle, dobro, mandolin, cittern, percussion
- Barry Mitterhoff – banjo, mandolin, tenor guitar
- Lincoln Schleifer – bass
- Levon Helm – drums on "Cracks in the Finish" and "Trouble in Mind"
- Teresa Williams – vocals on "More Than My Old Guitar", "Nashville Blues" and "Preachin' on the Old Camp Ground"
- Myron Hart – bass on "More Than My Old Guitar" and "Nashville Blues", vocals on "Preachin' on the Old Camp Ground"
- Justin Guip – drums on "More Than My Old Guitar", "Nashville Blues", and "Operator"

=== Production ===
- Larry Campbell – producer
- Justin Guip – engineer
- David Glasser – mastering
- Recorded and mixed at Levon Helm Studio, Woodstock, NY
- Scott Hall – cover photography
- James Russick Smith – studio photography
- Kevin Morgan Studio – art, design

== Notes ==
- River of Time (CD booklet). Jorma Kaukonen. Saint Paul, Minnesota: Red House Records. 2009. RHR-217.
