= Do Lord Remember Me =

"Do Lord Remember Me" (also known as "Do Lord" or "Oh Do Lord, Oh Do Lord"), Roud 11971, is a 19th-century African-American Spiritual. The origin of the song is lost, however most likely originated in the antebellum African American south.

== Recordings ==
The spiritual has recorded by several notable artists, including:

- Jimmie Strothers
- Mississippi John Hurt
- Johnny Cash
- Polly Johnson
- Hollywood Christian Group
- Heritage Singers
- Blind Melon
