= Ja-Da =

Song written & published in 1918

1918 sheet music

"Ja-Da (Ja Da, Ja Da, Jing, Jing, Jing!)" is a hit song written in 1918 by Bob Carleton. The title is sometimes rendered simply as "Jada." The song has flourished through the decades as a jazz standard.

In his definitive American Popular Songs, Alec Wilder writes about the song's simplicity:

... It fascinates me that such a trifling tune could have settled into the public consciousness as Ja-Da has. Of course it's bone simple, and the lyric says almost nothing, except perhaps the explanation of its success lies in the lyric itself. "That's a funny little bit of melody—it's soothing and appealing to me." It's cute, it's innocent, and it's "soothing." And, wonderfully enough, the only other statement the lyric makes is "Ja-Da, Ja-Da, Ja-Da, Ja-Da, Jing, Jing, Jing."

== Selected renditions ==
- Player piano roll, Vocalstyle Company, #11302. Vodvil Series, as played by Cliff Hess
- 1918 — Original New Orleans Jazz Band
- 1918 — Arthur Fields
- 1938 — Tommy Ladnier and Sidney Bechet
- 1939 — Alice Faye sings it in the musical film Rose of Washington Square (1939)
- 1945 — Bunk Johnson and Don Ewell
- 1947 — Frank Sinatra & Peggy Lee
- 1947 — Muggsy Spanier
- 1954 — Big Chief Jazzband (on the 78 rpm record His Master's Voice A.L. 3401)
- 1955 — Marian McPartland - At the Hickory House
- 1957 — Pee Wee Hunt
- 1958 — Ted Heath Orchestra
- 1961 — Frankie Valli and The Four Seasons
- 1966 — The Fireballs
- 1982, 1986, and 1987 — Musical entertainers Sharon, Lois & Bram & The Mammoth Band, recorded live and in studio
- Al Hirt
- Oscar Peterson
- Erroll Garner
- Louis Armstrong
- Al Jarreau
- Hot Tuna as "Keep On Truckin'" (Note: First released on the 1972 album Burgers. The title, lyrics, and some chord changes in this rendition — and the band name "Hot Tuna" — are related to a song first recorded by Blind Boy Fuller, "Truckin' My Blues Away," the origin for the R. Crumb comic — and the popular phrase — "Keep On Truckin'". This recording reappeared on Flight Log, a 1977 compilation by Jefferson Airplane and related bands, this time with the double title "Ja Da (Keep on Truckin')". The song is credited to Carleton or, on recent releases, as "traditional" (for example, on Live in Japan).)
- Johnny and The Hurricanes
- Bobby Hackett
- God-des and She
- Scott Walker chorus sung in song "Psoriatic" from 2006's The Drift
- Sonny Rollins 're-invented it' using the Ja-Da chords for his composition "Doxy" in 1954.

=== Comedy rendition ===
- In the 1970s, the tune was appropriated by the Canadian comedy duo Maclean and Maclean, who recorded it as their signature piece, with bawdy lyrics added.

== In popular culture ==
In Jack Finney's 1995 novel From Time to Time, the time-traveling protagonist recalls a childhood memory of his aunt dressing up in her old flapper costume and dancing the Charleston to "Ja-Da," singing its playful refrain "Jotta, jotta, jink-jink-jing." [sic] He associates the tune with a stylish young woman he meets in 1912, whom he calls "the Jotta Girl," a character who later becomes central to the novel’s plot. (The reference is anachronistic, as "Ja-Da" was not composed until 1918.)

== See also ==
- List of jazz contrafacts
- List of pre-1920 jazz standards
