= Good Shepherd (song) =

1969 song by Jefferson Airplane

"Good Shepherd" is a traditional song, best known as recorded by Jefferson Airplane on their 1969 album Volunteers. It was arranged and sung by the group's lead guitarist Jorma Kaukonen, who described their interpretation of it as psychedelic folk-rock.

Called by nearly a dozen different names and with varying words, melodies and purpose but common themes, the song's history reflects many of the evolutionary changes and cross-currents of American music. It begins early in the 19th century with a backwoods preacher who wrote hymns, persists through that century, manifests itself in a 1930s gospel blues recording done in a prison by a blind inmate convicted of murder, and sees use in the 1950s as a folk song, before attaining its realization by Jefferson Airplane. Several of these different variants of the song are still performed in the 21st century.

== Hymn ==
"Good Shepherd" originated in a very early 19th century hymn written by the Methodist minister Reverend John Adam Granade (1770–1807), "Let Thy Kingdom, Blessed Savior". Granade was a significant figure of the Great Revival in the American West during the 19th century's first decade, as the most important author of camp meeting hymns during that time. He was referred to by the Nashville Banner as the "wild man of Goose Creek", and was also variously known as "the poet of the backwoods" and "the Wild Man of Holston". Granade worked in part in the world of shape-note singing in the Shenandoah Valley, where a variety of musical sources both sacred and profane were at play.

This new hymn had an immediate effect. A Thomas Griffin recalls hearing it in a Methodist meeting in Oglethorpe, Georgia in 1808. He wrote that the singing of the hymn "made the flesh tremble on me, and caused an awful sense of the hereafter to press on my mind"; he converted to Christianity a few days later. Granade's work can be seen in the 1817 hymnal A Selection of Hymns and Spiritual Songs in Two Parts as "Come good shepherd, feed thy Sheep", while the first line of the hymn also makes an appearance in one Eleazer Sherman's 1832 memoir.

It then appeared in Joshua Leavitt's popular and influential 1833 tunebook The Christian Lyre as "Let thy kingdom", associated to the tune "Good Shepherd" with an 8.7. metrical pattern. It contained lines such as:

Let thy kingdom, blessed Savior,
Come, and bid our jarring cease;
Come, oh come! and reign for ever,
God of love and Prince of peace;
...
Some for Paul, some for Apollos,
Some for Cephas—none agree;
...
Not upheld by force or numbers,
Come, good Shepherd, feed thy sheep.

It appears in this form in several hymnals of the 1830s and 1840s, including one created by the Mormons. The most likely tune for it, however, would have been different from the eventual gospel blues one. Titled "The Good Shepherd" and with only two verses printed instead of the previous six or seven, it appeared again in an 1853 New England Christian Convention hymnal.

The hymn is on occasion still sung today.

== Gospel blues ==
By the 1880s, "Let Thy Kingdom, Blessed Savior" could be found in Marshall W. Taylor's hymnal of African American religious songs, A Collection of Revival Hymns and Plantation Melodies. It subsequently was transformed by the more general forces shaping American musical forms. The influence of Methodist hymns on Negro spirituals is a complex topic that scholars often disagree on, while there was a more definite and direct influence of African-American spirituals upon the blues.

In any case, the aging blind blues player Jimmie Strothers recorded the song, as "The Blood-Strained Banders", sometimes called "Keep Away from the Bloodstained Banders", for Alan Lomax and Harold Spivacke on behalf of the Library of Congress in June 1936. (The name was probably a corruption of "Blood Stained Bandits".) Strothers accompanied himself on four-string banjo, an instrument upon which his skill was well regarded. Coming from the Appalachian part of Virginia, Strothers had lost his sight in a mine explosion and had made a living playing on street corners and in medicine shows. Blind, itinerant street singers like Strothers were part of the tradition that kept African-American religious music alive. The recording was made at the Virginia State Prison Farm near Goochland, Virginia, where Strothers was serving time for having murdered his wife. (Although sometimes described as having murdered his wife with an axe, in letters to Governor of Virginia James H. Price requesting pardon Strothers wrote that he shot his wife with a pistol in self-defense. The pardon was granted in 1939.) Lomax thought prisons were a good place to find old songs, and was also interested in illustrating the interaction of white and black music. This haunting recording was part of what Allmusic describes as a "group of songs that explore the boundaries between the sacred and the profane."

If you want to get to heaven
... Over on, the other shore
Stay out of the way of the blood-stained bandit —
Oh good shepherd,
Feed my sheep.
One for Paul, one for Silas ...
One for to make, my heart rejoice.
Can't you hear, my lambs acallin'?
Oh good shepherd,
Feed my sheep.

"Blood-stained Banders" has been called a "dark homily [that] bubbles up archaic invectives for the devil that huddles behind every stranger's face." Strothers' recording of "Blood-stained Banders" was described in the 1941 book Our Singing Country by Alan Lomax and his father John A. Lomax, with the transcription being done by Ruth Crawford Seeger. The recording was released in 1942 by the Library of Congress as Archive of Folk Song, Recording Laboratory AFS L3 Folk Music of the United States: Afro American Spirituals, Work Songs and Ballads, a collection of field recordings including those by State Penitentiary and State Farm prisoners. It first appeared on 78 rpm records, then was released again on LP album in the mid-1960s. In 1998, it was issued by Rounder Records on Compact Disc as Afro-American Spirituals, Work Songs & Ballads, which is also available from the Library of Congress. It also appears on the CD The Ballad Hunter, Parts VII and VIII from the Library of Congress, originally issued as Archive of Folk Song, Recording Laboratory AFS L52 in 1941.

Transcribed in 2/2 time, the Strothers recording's rhythm and melody are somewhat similar but still measurably different from what would come later. Not a Negro spiritual per se, it was not listed in the top 500 spirituals in a listing of some 6,000 constructed by scholar John Lovell, Jr. in 1972.

== Folk ==
In 1953, Ruth Crawford Seeger collected and transcribed the song as "Don't You Hear The Lambs A-Crying" in her acclaimed volume American Folk Songs for Christmas. Dartmouth College music professor Larry Polansky comments that in doing so, Ruth Crawford Seeger took the hard-edged gospel blues and "revoice[d] it as a beautiful, shape-note influenced hymn."

The "Blood Stained Banders" form was then recorded by The Folksmiths in 1958 on their Folkways Records LP We've Got Some Singing to Do. This was an effort organized by Joe Hickerson, who would become director of the American Folklife Center at the Library of Congress. We've Got Some Singing to Do and its accompanying songbook were distributed to a number of summer camps, and were responsible for the popularization of several freedom-longing African-American songs such as "Kum Ba Yah". The song was circulating in folk circles in other forms as well, and Pete Seeger published a variant with a more explicitly political message, called "If You Want To Go To Freedom", in the mimeographed-but-influential Broadside Magazine in 1963.

Meanwhile, a recording of the Ruth Crawford Seeger "Don't You Hear The Lambs A-Crying" was done for the 1989 album American Folk Songs for Christmas by Peggy Seeger, Mike Seeger, and Penny Seeger. Dartmouth's Polansky then arranged the song under that title for strings in 1999, which was premiered at that year's Spoleto Music Festival.

The original strain of "Blood-Stained Banders" is still played; Bobby Horton recorded it in 2003 with an extended guitar part, as part of the soundtrack for the Ken Burns documentary Horatio's Drive. Hickerson also still performs the tune in the first decade of the 21st century.

== Kaukonen and Jefferson Airplane ==
"Blood-Stained Banders" was thus the proximate source for what was taught to guitarist Jorma Kaukonen by folk singer Roger Perkins and friend Tom Hobson in the early 1960s. Kaukonen had grown up in Washington, D.C. and around the world as the son of a diplomat, then had migrated to the San Francisco Bay Area where he became a lover of various folk revival styles, especially acoustic blues and downhome blues. The song became part of Kaukonen's repertoire as he played around San Francisco clubs, well before he joined Jefferson Airplane. Kaukonen continued to evolve musically; the enticement of exploring the technology around the electric guitar led him to join the Airplane. An evolving rendition of Kaukonen's imagining of the song is captured on a circulating recording of his May 21, 1968, performance at the Carousel Ballroom in San Francisco during a jam session of area musicians led by Jerry Garcia.

Now titled simply "Good Shepherd", a recording of the song became Kaukonen's major showcase number on the Airplane's November 1969 Volunteers album, where it avoided the political topicality of the most visible tracks on the rest of the album. "Good Shepherd" encompassed elements of both gospel and blues in its playing and showed that folk roots were still quite present in the Airplane's mixture of sounds and influences that led to psychedelic rock. Indeed, folk music underlay many aspects of the San Francisco psychedelic sound, with the Airplane as a prime example. The recording of "Good Shepherd", which took place from late March to late June 1969, featured a rare Kaukonen lead vocal backed by mellow harmonies from the group. Its arrangement incorporated Kaukonen's sharp, stinging electric guitar lines set against an acoustic guitar opening, with singer Grace Slick wordlessly doubling Kaukonen's guitar line during the instrumental break. The track was considered a beautiful standout on the album. Kaukonen himself later referred to it as "a great spiritual that I really liked. It's a psychedelic folk-rock song."

The arrangement was copyrighted by Kaukonen under BMI and published by the Airplane's Icebag Corporation. Volunteers soon became a gold record and gave the song its greatest visibility since its early days as a hymn. The Airplane "Good Shepherd" has been described as "an ageless representation of genius". It was included on the band's 1970 greatest hits album The Worst of Jefferson Airplane.

The song's first live performance by Jefferson Airplane was on May 7, 1969, in Golden Gate Park in San Francisco, but with Grace Slick singing lead and Kantner doing the backing vocal. Kaukonen would begin singing the lead two days later in Kansas City, and subsequently kept that role. The 2004 CD reissue of Volunteers included a live rendition of "Good Shepherd" as one of five live bonus tracks recorded November 28 and 29, 1969, at the Fillmore East in New York. This performance arrangement had no acoustic guitar part, but instead featured Kantner on electric guitar setting out a repeating but flexible pattern for the song, which Kaukonen then played against with his fills and solos. The song was last played during the original Airplane era in 1972.

"Good Shepherd" was part of the set list of the Airplane's 1989 reunion tour. It was included on the 1987/1990 Airplane compilation 2400 Fulton Street.

As Kaukonen and Airplane bassist Jack Casady focused on the offshoot group Hot Tuna beginning in the early 1970s, "Good Shepherd" became a regular entry in their performance repertoire. One such performance was included on their 2000 DVD Acoustic Blues Live at Sweetwater. Hot Tuna performances of the song would occasionally draw old Airplane members to join in. By 2004, it was often used as a vehicle for a solo bass excursion by Casady.

Besides Hot Tuna's, renditions of "Good Shepherd" also appeared on Kaukonen's 1985 live album Magic (and the 1995 expanded release Magic Two), which contained selections from his solo acoustic performances; as one of Kaukonen's efforts on the 1999 Phil Lesh and Friends live album Love Will See You Through; and on the 2001 Jorma Kaukonen Trio Live album.

In the 21st century, the song continued to draw commentary from listeners. By now Kaukonen was offering the view that the "blood-stained banders" of the lyric was an allusion to the Ku Klux Klan. He continued to find meaning in performing "Good Shepherd" and other songs like it that celebrated religion in one context or another without preaching, saying such material gave him a doorway into scripture: "I guess you could say I loved the Bible without even knowing it. The spiritual message is always uplifting – it's a good thing."
