= Blue Country Heart =

Studio album by Jorma Kaukonen
- Released: June 11, 2002
- Label: Columbia
- Producer: Roger Moutenot; Yves Beauvis

Jorma Kaukonen chronology
Jorma Kaukonen Trio Live (2001)	Blue Country Heart (2002)	Stars in My Crown (2007)

Professional ratings
Review scores
Source	Rating
Allmusic	3/5 stars

Blue Country Heart is a Jorma Kaukonen studio album released in June, 2002. It was his first album on a major label since 1980's Barbeque King. Kaukonen did not write any new compositions for the album, and instead played mostly country-blues cover songs. The album features performances by Sam Bush, Jerry Douglas, Byron House and Bela Fleck, and was nominated for a Grammy Award in 2003 for "Best Traditional Folk Album."

== Track listing ==
1. "Blue Railroad Train" (Lionel Alton Delmore, Rabon Delmore) – 3:44
2. "Just Because" (Joe Shelton, Sydney Robin, Bob Shelton) – 4:16
3. "Blues Stay Away from Me" (Lionel Alton Delmore, Rabon Delmore, Henry Glover, Wayne Raney) – 3:28
4. "Red River Blues" (Jimmie Davis) – 3:25
5. "Bread Line Blues" (Bernard Slim Smith) – 4:38
6. "Waiting for a Train" (Jimmie Rodgers) – 3:26
7. "Those Gambler's Blues" (Jimmie Rodgers) – 3:07
8. "Tom Cat Blues" (Jelly Roll Morton) – 3:05
9. "Big River Blues" (Lionel Alton Delmore) – 3:01
10. "Prohibition Blues" (Clayton McMichen) – 4:13
11. "I'm Free from the Chain Gang Now" (Lou Herscher, Saul Klein) – 3:28
12. "You and My Old Guitar" (Jimmie Rodgers, Elsie McWilliams) – 2:45
13. "What are They Doing in Heaven Today?" (Traditional) – 3:20

== Personnel ==
- Jorma Kaukonen – guitar, vocals
- Sam Bush – mandolin, fiddle, background vocals
- Jerry Douglas – dobro, weissenborn
- Byron House – bass, background vocals
- Béla Fleck – banjo on "Just Because" and "Bread Line Blues"

=== Production ===
- Roger Moutenot – producer, engineer, mixing
- Yves Beauvis – producer, A&R
- Tracy Martinson – engineer, digital recording
- John Hurlbut, K. C. Groves, Rob Clark – assistant engineers
- Ted Jensen – mastering
- Jorma Kaukonen – liner notes
- David Bett – art direction
- Danny Clinch, Glen Rose, Gil Gilbert – photography

== Charts ==
Chart (2002)	Peak position
Billboard Top Internet Albums	9
Billboard Heatseekers	45
