= Live at Sweetwater =

Live album by Hot Tuna
- Released: 1992 (original); 2004 (re-release)
- Recorded: January 27–28, 1992
- Venue: Sweetwater, Mill Valley, CA
- Genre: Blues rock
- Length: 61:47; 73:19 (re-release)
- Label: Relix Records (original); Eagle Records (re-elease)

Hot Tuna chronology
Pair a Dice Found (1990)	Live at Sweetwater (1992)	Live at Sweetwater Two (1993)

Alternative cover
- Cover art of 2004 remastered release

Professional ratings
Review scores
Source	Rating
AllMusic	2/5 stars

Live at Sweetwater is a live Hot Tuna album recorded in 1992 at Mill Valley, CA. It was their first new recording made for Relix Records, although they had previously released older performances with Relix (Splashdown, Historic Hot Tuna). Appearing on the album with Hot Tuna was Bob Weir of the Grateful Dead, blues-singer Maria Muldaur, and keyboardist Pete Sears who ended up staying with the band until 2000. In 2004 Eagle Records re-mastered and re-released the album with several added tracks, and some previous tracks shortened in length.

== 1992 Relix Records track listing ==
1. "Winin' Boy Blues" (Jelly Roll Morton) – 5:07
2. "Great Change" (Rev. Gary Davis) – 3:15
3. "Down and Out" (Cox) – 3:17
4. "Embryonic Journey" (Jorma Kaukonen) – 2:16
5. "Trouble in Mind" (Traditional) – 3:20
6. "Bank Robber" (Joe Strummer, Mick Jones, Michael Campbell) – 4:30
7. "I See the Light" (Kaukonen) – 6:38
8. "I'll Be There for You" (Michael Falzarano, Kaukonen) – 3:38
9. "I Belong to the Band" (Davis) – 3:42
10. "Maggie's Farm" (Bob Dylan) – 6:10
11. "Genesis" (Kaukonen) – 5:20
12. "Ice Age" (Kaukonen) – 6:18
13. "Pass the Snakes" (Kaukonen, Falzarano) – 7:56

== 2004 Eagle Records track listing ==
1. "Winin' Boy Blues" (Jelly Roll Morton) – 5:06
2. "Great Change" (Rev. Gary Davis) – 3:06
3. "Down and Out" (Cox) – 3:16
4. "I Know You Rider" (Traditional) – 4:41
5. "Embryonic Journey" (Jorma Kaukonen) – 2:18
6. "Trouble in Mind" (Traditional) – 3:15
7. "Bank Robber" (Strummer, Jones, Campbell) – 4:30
8. "I See the Light" (Kaukonen) – 6:37
9. "I'll Be There for You" (Michael Falzarano, Kaukonen) – 3:13
10. "True Religion" (Kaukonen) – 4:37
11. "I Belong to the Band" (Davis) – 3:38
12. "Maggie's Farm" (Bob Dylan) – 5:59
13. "That's Alright Mama" (Arthur Crudup) – 2:26
14. "Been So Long" (Kaukonen) – 3:46
15. "Genesis" (Kaukonen) – 4:41
16. "Ice Age" (Kaukonen) – 6:18
17. "Pass the Snakes" (Kaukonen, Falzarano) – 5:52

== Personnel ==
- Jorma Kaukonen – lead guitar, vocals, Dobro, table steel guitar
- Jack Casady – bass
- Michael Falzarano – rhythm guitar, vocals, mandolin, harmonica

=== Additional personnel ===
- Maria Muldaur – vocals, tambourine
- Pete Sears – piano, accordion
- Bob Weir – guitar, vocals

=== Production ===
- Production team from Jorma's Hillside Farm Productions
- Rick Sanchez – engineer
- Ira Wilkes – king roadie and production coordination
- Remote truck at Sweetwater from The Plant Recording Studios
- Gabra Management – management
- Steve Martin (William Morris Agency) – booking agent
- Vanessa Lillian, Gabra Specialities – design layout
- Jorma Kaukonen – liner notes
- Carl Studna – cover photography
- Barry Berenson – photography
- Recorded live at Sweetwater, Mill Valley, CA on January 27 and 28, 1992
