= Classic Hot Tuna Electric =

Live album by Hot Tuna
- Released: 1996
- Recorded: July 3, 1971
- Venue: Fillmore West (San Francisco)
- Genre: Blues rock
- Label: Relix
- Producer: Michael Falzarano; Leslie D. Kippel (executive)

Hot Tuna chronology
Classic Hot Tuna Acoustic (1996)	Classic Hot Tuna Electric (1996)	Splashdown Two (1997)

Classic Hot Tuna Electric is a Hot Tuna album released in 1996 and is an expansion of the B-side of the 1985 vinyl release Historic Live Tuna. The tracks were recorded at a live electric performance on July 3, 1971, at the Fillmore West auditorium in San Francisco.

The A-side of Historic Live Tuna was expanded as Classic Hot Tuna Acoustic and released at the same time as this album.

Another song from the Fillmore West concert, "Keep Your Lamps Trimmed and Burning", was included in the album Fillmore: The Last Days.

== Track listing ==
1. "Intro by Bill Graham" / "Never Happen No More" (Blind Blake) – 6:24
2. "Candy Man" (Rev. Gary Davis) – 5:56
3. "Keep Your Lamps Trimmed & Burning" (Davis) – 7:39
4. "Uncle Sam Blues" (Traditional) – 5:40
5. "John's Other" (Papa John Creach) – 6:00
6. "Rock Me Baby" (Traditional) – 8:30
7. "I Know You Rider" (Traditional) – 7:28
8. "Come Back Baby" (Lightning Hopkins) – 9:14

== Personnel ==
- Jorma Kaukonen – guitars, vocals
- Jack Casady – bass
- Papa John Creach – violin
- Sammy Piazza – drums

=== Production ===
- Michael Falzarano – producer
- Leslie D. Kippel – executive producer
