= Classic Hot Tuna Acoustic =

Live album by Hot Tuna
- Released: 1996
- Recorded: April 30, 1971
- Venue: KSAN (San Mateo, California)
- Genre: Blues rock
- Label: Relix
- Producer: Michael Falzarano; Leslie D. Kippel (executive)

Hot Tuna chronology
Live at Sweetwater Two (1993)	Classic Hot Tuna Acoustic (1996)	Classic Hot Tuna Electric (1996)

Classic Hot Tuna Acoustic is a Hot Tuna album released in 1996 and is an expansion of the A-side of the previous vinyl release Historic Live Tuna. The B-side of the previous release was expanded as Classic Hot Tuna Electric and released at the same time as this album. The tracks are taken from a live acoustic performance played on KSAN radio in 1971.

== Track listing ==
1. "Never Happen No More" (Blind Blake) – 6:08
2. "Candy Man" (Rev. Gary Davis) – 4:35
3. "New Song (for the Morning)" (Jorma Kaukonen) – 5:08
4. "Hesitation Blues" (Traditional) – 5:17
5. "Been So Long" (Kaukonen) – 4:22
6. "Oh Lord, Search My Heart" (Rev. Gary Davis) – 4:45
7. "Uncle Sam Blues" (Traditional) – 5:24
8. "Space Jam" (Jack Casady, Kaukonen) – 0:26
9. "True Religion" (Traditional) – 7:09
10. "Death Don't Have No Mercy" (Davis) – 9:58

== Personnel ==
- Jorma Kaukonen – acoustic guitar, vocals
- Jack Casady – bass
- Papa John Creach – violin
- Sammy Piazza – drums

=== Production ===
- Michael Falzarano – producer
- Leslie D. Kippel – executive producer
- Jorma Kaukonen archives – photography
- Relix archives – photography
