= Live at New Orleans House: Berkeley, CA 09/69 =

Live album by Hot Tuna
- Released: April 20, 2010
- Recorded: September 16–24, 1969
- Venue: New Orleans House; Berkeley, California
- Genre: Americana, blues
- Length: 68:16
- Label: Collector's Choice
- Producer: Hot Tuna

Hot Tuna chronology
And Furthurmore... (1999)	Live at New Orleans House: Berkeley, CA 09/69 (2010)	Steady as She Goes (2011)

Live at New Orleans House: Berkeley, CA 09/69 is an album by the American rock band Hot Tuna. As the name suggests, it was recorded live at the New Orleans House music venue in Berkeley, California in September 1969. It was released in April 2010.

On Live at New Orleans House, Jorma Kaukonen sings and plays acoustic guitar, and Jack Casady plays bass guitar. They are accompanied by Will Scarlett on harmonica. The album was recorded at the same set of shows as their eponymous debut album, but includes all different performances.

== Critical reception ==
Professional ratings
Review scores
Source	Rating
AllMusic	4/5 stars
Rolling Stone	3.5/5 stars

On AllMusic, Thom Jurek said, "Along with harmonica player Will Scarlett, the duo took Kaukonen's truly amazing technical facility on the acoustic guitar... and married it to Casady's funky electric basslines, coming up with a reverent though utterly contemporary interpretation of blues, rags, and folk songs.... The performance flows spontaneously and organically from start to finish, clocking in at a full 68 minutes without a weak moment."

In Rolling Stone, David Fricke wrote, "This CD of earthy, gently swinging outtakes has acoustic spins on later electric-Tuna covers ("Candy Man", "Keep On Truckin' ") and a long spell of intricate fingerpicking and dancing electric bass in Kaukonen's "Sea Child"."

On Musicoscribe, Bill Kopp said, "... here Hot Tuna really does tear it up. Casady’s suitably busy bass lines don't intrude on the songs; they propel them forward. The fretboard interplay between ace guitarist Kaukonen and bassist Casady is fiery... Fans of the acoustic blues variants of rock (think of Workingman's Dead and American Beauty era Grateful Dead) will find much to enjoy in this hour-plus set."

Audiophile News & Music Review wrote, "Consisting of superior outtakes and previously unreleased gems during the recording of the first Hot Tuna album, this newly remastered disc is a definitive treasure trove for the fans."

== Track listing ==
1. "Come Back Baby" (Lightnin' Hopkins) – 6:48
2. "Keep On Truckin'" (Bob Carleton) – 4:27
3. "Death Don't Have No Mercy" (Reverend Gary Davis) – 6:38
4. "Winin' Boy Blues" (Jelly Roll Morton) – 5:10
5. "Uncle Sam Blues" (traditional, arranged by Jack Casady and Jorma Kaukonen) – 4:39
6. "Know You Rider" (traditional, arranged by Casady and Kaukonen) – 3:42
7. "Don't You Leave Me Here" (Morton) – 3:22
8. "Never Happen No More" (Blind Blake) – 3:42
9. "How Long Blues" (Leroy Carr) – 4:56
10. "True Religion" (Kaukonen) – 4:55
11. "Sea Child" (Kaukonen) – 10:27
12. "Candy Man" (Davis) – 4:48
13. "Keep Your Lamps Trimmed and Burning" (Davis) – 4:42

== Personnel ==
Hot Tuna

- Jorma Kaukonen – acoustic guitar, vocals
- Jack Casady – bass
- Will Scarlett – harmonica

Production

- Produced by Hot Tuna
- Mastering, liner notes: Joe Reagoso
- Photographs: Mike Frankel
