= Stars in My Crown (album) =

Studio album by Jorma Kaukonen
- Released: March 2007
- Recorded: 2007
- Studio: 17 Grand, Sound Emporium, and Minutia, Nashville, Tennessee
- Label: Red House
- Producer: Byron House

Jorma Kaukonen chronology
Blue Country Heart (2002)	Stars in My Crown (2007)	River of Time (2009)

Professional ratings
Review scores
Source	Rating
AllMusic	4/5 stars

Stars in My Crown is a Jorma Kaukonen studio album released in 2007 on Red House Records. Kaukonen returned to songwriting with this album, and again incorporated the work of several contributing musicians including Barry Mitterhoff, who had been playing mandolin with Hot Tuna since 2002. The album made it to the Billboard chart for "Top Heatseekers" peaking at No. 37.

== Track listing ==
1. "Overture: Heart Temporary" (Jorma Kaukonen) – 5:12
2. "Fur Peace Rag" (Kaukonen) – 3:00
3. "By the Rivers of Babylon" (Brent Dowe, Trevor McNaughton) – 4:54
4. "Living in the Moment" (Kaukonen) – 3:56
5. "Late Breaking News" (Kaukonen) – 3:03
6. "Come Back Baby" (Walter Davis) – 5:47
7. "Mighty Hard Pleasure" (Joe Croker) – 3:31
8. "No Demon" (Byron House) – 3:06
9. "There's a Table Sitting in Heaven" (Rev. Gary Davis) – 3:54
10. "The Man Comes Around" (Johnny Cash) – 4:03
11. "A Life Well Lived" (Kaukonen) – 4:00
12. "Will There Be Any Stars in My Crown?" (John R. Sweney, Eliza E. Hewitt) – 3:55
13. "Preacher Picked the Guitar" (Roy Book Binder) – 3:08
14. "Instrumental Reprise: Will There Be Any Stars in My Crown?" (Sweney, Hewitt, arranged by Davis, Ernie Hawkins) – 1:03

== Personnel ==
Heart Temporary

- Jorma Kaukonen – vocals, acoustic guitar
- Barry Mitterhoff – bouzouki
- Byron House – upright bass
- Andrea Zonn, Conni Ellisor, David Angell, Mary Kathryn VanOsdale, Pamela Sixfin – violins
- Chris Farrell, James Grosjean, Kristin Wilkinson, Monisa Angell – violas
- John Catchings, Kirsten Cassel – cellos

Fur Peace Rag

- Jorma Kaukonen – acoustic guitar
- Barry Mitterhoff – mandolin
- Byron House – upright bass
- Jim Hoke – clarinet

By the Rivers of Babylon

- Jorma Kaukonen – lead vocals, acoustic guitar
- Barry Mitterhoff – mandolin
- Byron House – upright bass
- Chris Brown – drums, percussion
- Ed Gerhard – weissenborn
- Fred Eltringham – cowbell, guiro, shaker
- Phil Madeira – organ
- Ann McCray, Gale West – support vocals
- Henry House, Lily Mitterhoff, Maya Mitterhoff, Tessa Mitterhoff, Truman House – children's support vocals

Living in the Moment

- Jorma Kaukonen – acoustic guitar
- Barry Mitterhoff – mandolin
- Byron House – upright bass
- Chris Brown – drums, percussion
- Ed Gerhard – acoustic guitar
- Sally Van Meter – resonator guitar

Late Breaking News

- Jorma Kaukonen – vocals, acoustic guitar
- Barry Mitterhoff – mandolin
- Byron House – upright bass
- Chris Brown – drums, percussion
- Ed Gerhard – weissenborn
- Jim Hoke – soprano saxophone
- Sally Van Meter – resonator guitar

Come Back Baby

- Jorma Kaukonen – vocals, acoustic guitar
- Barry Mitterhoff – mandolin
- Byron House – upright bass
- Jelly Roll Johnson – harmonica

Mighty Hard Pleasure

- Jorma Kaukonen – vocals
- Ed Gerhard – acoustic guitar
- Greg Leisz – pedal steel guitar
- Phil Madeira – organ

No Demon

- Jorma Kaukonen – vocals
- Barry Mitterhoff – mandolin
- Byron House – upright bass
- Reese Wynans – upright piano
- Sally Van Meter – resonator guitar
- Tim Stafford – acoustic guitar

There's a Table Sitting in Heaven

- Jorma Kaukonen – lead vocals, acoustic guitar
- Barry Mitterhoff – tenor banjo
- Byron House – upright bass, bass support vocal
- Jelly Roll Johnson – harmonica
- Sally Van Meter – resonator guitar, high tenor support vocal
- Tim Stafford – acoustic guitar, high baritone support vocal

The Man Comes Around

- Jorma Kaukonen – vocals, acoustic guitar
- Byron House – upright bass
- Greg Leisz – electric guitar
- Jason Burleson – 5-string banjo
- Rob Ickes – resonator guitar
- Shawn Lane – mandolin
- Tim Stafford – acoustic guitar

A Life Well Lived

- Jorma Kaukonen – acoustic guitar
- Barry Mitterhoff – mandolin, tenor banjo
- Byron House – upright bass
- Chris Brown – drums, percussion
- Fats Kaplin – pedal steel guitar
- Jelly Roll Johnson – harmonica
- Reese Wynans – upright piano

Will There Be Any Stars in My Crown?

- Jorma Kaukonen – lead vocals, acoustic guitar
- Barry Mitterhoff – mandolin
- Byron House – upright bass
- Chris Brown – drums, percussion
- Fred Eltringham – tambourine
- Reese Wynans – upright piano
- Sally Van Meter – resonator guitar
- Ann McCrary, Gale West – support vocals
- Calvin Settles – tenor support vocal
- Odessa Settles – alto support vocal
- Shirley Settles – soprano support vocal
- Ted Settles – bass support vocal

Preacher Picked the Guitar

- Jorma Kaukonen – vocals, acoustic guitar

Will There Be Any Stars in My Crown? (instrumental)

- Jorma Kaukonen – acoustic guitar

=== Production ===
- Byron House – producer
- Gary Paczosa – recordist, engineer
- Recorded in Nashville at 17 Grand, Sound Emporium and Minutia
- Mixed in Nashville at Minutia
- Additional recording by Ed Cash at Ed's in Franklin, TN; Phil Madeira at Planet of the Tapes in Brentwood, TN; Kyle Ford at Sound Emporium in Nashville; Byron House at Embassy Suits Room 708 in Austin; Brandon Bell at Minutia in Nashville; Sheriff Bob at Sheriff Studios in New York City
- Brandon Bell, Joey Crawford, Kyle Ford, Stephen Sharp – assistant engineers
- Danny Weiss, Mary Olive Smith, Stephanie Mitterhoff – NYC special assistants
- Mastered by Jim DeMain at Yes Master in Nashville
- Kristin Wilkinson – string arrangement and contractor for "Heart Temporary"
- Stephen Lamb – music preparation for "Heart Temporary"
- Photography – Christopher M. Kehoe

== Charts ==
Year	Chart	Position
2007	Billboard Top Heatseekers	37
