= Too Hot to Handle (Jorma Kaukonen album) =

Studio album by Jorma Kaukonen
- Released: March 1, 1985
- Recorded: Arch Studios, Berkeley, California; Symphony Hall, New Haven, Connecticut
- Label: Relix Records

Jorma Kaukonen chronology
Barbeque King (1981)	Too Hot to Handle (1985)	Magic (1985)

Too Hot to Handle is a Jorma Kaukonen acoustic solo album recorded live at the New Haven Symphony Hall on July 20, 1984, and at an unknown location on November 18, 1984. It was released on Relix Records. Kaukonen's wife at the time, Margareta Kaukonen, composed some of the tracks with him and is credited as "Malles Meje."

"Too Many Years" and "Ice Age" were later re-recorded with Jefferson Airplane for their eponymous reunion album. The former was again re-recorded for Kaukonen's 1998 album Too Many Years.

== Track listing ==
=== Side A ===
1. "Broken Highway" (Malles Meje, Jorma Kaukonen) – 5:16
2. "Too Many Years" (Kaukonen) – 4:43
3. "Radical Sleep" (Meje, Kaukonen) – 4:13
4. "Killing Time in the Crystal City" (Kaukonen) – 6:44

=== Side B ===
1. "Ice Age" (Kaukonen) – 5:54
2. "Walkin' Blues" (Robert Johnson) – 3:37
3. "Death Don't Have No Mercy" (Rev. Gary Davis) – 6:22
4. "Too Hot to Handle" (Meje, Kaukonen) – 5:01

== Personnel ==
- Jorma Kaukonen – acoustic guitar, vocals
