= I Got Blues for Ya =

Studio album by Michael Falzarano
- Released: July 22, 2014
- Genre: Blues rock
- Length: 62:01
- Label: Hypnotation / Woodstock
- Producer: Michael Falzarano

Michael Falzarano chronology
We Are All One (2008)	I Got Blues for Ya (2014)	A Kaleidoscope Christmas (2020)

I Got Blues for Ya is an album by guitarist and singer Michael Falzarano, who is best known as a member of the New Riders of the Purple Sage and, before that, Hot Tuna. His first album in six years, it features Falzarano and his "extended family" of fellow musicians playing ten original blues rock songs and two covers. It was released on the Hypnotation Records label, distributed by Woodstock Records, on July 22, 2014.

== Recording ==
On his website, Michael Falzarano wrote that he wanted to get back to his blues roots and make an album that sounded like a late '60s / early '70s blues rock record. Most of the tracks were recorded without overdubs, and some of them were recorded in one take, "to catch the true energy and spirit of a song."

== Critical reception ==
In Relix, Brian Robbins wrote, "Guitarist/vocalist Michael Falzarano has always brought out the best in the players around him, including stints as Jorma Kaukonen’s wingman in Hot Tuna and his present-day role as psychedelicized rhythm cop in the New Riders. When Falzarano’s name is on the label—as it is for his new solo album I Got Blues for Ya—things aren’t any different. A revolving cast of talent (including Crowmatix’ Professor Louie, Kane Daily and Kerry Kearney) assist Falzarano in bluesy greasiness."

On Fab Radio, Fabrizio Poggi said, "A fantastic album by Michael Falzarano, famous for his work with Hot Tuna and the New Riders of the Purple Sage. Recorded with different combinations of musicians, all excellent, the CD features twelve tracks of electric blues, with nuances of Southern blues, electro-acoustic folk blues, rock 'n' roll, and much more."

== Track listing ==
All songs written by Michael Falzarano, except "Death Don't Have No Mercy" by Reverend Gary Davis and "Let's Work Together" by Wilbert Harrison.

1. "The Night King Curtis Died" – 4:12
2. "I Got Blues for Ya" – 5:14
3. "I Never Think About You" – 5:29
4. "Snake Box Boogie" – 7:45
5. "Big Fish" – 3:59
6. "We Got a Party Going On" – 4:43
7. "Good Good Lovin'" – 4:06
8. "Crossroads Avenue" – 6:53
9. "The Devil's Gone Fishin'" – 4:54
10. "Death Don't Have No Mercy" – 7:57 – recorded live at Brooklyn Bowl
11. "Trouble" – 3:34
12. "Let's Work Together" – 3:25

== Personnel ==
Musicians

- Michael Falzarano – guitar, acoustic guitar, vocals
- Peter Bennett – bass
- Klyph Black – bass
- Lisa Bouchelle – backup vocals
- Gary Burke – drums
- Frank Campbell – bass
- Christian Cassan – drums
- Frank Celenza – bass
- Tom Circosta – acoustic guitar
- Vassar Clements – fiddle
- Josh Colow – lead guitar
- Jason Crosby – fiddle
- Kane Daily – lead guitar, slide guitar
- Dave Diamond – drums
- Harley Fine – Farfisa organ
- Jimmy Fleming – mandolin
- Ray Grappone – drums
- Kerry Kearney – lead guitar, slide guitar
- Johnny Markowski – drums
- Chris Matheos – bass
- Miss Marie – backup vocals, percussion
- Barry Mitterhoff – mandolin
- Mike Miz – acoustic guitar
- Eileen Murphy – drums
- Professor Louie – piano, Hammond organ, backup vocals
- Pete Sears – piano
- John Marshall Smith – organ
- Alex P. Suter – backup vocals
- Freeman White – keyboards
- Charlie Wolfe – harmonica

Production

- Produced by Michael Falzarano
- Recording: Vicki Bell, Professor Louie, Danny Sheehan, Scarekrow
- Mixing: Michael Falzarano, Dan Skye
- Mastering: Jon Marshall Smith
- Photography: Gina Guarnieri
- Design: Kevin Morgan
