= Marian McPartland at the Hickory House =

Studio album by Marian McPartland
- Released: April 20, 1955
- Recorded: September – December 1954
- Genre: Jazz
- Label: Capitol; T574

Professional ratings
Review scores
Source	Rating
AllMusic	4/5 stars

Marian McPartland at the Hickory House is an album released by Marian McPartland in 1955.

== Background ==
The album was supposedly a "live" set, but is actually a studio recording. The album was re-issued on CD by Jasmine records in 1996.

== Track listing ==
1. "I Hear Music" (Burton Lane, Frank Loesser)
2. "Tickle Toe" (Lester Young)
3. "Street of Dreams" (Victor Young, Sam M. Lewis)
4. "How Long Has This Been Going On?" (George Gershwin, Ira Gershwin)
5. "Let's Call the Whole Thing Off" (George Gershwin, Ira Gershwin)
6. "Lush Life" (Billy Strayhorn)
7. "Mad About the Boy" (Noël Coward)
8. "Love You Madly" (Duke Ellington)
9. "Skylark" (Hoagy Carmichael, Johnny Mercer)
10. "Ja-Da" (Bob Carleton)
11. "I've Told Ev'ry Little Star" (Jerome Kern, Oscar Hammerstein II)
12. "Moon Song" (Sam Coslow, Arthur Johnston)

== Personnel ==
- Marian McPartland - piano
- Bill Crow - bass
- Joe Morello - drums
- Ruth Negri - harp (4 tracks)
- George Koutzen - cello (4 tracks)
