= Voluntary Target =

Compilation album by Leo Kottke
- Released: 1984
- Label: Pair

Leo Kottke chronology
Time Step (1983)	Voluntary Target (1984)	A Shout Toward Noon (1986)

Voluntary Target is a 1984 compilation LP album by guitarist Leo Kottke. It includes all of Balance and Burnt Lips.

== Track list ==
Record 1 Balance
Side A:

1. "Tell Mary" - 3:04
2. "I Don't Know Why" - 2:07
3. "Embryonic Journey" (Jorma Kaukonen) - 3:17
4. "Disguise" - 2:45
5. "Whine" - 3:10

Side B:

1. "Losing Everything" - 2:58
2. "Drowning" - 2:12
3. "Dolores" - 3:09
4. "1/2 Acre of Garlic" - 2:33
5. "Learning the Game" (Buddy Holly) - 3:16

Record 2 Burnt Lips
Side A:

1. "Endless Sleep" (Nick Lowe) - 3:37
2. "Cool Water" (Bob Nolan) - 2:25
3. "Frank Forgets" - 2:09
4. "Sonora's Death Row" (Kevin Blackie Farrell) - 4:30
5. "The Quiet Man" - 2:05
6. "Everybody Lies" - 2:19
7. "I Called Back" - 2:38

Side B:

1. "A Low Thud" - 3:07
2. "Orange Room" - 3:33
3. "The Credits: Out-takes from Terry's Movie" - 3:46
4. "Voluntary Target" - 2:58
5. "Burnt Lips" - 2:07
6. "Sand Street" - 1:46
7. "The Train and the Gate: From Terry's Movie" - 3:18

All songs by Leo Kottke except as noted

== Personnel ==
- Leo Kottke - 6- & 12-string guitars, electric guitar, vocals
- Kenneth Buttrey - drums, clavinet
- Mike Leech - bass
- Bobby Ogdin & John Harris - piano
