= Skyline (band) =

American newgrass group

- Origin: United States
- Genres: Newgrass
- Years active: 1977–1989
- Past members: Tony Trischka; Danny Weiss; Dede Wyland; Larry Cohen; Barry Mitterhoff; Rachel Kalem

Skyline was a newgrass group active in the 1970s and 1980s headed by Tony Trischka. The band consisted of Trischka on banjo, Danny Weiss on guitar and vocals, Dede Wyland on guitar and vocals, Larry Cohen on bass, and Barry Mitterhoff on mandolin. In the last year of their career Dede Wyland left the band and was replaced by Rachel Kalem. They were a major proponent of the "newgrass" sound, known for jazz-infused riffs and extensive use of harmony in their singing. The band released several albums during the '80s, culminating with their final release, Fire of Grace, in 1989. In 1999, they released a retrospective album called Ticket Back.

Some members of the band still play together at times. Weiss, Cohen, and Mitterhoff performed as Silk City, a band named after an old nickname for Paterson, New Jersey. The band was active around 2000–2004, before Mitterhoff left to join Hot Tuna.

== Discography ==
- Late to Work (Flying Fish, 1981)
- Stranded in the Moonlight (Flying Fish, 1984)
- Skyline Drive (Flying Fish, 1986)
- Fire of Grace (Flying Fish, 1989)
