= And Furthurmore... =

Live album by Hot Tuna
- Released: October 12, 1999
- Recorded: June – July 1998
- Genre: Rock
- Length: 77:05
- Label: Grateful Dead
- Producer: Michael Falzarano

Hot Tuna chronology
The Best of Hot Tuna (1998)	And Furthurmore... (1999)	Live at New Orleans House: Berkeley, CA 09/69 (2010)

Professional ratings
Review scores
Source	Rating
AllMusic	3/5 stars
The Music Box	3.5/5 stars

And Furthurmore... is a live album by the American rock band Hot Tuna. It was recorded on the 1998 Furthur Festival tour. It was released on October 12, 1999.

And Furthurmore... was released in HDCD format. This provides enhanced sound quality when played on CD players with HDCD capability, and is fully compatible with regular CD players.

== Track listing ==
1. "I See the Light" (Jorma Kaukonen) / "Sunny Day Strut" (Kaukonen) – 6:50
2. "Been So Long" (Kaukonen) – 3:52
3. "True Religion" (Kaukonen) – 5:00
4. "Third Week in Chelsea" (Kaukonen) – 4:47
5. "Embryonic Journey" (Kaukonen) – 2:20
6. "I Am the Light of This World" (Gary Davis) – 3:48
7. "Watch the North Wind Rise" (Kaukonen) – 5:12
8. "Water Song" (Kaukonen) – 6:02
9. "Gypsy Fire" (Michael Falzarano) – 7:51
10. "Just My Way" (Falzarano) – 7:07
11. "Hypnotation Blues" (Kaukonen, Falzarano) – 8:33
12. "Big Railroad Blues" (traditional) – 4:04
13. "Funky #7" (Kaukonen, Jack Casady) – 11:37

== Personnel ==
=== Hot Tuna ===
- Jorma Kaukonen – guitar, vocals
- Jack Casady – bass
- Pete Sears – keyboards
- Michael Falzarano – guitar; vocals on "Gypsy Fire", "Just My Way", "Big Railroad Blues"
- Harvey Sorgen – drums

=== Production ===
- Michael Falzarano – producer
- Tom Flye – engineer, mixing engineer
- Jeffrey Norman – mastering engineer
- Richard Leeds – design
- Timothy Truman – cover illustration
- Rob Cohn – photographs
- Jeff Tamarkin – liner notes
