= Christmas (Jorma Kaukonen album) =

Studio album by Jorma Kaukonen
- Released: July 1996
- Label: Relix Records
- Producer: Jorma Kaukonen; Michael Falzarano

Jorma Kaukonen chronology
The Land of Heroes (1995)	Christmas (1996)	Too Many Years (1998)

Professional ratings
Review scores
Source	Rating
Allmusic	2.5/5 stars

Christmas is a Jorma Kaukonen studio album released in July 1996. It was the only themed album Kaukonen recorded and was a departure from the usual Rev. Gary Davis influenced tunes. It included new Christmas-themed compositions as well old hymns such as "Silent Night." Like the previous album, The Land of Heroes, Christmas incorporated the work of Michael Falzarano and Fred Bogert. Kaukonen's wife Vanessa also performed vocals and co-wrote one song. It was also the only time Kaukonen performed keyboards on an album.

== Track listing ==
1. "Downhill Sleigh Ride" (Jorma Kaukonen, Michael Falzarano) – 3:33
2. "Christmas Rule" (Kaukonen, Falzarano, Vanessa Lillian) – 4:00
3. "What Child Is This?" (Traditional) – 2:57
4. "Christmas Blues" (Falzarano) – 4:35
5. "Journey of the Three Wise Men" (Kaukonen, Falzarano) – 4:36
6. "Baby Boy" (Traditional) – 3:45
7. "You're Still Standing" (Falzarano) – 3:26
8. "Silent Night" (Traditional) – 4:52
9. "Holiday Marmalade" (Kaukonen, Falzarano) – 11:39
10. "Holiday Segue" – 0:20

== Personnel ==
- Jorma Kaukonen – guitars, keyboards, vocals
- Michael Falzarano – rhythm guitar, sleigh bells, vocals
- Fred Bogert – bass, keyboards, vocals
- Vanessa Lillian – vocals
- Chris Munson – drums
- Wayne Killius – drums

=== Production ===
- Jorma Kaukonen – producer
- Michael Falzarano – producer
- Fred Bogert – engineer
- Chris Munson – engineer
- Todd Whited – engineer
- John Sullivan – photography
- Kevin Morgan Studio – design, cover art
- Vanessa Lillian Kaukonen – photography
