= We Are All One =

Studio album by Michael Falzarano
- Released: October 28, 2008
- Recorded: 2004 – 2007
- Genre: Rock
- Length: 57:29
- Label: Woodstock
- Producer: Michael Falzarano

Michael Falzarano chronology
The King James Sessions (2006)	We Are All One (2008)	I Got Blues for Ya (2014)

We Are All One is an album by Michael Falzarano. It was released by Woodstock Records on October 28, 2008.

Michael Falzarano is a rock guitarist, singer, and songwriter. He is best known as a member of the New Riders of the Purple Sage and, before that, Hot Tuna. He has also played with other bands and recording artists, both live and in the studio. We Are All One is his third album as a band leader, after Mecca (1996) and The King James Sessions (2006).

== Recording ==
The songs on We Are All One were recorded over a period of several years, with different combinations of musicians. Most of the material was recorded in 2004 and 2005, before Michael Falzarano joined the New Riders.

In a 2009 interview, Falzarano said, "I didn’t start out thinking that I was going to do a 'special guest' album or an 'and friends' album. Whenever friends of mine or people I knew were coming to town, I'd say, 'Hey, I'm in the middle of working on an album. Are you interested in doing a session?' The reason it sounds [so cohesive] — even though it took so long to come together — is because when I do my stuff or I do my thing, it's me. It's what I sound like. Regardless of whether it takes me ten years or two weeks, it usually winds up sounding pretty much the same. For the most part, I play traditional-sounding roots music, Americana kind of stuff. So, it's not fashionable in the sense that if I don't get this out this year, it's going to be old-hat."

== Critical reception ==
Professional ratings
Review scores
Source	Rating
Allmusic	3.5/5 stars

On All About Jazz, Doug Collette said, "Redoubtable sideman to Bay Area notables including Hot Tuna and the New Riders of the Purple Sage, guitarist Michael Falzarano offers inspiration throughout his third CD that consolidates the talents that have proven so reliable over the years.... It's little surprise Falzarano's aided and abetted here by a star-studded cast of musicians, 'The Extended Family' to Falzarano.... The front man's amiable presence appears in tangible musicianly forms throughout the CD.... Michael Falzarano's greatest talent may be his ability to galvanize all the participants involved here. He is crucial in erecting the united front of a genuine band, giving another meaning altogether to the title We Are All One."

On Allmusic, William Ruhlmann wrote, "For his solo albums, of which this is the third, [Falzarano] has no trouble getting his friends to sit in. Here, those friends include the late master fiddler Vassar Clements, in some of his final recordings... Hot Tuna's (and Jefferson Airplane's) Jorma Kaukonen... Jefferson Starship's Pete Sears... the New Riders' pedal steel player Buddy Cage... and the Band's Garth Hudson... The guests provide some of the instrumental highlights of the disc, but they are only icing on the cake. For the most part, Falzarano leads ensembles anchored by Harvey Sorgen or Ray Grappone on drums, Steve Rust or Pete Bennett on bass, Melvin Seals or Jon Marshall Smith on organ, and Jimmy Eppard or Kerry Kearney on lead guitar. His leadership consists of his sturdy songwriting and singing in a countryish, bluesy vein that will be familiar to fans of the Band and the groups of which he's been a member. His adequate voice is in the conventional rusty, adenoidal style, his tunes are blues and rock staples, and his lyrics touch on the misunderstandings of love and the need for universal brotherhood."

Writing on Jambands.com, Brian Robbins said, "Past projects (the Memphis Pilgrims and the solo 2005 King James Sessions) have proven Michael's talent as a bandleader, but his latest release, We Are All One, is the best yet. And although the album features a revolving cast of characters recorded over a long period, it sounds like the result of a bunch of old friends sitting down one evening and going for it with the tape rolling.... Even though there's no one core group of musicians throughout the album, We Are All One is held together by the good Falzarano karma. This is definitely his album, no matter who sits in where — and, in the end, the man proves his point: given the chance, we are all one."

On KindWeb, Jud Conway wrote, "Somewhere between his busy schedule teaching guitar workshops and producing, recording, and performing with a veritable 'who's who' of jam band royalty, Falzarano has managed to release We Are All One, his third proper solo album, on Woodstock Records.... Having worked as a rhythm guitarist with or for many of the guest artists appearing on We Are All One, Falzarano promotes the solo project as a quasi-group effort, informally crediting the album to 'Michael Falzarano and Extended Family'.... In essence, because the basic tracks for We Are All One were recorded during multiple sessions and with numerous musicians over a period of several years, Falzarano was able to turn the tables on high-profile players and solicit their uninhibited support in helping him to realize his musical vision. Consequently, Michael Falzarano delivers one of the most compelling and organic albums in his extensive discography."

== Track listing ==
1. "Why I Love You I Can't Explain" (Michael Falzarano) – 4:08
2. "Sweet Marie" (Falzarano) – 3:19
3. "It's My Own Fault" (Falzarano) – 3:08
4. "Candy Man" (Reverend Gary Davis) – 3:57
5. "We Are All One" (Falzarano) – 3:43
6. "It's Just My Way" (Falzarano) – 3:56
7. "How Long Blues" (Leroy Carr) – 4:42
8. "New Shirt" (Falzarano) – 4:47
9. "When There's Two There's Trouble" (Falzarano) – 4:05
10. "Crazy Days" (Falzarano) – 5:18
11. "To Let the Fire Die" (Falzarano, Kerry Kearney) – 3:35
12. "We Are All One" (acoustic) (Falzarano, Kearney) – 3:14
13. "Last Train Out" (in memory of Allen Woody) (Falzarano) – 5:46
14. "Gonna Power Down Now" (instrumental) (Falzarano) – 3:41

== Personnel ==
- Michael Falzarano – guitar, lead vocals

Featuring

- Vassar Clements – fiddle
- Melvin Seals – Hammond organ
- Buddy Cage – pedal steel guitar
- Jorma Kaukonen – guitar
- Garth Hudson – keyboards
- Professor Louie – piano, Fender Rhodes piano, accordion, vocals
- Kerry Kearney – guitar
- Kane Daily – slide guitar
- Jimmy Fleming – mandolin
- Jimmy Eppard – guitar, vocals
- Dave Castiglione – saxophone

With

- Harvey Sorgen – drums
- Pete Sears – piano
- Jon Marshall Smith – Farfisa organ
- Ray Grappone – drums
- Peter Bennett – bass
- Steve Rust – bass
- Chris Matheos – bass
- Charlie Wolfe – harmonica
- Eileen Murphy – drums
- Frank Celenza – bass
- Vicki Bell – vocals
- Klyph Black – bass, vocals
- Tommy Circosta – vocals
- Miss Marie – vocals
- Mike Dunn – bass
- David Malachowski – guitar
- Gary Burke – drums

Production

- Michael Falzarano – producer, mixing
- Jon Marshall Smith – mixing
- Professor Louie – recording
- Vicki Bell – recording
- Dave Cook – recording
- Mike Birnbaum – recording
- Kevin Morgan Studio – art, layout
