= A Kaleidoscope Christmas =

Studio album by Michael Falzarano and Extended Family
- Released: November 24, 2020
- Studio: Chris Laybourne Studio
- Genres: Country rock, Christmas
- Label: Hypnotation
- Producer: Michael Falzarano

Michael Falzarano chronology
I Got Blues for Ya (2014)	A Kaleidoscope Christmas (2020)

A Kaleidoscope Christmas is an album by Michael Falzarano, credited to "Michael Falzarano and Extended Family". It contains eleven original Christmas-themed songs, plus a jam band-style cover of "Jingle Bells". It features Jorma Kaukonen, Jack Casady, Pete Sears, Jeff Mattson, Jason Crosby, and Kerry Kearney. It was released on November 24, 2020.

Michael Falzarano is a guitarist, singer, and songwriter. He is perhaps best known as a member of Hot Tuna and the New Riders of the Purple Sage.

== Critical reception ==
In Americana Highways John Apice wrote, "The foot-stomper swayin' music is arranged with expertise with illuminating performances. Nothing hokey-pokey – it's well-done & engaging. Few Christmas songs today match the classics from the '40s through the '60s but this is a worthy addition to that household.... This isn't your grandma's Bing Crosby or Johnny Mathis Christmas songbook except for maybe the lone cover "Jingle Bells", decorated brilliantly in a Hot Tuna decor."

In Glide Magazine Doug Collette said, "When is a seasonal album not a seasonal album? When the artist who made the record, in this case, the Michael Falzarano Extended Family, illustrates how the sentiments permeating the music are worth savoring at times beyond the holiday proper.... Michael Falzarano hardly hogs the spotlight here, but it’s clear he set the tone for these sessions with a distinct lack of artifice."

In American Blues Scene Don Wilcock wrote, "But wait. There's more, as they say on the TV ads. There's a Santa's sleigh full of 13 other great musicians including such San Francisco heavyweights as Jorma Kaukonen, Jack Casady, Pete Sears, and Professor Louie... Kaleidoscope Christmas is perfect for the veteran music aficionado who wants their seasonal cheer a little deeper than the usual kitsch."

On Grateful Web Nicole Lise Feingold said, "I especially like when renowned artists develop holiday albums. It demonstrates they aren't pretentious, but rather have a playful perspective appealing to a cross section of generations. Falzarano's twelve tunes build upon the genres of blues, country rock, boogie woogie and improvisation jams making the music familiar but still uniquely his."

== Track listing ==
All songs written by Michael Falzarano, except "Jingle Bells", traditional, arranged by Falzarano

1. "Yes It's Christmas Time Again"
2. "Ho Ho Ho"
3. "The Tree Nobody Wanted"
4. "Jingle Bells Jingle Jam"
5. "4:20, 12/24"
6. "The Eggnog Shuffle"
7. "It's a God Almighty World"
8. "A Psychedelic Cowboy Christmas"
9. "Bethlehem Requiem for Diana"
10. "Christmas Blues"
11. "Boogie Woogie Christmas"
12. "You're Still Standing"

== Personnel ==
Musicians

- Michael Falzarano – guitar, vocals
- Jorma Kaukonen – guitar
- Jack Casady – bass
- Pete Sears – Hammond organ, piano
- Jeff Mattson – guitar
- Jason Crosby – Hammond organ, piano, fiddle
- Kerry Kearney – guitar, slide guitar
- Tom Circosta – guitar, backup vocals
- Klyph Black – bass, backup vocals
- Dave Diamond – drums
- Clare Maloney – backup vocals
- Nate DeBrine – backup vocals
- Professor Louie – Hammond organ, clavinet, backup vocals
- Miss Marie – backup vocals
- Rob Wolfson – guitar
- Waynard Scheller – Hammond organ, Fender Rhodes piano
- Scott Guberman – Hammond organ, backup vocals

Production

- Produced by Michael Falzarano
- Mixing: Michael Falzarano, Dan Skye
- Mastering: Toby Mountain
- Cover art: Kamala Towns
- Layout: Russ Paladino
