= Splashdown (Hot Tuna album) =

Live album by Hot Tuna
- Released: 1984
- Recorded: July 24, 1975 on WQIV-FM, New York City
- Genre: Blues rock
- Length: 35:00
- Label: Relix Records
- Producer: Leslie D. Kippel

Hot Tuna chronology
Final Vinyl (1979)	Splashdown (1984)	Historic Live Tuna (1985)

Splashdown is a Hot Tuna album released in 1984 containing the tracks from a previously unreleased live acoustic performance that had been played on the short-lived radio station WQIV in the mid-1970s. During the recording, news of the Apollo–Soyuz mission returning to Earth after the first USA-USSR rendezvous in space reached the station, and the astronauts' radio transmissions were played at the same time as Jorma and Jack continued with "Police Dog Blues." The transmissions mixed with the song were preserved for this release as the last track of side 1. The album was Hot Tuna's first release on Relix Records, and one of the first Relix releases. Jorma Kaukonen was signed on as a solo artist to the label as well. In 1997 an expanded version of the album was released as Splashdown Two.

== Critical reception ==
Professional ratings
Review scores
Source	Rating
Allmusic	3/5 stars

On AllMusic, William Ruhlmann wrote, "At the time, Hot Tuna recently had released its America's Choice album, but this set harks back to the group's 1970 debut album, Hot Tuna, both in its acoustic format and in the selection of mostly folk-blues standards. The performance also has an informality and intimacy that rivals the debut. Casual fans are likely to find the album redundant, but more fervent followers rejoiced when this album appeared nine years after the broadcast occurred and five years after the group's apparent demise."

== Track listing ==
=== Side A ===
1. "Death Don't Have No Mercy" (Rev. Gary Davis) – 6:43
2. "I Am the Light of This World" (Davis) – 4:00
3. "Embryonic Journey" (Jorma Kaukonen) – 2:05
4. "Police Dog Blues" (Blind Blake) / "Splashdown" (U. S. Astronauts) – 4:04

=== Side B ===
1. "Keep Your Lamps Trimmed and Burning" (Davis) – 2:57
2. "I Know You Rider" (Traditional) – 5:09
3. "Keep On Truckin'" (Bob Carleton) – 4:15
4. "Candy Man" (Davis) – 5:47

== Personnel ==
- Jorma Kaukonen – acoustic guitar, vocals
- Jack Casady – bass

=== Production ===
- Toni A. Brown – liner notes
- Maureen Hunter – cover art
- Leslie D. Kippel – photo of Jorma, record concept
- Dave Patrick – photo of Jack
- Brooklyn Bridge Publications – layout
- Barry Glassberg – tape

== Notes ==
- Splashdown (Vinyl back cover). Hot Tuna. Brooklyn: Relix Records. 1984. RRLP-2004.
