= Jimmie Strothers =

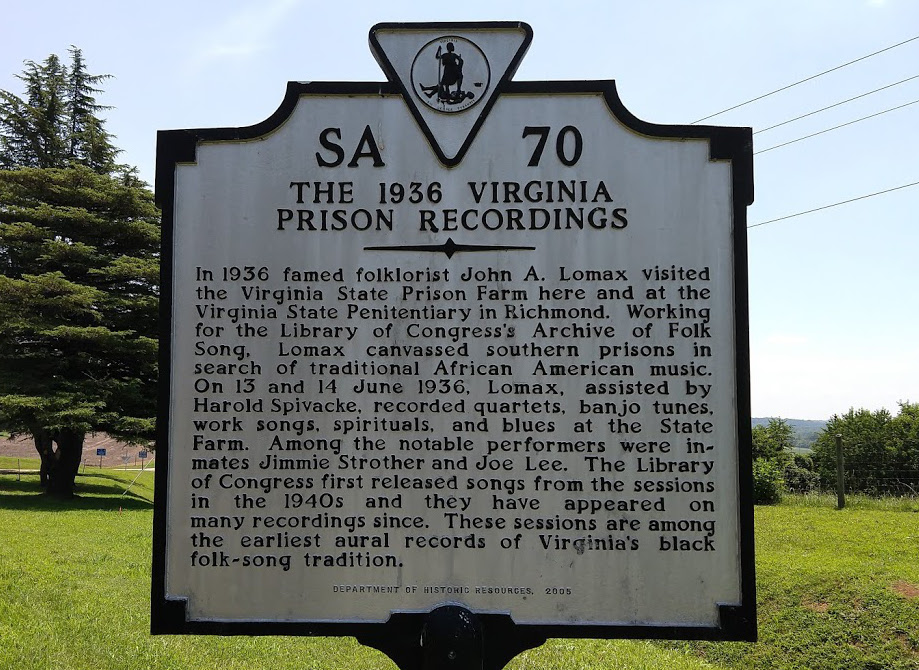
Virginia Historical Marker near the entrance to the former Virginia State Prison Farm (present-day James River Work Center) describing recordings of performances by Strothers and other inmates of the facility.

James Lee Strother (March 1883 – died after 1942?), was an American folk musician active in the 1930s and 1940s.

He was born in Madison, Virginia. He performed in medicine shows, and, after being blinded in a mine explosion, made a living as a musician, singing and playing guitar and banjo. In 1910, he lived in Baltimore, Maryland, and in 1918 was in Culpeper, Virginia. Alan Lomax recorded several performances by Strothers through his documentation of American music for the Library of Congress. Strothers made his recordings of thirteen songs in June 1936, while imprisoned at the Virginia State Farm for killing his wife, Blanche Green. He was released from prison in 1939. In 1942, he is thought to have been living in Achsar, Madison County, Virginia; there are no records of his death.

Strothers' recordings, some performed with fellow inmate Joe Lee, included both secular songs (including the bawdy "Poontang Little, Poontang Small") and versions of hymns. Influential recordings by Strothers include his versions of "Cripple Creek" and "Good Shepherd", the latter entitled "The Blood-Strained Banders" on the Lomax recording. Strothers's version of "Good Shepherd" was the basis for the Jefferson Airplane's recording on their album Volunteers.
