= Village Music =

Independent record store

- Company type: Music retailer
- Founded: 1940s
- Headquarters: Mill Valley United States
- Owner: John Goddard
- Website: www.villagemusic.com

Village Music was a record store in Mill Valley, California owned by John Goddard. It was nationally recognized for its extensive collection of old, rare and specialty records. Village Music was also known for its in-store performances and anniversary parties at the Sweetwater Saloon by well-known musicians who were also Village Music store customers. A documentary about the store's history and the surrounding music community, Village Music: Last of the Great Record Stores, was released in 2012. The store closed in 2007.

== History ==
Village Music opened as a mom‐and‐pop music store in 1960 in the Sequoia Theater building, and moved the following year to 9 East Blithedale Ave, where it remained until closing. John Goddard was born in Mill Valley and in 1957, at the age of 13, he started working at the store's progenitor, a branch of San Rafael-based Marin Music Center. Goddard purchased Village Music in 1968.

The store was known for its extensive collection of old, rare, and specialty records and rare memorabilia covered almost every inch of the walls and ceiling. Items such as Robert Johnson's gold record award, Janis Joplin's police mug shot, and Howlin' Wolf's first royalty check were hung on the walls.

Goddard published an open letter about the closing of Village Music in September 2007.

== Live music events ==
Goddard held twice-yearly parties at the nearby Sweetwater Saloon and invited his favorite blues and R&B performers to perform in front of packed invite-only guests.

Some of the notable musicians who performed or attended:

- Jerry Garcia and Elvis Costello performing with guitarist James Burton from Elvis Presley's band.
- Carlos Santana with John Lee Hooker, bluesman Albert Collins, guitarist Ry Cooder and the blues musician Robert Ward.
- Steve Miller, Bonnie Raitt and Huey Lewis watching 1960s soul singers Howard Tate and Bettye LaVette perform.
- Blues singer Charles Brown, Hank Ballard and the Midnighters, jazz vocalist Jimmy Scott, gospel group The Fairfield Four, Pop Staples, soul singers Otis Clay and Ann Peebles.
- Jerry Garcia and David Grisman did their first joint performance.

== Documentary ==
Village Music: Last of the Great Record Stores, a documentary film by Gillian Grisman and Monroe Grisman (daughter and son of San Francisco Bay Area musician David Grisman) debuted at the Mill Valley Film Festival in October 2012. The concert film tells the story of the birth of Village Music through the timeline of the final days of the closing of the store by its owner, John Goddard. The film documents Sweetwater Music Hall, and the music community in Mill Valley in the late 1960s through the closing of Village Music in 2007 and contains performances by Elvis Costello, Bob Weir, Ry Cooder, Nick Lowe, John Sebastian, Dan Hicks, Huey Lewis, Bonnie Raitt, John Lee Hooker, Pop Staples, Jerry Garcia, and Carlos Santana.

== Notable quotes ==
"Some of my best discoveries have been made in what may be the greatest record collector store in the world: Village Music in Mill Valley. Any shop that confronts you with its own ever changing 'Hall of Fame' (which might include a Lester Young, The Fairfield Four, some Bill Monroe and the great Otis Rush Anthologies) and a rack called 'Sometimes a Cover Is Enough,' featuring such classics as 'Music for Sleepwalkers,' must be doing something right"

-Elvis Costello, from the liner notes to his 1995 studio album, Kojak Variety
