= Street of Dreams (1932 song) =

"Street of Dreams" is a song and foxtrot composed in 1932 by Victor Young, with lyrics by Sam M. Lewis. There were three successful recordings of the song in 1933 by Guy Lombardo, Ben Selvin and Bing Crosby.

== Notable recordings ==
- Tony Bennett – for his album With Love (1972)
- Bobby Caldwell for the album Blue Condition (1996)
- Russ Columbo (1932)
- Bing Crosby (recorded December 9, 1932 with the Brunswick Studio Orchestra. Assessed by Joel Whitburn as achieving the No. 13 spot in the charts of the day).
- Doris Day - The Love Album (recorded in 1967, but released in 1994).
- Tommy Dorsey (1942) This reached No. 17 in the Billboard charts.
- Ella Fitzgerald - Ella Swings Gently with Nelson (1962)
- Earl Grant - Trade Winds (1964), instrumental version
- Grant Green - Street of Dreams (1964)
- Scott Hamilton - Street of Dreams (2019)
- The Ink Spots (1942)
- Peggy Lee - recorded June 7, 1956, and included on the album Dream Street.
- Guy Lombardo (1933) (Assessed by Joel Whitburn as achieving the No. 5 spot in the charts of the day)
- Patti LuPone (1980) - Patti LuPone at Les Mouches (released 2008)
- Johnny Mathis - Johnny Mathis (1956)
- Marian McPartland - At the Hickory House (1955)
- Lou Rawls - recorded 25 May 1967 for his album That's Lou.
- Frank Sinatra - Sinatra at the Sands with Count Basie (1966), Trilogy: Past Present Future (1980)
- Sarah Vaughan - included in the album After Hours (1955)
- Lee Wiley - Night in Manhattan (1950),
