= Live in Japan (Hot Tuna album) =

Live album by Hot Tuna
- Released: 1997 (original); 2004 (re-release)
- Recorded: February 20th, 1997 at Stove's, Yokohama, Japan
- Genre: Blues rock
- Label: Relix Records (original); Eagle Records (re-release)
- Producer: Michael Falzarano; Jorma Kaukonen (exec.)

Hot Tuna chronology
| Splashdown Two (1997) | Live in Japan (1997) | The Best of Hot Tuna (1998) |

Alternative cover
- Cover art of 2004 remastered release

Live in Japan is a live album by Hot Tuna recorded in 1997 in Yokohama, Japan. Originally the band planned to play an electric set as part of their Japanese tour, but the venue in Yokohama was too small (only holding fifty people) and there wasn't any room for an electric setup. The band played acoustic, and afterwards Jack Casady suggested to Jorma Kaukonen that the recording was good enough for a new live album. Michael Falzarano and Kaukonen listened to the tape and decided that Casady was right, and a new album was released. The album was Hot Tuna's last release on Relix Records. In 2004 Eagle Records remastered the album and re-released it with previously unreleased performances of "Parchman Farm", "Follow the Drinking Gourd", "Keep Your Lamps Trimmed & Burning" and "Folsom Prison." Three of the tracks from the initial release were dropped from the remaster: "Hesitation Blues", "Candy Man" and "Keep on Truckin'".

== 1997 Relix Records track listing ==
1. "Hesitation Blues" (Rev. Gary Davis) – 5:33
2. "Walkin' Blues" (Robert Johnson) – 5:01
3. "True Religion" (Traditional, arranged by Jorma Kaukonen) – 5:43
4. "Been So Long" (Kaukonen) – 3:51
5. "Uncle Sam Blues" (Traditional, arranged by Kaukonen) – 5:42
6. "Vampire Woman" (Spark Plug Smith) – 2:54
7. "Candy Man" (Davis) – 7:57
8. "Let Us Get Together Right Down Here" (Davis) – 2:59
9. "Third Week in the Chelsea" (Kaukonen) – 5:05
10. "99 Year Blues" (Julius Daniels) – 7:02
11. "Ice Age" (Kaukonen) – 6:38
12. "San Francisco Bay Blues" (Jesse Fuller) – 4:24
13. "Mann's Fate" (Kaukonen) – 6:08
14. "Keep On Truckin'" (Traditional, arranged by B. Carleton) – 4:29

== 2004 Eagle Records track listing ==
1. "Walkin' Blues" (Robert Johnson) – 5:16
2. "Parchman Farm" (Mose Allison) – 5:36
3. "True Religion" (Traditional, arranged by Jorma Kaukonen) – 5:19
4. "Been So Long" (Kaukonen) – 3:52
5. "Uncle Sam Blues" (Traditional, arranged by Kaukonen) – 5:11
6. "Vampire Woman" (Spark Plug Smith) – 2:58
7. "Follow the Drinking Gourd" (Traditional, arranged by Kaukonen) – 5:05
8. "Keep Your Lamps Trimmed & Burning" (Rev. Gary Davis) – 4:19
9. "Let Us Get Together Right Down Here" (Davis) – 2:59
10. "Third Week in the Chelsea" (Kaukonen) – 5:05
11. "99 Year Blues" (Julius Daniels) – 6:23
12. "Ice Age" (Kaukonen) – 6:38
13. "San Francisco Bay Blues" (Jesse Fuller) – 4:25
14. "Folsom Prison Blues" (Johnny Cash) – 4:03
15. "Mann's Fate" (Kaukonen) – 6:08

== Personnel ==
- Jorma Kaukonen – lead guitar, vocals
- Jack Casady – bass
- Michael Falzarano – rhythm guitar
- Pete Sears – keyboards
- Harvey Sorgen – drums, percussion

=== Production ===
- Rick Sanchez – live mix & recordist
- Jon Smith – editor, engineer
- Michael Falzarano – producer
- Jorma Kaukonen – executive producer, liner notes
- Post Production done at Jorma's Hillside Farms Studio at the Fur Peace Ranch, Darwin, Ohio
- Ian R. Brand at Disc Makers – design
- GABRA Management– management
- Steve Martin, The Agency Group – booking agent
