= Fillmore: The Last Days =

Live album by various artists
- Released: June 1972
- Recorded: June 29 – July 4, 1971
- Genre: Rock
- Length: 146:31
- Label: Columbia
- Producers: Bruce Good, Jeffrey Cohen

Fillmore: The Last Days is a live album, recorded at the Fillmore West in San Francisco, California from June 29 to July 4, 1971. It contains performances by 14 different bands, mostly from the San Francisco Bay Area, including Santana, the Grateful Dead, Hot Tuna, Quicksilver Messenger Service, and the New Riders of the Purple Sage. It was released by Columbia Records in June 1972 as a three-disc LP. It was re-released by Epic Records in 1991 as a two-disc CD.

Fillmore: The Last Days documents the final run of concerts at the Fillmore West, which closed after these shows. The concerts were promoted by Bill Graham, who ran the Fillmore West, and before that its predecessor music venue the Fillmore, starting in November 1965.

The original triple LP was packaged as a box set. It included a 7-inch, 33⅓ rpm EP record, containing an interview with Bill Graham. It also included a commemorative booklet with liner notes by Graham, an illustrated essay about the Fillmore concert posters, and a listing of every concert at the Fillmore and Fillmore West. The box set also included a reproduction of the concert poster for the final run of shows, and an actual Fillmore ticket stub.

The CD version of the album includes the Bill Graham interview from the 7-inch record. It also contains a small-sized version of the commemorative booklet.

== Film ==
Fillmore, a music documentary film showcasing the same run of concerts, was released on June 14, 1972. It was released on DVD on June 9, 2009. In addition to the concert material, the movie shows the emergence of the San Francisco music scene in the 1960s, and includes extensive footage of Bill Graham.

Fillmore: The Last Days is not a soundtrack album. Eight songs are included in both the film and the album, but eight songs are in the film and not on the album, and twelve songs are on the album but not in the film.

== Other albums ==
Several other albums contain music that was recorded at the June 30 to July 4, 1971 concerts at the Fillmore West.

Hot Tuna's 1985 album Historic Live Tuna includes three songs from the July 3 Fillmore West concert. Their 1996 album Classic Hot Tuna Electric consists of eight songs from that show. Their 2014 album Live at the Fillmore West: 3rd July 1971 contains their entire performance.

The 1998 CD reissue of Santana's 1971 album Santana III includes three bonus tracks from the July 4 show. The 2006 "Legacy Edition" of the CD has a second disc with all 11 songs that they played at the concert.

The 2003 CD reissue of the 1971 studio album New Riders of the Purple Sage has three bonus tracks from the band's Fillmore West performance.

== Critical reception ==
Professional ratings
Review scores
Source	Rating
Allmusic	3/5 stars

Allmusic praised Fillmore: The Last Days, saying "When the venerable San Francisco rock and roll mecca the Fillmore West packed it in on the Fourth of July 1971 an era in pop music history had also passed.... The discs feature a who's who of rock music circa 1971, most if not all of whom began their collective journeys in the Bay Area music scene at the time. The Grateful Dead ("Casey Jones" and "Johnny B. Goode"), Quicksilver Messenger Service ("Fresh Air" and "Mojo"), as well as Santana ("Incident at Neshabur" and "In a Silent Way") all make strong showings... Fillmore: The Last Days includes some amazing performances from It's a Beautiful Day ("White Bird") as well as the stunningly powerful "Baby's Calling Me Home" by Boz Scaggs... plus a definitive version of "Keep Your Lamps Trimmed and Burnin'" from Hot Tuna — who are the only representatives from the Jefferson Airplane, perhaps the one San Francisco band who is most conspicuously absent from the proceedings."

Hooterollin' Around was much more critical, writing "Fairly or not, the Fillmore album sounded kind of anemic in 1972.... Only Santana really stands out, with "Incident at Neshabur" and a unique version of Miles Davis's "In a Silent Way".... I think Graham and his producers thought small and picked the wrong tracks. While I hardly think the week of June 29 – July 4, 1971 was the best week of San Francisco music, there was plenty of fine music played. I'm not guessing — almost all of it circulates on tape in one form or another. With the exception of Santana and arguably a few other tracks, I think the producers made very poor choices. They consistently chose the simplest and most accessible songs by each artist, and for the angular nature of Fillmore music that was not a good criteria."

== LP track listing ==
Side 1

1. Introduction (John Walker) – 2:12
2. "Hello Friends" (Barbara Mauritz) – Lamb – 3:21
3. "So Fine" (Johnny Otis) – Elvin Bishop Group – 3:52
4. "Party till the Cows Come Home" (Elvin Bishop) – Elvin Bishop Group – 3:16
5. "Pana" (Abel Zarate, Arcelio Garcia) – Malo – 8:27

Side 2

1. "Poppa Can Play" (Bill Champlin) – Sons of Champlin – 5:00
2. "White Bird" (David LaFlamme) – It's a Beautiful Day – 9:07
3. "Fresh Air" (Dino Valenti) – Quicksilver Messenger Service – 4:47
4. "Mojo" (Valenti) – Quicksilver Messenger Service – 6:02

Side 3

1. Introduction (Bill Graham) – 0:58
2. "Back on the Streets Again" (Emilio Castillo, Stephen Kupka) – Tower of Power – 6:35
3. "Baby's Callin' Me Home" (Boz Scaggs) – Boz Scaggs – 8:59
4. "I Just Want to Make Love to You" (Willie Dixon) – Cold Blood – 6:28

Side 4

1. "Passion Flower" (Lynn Hughes) – Stoneground – 3:53
2. "Henry" (John Dawson) – New Riders of the Purple Sage – 4:12
3. "Casey Jones" (Jerry Garcia, Robert Hunter) – Grateful Dead – 6:30
4. "Johnny B. Goode" (Chuck Berry) – Grateful Dead – 4:05

Side 5

1. Introduction (Graham) – 0:49
2. "Keep Your Lamps Trimmed and Burning" (Reverend Gary Davis) – Hot Tuna – 7:47
3. "Incident at Neshabur" (Alberto Gianquinto, Carlos Santana) – Santana – 5:39
4. "In a Silent Way" (Joe Zawinul, Miles Davis) – Santana – 7:58

Side 6

1. "We Gonna Rock" (Taj Mahal, Scaggs, Bishop) – Various artists – 6:46
2. "Long and Tall" (Mahal, Scaggs, Bishop) – Various artists – 12:32
3. Goodbye/"Greensleeves" (Graham/Traditional) – 3:36

7–inch EP

- Words with Bill Graham – side A – 8:36
- Words with Bill Graham – side B – 8:25

== CD track listing ==
Disc 1

1. Introduction (Walker) – 2:12
2. "Hello Friends" (Mauritz) – Lamb – 3:16
3. "So Fine" (Otis) – Elvin Bishop Group – 3:58
4. "Party till the Cows Come Home" (Bishop) – Elvin Bishop Group – 3:07
5. "Pana" (Zarate, Garcia) – Malo – 8:01
6. "Poppa Can Play" (Champlin) – Sons of Champlin – 4:57
7. "White Bird" (LaFlamme) – It's a Beautiful Day – 9:02
8. "Fresh Air" (Valenti) – Quicksilver Messenger Service – 4:44
9. "Mojo" (Valenti) – Quicksilver Messenger Service – 4:56
10. Introduction (Graham) – 0:59
11. "Back on the Streets Again" (Emilio Castillo, Stephen Kupka) – Tower of Power – 6:33
12. "Baby's Callin' Me Home" (Scaggs) – Boz Scaggs – 8:54
13. "I Just Want to Make Love to You" (Dixon) – Cold Blood – 6:18
14. "Passion Flower" (Lynn Hughes) – Stoneground – 3:53
15. "Henry" (Dawson) – New Riders of the Purple Sage – 4:06

Disc 2

1. "Casey Jones" (Garcia, Hunter) – Grateful Dead – 5:58
2. "Johnny B. Goode" (Berry) – Grateful Dead – 3:57
3. Introduction (Graham) – 0:51
4. "Keep Your Lamps Trimmed and Burning" (Rev. Davis) – Hot Tuna – 7:42
5. "Incident at Neshabur" (Gianquinto, Santana) – Santana – 5:37
6. "In a Silent Way" (Zawinul, Davis) – Santana – 7:50
7. "We Gonna Rock" (Mahal, Scaggs, Bishop) – Various artists – 6:45
8. "Long and Tall" (Mahal, Scaggs, Bishop) – Various artists – 12:24
9. Goodbye/"Greensleeves" (Graham/Traditional) – 3:32
10. Words with Bill Graham (16:59)

== Personnel ==
=== Bands ===
- Santana (July 4)
- Grateful Dead (July 2)
- New Riders of the Purple Sage (July 2)
- It's a Beautiful Day (July 1)
- Taj Mahal (July 1)
- Boz Scaggs (June 30, July 1)
- Elvin Bishop Group (July 1)
- Tower of Power (July 4)
- Malo (June 29)
- Quicksilver Messenger Service (July 3)
- Cold Blood (June 30)
- Stoneground (June 30)
- Sons of Champlin (July 3, on the poster as 'Yogi Phlegm')
- Lamb (July 1)

=== Production ===
- Produced by Bruce Good, Jeffrey Cohen
- Executive producer: Bill Graham
- Engineer: Jerry Zatkin
- Recording: Nigel Noble
- Mixing for Lamb: Fred Catero
- Mixing for Santana: Mike Larner
- Recording for Santana: Glenn Kolotkin
- Mixing for Grateful Dead: Stephen Barncard
- Mixing for Quicksilver Messenger Service: John Wilson
- Mixing for Hot Tuna: Hot Tuna
- Package design: Ed Lee
- Liner notes: Bill Graham
- CD remastering: Mark Wilder
- CD project director: Gary Pacheco
