= Pair a Dice Found =

Studio album by Hot Tuna
- Released: November 2, 1990
- Genre: Blues rock
- Label: Epic
- Producer: Jorma Kaukonen

Hot Tuna chronology
Historic Live Tuna (1985)	Pair a Dice Found (1990)	Live at Sweetwater (1992)

Singles from Pair a Dice Found
- 1. "Eve of Destruction" Released: November 26, 1990

Professional ratings
Review scores
Source	Rating
Allmusic	2/5 stars

Pair a Dice Found is an album by the American blues rock band Hot Tuna. Released in 1990, it was their first studio album since Hoppkorv in 1976.

== Background ==
In 1989, Jefferson Airplane reunited for a tour and eponymous album on Epic Records. In between sets, lead guitarist Jorma Kaukonen and bassist Jack Casady performed as Hot Tuna. After attending a show and seeing the positive reaction to Hot Tuna, Epic executives offered them a recording contract. Kaukonen produced the album, and described the sessions as easy-going, with songs requiring minimal takes. He and Casady were joined by Michael Falzarano on rhythm guitar and Harvey Sorgen on drums.

Compared with previous albums, Kaukonen has relatively few writing credits, with the rest made up of blues covers, songs from contemporary writers, and originals from newcomer Falzarano. It also features a cover of the 1960s protest song "Eve of Destruction," intended as a comment on the then-current Gulf War. (A cover of "Endless Sleep" was also recorded during the sessions, and later released on Live at Sweetwater Two.) In a press interview, Kaukonen described the choice of material: "I picked out songs I can still relate to. My whole era of songwriting back in the '70s, I sort of refer to as the 'canyons of your mind' songwriting school, though, and I don't find it easy to relate to those bizarre, introspective songs anymore."

== Track listing ==
1. "It's Alright with Me" (Jorma Kaukonen)
2. "Parchman Farm" (Mose Allison)
3. "Urban Moon" (Randall Bramblett)
4. "Eve of Destruction" (P. F. Sloan)
5. "AK-47" (Michael Falzarano)
6. "Shot in the Act" (Scott Mathews, Ron Nagle)
7. "Brand New Toy" (Falzarano)
8. "To Be with You" (Falzarano)
9. "Flying in the Face of Mr. Blue" (Bramblett, Davis Causey, Bucky Jones)
10. "Love Gone Flat" (Falzarano)
11. "Bulletproof Vest" (Falzarano)
12. "Ken Takes a Lude" (Kaukonen)
13. "San Francisco Bay Blues" (Jesse Fuller)
14. "Happy Turtle Song" (Kaukonen)

== Personnel ==
- Jorma Kaukonen – vocals, lead guitars, rhythm guitars, lap steel guitar, dobro
- Jack Casady – bass, 4-string guitar, 5-string guitar, fretless guitar, background vocals
- Michael Falzarano – rhythm guitar
- Harvey Sorgen – drums
- Galen Underwood – keyboards, background vocals, rhythm guitar on "Urban Moon", "Shot in the Act", and "Flying in the Face of Mr. Blue", sequenced percussion on "Urban Moon"

Additional personnel

- Rick Danko – background vocals on "Parchman Farm" and "Eve of Destruction"
- The Phantoms (Charlie Staxx, Joe Veillette, Jane Veillette) – background vocals on "Urban Moon", "Brand New Toy", "To Be With You", and "Flying in the Face of Mr. Blue"
- Vanessa Lillian, Ginger Lee, Rick Sanchez – background vocals on "Bulletproof Vest"

=== Production ===
- Jorma Kaukonen – producer
- Rick Sanchez – co-producer, engineer, mixdown at Beartracks
- Michael Caplan – executive producer
- Harvey Leeds – executive producer
- Galen Underwood – production assistance
- Ira Wilkes – production coordination
- Harvey Sorgen – second engineer at Dreamland
- John Yates – second engineer at Dreamland
- Doug Rose – second engineer
- Carl Studna – cover photo
- Vanessa Lillian – art direction
- Howard Fritzson – design
