= Embryonic Journey (album) =

Studio album by Jorma Kaukonen and Tom Constanten
- Released: September 1994
- Recorded: August 1993
- Studio: Sound Tek Studios, New York City
- Genre: Rock; Folk rock Instrumental
- Length: 31:57
- Label: Relix
- Producer: L. D. Kippel (executive); Michael Falzarano

Jorma Kaukonen and Tom Constanten chronology
Magic (1985)	Embryonic Journey (1994)	Magic Two (1995)

Professional ratings
Review scores
Source	Rating
Allmusic	4/5 stars

Embryonic Journey is an album by Jorma Kaukonen, the lead guitarist for Jefferson Airplane / Hot Tuna, and former Grateful Dead keyboardist Tom Constanten. The album consists of studio sessions for the recording of Kaukonen's instrumental Embryonic Journey for the Constanten album Morning Dew. The song had originally appeared on Jefferson Airplane's Surrealistic Pillow album in 1967. A version of the song employing MIDI technology was added as a bonus track.

== Track listing ==
1. "Embryonic Journey: Jorma Solo" – 4:36
2. "Embryonic Journey Jorma and Tom Take No. 1" – 2:44
3. "Embryonic Journey: Different Voicing" – 3:06
4. "Embryonic Journey: Going for It" – 2:30
5. "Embryonic Journey: Doing a Quick One" – 3:10
6. "Embryonic Journey: One, Two, Three, Four" – 2:49
7. "Embryonic Journey: Take 3.14159" – 2:28
8. "Embryonic Journey: Another One, Two, Three, Four" – 2:31
9. "Embryonic Journey: Jorma and Tom One More Take" – 2:34
10. "Embryonic Journey: The Perfect Embryonic Journey" – 3:15
11. "Embryonic Journey: A MIDI Orchestration Embryonic Journey" – 2:14

== Personnel ==
- Jorma Kaukonen – acoustic guitar
- Tom Constanten – piano

== Production ==
- L. D. Kippel – executive producer, photography
- Michael Falzarano – producer
- Jan Betts – art
- Recorded at Sound Tek Studios, 1780 Broadway, New York
