= The Land of Heroes =

Studio album by Jorma Kaukonen
- Released: September 15, 1995
- Label: Relix Records
- Producer: Michael Falzarano

Jorma Kaukonen chronology
Magic Two (1995)	The Land of Heroes (1995)	Christmas (1996)

Professional ratings
Review scores
Source	Rating
Allmusic	3/5 stars

The Land of Heroes is a Jorma Kaukonen studio album recorded and released in 1995. It was his first new solo album since the mid-1980s. The album incorporated the work of several other musicians, including Michael Falzarano, who had joined Hot Tuna and produced remastered versions of Kaukonen's older Relix Records vinyl releases. Falzarano also produced the new album, and co-wrote some tracks.

== Track listing ==
1. "Re-Enlisment Blues" (James Jones, Robert Wells, Fred Karger) – 4:09
2. "Trial by Fire" (Jorma Kaukonen) – 4:02
3. "Do Not Go Gentle" (Kaukonen) – 3:31
4. "From the Land of Heroes" (Kaukonen) – 2:52
5. "It's a God Almighty World" (Michael Falzarano) – 3:36
6. "Follow the Drinking Gourd" (Traditional) – 4:52
7. "Banks of the River" (Rev. Gary Davis) – 3:33
8. "Judge, I'm Not Sorry" (Falzarano) – 4:03
9. "Dark Train" (Kaukonen, Falzarano) – 5:06
10. "Have More Faith in Jesus" (Davis) – 2:47

== Personnel ==
- Jorma Kaukonen – guitars, vocals, dobro, lap steel guitar
- Michael Falzarano – rhythm guitar, mandolin
- Fred Bogert – bass, keyboards, vocals
- Catheryn Craig – vocals

=== Production ===
- Michael Falzarano – producer
