= Live at Sweetwater Two =

Live album by Hot Tuna
- Released: 1993 (original); 2004 (re-release)
- Recorded: January 27 and 28, 1992 at Sweetwater Station, Mill Valley, CA
- Genre: Blues rock
- Labels: Relix Records (original); Eagle Records (re-release)

Hot Tuna chronology
Live at Sweetwater (1992)	Live at Sweetwater Two (1993)	Classic Hot Tuna Acoustic (1996)

Alternative cover
- Cover art of 2004 remastered release

Professional ratings
Review scores
Source	Rating
AllMusic	(not rated)

Live at Sweetwater Two is a live Hot Tuna album recorded at the same time as the album, Live at Sweetwater, but contains no tracks from the previous release. The live performances feature Bob Weir of the Grateful Dead, blues-singer Maria Muldaur, and keyboardist Pete Sears. Also included is the previously unreleased studio track "Endless Sleep" from the Pair a Dice Found sessions. In 2004 Eagle Records re-mastered and re-released the album with several added tracks, and without the studio track included.

== 1993 Relix Records track listing ==
1. "Hesitation Blues" (Traditional) – 5:28
2. "Dime for Beer" (Jelly Roll Morton) – 3:01
3. "Death Don't Have No Mercy" (Rev. Gary Davis) – 5:23
4. "99 Year Blues" (Julius Daniels) – 4:54
5. "San Francisco Bay Blues" (Jesse Fuller) – 4:03
6. "Blue Moon of Kentucky" (Monroe) – 4:44
7. "Ain't Got No Home" (Guthrie) – 4:21
8. "Good Morning Little Schoolgirl" (Traditional) – 5:21
9. "Third Week in the Chelsea" (Jorma Kaukonen) – 4:34
10. "My AK-47" (Michael Falzarano) – 5:29
11. "Parchman Farm" (Mose Allison) – 9:13
12. "Endless Sleep" (Reynolds) – 3:13

== 2004 Eagle Records track listing ==
1. "Hesitation Blues" (Traditional) – 5:24
2. "Dime for Beer" (Jelly Roll Morton) – 2:54
3. "Trial by Fire" (Jorma Kaukonen) – 4:30
4. "Death Don't Have No Mercy" (Rev. Gary Davis) – 5:23
5. "99 Year Blues" (Julius Daniels) – 4:54
6. "San Francisco Bay Blues" (Jesse Fuller) – 4:01
7. "Too Many Years" (Kaukonen) – 3:47
8. "Blue Moon of Kentucky" (Monroe) – 4:33
9. "Ain't Got No Home" (Guthrie) – 4:20
10. "Good Morning Little Schoolgirl" (Traditional) – 5:16
11. "Walkin' Blues" (Robert Johnson) – 4:14
12. "Third Week in the Chelsea" (Kaukonen) – 4:36
13. "My AK-47" (Michael Falzarano) – 5:29
14. "Parchman Farm" (Mose Allison) – 7:41
15. "Folsom Prison Blues" (Johnny Cash) – 6:10

== Personnel ==
=== Live tracks ===
- Jorma Kaukonen – lead guitar, vocals, Dobro, table steel guitar
- Jack Casady – bass
- Michael Falzarano – rhythm guitar, vocals, mandolin

==== Additional personnel ====
- Keith Corsaan (2004 release) – saxophone
- Maria Muldaur – vocals, tambourine
- Pete Sears – piano, accordion
- Happy Traum – guitar, vocals
- Bob Weir – guitar, vocals

=== Studio track ===
- Jorma Kaukonen – lead guitar, rhythm guitar, vocals
- Jack Casady – bass
- Michael Falzarano – rhythm guitar
- Harvey Sorgen – drums

=== Production ===
- Production team from Jorma's Hillside Farm Productions
- Rick Sanchez – engineer
- Ira Wilkes – king roadie and production coordination
- Remote truck at Sweetwater from The Plant Recording Studios
- Gabra Management – management
- Steve Martin (William Morris Agency) – booking agent
- Vanessa Lillian, Gabra Specialties – design layout
- Jorma Kaukonen, Jack Casady – liner notes
- Carl Studna – photography
- Recorded live at Sweetwater, Mill Valley, CA on January 27 and 28, 1992
