= Jorma (name) =

Jorma is a Finnish male given name. It was popular in Finland in the 1940s and 1950s. It is a Finnish version of the name Jeremiah. The name day is June 26.

== People with the name ==
- Jorma Etelälahti (born 1951), former Finnish Nordic combined skier
- Jorma Gallen-Kallela (1898–1939), Finnish artist
- Jorma Härkönen (born 1956), Finnish middle-distance runner
- Jorma Hynninen (born 1941), Finnish baritone
- Jorma Katrama (1936–2022), Finnish instrumentalist
- Jorma Kaukonen (born 1940), American blues, folk and rock guitarist
- Jorma Kinnunen (1941–2019), Finnish athlete
- Jorma Kortelainen (1932–2012), Finnish cross-country skier
- Jorma Ojaharju (1938–2011), author
- Jorma Ollila (born 1950), chairman and former CEO of Nokia Corporation
- Jorma Panula (born 1930), Finnish conductor, composer, and teacher of conducting
- Jorma "Jope" Ruonansuu (1964–2020), singer, comedian, actor
- Jorma Räty, Finnish weightlifter
- Jorma Sarvanto (1912–1963), Finnish Air Force pilot
- Jorma Taccone (born 1977), American writer, actor and director
- Jorma Tommila (born 1959), Finnish actor
- Jorma Valkama (1928–1962), Finnish athlete

== Fictional characters ==
- Jorma Kariluoto, a character from The Unknown Soldier novel by Väinö Linna
