= Jorma (album) =

Solo album by Jorma Kaukonen

Studio album by Jorma Kaukonen
- Released: October 22, 1979
- Recorded: 1979
- Studios: Filmways/Heider, San Francisco
- Genre: Folk rock
- Label: RCA
- Producers: Jorma Kaukonen, David Kahne

Jorma Kaukonen chronology
Quah (1974)	Jorma (1979)	Barbeque King (1981)

Jorma is the second solo album by the American musician Jorma Kaukonen, released in 1979. Hot Tuna had stopped touring in 1977 and Jack Casady had moved on to the band SVT. Bill Thompson and the staff that had managed Hot Tuna and still managed Jefferson Starship in 1979 continued to manage Kaukonen. David Kahne was hired to produce and the new solo album was released on RCA. The album consists of Jorma's own vocals and his own electric and acoustic guitar work with many original songs written by Kaukonen. The last track is a poem recited by Kaukonen with no instrumental backing.

== Critical reception ==
Professional ratings
Review scores
Source	Rating
The Star Press	B

The New York Daily News wrote that Kaukonen's "voice is appealing and his finger-style guitar playing is fantastic, as usual." The Star Press noted that "the format of only vocals and guitar wears a bit thin." The Calgary Albertan opined that "Kaukonen's weird nasal, whiny vocals blend well with the playing style."

== Track listing ==
All tracks composed by Jorma Kaukonen; except where indicated

Side one

1. "Straight Ahead" (Jorma Kaukonen, Bob Steeler) – 4:15
2. "Roads and Roads &" – 4:14
3. "Valley of Tears" – 4:47
4. "Song for the High Mountain" – 3:05

Side two

1. "Wolves and Lambs" – 3:30
2. "Too Long Out / Too Long In" – 5:14
3. "Requiem for an Angel" – 3:46
4. "Vampire Women" (Spark Plug Smith) – 3:27
5. "Da-Ga Da-Ga" (M. A. Numminen) – 1:25

== Personnel ==
- Jorma Kaukonen – guitars, vocals

Production

- Jorma Kaukonen – producer
- David Kahne – producer, engineer
- Pat (Maurice) Ieraci – production coordinator
- Wet Teeth M – cover design
- Doug Carter – cover design assistance
- Bob Steeler – street consultant
- Michael Casady – equipment
- Recorded and mixed at Filmways / Heider, San Francisco
- Mastered by John Golden, Kendun Recorders, Burbank

== Notes ==
- Jorma (Vinyl back cover). Jorma Kaukonen. New York City: RCA. 1979. AFL1-3446.
