= Too Many Years =

Studio album by Jorma Kaukonen
- Released: August 1998
- Label: Relix Records
- Producer: Jorma Kaukonen; Michael Falzarano

Jorma Kaukonen chronology
Christmas (1996)	Too Many Years (1998)	Jorma Kaukonen Trio Live (2001)

Professional ratings
Review scores
Source	Rating
Allmusic	3/5 stars

Too Many Years is a Jorma Kaukonen studio album released in August, 1998. It was his last studio album on Relix Records. Michael Falzarano returned to play guitar and help produce (as he did on the previous Kaukonen solo album). He also sang lead on several tracks. The keyboard work was now handled by former Jefferson Starship keyboardist Pete Sears, who had been playing with Hot Tuna since 1992. After this album, the three began to perform as the "Jorma Kaukonen Trio" and recorded a live album for Relix, Jorma Kaukonen Trio Live.

== Track listing ==
1. "Fools Blues" (Funny Papa Smith) – 4:36
2. "Big Town" (Ronnie Self) – 5:12
3. "Too Many Years" (Jorma Kaukonen) – 4:00
4. "Home of the Blues" (Johnny Cash, Glen Douglas, Lily McAlpin) – 3:14
5. "Nine Pound Hammer" (Traditional) – 3:45
6. "Gypsy Fire" (Michael Falzarano) – 5:46
7. "You Got to Move" (Fred McDowell) – 5:22
8. "Larue Larue" (Falzarano) – 3:29
9. "Man for All Seasons" (Kaukonen) – 7:40
10. "Heaven on Earth" (Kaukonen, Falzarano) – 3:23
11. "Say No to the Devil" (Rev. Gary Davis) – 4:53
12. "Hypnotation Blues" (Kaukonen, Falzarano) – 10:59
13. "Friend of the Devil" (Jerry Garcia, Robert Hunter, John Dawson) – 6:04

== Personnel ==
- Jorma Kaukonen – electric guitar, acoustic guitar, slide guitar, lap steel guitar, vocals
- Michael Falzarano – rhythm guitar, mandolin, vocals
- Pete Sears – accordion, organ, piano

=== Production ===
- Jorma Kaukonen – producer, arranger
- Michael Falzarano – producer, arranger
- Jon Smith – mixing
