= Barbeque King =

Studio album by Jorma Kaukonen
- Released: January 13, 1981
- Recorded: 1980
- Studio: The Automatt, San Francisco
- Genre: New wave
- Length: 33:32
- Label: RCA
- Producer: David Kahne

Jorma Kaukonen chronology
Jorma (1979)	Barbeque King (1981)	Too Hot to Handle (1985)

Professional ratings
Review scores
Source	Rating
AllMusic	3/5 stars

Barbeque King is an album that Jorma Kaukonen of Hot Tuna and Jefferson Airplane recorded in 1980 with his then-current band Vital Parts. It was the last album Kaukonen recorded for RCA, as the company dropped him from the label due to poor sales.

== Track listing ==
=== Side A ===
1. "Runnin' with the Fast Crowd" (Wilcey, Denny DeGorio) – 2:52
2. "Man for All Seasons" (Jorma Kaukonen, DeGorio) – 3:34
3. "Starting Over Again" (Kaukonen, DeGorio, David Kahne, John Stench) – 3:16
4. "Milkcow Blues Boogie" (Kokomo Arnold) – 3:02
5. "Road and Roads &" (Kaukonen) – 4:23

=== Side B ===
1. "Love Is Strange" (Ethel Smith, Mickey Baker) – 3:32
2. "To Hate Is to Stay Young" (Kaukonen) – 3:02
3. "Rockabilly Shuffle" (Kaukonen) – 2:42
4. "Snout Psalm" (Kaukonen, DeGorio) – 3:12
5. "Barbeque King" (Kaukonen, John Stench) – 3:57

The original acoustic version of "Roads and Roads &" appeared on Jorma Kaukonen's second solo album Jorma.

== Personnel ==
- Jorma Kaukonen – guitars, vocals
- Denny DeGorio – bass
- John Stench – drums

=== Additional personnel ===
- Hilary Stench – bass on "Starting Over Again"
- Mike Butera – saxophone on "Love Is Strange"
- Larry Whitman, Steve Huff – backing vocals on "Runnin' with the Fast Crowd" and "Starting Over Again"

=== Production ===
- David Kahne – producer, engineer
- Wayne Lewis, La'ertes Lee Muldrow – second engineers
- Recorded at The Automatt, San Francisco
- Mastered by John Golden at Kendun Recorders
- Bill Thompson – manager
- Jacky Kaukonen – secretary
- Lora Lovrien – publicity
