= James River Correctional Center =

Prison in Goochland County, Virginia, United States

Coordinates: 37°38′40″N 77°49′40″W

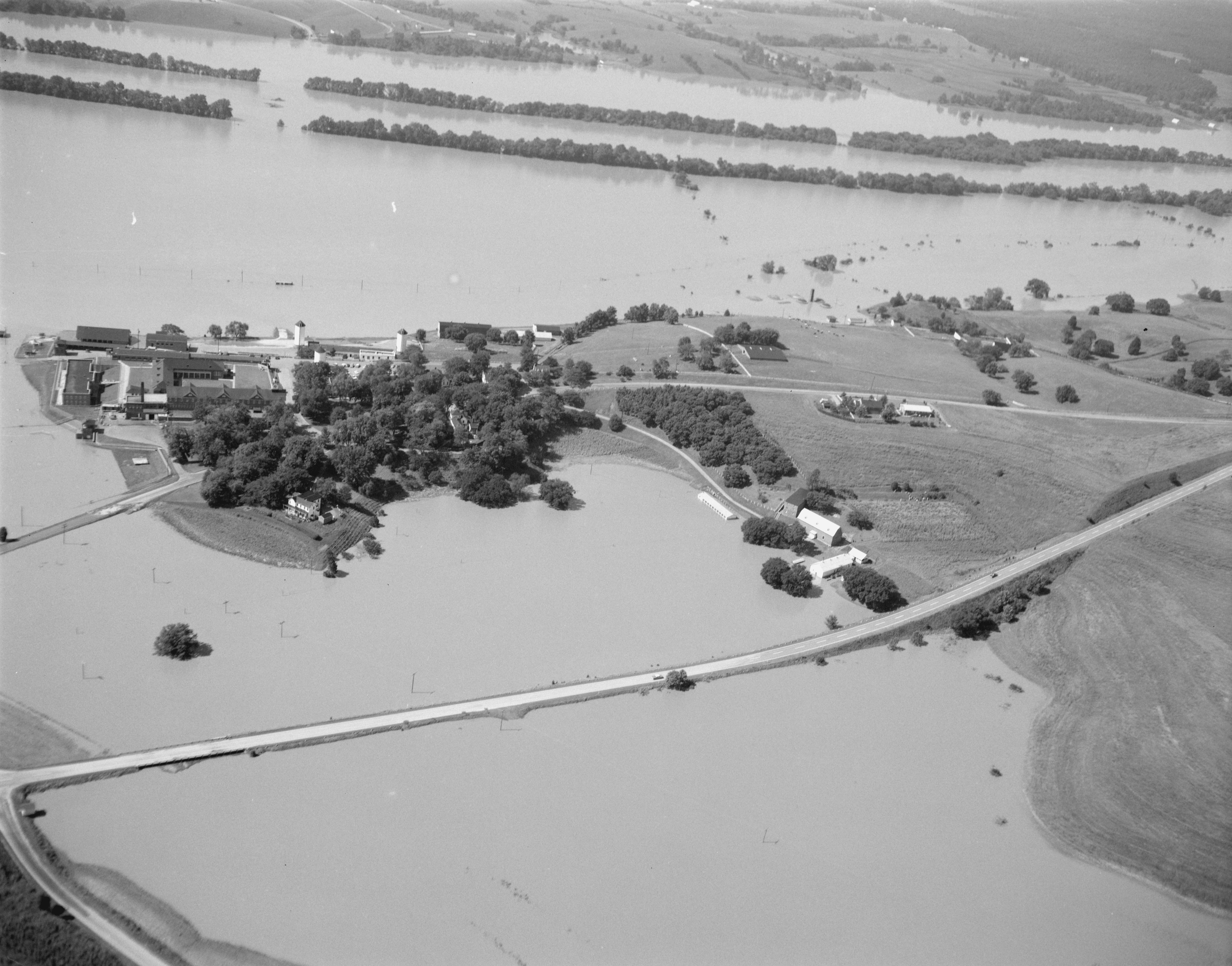
Flooding in the vicinity of the prison in the aftermath of Hurricane Camille, 1969

James River Correctional Center was an American medium-security state-run correctional facility in Goochland County near Crozier, Virginia. Opened in 1896, it was the oldest prison in Virginia. The correctional center housed approximately 450 male prisoners and employed 160 staff. The facility was closed effective April 1, 2011, due to a proposed state budget cut of $10.9 million for the following fiscal year.

== In popular culture ==
Since the closure of the prison, the state-run property has been used for sets for films such as Harriet and Lincoln, and television series such as John Adams and Turn: Washington's Spies.
