= Historic Live Tuna =

Live album by Hot Tuna
- Released: 1985
- Recorded: April 30, 1971 on KSAN, San Mateo, California and July 3rd, 1971 at the Fillmore West, San Francisco
- Genre: Blues rock
- Length: 44:27
- Label: Relix Records
- Producer: Leslie D. Kippel

Hot Tuna chronology
Splashdown (1984)	Historic Live Tuna (1985)	Pair a Dice Found (1990)

Historic Live Tuna is an album by the band Hot Tuna. It was released in 1985. Side A contains previously unreleased tracks from a live acoustic performance played on KSAN radio in 1971. Side B contains previously unreleased material from a live electric performance in 1971 recorded at the Fillmore West auditorium in San Francisco. The album was Hot Tuna's second release on Relix Records, and would be their last release until after the 1989 Jefferson Airplane reunion tour and reunion album, when they were signed to Epic Records for a short time before returning to Relix.

In 1996 the A-side of Historic Live Tuna was expanded and released as the CD Classic Hot Tuna Acoustic, and the B-side was expanded and released as the CD Classic Hot Tuna Electric.

Another song from the Fillmore West concert, "Keep Your Lamps Trimmed and Burning", was included in the album Fillmore: The Last Days.

== Critical reception ==
Professional ratings
Review scores
Source	Rating
Allmusic	2/5 stars

On AllMusic, William Ruhlmann wrote, "Hardcore Tuna fans will be pleased with the existence on record of these performances by a Hot Tuna that featured Kaukonen (acoustic guitar on side one, electric on side two), Jack Casady, Papa John Creach, and Sammy Piazza. Others may find that the rudimentary sound quality and the generally restrained performing level render this inessential."

== Track listing ==
Side A

1. "New Song (for the Morning)" (Jorma Kaukonen) – 5:05
2. "Been So Long" (Kaukonen) – 4:17
3. "Oh Lord, Search My Heart" (Rev. Gary Davis) – 4:39
4. "True Religion" (Traditional) – 7:01
5. "Space Jam" (Jack Casady, Kaukonen) – 0:10

Side B

1. "Intro by Bill Graham" / "Rock Me Baby" (Traditional) – 9:03
2. "Want You to Know" (Bo Carter) – 4:58
3. "Come Back Baby" (Lightning Hopkins) – 9:14

== Personnel ==
Hot Tuna

- Jorma Kaukonen – guitars, vocals
- Jack Casady – bass
- Papa John Creach – violin
- Sammy Piazza – drums

Production

- Leslie D. Kippel – producer
- Ken Pisani – cover art
- Jorma Kaukonen – liner notes
