= Julius Daniels =

American Piedmont blues musician

- Born: November 20, 1901; Denmark, South Carolina, U.S.
- Died: October 18, 1947 (aged 45) Charlotte, North Carolina, U.S.
- Genres: Piedmont blues, country music
- Occupations: Musician, firefighter
- Instruments: Guitar, vocals
- Years active: 1927
- Labels: Victor Records

Julius Daniels (November 20, 1901 – October 18, 1947) was an American Piedmont blues musician. His song "99 Year Blues" appeared on the box set Anthology of American Folk Music and has been covered by Jim Kweskin, Chris Smither, Johnny Winter, Charlie Parr and Hot Tuna on their album Burgers.

Daniels was born in Denmark, South Carolina, United States. He lived in Pineville, North Carolina, from 1912 to 1930, when he moved to Charlotte, North Carolina. He first recorded in 1927, joined first by guitarist Bubba Lee Torrence and later by Wilbert Andrews. He was one of the first black musicians from the Southeastern United States to record. Daniels is buried at the Silver Mount Church Cemetery near Fort Mill, South Carolina.

The Historic Society of Bamberg County held the first Julius Daniels Memorial Blues Festival at the Dane Theater in Denmark, South Carolina, on October 23, 2010. Performers included Drink Small, Beverly Watkins, The Meeting Street Sheiks and Hitman.
