= Bob Carleton =

American songwriter (1894–1956)

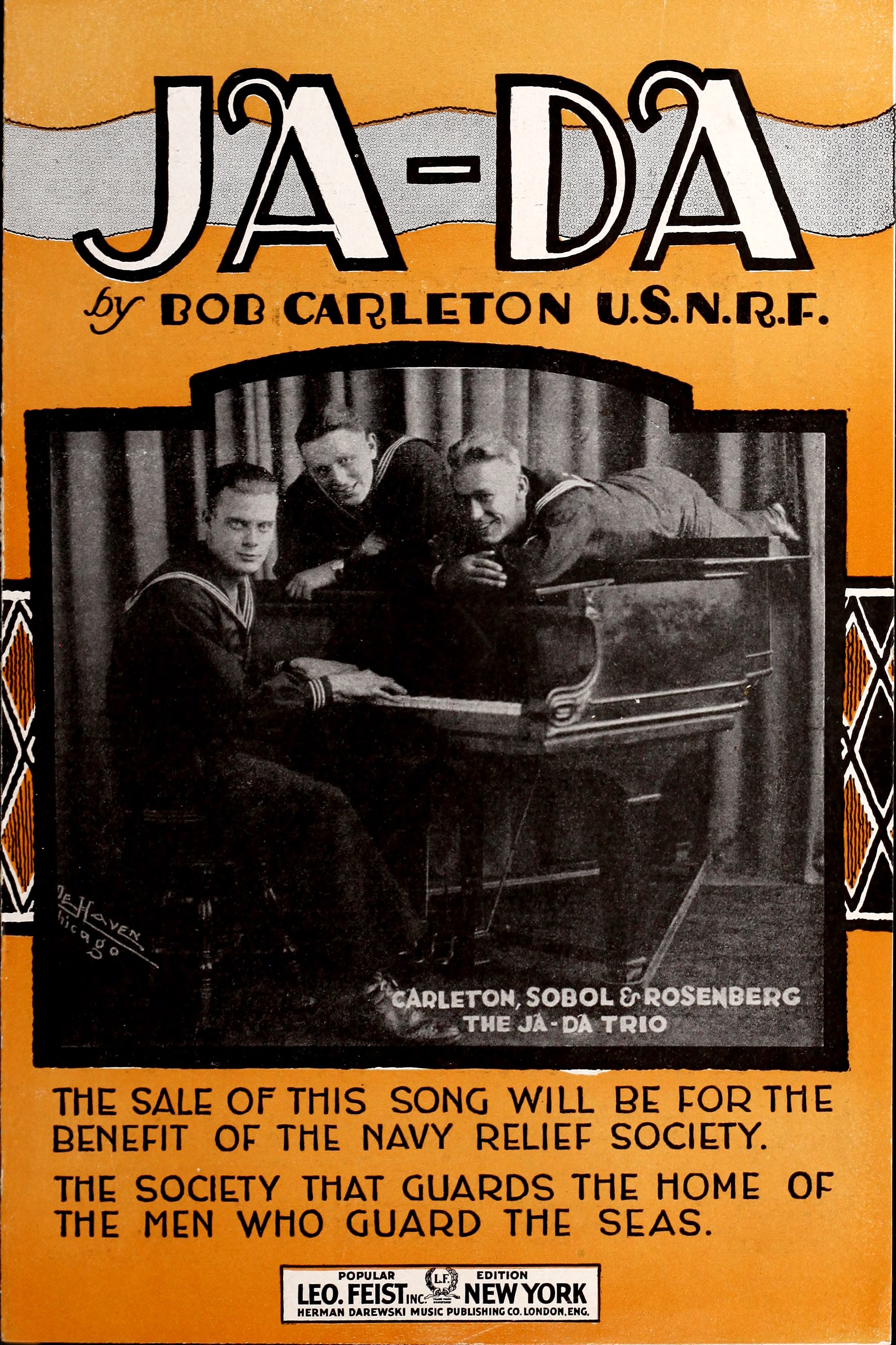
Bob Carleton (left) on the sheet music cover for "Ja-Da" (1918)

Robert Louis Carleton (November 8, 1894, Missouri — July 13, 1956, Burbank, California) was an American pianist and composer of popular music.

He grew up in St Louis, Missouri, the son of a saloon keeper, and was earning a living by age 15 as a theatre musician.

He composed over 500 songs, including the World War I hit, "Ja-Da" in 1918. He made a brief appearance as a pianist in the 1946 film Bringing Up Father.
