= Barry Mitterhoff =

American musician (born 1952)

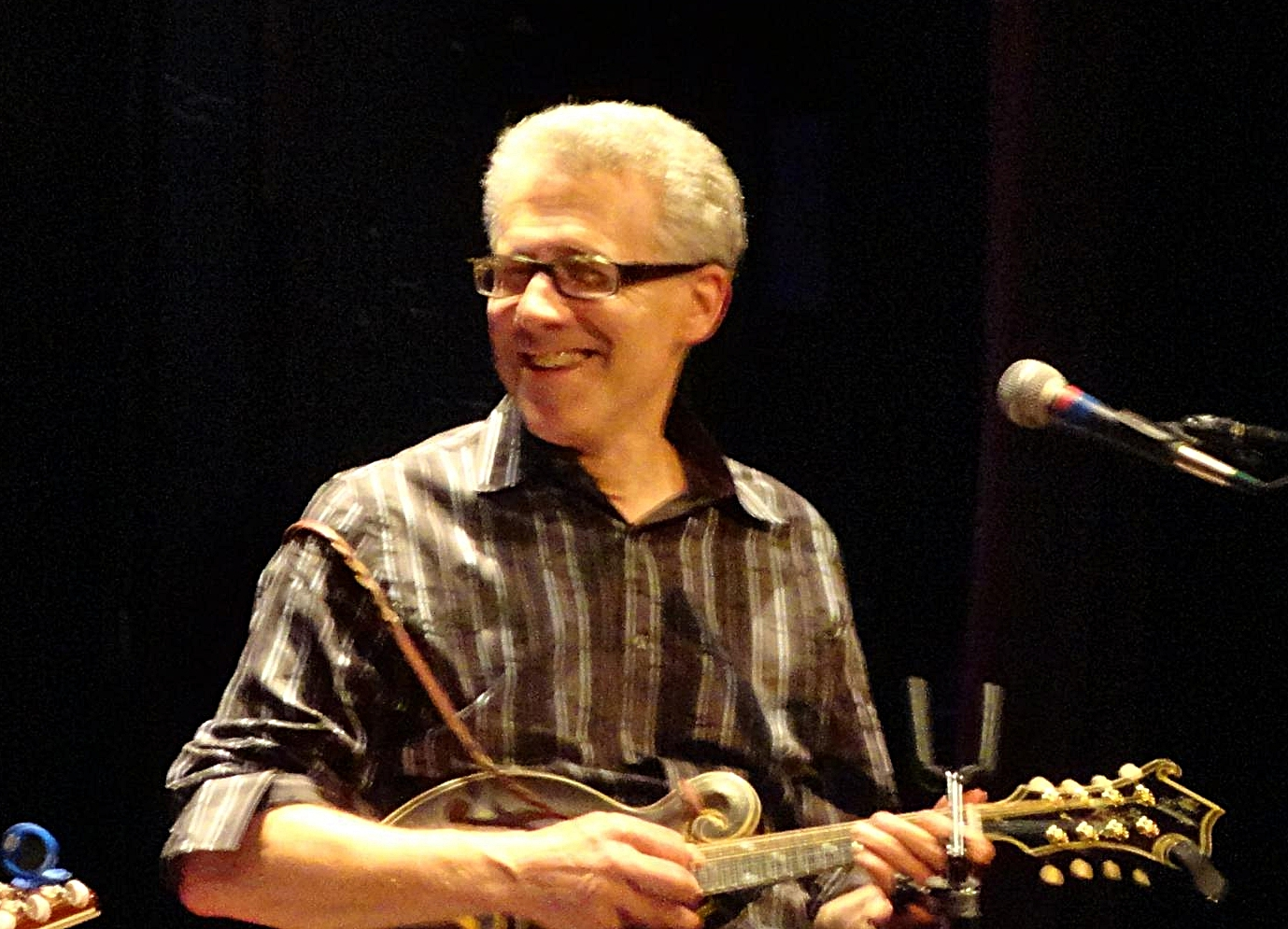
- Mitterhoff playing with Hot Tuna in Boston, Massachusetts, 2012

Background information
- Born: September 16, 1952 (age 74); New Jersey
- Genres: Progressive bluegrass Country; Jam
- Occupations: Musician; Film score producer
- Instrument: Mandolin
- Label: Flying Fish

Barry Mitterhoff (born September 16, 1952) is an American musician who plays mandolin. He is a former member of Skyline, Silk City, Bottle Hill, and Hot Tuna. Played with Peter Rowan, Tex Logan and Lamar Greer in The Green Grass Gringos.

Mitterhoff is also known as a film score producer, contributing to film soundtracks, including You've Got Mail. He worked on the soundtrack for O Brother, Where Art Thou?, but his work was not included in the released version.
