= Michael Falzarano =

American guitarist, singer, and songwriter

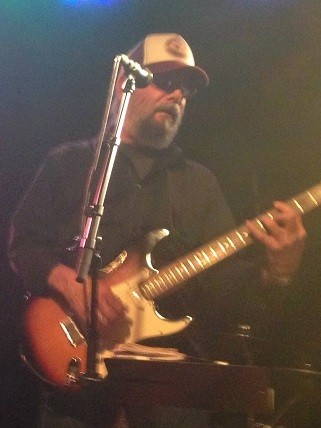
- Michael Falzarano performing with the New Riders of the Purple Sage at Bottom Lounge in Chicago on July 3, 2015

Background information
- Born
- Genre: Roots rock
- Occupations: Singer; songwriter; musician
- Instruments: Guitar; vocals
- Years active: 1970s–present
- Member of: New Riders of the Purple Sage; The Englishtown Project
- Formerly of: Hot Tuna; Memphis Pilgrims
- Website: michaelfalzarano.com

Michael Falzarano is an American guitarist, singer, and songwriter. He has been a professional musician since the 1970s, most notably in Hot Tuna, the New Riders of the Purple Sage, and the Memphis Pilgrims, a Memphis-style rock and roll/blues band that he founded in 1986.

Falzarano released an album entitled We Are All One in 2008 on Woodstock Records and The King James Sessions in 2005 on Blues Planet Records. A re-released version of the song "Last Train Out," which he wrote in memory of the Allman Brothers Band and Gov't Mule bass player Allen Woody, appears on the record. Blues Planet re-released Mecca, an album that Falzarano and the Memphis Pilgrims originally released in 1996 on Relix Records with guests Jorma Kaukonen, Pete Sears, and Harvey Sorgen of Hot Tuna and Danny Louis of Gov't Mule.

When not performing with his own band, Falzarano can be seen with Hot Tuna, the Jorma Kaukonen Trio, and the New Riders of the Purple Sage. Falzarano also produces other artists, and teaches guitar workshops at Jorma Kaukonen's Fur Peace Ranch.

In 2013, Falzarano's original composition "When There's Two There's Trouble" was featured in Alexandre Moors' critically acclaimed film Blue Caprice with Isaiah Washington, Tim Blake Nelson, and Joey Lauren Adams. Falzarano also appears in the movie.

Michael Falzarano's band the Englishtown Project plays covers of songs by the New Riders of the Purple Sage, the Grateful Dead, and the Marshall Tucker Band.

== Discography ==
- Pair a Dice Found – Hot Tuna (1990)
- Live at Sweetwater – Hot Tuna (1992)
- Live at Sweetwater Two – Hot Tuna (1993)
- The Land of Heroes – Jorma Kaukonen (1995)
- Mecca – The Memphis Pilgrims (1996)
- Christmas – Jorma Kaukonen (1996)
- Live in Japan – Hot Tuna (1997)
- Too Many Years – Jorma Kaukonen (1998)
- Rusted Root – Rusted Root (1998)
- Jorma Kaukonen Trio Live – Jorma Kaukonen (1999)
- And Furthurmore... – Hot Tuna (1999)
- The King James Sessions – Michael Falzarano (2006)
- Wanted: Live at Turkey Trot – New Riders of the Purple Sage (2007)
- We Are All One – Michael Falzarano (2008)
- Where I Come From – New Riders of the Purple Sage (2009)
- 17 Pine Avenue – New Riders of the Purple Sage (2012)
- I Got Blues for Ya – Michael Falzarano (2014)
- Family Business – Ronnie Penque (2019)
- A Kaleidoscope Christmas – Michael Falzarano and Extended Family (2020)
