= Embryonic Journey (instrumental) =

1966 instrumental by Jefferson Airplane

Instrumental by Jefferson Airplane

from the album Surrealistic Pillow
- Recorded: November 22, 1966
- Genre: Folk rock
- Length: 1:54
- Label: RCA Victor
- Songwriter(s): Jorma Kaukonen
- Producer(s): Rick Jarrard

"Embryonic Journey" is an instrumental piece composed by Jorma Kaukonen, which originally appeared as the ninth track on Jefferson Airplane's second album Surrealistic Pillow.

Other versions of "Embryonic Journey" were recorded by Kaukonen and featured on an album sharing the song's name. According to that album's liner notes, Kaukonen composed the tune in 1963 as part of a guitar workshop in Santa Clara, and included it on Surrealistic Pillow at the band's behest. According to Kaukonen, the song "evolved from... messing around on a 12 string in drop D".

== Reception ==
Ultimate Classic Rock critic Michael Gallucci rated it Jefferson Airplane's 6th best song, saying that "It's a beautiful performance and a calming tonic to the rest of the album's druggy cacophony."

This song has been used in the films Afternoons of Solitude and Purple Haze, the final Friends episode (titled "The Last One"), in the movie The Rookie, in the movie Berkeley in the Sixties at the end with the credits, and in a UK television commercial for Norwich Union. It was also included on the A Walk on the Moon movie soundtrack and in Ken Burns's documentary series The Vietnam War. Philadelphia disc jockey Ed Sciaky used it as a theme song for his long-running "Sunday Night Alternative" radio show.

== Covers ==
Leo Kottke did a cover version on his 1979 album Balance.
