= Aces and Kings – The Best of Go West =

Greatest hits album by Go West
- Released: 1993
- Label: Chrysalis; EMI USA
- Producer: Gary Stevenson; Peter Wolf; Ron Fair

Go West chronology
Indian Summer (1992)	Aces and Kings – The Best of Go West (1993)	The Best of Go West (1998)

Professional ratings
Review scores
Source	Rating
AllMusic	4/5 stars

Aces and Kings – The Best of Go West is a greatest hits album by English pop duo Go West, released in 1993. It contains most of the band's singles, taken from their studio albums Go West (1985), Dancing on the Couch (1987) and Indian Summer (1992), plus tracks from the remix album Bangs & Crashes (1986) and several tracks that Go West contributed to film soundtracks. Also included are two new songs that were released as singles from the album: a cover of The Miracles' "The Tracks of My Tears", which reached number 16 in the UK Singles Chart, and a remix of Go West's debut hit single, "We Close Our Eyes", which went on to reach number 40.

== Track listing ==
All tracks written by Peter Cox and Richard Drummie, except where noted.

No.	Title	Writer(s)	Origin	Length
1.	"We Close Our Eyes" (Remix)		Previously unreleased version; original from Go West	3:53
2.	"King of Wishful Thinking"	Cox; Drummie; Martin Page	Indian Summer / Pretty Woman soundtrack	4:02
3.	"Tracks of My Tears"	William "Smokey" Robinson Jr.; Warren Moore; Marvin Tarplin	Previously unreleased	3:52
4.	"Call Me"		Go West	4:13
5.	"Faithful"	Cox; Drummie; Page	Indian Summer	4:26
6.	"Don't Look Down – The Sequel"		Dancing on the Couch (American edition); original version from Go West	4:20
7.	"One Way Street"		Previously unreleased version; original from Rocky IV soundtrack	4:36
8.	"What You Won't Do For Love"	Bobby Caldwell; Alfons Kettner	Indian Summer	4:27
9.	"From Baltimore to Paris"		Dancing on the Couch	5:48
10.	"Never Let Them See You Sweat"	Phillip L. Stewart II; Tony Haynes; Thaddis Harrell Jr.	White Men Can't Jump soundtrack	4:20
11.	"Goodbye Girl"		Bangs & Crashes; original version from Go West	4:33
12.	"I Want to Hear It from You"		Dancing on the Couch	3:41
13.	"Tell Me"	Cox; Drummie; Jay Graydon; Jeff Pescetto	Indian Summer	4:17
14.	"True Colours"		Dancing on the Couch	5:12
15.	"The King Is Dead"		Dancing on the Couch	4:27
16.	"Tears Too Late"		B-side of "King of Wishful Thinking" single	4:22
17.	"Healing Hands"		Previously unreleased version	4:47

Note

- US version replaces "True Colours" with "Eye to Eye" (Horizontal Mix) from Bangs & Crashes & "Healing Hands" with "Still in Love" from Indian Summer.

== Charts ==
=== Weekly charts ===
Weekly chart performance for Aces and Kings – The Best of Go West
Chart (1993–94)	Peak position
New Zealand Albums (RMNZ)	9
UK Albums (OCC)	5

=== Year-end charts ===
1993 year-end chart performance for Aces and Kings – The Best of Go West
Chart (1993)	Position
UK Albums (OCC)	66

== Certifications ==
Certifications and sales for Aces and Kings – The Best of Go West
Region	Certification	Certified units/sales
United Kingdom (BPI)	Gold	100,000^{^}
^{^} Shipments figures based on certification alone.
