= Bobby Caldwell discography =

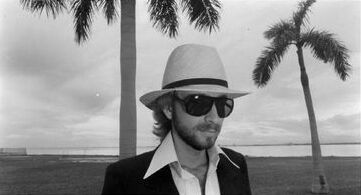
- Studio albums: 16
- Compilation albums: 3
- Singles: 16

American singer, songwriter, and musician, Robert Hunter Caldwell (1951 – 2023), known professionally as Bobby Caldwell, released 16 studio albums, 3 various compilation and archival projects, and 16 singles. His most successful single was "What You Won't Do for Love", which reached No. 9 on the Billboard Hot 100, No. 6 on the R&B singles chart (No. 6), and No. 10 on the adult contemporary chart.

== Albums ==
=== Studio albums ===
Year	Title	Peak chart positions			Certifications
Year	Title	US	US R&B	US Jazz	Certifications
1978	Bobby Caldwell	21	7	―	US: 2× Platinum; Japan: Platinum
1980	Cat in the Hat	113	46	―	US: Gold; Japan: Platinum
1982	Carry On	133	41	―	Japan: Gold
1983	August Moon	―	—	—	Japan: Gold
1989	Heart of Mine	―	―	―	
1991	Stuck on You	―	65	5	
1993	Where Is Love	―	―	13	
1995	Soul Survivor	―	23	5	
1996	Blue Condition	―	―	12	
1999	Come Rain or Shine	―	―	8	
2005	Perfect Island Nights	―	―	2	
2010	The Consummate Caldwell	―	―	―	
2012	House of Cards	―	―	―	
2014	After Dark	―	―	―	
2015	Cool Uncle	―	―	―	
"—" denotes releases that did not chart or were not released in that territory. Sources:

=== Compilation albums ===
Year	Title	Notes
1998	Timeline: The Anthology	No. 8 US Jazz Albums
2001	Time and Again: The Anthology Part 2	
2020	The Time Has Come - Ultimate Anthology	Same songs as Anthology, Pt.1 + Anthology, Pt.2, different order.

=== Singles ===
Year	Single	Peak chart positions					Certifications	Album
Year	Single	US Pop	US R&B	US A/C	US Dance	US Cashbox	Certifications	Album
1976	"The House Is Rockin'"	—	—	—	—	—		Non-album single
1978	"What You Won't Do for Love"	9	6	10	—	10	BPI: Silver; RMNZ: Platinum	Bobby Caldwell
1979	"My Flame"	—	40	—	—	—		Bobby Caldwell
1979	"Can't Say Goodbye"	103	36	—	—	—		Bobby Caldwell
1979	"Down for the Third Time"	—	—	—	—	—		Bobby Caldwell
1980	"Coming Down from Love"	42	28	—	—	94		Cat in the Hat
1981	"Alfie"	—	—	—	—	—		Non-album single
1982	"Jamaica"	105	54	—	—	—		Carry On
1982	"All of My Love"	77	67	—	—	70		Carry On
1984	"Don't Quit"	—	—	—	53	—		Non-album single from Body by Jake soundtrack
1987	"What You Won't Do for Love" (reissue)	—	—	—	—	—		Bobby Caldwell
1988	"Take Me, I'll Follow You"	—	—	—	—	—		Mac and Me soundtrack
1991	"Real Thing"	—	—	41	—	—		Heart of Mine
1991	"Janet"	—	88	—	—	—		Stuck on You
1996	"I Give In"	125	53	—	—	—		Soul Survivor
2015	"Miami Nights"	—	—	—	—	—		Cool Uncle
"—" denotes single did not chart or was not released
