= Bangs & Crashes =

Remix album by Go West
- Released: May 1986
- Genres: Dance-pop, synth-pop
- Length: 66:00
- Label: Chrysalis

Go West chronology
Go West (1985)	Bangs & Crashes (1986)	Dancing on the Couch (1987)

Bangs & Crashes is a remix album by the English pop band Go West. It was released in 1986 by Chrysalis Records. The album mostly contains remixes of songs from their debut studio album, Go West (1985). 'One Way Street' was featured on the soundtrack to Rocky IV.

== Track listing ==
All tracks are written by Peter Cox and Richard Drummie, except "Ball of Confusion", written by Barrett Strong and Norman Whitfield.

No.	Title	Length
1.	"We Close Our Eyes" (The Total Overhang Mix)	6:00
2.	"Man in My Mirror"	4:33
3.	"Goodbye Girl (remix)"	4:33
4.	"S.O.S." (The Perpendicular Mix)	5:08
5.	"Eye to Eye" (The Horizontal Mix)	5:11
6.	"Ball of Confusion" (live)	6:53
7.	"Call Me" (The Indiscriminate Mix)	6:38
8.	"Haunted"	3:15
9.	"Missing Persons" (live)	6:41
10.	"Don't Look Down" (The Stratospheric Mix)	6:05
11.	"One Way Street"	4:37
12.	"Innocence" (The Desperation Mix)	5:52

== Chart performance ==
Chart (1986)	Peak position
Australian Albums Chart	45
UK Albums Chart	8
