= Pretty Woman (soundtrack) =

1990 film soundtrack

Pretty Woman: Original Motion Picture Soundtrack

Soundtrack album by various artists
- Released: March 13, 1990
- Recorded: 1988–1989
- Genres: Pop; rock
- Length: 43:36
- Label: EMI
- Producer: Various

Singles from Pretty Woman
- 1. "Wild Women Do" Released: February 1990; 2. "It Must Have Been Love" Released: March 1990; 3. "King of Wishful Thinking" Released: May 1990

Pretty Woman: Original Motion Picture Soundtrack is the soundtrack album to the 1990 film Pretty Woman, released on March 13, 1990, by EMI. The album contains the song "Oh, Pretty Woman" by Roy Orbison, which inspired its title, "Wild Women Do" by Natalie Cole and Roxette's "It Must Have Been Love", which was originally released in December 1987 and reached number one on the Billboard Hot 100 in June 1990,

The soundtrack has been certified triple platinum by the Recording Industry Association of America (RIAA).

The album does not contain any tracks from the original score composed by James Newton Howard.

== Track listing ==
No.	Title	Writer(s)	Producer(s)	Length
1.	"Wild Women Do" (Natalie Cole)	Greg Prestopino; Sam Lorber; Matthew Wilder	André Fischer	4:06
2.	"Fame '90" (David Bowie)	Bowie; John Lennon; Carlos Alomar	Bowie; Harry Maslin; Jon Gass^{[a]}^{[b]}	3:36
3.	"King of Wishful Thinking" (Go West)	Peter Cox; Richard Drummie; Martin Page	Peter Wolf	4:00
4.	"Tangled" (Jane Wiedlin)	Wiedlin; Scott Cutler	Peter Collins	4:18
5.	"It Must Have Been Love" (Roxette)	Per Gessle	Clarence Öfwerman; Humberto Gatica^{[b]}	4:17
6.	"Life in Detail" (Robert Palmer)	Alan Powell; Palmer	Palmer	4:07
7.	"No Explanation" (Peter Cetera)	David Foster; Linda Thompson-Jenner; Bill LaBounty; Beckie Foster	Foster; Gatica^{[c]}	4:19
8.	"Real Wild Child (Wild One)" (Christopher Otcasek)	Johnny O'Keefe; Johnny Greenan; Dave Owens	Ron Fair	3:39
9.	"Fallen" (Lauren Wood)	Wood	Peter Bunetta; Rick Chudacoff; Gatica^{[b]}	3:59
10.	"Oh, Pretty Woman" (Roy Orbison)	Orbison; William Dees	Fred Foster	2:55
11.	"Show Me Your Soul" (Red Hot Chili Peppers)	Anthony Kiedis; Flea; Chad Smith; John Frusciante	Red Hot Chili Peppers; Norwood Fisher	4:20
Total length:				43:36

=== Notes ===
- ^{^[a]} signifies an additional producer
- ^{^[b]} signifies a remixer
- ^{^[c]} signifies a co-producer

== Charts ==
=== Weekly charts ===
1990–1991 weekly chart performance for Pretty Woman
Chart (1990–1991)	Peak position
Australian Albums (ARIA)	1
Austrian Albums (Ö3 Austria)	1
Canada Top Albums/CDs (RPM)	2
Danish Albums (Hitlisten)	1
Dutch Albums (Album Top 100)	13
European Albums (Music & Media)	1
Finnish Albums (Suomen virallinen lista)	13
French Albums (SNEP)	39
German Albums (Offizielle Top 100)	1
Icelandic Albums (Tónlist)	2
Italian Albums (Musica e dischi)	8
New Zealand Albums (RMNZ)	2
Norwegian Albums (VG-lista)	2
Spanish Albums (AFYVE)	1
Swedish Albums (Sverigetopplistan)	1
Swiss Albums (Schweizer Hitparade)	2
UK Compilation Albums (Gallup)	2
US Billboard 200	4

2005 weekly chart performance for Pretty Woman
Chart (2005)	Peak position
UK Soundtrack Albums (Official Charts)	3

=== Year-end charts ===
1990 year-end chart performance for Pretty Woman
Chart (1990)	Position
Australian Albums (ARIA)	6
Austrian Albums (Ö3 Austria)	6
Canada Top Albums/CDs (RPM)	7
European Albums (Music & Media)	15
German Albums (Offizielle Top 100)	15
New Zealand Albums (RMNZ)	23
Swiss Albums (Schweizer Hitparade)	11
US Billboard 200	18

1991 year-end chart performance for Pretty Woman
Chart (1991)	Position
US Billboard 200	56

== Certifications and sales ==
Certifications and sales for Pretty Woman
Region	Certification	Certified units/sales
Australia (ARIA)	3× Platinum	210,000^{^}
Austria (IFPI Austria)	2× Platinum	100,000^{*}
Canada (Music Canada)	5× Platinum	500,000^{^}
France (SNEP)	Gold	100,000^{*}
Germany (BVMI)	Platinum	500,000^{^}
Ireland (IRMA) Special edition	Gold	7,500^{^}
Japan (RIAJ)	Gold	100,000^{^}
New Zealand (RMNZ)	Gold	7,500^{^}
Spain (Promusicae)	3× Platinum	300,000^{^}
Sweden (GLF)	Gold	50,000^{^}
Switzerland (IFPI Switzerland)	Platinum	50,000^{^}
United Kingdom (BPI)	2× Platinum	600,000^{^}
United States (RIAA)	3× Platinum	3,000,000^{^}
Summaries
Worldwide	—	7,000,000
^{*} Sales figures based on certification alone.^{^} Shipments figures based on certification alone.
