= Futurenow =

futurenow

Studio album by Go West
- Released: 23 June 2008
- Recorded: 2001; 2005–2008
- Genre: Pop rock; R&B; soul
- Label: Blueprint Records
- Producer: Peter Cox; Richard Drummie

Go West chronology
Indian Summer (1992)	futurenow (2008)	3D (2010)

futurenow is the fourth studio album by the band Go West, released in 2008. It was their first studio album in sixteen years, following Indian Summer in 1992.

== Background ==
To celebrate Go West's 20th anniversary in 2005, the duo undertook a UK tour and began working on the songs for what would become futurenow. Some of the new songs were performed on the tour in order to get some feedback from fans. futurenow, which saw the band gravitating to a more guitar-based sound, was released in June 2008. It contained seven new songs and three older tracks, and was recorded at redfish studios and Les Ballons du Chien. The album was met with mixed reviews and some critics questioned the band's decision not to work with a producer.

Two singles were released from futurenow. "Let Love Come" was released as the first single owing to it being a live favourite. It was initially released as a promotional single sent out to radio stations before being given a full single release by Townsend Records. "Only Love" was released as the second single. Two of the album's older tracks are "All Day, All Night" and "Hangin' On for Dear Life". Both were originally released as bonus tracks on the 2001 live album Live at the NEC, with "All Day, All Night" also being released as a single that year.

In a 2010 interview with This is Not Retro, Cox spoke of the album's lack of success and how this led to him taking the role as a singer in Manfred Mann's Earth Band instead of recording further Go West material. He revealed, "For one reason and another Richard and I weren't on the same page about making another album in the middle of last year. After not being very lucky with radio support for futurenow Richard was a little demoralised while I was wanting to be writing songs and recording another album. So it seemed that we weren't going to be making another record any time soon and I then got a call from Jimmy Copley, who was playing drums for Manfred. At the time it seemed that the Go West train had pulled into a station for the time being so I thought I'd try and see if I could make these two things work concurrently."

== Release ==
The album was released as an MP3 download on such sites as Amazon and iTunes. It was also issued as a digipack CD, through Borough Music, manufactured and distributed under exclusive license to Borough Music Limited via Blueprint. On 21 January 2009, a CD version was released in Japan. Blueprint licensed the album to BMG Japan, Phantom Sound & Vision. Including the four-page inlay that was featured with the UK CD version, the Japanese release also featured a -page booklet with liner notes in Japanese and lyrics in English and Japanese. For this edition, two bonus tracks were included; "Only Love (Radio Edit)" and "We Close Our Eyes (Radio Edit)".

== Track listing ==
All tracks composed by Peter Cox and Richard Drummie

1. "Let Love Come" - 3:52
2. "Stars Don't Shine" - 4:19
3. "Man on Fire" - 4:39
4. "Lolita" - 3:51
5. "Glow" - 3:54
6. "Only Love" - 5:31
7. "Never Enough" - 3:53
8. "Faded" - 4:09
9. "All Day, All Night" - 3:52
10. "Hangin' on For Dear Life" - 4:19

== Personnel ==
Go West

- Peter Cox – lead vocals, keyboards (4, 9), guitars (4), programming (9)
- Richard Drummie – keyboards (1, 2, 6), guitars (1–3, 5–7, 9), bass (1, 9), vocals (2–5, 7–9), dobro (6), harmonica (6), acoustic guitar (8), all instruments (10), programming (10)

Additional musicians

- Lyndon Connah – keyboards (1–3, 5–8), vocals (2)
- Dave West – keyboards (1–3, 5, 7–9)
- Deeral Aldridge – guitars (1–3, 5, 7, 8)
- Pino Palladino – bass (2–4, 6, 8)
- Phil Williams – bass (5)
- Vinzenz Benjamin – bass (7)
- Richard Brook – drums (1–8)
- Dave Williamson – trombone (4)
- Julian Jackson – harmonica solo (6)

Production

- Go West – producers, engineers
- Gary Stevenson – engineer, mixing
- Matt Howe – engineer
- Matt Tait – engineer
- Chris Ryan – photography
- Paul Whymant-Morris – design
- Blueprint Management – management
