= Dancing on the Couch =

Studio album by Go West
- Released: 26 May 1987
- Studios: Puk Studios (Denmark); Old School House (Isle of Man)
- Genre: Pop
- Length: 41:21
- Label: Chrysalis
- Producer: Gary Stevenson

Go West chronology
Bangs & Crashes (1986)	Dancing on the Couch (1987)	Indian Summer (1992)

Singles from Dancing on the Couch
- 1. "True Colours" Released: November 1986; 2. "I Want to Hear It from You" Released: April 1987; 3. "The King Is Dead" Released: August 1987; 4. "From Baltimore to Paris" Released: November 1987

Professional ratings
Review scores
Source	Rating
AllMusic	1.5/5 stars
Record Mirror	3/5 stars

Dancing on the Couch is the second studio album by the English pop duo Go West, released on 26 May 1987 by Chrysalis Records. It reached number 19 on the UK Albums Chart.

Go West began recording the album in June 1986. It was originally due to have been released in late 1986, but the release plans, along with an accompanying British tour for November 1986, had to be postponed until 1987 after the Danish studio, Puk Studios, where the album was recorded, suffered a computer fault. Regardless, the band were able to salvage and release the single True Colours in November 1986.

The American version of the album featured a slightly different cover (zoomed in further on the image of band members Peter Cox and Richard Drummie on the couch) and included the track "Don't Look Down – The Sequel" (a slightly enhanced version of a song from Go West's debut album) in place of "Let's Build a Boat". "Don't Look Down – The Sequel" would become Go West's first top 40 hit in the United States.

On 26 January 2024, Chrysalis released a deluxe edition 3-CD, 1-DVD, set of the album, newly remastered by producer Gary Stevenson, with a separate CD including B-sides, Remixes, Rarities, and a third CD with the 1987 Runaway Train Tour: Live at Hammersmith Odeon. A DVD of the concert is also included, which was previously only available on VHS.

== Track listing ==
All tracks are written by Peter Cox and Richard Drummie, with additional writing by Alan Murphy on tracks 3, 7 and 9.

Dancing on the Couch
No.	Title	Length
1.	"I Want to Hear It from You"	3:43
2.	"Little Caesar"	4:28
3.	"Masque of Love"	4:06
4.	"From Baltimore to Paris"	5:47
5.	"True Colours"	3:56
6.	"The King Is Dead"	4:27
7.	"Chinese Whispers"	4:14
8.	"Let's Build a Boat"	3:41
9.	"Crossfire"	4:31
10.	"Dangerous"	3:55

Dancing on the Couch – American Edition
No.	Title	Length
1.	"I Want to Hear It from You"	3:43
2.	"Little Caesar"	4:28
3.	"Masque of Love"	4:06
4.	"From Baltimore to Paris"	5:47
5.	"True Colours"	3:56
6.	"The King Is Dead"	4:27
7.	"Chinese Whispers"	4:14
8.	"Don't Look Down – The Sequel"	4:20
9.	"Crossfire"	4:31
10.	"Dangerous"	3:55

Dancing on the Couch 2024 3CD+DVD set – CD 1: 2024 remaster
No.	Title	Length
1.	"I Want to Hear It from You"	3:41
2.	"Little Caesar"	4:22
3.	"Masque of Love"	4:06
4.	"From Baltimore to Paris"	5:45
5.	"True Colours"	3:55
6.	"The King Is Dead"	4:26
7.	"Chinese Whispers"	4:15
8.	"Let's Build A Boat"	3:42
9.	"Crossfire"	4:22
10.	"Dangerous"	3:55

Dancing on the Couch 2024 3CD+DVD set - CD 2: B-sides, Remixes, Rarities
No.	Title	Length
1.	"I Want to Hear It from You (A Day In Aarhus)"	4:50
2.	"True Colours (The Snake Charmer Mix)"	5:04
3.	"Masque of Love (Schoolhouse Mix)"	4:08
4.	"The King Is Dead (12″ Long Vibe Piano Mix)"	5:35
5.	"I’ll Be Waiting / Tears Too Late"	3:38
6.	"True Colours (Demo Mix)"	3:59
7.	"XL 5"	2:51
8.	"The King Is Dead (Live at Hammersmith 12″ Version)"	6:53
9.	"I’ll Be Waiting (The Skelefocal Mix)"	3:18
10.	"Don’t Be Afraid Of Your Dreams"	3:55
11.	"Don’t Look Down (The Sequel) [U.S. 7″ Mix]"	4:20

Dancing on the Couch 2024 3CD+DVD set - CD 3: The Runaway Train Tour: Live at Hammersmith Odeon
No.	Title	Length
1.	"S.O.S."	4:57
2.	"True Colours"	5:03
3.	"Chinese Whispers"	4:00
4.	"Eye To Eye"	5:01
5.	"Little Caesar"	4:46
6.	"Missing Persons"	6:03
7.	"Man In My Mirror"	4:18
8.	"I Want To Hear It From You"	4:31
9.	"Call Me"	6:03
10.	"Don’t Look Down"	5:06
11.	"The King Is Dead"	4:45
12.	"We Close Our Eyes"	6:03

Dancing on the Couch 2024 3CD+DVD set - DVD: Live at Hammersmith Odeon & Promo Videos
No.	Title	Length
1.	"S.O.S."
2.	"True Colours"
3.	"Chinese Whispers"
4.	"Eye To Eye"
5.	"Little Caesar"
6.	"Missing Persons"
7.	"I Want To Hear It From You"
8.	"Call Me"
9.	"Don’t Look Down"
10.	"The King Is Dead"
11.	"We Close Our Eyes"
12.	"True Colours (Promo Video)"
13.	"I Want To Hear It From You (Promo Video)"
14.	"The King Is Dead (Promo Video)"
15.	"True Colours (Version 2) (Promo Video)"

== Personnel ==
Go West

- Peter Cox – vocals, keyboards, drum programming, percussion, hi-hat
- Richard Drummie – vocals, keyboards, guitars, percussion

Additional musicians

- Dave West – keyboards, Fairlight programming, drum programming
- Peter-John Vettese – acoustic piano
- Alan Murphy – keyboards, guitars, guitar solos, percussion
- Chris Childs – bass
- Graham Edwards – bass
- Pino Palladino – bass
- Tony Beard – drums
- Graham Broad – cymbals, hi-hat
- Randy Brecker – trumpet, flugelhorn
- Kate Bush – backing vocals on "The King Is Dead"
- Mo Birch – backing vocals on "I Want to Hear It from You"

== Production ==
- Gary Stevenson – producer
- John Gallen – recording, mixing (2)
- Julian Mendelsohn – recording, mixing (3–10)
- Brian Malouf – remixing (1)
- George Marino – mastering at Sterling Sound (New York City, New York, USA)
- John Pasche – design
- Kevin Clarke – photography
- Blueprint Management – management

== Chart performance ==
Chart (1987)	Peak position
Australian Albums Chart	95
UK Albums Chart	19
