= True Colours (Go West song) =

Single by Go West

from the album Dancing on the Couch
- B-side: "XL 5"
- Released: 17 November 1986
- Length: 3:56
- Label: Chrysalis
- Songwriters: Peter Cox; Richard Drummie
- Producer: Gary Stevenson

Go West singles chronology
"Don't Look Down – The Sequel" (1985)	"True Colours" (1986)	"I Want to Hear It from You" (1987)

"True Colours" is a song by British band Go West, released by Chrysalis Records on 17 November 1986 as the lead single from their second studio album, Dancing on the Couch (1987). It was written by Peter Cox and Richard Drummie, and produced by Gary Stevenson. "True Colours" reached No. 48 in the UK and No. 22 in Ireland.

== Critical reception ==
Upon its release, Ro Newton of Smash Hits said: "Go West are back and you'd never know they've been away. The sound is exactly the same, the formula is exactly the same. The only thing that's changed is that they sound even more like Robert Palmer." Frank Gillespie of Number One commented: "It's in the best Western tradition with the familiar sounding brassy keyboards and driving vocals but it just might be that they've left people's eyes closed for too long. The back of the record sleeve warns you not to play table tennis before listening, but this is hardly a ball-crusher of a song." Jane Simon of Sounds wrote, "Go West offer inscrutable advice on their sleeve saying: 'Do not play table tennis before listening to this record'. You should of course play table tennis instead of playing this record." In a retrospective review of Dancing on the Couch, Dan LeRoy of AllMusic described the song as "truly dire".

== Track listing ==
7" single

1. "True Colours" - 3:56
2. "XL 5" - 2:51

2x 7" single (UK gatefold release)

1. "True Colours" - 3:56
2. "XL 5" - 2:51
3. "Call Me" - 4:11
4. "The Man in My Mirror" - 4:33

12" single

1. "True Colours (The Snake Charmer Mix)" - 5:04
2. "True Colours" - 3:56
3. "XL 5" - 2:52

== Chart performance ==
Chart (1986)	Peak position
Irish Singles Chart	22
UK Singles Chart	48

== Personnel ==
Go West

- Peter Cox - lead vocals, keyboards, percussion
- Richard Drummie - guitar, keyboards, percussion

Additional personnel

- Alan Murphy - guitar
- Dave West - keyboards
- Tony Beard - drums
- Gary Stevenson - producer
- John Gallen - engineer

Other

- Brian Griffin - photography
- John Pasche - design
- Blueprint Management Ltd. - management
