= What You Won't Do for Love =

What You Won't Do for Love may refer to:

- "What You Won't Do for Love" (song), a song by Bobby Caldwell
- Bobby Caldwell (album), 1978 album by Bobby Caldwell, a.k.a. What You Won't Do for Love
- What You Won't Do for Love (novel), a 2005 novel by Wendy Coakley-Thompson
