= Faithful (Go West song) =

1992 single by Go West

Single by Go West

from the album Indian Summer
- B-side: "I Want You Back"
- Released: 5 October 1992
- Length: 4:24
- Label: Chrysalis
- Songwriters: Peter Cox; Richard Drummie; Martin Page
- Producer: Peter Wolf

Go West singles chronology
"King of Wishful Thinking" (1990)	"Faithful" (1992)	"What You Won't Do for Love" (1993)

Audio
- "Faithful" on YouTube

"Faithful" is a song by English pop duo Go West. It is the opening track on the band's fourth album, Indian Summer (1992), and served as the album's lead single, released in October 1992 by Chrysalis Records. Written by the duo and Martin Page and produced by Peter Wolf, the song reached the top 20 in New Zealand, the United Kingdom, and the United States, where it peaked at numbers 12 and 14 on the Cash Box Top 100 and Billboard Hot 100 charts. Its highest chart position was in Canada, where it peaked at number two in February 1993. It also reached number three on the adult contemporary charts of both Canada and the United States.

== Track listings ==
- UK 7-inch and cassette single; Australasian cassette single
1. "Faithful"
2. "I Want You Back"
- UK CD1
1. "Faithful"
2. "I Want You Back"
3. "We Close Our Eyes"
4. "From Baltimore to Paris"
- UK CD2
1. "Faithful"
2. "I Want You Back"
3. "Don't Look Down - The Sequel"
4. "I Want to Hear It from You"
- US CD and cassette single
1. "Faithful" (album version) – 4:24
2. "I Want You Back" – 4:19
3. "King of Wishful Thinking" – 4:01

== Charts ==
=== Weekly charts ===
Chart (1992–1993)	Peak position
Australia (ARIA)	42
Canada Top Singles (RPM)	2
Canada Adult Contemporary (RPM)	3
Europe (Eurochart Hot 100)	49
Germany (GfK)	51
Italy (Musica e dischi)	23
New Zealand (Recorded Music NZ)	17
UK Singles (Official Charts)	13
UK Airplay (Music Week)	6
US Billboard Hot 100	14
US Adult Contemporary (Billboard)	3
US Top 40/Mainstream (Billboard)	3
US Cash Box Top 100	12

=== Year-end charts ===
Chart (1993)	Position
Canada Top Singles (RPM)	27
Canada Adult Contemporary (RPM)	29
US Billboard Hot 100	89
US Adult Contemporary (Billboard)	24

== Release history ==
Region	Date	Format(s)	Label(s)	Ref.
United Kingdom	5 October 1992	—N/a	Chrysalis	
Australia	16 November 1992	CD; cassette	Chrysalis	
