= Call Me (Go West song) =

Single by Go West

from the album Go West
- B-side: "We Close Our Eyes"; "Man in My Mirror"
- Released: 3 May 1985
- Length: 4:09
- Label: Chrysalis
- Songwriters: Peter Cox; Richard Drummie
- Producer: Gary Stevenson

Go West singles chronology
"We Close Our Eyes" (1985)	"Call Me" (1985)	"Goodbye Girl" (1985)

Promo music video
- "Call Me" on YouTube

"Call Me" is a 1985 song by the English pop duo Go West, which reached no. 12 on the UK singles chart and no. 54 in the US.

== History ==
On 7" vinyl, the album version of the song appeared, along with the B-side "Man in My Mirror", which later appeared on the remix album Bangs & Crashes (1986). The 12" vinyl included the extended mix (labelled "The Indiscriminate Mix") along with either the album version of "Call Me" and "Man in My Mirror" on the second side in Europe, or "We Close Our Eyes (Complete Underhang Mix)" in North America. A German 12" included "The Indiscriminate Mix" on the first side, and the album version and "The Indiscriminate -Kitchen Sink- Mix" on the second side. The "-Kitchen Sink- Mix" is identical to the "Indiscriminate Mix", but equalized differently and lightly reverberated to sound as if the record was playing inside of an actual kitchen sink. This second remix was released as its own 12" single in the United Kingdom, with "Eye to Eye (The Horizontal Mix)" and "Man in My Mirror" on its second side.

== Charts ==
=== Weekly charts ===
Chart (1985)	Peak position
Australia (Kent Music Report)	12
Canada Top Singles (RPM)	91
Ireland (IRMA)	7
New Zealand (Recorded Music NZ)	10
UK Singles (Official Charts)	12
US Billboard Hot 100	54
US Billboard Hot Dance Club Play	25
US Billboard Hot Dance Music/Maxi-Singles Sales	19
US Cash Box Top 100	48

=== Year-end charts ===
Chart (1985)	Position
Australia (Kent Music Report)	89
