= Peter Cox (album) =

Studio album by Peter Cox
- Released: November 1997
- Genre: Pop
- Label: Chrysalis
- Producer: Peter-John Vettese

Peter Cox chronology
Peter Cox (1997)	Desert Blooms (2004)

Professional ratings
Review scores
Source	Rating
AllMusic	2.5/5 stars

Peter Cox is the self-titled debut solo studio album by the English singer-songwriter Peter Cox, lead vocalist of the band Go West. It was released in November 1997 and features 11 tracks mostly written by Cox and album producer Peter-John Vettese. The album reached No. 64 on the UK Albums Chart.

== Singles ==
Two singles were initially released from the album in 1997—"Ain't Gonna Cry Again" (UK No. 37) and "If You Walk Away" (No. 24)—and one further single was released in June 1998, a cover of "What a Fool Believes" (originally by Kenny Loggins and popularized by the Doobie Brothers) (No. 39) which was later added to a re-issue of the album.

== Track listing ==
All tracks composed by Peter Cox and Peter-John Vettese; except where indicated.

1. "Ain't Gonna Cry Again"
2. "If You Walk Away" (Peter Cox, Peter Lord, V. Jeffrey Smith)
3. "Change"
4. "One More Kiss"
5. "I'll Be Good to You" (Peter Cox, David West, Gary Stevenson)
6. "Tender Heart" (Peter Cox, Peter Lord, V. Jeffrey Smith)
7. "Believe"
8. "Wanting You"
9. "The Enemy"
10. "They Whisper to Me"
11. "If You Walk Away" (Cutfather & Joe remix)

=== Re-issues ===
The album was first re-issued in 1998 with the single "What a Fool Believes" (Michael McDonald, Kenny Loggins) added as track 2; the Cutfather & Joe remix of "If You Walk Away" was omitted.

It was re-issued again in 2003 with the same track listing as the 1998 release with the following additional tracks added, including two covers:

12. "In a Better World"
13. "Move On Up" (Curtis Mayfield)
14. "Closer"
15. "Parade"
16. "No Ordinary Day"
17. "Just My Imagination" (Norman Whitfield, Barrett Strong)
