= The King Is Dead (Go West song) =

Single by Go West

from the album Dancing on the Couch
- B-side: "Little Caesar"
- Released: 24 August 1987
- Length: 4:28
- Label: Chrysalis
- Songwriters: Peter Cox; Richard Drummie
- Producer: Gary Stevenson

Go West singles chronology
"I Want to Hear It from You" (1987)	"The King Is Dead" (1987)	"From Baltimore to Paris" (1987)

"The King Is Dead" is a song by the English pop duo Go West, released in 1987 as the third single from their second studio album Dancing on the Couch. It was written by Peter Cox and Richard Drummie, and produced by Gary Stevenson. "The King Is Dead" reached number 67 on the UK singles chart. The 12" version of the single featured a live version of "The King Is Dead" as the A-side, recorded live at the Hammersmith Odeon, London.

== Background ==
The song features Kate Bush on backing vocals. While recording the song in Denmark, Go West felt it would benefit from the addition of backing vocals reminiscent of Bush's style. Guitarist Alan Murphy, who had worked with Bush in the past and was currently working with Go West on the recording of Dancing on the Couch, offered to contact her. Bush agreed to provide vocals, but rather than travel to Denmark due to her fear of flying, she recorded her part in her home studio.

== Critical reception ==
Upon release, John Aizlewood of Number One commented, "Go West have nimbly swapped their simplistic loud songs for a simplistic quiet one. 'The King Is Dead' tries for that late night, smoke-filled bar feel, and ends sounding not a million miles away from the keyboard demonstrator on Sale of the Century. A musical version of the SDP." Andy Strickland of Record Mirror felt the song was superior to the duo's "usual effervescent adult pop" and described it as "some nice jazz/smooch that enables [Cox] to show off his tonsil technique to great effect". He added, "Star of the record is the piano player though, who rumbles and rolls across the last 20 seconds of this record like a Rip Rigger of old." In a retrospective review of Dancing on the Couch, Dan LeRoy of AllMusic noted the song was "incongruous but attractive cocktail jazz with an assist from Kate Bush".

== Track listing ==
7" single

1. "The King Is Dead" — 4:28
2. "Little Caesar" — 4:39 (Recorded live at the Hammersmith Odeon, London)

12" single

1. "The King Is Dead (Live Version)" — 6:53
2. "Don't Look Down (Live Version)" — 4:54
3. "Little Caesar (Live Version)" — 4:29
4. "Call Me (Live Version)" — 3:43

== Personnel ==
Go West

- Peter Cox — lead vocals, keyboards, percussion
- Richard Drummie — guitar, keyboards, percussion

Additional personnel on studio recordings

- Pino Palladino — bass guitar
- Alan Murphy — guitar
- Dave West — keyboards
- Tony Beard — drums
- Gary Stevenson — producer
- John Gallen — recording engineer
- Julian Mendelsohn — mixing engineer

Personnel on live recordings

- Peter Cox — lead vocals
- Richard Drummie — guitar, keyboards
- Alan Murphy — guitar
- Peter Adams — piano, keyboards
- Jaz Lochrie — bass
- Jimmy Copley — drums
- Linda Taylor, Maggie Ryder, Mo Birch, Peter Cox — backing vocals

Other

- Nick Knight — photography
- John Pasche — design
- Blueprint Management Ltd. — management

== Charts ==
Chart (1987)	Peak position
UK Singles Chart	67
