= Indian Summer (Go West album) =

Studio album by Go West
- Released: 2 November 1992
- Genre: Pop
- Length: 56:28
- Label: Chrysalis
- Producer: Ron Fair; Jon Gass; Go West; Peter Wolf

Go West chronology
Dancing on the Couch (1987)	Indian Summer (1992)	Aces and Kings – The Best of Go West (1993)

Alternative cover
- US album cover

Singles from Indian Summer
- 1. "King of Wishful Thinking" Released: 1990; 2. "Faithful" Released: 5 October 1992; 3. "What You Won't Do for Love" Released: December 1992; 4. "Still in Love" Released: March 1993

Professional ratings
Review scores
Source	Rating
AllMusic	link

Indian Summer is the third studio album by English pop duo Go West, released in 1992. It includes the singles "King of Wishful Thinking", "Faithful", "What You Won't Do for Love" and "Still in Love". "King of Wishful Thinking" had been released as a single more than two years earlier, becoming a worldwide hit after being featured in the 1990 film Pretty Woman.

== Track listing ==
All tracks written by Peter Cox and Richard Drummie, except where noted.

No.	Title	Writer(s)	Length
1.	"Faithful"	Cox; Drummie; Martin Page	4:24
2.	"Still in Love"		4:47
3.	"Tell Me"	Cox; Drummie; Jay Graydon; Jeff Pescetto	4:17
4.	"That's What Love Can Do"	Cox; Page	4:27
5.	"What You Won't Do for Love"	Bobby Caldwell; Alfons Kettner	4:23
6.	"King of Wishful Thinking"	Cox; Drummie; Page	4:01
7.	"The Sun and the Moon"		4:53
8.	"Count Me Out"		4:10
9.	"Crystal Ball"	Drummie	4:34
10.	"Forget That Girl"		4:18
11.	"Bluebeat"		4:09
12.	"I Want You Back"		4:19
13.	"A Taste of Things to Come"	Cox; Drummie; Colin Campsie	3:46

== Personnel ==
Go West

- Peter Cox – lead vocals, backing vocals, drums (3), keyboards (6, 10–12), guitars (8, 13), drum programming (11, 12), keyboard solo (11), cymbals (13), hi-hat (13)
- Richard Drummie – backing vocals (1–10, 12, 13), keyboards (1, 2, 6–13), guitars (1, 3, 4, 6, 11, 13), cymbals (2), ukulele (10), drum programming (11)

Additional musicians

- Peter Wolf – keyboards (1–4, 6, 13), drum programming (1–4, 6, 13)
- Randy Kerber – acoustic piano (7–9), acoustic piano solo (8)
- Chuckii Booker – keyboards (11, 12), bass (11, 12), keyboard solo (12)
- David Williams – guitars (1, 2, 4, 6)
- Ron Fair – ukulele (2), keyboards (5, 7–10)
- Benny Bigeri – guitars (4)
- John Goux – guitars (5, 8)
- Paul Jackson Jr. – guitars (7–10)
- Abraham Laboriel – bass (5, 8, 9), ukulele (8)
- Neil Stubenhaus – bass (7)
- "Ready" Freddie Washington – bass (10)
- Jeff Porcaro – cymbals (1), drums (7)
- Vinnie Colaiuta – hi-hat (2)
- Steve Dubin – drum programming (5, 8–10)
- Jon Gass – drum programming (11, 12)
- Rafael Padilla – percussion (2, 4)
- Steve Forman – percussion (5, 7–10), drum programming (7)
- Dan Higgins – saxophones (1, 5, 6, 9, 13)
- Larry Williams – saxophones (1, 6, 8–10, 13)
- Kirk Whalum – saxophone solo (2, 3, 7, 9)
- Bill Reichenbach, Jr. – trombone (5, 9)
- Gary Grant – trumpet (1, 5, 6, 8–10, 13),
- Jerry Hey – trumpet (1, 5, 6, 8–10, 13), trumpet solo (8)
- Lynn Davis – backing vocals (1, 3, 6)
- Siedah Garrett – backing vocals (1, 3)
- Phillip Ingram – backing vocals (1, 3, 6)
- Rick Nelson – backing vocals (1, 3)
- Rose Stone – backing vocals (1, 3)
- Fred White – backing vocals (1, 3)
- Maxine Anderson – backing vocals (2)
- Mona Lisa Young – backing vocals (2)
- Dorian Holley – backing vocals (6)
- Alfie Silas – backing vocals (6)
- Reggie Green – backing vocals (12)
- Donnell Spencer – backing vocals (12)
- Colin Campsie – backing vocals (13)

Music arrangements

- Jerry Hey – horn arrangements (1, 6, 13)
- Ron Fair – additional arrangements (4), arrangements (5), horn arrangements (8–10)
- Larry Williams – horn arrangements (5)
- Richard Drummie – horn arrangements (8–10)

== Production ==
- Ron Fair – executive producer, producer (5, 7–10)
- Peter Wolf – producer (1–4, 6, 13)
- Go West – producers (11, 12)
- Jon Gass – producer (11, 12)
- Donnell Sullivan – assistant producer (12)
- Stylorouge – design
- Nels Israelson – photography
- John Glover for Blueprint Management – management

Technical credits

- Paul Erickson – recording (1–4, 6, 13)
- Tom Lord-Alge – mixing (1–10)
- Michael C. Ross – recording (5, 7–10)
- Jon Gass – mixing (11–13), recording (11, 12)
- Greg Grill – recording assistant (5, 7–10)
- Donnell Sullivan – recording assistant (11, 12), mix assistant (12)

== Charts ==
Chart (1992)	Peak position
Australian Albums (ARIA)	112
UK Albums (OCC)	13
US Billboard 200	154

== Certifications ==
Region	Certification	Certified units/sales
United Kingdom (BPI)	Gold	100,000^{^}
^{^} Shipments figures based on certification alone.
