= In the House of Stone and Light (album) =

Studio album by Martin Page
- Released: (UK); July 26, 1994 (USA)
- Recorded: 1993–1994
- Genre: Pop rock, soft rock
- Length: 50:44
- Label: Mercury
- Producer: Martin Page

Martin Page chronology
In the House of Stone and Light (1994)	In the Temple of the Muse (2008)

Singles from In the House of Stone and Light
- 1. "In the House of Stone and Light" Released: TBA (UK) July 1994 (USA); 2. "Keeper of the Flame" Released: 1995; 3. "Put on Your Red Dress" Released: 1995 (GER)

Professional ratings
Review scores
Source	Rating
AllMusic	4.5/5 stars

In the House of Stone and Light is the debut album by Martin Page, released in 1994. It features the title song, "In the House of Stone and Light", which was a substantial Billboard Hot 100 hit (peaking at number 14) and AC (number 1) hit.

== Background and composition ==
An EPK has been made for the album. It features Martin Page himself, lyricist Bernie Taupin, musician Robbie Robertson, and other friends of Page. In the EPK they talk about his past with his band, Q-Feel, his collaborations with Taupin, and the album and Page himself.

== Track listing ==
All tracks written by Martin Page, except tracks 6 and 9 (Martin Page/Bernie Taupin)

No.	Title	Length
1.	"In the House of Stone and Light"	5:00
2.	"Shape the Invisible"	4:34
3.	"I Was Made For You"	5:13
4.	"Keeper of the Flame"	6:03
5.	"In My Room"	5:33
6.	"Monkey In My Dreams"	6:38
7.	"Put on Your Red Dress"	5:13
8.	"Broken Stairway"	2:49
9.	"Light In Your Heart"	5:05
10.	"The Door"	4:35

== Personnel ==
The following personnel is adapted from the album's liner notes:

- Martin Page – lead vocals, bass, keyboards, guitars, programming, background vocals, acoustic piano
- Jimmy Copley – drums (1–2, 4, 7, 10)
- Paul Joseph Moore – keyboards (1–3, 7)
- Robbie Robertson – guitar (1)
- Neil Taylor – guitar (1–7, 9–10), ebow (2–3)
- Bill Dillon – guitar (1–10), mandolin (1, 4, 10), guitorgan (1–10), rubber bass (6)
- Geoffrey Oryema – background vocals (1, 4)
- Brenda Russell – background vocals (1, 9)
- Phil Collins – drums (2–3, 9)
- Trevor Thornton – tribal sidesticks, handclaps (4); tambourine (4–7); drums (5); Live snare, sidesticks (6); gong tom (6, 10)
- Brian Fairweather, diane poncher, susan poncher – handclaps (4); guitar (5, 10)
- Jack Hues – background vocals (6), keyboards (8); acoustic steel guitar, nylon string guitar (10)

Production

- Arranged & Produced By Martin Page
- Engineered By Jeff Lorenzen, Martin Page & Ed Thacker
- Mixed By Mike Shipley; assisted by Kyle Bess, Bill Cooper, Greg Goldman & Rail Jon Rogut
- Digital Editing By Jeff Lorenzen
- Mastered By Dave Collins
