= Goodbye Girl (Go West song) =

Single by Go West

from the album Go West
- B-side: "Dreamworld"
- Released: 22 July 1985
- Length: 5:08
- Label: Chrysalis
- Songwriter(s): Peter Cox; Richard Drummie
- Producer(s): Gary Stevenson

Go West singles chronology
"Call Me" (1985)	"Goodbye Girl" (1985)	"Eye to Eye" (1985)

"Goodbye Girl" is a song by English pop duo Go West. It was released in 1985 as the third single from their self-titled debut album. The song charted in the UK, Ireland and New Zealand, reaching No. 25 on the UK Singles Chart, No. 19 on the Irish Singles Chart, and No. 33 on the New Zealand chart.
