= I Want to Hear It from You =

Single by Go West

from the album Dancing on the Couch
- B-side: "Crossfire"
- Released: 27 April 1987
- Length: 3:49
- Label: Chrysalis
- Songwriters: Peter Cox; Richard Drummie
- Producer: Gary Stevenson

Go West singles chronology
| "True Colours" (1986) | "I Want to Hear It from You" (1987) | "The King Is Dead" (1987) |

"I Want to Hear It from You" is a song by British band Go West, which was released in 1987 as the second single from their second studio album Dancing on the Couch. It was written by Peter Cox and Richard Drummie, and produced by Gary Stevenson. "I Want to Hear It from You" reached No. 43 in the UK and remained on the charts for four weeks. A music video was filmed to promote the single.

== Critical reception ==
On its release, Ian Cranna of Smash Hits praised the "unexpectedly splendid start" of the track, with its " thumping beat and spangling guitar", but felt the rest of it was "Go West back to business as usual with massed synthesisers and 'soulful' vocal". He concluded that the song was "utterly average". DJ Janice Long, as guest reviewer for Number One commented that Go West "certainly [have] something, even if they do sound little too slick at times". She added, "I'd have thought they'd have come back with a stormer but instead this is just a continuation of what they were doing first time around."

Neil Taylor of New Musical Express described the song as a "staggeringly vacuous cut", a "really weak, synthetic sound thrown on the skeleton of a very flimsy song" and "evidence of the inanity of contemporary pop". In a retrospective review of Dancing on the Couch, Dan LeRoy of AllMusic felt the song was one of a small number that "make any sort of impression" and described it as "R&B-tinged opener, with Cox and guest Mo Birch adding a little heat to Gary Stevenson's synth-heavy production".

== Track listing ==
7-inch single

1. "I Want to Hear It from You" - 3:49
2. "Crossfire" - 4:29

12-inch single

1. "I Want to Hear It from You (A Day in Aarhus)" - 4:50
2. "I Want to Hear It from You (Album Version)" - 3:49
3. "Crossfire" - 4:29

CD single (UK release)

1. "I Want to Hear It from You (A Day in Aarhus)" - 4:50
2. "True Colours (The Snake Charmer Mix)" - 5:01
3. "Crossfire" - 4:29
4. "I Want to Hear It from You" - 3:49
5. "XL5" - 2:51

== Personnel ==
Go West

- Peter Cox - lead vocals, keyboards, percussion
- Richard Drummie - guitar, keyboards, percussion

Additional musicians

- Alan Murphy - guitar
- Dave West - keyboards
- Tony Beard - drums
- Mo Birch - backing vocals

Production

- Gary Stevenson - producer
- John Gallen - recording engineer
- Julian Mendelsohn - mixing engineer

Other

- Nick Knight - photography
- John Pasche - design

== Charts ==
| Chart (1987) | Peak position |
|---|---|
| Australian Singles Chart | 80 |
| Italy Airplay (Music & Media) | 15 |
| New Zealand Singles Chart | 26 |
| UK Singles Chart | 43 |
