= Go West (Go West album) =

Studio album by Go West
- Released: April 1985
- Recorded: 1984–1985
- Studio: Rooster Studios and Sarm West Studios (London, UK); Chipping Norton Recording Studios (Oxfordshire, England)
- Genre: Pop; dance-pop
- Length: 38:21
- Label: Chrysalis
- Producer: Gary Stevenson

Go West chronology
Go West (1985)	Bangs & Crashes (1986)

Singles from Go West
- 1. "We Close Our Eyes" Released: 15 February 1985; 2. "Call Me" Released: 3 May 1985; 3. "Goodbye Girl" Released: 22 July 1985; 4. "Eye to Eye" Released: August 1985; 5. "Don't Look Down" Released: 11 November 1985

Professional ratings
Review scores
Source	Rating
AllMusic	4/5 stars
Record Mirror	4/5 stars

Go West is the debut studio album by the English pop duo Go West, released in April 1985 by Chrysalis Records. The album brought the band into the limelight, scoring them a string of top 40 hits in the UK and New Zealand. "We Close Our Eyes" was the most successful single, reaching No. 4 in New Zealand and No. 5 on the UK Singles Chart. The album itself reached No. 8 on the UK Albums Chart.

A super deluxe edition was released on 6 May 2022 packaged as a 4 CD+DVD box set, newly remastered by original producer Gary Stevenson from the original production tapes. It features the original album, a slightly expanded version of the remix album Bangs & Crashes (1986), demos and rarities (including additional remixes), an unreleased live performance from Hammersmith Odeon on 21 November 1985, a DVD featuring all promo clips for the singles of the album, a never before seen 1985 live performance from Yokohama, Japan and various live television appearances.

== Background ==
Go West, formed in London by Peter Cox and Richard Drummie, had been writing songs for the album since 1982. Two songs featured on the album, "We Close Our Eyes" and "Call Me", helped them land a record deal with Chrysalis Records.

The album features more top 40 UK/New Zealand hits than any other albums and helped them to be voted Best Newcomers at the 1986 Brit Awards.

== Track listing ==
All tracks are written by Peter Cox and Richard Drummie.

Side one
No.	Title	Length
1.	"We Close Our Eyes"	3:50
2.	"Don't Look Down"	3:55
3.	"Call Me"	4:11
4.	"Eye to Eye"	3:34
5.	"Haunted"	3:18

Side two
No.	Title	Length
6.	"S.O.S."	4:01
7.	"Goodbye Girl"	5:08
8.	"Innocence"	4:10
9.	"Missing Persons"	5:25
Total length:		38:21

=== 2022 super deluxe edition ===
CD1 — Go West 2022
No.	Title	Length
1.	"We Close Our Eyes"
2.	"Don't Look Down"
3.	"Call Me"
4.	"Eye to Eye"
5.	"Haunted"
6.	"S.O.S."
7.	"Goodbye Girl"
8.	"Innocence"
9.	"Missing Persons"

CD2 — Bangs & Crashes 2022
No.	Title	Length
1.	"We Close Our Eyes" (The Total Overhang Mix)
2.	"Man in My Mirror"
3.	"Goodbye Girl" (single version)
4.	"S.O.S." (The Perpendicular Mix)
5.	"Eye to Eye" (The Horizontal Mix)
6.	"Ball of Confusion" (live)
7.	"Call Me" (The Indiscriminate Mix)
8.	"Dreamworld"
9.	"Missing Persons" (live)
10.	"Don't Look Down" (The Stratospheric Mix)
11.	"One Way Street" (from Rocky IV: Original Motion Picture Soundtrack)
12.	"Innocence" (The Desperation Mix)
13.	"Eye To Eye" (The Credibility Dub Mix)
14.	"Call Me" (U.S. dance mix)

CD3 — Demos & Rarities
No.	Title	Length
1.	"Special Girl" (demo)
2.	"One Way Street" (demo)
3.	"Don’t Look Down" (demo)
4.	"Missing Persons" (demo)
5.	"Partners in Crime" (demo)
6.	"Man in My Mirror" (demo)
7.	"Goodbye Girl" (early mix)
8.	"Call Me" (secret solo mix)
9.	"Don’t Look Down (The Sequel)" (7" mix)
10.	"Innocence" (The Desperation 7" Edit Mix)
11.	"Eye to Eye" (The System 7" Remix)
12.	"We Close Our Eyes" (The Total Overhang Mix)
13.	"Call Me" (The Longer Indiscriminate Mix)
14.	"Eye to Eye" (The Credibility Mix)

CD4 — Live at Hammersmith Odeon 21/11/1985
No.	Title	Length
1.	"S.O.S."
2.	"Man in My Mirror"
3.	"Eye to Eye"
4.	"Time Heals"
5.	"Hideaway"
6.	"Haunted"
7.	"Missing Persons"
8.	"Ball of Confusion"
9.	"Don't Look Down"
10.	"Innocence"
11.	"We Close Our Eyes"

DVD — Promo Clips
No.	Title	Length
1.	"We Close Our Eyes"
2.	"Call Me"
3.	"Goodbye Girl"
4.	"Don't Look Down"
5.	"Call Me" (Extended)

DVD — Live in Yokohama 1985
No.	Title	Length
1.	"S.O.S."
2.	"Man in My Mirror"
3.	"Eye to Eye"
4.	"Missing Persons"
5.	"Haunted"
6.	"Goodbye Girl"
7.	"Don't Look Down"
8.	"Call Me"
9.	"Innocence"
10.	"We Close Our Eyes"

DVD — Go West at the BBC
No.	Title	Length
1.	"We Close Our Eyes" (Top of the Pops 14/3/85)
2.	"Call Me" (Top of the Pops 25/5/85)
3.	"Goodbye Girl" (Wogan 22/7/85)
4.	"Don’t Look Down" (Top of the Pops 5/12/85)
5.	"Don't Look Down" (Whistle Test 23/4/85)
6.	"Goodbye Girl" (Whistle Test 23/4/85)

== Personnel ==
Go West

- Peter Cox – vocals, keyboards, guitars
- Richard Drummie – vocals, keyboards, bass

Guest musicians

- Dave West – keyboards, linguistaphone, additional arrangements
- Neil Drake – acoustic piano solo on "Missing Persons"
- Alan Murphy – guitars, guitar solos
- Gary Stevenson – guitars
- Pino Palladino – fretless bass
- Graham Broad – drums, percussion
- Timmy Goldsmith – drums
- Mel Collins – saxophone
- Katie Humble – backing vocals

Production

- Gary Stevenson – producer, engineer
- Drostyn John Madden – engineer
- Barry Hammond – engineer
- Keith Finney – engineer
- Mike Drake – assistant engineer
- Neil Drake – assistant engineer
- George Marino – mastering at Sterling Sound (New York City, New York, USA)
- All songs written by Go West
- Published by ATV Music Ltd

Artwork

- Brian Griffin – photography
- Nick Hardcastle – illustrations
- Paul Whymant-Morris – sleeve concept, design
- Go West – sleeve concept, design
- John Pasche – art direction, sleeve concept, design
- Lyrics reproduced courtesy of ATV Music Ltd

== Charts ==
=== Weekly charts ===
Chart (1985)	Peak position
Australian Albums (Kent Music Report)	19
Canadian Albums (RPM)	83
German Albums (Offizielle Top 100)	58
New Zealand Albums (RMNZ)	5
Swedish Albums (Sverigetopplistan)	39
UK Albums (OCC)	8
US Billboard 200	60

=== Year-end charts ===
Chart (1985)	Position
New Zealand Albums (RMNZ)	23
US Billboard 200	92
Chart (1986)	Position
New Zealand Albums (RMNZ)	29

=== Singles ===
Title	UK	New Zealand	US Hot 100
"We Close Our Eyes"	5	4	41
"Call Me"	12	10	54
"Goodbye Girl"	25	33	—
"Eye to Eye"	—	22	73
"Don't Look Down"	13	15	39

== Certifications ==
Region	Certification	Certified units/sales
New Zealand (RMNZ)	Platinum	15,000^{^}
^{^} Shipments figures based on certification alone.
