= August Moon (album) =

Studio album by Bobby Caldwell
- Released: 1983
- Recorded: 1982–1983
- Studios: Morningstar Sound Studio (Hendersonville); Bill Schnee Studio (North Hollywood)
- Genres: R&B; Pop
- Length: 32:32
- Label: Polydor
- Producer: Bobby Caldwell

Bobby Caldwell chronology
Carry On (1982)	August Moon (1983)	Heart of Mine (1989)

Singles from August Moon
- 1. "Sherry" Released: 1983

August Moon is the fourth studio album by American singer-songwriter Bobby Caldwell, released in Japan in 1983 on Polydor Records. In 1991, it was issued in the United States on Sin-Drome Records.

After 1980's Cat in the Hat, Caldwell's label TK Records went bankrupt and he moved to Polydor. However, both Carry On and August Moon suffered from poor promotion and sold poorly outside of Japan, where Caldwell continued to garner a following. This was Caldwell's last album until 1989's Heart of Mine. He moved to Los Angeles in 1984 where he found success as a songwriter.

In 1982, Roberta Flack released "Never Loved Before" on her album I'm the One.

== Track listing ==
All tracks are written by Bobby Caldwell, except where noted.

Side one
No.	Title	Writer(s)	Length
1.	"Sherry"		3:37
2.	"She Loves My Car"	Bill LaBounty; Roy Freeland	3:27
3.	"Fräulein"	Caldwell; Jim Behringer	3:29
4.	"She Does It Better"	Caldwell; Behringer; Henry Marx	3:22
5.	"Cover Girl"		3:22

Side two
No.	Title	Writer(s)	Length
6.	"Loaded Gun"		2:48
7.	"Class of 69"		3:27
8.	"Saying Goodnight"	Caldwell; Behringer	3:44
9.	"Once You Give In"		2:56
10.	"Never Loved Before"	Caldwell; Marx	2:41
Total length:			32:32

== Personnel ==
=== Musicians ===
- Bobby Caldwell – all vocals, acoustic piano (1), keyboards, synthesizers, guitars, bass, drum synthesizers
- Shane Keister – keyboards, synthesizers
- Jim Behringer – guitars
- Jimmy Haslip – bass
- David Hungate – bass
- Jeff Porcaro – drums, drum synthesizers
- Larrie Londin – drums, drum synthesizers
- Jeff Kievit – flugelhorn

=== Production ===
- Bobby Caldwell – producer, engineer, mixing
- Kyle Lehning – producer, engineer, mixing
- Kirt Odle – engineer, mixing
- Bernie Grundman – mastering at A&M Mastering (Hollywood, California)
- Glen Christensen & associates – design, art direction
- Mischa – original lithograph
- Henry Marx – management

== Certifications ==
Certifications for August Moon
Region	Certification	Certified units/sales
Japan (RIAJ)	Gold	100,000^{^}
^{^} Shipments figures based on certification alone.
