= Ain't Gonna Cry Again =

Single by Peter Cox

from the album Peter Cox
- Released: 14 July 1997
- Length: 4:06
- Label: Chrysalis
- Songwriter(s): Peter Cox; Peter-John Vettese
- Producer(s): Peter-John Vettese

Peter Cox singles chronology
"Ain't Gonna Cry Again" (1997)	"If You Walk Away" (1997)

Official audio
- "Ain't Gonna Cry Again" on YouTube

"Ain't Gonna Cry Again" is the debut solo single by English singer-songwriter Peter Cox, released in 1997 from his self-titled debut solo album. The song was written by Cox and Peter-John Vettese, and produced by Vettese. "Ain't Gonna Cry Again" reached number 37 on the UK Singles Chart and remained in the top 100 for two weeks.

== Background ==
In a 2015 interview with Verily Victoria Vocalises, Cox chose "Ain't Gonna Cry Again" as his "favourite song lyrically" out of all the songs he has written or co-written. He noted it was "very satisfying" that people, particularly women, "seem to identify with the theme of the song". Cox added of the song's success as a single, "It was played a lot on the radio and I got some decent support but it didn't transfer into sales."

== Critical reception ==
Upon its release as a single, Andrew Hirst of the Huddersfield Daily Examiner wrote, "The former Go West frontman uses his wonderful soul voice to great effect with a dynamic slice of dramatic soul pop. It's as though he's never been away."

== Track listing ==
CD single (UK and Europe)

1. "Ain't Gonna Cry Again" – 4:06
2. "In a Better World" – 4:44
3. "Move On Up" – 3:44

CD promotional single (UK)

1. "Ain't Gonna Cry Again" – 4:06

Cassette single (UK)

1. "Ain't Gonna Cry Again" – 4:06
2. "In a Better World" – 4:44
3. "Move On Up" – 3:44

== Personnel ==
Production

- Peter-John Vettese – producer (all tracks)
- Chris Lord-Alge – mixing on "Ain't Gonna Cry Again"
- Mark "Tuffty" Evans – mixing on "In a Better World" and "Move On Up"

Other

- Jeremy Plumb – design
- Lorenzo Agius – photography

== Charts ==
Chart (1997)	Peak position
Europe (Eurochart Hot 100 Singles)	89
Scotland (OCC)	32
UK Singles (OCC)	37
