= We Close Our Eyes =

1985 single by Go West

Single by Go West

from the album Go West
- Released: 11 February 1985
- Genre: Pop
- Length: 3:50
- Label: Chrysalis
- Songwriters: Peter Cox; Richard Drummie
- Producer: Gary Stevenson

Go West singles chronology
"We Close Our Eyes" (1985)	"Call Me" (1985)

Music video
- "We Close Our Eyes" on YouTube

"We Close Our Eyes" is a song by the English pop duo Go West, composed by both members Peter Cox and Richard Drummie. Recognisable by its synthesiser hook, it was released as the lead single from the duo's self-titled debut studio album, in February 1985. The song charted worldwide, reaching number five on the UK Singles Chart, number 41 on the US Billboard Hot 100, and the top 10 in Australia, Italy, and New Zealand.

== Critical reception ==
In April 1985, the single was discussed by Molly Meldrum and Queen's lead vocalist Freddie Mercury on the Australian music show Countdown. Mercury was impressed and predicted the band would be "very, very big".

== Chart performance ==
"We Close Our Eyes" spent 14 weeks on the UK Singles Chart, peaking at number five in April 1985. In the United States, the single reached 41 on the Billboard Hot 100 and number five on the Hot Dance Music/Club Play chart.

== Music video ==
"We Close Our Eyes" was promoted by a music video directed by Godley & Creme. This video included Cox and Drummie performing the song in front of stop-motion animated dancing wooden artist mannequins.

== Remixes ==
The "Total Overhang Club Mix" was later included on Go West's 1986 remix compilation Bangs & Crashes. A further remix of the song appeared on Aces and Kings – The Best of Go West in 1993.

== Charts ==
=== Weekly charts ===
Chart (1985)	Peak position
Australia (Kent Music Report)	8
Belgium (Ultratop 50 Flanders)	14
Canada Top Singles (RPM)	95
Europe (European Top 100 Singles)	8
Ireland (IRMA)	11
Italy (Musica e dischi)	6
Netherlands (Dutch Top 40)	22
Netherlands (Single Top 100)	22
New Zealand (Recorded Music NZ)	4
Switzerland (Schweizer Hitparade)	19
UK Singles (Official Charts)	5
US Billboard Hot 100	41
US 12-inch Singles Sales (Billboard)	23
US Dance Club Play (Billboard)	5
US Cash Box Top 100	33
West Germany (GfK)	14

=== Year-end charts ===
Chart (1985)	Rank
Australia (Kent Music Report)	54
New Zealand (RIANZ)	18
UK Singles (OCC)	40
