= Keeper of the Flame (song) =

Single by Martin Page

from the album In the House of Stone and Light
- A-side: "Keeper of the Flame"
- B-side: "Broken Stairway"
- Released: 1995
- Recorded: 1994
- Length: 6:03 (album version); 4:25 (radio edit)
- Label: Mercury
- Songwriter: Martin Page
- Producer: Martin Page

Martin Page singles chronology
"In the House of Stone and Light" (1994)	"Keeper of the Flame" (1995)	"Put on Your Red Dress" (1995)

"Keeper of the Flame" is a song by British musician Martin Page, released in 1995 by Mercury Records, as the second single from his debut solo album, In the House of Stone and Light (1994). The song peaked at No. 79 and 83 and on the US Cash Box Top 100 and Billboard Hot 100 charts, and No. 19 on the Billboard Adult Contemporary chart.

== Music video ==
The music video for "Keeper of the Flame" features Page, a woman, a drummer, and a boy all in separate rooms in a lantern that turns into a four-room house.

== Charts ==
Chart (1995)	Peak position
US Billboard Hot 100	83
US Hot Adult Contemporary Tracks (Billboard)	19
US Cash Box Top 100	79
