= Wild Women Do =

1990 single by Natalie Cole

Single by Natalie Cole

from the album Pretty Woman: Original Motion Picture Soundtrack
- Released: 1990
- Length: 4:06
- Label: EMI USA
- Songwriters: Greg Prestopino; Sam Lorber; Matthew Wilder
- Producer: André Fischer

Natalie Cole singles chronology
"Starting Over Again" (1990)	"Wild Women Do" (1990)	"Unforgettable" (1991)

"Wild Women Do" is a song by American singer-songwriter Natalie Cole. It was written by Greg Prestopino, Sam Lorber, and Matthew Wilder for the 1990 romantic comedy film Pretty Woman and was included on the film's soundtrack as the opening track. The song contains influences from pop, rock, R&B, and soul music, and its lyrics describe an independent woman who lives a wild life. In 1990, the song was also included on certain re-issues of Cole's twelfth studio album, Good to Be Back (1989).

Produced by André Fischer, "Wild Women Do" was released in 1990 by EMI Records, as the second single from the Pretty Woman soundtrack. It became Cole's penultimate top-40 hit in the United States, peaking at numbers 34 and 36 on the US Billboard Hot 100 and Cash Box Top 100 charts. Worldwide, the single charted in several countries, peaking within the top 40 in Australia, Ireland, and New Zealand and the top 20 in the United Kingdom as well as on the Canadian Dance and Adult Contemporary charts.

== Composition ==
"Wild Women Do" contains elements of pop, rock, R&B, and soul music. The track's lyrics describe a strong-willed, independent woman who is not afraid to take risks and lives a life of freedom, which describes Julia Roberts' character Vivian in Pretty Woman. Natalie Cole's vocal performance on the song has been described as "soulful yet aggressive".

== Chart performance ==
On February 24, 1990, "Wild Women Do" made its first appearance on the US Billboard Hot 100 chart at number 84. Seven weeks later, the song rose to its peak of number 34, becoming Cole's penultimate top-40 hit in the United States and her final solo top-40 single. It stayed on the Hot 100 for 10 weeks in total. A remix of the song appeared on the Billboard Dance Club Songs chart, peaking at number eight to become Cole's third top-10 song on the listing. "Wild Women Do" also peaked at number 36 on the US Cash Box Top 100, with 13 weeks inside the chart. In Canada, the track appeared on the RPM Dance and Adult Contemporary charts, peaking at numbers 19 and 24, respectively.

Outside North America, "Wild Women Do" charted in several English-speaking countries. It first appeared on the UK Singles Chart in April 1990, debuting at number 58 and climbing to number 16, its peak, two weeks later. It gave Cole her seventh top-40 hit in the United Kingdom and spent seven weeks in the top 100. In Ireland, the song first charted within the Irish Singles Chart top 30 in May 1990 and peaked at number 29. With its British sales alone, the single peaked at number 42 on the Eurochart Hot 100. On July 29, 1990, "Wild Women Do" debuted at number 42 on New Zealand's RIANZ Singles Chart and rose to number 35 two weeks later, while in Australia, the song debuted at its peak of number 23 in September 1990 and spent three weeks within the ARIA Singles Chart top 50.

== Track listings ==
- US 12-inch single

A1. "Wild Women Do" (Get Wild wit Me remix) – 4:04
A2. "Wild Women Do" (Power mix—with rap) – 4:18
A3. "Wild Women Do" (Power mix—no rap) – 4:36
A4. "Wild Women Do" (single version) – 4:06
B1. "Wild Women Do" (Get Wild wit Me club remix) – 7:11
B2. "Wild Women Do" (Get Wild wit Me dub remix) – 6:56
B3. "Wild Women Do" (Underground Wacko mix) – 6:45

- US cassette single
1. "Wild Women Do"
2. "Wild Women Do" (Get Wild wit Me mix)
- Australian 7-inch and cassette single
1. "Wild Women Do" (single version) – 4:06
2. "Wild Women Do" (Get Wild wit Me) – 4:04
- UK 7-inch and cassette single
1. "Wild Women Do" (Power mix with rap) – 4:18
2. "Wild Women Do" (US single version) – 4:06
- UK 12-inch single

A1. "Wild Women Do" (Power mix with rap—extended version) – 5:55
B1. "Wild Women Do" (Get Wild wit Me dub mix) – 6:56
B2. "Wild Women Do" (US single version) – 4:06

- UK CD single
1. "Wild Women Do" (Power mix with rap) – 4:18
2. "Wild Women Do" (US single mix) – 4:06
3. "Wild Women Do" (Get Wild wit Me mix) – 4:04
4. "Wild Women Do" (Underground Wacko mix) – 6:45
- Japanese mini-CD single
1. "Wild Women Do" (Get Wild wit Me club mix)
2. "Wild Women Do" (Power mix with rap)
3. "Wild Women Do" (Underground Wacko mix)

== Personnel ==
Personnel are lifted from the Pretty Woman: Original Motion Picture Soundtrack liner notes.

- Greg Prestopino – writing
- Sam Lorber – writing
- Matthew Wilder – writing
- André Fischer – production
- Humberto Gatica – mixing

== Charts ==
Chart (1990)	Peak position
Australia (ARIA)	37
Canada Adult Contemporary (RPM)	24
Canada Dance/Urban (RPM)	19
Europe (Eurochart Hot 100)	42
Ireland (IRMA)	29
Luxembourg (Radio Luxembourg)	10
New Zealand (Recorded Music NZ)	35
UK Singles (Official Charts)	16
US Billboard Hot 100	34
US Dance Club Songs (Billboard) Remix	8
US Cash Box Top 100	36

== Release history ==
Region	Date	Format(s)	Label(s)	Ref.
United States	1990	12-inch vinyl; cassette	EMI USA	
United Kingdom	April 2, 1990	7-inch vinyl; 12-inch vinyl; CD; cassette	EMI USA	
Australia	April 9, 1990	7-inch vinyl; 12-inch vinyl; cassette	EMI USA	
Japan	May 9, 1990	Mini-CD	EMI USA	
