= In the House of Stone and Light =

1994 single by Martin Page

Single by Martin Page

from the album In the House of Stone and Light
- B-side: "The Door"
- Released: 1994
- Length: 5:00 (album version); 4:12 (single edit)
- Label: Mercury
- Songwriter: Martin Page
- Producer: Martin Page

Martin Page singles chronology
"In the House of Stone and Light" (1994)	"Keeper of the Flame" (1995)

Music video
- "In the House of Stone and Light" on YouTube

"In the House of Stone and Light" is a song by British musician Martin Page, released in 1994 from his debut album, In the House of Stone and Light (1994). The song peaked at number 14 on the US Billboard Hot 100 chart in 1995 and reached number one on the Billboard Adult Contemporary chart, becoming the most successful adult contemporary song of 1995 in the United States.

The mountain in the intro of the song is Mount Kailas, located near the land of Shambhala. The present Mount Kailash in Tibet is linked with the history of the Ramayana. Page also refers to the Havasupai name of the Grand Canyon, "the house of stone and light", in the lyrics and the title; the Havasupai tribe considers the Grand Canyon to be its tribal land and a sacred place.

== Charts ==
=== Weekly charts ===
Chart (1995)	Peak position
Canada Top Singles (RPM)	8
Canada Adult Contemporary (RPM)	2
Iceland (Íslenski Listinn Topp 40)	31
US Billboard Hot 100	14
US Adult Contemporary (Billboard)	1
US Pop Airplay (Billboard)	9
US Cash Box Top 100	12

=== Year-end charts ===
Chart (1995)	Position
Canada Top Singles (RPM)	51
Canada Adult Contemporary (RPM)	8
US Billboard Hot 100	35
US Adult Contemporary (Billboard)	1
US Cash Box Top 100	38
