= Go West (band) =

English pop duo

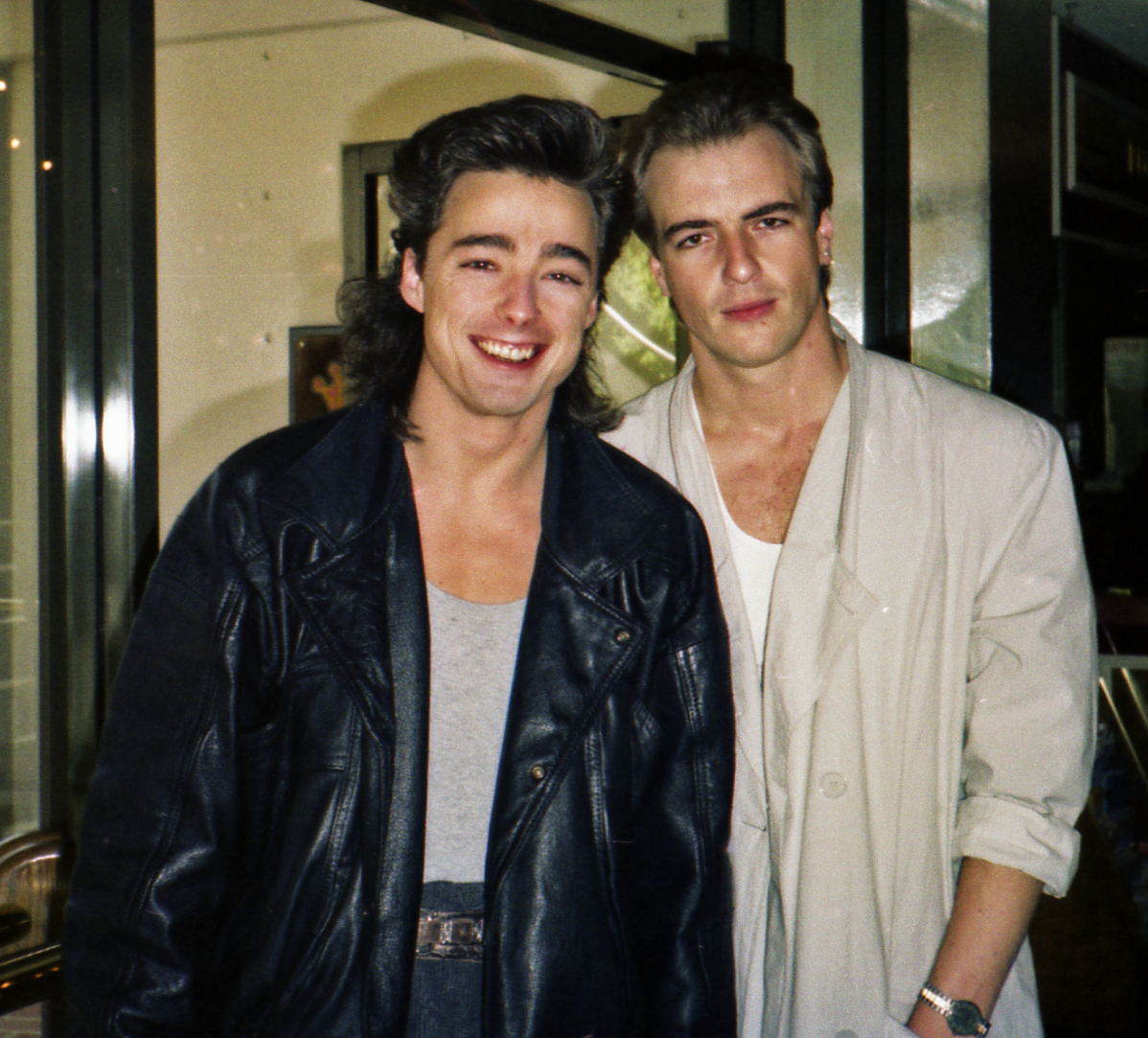
- Go West in 1985, left to right: Richard Drummie (guitar) and Peter Cox (vocals)

Background information
- Origin: London, England
- Genres: Pop rock; blue-eyed soul
- Years active: 1982–present
- Labels: Chrysalis; Blueprint; EMI
- Members: Peter Cox; Richard Drummie
- Website: gowest.org.uk

Go West are an English pop duo formed in 1982 by lead vocalist Peter Cox and rhythm guitarist and backing vocalist Richard Drummie. At the Brit Awards 1986, they received the Brit Award for British Breakthrough Act. The duo enjoyed popularity between the mid-1980s and the early 1990s and are best known for the international top 10 hits "We Close Our Eyes", "Call Me", "Faithful", and "King of Wishful Thinking"; the last was featured in the American romantic comedy film Pretty Woman (1990).

== History ==
In 1982, Cox and Drummie formed the band Go West, with Cox as lead vocalist and Drummie on guitar and backing vocals. The name Go West was chosen due to the duo feeling, at the time, the British public were more attracted to music that came from America than from their own country (in a similar vein to The British Invasion). Go West had a publishing deal and possessed a portastudio, but lacked a band or recording company. Cox and Drummie decided, with support from John Glover, their manager, to find a record producer, and record just two of their songs. The tracks "We Close Our Eyes" and "Call Me" found Go West landing a recording contract with Chrysalis Records.

Go West's debut single, "We Close Our Eyes", was released in February 1985 and reached No. 5 on the UK Singles Chart, No. 5 on the US Dance Club Play chart and No. 41 on the Billboard Hot 100. The video for the song, directed by Godley & Creme, was innovative and unusual for its time, becoming an early favourite on MTV. "We Close Our Eyes" would prove to be the band's highest-placed UK single, and their only appearance in the UK Singles Chart's top ten.

The duo's eponymous debut studio album was released in April 1985. It included "We Close Our Eyes" and "Call Me" as well as "Don't Look Down", which served as the prequel to what would be their first top 40 hit in the US. The album peaked at no. 8 in the United Kingdom. Bangs & Crashes, an album of remixes, B-sides and live tracks, was released in 1986, and included the track "One Way Street" which was part of the 1985 Rocky IV film soundtrack. Go West were voted "Best Newcomer" at the 1986 Brit Awards.

In 1987, Go West released the proper follow-up to their debut studio album, Dancing on the Couch, which made the UK top 20. Although several singles were released, the album was not as commercially successful as their first, particularly in the United States. However, it yielded the band's first American top 40 hit single: "Don't Look Down – The Sequel".

In 1990, Go West had a no. 8 hit in the US with "King of Wishful Thinking" from the film Pretty Woman. Written by Cox and Drummie in collaboration with Martin Page, the song received an ASCAP award.

Go West, 2008

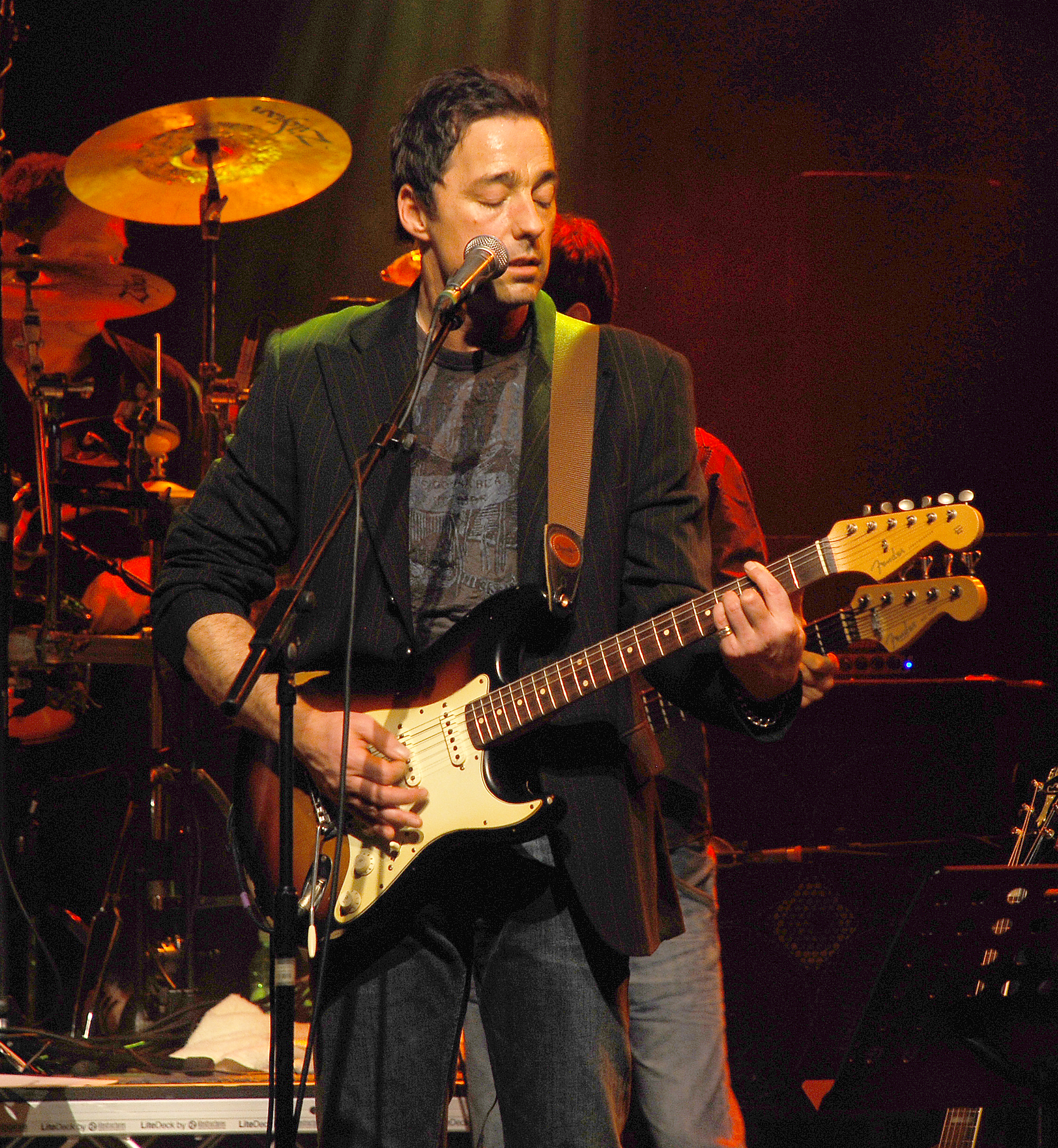
Richard Drummie

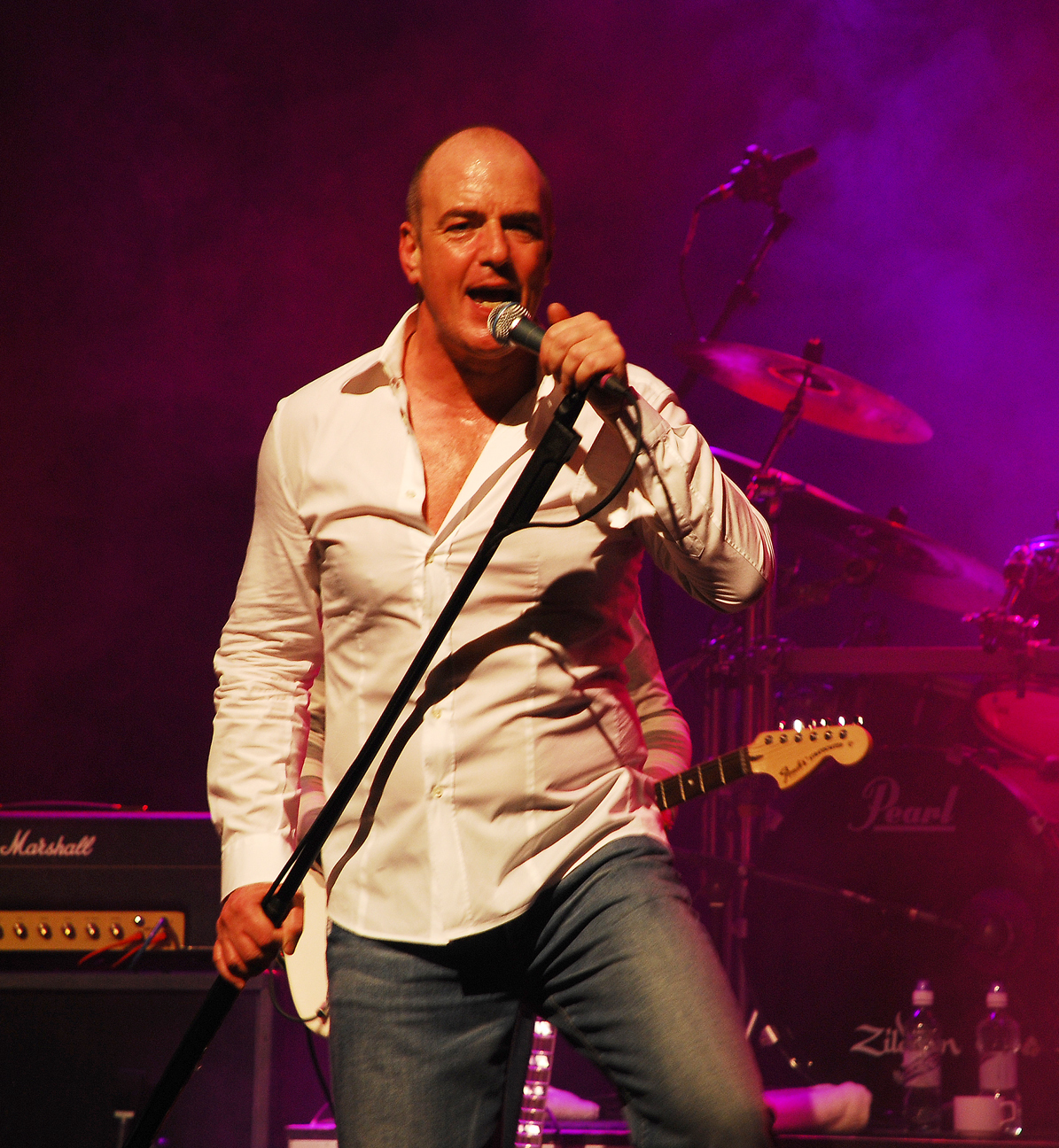
Peter Cox

In 1992, the duo released their third studio album Indian Summer, which included "Faithful" and revival of Bobby Caldwell's original "What You Won't Do for Love". Written by the band and Martin Page and produced by Peter Wolf, the song reached the top 20 in the UK, Canada and the United States.

Cox and Drummie appeared on Jim'll Fix It: Strikes Again in 2007, to re-create a popular 'fix-it' from 1986; in the original show, a fifteen-year-old girl had sung "We Close Our Eyes" with Go West as a backing vocalist.

In November 2015, a compilation album called 80's Re:Covered featured two Go West covers of the Killers' "Human", including a remix, while a recording of a 2003 concert recorded at the Robin 2 in Bilston was released as Live Robin 2 – 2003 CD/DVD in 2016. The concert was previously released as the live DVD Kings of Wishful Thinking – Live in 2004.

In February 2026, Go West and Debbie Gibson announced an upcoming joint tour of Australia.

== Awards and nominations ==
Year	Awards	Category	Work	Result	Ref.
1986	Pollstar Concert Industry Awards	Next Major Arena Headliner	Themselves	Nominated	
1991	Brit Awards	British Video of the Year	"King of Wishful Thinking"	Nominated	
1992	ASCAP Pop Music Awards	Most Performed Song	"King of Wishful Thinking"	Won	
1993	Hit Awards (Hong Kong)	Top Duo/Group	Themselves	Nominated	
1994	ASCAP Pop Music Awards	Most Performed Song	"Faithful"	Won	

== Members ==
- Peter Cox – lead vocals, keyboards, percussion, guitars
- Richard Drummie – electric guitars, keyboards, backing vocals, bass

== Discography ==
=== Studio albums ===
Title	Details	Peak chart positions					Certifications
Title	Details	UK	AUS	NZ	SWE	US	Certifications
Go West	Released: 1985; Label: Chrysalis	8	19	5	39	60	BPI: 2× Platinum
Dancing on the Couch	Released: 1987; Label: Chrysalis	19	95	31	49	172	
Indian Summer	Released: 1992; Label: Chrysalis	13	112	—	—	154	BPI: Gold
Futurenow	Released: 2008; Label: Blueprint	—	—	—	—	—	
3D	Released: 2013; Label: Blueprint	—	—	—	—	—	
"—" denotes releases that did not chart or were not released in that territory.

=== Live albums ===
- The Best of Go West: Live at the NEC (2001)
- Tony Hadley v Peter Cox & Go West (with Tony Hadley) (2004)
- Live Robin 2 – 2003 (2016)

=== Compilation albums ===
- Aces and Kings – The Best of Go West (1993) (BPI: Gold)
- The Best of Go West (1998)
- The Best Of (1998)
- The Very Best of Go West (2012)

=== Remix albums ===
Title	Details	Peak chart positions	
Title	Details	AUS	NZ
Bangs & Crashes	Released: 1986; Label: Chrysalis	45	14
More Bangs & Crashes	Released: 1986; Label: Chrysalis	—	—
"—" denotes releases that did not chart.

=== Extended plays ===
- 3D Part 1 (2010)
- 3D Part 2 (2011)
- 3D Part 3 (2013)

=== Singles ===
Title	Year	Peak chart positions										Certifications	Album
Title	Year	UK	AUS	BEL (FL)	GER	IRE	NLD	NZ	SWE	SWI	US	Certifications	Album
"We Close Our Eyes"	1985	5	8	14	14	11	22	4	—	19	41	BPI: Silver	Go West
"Call Me"	1985	12	12	—	—	7	—	10	—	—	54		Go West
"Goodbye Girl"	1985	25	55	—	—	19	—	33	—	—	—		Go West
"Eye to Eye"	1985	—	—	—	—	—	—	—	—	—	73		Go West
"Don't Look Down - The Sequel"	1985	13	26	—	—	10	—	15	—	—	—		Go West
"One Way Street"	1986	—	—	—	—	—	—	—	—	—	—		Bangs & Crashes
"True Colours"	1986	48	—	—	—	22	—	—	—	—	—		Dancing on the Couch
"I Want to Hear It from You"	1987	43	80	—	—	—	—	26	—	—	—		Dancing on the Couch
"Don't Look Down – The Sequel"	1987	—	—	—	—	—	—	—	—	—	39		Dancing on the Couch
"The King Is Dead"	1987	67	—	—	—	—	—	—	—	—	—		Dancing on the Couch
"From Baltimore to Paris"	1987	—	—	—	—	—	—	—	—	—	—		Dancing on the Couch
"King of Wishful Thinking"	1990	18	6	—	46	23	—	24	20	—	8	BPI: Gold; ARIA: Gold	Pretty Woman: Original Motion Picture Soundtrack and Indian Summer
"Faithful"	1992	13	42	—	51	—	—	—	—	—	14		Indian Summer
"What You Won't Do for Love"	1993	15	122	52	—	—	—	—	—	—	55		Indian Summer
"Still in Love"	1993	43	—	—	—	—	—	—	—	—	—		Indian Summer
"Tracks of My Tears"	1993	16	151	—	—	—	—	—	—	—	—		Aces and Kings – The Best of Go West
"We Close Our Eyes" (remix)	1993	40	—	—	—	—	—	—	—	—	—		Aces and Kings – The Best of Go West
"All Day All Night"	2001	—	—	—	—	—	—	—	—	—	—		Live at the NEC
"Let Love Come"	2008	—	—	—	—	—	—	—	—	—	—		futurenow
"Only Love"	2008	—	—	—	—	—	—	—	—	—	—		futurenow
"Determination"	2016	—	—	—	—	—	—	—	—	—	—		Fly (Songs Inspired by the Film Eddie the Eagle)
"—" denotes a recording that did not chart or was not released in that territory.
