= Q-Feel =

British synthpop group

- Origin: England
- Genres: New wave; synthpop; hi-NRG
- Years active: 1981–1984
- Label: Jive
- Past members: Martin Page; Brian Fairweather; Trevor Thornton; Chris Richardson

Q-Feel was a British synthpop group. They released their self-titled album in 1982, which included the single, "Dancing in Heaven (Orbital Be-Bop)". It was an entry in the 1982 A Song for Europe, the UK's pre-selection for the Eurovision Song Contest. It finished sixth (out of eight) behind eventual winners Bardo.

== Popular culture ==
The song "Dancing in Heaven (Orbital Be-Bop)" was featured in the 1985 dance film, Girls Just Want to Have Fun, and the opening sequence of the 2007 retro comedy, Kickin' It Old Skool. Due to its presence in Girls Just Want to Have Fun, the song gained significant exposure in Los Angeles, where Top 40 radio station 102.7 KIIS-FM championed the record, making it one of their most-played songs at the time of the film's release.

== After break-up ==
Group frontman Martin Page went on to achieve success as a songwriter and (eventual) solo artist, co-writing several hit songs of the 1980s, including the number one hits "We Built This City" (Starship) and "These Dreams" (Heart), and collaborating with artists as diverse as Earth, Wind & Fire, Kim Carnes, Lee Ritenour, and Neil Diamond. He has frequently collaborated with fellow Q-Feel alumnus Brian Fairweather on songwriting and performing with other musicians.

Following Q-Feel's dissolution, the band's keyboardist Chris Richardson embarked on a lengthy career directing church choirs in London, deliberately avoiding the spotlight and refusing offers to stay involved in the contemporary music scene. Richardson died in 2019.

== Personnel ==
- Martin Page – bass, vocals
- Brian Fairweather – guitar, vocals
- Trevor Thornton – drums
- Chris Richardson – keyboards, background vocals

=== Studio personnel ===
- Nigel Green - recording engineer
- Mike Shipley - recording engineer
- Peter Harris - drum programming
- Matt Wallis - assistant engineer
- John Kongos - Fairlight CMI synthesizer programming

== Discography ==
=== Albums ===
- Q-Feel (1982), Jive

=== Singles ===
- "Doctor on the Radio" (1981)
- "Dancing in Heaven (Orbital Be-Bop)" (1982)
- "Crosstalk" (1982) (promo only)
- "Heroes Never Die" (1984)
- "Dancing in Heaven (Orbital Be-Bop)" (1989) (reissue)

== Charts ==
=== Singles ===
Year	Single	Chart	Position
1982	"Dancing in Heaven (Orbital Be-Bop)"	US Club Play Singles	18
1982	"Dancing in Heaven (Orbital Be-Bop)"	U.S. Bubbling Under Hot 100	10
1989	"Dancing in Heaven (Orbital Be-Bop)"	U.S. Hot Dance Music/Maxi-Singles Sales	44
1989	"Dancing in Heaven (Orbital Be-Bop)"	U.S. Billboard Hot 100	75
