= Eye to Eye (Go West song) =

Single by Go West

from the album Go West
- B-side: "Man in My Mirror"
- Released: August 1985
- Length: 3:32
- Label: Chrysalis
- Songwriters: Peter Cox; Richard Drummie
- Producer: Gary Stevenson

Go West singles chronology
"Goodbye Girl" (1985)	"Eye to Eye" (1985)	"Don't Look Down – The Sequel" (1985)

"Eye to Eye" is a song by the English pop duo Go West, which was released in 1985 as the fourth single from their debut studio album Go West. It was written by Peter Cox and Richard Drummie, and produced by Gary Stevenson. "Eye to Eye" reached No. 73 on the US Billboard Hot 100 and No. 32 on the Billboard Hot Dance Club Songs chart.

For its release as a single, the song was given a remix by the American synth-pop duo the System. To promote the song, the band performed it on Soul Train in October 1985.

== Critical reception ==
Upon release, Cash Box listed the song as one of their feature picks during August 1985 and commented: "With moderate success from its first two singles, this versatile and astute British group's latest release is an R&B tinged song which shows soul and heart. A nice crossover effort." In a review of the 12" single, Cash Box said: "Go West's most R&B flavored cut is here remixed by the System and the result is a Hall & Oates-ish version guaranteed to be a strong urban player." Billboard recommended the song and described the song as "blue-eyed synth-soul" and "Doobie-ish".

In a review of the Go West studio album, People said: "...still, the LP's best cuts, "Goodbye Girl" and "Eye to Eye", are little more than blatant soul knockoffs. But hey, if it comes out this tasty, why not go ahead?" In the Digital Audio's Guide to Compact Discs, a review of the album noted: "The singles "We Close Our Eyes" and "Call Me" attack you with greater clarity and more drive than you'll hear on the radio. The same holds true with the remaining seven cuts, most notably "Haunted" and "Eye to Eye.""

== Track listing ==
7" single (US release)

1. "Eye to Eye" – 3:32
2. "Man in My Mirror" – 4:28

7" single (Japanese release)

1. "Eye to Eye" – 3:32
2. "Dreamworld" – 4:13

7" single (New Zealand release)

1. "Eye to Eye" – 3:32
2. "Haunted" – 3:18

12" single

1. "Eye to Eye (Credibility Mix)" – 5:45
2. "Eye to Eye (Horizontal Mix)" – 5:05
3. "Eye to Eye (Credibility Dub Mix)" – 4:50

== Personnel ==
Go West

- Peter Cox – lead vocals, guitar, keyboards
- Richard Drummie – keyboards, bass

Production and artwork

- Gary Stevenson – producer
- The System – remixing, additional production on "Eye to Eye", "Credibility Mix" and "Credibility Dub Mix"
- Go West, Julian Mendelsohn, Ron Fair – remixing on "Horizontal Mix"
- Aaron Rapaport – photography
- Ria Lewerke – art direction, design

== Charts ==
Chart (1985)	Peak position
US Billboard Hot 100	73
US Billboard Hot Dance Club Songs	32
US Billboard R&B Singles	67
