= Carry On (Bobby Caldwell album) =

Studio album by Bobby Caldwell
- Released: March 26, 1982
- Recorded: 1981–1982
- Studios: Davlen Sound Studios (Los Angeles); Quadradial Recording Studios (Miami); Kendun Recorders (Burbank)
- Genres: R&B; Soul
- Length: 33:00
- Label: Polydor
- Producer: Bobby Caldwell

Bobby Caldwell chronology
Cat in the Hat (1980)	Carry On (1982)	August Moon (1983)

Singles from Carry On
- 1. "Jamaica" Released: March 9, 1982; 2. "All of My Love" Released: August 1982

Carry On is the third studio album by American singer-songwriter Bobby Caldwell, released on March 26, 1982. It was Caldwell's first album on Polydor Records.

Professional ratings
Review scores
Source	Rating
AllMusic	3/5 stars
Cash Box	8.98/10.00 stars

== Track listing ==
All tracks are written by Bobby Caldwell, with additional writers noted.

Side one
No.	Title	Writer(s)	Length
1.	"All of My Love"		3:29
2.	"Sunny Hills"		4:26
3.	"Loving You"	Henry Marx	3:40
4.	"Words"		4:30

Side two
No.	Title	Writer(s)	Length
5.	"Catwalk"	George "Chocolate" Perry	4:45
6.	"Jamaica"		5:02
7.	"You Belong to Me"		3:12
8.	"Carry On"		3:56
Total length:			33:00

== Personnel ==
=== Musicians ===
- Bobby Caldwell – all vocals, keyboards, synthesizers, acoustic piano (6), guitars, bass, vibraphone, marimba
- Steve Porcaro – keyboards, synthesizers
- David Paich – Moog bass
- Steve Lukather – guitars
- David Williams – guitars
- George "Chocolate" Perry – bass
- Neil Stubenhaus – bass
- Jimmy Haslip – bass
- Jeff Porcaro – drums
- Joe Galdo – drums
- Michael Fisher – percussion
- Tower of Power horns
  - Marc Russo – alto saxophone
  - Stephen "Doc" Kupka – baritone saxophone
  - Emilio Castillo – tenor saxophone
  - Mic Gillette – trombone, trumpet, flugelhorn
  - Greg Adams – trumpet, flugelhorn

Music arrangements

- James Newton Howard – string arrangements (1, 6)
- David Paich – string arrangements (1, 6)
- Bobby Caldwell – string arrangements (2), horn arrangements (3)
- Jerry Hey – string arrangements (2), horn arrangements (3)
- Greg Adams – horn arrangements (3)

=== Production ===
- Bobby Caldwell – producer
- Jeff Borgeson – engineer
- Bobby Ingria – engineer
- Ernie Sheesley – engineer
- Bill Thomas – engineer
- Danny Cislo – assistant engineer
- Jerry Ichava – assistant engineer
- Sandra Wilson – assistant engineer
- Kyle Lehning – mixing
- Bernie Grundman – mastering at A&M Mastering (Hollywood, California)
- Tim Alt – design, illustration
- Henry Marx – management

== Charts ==
=== Year-end charts ===
Chart (1982)	Position
US Billboard 200	133
US Top R&B/Hip-Hop Albums (Billboard)	41

=== Singles ===
Year	Single	Chart positions	
Year	Single	US	US R&B
1982	"Jamaica"	105	54
1982	"All of My Love"	77	67

== Certifications ==
Certifications for Carry On
Region	Certification	Certified units/sales
Japan (RIAJ)	Gold	100,000^{^}
^{^} Shipments figures based on certification alone.
