= King of Wishful Thinking =

1990 single by Go West

Single by Go West

from the album Indian Summer and Pretty Woman: Original Motion Picture Soundtrack
- B-side: "Tears Too Late"
- Released: 1990
- Genre: Pop; adult contemporary
- Length: 4:00
- Label: Chrysalis; EMI
- Songwriters: Peter Cox; Richard Drummie; Martin Page
- Producer: Peter Wolf

Go West singles chronology
"Let's Build a Boat" (1987)	"King of Wishful Thinking" (1990)	"Faithful" (1992)

"King of Wishful Thinking" is a song by British pop duo Go West, written by Peter Cox, Richard Drummie and Martin Page. It appeared in the film Pretty Woman, starring Richard Gere and Julia Roberts, and was later included on Go West's third studio album, Indian Summer, in 1992.

In terms of the group's discography, "King of Wishful Thinking" has become their best known song. The track reached number three in Canada, number six in Australia, number eight on both the US Billboard Hot 100 and Cash Box Top 100 charts, and number 18 in the United Kingdom. At the 1991 Brit Awards, the song was nominated for the Brit Award for British Video of the Year.

== Critical reception ==
Music journalist Hannah Dailey of the US publication Billboard has labeled the song as "one of the crown jewels of ’90s classic hits".

== Music video ==
The song's official music video is known for including various absurdist elements alongside the pop duo as they act on a solid white stage. It was produced, directed and written by Paul Flattery and Jim Yukich of FYI. Though the film does not outwardly utilize film clips from Pretty Woman, outside of brief glimpses superimposed on actual celluloid, the video includes lookalikes of Julia Roberts and Richard Gere (dressed as his character from An Officer and a Gentleman). An actor playing Roy Orbison, performer of the titular song from the film, also appears.

In 2018, actor Paul Rudd and late-night host Jimmy Fallon made a shot-for-shot recreation of the music video for The Tonight Show. Some elements such as a dancing Pope, zebras, and a trained circus elephant, present in the original video, were not reproduced in the remake. American band the Roots made a cameo appearance.

== Track listings ==
UK 7-inch and cassette single

1. "The King of Wishful Thinking" – 4:00
2. "Tears Too Late" – 4:25

UK CD single

1. "The King of Wishful Thinking" – 4:00
2. "The King of Wishful Thinking" (Jon Gass US 12-inch) – 5:49
3. "Tears Too Late" – 4:25
4. "The King of Wishful Thinking" (acapella) – 2:45
- The UK 12-inch single switches tracks one and two.

US and Canadian cassette single

1. "King of Wishful Thinking" (LP version)
2. "King of Wishful Thinking" (power mix)

== Personnel ==
Go West

- Peter Cox – lead vocals, backing vocals, keyboards
- Richard Drummie – keyboards, guitars, backing vocals

Additional musicians

- Peter Wolf – keyboards, drum programming
- David Williams – guitars
- Dan Higgins – saxophones
- Larry Williams – saxophones
- Gary Grant – trumpet
- Jerry Hey – trumpet, horn arrangements
- Lynn Davis – backing vocals
- Phillip Ingram – backing vocals
- Dorian Holley – backing vocals
- Alfie Silas – backing vocals

== Charts ==
=== Weekly charts ===
Chart (1990)	Peak position
Australia (ARIA)	6
Canada Top Singles (RPM)	3
Canada Adult Contemporary (RPM)	4
Europe (Eurochart Hot 100)	49
Germany (GfK)	46
Ireland (IRMA)	23
New Zealand (Recorded Music NZ)	24
Sweden (Sverigetopplistan)	20
UK Singles (Official Charts)	18
US Billboard Hot 100	8
US Adult Contemporary (Billboard)	7
US Cash Box Top 100	8

=== Year-end charts ===
Chart (1990)	Position
Australia (ARIA)	62
Canada Top Singles (RPM)	35
Canada Adult Contemporary (RPM)	40
US Billboard Hot 100	70
US Adult Contemporary (Billboard)	44

== Certifications ==
Region	Certification	Certified units/sales
Australia (ARIA)	Gold	35,000^{^}
New Zealand (RMNZ)	Platinum	30,000^{‡}
United Kingdom (BPI)	Gold	400,000^{‡}
^{^} Shipments figures based on certification alone.^{‡} Sales+streaming figures based on certification alone.

== Covers ==
- New Found Glory covered the song for their 2007 album From the Screen to Your Stereo Part II.
- MUNA covered the song on Sirius XMU Sessions in June 2026
- Stephanie White and the Philth Harmonic covered the song on their 2009 album This Is Why We Can't Have Nice Things.

== See also ==
- 1990 in music
