= Cat in the Hat (Bobby Caldwell album) =

Studio album by Bobby Caldwell
- Released: March 28, 1980
- Recorded: 1979–1980
- Studio: Criteria Studios (Miami)
- Genres: R&B; Soul
- Length: 32:25
- Label: Clouds
- Producers: Bobby Caldwell; Steve Kimball

Bobby Caldwell chronology
Bobby Caldwell (1978)	Cat in the Hat (1980)	Carry On (1982)

Singles from Cat in the Hat
- 1. "Coming Down from Love" Released: March 1980; 2. "To Know What You've Got" Released: 1980

Cat in the Hat is the second studio album by American singer-songwriter Bobby Caldwell. It was released on March 28, 1980, through the Clouds imprint of TK Records.

The album debuted on the Billboard Top LPs & Tape chart in the issue dated March 29, 1980, peaking at No. 113. it also debuted on the Billboard Soul LP's chart, in the issue dated April 12, 1980, and remained on the chart for 15 weeks, peaking at No. 46.

The single "Coming Down from Love" peaked at No. 42 on the Billboard Hot 100 on April 12, 1980, spending a week at No. 42. It reached No. 94 on the Cash Box singles chart, and No. 28 on the Billboard Hot Rhythm & Blues Singles chart.

== Reception ==
Professional ratings
Review scores
Source	Rating
AllMusic	3/5 stars
Cash Box	7.98/10.00 stars
The Encyclopedia of Popular Music	2/5 stars

Tim Griggs of AllMusic stated that "Cat in the Hat showcases his sophisticated songwriting and soulful vocals. Though not as commercially successful as his debut, Cat In the Hat is no sophomore slump artistically.

On the other hand, The Encyclopedia of Popular Music gave the album a two-star rating only, meaning that they believed that album was "flawed or lacking in some way."

== Track listing ==
All tracks are written by Bobby Caldwell, with additional writers noted.

Side one
No.	Title	Length
1.	"Coming Down from Love"	4:01
2.	"Wrong or Right"	4:56
3.	"To Know What You've Got"	3:08
4.	"You Promised Me"	4:01

Side two
No.	Title	Writer(s)	Length
5.	"It's Over"		2:56
6.	"Open Your Eyes"	Bruce Malament	3:43
7.	"Mother of Creation"	Malament; Harold Seay; John Paulus	5:05
8.	"I Don't Want To Lose Your Love"		4:35
Total length:			32:25

== Personnel ==
=== Musicians ===
- Bobby Caldwell – all vocals, acoustic piano, keyboards, synthesizers, guitars, bass, drums, vibraphone, arrangements
- Bruce Malament – keyboards, synthesizers
- George "Chocolate" Perry – bass
- John Paulus – bass
- Harold Seay – drums
- Andy Newmark – drums
- Joe Galdo – drums
- Ed Greene – drums
- Mike Lewis – saxophones, horn arrangements (1)
- Chris Colclessor – saxophones, clarinet
- Mark Colby – saxophones
- Gary Lindsay – saxophones, clarinet
- James Marshall – trombone
- Jeffrey Kievit – trumpet, flugelhorn
- Hollis Burridge – trumpet, flugelhorn
- Jerry Peel – French horn

=== Production ===
- Henry Marx – executive producer, management
- Bobby Caldwell – producer
- Steve Kimball – producer, engineer
- Don Gehman – engineer
- Rick Allison – assistant engineer
- Joe Foglia – assistant engineer
- Sheilah "Sam" Taylor – assistant engineer
- Linda Fine – production coordinator
- Jeff Dunas – photography

== Charts ==
=== Year-end charts ===
Chart (1980)	Position
US Billboard 200	113
US Top R&B/Hip-Hop Albums (Billboard)	46

=== Singles ===
Year	Single	Chart positions		
Year	Single	US Hot 100	US R&B	US Cashbox
1980	"Coming Down from Love"	42	28	94

== Certifications ==
Certifications for Cat in the Hat
Region	Certification	Certified units/sales
Japan (RIAJ)	Platinum	200,000^{^}
United States (RIAA)	Gold	500,000^{^}
^{^} Shipments figures based on certification alone.
