= Don't Look Down (Go West song) =

Single by Go West

from the album Go West / Dancing on the Couch (American version)
- B-side: "Remix"
- Released: 11 November 1985 (UK); 1987 (US)
- Length: 3:55 (original album version); 4:20 ("Don't Look Down- The Sequel")
- Label: Chrysalis
- Songwriters: Peter Cox; Richard Drummie
- Producer: Gary Stevenson

Go West singles chronology
"Eye to Eye" (1985)	"Don't Look Down" (1985)	"One Way Street" (1986)

"Don't Look Down" is a song by the English pop duo Go West, first featured on the band's self-titled debut album in 1985. The song was remixed later in the year and released as a single under the title "Don't Look Down – The Sequel". It reached No. 13 on the UK singles chart, No. 10 in Ireland, and No. 15 in New Zealand. Two years later, this version of the song was released to the American market and appeared on the American version of the band's second studio album Dancing on the Couch (1987). This single became their first top 40 hit in the US, reaching No. 39.
