= Bobby Caldwell (album) =

Studio album by Bobby Caldwell
- Released: October 22, 1978
- Recorded: 1978
- Studio: TK (Hialeah)
- Genres: R&B; disco; jazz
- Length: 34:08
- Label: Clouds
- Producers: Ann Holloway; Marsha Radcliffe; George "Chocolate" Perry

Bobby Caldwell chronology
Bobby Caldwell (1978)	Cat in the Hat (1980)

Singles from Bobby Caldwell
- 1. "What You Won't Do for Love" Released: September 1978; 2. "My Flame" Released: 1979; 3. "Can't Say Goodbye" Released: 1979

Bobby Caldwell (reissued on CD as What You Won't Do for Love) is the debut studio album by American singer-songwriter Bobby Caldwell. It was released on October 22, 1978, through the Clouds imprint of TK Records.

The album debuted on the Billboard Top LPs & Tape chart in the issue dated November 18, 1978, and remained on the chart for 31 weeks, peaking at No. 21. it also debuted on the Billboard Soul LP's chart, in the issue dated November 25, 1978, and remained on the chart for 28 weeks, peaking at No. 7.

The single "What You Won't Do for Love" debuted on the Billboard Hot 100 on December 23, 1978, spending three weeks at No. 9 during a 20-week run. It also reached No. 10 on the Cash Box singles chart during its 19-week run, No. six on the Billboard Hot Rhythm & Blues Singles during its 23-week run, and No. 10 on the Billboard Easy Listening chart during its 16-week run.

== Reception ==
Professional ratings
Review scores
Source	Rating
AllMusic	3/5 stars
The Encyclopedia of Popular Music	3/5 stars

M.F. DiBella of AllMusic notes "While a few of the compositions echo the dying grip of disco and some of Caldwell's vocal arrangements sound more like a hipper version of Tony Bennett ("Can't Say Goodbye"), the crooner does possess the pipes to carry the offering. Caldwell even tries his hand at the experimental on the short but sweet instrumental "Kalimba Song." Time will likely render much of Bobby Caldwell disposable, but at the album's best, the songs do carry a singular sound and contain the power to place themselves in a time period, which may just be good enough for lovers.

Billboard notes that "This album is an excellent showcase for Caldwell to display his multi-talents, in addition to handling the smooth vocals."

Cash Box stated that "The majority of the album's songs display a propelling disco beat, but Caldwell is able to inject an imaginative, expressive lyrical texture through his insightful compositions and Stevie Wonder-styled voice."

Record World stated that the album showed "Bobby's style and format reaches all ends of the spectrum and back."

== Track listing ==
All tracks are written by Bobby Caldwell, with additional writers noted.

Side one
No.	Title	Writer(s)	Length
1.	"Special to Me"	Marsha Radcliffe; Deborah F. Shane	3:31
2.	"My Flame"		4:12
3.	"Love Won't Wait"		4:08
4.	"Can't Say Goodbye"	George "Chocolate" Perry	5:03

Side two
No.	Title	Writer(s)	Length
5.	"Come to Me"	Sax Kari	2:52
6.	"What You Won't Do for Love"	Alfons Kettner	4:46
7.	"Kalimba Song"		1:19
8.	"Take Me Back to Then"		3:30
9.	"Down for the Third Time"		4:48
Total length:			34:08

== Personnel ==
=== Musicians ===
- Bobby Caldwell – all vocals, acoustic piano, keyboards, synthesizers, guitars, bass
- Benny Latimore – keyboards
- Alfons Kettner – guitars
- Steve Mealy – guitars
- George "Chocolate" Perry – bass
- Richie Valesquez – bass
- Ed Greene – drums
- Joe Galdo – drums
- Harold Seay – drums
- Mike Lewis – horn and string arrangements

=== Production ===
- Marsha Radcliffe – producer (1, 2)
- Ann Holloway – producer (3, 5–9)
- George "Chocolate" Perry – producer (4)
- Henry Marx – management

== Charts ==
=== Weekly charts ===
Chart (1979)	Peak position
Canada Top Albums/CDs (RPM)	35
US Billboard 200	21
US Top R&B/Hip-Hop Albums (Billboard)	7

=== Year-end charts ===
Chart (1979)	Position
US Billboard 200	75
US Top R&B/Hip-Hop Albums (Billboard)	26

=== Singles ===
Year	Single	Chart positions			
Year	Single	US	US R&B	US AC	US Cashbox
1979	"What You Won't Do for Love"	9	6	10	10

== Certifications ==
Certifications for What You Won't Do For Love
Region	Certification	Certified units/sales
Japan (RIAJ)	Gold	100,000^{^}
United States (RIAA)	2× Platinum	2,000,000^{^}
^{^} Shipments figures based on certification alone.

== Release history ==
Release formats for What You Won't Do For Love
Region	Date	Label	Format	Catalog	Notes
United States	1978	Clouds	LP, cassette, 8-track	CCL 8804	
Canada	1978	TK Records; CBS	LP, cassette	PTK 92032	
Worldwide	1978	TK Records; CBS	LP, cassette	TKR 83362	
Japan	1978	TK Records; CBS/Sony	LP, cassette	2AP 1354	
Japan	1988	Idler's Records; Polydor	CD, LP	P28P-25083, 18MM 0668	
Japan	2004–2005	Victor	CD	VICP-62941, VICP-63191	
Worldwide	2010s	Big Deal Records; The Orchard; Sony Music; Legacy	Streaming		
