= What You Won't Do for Love (song) =

1978 single by Bobby Caldwell

- U.S. red heart-shaped vinyl limited edition

Single by Bobby Caldwell

from the album Bobby Caldwell
- B-side: "Love Won't Wait"
- Released: September 1978
- Recorded: 1978
- Genre: Jazz fusion; blue-eyed soul; R&B
- Length: 4:45 (album version); 3:30 (single version)
- Label: Clouds (US); TK (international)
- Songwriters: Bobby Caldwell; Alfons Kettner
- Producer: Ann Holloway

Bobby Caldwell singles chronology
"The House Is Rockin'" (1976)	"What You Won't Do for Love" (1978)	"My Flame" (1979)

"What You Won't Do for Love" is a song by American singer-songwriter Bobby Caldwell. It was released in September 1978 as the lead single from his eponymous debut album (1978). It was written by Caldwell and Alfons Kettner, and produced by Ann Holloway. The song has been covered and sampled numerous times, including by Tupac Shakur in the posthumous 1998 hit "Do for Love".

== Background and release ==
After gaining a reputation in Miami clubs as a talented musician, Caldwell was signed to an exclusive contract with TK Records in 1978 by TK Records president Henry Stone. Heading to the studio, Caldwell recorded his first album, which was given a redo after Stone felt the album was good but "didn't have a hit". Caldwell returned to the studio and came up with the final product, which included "What You Won't Do for Love". The song's horn arrangement was written and recorded by Miami arranger Mike Lewis. The song is in the key of F-sharp minor (although the pitch of the commercial track is slightly flat – i.e., below concert pitch – perhaps due to tape machine speed variation).

Caldwell wanted the song to be the sixth track on the album since he figured his debut album's second track, "My Flame", which featured him playing guitar, would be the hit. However, TK Records felt confident that "What You Won't Do for Love" would be the breakout hit. When it was released to R&B radio, TK Records did their best to hide Caldwell's racial identity, hoping not to alienate their predominantly African American audience. However, when Caldwell began making performances live onstage, demand only increased.

== Chart performance ==
The song would become Caldwell's most successful single and also his signature song, reaching number nine on the US Billboard Hot 100, number six on the Hot Selling Soul Singles chart, and number ten on the Easy Listening chart. In Canada the song reached number 16 on the pop charts, and number 24 on the AOR charts.

According to the broadcast of American Top 40 for the week ending February 3, 1979, the week in which the song debuted at No. 38 on the Top 40, a heart-shaped pressing of the single was the most expensive single up to that point. The heart-shaped single was originally released as a promotional item only, but public demand led to 50,000 copies being pressed in time for Valentine's Day 1979 with a retail price of $7.98—about the price of a full LP album at the time.

After Caldwell's death on March 14, 2023, "What You Won't Do for Love" saw an increase in popularity. In the United Kingdom, the song charted at number 86 on the Singles Downloads Chart Top 100 on March 17, 2023.

== Charts ==
=== Weekly charts ===
Chart (1978–1979)	Peak position
Canada Top Singles (RPM)	16
Canada Adult Contemporary (RPM)	24
US Billboard Hot 100	9
US Adult Contemporary (Billboard)	10
US R&B (Billboard)	6
US Cash Box Top 100	10

Chart (2023)	Rank
UK Singles Downloads (Official Charts)	86

=== Year-end charts ===
Chart (1979)	Rank
Canada Top Singles (RPM)	128
US Billboard Hot 100	59
US Cash Box Top 100	88

== Certifications ==
Region	Certification	Certified units/sales
United Kingdom (BPI)	Silver	200,000^{‡}
^{‡} Sales+streaming figures based on certification alone.

== Roy Ayers version ==
American jazz-funk composer and producer Roy Ayers released his version on his 1979 album No Stranger to Love.

=== Charts ===
Chart (1980)	Peak position
US Hot R&B/Hip-Hop Songs (Billboard)	73

== Go West version ==
"What You Won't Do for Love"

Single by Go West

from the album Indian Summer
- B-side: "Masque of Love" (Schoolhouse mix)
- Released: January 4, 1993
- Length: 4:24
- Label: Chrysalis
- Songwriters: Bobby Caldwell; Alfons Kettner
- Producer: Ron Fair

Go West singles chronology
"Faithful" (1992)	"What You Won't Do for Love" (1993)	"Still in Love" (1993)

Audio
- "What You Won't Do for Love" on YouTube

English pop duo Go West recorded a version of "What You Won't Do for Love" on their third studio album, Indian Summer (1992), and released it as a single on January 4, 1993 by Chrysalis Records.

=== Charts ===
==== Weekly charts ====
Chart (1993)	Peak position
Australia (ARIA)	122
Canada Top Singles (RPM)	12
Canada Adult Contemporary (RPM)	1
Europe (Eurochart Hot 100)	54
Europe (European Hit Radio)	19
Germany (GfK)	52
Iceland (Íslenski Listinn Topp 40)	31
UK Singles (Official Charts)	15
UK Airplay (Music Week)	5
US Billboard Hot 100	55
US Adult Contemporary (Billboard)	3
US Top 40/Mainstream (Billboard)	36
US Cash Box Top 100	50

==== Year-end charts ====
Chart (1993)	Rank
Canada Top Singles (RPM)	100
Canada Adult Contemporary (RPM)	36
US Adult Contemporary (Billboard)	27

== Boyz II Men version ==
Vocal R&B group Boyz II Men released a cover of the song on their 2004 album Throwback, Vol. 1, featuring rapper MC Lyte.

=== Charts ===
Chart (2004)	Peak position
US Hot R&B Singles (Billboard)	60

== In popular culture ==
The song plays over the ending of the Black-ish episode "Love, Boat" to both punctuate a romantic scene as well as make reference to an earlier line in the episode where Dre recalls the time he comforted his mother after she learned Bobby Caldwell was white.

In 2024, the song gained a resurgence of popularity after a TikTok video was released with a video of chocolate-covered strawberries went viral. At that time, when it is edited, it received over 50 million likes and over 450 million views, making it one of the most liked TikTok videos. This caused the song to surge to number #1 on the TikTok Billboard Top 50 for one week.
