= Martin Page =

- Born: Martin George Page; 23 September 1959 (age 67); Southampton, England
- Genres: New wave; pop; pop rock; soft rock; adult contemporary
- Occupations: Musician; producer
- Instruments: Vocals; bass guitar
- Years active: 1981–present
- Labels: Mercury; Ironing Board
- Formerly of: Tight Fit; Q-Feel
- Website: martinpage.com

Martin George Page (born 23 September 1959) is an English singer-songwriter and bassist. Page has collaborated with artists such as Paul Young, Starship, Robbie Robertson, Earth, Wind & Fire, Heart, Robbie Williams and Go West.

== Early life ==
Page was born in Southampton, Hampshire, England, to Alan Richard Page (an aviation engineer) and Ruth Pamela Page. During a good portion of his childhood, Martin moved with his family from military base to military base as a result of his father's career. During those times, he stated that he spent much of his time listening to Peter Gabriel, the Beatles and Motown.

== Career ==
Page formed the pop group Q-Feel with his friend Brian Fairweather. Q-Feel experienced success with hit single "Dancing in Heaven (Orbital Be-Bop)". Soon after, Page and Fairweather moved to Los Angeles, where they met music executive Diane Poncher. She saw potential in Page and Fairweather and eventually became their manager.

At first Page and Fairweather collaborated with artists such as Kim Carnes, on her 1983 album Cafe Racers, Earth, Wind & Fire on their 1983 LP Electric Universe, and Barbra Streisand on her 1984 album Emotion. Page also played keyboards for Ray Parker Jr., on the 1984 Ghostbusters theme song. Page then went on to work with Elton John's frequent lyricist Bernie Taupin. The duo performed on Maurice White's 1985 self titled album and wrote "We Built This City" for Starship's 1985 LP Knee Deep in the Hoopla together with "These Dreams" on Heart's 1985 album Heart, both of which reached number one on the Billboard Hot 100. Page later co-wrote songs for Neil Diamond's 1986 LP Headed for the Future, Lee Ritenour's 1986 album Earth Run, and Chaka Khan's 1986 LP Destiny.

He again collaborated with Taupin on his 1987 album Tribe and co-wrote a song for Atlantic Starr's 1987 LP All in the Name of Love. Page also co-wrote for Starship's 1987 LP No Protection and collaborated with Robbie Robertson on his 1987 self-titled album. That album has been certified gold in the UK by the BPI.

Page went on to write for Earth, Wind & Fire's 1988 LP The Best of Earth, Wind & Fire, Vol. 2. Page was also a co-producer on Tom Jones's 1988 LP Move Closer and Paul Young's 1990 album Other Voices. Other Voices has been certified gold in the UK by the BPI. He then co-produced Robbie Robertson's Grammy Award-nominated 1991 LP Storyville. He later co-wrote Go West's hit singles "King of Wishful Thinking" and "Faithful". He co-wrote the title song "Sing" for the soundtrack of the film of the same name.

Page has also collaborated with Robbie Williams and Josh Groban.

== Solo work ==
During 1994, Page issued his debut solo album In the House of Stone and Light. The title track, which he wrote reflecting on a visit to the Grand Canyon, was issued the same year. As a single, "In the House of Stone and Light" reached No. 14 on the Billboard Hot 100.

Soon afterwards, his parents and some close friends died. He returned to the studio in 2008 to record his second album, In the Temple of the Muse for IroningBoard Records, an independent label started by Page and Poncher. Among the songs on In the Temple of the Muse are Page's recordings of "Mi Morena" and "Blessed" (a song that Page described as a "commitment song").

Page's third album, A Temper of Peace, was released in 2012 followed in 2015 by Hotel of the Two Worlds. In 2017, he issued his fifth album, The Slender Sadness (The Love Songs). In 2018, he released The Amber of Memory, his first album of instrumental music.

In late 2019, Page started a music podcast for his unreleased songs called Radio OwlsNest. By the end of 2023, he concluded it with its fiftieth episode. His seventh studio album, The Poetry of Collisions, was released digitally on 10 November 2020. Page released his eighth studio album, Fugitive Pieces, on 19 April 2021. Later in the same year, Page announced his ninth album, called The Occupation of Hope, his second instrumental album. It was released on 15 November 2021. Page released his second volume of The Poetry of Collisions, his tenth overall, on 11 July 2022.

In early 2024 Page started another music podcast called Going Down The Rabbit Hole, of music he was inspired by and he continues to do podcast specials for his latest releases. In late 2024, he introduced his own Bandcamp store. On the same platform, Page announced his eleventh album, The First and Last Freedom. It was released on 2 June 2025. In 2026 Page collaborated with former Q-Feel musician Brian Fairweather with their album Bandages of Grace. It was released on 30 June 2026. The same year he announced his next album, Bewintered, his first season-themed album, set to be released on 1 December.

== Personal life ==
Page lives in Southern California.

== Discography ==
=== Albums ===
| Year | Album | Chart | Position | Record label |
|---|---|---|---|---|
| 1994 | In the House of Stone and Light | Billboard 200 | 161 | Mercury |

==== Independent releases ====
| Year | Album |
|---|---|
| 2008 | In the Temple of the Muse |
| 2012 | A Temper of Peace |
| 2015 | Hotel of the Two Worlds |
| 2017 | The Slender Sadness (The Love Songs) |
| 2018 | The Amber of Memory |
| 2020 | The Poetry of Collisions Vol. 1 |
| 2021 | Fugitive Pieces |
| 2021 | The Occupation of Hope |
| 2022 | The Poetry of Collisions Vol. 2 |
| 2025 | The First and Last Freedom |
| 2026 | Bandages of Grace (Note: With Brian Fairweather) |
| 2026 | Bewintered |

=== Singles ===
| Year | Single | Chart | Position | Album |
|---|---|---|---|---|
| 1994 | "In the House of Stone and Light" | US Billboard Hot Adult Contemporary | 1 | In the House of Stone and Light |
| 1994 | "In the House of Stone and Light" | US Billboard Hot 100 | 14 | In the House of Stone and Light |
| 1995 | "In the House of Stone and Light" | US Billboard Top 40 Mainstream | 9 | In the House of Stone and Light |
| 1995 | "Keeper of the Flame" | US Billboard Hot Adult Contemporary | 19 | In the House of Stone and Light |
| 1995 | "Keeper of the Flame" | US Billboard Hot 100 | 83 | In the House of Stone and Light |
| 1995 | "Put on Your Red Dress" | | | In the House of Stone and Light |

== Music videos ==
List of music videos, showing year released and directors
| Title | Year | Director(s) |
|---|---|---|
| "In the House of Stone and Light" | 1994 | Matt Mahurin |
| "Keeper of the Flame" | 1995 | Nigel Dick |
| "Blessed" | 2008 | Mike Rodriguez |
| "Mi Morena" | 2008 | Mike Rodriguez |
