= Bobby Caldwell =

American singer and songwriter (1951–2023)

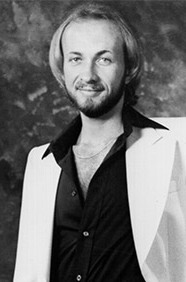
- Caldwell in 1976

Background information
- Born: Robert Hunter Caldwell; August 15, 1951; New York City, New York, U.S.
- Died: March 14, 2023 (aged 71) Great Meadows, New Jersey, U.S.
- Genres: R&B; blue-eyed soul; smooth jazz; pop rock; soft rock; adult contemporary; traditional pop
- Occupations: Vocalist; songwriter; musician
- Instruments: Vocals; guitar; piano
- Years active: 1968–2020
- Labels: Warner Music Group; TK Records; Atlantic Records; Polydor Records; Sin-Drome Records

Robert Hunter Caldwell (August 15, 1951 – March 14, 2023) was an American singer, songwriter, and musician. He released several albums spanning R&B, soul, jazz, and adult contemporary, and was known for his soulful and versatile vocals. He released the hit single and his signature song "What You Won't Do for Love" from his double platinum debut self-titled album in 1978.

After several R&B and smooth jazz albums, Caldwell turned to singing standards from the Great American Songbook. He wrote many songs for other artists, including the Billboard Hot 100 No. 1 single "The Next Time I Fall" for Amy Grant and Peter Cetera. Caldwell's musical catalog is perhaps best known today for its later sampling by several prolific hip hop and R&B artists.

== Early life ==
Bobby Caldwell was born in Manhattan and grew up in Miami. His mother sold real estate and one of her clients was reggae singer Bob Marley. Caldwell and Marley became friends. Caldwell was exposed to a variety of music including Latin, reggae, and R&B. His parents hosted a local variety television show called Suppertime. He grew up listening to the music of Frank Sinatra and Ella Fitzgerald. When he was 12, Caldwell began to play piano and guitar. He was drawn to rock and roll, jazz, and rhythm and blues.

== Career ==
In the late 1960s when based in Miami, Caldwell formed the group Katmandu alongside keyboardist Norman "Norm" Harris (who would later found Norman's Rare Guitars), guitarist Bob Jabo, and drummer Kenny Zale. While performing blues rock and R&B at Miami clubs and recording at Criteria Studios, the young band caught the attention of rock and roll pioneer Little Richard. Managed by Little Richard and his brother Peyton Penniman, the band was convinced to relocate to Los Angeles, California, to chase a major record deal, releasing a self-titled album on Mainstream Records in 1971.

Following the move to California, Katmandu dissolved. Caldwell remained in Los Angeles, working as a rhythm guitarist for Little Richard's backing band before launching his solo career. Throughout the mid-to-late 1970s, Caldwell maintained a close musical relationship with his former bandmate Norm Harris. While Harris worked by day building his vintage guitar business, Caldwell occasionally joined Harris's Los Angeles-based blues group, the Angel City Rhythm Band (which also featured guitarist Rick Vito), participating in local jams and backing up legendary visiting blues artists like Albert Collins.

He and his band eventually left Little Richard and Caldwell went solo. By 1977, Caldwell had spent six years in Los Angeles playing in different bar bands and trying to get a record deal. He eventually signed with TK Records in Miami in 1978. After songs for his first album were recorded, executives told Caldwell they enjoyed the album, but thought it was lacking a hit. He returned to the studio for two days and wrote "What You Won't Do for Love". TK was mainly an R&B label popular among African American listeners. Executives at the label wanted to conceal how Caldwell was white, so they kept his face off the album cover. When he toured with Natalie Cole to support the album, most of the audience was black and many were surprised to learn Caldwell was white.

"What You Won't Do for Love" on Bobby Caldwell reached the top ten on the Billboard magazine Hot 100 (No. 9) R&B (No. 6), and Adult Contemporary (No. 10) charts. The song has been covered, remade and sampled many times, and Caldwell recorded a new version in 1998. Other interpretations were recorded by Go West, Phyllis Hyman, Roy Ayers, Michael Bolton, Intro, Boyz II Men, and Snoh Aalegra. The song was sampled by Tupac Shakur for his hit "Do for Love". It was covered by Elliott Yamin during the fifth season of American Idol in 2006. Caldwell's track "My Flame" is sampled for "Sky's the Limit" by The Notorious B.I.G. featuring R&B group 112.

Caldwell's debut album was followed by Cat in the Hat (1980) and Carry On (1982). For the album Carry On, he played all the instruments, was the producer, and helped with arranging and mixing. In 1983, Caldwell released August Moon only in Japan. It was released in the United States in the 1990s. Singer Boz Scaggs advised Caldwell to write songs for other musicians after TK Records shut down. Caldwell wrote "The Next Time I Fall", which became a hit for Amy Grant and Peter Cetera, along with songs for Scaggs himself, Roy Ayers, Chicago, Natalie Cole, Neil Diamond, Roberta Flack, and Al Jarreau.

On Blue Condition (1996), Caldwell turned from performing and recording R&B to recording big band arrangements of songs from the Great American Songbook, particularly those sung by Frank Sinatra. Caldwell also portrayed Sinatra in tributes to the Rat Pack in Las Vegas. Caldwell continued to sing standards on Come Rain or Come Shine (1999), The Consummate Bobby Caldwell (2010), and After Dark (2014). In 2015, he collaborated with record producer Jack Splash on the album Cool Uncle.'

== Influence ==
The Caldwell track "Open Your Eyes" from Cat in the Hat was sampled by J Dilla on Common's "The Light" from his 2000 album Like Water for Chocolate. "Open Your Eyes" was covered by John Legend and Dwele, from Detroit.

In 2019, the owner of the rights to the Caldwell song "Carry On" (from the album of the same name) sued Lil Nas X for $25 million for using the song without permission in his own song of the same name from his 2018 mixtape Nasaratti, which at the time was available on YouTube, Spotify, and SoundCloud.

== Death ==
Caldwell died at his home in Great Meadows, New Jersey on March 14, 2023, at 71. His death was announced the next day by his wife, Mary Beth Caldwell. According to his wife, his health had declined after suffering severe side effects from fluoroquinolone in 2017.

After Bobby Caldwell's death, his 1978 hit song "What You Won't Do for Love" experienced a surge in popularity on social media, such as on TikTok and Instagram. In early 2024, the song reached No. 1 on the TikTok Billboard Top 50 chart as well as a brief entry at No. 86 on the UK Singles Downloads Chart. That was due to a viral trend featuring videos of chocolate-covered strawberries paired with the song's signature horn intro.

== Film soundtracks ==
Caldwell wrote and performed songs for the movies Back to School ("Educated Girl"), Mac and Me ("Take Me, I'll Follow You"), Salsa ("Puerto Rico") and its sequel ("Every Teardrop"). He also recorded a song for the 1984 film Night of the Comet ("Never Give Up"). Due to a lower cost of use than the original recordings as cited in interviews, his versions of big band standards have appeared in several films. Examples include Simone (2001) and Lake Boat (2002).

Aside from acting in a minor role in 1988's Salsa, Caldwell portrayed Frank Sinatra from October 1999 to January 2000 in a Las Vegas musical, The Rat Pack Is Back.

== Discography ==
- Bobby Caldwell (1978)
- Cat in the Hat (1980)
- Carry On (1982)
- August Moon (1983)
- Heart of Mine (1989)
- Stuck on You (1991)
- Where Is Love (1993)
- Soul Survivor (1995)
- Blue Condition (1996)
- Come Rain or Shine (1999)
- Perfect Island Nights (2005)
- The Consummate Caldwell (2010)
- House of Cards (2012)
- After Dark (2014)
- Cool Uncle (2015)
