= Peter Cox (musician) =

English singer-songwriter

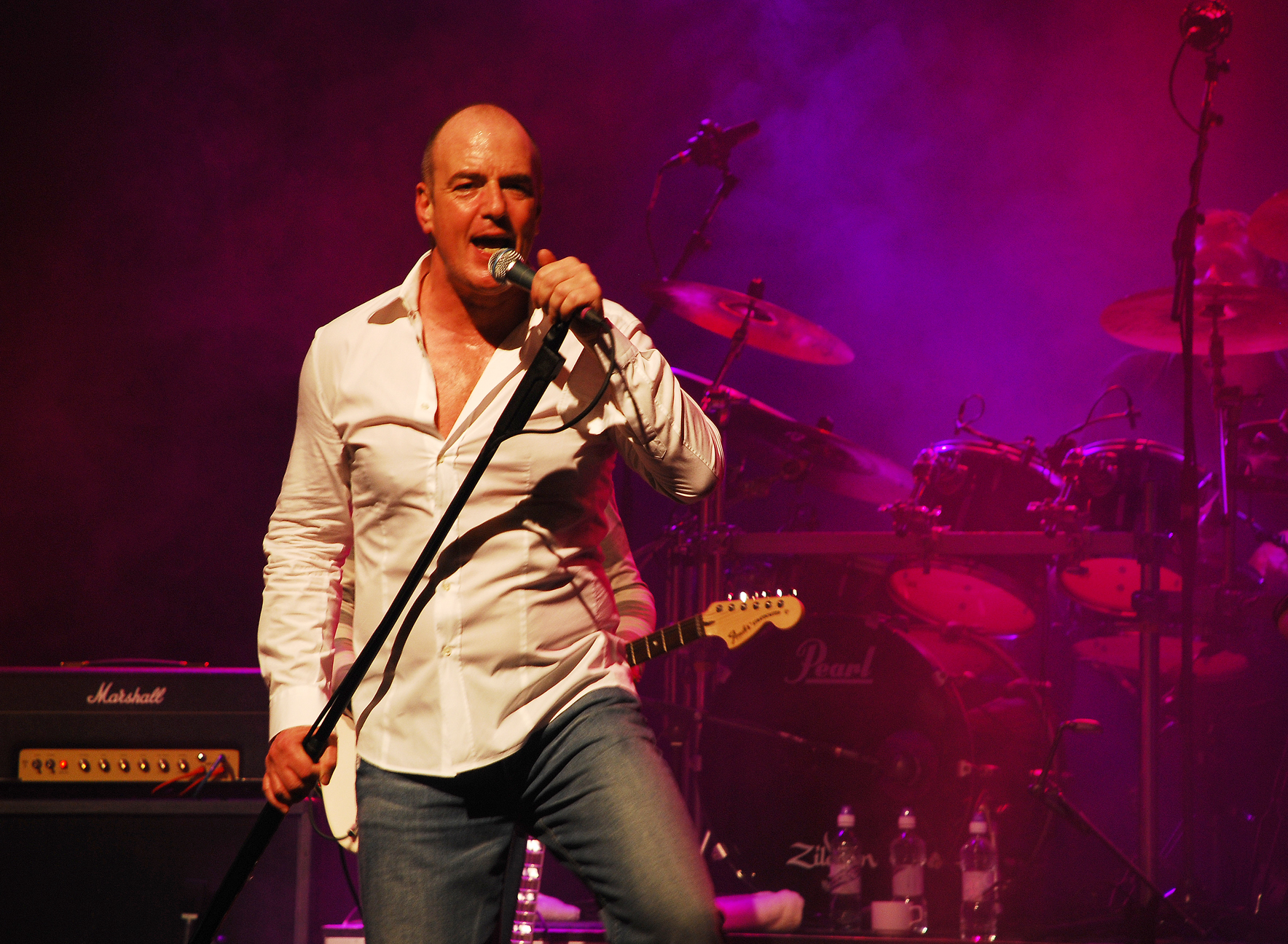
- Cox performing with Go West, 2008

Background information
- Born: Peter John Cox; 17 November 1955 (age 70); London, England
- Occupation: Singer-songwriter
- Member of: Go West
- Website: petercox.live

Peter John Cox (born 17 November 1955) is an English singer-songwriter. He is best known as the lead vocalist of the English pop duo Go West. As a solo artist, he had three top 40 hits on the UK singles chart in the 1990s.

== Early career and Go West ==
In 1982, Cox and Richard Drummie formed the duo Go West, with Cox as lead vocalist and Drummie on guitar and backing vocals. After Go West signed a deal with Chrysalis Records, "We Close Our Eyes" became a top 5 hit on the UK Singles Chart in 1985. The following year, Go West was named 'Best Newcomer' at the 1986 Brit Awards.

Other Top 20 UK singles by Go West include "Call Me", "Goodbye Girl", and "Don't Look Down".

In 1987, the band reached the top 40 in the US with the single "Don't Look Down – The Sequel". In 1990, Go West had a No. 8 hit in the US with "King of Wishful Thinking" from the film Pretty Woman. In 1992, the duo released their third studio album Indian Summer, which included "Faithful"; the song reached the top 20 in Canada and the United States.

As of 2026, Go West is still touring.

== Solo career ==
Cox moved to Los Angeles in 1993 to pursue a solo career. In the late 1990s, he released three singles that made the Top 40 on the UK charts: "Ain’t Gonna Cry Again", "If You Walk Away", and "What A Fool Believes".

In 2003, Cox replaced Then Jerico's Mark Shaw on the British reality television show Reborn in the USA after Shaw quit the series. Even though Cox had achieved previous success across the Atlantic as the lead vocalist of Go West, he was able to appear on the show as he was unknown in the US as a solo artist. He was a favourite to win, but was voted off in New York after he forgot the lyrics to the Norah Jones hit he was performing.

Cox's voice has been described as "smooth as silk" with a "gritty underbelly".

== Discography ==
=== Solo albums ===
- 1997: Peter Cox – Chrysalis – UK No. 64
- 2001: Flame Still Burns (EP) – Blueprint Records
- 2002: Nine Miles High (EP) – Blueprint Records
- 2004: Desert Blooms – Blueprint Records
- 2004: Tony Hadley vs Peter Cox & Go West – Blueprint Records
- 2005: Game for Fools (EP) – Blueprint Recording Corporation Ltd
- 2006: Motor City Music – Curb Records
- 2010: The S1 Sessions – Blueprint Recording Corporation Ltd
- 2012: Riding the Blinds – Blueprint Recording Corporation Ltd
- 2013: Damn the Brakes – Blueprint Recording Corporation Ltd
- 2023: Seaglass – Chrysalis Records

=== Solo singles ===
- "Ain't Gonna Cry Again" (1997) – UK No. 37
- "If You Walk Away" (1997) – UK No. 24
- "What a Fool Believes" (1998) – UK No. 39
