= Richard Drummie =

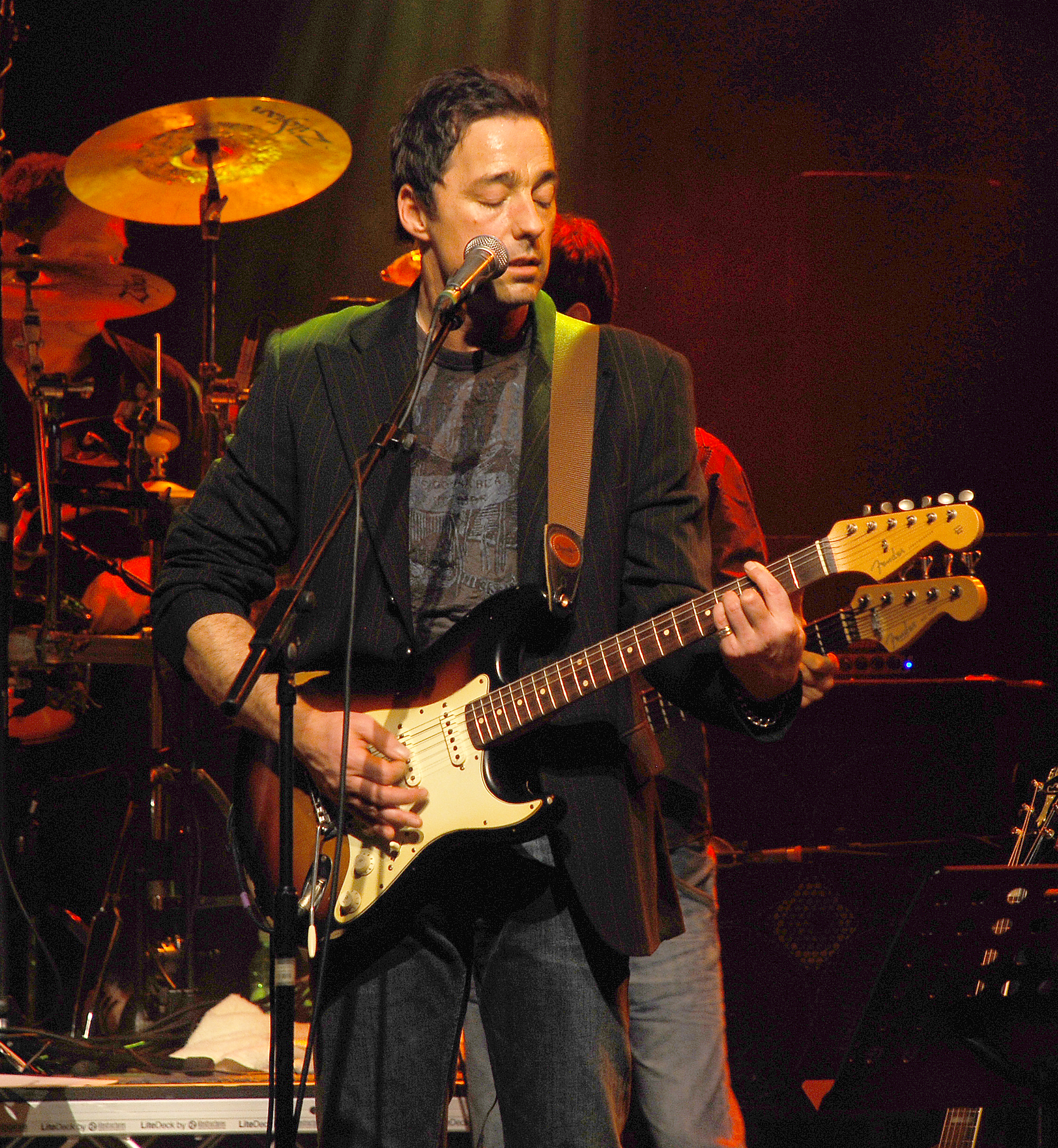
- Richard Drummie in concert in 2008

Background information
- Born: Richard Paul Drummie
- Occupations: Guitarist, backing vocalist
- Instruments: Vocals, guitar
- Label: Chrysalis
- Member of: Go West

Richard Paul Drummie is an English guitarist and backing vocalist. Drummie and Peter Cox are the founding members of the musical duo Go West.

== Career ==
In 1982, Drummie and Peter Cox (musician) formed the duo Go West, with Cox as lead vocalist and Drummie on guitar and backing vocals.

After Go West signed a deal with Chrysalis Records, "We Close Our Eyes" became a top 5 hit in the UK Singles Chart in 1985. The following year, Go West was named 'Best Newcomer' at the 1986 BRIT Awards.

Other Top 20 UK singles by Go West include "Call Me", "Goodbye Girl", and "Don't Look Down".

In 1987, the band reached the top 40 in the US with the single "Don't Look Down – The Sequel".

In 1990, Go West had a No. 8 hit in the US with "King of Wishful Thinking" from the film Pretty Woman. In 1992, the duo released their third studio album Indian Summer, which included "Faithful"; the song reached the top 20 in Canada and the United States.

As of 2026, Go West is still touring.

== Personal life ==
Drummie, who grew up in Skelmersdale and Ormskirk with his grandparents, has a son and a daughter. In 1993, he and Cox moved to Los Angeles, but Drummie returned to the United Kingdom in 1996.
