= Jefferson Airplane discography =

Cataloging of published recordings by Jefferson Airplane

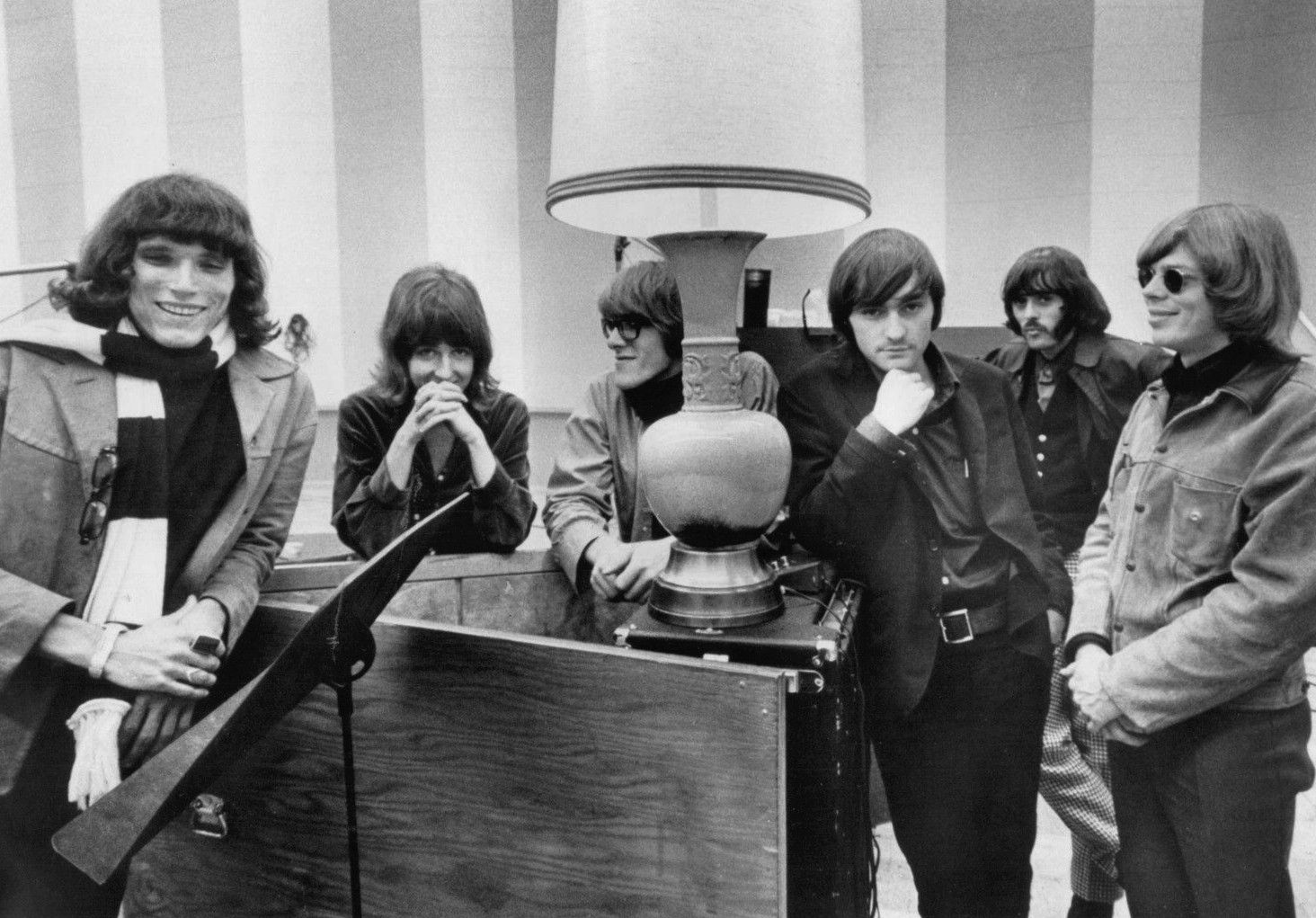
- Jefferson Airplane c. 1970
- Studio albums: 8
- Live albums: 10
- Compilation albums: 8
- Singles: 19
- Music videos: 8

The following is a comprehensive discography of Jefferson Airplane, an American rock band which formed in San Francisco in 1965.

== Albums ==
=== Studio albums ===
Year	Album details	Peak chart positions			Certification
Year	Album details	US	AUS	UK	Certification
1966	Jefferson Airplane Takes Off: Released: 15 August 1966; Label: RCA Victor (#LPM-3584); Format: LP, 8-track, CS, CD	128	—	—	
1967	Surrealistic Pillow: Released: 1 February 1967; Label: RCA Victor (#LSP-3766); Format: LP, 8-track, CS, CD	3	—	—	RIAA: Platinum
1967	After Bathing at Baxter's: Released: November 1967; Label: RCA Victor (#LOP-1511); Format: LP, 8-track, CS, CD	17	—	—	
1968	Crown of Creation: Released: September 1968; Label: RCA Victor (#LSP-4058); Format: LP, 8-track, CS, CD	6	—	—	RIAA: Gold
1969	Volunteers: Released: November 1969; Label: RCA Victor (#LSP-4238); Format: LP, 8-track, CS, CD	13	—	34	RIAA: Gold
1971	Bark: Released: September 1971; Label: Grunt (#FTR-1001); Format: LP, 8-track, CS, CD	11	39	42	RIAA: Gold
1972	Long John Silver: Released: June 1972; Label: Grunt (#FTR-1007); Format: LP, 8-track, CS, CD	20	—	30	RIAA: Gold
1989	Jefferson Airplane: Released: September 1989; Label: Epic (#EK 45271); Format: CD, CS, LP	85	—	—	
"—" denotes releases that did not chart or were not released in that territory.

=== Compilation and live albums ===
Year	Title	Chart positions			Certification
Year	Title	US	AUS	UK	Certification
1969	Bless Its Pointed Little Head	17	—	38	
1970	The Worst of Jefferson Airplane	12	28	—	RIAA: Platinum
1973	Thirty Seconds Over Winterland	52	—	—	
1974	Early Flight	110	—	—	
1977	Flight Log	37	—	—	RIAA: Gold
1987	2400 Fulton Street	138	—	—	
1992	Jefferson Airplane Loves You	—	—	—	
1998	Live at the Fillmore East	—	—	—	
1998	Jefferson Airplane • Jefferson Starship • Starship – Hits	—	—	—	
2001	Ignition	—	—	—	
2007	Sweeping Up the Spotlight	—	—	—	
2009	The Woodstock Experience	—	—	—	
2010	Live at the Fillmore Auditorium 10/15/66: Late Show – Signe’s Farewell	—	—	—	
2010	Grace's Debut	—	—	—	
2010	We Have Ignition	—	—	—	
2010	Return to the Matrix	—	—	—	
"—" denotes releases that did not chart or were not released in that territory.

=== Authorized UK releases ===
- Live at the Monterey Festival (1991)
- At Golden Gate Park (2006)
- At The Family Dog Ballroom (2007)
- Last Flight (2007)

=== Other compilation and live albums ===
- The Best of Jefferson Airplane (1980)
- Time Machine (1984)
- White Rabbit & Other Hits (1990)
- The Best of Jefferson Airplane (1992)
- Feed Your Head: Live '67–'69 (1996)
- Journey: The Best of Jefferson Airplane (1996)
- Jefferson Airplane and Beyond (1997)
- Through the Looking Glass (1999)
- The Roar of Jefferson Airplane (2001)
- Platinum & Gold Collection (2003)
- Cleared for Take Off (2003)
- The Best of Jefferson Airplane: Somebody to Love (2004)
- Fly Jefferson Airplane (DVD) (2004)
- The Essential Jefferson Airplane (2005)
- Best of Jefferson Airplane (2005)
- High Flying Bird: Live at the Monterey Festival (2006)
- The Very Best of Jefferson Airplane (2007)
- Feels Like '67 Again (2007), HHO Multimedia Ltd. London—Concerts during 1967 at the Winterland
- Plastic Fantastic Airplane (live from several concerts) (2008), HHO Multimedia Ltd. London
- Setlist: The Very Best of Jefferson Airplane Live (2010)

== Singles ==
Year	Title	B-side	Chart positions					Certifications	Album
Year	Title	B-side	US	US C/B	US Rock	US A/C	UK	Certifications	Album
1966	"It's No Secret"	"Runnin' 'Round This World"	—	—	—	—	—		Jefferson Airplane Takes Off
1966	"Come Up the Years"	"Blues from an Airplane"	—	—	—	—	—		Jefferson Airplane Takes Off
1966	"Bringing Me Down"	"Let Me In"	—	—	—	—	—		Jefferson Airplane Takes Off
1966	"My Best Friend"	"How Do You Feel?"	103	89	—	—	—		Surrealistic Pillow
1967	"Somebody to Love"	"She Has Funny Cars"	5	5	—	—	—	RIAA: Gold	Surrealistic Pillow
1967	"White Rabbit"	"Plastic Fantastic Lover"	8	6	—	—	—	RIAA: 2× Platinum	Surrealistic Pillow
1967	"The Ballad of You and Me and Pooneil"	"Two Heads"	42	24	—	—	—		After Bathing at Baxter's
1967	"Watch Her Ride"	"Martha"	61	37	—	—	—		After Bathing at Baxter's
1968	"Greasy Heart"	"Share a Little Joke"	98	77	—	—	—		Crown of Creation
1968	"Crown of Creation"	"Lather"	64	—	—	—	—		Crown of Creation
1969	"Plastic Fantastic Lover"	"The Other Side of This Life"	—	—	—	—	—		Bless Its Pointed Little Head
1969	"Volunteers"	"We Can Be Together"	65	60	—	—	—		Volunteers
1970	"Mexico"	"Have You Seen the Saucers?"	—	—	—	—	—		Early Flight
1971	"Pretty as You Feel"	"Wild Turkey"	60	35	—	—	—		Bark
1972	"Long John Silver"	"Milk Train"	—	—	—	—	—		Long John Silver
1972	"Twilight Double Leader"	"Trial by Fire"	—	—	—	—	—		Long John Silver
1989	"Summer of Love"	—N/a	—	—	—	15	—		Jefferson Airplane
1989	"Planes"	—N/a	—	—	24	—	—		Jefferson Airplane
1989	"True Love"	—N/a	—	—	—	—	—		Jefferson Airplane
"—" denotes releases that did not chart or were not released in that territory.
