= The Essential Jefferson Airplane =

Greatest hits album by Jefferson Airplane
- Released: April 26, 2005
- Recorded: 1965 – 1972
- Genre: Rock
- Length: 2:06:06
- Label: RCA; Legacy

Jefferson Airplane chronology
Cleared for Take Off (2003)	The Essential Jefferson Airplane (2005)	At Golden Gate Park (2006)

Professional ratings
Review scores
Source	Rating
AllMusic	4.5/5 stars
The Encyclopedia of Popular Music	4/5 stars
The Music Box	4.12/5 stars

The Essential Jefferson Airplane is a compilation of music from San Francisco rock band Jefferson Airplane spanning its entire career, excluding the brief reunion in 1989.

It follows their development from their beginnings in folk-rock through psychedelia to conventional rock genres.

== Track listing ==
=== Disc one ===
1. "Blues from an Airplane" – 2:12 from Jefferson Airplane Takes Off (1966)
2. "It's No Secret" – 2:39 from Jefferson Airplane Takes Off
3. "Come Up the Years" – 2:32 from Jefferson Airplane Takes Off
4. "She Has Funny Cars" – 3:09 from Surrealistic Pillow (1967)
5. "Somebody to Love" – 2:56 from Surrealistic Pillow
6. "Comin' Back to Me" – 5:15 from Surrealistic Pillow
7. "Embryonic Journey" – 1:54 from Surrealistic Pillow
8. "White Rabbit" – 2:32 from Surrealistic Pillow
9. "The Ballad of You and Me and Pooneil" – 4:32 from After Bathing at Baxter's (1967)
10. "Martha" (mono single version) – 3:27 from After Bathing at Baxter's
11. "The Last Wall of the Castle" – 2:42 from After Bathing at Baxter's
12. "Watch Her Ride" – 3:17 from After Bathing at Baxter's
13. "Lather" – 2:57 from Crown of Creation (1968)
14. "Crown of Creation" – 2:54 from Crown of Creation
15. "Greasy Heart" – 3:27 from Crown of Creation
16. "Share a Little Joke" (mono single version) – 3:06 from Crown of Creation

=== Disc two ===
1. "3/5 of a Mile in 10 Seconds" (live) – 4:46 from Bless Its Pointed Little Head (1969)
2. "Plastic Fantastic Lover" (live) – 3:51 from Bless Its Pointed Little Head
3. "We Can Be Together" – 5:47 from Volunteers (1969)
4. "Good Shepherd" – 4:21 from Volunteers
5. "Wooden Ships" – 6:25 from Volunteers
6. "Eskimo Blue Day" – 6:33 from Volunteers
7. "Volunteers" – 2:04 from Volunteers
8. "Have You Seen the Saucers?" – 3:36 b-side to "Mexico" (1970)
9. "Mexico" (single version) – 2:09 non-album single
10. "When the Earth Moves Again" – 3:56 from Bark (1971)
11. "Pretty as You Feel" – 4:30 from Bark
12. "Third Week in the Chelsea" – 4:36 from Bark
13. "Long John Silver" – 4:26 from Long John Silver (1972)
14. "Twilight Double Leader" – 4:44 from Long John Silver
15. "Feel So Good" (live) – 11:23 from Thirty Seconds Over Winterland (1973)
16. "Milk Train" (live) – 3:28 from Thirty Seconds Over Winterland
