= List of Jefferson Airplane members =

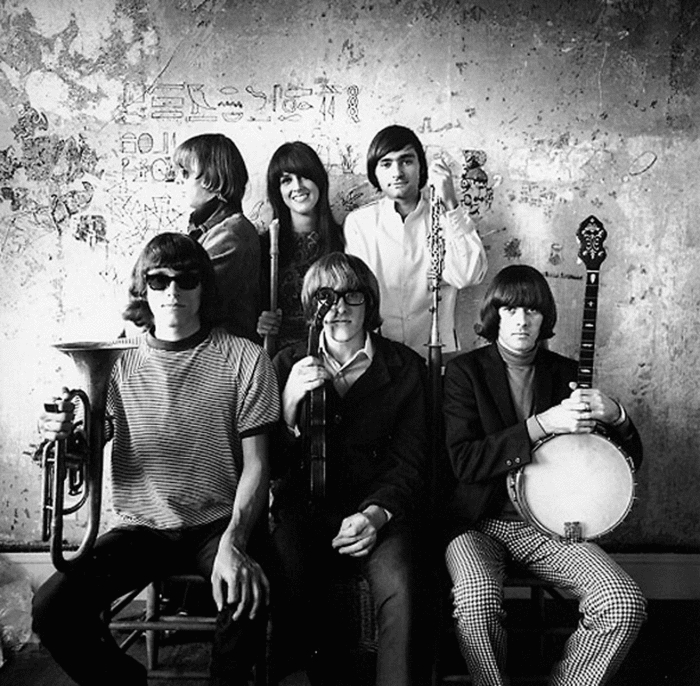
Jefferson Airplane in 1966. Clockwise from top left: Jack Casady, Grace Slick, Marty Balin, Spencer Dryden, Paul Kantner and Jorma Kaukonen.

Jefferson Airplane was an American psychedelic rock band from San Francisco, California. Formed in 1965, the group originally featured vocalist and rhythm guitarist Marty Balin, vocalist Signe Toly Anderson, lead guitarist and vocalist Jorma Kaukonen, rhythm guitarist and vocalist Paul Kantner, bassist Bob Harvey and drummer Jerry Peloquin. The band's 1966 to 1970 lineup of Balin, Kaukonen, Kantner, vocalist and keyboardist Grace Slick, bassist Jack Casady and drummer Spencer Dryden were inducted into the Rock and Roll Hall of Fame in 1996. Jefferson Airplane was active through 1972, after which Kaukonen and Casady departed to focus on their side project Hot Tuna and the remaining members eventually took on new members and reorganized as Jefferson Starship.

In 1989, Jefferson Airplane reformed for an album and tour, with Slick, Balin, Kaukonen, Kantner and Casady joined by session/touring musicians. A second reformation followed at the band's Rock and Roll Hall of Fame induction in 1996.

== History ==
Jefferson Airplane was formed in mid-1965 by vocalist and guitarist Marty Balin. He selected rhythm guitarist and vocalist Paul Kantner, to join the band, the two men then recruited the remaining initial members: vocalist Signe Toly Anderson, lead guitarist and vocalist Jorma Kaukonen, double bassist Bob Harvey and drummer Jerry Peloquin. Peloquin left a few weeks after the band's formation following an altercation with Kantner, with Alexander "Skip" Spence taking his place. Before the end of the year, Harvey was also fired and replaced by Jack Casady, who played electric bass, which was preferred by the band instead of double bass. Spence and Anderson both left in 1966 after the recording of Jefferson Airplane Takes Off, with Spence replaced by Spencer Dryden in May, and Anderson replaced by Grace Slick in October.

With Slick and Dryden, the lineup of Jefferson Airplane remained stable for more than three years, releasing a string of commercially successful albums. The roster remained stable until February 1970, when Dryden left Jefferson Airplane. Changing power dynamics within the group and the killing of Meredith Hunter at the Altamont Free Concert in 1969 led him to become increasingly dissatisfied, and after threatened to leave the band on numerous occasions, the rest of the members eventually decided to dismiss him.

Dryden was replaced by Joey Covington, a bandmate of Kaukonen, Kantner and Casady in Hot Tuna, who had previously performed percussion on the band's 1969 album Volunteers. In October 1970, violinist Papa John Creach (who had also performed with Hot Tuna) was added to the group's lineup. After continuing to tour throughout 1970, founding member Balin left Jefferson Airplane in April 1971 due to "long-standing ego clashes" with Kantner and Slick, as well as differing lifestyle choices and the death of Janis Joplin, which he explains "struck [him]".

Covington left after recording two songs during the sessions of Long John Silver in April 1972, with John Barbata replacing him for the rest of the recording and then staying on afterwards. David Freiberg, formerly of Quicksilver Messenger Service, joined the band for the album's promotional touring cycle as a replacement for Balin. Jefferson Airplane performed its final show on the Long John Silver tour on September 22, 1972, which ultimately proved to be the final performance of Jefferson Airplane's original tenure despite there being no formal announcement to that effect. Kaukonen and Casady returned to performing with Hot Tuna full time, while the remaining five members (Kantner, Slick, Freiberg, Barbata and Creach), would add new members and regroup under the name Jefferson Starship in January 1974.

Jefferson Airplane returned in 1989 with a self-titled album featuring Balin, Kaukonen, Kantner, Casady and Slick, along with drummer Kenny Aronoff and several additional guest contributors. The band toured in promotion of the release with keyboardist Tim Gorman and guitarists Randy Jackson and Peter Kaukonen (Jorma's brother). A second reunion followed in early 1996 when the band was inducted into the Rock and Roll Hall of Fame, with Balin, Kaukonen, Kantner, Casady and Dryden performing together for the first time since 1970; Slick was unable to attend the performance due to a foot injury which prevented her from traveling.

Several members have since died – Papa John Creach on February 22, 1994, Skip Spence on April 16, 1999, Spencer Dryden on January 11, 2005, Joey Covington on June 4, 2013, Signe Toly Anderson and Paul Kantner on January 28, 2016, and Marty Balin on September 27, 2018. On May 8, 2024, drummer John Barbata died.

== Members ==
Image	Name	Years active	Instruments	Release contributions
	Jorma Kaukonen	1965–1972; 1989; 1996	lead guitar; vocals	all Jefferson Airplane releases
	Paul Kantner	1965–1972; 1989; 1996 (died 2016)	rhythm guitar; vocals	all Jefferson Airplane releases
	Marty Balin	1965–1971; 1989; 1996 (died 2018)	vocals; rhythm guitar; occasional bass	all Jefferson Airplane releases, except Bark (1971), Long John Silver (1972) and Thirty Seconds Over Winterland (1973)
	Signe Toly Anderson	1965–1966 (died 2016)	vocals; percussion	Jefferson Airplane Takes Off (1966); Early Flight (1974)
	Bob Harvey	1965 (died 2025)	double bass	none
	Jerry Peloquin	1965 (died 2022)	drums	none
	Skip Spence	1965–1966 (died 1999)	drums; percussion	Jefferson Airplane Takes Off (1966); Surrealistic Pillow (1967); Early Flight (1974)
	Jack Casady	1965–1972; 1989; 1996	bass; occasional guitar	all Jefferson Airplane releases
	Grace Slick	1966–1972; 1989	vocals; keyboards; piano; recorder; percussion	all Jefferson Airplane releases, except Jefferson Airplane Takes Off (1965)
	Spencer Dryden	1966–1970; 1996 (died 2005)	drums; percussion	all Jefferson Airplane releases from Surrealistic Pillow (1967) to Volunteers (1969); Early Flight (1974)
	Joey Covington	1970–1972 (died 2013)	drums; percussion; backing and occasional lead vocals	Volunteers (1969); Bark (1971); Long John Silver (1972)
	Papa John Creach	1970–1972 (died 1994)	violin; vocals	Bark (1971); Long John Silver (1972); Thirty Seconds Over Winterland (1973)
	John Barbata	1972 (died 2024)	drums; percussion	Long John Silver (1972); Thirty Seconds Over Winterland (1973)
	David Freiberg	1972	vocals; rhythm guitar	Thirty Seconds Over Winterland (1973)
	Kenny Aronoff	1989 (session and touring)	drums; percussion	Jefferson Airplane (1989)
	Peter Kaukonen	1989 (session and touring)	rhythm guitar	Jefferson Airplane (1989)
	Tim Gorman (died 2025)	1989 (touring)	keyboards	none
	Randy Jackson	1989 (touring)	rhythm guitar; keyboards	none

== Timelines ==
=== Recordings ===
Album	Vocals, guitar	Vocals	Lead guitar	Rhythm guitar	Bass	Keyboards	Drums	Violin
Jefferson Airplane Takes Off (1966)	Marty Balin	Signe Toly Anderson	Jorma Kaukonen	Paul Kantner	Jack Casady	none	Skip Spence; Spencer Dryden	none
Surrealistic Pillow (1967)	Marty Balin	Grace Slick	Jorma Kaukonen	Paul Kantner	Jack Casady	Grace Slick	Spencer Dryden	none
After Bathing at Baxter's (1967)	Marty Balin	Grace Slick	Jorma Kaukonen	Paul Kantner	Jack Casady	Grace Slick	Spencer Dryden	none
Crown of Creation (1968)	Marty Balin	Grace Slick	Jorma Kaukonen	Paul Kantner	Jack Casady	Grace Slick	Spencer Dryden	none
Volunteers (1969)	Marty Balin	Grace Slick	Jorma Kaukonen	Paul Kantner	Jack Casady	Grace Slick	Spencer Dryden	none
Bark (1971)	none	Grace Slick	Jorma Kaukonen	Paul Kantner	Jack Casady	Grace Slick	Joey Covington	Papa John Creach
Long John Silver (1972)	none	Grace Slick	Jorma Kaukonen	Paul Kantner	Jack Casady	Grace Slick	Joey Covington; John Barbata	Papa John Creach
Jefferson Airplane (1989)	Marty Balin	Grace Slick	Jorma Kaukonen	Paul Kantner	Jack Casady	Grace Slick	Kenny Aronoff (session member)	none

== Lineups ==
Period	Members	Releases
Summer 1965	Signe Toly Anderson – vocals, percussion; Marty Balin – vocals, rhythm guitar; Jorma Kaukonen – lead guitar, vocals; Paul Kantner – rhythm guitar, vocals; Bob Harvey – double bass; Jerry Peloquin – drums	none – live performances only
August – October 1965	Signe Toly Anderson – vocals, percussion; Marty Balin – vocals, rhythm guitar; Jorma Kaukonen – lead guitar, vocals; Paul Kantner – rhythm guitar, vocals; Bob Harvey – double bass; Skip Spence – drums	none – live performances only
October 1965 – May 1966	Signe Toly Anderson – vocals, percussion; Marty Balin – vocals, rhythm guitar; Jorma Kaukonen – lead guitar, vocals; Paul Kantner – rhythm guitar, vocals; Jack Casady – bass; Skip Spence – drums	Jefferson Airplane Takes Off (1966)
May – October 1966	Signe Toly Anderson – vocals, percussion; Marty Balin – vocals, rhythm guitar; Jorma Kaukonen – lead guitar, vocals; Paul Kantner – rhythm guitar, vocals; Jack Casady – bass; Spencer Dryden – drums, percussion	Jefferson Airplane Takes Off (1966) – two tracks
October 1966 – February 1970	Grace Slick – vocals, keyboards; Marty Balin – vocals, rhythm guitar; Jorma Kaukonen – lead guitar, vocals; Paul Kantner – rhythm guitar, vocals; Jack Casady – bass; Spencer Dryden – drums, percussion	Surrealistic Pillow (1967); After Bathing at Baxter's (1967); Crown of Creation (1968); Bless Its Pointed Little Head (1969); Volunteers (1969)
February – October 1970	Grace Slick – vocals, keyboards; Marty Balin – vocals, rhythm guitar; Jorma Kaukonen – lead guitar, vocals; Paul Kantner – rhythm guitar, vocals; Jack Casady – bass; Joey Covington – drums, percussion	none – live performances only
October 1970 – April 1971	Grace Slick – vocals, keyboards; Marty Balin – vocals, rhythm guitar; Jorma Kaukonen – lead guitar, vocals; Paul Kantner – rhythm guitar, vocals; Jack Casady – bass; Joey Covington – drums, percussion; Papa John Creach – violin, vocals	none – live performances only
April 1971 – March 1972	Grace Slick – vocals, keyboards; Jorma Kaukonen – lead guitar, vocals; Paul Kantner – rhythm guitar, vocals; Jack Casady – bass; Joey Covington – drums, percussion; Papa John Creach – violin, vocals	Bark (1971); Long John Silver (1972) – two tracks
March – July 1972	Grace Slick – vocals, keyboards; Jorma Kaukonen – lead guitar, vocals; Paul Kantner – rhythm guitar, vocals; Jack Casady – bass; John Barbata – drums, percussion; Papa John Creach – violin, vocals	Long John Silver (1972)
July – September 1972	Grace Slick – vocals, keyboards; David Freiberg – vocals, rhythm guitar; Jorma Kaukonen – lead guitar, vocals; Paul Kantner – rhythm guitar, vocals; Jack Casady – bass; John Barbata – drums, percussion; Papa John Creach – violin, vocals	Thirty Seconds Over Winterland (1973)
Band inactive 1972–1989
1989	Grace Slick – vocals, keyboards; Marty Balin – vocals, rhythm guitar; Jorma Kaukonen – lead guitar, vocals; Paul Kantner – rhythm guitar, vocals; Jack Casady – bass; Peter Kaukonen – rhythm guitar (session); Kenny Aronoff – drums (session)	Jefferson Airplane (1989)
1989	Grace Slick – vocals, keyboards; Marty Balin – vocals, rhythm guitar; Jorma Kaukonen – lead guitar, vocals; Paul Kantner – rhythm guitar, vocals; Jack Casady – bass; Peter Kaukonen – rhythm guitar (touring); Kenny Aronoff – drums (touring); Randy Jackson – rhythm guitar, keyboards (touring); Tim Gorman - keyboards (touring)	none – Jefferson Airplane tour only
Band inactive 1989–1996
January 17, 1996	Marty Balin – vocals; Jorma Kaukonen – lead guitar, vocals; Paul Kantner – rhythm guitar, vocals; Jack Casady – bass; Spencer Dryden – drums	none – Rock and Roll Hall of Fame performance only

== See also ==
- List of Jefferson Starship members
- List of Starship members
