= Jefferson Airplane Loves You =

Box set by Jefferson Airplane
- Released: October 27, 1992
- Recorded: 1962–1972
- Genre: Rock
- Label: RCA
- Producer: Paul Williams; Bill Thompson (exec.)

Jefferson Airplane chronology
Live at the Monterey Festival (1991)	Jefferson Airplane Loves You (1992)	Live at the Fillmore East (1998)

Disc 1 cover art

Disc 2 cover art

Disc 3 cover art

Professional ratings
Review scores
Source	Rating
Allmusic	3/5 stars
The Encyclopedia of Popular Music	3/5 stars

Jefferson Airplane Loves You is a three-CD boxed set of recordings by the San Francisco rock band Jefferson Airplane with extensive liner notes by Jeff Tamarkin, author of the Jefferson Airplane history Got a Revolution: The Turbulent Flight of Jefferson Airplane.

Many of the tracks are previously unreleased live recordings or studio rehearsals, but several are lifted from prior Jefferson Airplane albums. A song by The Great Society, Grace Slick's original band, appears on the first CD.

A Quadradisc quadraphonic version of the Volunteers album was released, and a few of the songs are from this release, but have been remixed into conventional stereo. Because of the remix, any psychedelic movements of instruments from front-to-back or side-to-side behind the listener that were present in the quadradisc version are lost. The Quadradisc album used the discrete CD-4 system jointly developed by JVC and RCA.

The songs are arranged in chronological order beginning with a pre-Airplane solo by Marty Balin and ending with a 1972 live recording of the rarely heard "You Wear Your Dresses Too Short".

== Track listing ==
=== Disc 1 ===
1. "I Specialize in Love" (Marty Balin, Harry Collis) – 1:56 (Marty Balin Challenge single #9156)
2. "Go To Her" (Paul Kantner, Irving Estes) – 4:05 (previously unreleased early version)
3. "Bringing Me Down" (Balin, Kantner) – 2:22 (from Jefferson Airplane Takes Off)
4. "Let Me In" (Balin, Kantner) – 3:28 (previously unreleased alternate take) (Note: mixed December, 1991 by Pat Ieraci and Mark Linett)
5. "Chauffeur Blues" (Lester Melrose) – 2:28 (from Jefferson Airplane Takes Off)
6. "Free Advice" (Darby Slick) – 2:29 (Great Society Northbeach single #1001)
7. "Somebody to Love" (D. Slick) – 2:58 (from Surrealistic Pillow)
8. "Today" (Balin, Kantner) – 3:00 (from Surrealistic Pillow)
9. "Embryonic Journey" (Jorma Kaukonen) – 1:52 (from Surrealistic Pillow)
10. "White Rabbit" (Grace Slick) – 2:33 (from Surrealistic Pillow)
11. "Come Back Baby" (traditional, arranged by Kaukonen) – 2:55 (previously unreleased) (Note: from an unreleased Jefferson Airplane compilation LP (LSP-3995) that was to include live and studio tracks in early 1968)
12. "The Other Side of This Life" (Fred Neil) – 8:03 (previously unreleased live) (Note: recorded at the Fillmore Auditorium in San Francisco, CA, May 1967) (Note: mixed June, 1992 by Paul Williams and Pat Martin)
13. "Runnin' 'Round this World" (Balin, Kantner) – 2:30 (previously unreleased live)
14. "She Has Funny Cars" (Kaukonen, Balin) – 3:37 (previously unreleased live)
15. "High Flyin' Bird" (Billy Edd Wheeler) – 4:03 (previously unreleased live)
16. "Tobacco Road" (John D. Loudermilk) – 3:57 (previously unreleased live)
17. "Let's Get Together" (Chet Powers) – 4:05 (previously unreleased live)
18. "White Rabbit" (G. Slick) – 2:23 (previously unreleased live)
19. "Comin' Back to Me" (Balin) – 7:38 (previously unreleased live)
20. "Won't You Try/Saturday Afternoon" (Kantner) – 7:01 (previously unreleased live)

=== Disc 2 ===
1. "The Ballad of You and Me and Pooneil" (Kantner) – 11:38 (previously unreleased alternate version)
2. "Things are Better in the East" (Balin) – 3:18 (previously unreleased)
3. "Watch Her Ride" (Kantner) – 3:15 (from After Bathing at Baxter's)
4. "Two Heads" (G. Slick) – 3:14 (from After Bathing at Baxter's)
5. "Martha" (Kantner) – 3:26 (single version) (RCA single #47-9389)
6. "Don't Let Me Down" (Balin, Ernie K-Doe) – 2:54 (previously unreleased)
7. "Crown of Creation" (Kantner) – 2:53 (from Crown of Creation)
8. "Lather" (G. Slick) – 2:57 (from Crown of Creation)
9. "In Time" (Kantner, Balin) – 4:14 (from Crown of Creation)
10. "House at Pooneil Corners" (Kantner, Balin) – 5:51 (from Crown of Creation)
11. "Ribump Ba Bap Dum Dum" (Spencer Dryden, Bill Goodwin) – 1:32 (previously unreleased) (Note: from the master tape for Crown of Creation)
12. "Would You Like a Snack?" (G. Slick, Frank Zappa) – 2:38 (previously unreleased)
13. "3/5 Mile in 10 Seconds" (Balin) – 4:45 (live) (from Bless Its Pointed Little Head)
14. "It's No Secret" (Balin) – 3:28 (live) (from Bless Its Pointed Little Head)
15. "Plastic Fantastic Lover" (Balin) – 4:24 (previously unreleased live) (Note: recorded at the Woodstock Festival at Bethel, NY, August 17, 1969)
16. "Uncle Sam Blues" (traditional, arranged by Kaukonen, Jack Casady) – 5:27 (previously unreleased live)
17. "Wooden Ships" (David Crosby, Kantner, Stephen Stills) – 5:52 (alternate take) (from Quadraphonic Volunteers) (Note: mixed down to stereo June, 1992 by Paul Williams and Pat Martin)
18. "Volunteers" (Balin, Kantner) – 2:17 (alternate take) (from Quadraphonic Volunteers)

=== Disc 3 ===
1. "We Can Be Together" (Kantner) – 6:00 (alternate take) (from Quadraphonic Volunteers)
2. "Turn My Life Down" (Kaukonen) – 2:56 (from Volunteers)
3. "Good Shepherd" (traditional, arranged by Kaukonen) – 4:24 (from Volunteers)
4. "Hey Fredrick" (G. Slick) – 9:04 (alternate take) (from Quadraphonic Volunteers)
5. "Emergency" (Balin) – 4:36 (from "Go Ride the Music" documentary)
6. "When the Earth Moves Again" (Kantner) – 3:55 (from Bark)
7. "Pretty as You Feel" (Casady, Joey Covington, Kaukonen) – 3:09 (single version) (Grunt single #65-0500)
8. "Law Man" (G. Slick) – 2:42 (from Bark)
9. "Feel So Good" (Kaukonen) – 9:23 (previously unreleased extended version) (Note: from the master tape for Bark)
10. "Twilight Double Leader" (Kantner) – 4:47 (from Long John Silver)
11. "Aerie (Gang of Eagles)" (G. Slick) – 3:55 (from Long John Silver)
12. "Trial by Fire" (Kaukonen) – 4:51 (live) (from Thirty Seconds Over Winterland)
13. "Dress Rap" (G. Slick) – 1:25 (previously unreleased live) (Note: recorded at Winterland in San Francisco, CA, September 22, 1972)
14. "You Wear Your Dresses Too Short" (Balin) – 12:35 (previously unreleased live)

== Personnel ==
=== Jefferson Airplane ===
- Marty Balin – vocals, rhythm guitar, percussion
- Grace Slick – vocals, piano, organ, recorder
- Paul Kantner – vocals, rhythm guitar
- Jorma Kaukonen – lead guitar, vocals
- Jack Casady – bass
- Spencer Dryden – drums, percussion
- Signe Anderson – vocals on "Go to Her", "Bringing Me Down", and "Chauffeur Blues"
- Skip Spence – drums on "Bringing Me Down", "Let Me In", and "Chauffeur Blues"
- Joey Covington – congas on "Turn My Life Down" and "Pretty as You Feel", drums on "Emergency", "When the Earth Moves Again", "Law Man", "Feel So Good", and "Twilight Double Leader", tambourine on "Twilight Double Leader", lead vocals on "Pretty as You Feel"
- Papa John Creach – electric violin on "When the Earth Moves Again", "Pretty as You Feel", "Twilight Double Leader", "Aerie", "Trial by Fire", and "You Wear Your Dresses Too Short"
- John Barbata – drums on "Aerie", "Trial by Fire", and "You Wear Your Dresses Too Short"
- David Freiberg – tambourine on "Trial by Fire"

=== Additional Personnel ===
- Jerry Garcia – guitar on "Today"
- Gary Blackman – nose solo on "Lather"
- Gene Twombly – sound effects on "Lather"
- Dan Woody – bongos on "Ribump Ba Bap Dum Dum"
- Bill Goodwin – drums on "Ribump Ba Bap Dum Dum"
- Tim Davis – congas on "Ribump Ba Bap Dum Dum"
- Nicky Hopkins – piano on "Plastic Fantastic Lover", "Uncle Sam Blues", "Wooden Ships, "Volunteers", "We Can Be Together", and "Hey Fredrick"
- Stephen Stills – Hammond organ on "Turn My Life Down"
- Ace of Cups – vocals on "Turn My Life Down"
- Carlos Santana – guitar on "Pretty as You Feel"
- Michael Shrieve – drums on "Pretty as You Feel"

=== Marty Balin single ===
- Marty Balin – vocals
- Red Callender – bass
- Barney Kessel – guitar
- Glen Campbell – guitar
- Milt Jackson – vibes
- The Blossoms – background vocals

=== Great Society single ===
- Grace Slick – vocals
- Darby Slick – lead guitar
- David Minor – vocals, rhythm guitar
- Bard Du Pont – bass
- Jerry Slick – drums
- Billy Preston – drum overdubs

=== Frank Zappa track ===
- Grace Slick – vocals, keyboards
- Frank Zappa – leader
- Arthur Tripp, III – drums, percussion
- Ian Underwood – piano, woodwinds
- Don Preston – keyboards
- Ruth Komanoff – xylophone

=== Production ===
- Paul Williams – compilation producer, project supervision, tape research
- Bill Thompson – executive producer, repertoire selection
- Bruce Scavuzzo – project supervision, repertoire selection
- Frankie Pezzella – project coordinator
- David Cohen – repertoire selection, creative consultant, tape research
- Pat Ieraci (Maurice) – creative consultant, tape research, vault research
- Jeff Tamarkin – creative consultant, essay
- Bill Lacey – digital remastering, audio restoration
- Dick Baxter – transfer from analog masters
- James Agren – tape research
- Bruce Hailstalk, Mike Henney, Roger Fish – vault research
- Ria Lewerke – creative director
- DesignArt, Inc, (Norman Moore, Chris Moore) – art direction, design, book layout
- Mike Frankel, Herb Greene, Jim Marshall – photography
- Jim Smircich – RCA label archives
