= The Roar of Jefferson Airplane =

Compilation album by Jefferson Airplane
- Released: 2001
- Genre: Folk rock, psychedelic rock
- Label: RCA

Jefferson Airplane chronology
Through the Looking Glass (1999)	The Roar of Jefferson Airplane (2001)	Platinum & Gold Collection (2003)

Professional ratings
Review scores
Source	Rating
Allmusic	4/5 stars

The Roar of Jefferson Airplane is a compilation of songs by San Francisco rock band Jefferson Airplane.

== Track listing ==
1. "It's No Secret" – 2:38
2. "Go to Her" – 4:00
3. "Greasy Heart" – 3:25
4. "The Ballad of You and Me and Pooneil" – 4:29
5. "The House at Pooneil Corners" – 5:51
6. "Plastic Fantastic Lover" – 2:37
7. "Somebody to Love" – 2:57
8. "3/5 of a Mile in 10 Seconds" (live) – 4:50
9. "Long John Silver" – 4:22
10. "Feel So Good" – 4:36
11. "The Last Wall of the Castle" – 2:44
12. "Eat Starch Mom" – 4:34
13. "Volunteers" – 2:02
14. "The Other Side of This Life" (live) – 5:13

== Personnel ==
- Grace Slick – vocals, piano
- Marty Balin – vocals, percussion
- Paul Kantner – rhythm guitar, vocals
- Jorma Kaukonen – lead guitar, vocals
- Jack Casady – bass
- Spencer Dryden – drums, percussion
- Signe Toly Anderson – vocals on "It's No Secret" and "Go to Her"
- Skip Spence – drums on "It's No Secret" and "Go to Her"
- Joey Covington – drums on "Feel So Good"
- John Barbata – drums on "Long John Silver" and "Eat Starch Mom"

Additional personnel

- Nicky Hopkins – piano on "Volunteers"
