= Platinum & Gold Collection (Jefferson Airplane album) =

The Platinum & Gold Collection

Greatest hits album by Jefferson Airplane
- Released: May 6, 2003
- Recorded: 1966–1969
- Genre: Psychedelic rock, folk rock
- Label: BMG/RCA
- Producer: Rob Santos; Gretchen Brennison

Professional ratings
Review scores
Source	Rating
Allmusic	3/5 stars

The Platinum & Gold Collection is part of Arista Records' Platinum & Gold Collection. Recorded between 1966 & 1969, this compilation serves as a primer for both the early years of Jefferson Airplane and the golden age of psychedelic rock. The songs were variously produced by Matthew Katz, Tommy Olive, Rick Jarrad, Al Schmitt, and Paul Kantner.

== Track listing ==
1. "It's No Secret" (Marty Balin) – 2:40 from Jefferson Airplane Takes Off (1966)
2. "Come Up the Years" (Balin, Paul Kantner) – 2:34 from Jefferson Airplane Takes Off
3. "My Best Friend" (Skip Spence) – 3:04 from Surrealistic Pillow (1967)
4. "Somebody to Love" (Darby Slick) – 3:00 from Surrealistic Pillow
5. "Comin' Back to Me" (Balin) – 5:23 from Surrealistic Pillow
6. "Embryonic Journey" (Jorma Kaukonen) – 1:55 from Surrealistic Pillow
7. "White Rabbit" (Grace Slick) – 2:34 from Surrealistic Pillow
8. "The Ballad of You and Me and Pooneil" (Kantner) – 4:34 from After Bathing at Baxter's (1967)
9. "Watch Her Ride" (Kantner) – 3:13 from After Bathing at Baxter's
10. "Crown of Creation" (Kantner) – 2:54 from Crown of Creation (1968)
11. "Greasy Heart" (Slick) – 3:27 from Crown of Creation
12. "Volunteers" (Balin, Kantner) – 2:04 from Volunteers (1969)

== Personnel ==
- Grace Slick – vocals; piano on "The Ballad of You and Me and Pooneil", "Greasy Heart" and "Volunteers"
- Marty Balin – vocals
- Paul Kantner – vocals, rhythm guitar
- Jorma Kaukonen – lead guitars, vocals
- Jack Casady – bass
- Spencer Dryden – drums, percussion
- Signe Toly Anderson – vocals on "It's No Secret" and "Come Up the Years"
- Skip Spence – drums on "It's No Secret" and "Come Up the Years"

Additional personnel

- Nicky Hopkins – piano on "Volunteers"
