= Cleared for Take Off =

Live album by Jefferson Airplane
- Released: November 6, 2003
- Recorded: 1966–1967
- Genre: Rock, psychedelic rock
- Length: 1:10:50
- Label: Acrobat (USA)

Jefferson Airplane chronology
Platinum & Gold Collection (2003)	Cleared for Take Off (2003)	The Essential Jefferson Airplane (2005)

Professional ratings
Review scores
Source	Rating
AllMusic	2/5 stars

Cleared for Take Off is an album of music from the San Francisco rock band Jefferson Airplane recorded live at Winterland in March 1967.

Much of the album features live versions of songs from the band's first two albums, Jefferson Airplane Takes Off and Surrealistic Pillow. Other tracks like "Don't Let Me Down" did not even appear on a Jefferson Airplane album. All of the tracks are live performances by the band.

== Track listing ==
1. "3/5 of a Mile in Ten Seconds" – 4:37
2. "Don't Let Me Down" – 2:53
3. "Don't Slip Away" – 2:32
4. "She Has Funny Cars" – 3:36
5. "Let's Get Together" – 5:31
6. "High Flyin' Bird" – 2:35
7. "It's No Secret" – 2:38
8. "Jorma's Blues" – 2:38
9. "Plastic Fantastic Lover" – 3:48
10. "Runnin' 'Round This World" – 3:11
11. "Somebody to Love" – 2:54
12. "The Other Side of This Life" – 5:12
13. "Thing" – 11:25
14. "Tobacco Road" – 3:27
15. "Today" – 3:01
16. "White Rabbit" – 2:29
17. "You're Bringing Me Down" – 2:41
18. "You're My Best Friend" – 3:20
