= Cleared for Take Off (disambiguation) =

Cleared for Take Off is a 2003 compilation album by Jefferson Airplane.

Cleared for Take Off may also refer to:

- Permission granted for takeoff, where an aerospace vehicle leaves the ground and becomes airborne
- Cleared for Take-Off, a 1996 memoire by Dirk Bogarde
- "Cleared for Take-off", a 1994 episode of Equinox
