= At Golden Gate Park =

Live album by Jefferson Airplane
- Released: October 23, 2006
- Recorded: May 7, 1969
- Genre: Rock, psychedelic rock, acid rock
- Length: 70:41
- Label: Charly

Jefferson Airplane chronology
Live at the Fillmore East (1998)	At Golden Gate Park (2006)	Last Flight (2007)

Professional ratings
Review scores
Source	Rating
AllMusic	2/5 stars

At Golden Gate Park is an authorized release in the United Kingdom of a recording of the concert given on May 7, 1969, by the San Francisco, psychedelic rock band Jefferson Airplane at Golden Gate Park in San Francisco.

The concert was popularly bootlegged several times and this is the first time it has been officially released. The concert itself was prominent for Jefferson Airplane filled the bill with contemporary band, the Grateful Dead. It also includes tracks from their album Volunteers before that album had been released in November 1969. Included are three bonus tracks that were not a part of the concert. The CD artwork wrongly lists track 13 as 'Mexico' (Slick) instead of '3/5 of A Mile in 10 Seconds'.

== Track listing ==
1. "The Other Side of This Life" (Fred Neil) – 6:37
2. "Somebody to Love" (Darby Slick) – 4:17
3. "The Farm" (Paul Kantner, Gary Blackman) – 3:20
4. "Greasy Heart" (Grace Slick) – 3:44
5. "Good Shepherd" (traditional, arranged by Jorma Kaukonen) – 5:35
6. "Plastic Fantastic Lover" (Marty Balin) – 3:45
7. "Uncle Sam Blues" (traditional, arranged by Kaukonen, Jack Casady) – 8:38
8. "Volunteers" (Balin, Kantner) – 4:23
9. "White Rabbit" (Slick) – 2:27
10. "Won't You Try/Saturday Afternoon" (Kantner) – 5:09
11. "Jam" (Kantner, Kaukonen, Casady, Dryden) – 10:09 (bonus track)
12. "We Can Be Together" (Kantner) – 6:57 (bonus track)
13. "3/5 of a Mile in 10 Seconds" (Balin) – 5:40 (bonus track)

== Personnel ==
- Marty Balin – vocals
- Grace Slick – vocals
- Paul Kantner – vocals, rhythm guitar
- Jorma Kaukonen – lead guitar, vocals
- Jack Casady – bass
- Spencer Dryden – drums, percussion
