= Live at the Monterey Festival =

Live album by Jefferson Airplane
- Released: 1991
- Recorded: June 17, 1967
- Venue: Monterey County Fairgrounds, Monterey, California
- Genre: Psychedelic rock
- Length: 37:58
- Label: Thunderbolt

Jefferson Airplane UK Releases chronology
Jefferson Airplane (1989)	Live at the Monterey Festival (1991)	Jefferson Airplane Loves You (1992)

Live at the Monterey Festival is a live album by the San Francisco rock band Jefferson Airplane, which was released in the United Kingdom and Europe by Thunderbolt Records in 1991. The album was authorized by the band and features the entire set from the group's June 17, 1967, performance at the Monterey Pop Festival. The album marked the first time that Jefferson Airplane's entire Monterey Pop Festival performance had been given a release by a legitimate record company.

== Track listing ==
1. "Somebody to Love" (Darby Slick) – 3:16
2. "The Other Side of This Life" (Fred Neil) – 6:53
3. "White Rabbit" (Grace Slick) – 2:41
4. "High Flying Bird" (Billy Edd Wheeler) – 4:02
5. "Today" (Marty Balin, Paul Kantner) – 3:07
6. "She Has Funny Cars" (Jorma Kaukonen, Balin) – 3:20
7. "Young Girl Sunday Blues" (Balin) – 3:26
8. "The Ballad of You & Me & Pooneil" (Kantner) – 11:13

== Personnel ==
Jefferson Airplane

- Marty Balin – vocals
- Grace Slick – vocals, piano
- Paul Kantner – rhythm guitar, vocals
- Jorma Kaukonen – lead guitar
- Jack Casady – bass
- Spencer Dryden – drums, percussion
