= Live at the Fillmore East (Jefferson Airplane album) =

Live album by Jefferson Airplane
- Released: April 28, 1998
- Recorded: May 3–4, 1968
- Venue: Fillmore East, New York City
- Genre: Psychedelic rock, blues rock
- Length: 75:52
- Label: RCA
- Producer: Paul Williams

Jefferson Airplane chronology
Jefferson Airplane Loves You (1992)	Live at the Fillmore East (1998)	At Golden Gate Park (2006)

Professional ratings
Review scores
Source	Rating
Allmusic	4/5 stars
The Encyclopedia of Popular Music	3/5 stars

Live at the Fillmore East is an album by the rock band Jefferson Airplane. It was recorded on May 3 and 4, 1968, at the Fillmore East in New York City. It was released on April 28, 1998. It is not to be confused with the similarly named Jefferson Airplane album Sweeping Up the Spotlight: Live at the Fillmore East 1969.

The song "Thing" is an experimental freeform instrumental that later morphed into "Bear Melt", which appears on Bless Its Pointed Little Head.

== Track listing ==
No.	Title	Writer(s)	Length
1.	"Intro / The Ballad of You and Me and Pooneil"	Paul Kantner	8:35
2.	"She Has Funny Cars"	Jorma Kaukonen, Marty Balin	3:56
3.	"It's No Secret"	Balin	3:41
4.	"Won't You Try / Saturday Afternoon"	Kantner	5:07
5.	"Greasy Heart"	Grace Slick	4:05
6.	"Star Track"	Kaukonen	7:36
7.	"Wild Tyme"	Kantner	3:21
8.	"White Rabbit"	Slick	2:58
9.	"Thing"	Kantner, Kaukonen, Jack Casady, Spencer Dryden	11:28
10.	"Today"	Balin, Kantner	3:29
11.	"The Other Side of This Life"	Fred Neil	5:13
12.	"Fat Angel"	Donovan	9:04
13.	"Watch Her Ride"	Kantner	3:12
14.	"Closing Comments"		0:46
15.	"Somebody to Love"	Darby Slick	3:21

== Personnel ==
Jefferson Airplane

- Marty Balin - vocals, guitar, bass on "Fat Angel"
- Grace Slick - vocals, piano
- Jorma Kaukonen - lead guitar, vocals
- Paul Kantner - rhythm guitar, vocals
- Jack Casady - bass, rhythm guitar on "Fat Angel"
- Spencer Dryden - drums, percussion

Production

- Produced by Paul Williams
- Compiled by Bill Thompson, Paul Williams
- Recording: John Chester
- Mixing: Mike Hartry
- Audio restoration: Bill Lacey
- Essay: Jeff Tamarkin
