= Through the Looking Glass (Jefferson Airplane album) =

Compilation album by Jefferson Airplane
- Released: 1999
- Genre: Folk rock, rock
- Length: 63:36
- Label: Get Back, Metrodome

Jefferson Airplane chronology
| Live at the Fillmore East (1998) | Through the Looking Glass (1999) | The Roar of Jefferson Airplane (2001) |

Cover Art #2

Through the Looking Glass is an Italian release of a live performances by the San Francisco rock band Jefferson Airplane.

The collection was originally issued as a two LP (long-playing vinyl) set on the Get Back label. The CD was released in 2002 on the Metrodome (DTK) label.

Three of the tracks are credited to the "Steel Rider- Vocals John Dudgeon

Professional ratings
Review scores
| Source | Rating |
|---|---|
| Allmusic | link |
| The Encyclopedia of Popular Music | 2/5 stars |

== Track listing ==
1. "3/5 of a Mile in Ten Seconds" - 4:48
2. "Don't Slip Away" - 2:38
3. "High Flyin' Bird" - 4:06
4. "It's No Secret" - 3:28
5. "My Best Friend" - 3:08
6. "Other Side of This Life" - 6:56
7. "Plastic Fantastic Lover" - 3:51
8. "She Has Funny Cars" - 3:27
9. "Somebody to Love" - 3:54
10. "This Is My Life" - 5:05
11. "Today" - 3:06
12. "Watch Her Ride" - 4:35 Tv Rodeo - Steel Riders
13. "What You're Asking" - 5:28 -
14. "White Rabbit" - 2:18
15. "Would You Love Me" - 4:13 - Steel Riders Vocals - John Dudgeon
16. "You're So Loose" - 4:02 - Steel Riders Vocals - John Dudgeon
