= Last Flight (Jefferson Airplane album) =

Live album by Jefferson Airplane
- Released: February 2, 2007
- Recorded: September 22, 1972
- Genre: Psychedelic rock
- Label: Charly

Jefferson Airplane chronology
At Golden Gate Park (2006)	Last Flight (2007)	At the Family Dog Ballroom (2007)

Professional ratings
Review scores
Source	Rating
Allmusic	3/5 stars
The Encyclopedia of Popular Music	3/5 stars

Last Flight is an authorized recording released in the United Kingdom, taken from the last live performance of the San Francisco rock group Jefferson Airplane prior to the band's dissolution in 1972. The concert was held at the Winterland Arena in San Francisco, and selected tracks were released on the 1973 album Thirty Seconds Over Winterland. Last Flight consists of the entire concert with the exception of the encore, Marty Balin's "You Wear Your Dresses Too Short", previously released on the Jefferson Airplane Loves You box-set. Balin sings lead vocals on "Volunteers" much to the surprise of the audience since he left the band in late 1970.

== Track listing ==
1. Introduction by Bill Graham – 1:14
2. "Somebody to Love" (Darby Slick) – 4:39
3. "Twilight Double Leader" (Paul Kantner) – 4:30
4. "Wooden Ships" (David Crosby, Kantner, Stephen Stills) – 6:17
5. "Milk Train" (Grace Slick, Papa John Creach, Roger Spotts) – 4:09
6. "Blind John" (CJ Stetson, Peter Monk) – 4:27
7. "Come Back Baby" (traditional, arranged by Jorma Kaukonen) – 7:01
8. "The Son of Jesus" (Kantner) – 5:13
9. "Long John Silver" (Jack Casady, Slick) – 5:15
10. "When the Earth Moves Again" (Kantner) – 3:55
11. "Papa John's Down Home Blues" (Creach, Spotts) – 5:26
12. "Eat Starch Mom" (Kaukonen, Slick) – 5:35
13. "John's Other" (Creach) – 6:08
14. "Trial by Fire" (Kaukonen) – 4:24
15. "Law Man" (Slick) – 2:40
16. "Have You Seen the Saucers?" (Kantner) – 4:04
17. "Aerie (Gang of Eagles)" (Slick) – 3:30
18. "Feel So Good" (Kaukonen) – 11:00
19. "Crown of Creation" (Kantner) – 3:23
20. "Walking the Tou Tou" (Kaukonen) – 5:11
21. "Diana / Volunteers" (Kantner, Slick / Balin, Kantner) – 5:21

== Personnel ==
- Grace Slick – vocals
- Paul Kantner – vocals, rhythm guitar
- Jorma Kaukonen – lead guitar, vocals
- Jack Casady – bass
- John Barbata – drums, percussion
- Papa John Creach – electric violin, vocals on "Papa John's Down Home Blues"
- David Freiberg – vocals, tambourine, guitar on "Blind John"
- Marty Balin – vocals on "Volunteers"
