= Mexico (Jefferson Airplane song) =

Single by Jefferson Airplane
- B-side: "Have You Seen the Saucers?"
- Released: May 1970
- Recorded: February 1970
- Studio: Pacific High (San Francisco); Wally Heider Studios (San Francisco)
- Genre: Hard rock
- Label: RCA Victor
- Songwriter: Grace Slick
- Producer: Jefferson Airplane

Jefferson Airplane singles chronology
"Volunteers" (1969)	"Mexico" (1970)	"Pretty as You Feel" (1971)

"Mexico" is a single released in May 1970 by San Francisco rock band Jefferson Airplane, produced by the band at Pacific High Recording Studios with Phill Sawyer as the recording engineer. Written and sung by Grace Slick, it is a tuneful rant against then-President Richard Nixon and his anti-drug initiative, Operation Intercept, that he had implemented to curtail the flow of marijuana into the United States from Mexico. The song closes with an exhortation for the young to realize the power of their numbers, as shown by the gathering of "half a million people on the lawn" at Woodstock.

The song received little radio airplay, being banned in some states, but did reach #102 on the Billboard charts.

Five months after the release of "Mexico", President Nixon requested that songs relating to drug abuse not be broadcast.

Live versions of "Mexico" and its B-side, "Have You Seen the Saucers", were intended to be released on the next Airplane album; however, Marty Balin left the band before production of Bark was completed, forcing a change in some of the planned material. A live version of "Have You Seen the Saucers" appeared as the opening track of the live album Thirty Seconds Over Winterland; the two studio tracks were finally released on an album when the Early Flight compilation was released.

The version on the 2400 Fulton Street LP and CD is a completely different mix from that on the single.

== Personnel ==
Personnel from original vinyl credits.

- Grace Slick – piano, vocals
- Marty Balin – vocals
- Paul Kantner – rhythm guitar, vocals
- Jorma Kaukonen – lead guitar
- Jack Casady – bass
- Spencer Dryden – drums, percussion
- Joey Covington – congas and bells on "Have You Seen the Saucers"
