= Grace's Debut =

Live album by Jefferson Airplane
- Released: October 11, 2010
- Recorded: October 16, 1966, Filmore Auditorium, San Francisco, CA
- Genre: Folk rock; psychedelic rock
- Length: 1:10:31
- Label: Collector's Choice

Jefferson Airplane chronology
Signe's Farewell (2010)	Grace's Debut (2010)	We Have Ignition (2010)

Grace's Debut is a live album by the American psychedelic rock band Jefferson Airplane and released on Collector's Choice Records on October 11, 2010. The album features Grace Slick's first performance with the band after she replaced their former female-vocalist, Signe Toly Anderson. Arguably the turning point of Jefferson Airplane's career, the event leading to Slick's entry into the group was on the weekend of October 14–16, 1966 (Friday-Sunday), when the band played at the Filmore Auditorium on a triple bill, preceded by the Paul Butterfield Blues Band and followed by Big Mama Thornton for two shows a day. Anderson performed for the first two days, with the night concert on Saturday archived on the live album, Signe's Farewell.

== Track listing ==
1. "The Other Side of This Life" – 6:33
2. "Let's Get Together" – 4:20
3. "Let Me In" – 3:40
4. "Don't Let Me Down" – 4:59
5. "Run Around" – 4:04
6. "It's No Secret" – 3:57
7. "Tobacco Road" – 5:26
8. "Kansas City" – 7:23
9. "Bringing Me Down" – 3:29
10. "And I Like It" – 6:12
11. "High Flyin' Bird" – 4:10
12. "Thing" – 10:01
13. "3/5 of a Mile in 10 Seconds" – 6:17
