= Bark (Jefferson Airplane album) =

Studio album by Jefferson Airplane
- Released: September 1971
- Recorded: October 1970 – July 1971
- Studios: Wally Heider Studios, San Francisco
- Length: 44:17
- Label: Grunt/RCA
- Producer: Jefferson Airplane

Jefferson Airplane chronology
The Worst of Jefferson Airplane (1970)	Bark (1971)	Long John Silver (1972)

Alternative cover
- Cardboard sleeve that came with the original vinyl LP release (RCA Victor, 1971)

Bark is the sixth studio album by American rock band Jefferson Airplane. The album was the first without band founder Marty Balin (who departed the band during the recording process but without featuring in the album sessions proper) and the first with violinist Papa John Creach. Drummer Spencer Dryden had been replaced by Joey Covington in early 1970 after a lengthy transitional period in which both musicians had performed with the band.

Bark was the Airplane's first new album in two years, the previous being 1969's Volunteers. It was the first release on Grunt Records, launched in August 1971 by the band and RCA as an autonomous imprint for Jefferson Airplane-related releases.

Lead guitarist Jorma Kaukonen received four songwriting credits on the album, indicative of his growing importance as a composer and vocalist. At the time, he and bassist Jack Casady had already recorded two albums for their spin-off blues rock group Hot Tuna.

The album reached number 11 on the Billboard albums chart (outperforming both Volunteers and Kantner's Hugo Award-nominated 1970 solo album Blows Against the Empire) and was certified gold by RIAA. An accompanying single, the Covington-led "Pretty as You Feel", was the band's final top 100 American hit, peaking at number 60 in Billboard and number 35 in Cashbox.

== Recording history ==
Recording sessions for the album began in 1970 following the commercial failure of Grace Slick's "Mexico", a single that railed against the Nixon administration's anti-marijuana Operation Intercept initiative. Planned tracks included live versions of "Mexico" and its B-side, the Kantner-penned "Have You Seen the Saucers?"); Balin's "Emergency"; Balin-sung covers of Peter Kaukonen's "Up or Down" and Syl Johnson's "Dresses Too Short"; and Covington's "Whatever The Old Man Does (Is Always Right)" and "The Man (The Bludgeon of the Bluecoat)", a 1950s rhythm and blues pastiche inspired by the contemporaneous murder of journalist Rubén Salazar by a Los Angeles County Sheriff's Department deputy.

A tour of the United States in support of the band's first greatest hits album (The Worst of Jefferson Airplane) continued through the autumn of 1970, with Creach (a veteran jazz musician who appeared with Nat King Cole in Fritz Lang's The Blue Gardenia before meeting Covington at a hiring hall in the late 1960s) joining the band and Hot Tuna on the day of Janis Joplin's death. Balin did not perform at the band's following concert at Winterland Ballroom on October 5 in remembrance of his close friend but continued with the tour; nevertheless, he was growing increasingly frustrated with the band's drug use and "playing that messed up cocained music."

Jefferson Airplane stopped touring in November 1970 as Grace Slick and Paul Kantner were about to have a child. China Kantner was born on January 25, 1971. "Pretty as You Feel" (culled from a longer jam with members of Santana (Note: "Pretty as You Feel" began as a jam between Casady, Covington, Kaukonen, Santana and Shrieve. Covington later isolated a portion of the jam and wrote lyrics for it. Fong-Torres, Ben (November 12, 1970). "Grace Slick with Paul Kantner: The Rolling Stone Interview". Rolling Stone. Archived from the original on February 1, 2016.)) was recorded in January 1971, during Slick's convalescence, while Hot Tuna continued touring and recorded the live First Pull Up, Then Pull Down in March. Recording sessions resumed in the spring of 1971, but Balin—who had not spoken with his bandmates since the end of the 1970 tour—formally left the group in April.

Kantner later admitted that the band didn't really know what direction to go without Balin: "Without Marty there was no centrifugal force pulling all the parts together. Without that force it just went ... whew." Slick also commented on the effect of Balin's absence: "Paul's a harmony singer. David Freiberg can sing lead but he is more or less a harmony singer too. So, since there is not a powerful lead male vocal that affects the band." Although "The Man" was recorded with Little Richard on piano (much to the consternation of Casady, who felt that his presence was stylistically inappropriate) during this period, new songs were ultimately composed by Kantner, Slick, Kaukonen and Covington in lieu of retaining the 1970-era material. (Balin's songs were dropped because the band didn't want material that they couldn't perform live.) The recording sessions finally concluded at the beginning of July 1971, with the resulting album featuring the core five-member band augmented by Creach on three tracks. "Up or Down" and the studio versions of "Mexico" and "Have You Seen the Saucers?" were later released on the Early Flight compilation.

== Release and promotion ==
The band played several dates in August in support of the new album (including two concerts in the New York metropolitan area and a show apiece in Detroit and Philadelphia) but no tour was planned. Only one date (a private party for Grunt Records at San Francisco's Friends and Relations Hall) was played after the album's release in September.

As the album climbed the Billboard charts, the band had already moved on to separate albums for Grunt Records: Kantner and Slick recorded Sunfighter, their first joint album; Creach worked on his eponymous debut album; and Kaukonen, Casady and Creach finished the first Hot Tuna studio album, Burgers. With the exception of a couple of dates in early 1972, the band did not play together again until the recording sessions for Long John Silver in March 1972.

== Original vinyl LP release ==
The original vinyl LP release featured an outer paper bag with the "JA" logo as though it were bought in a grocery store with the "JA" emblem as an homage to the original A&P supermarket chain logo. The bag was wrapped around the record, which was also inside paper. Inside the bag itself was a cardboard cover for storing the record, that featured a fish with human false teeth wrapped in paper and tied with string. Also inside the bag was a lyrics sheet insert, colored as pink "butcher paper". The paper bag became the cover art for the CD releases, and the fish image appeared on the CD itself.

== Critical reaction ==
Professional ratings
Review scores
Source	Rating
AllMusic	3/5 stars
Christgau's Record Guide	C+
The Encyclopedia of Popular Music	3/5 stars
Rolling Stone	favorable

In The Rolling Stone Record Guide (1st edition, 1979), editor John Swenson wrote: "After Balin left, the group literally fell apart. A cursory listen to the wretched Bark … will prove the point."

Lester Bangs' original Rolling Stone review (Nov. 11, 1971) was much more favorable: "If you ask me, Bark is the 'Plane's most magnanimous opus since After Bathing at Baxter's, and even if its woof and whissshh ain't quite as supersonic as some of their other platters, it'll getcha there on time just like an amyl nitrite TV Dinner garnished this time with a little Valium. And the zingy rush that Jorma's and Jack's reps rest on streams as strongly as ever just a bit below the surface of the music with a motion seconded in places by the always judicious application of Papa John's sweet gypsy-blue fiddle."

== Track listing ==
Side A
No.	Title	Writer(s)	Length
1.	"When the Earth Moves Again"	Paul Kantner	3:54
2.	"Feel So Good"	Jorma Kaukonen	4:36
3.	"Crazy Miranda"	Grace Slick	3:23
4.	"Pretty as You Feel"	Joey Covington, Jack Casady, Kaukonen, Carlos Santana, Michael Shrieve	4:29
5.	"Wild Turkey" (instrumental)	Kaukonen	4:45

Side B
No.	Title	Writer(s)	Length
1.	"Law Man"	Slick	2:42
2.	"Rock and Roll Island"	Kantner	3:44
3.	"Third Week in the Chelsea"	Kaukonen	4:34
4.	"Never Argue with a German If You're Tired or European Song"	Slick	4:31
5.	"Thunk"	Covington	2:58
6.	"War Movie"	Kantner	4:41

== Personnel ==
- Jack Casady – bass guitar, bass balalaika
- Joey Covington – percussion, drums, vocals
- Paul Kantner – guitar, vocals
- Jorma Kaukonen – lead guitar, vocals
- Grace Slick – piano, vocals
- Papa John Creach – violin on "Pretty as You Feel", "Wild Turkey" and "When the Earth Moves Again"

=== Additional personnel ===
- Bill Laudner – vocals on "War Movie"
- Will Scarlett – harmonica on "Third Week in the Chelsea" (uncredited)
- Carlos Santana – guitar on "Pretty as You Feel" (uncredited)
- Michael Shrieve – drums on "Pretty as You Feel" (uncredited)

=== Production ===
- Jefferson Airplane – producer, arrangements, additional ideas
- A Train – additional ideas
- Allen Zentz – engineer
- Masterful Maurice (Pat Ieraci) – 16-track
- Acy Lehman – package concept and design
- Grace Slick – portraits
- Bill Thompson – portrait of Grace
- Gary Blackman – art direction, bag poem

== Charts ==
Chart (1971–1972)	Peak position
Australian Albums (Kent Music Report)	39
Canada Top Albums/CDs (RPM)	11
Japanese Albums (Oricon)	98
UK Albums (Official Charts)	42
US Billboard 200	11

== Certifications ==
Region	Certification	Certified units/sales
United States (RIAA)	Gold	500,000^{^}
^{^} Shipments figures based on certification alone.
