= Bless Its Pointed Little Head =

Live album by Jefferson Airplane
- Released: February 1969
- Venues: Fillmore West, San Francisco (24–26 October 1968); Fillmore East, New York City (28–30 November 1968)
- Genres: Psychedelic rock, acid rock, hard rock
- Length: 52:48
- Label: RCA Victor
- Producer: Al Schmitt

Jefferson Airplane chronology
| Crown of Creation (1968) | Bless Its Pointed Little Head (1969) | Volunteers (1969) |

Professional ratings
Review scores
| Source | Rating |
|---|---|
| AllMusic | 3/5 stars |
| Encyclopedia of Popular Music | 3/5 stars |
| The Music Box | 4/5 stars |
| The Rolling Stone Album Guide | 4/5 stars |

Bless Its Pointed Little Head is a live album by Jefferson Airplane recorded at both the Fillmore East and West in the fall of 1968 and released in 1969 as RCA Victor LSP-4133. The album reached #17 on the Billboard Top LP's chart in March 1969.

The tracks were recorded during the tour supporting Crown of Creation, although no songs from that album or its predecessor After Bathing at Baxter's were included (however, the CD rerelease contains bonus tracks of several selections from After Bathing at Baxter's). Selections were taken from the band's first two albums and a number of covers that had been in their setlist since 1965-66 but not recorded in the studio. One of these, "Fat Angel", had been written by Donovan in the spring of 1966 and namechecked the band, who were unknown outside the Bay Area at the time; for Jefferson Airplane's version, Marty Balin played bass, allowing Jack Casady to switch to guitar. Fred Neil's "The Other Side of This Life" is believed to have been in the setlist from Jefferson Airplane's first performance at The Matrix in August 1965. Jorma Kaukonen showcased his blues roots with a slow, heavy cover of the traditional "Rock Me Baby", a song that had been played by the band as early as 1966. Of the remaining selections, "Clergy" was an audio excerpt from the film King Kong that was used to introduce the band at their Fillmore shows, while "Turn Out the Lights" was a short, improvised number instructing the lighting crew to do its title's bidding. The closing "Bear Melt" had developed from a lengthy instrumental jam titled "Thing" that had evolved on stage through the years, now featuring an improvised vocal intro by Grace Slick. A version of "Thing" without Slick's vocal contribution can be heard on the archival release Live at the Fillmore East, taken from the group's May 1968 shows at the venue.

Many of Jefferson Airplane's recordings on the live album were longer than their studio performances, featuring greater use of improvisation, and most were played at a considerably higher speed. The performance emphasized the band's freewheeling, ping-pong vocal harmonies and revealed a harder-rocking group. Guitar and bass lines were deeper in their construction, forming complex instrumentals. Some of the band's hit singles, such as "White Rabbit", were not included, although a dramatically rearranged "Somebody to Love" appears. The album revealed a different focus in the sound of the band's live concerts compared to that of their studio work.

Bless Its Pointed Little Head received mixed reviews upon release although in the booklet to the box set Jefferson Airplane Loves You, it is noted as the only Jefferson Airplane album that all of the band members remembered with superlatives. "Plastic Fantastic Lover", which had become considerably funky compared to the studio recording, was released as a single in May 1969; while it failed to chart, it received positive reviews. Billboard described the single as "heavy hard rock" while Cash Box wrote that it "features the team's more commercial-than-controversial style" and has "a solid instrumental track and very fine vocal." Record World wrote that the song was one of the band's favorites.

== Track listing ==
Side one
| No. | Title | Writer(s) | Length |
|---|---|---|---|
| 1. | "Clergy" (recorded November 28–30 at Fillmore East) | Jefferson Airplane | 1:37 |
| 2. | "3/5 of a Mile in 10 Seconds" (recorded October 24–26 at Fillmore West) | Marty Balin | 4:39 |
| 3. | "Somebody to Love" (recorded October 24–26 at Fillmore West) | Darby Slick | 4:15 |
| 4. | "Fat Angel" (recorded November 28–30 at Fillmore East) | Donovan Leitch | 7:36 |
| 5. | "Rock Me Baby" (recorded October 24–26 at Fillmore West) | Traditional; arranged by Jefferson Airplane | 7:45 |

Side two
| No. | Title | Writer(s) | Length |
|---|---|---|---|
| 1. | "The Other Side of This Life" (recorded October 24–26 at Fillmore West) | Fred Neil | 6:48 |
| 2. | "It's No Secret" (recorded October 24–26 at Fillmore West) | Balin | 3:31 |
| 3. | "Plastic Fantastic Lover" (recorded October 24–26 at Fillmore West) | Balin | 3:53 |
| 4. | "Turn Out the Lights" (recorded November 28–30 at Fillmore East) | Paul Kantner, Jack Casady, Jorma Kaukonen, Grace Slick, Spencer Dryden | 1:24 |
| 5. | "Bear Melt" (recorded November 28–30 at Fillmore East) | Kantner, Casady, Kaukonen, G. Slick, Dryden | 11:22 |

CD remaster bonus tracks
| No. | Title | Writer(s) | Length |
|---|---|---|---|
| 11. | "Today" (recorded November 5 at Fillmore West) | Balin, Kantner | 3:50 |
| 12. | "Watch Her Ride" (recorded November 5 at Fillmore West) | Kantner | 3:19 |
| 13. | "Won't You Try / Saturday Afternoon" (recorded November 5 at Fillmore West) | Kantner | 5:30 |

On the back cover of the LP (RCA LSP-4133), "3/5 of a Mile in 10 Seconds" is identified as "3/5's Of a Mile in 10 Seconds".

"Clergy" contains an extract from the soundtrack of the 1933 film King Kong.

== Personnel ==
Jefferson Airplane

- Marty Balin – vocals. Bass on "Fat Angel"
- Jack Casady – bass. Rhythm guitar on "Fat Angel"
- Spencer Dryden – drums.
- Paul Kantner – vocals, rhythm guitar. Second lead guitar on "Fat Angel"
- Jorma Kaukonen – lead guitar, vocals
- Grace Slick – vocals, electric piano

Production

- Al Schmitt – producer
- Rich Schmitt – engineer
- Pat Ieraci – beret
- Jim Smircich – cover photography
- Bill Thompson – poster
- Gary Blackman – art direction

== Charts ==
| Chart (1969) | Peak position |
|---|---|
| Canada Top Albums/CDs (RPM) | 12 |
| UK Albums (Official Charts) | 38 |
| US Billboard 200 | 17 |

== General references ==
- Bless Its Pointed Little Head (Vinyl back cover). Jefferson Airplane. New York City: RCA. 1969. LSP-4133.
