= Long John Silver (album) =

Studio album by Jefferson Airplane
- Released: July 20, 1972
- Recorded: March – May 1972
- Studios: Wally Heider Studios, San Francisco
- Genre: Psychedelic rock
- Length: 41:25
- Label: Grunt/RCA
- Producer: Jefferson Airplane

Jefferson Airplane chronology
Bark (1971)	Long John Silver (1972)	Thirty Seconds Over Winterland (1973)

Alternative cover
- Paper sleeve that came with the original vinyl LP release

Long John Silver is the seventh studio album by the American rock band Jefferson Airplane, and their last album of all new material until 1989. It was recorded and released in 1972 by Grunt Records, and distributed by RCA Records.

== Recording history ==
After several solo projects for Grunt Records, the members of Jefferson Airplane (Paul Kantner, Grace Slick, Jorma Kaukonen, Jack Casady, Joey Covington and Papa John Creach) came together again in March 1972 for the first time in the studio since the Bark album was released in September 1971. Sessions at Wally Heider Studios continued for nearly three months, but tensions were high and several songs were recorded by each member recording their own part separately. David Crosby participated in the recording sessions, but his vocals were stripped from the record at the insistence of his label.

Joey Covington left the band during the sessions, with accounts varying over whether he was fired. Veteran session drummer John Barbata, formerly of The Turtles, and Hot Tuna's Sammy Piazza deputized for the rest of the recording process. Barbata ultimately replaced Covington, playing on all but three songs.

Recording was completed in May, 1972. Before the album's scheduled July release, RCA Records demanded that the band remove a line from the song "The Son of Jesus" electronically, which referred to a "bastard son of Jesus". Live performances of the song left the line intact.

== Release and promotion ==
Released on the band's Grunt Records imprint, the album reached No. 20 on the Billboard album chart, which was Jefferson Airplane's least successful effort since their 1966 debut.

In July, the band began a two-month tour of the United States, their first major tour since 1970. It featured a new line-up: Kantner, Slick, Kaukonen, Casady, Creach, Barbata and former Quicksilver Messenger Service bassist David Freiberg as an additional vocalist/percussionist. A close friend of Kantner from the early 1960s American folk music revival scene, Freiberg took over Marty Balin's harmony parts and selected leads on ensemble efforts (most notably "Wooden Ships") and "tried to keep the band together." The tour ended in September at San Francisco's Winterland Ballroom, with Balin joining for an encore. Live performances from the Chicago Auditorium Theatre and Winterland were released on the live album Thirty Seconds Over Winterland in 1973.

The original vinyl LP release (1972) featured an album cover that folded up into a stash box. The record sleeve bore an image of cigars; this image was later used as cover art on CD releases. The inside bottom of the box was covered with a photograph of marijuana.

== Reception ==
Professional ratings
Review scores
Source	Rating
AllMusic	3.5/5 stars
Christgau's Record Guide	C+
The Encyclopedia of Popular Music	3/5 stars
Rolling Stone	(not rated)

== Track listing ==
All lyrics are written by Grace Slick, except where noted.

Side one
No.	Title	Lyrics	Music	Length
1.	"Long John Silver"		Jack Casady	4:22
2.	"Aerie (Gang of Eagles)"		Slick	3:53
3.	"Twilight Double Leader"	Paul Kantner	Kantner	4:42
4.	"Milk Train"		Papa John Creach, Roger Spotts	3:18
5.	"The Son of Jesus"	Kantner	Kantner	5:27

Side two
No.	Title	Lyrics	Music	Length
1.	"Easter?"		Slick	4:00
2.	"Trial by Fire"	Jorma Kaukonen	Kaukonen	4:31
3.	"Alexander the Medium"	Kantner	Kantner	6:38
4.	"Eat Starch Mom"		Kaukonen	4:34

== Personnel ==
Jefferson Airplane

- Grace Slick – vocals, piano
- Jack Casady – bass
- Paul Kantner – vocals, rhythm guitar
- Jorma Kaukonen – lead guitar, vocals
- Papa John Creach – electric violin
- John Barbata – drums, tambourine, "against the grain stubble scraping"
- Joey Covington – drums on "Twilight Double Leader" and "The Son of Jesus"

Additional personnel

- Sammy Piazza – drums on "Trial by Fire"

=== Production ===
- Jefferson Airplane – producer, arrangements
- Pat "Maurice the Magnificent" Ieraci – production coordinator
- Don Gooch – engineer
- Steve Barncard – special thanks
- Pacific Eye & Ear – album concept, album design
- Bob Tanenbaum, Propella Rotini – illustrations
- Bruce Kinch – photography
- Borris – weed. AKA Mike Trudnich
- Recorded at the Wally Heider Studios, San Francisco

== Charts ==
Chart (1972)	Peak position
Canada Top Albums/CDs (RPM)	16
Japanese Albums (Oricon)	82
UK Albums (Official Charts)	30
US Billboard 200	20

== Certifications ==
Region	Certification	Certified units/sales
United States (RIAA)	Gold	500,000^{^}
^{^} Shipments figures based on certification alone.
