= Volunteers (Jefferson Airplane album) =

Studio album by Jefferson Airplane
- Released: November 1969
- Recorded: March 28–June 12, 1969
- Studio: Wally Heider (San Francisco)
- Genre: Psychedelic rock
- Length: 44:19
- Label: RCA Victor
- Producer: Al Schmitt

Jefferson Airplane chronology
Bless Its Pointed Little Head (1969)	Volunteers (1969)	The Worst of Jefferson Airplane (1970)

Volunteers is the fifth studio album by American psychedelic rock band Jefferson Airplane, released in 1969 on RCA Records. The album was controversial because of its revolutionary and anti-war lyrics, along with the use of profanity.

This was the last album with the group for both founder Marty Balin and drummer Spencer Dryden (although they did both appear on the June 1970 single "Mexico" and its B-side "Have You Seen the Saucers?"), signifying the end of the "classic" lineup. It also turned out to be the group's last all-new LP for two years as Jack Casady and Jorma Kaukonen devoted more of their energy to their embryonic blues group Hot Tuna, while Paul Kantner and Grace Slick released Blows Against the Empire and Sunfighter with various guest musicians and celebrated the birth of their daughter China in January 1971.

== Background ==
Jefferson Airplane took a break from all touring and recording activity in the first three months of 1969, to allow Grace Slick to have surgery to remove nodes in her throat. It was at this time that she began to break up with boyfriend Spencer Dryden in favor of the group's rhythm guitarist Paul Kantner; meanwhile, Casady and Kaukonen began performing as an unnamed duo in various clubs, a project which would eventually evolve into Hot Tuna. The live album Bless Its Pointed Little Head was released in February and performed moderately well, charting at No. 17 on Billboard. After over a month of intensive rehearsals at the group's home studio at 2400 Fulton (known as "the big house"), they resumed recording at the end of March with live shows following at the end of April, including several new songs in the set list they had just laid down in the studio.

== Songs and recording ==
Volunteers was the group's first album recorded entirely in San Francisco, at Wally Heider's newly opened state-of-the-art 16-track studio. The album was among the earliest 16-track recordings, with the back cover displaying a picture of the Ampex MM-1000 professional tape recorder used to record the album. Guest musicians included Jerry Garcia on pedal steel guitar, veteran session pianist Nicky Hopkins, future Airplane drummer Joey Covington on percussion, David Crosby and Stephen Stills. Sessions commenced on March 28 with backing tracks for Kantner's "We Can Be Together" and Slick's "Hey Fredrick" and continued until June 30 with the taping of Kaukonen's "Turn My Life Down", which featured Balin on lead and The Ace of Cups on backing vocals. The sessions were held late at night, with Heider's assistant Ginger Muse noting that "they'd start drifting in around six in the evening when I was leaving, and they'd still be there when I came in at nine the next morning", with the janitor often having to vacuum around Grace sleeping on the studio couch.

The album was marked by strong anti-war and pro-anarchism messages, particularly in the opening "We Can Be Together" (with provocative lines like "we are obscene, lawless, hideous, dangerous, dirty, violent...and young") and the joint Crosby/Kantner/Stills composition "Wooden Ships" which describes the struggle for survival in the aftermath of a nuclear war. The title track was inspired by a Volunteers of America (a religious charity similar to the Salvation Army) truck that woke singer Marty Balin one morning, which he and Kantner repurposed into a revolutionary anthem using the same strident riff as "We Can Be Together". Gentler hippie themes of nature, communities and ecology are explored in Kantner's "The Farm" and Slick's "Eskimo Blue Day", while "Hey Fredrick" mixes blatantly sexual imagery with what Grace called an admission that "I'm flying so high that I know I'm going to burn my wings on the sun if I don't slow down". Meanwhile, Dryden's "A Song for All Seasons" mocked contentious relations within the group, including a swipe at original manager Matthew Katz who it describes "skipped town with all your pay."

The album provoked controversy with record label RCA over the use of profanity in lyrics such as "Up against the wall, motherfucker," which appears in "We Can Be Together". RCA Records had initially refused to allow the word "fuck" on the album until confronted with the fact that the label had already set a precedent by using it in the Hair cast recording album. The offending word was mixed lower on the 45 RPM release to partially obscure it, but was censored on the album lyric sheet as "fred". "Eskimo Blue Day" was also a point of contention with RCA, with its chorus line "the human name doesn't mean shit to a tree" repeated throughout, but the offending profanity (like that in "We Can Be Together") was kept in the album intact.

== Title and artwork ==
The original album title was Volunteers of Amerika but was shortened after objections from Volunteers of America, the religious charity who had inspired the name. The front cover art featured a shot of the band in costume for the filming of a promotional video for "Martha" in October 1967, which was aired on the Perry Como Holiday Special later that year. The gatefold displayed two halves of a peanut butter and jelly sandwich, while original copies also included an 11"x22" folded paper insert with lyrics, credits, and info on one side and a mock newspaper titled "Paz Progress" on the other side.

== Release ==
The album was set for an August 1969 release but delayed until November over fights with RCA regarding the lyrics and album artwork. Despite these controversies, the album was a commercial success. It peaked at No. 13 (becoming the band's fifth Top 20 record) on the Billboard album chart and received an RIAA gold certification within two months of its release. It also became the band's first album to chart in the UK, peaking at No. 34.

In addition to the usual two channel stereo version, a specially remixed four channel quadraphonic version of the album appeared in 1973. This was released on LP using the Quadradisc system. It was also released in quad reel-to-reel and 8-track tape tape formats. The quad mixes are different from stereo: "Hey Fredrick" features a different lead vocal along with different guitar lines and coda, "Volunteers" is a totally different recording, Kaukonen's guitar lines are different on "We Can Be Together", "Wooden Ships" lacks the opening sailboat sound effects and the backing vocals by Ace of Cups on "The Farm" are more prominent. A few tracks from the quad version were included in the three CD box set Jefferson Airplane Loves You, though on this release the four channel recordings are reduced to two channels due to the technical limitations of CD.

The 2004 CD re-release features five additional bonus tracks from the group's annual Thanksgiving concert at the Fillmore East, New York in 1969. The album was released again in 2009, along with the entirety of the group's live performance at the Woodstock Festival in 1969, as Jefferson Airplane Woodstock Experience.

== Critical reception ==
Professional ratings
Review scores
Source	Rating
AllMusic	4/5 stars
Robert Christgau	B
The Daily Vault	A
Encyclopedia of Popular Music	4/5 stars
Rolling Stone	(favorable)
The Rolling Stone Record Guide	5/5 stars

Upon release, Ed Ward at Rolling Stone praised every track and concluded the members of the group were musical pioneers who "may raise the musical sophistication and complexity of rock and roll to new heights". Robert Christgau at Village Voice was more guarded, stating "Everybody else seems to dig it a lot, and of course it's far from bad, but everybody may be wrong".

Retrospective reviews have been favorable, with Jim Newsom at AllMusic calling it "a powerful release that neatly closed out and wrapped up the '60s", concluding that "listening to Volunteers is like opening a time capsule on the end of an era, a time when young people still believed music had the power to change the world". David Bowling at The Daily Vault similarly enthused that "Volunteers remains a powerful anti-war statement cloaked in some of the best rock ‘n’ roll of the era", while the original edition of The Rolling Stone Record Guide gave it five stars.

== Legacy ==
In 2003 the album was ranked number 370 in Rolling Stone magazine's list of the 500 greatest albums of all time, and at 373 in a 2012 revised list. Volunteers was omitted from the 2020 list.

In 2003, David Keenan included Volunteers in his The Best Albums Ever...Honest from the Scottish Sunday Herald.

== Track listing ==
Credits from original stereo and quadraphonic LPs.

Side one
No.	Title	Writer(s)	Quadraphonic Mix Length	Length
1.	"We Can Be Together"	Paul Kantner	5:56	5:48
2.	"Good Shepherd"	Traditional; arranged by Jorma Kaukonen	4:21	4:21
3.	"The Farm"	Kantner, Gary Blackman	2:32	3:15
4.	"Hey Fredrick"	Grace Slick	9:00	8:26

Side two
No.	Title	Writer(s)	Quadraphonic Mix Length	Length
1.	"Turn My Life Down"	Kaukonen	2:54	2:54
2.	"Wooden Ships"	David Crosby, Kantner, Stephen Stills	5:50	6:24
3.	"Eskimo Blue Day"	Slick, Kantner	6:15	6:31
4.	"A Song for All Seasons"	Spencer Dryden	3:28	3:28
5.	"Meadowlands"	Lev Knipper	1:04	1:04
6.	"Volunteers"	Marty Balin, Kantner	2:21	2:08

2004 CD previously unissued bonus tracks
No.	Title	Writer(s)	Length
11.	"Good Shepherd" (live, recorded November 28–29 at Fillmore East)	Traditional; arranged by Kaukonen	7:20
12.	"Somebody to Love" (live, recorded November 28–29 at Fillmore East)	Darby Slick	4:10
13.	"Plastic Fantastic Lover" (live, recorded November 28–29 at Fillmore East)	Balin	3:21
14.	"Wooden Ships" (live, recorded November 28–29 at Fillmore East)	Crosby, Kantner, Stills	7:00
15.	"Volunteers" (live, recorded November 28–29 at Fillmore East)	Balin, Kantner	3:26

== Personnel ==
Per liner notes.

Jefferson Airplane

- Grace Slick – vocals, piano on "The Farm", "Hey Fredrick", "Eskimo Blue Day" and "Volunteers", organ on "Meadowlands", recorder on "Eskimo Blue Day"
- Marty Balin – vocals, percussion
- Paul Kantner – vocals, rhythm guitar
- Jorma Kaukonen – lead guitar, vocals
- Jack Casady – bass
- Spencer Dryden – drums, percussion

Additional personnel

- Nicky Hopkins – piano on "We Can Be Together", "Hey Fredrick", "Wooden Ships", "A Song for All Seasons" and "Volunteers"
- Stephen Stills – Hammond organ on "Turn My Life Down"
- Jerry Garcia – pedal steel guitar on "The Farm"
- Joey Covington – congas on "Turn My Life Down", chair on "Eskimo Blue Day"
- David Crosby – sailboat on "Wooden Ships"
- Ace of Cups – vocals on "The Farm" and "Turn My Life Down"
- Bill Laudner – lead vocals on "A Song for All Seasons"

=== Production ===
- Al Schmitt – producer
- Rich Schmitt – engineer
- Maurice (Pat Ieraci) – 16-track
- Gut – album design, ate PB & J
- Milton Burke – album design
- Jefferson Airplane – album design
- Jim Marshall – cover photography
- Jim Smircich – back photography
- Littie Herbie Greene Herb Greene – PB & J photo
- Produced at Wally Heider Studios, San Francisco

== Charts ==
Chart (1969–1970)	Peak position
Canada Top Albums/CDs (RPM)	7
UK Albums (Official Charts)	34
US Billboard 200	13

== Certifications ==
Region	Certification	Certified units/sales
United States (RIAA)	Gold	500,000^{^}
^{^} Shipments figures based on certification alone.
