= Lather (song) =

Single by Jefferson Airplane

from the album Crown of Creation
- A-side: "Crown of Creation"
- Released: September 1968
- Recorded: February–June 1968
- Length: 2:55
- Label: RCA Records
- Songwriter(s): Grace Slick
- Producer(s): Al Schmitt

"Lather", a song by Grace Slick, performed by US rock band Jefferson Airplane, is the opening track on the 1968 album Crown of Creation and was the B-side for the single of the same name. Slick says she wrote the song for the drummer of the group Spencer Dryden, who was at the time twenty-nine years old and her boyfriend. The lyrics tell of a boy who stays as young as possible until one day when he is shattered by having finally to grow up.

Ultimate Classic Rock critic Michael Gallucci rated it Jefferson Airplane's 10th best song, calling it "Grace Slick's gentle poke at people who reach the ripe old age of 30." Gallucci described the music as "a blend of medieval and psychedelic styles, with acoustic instruments brushing up against freak-out sound effects.

The band performed the song during their 1968 appearance on The Smothers Brothers Comedy Hour.

Upon Dryden's death in 2005, Slick and other band members wrote tributes to Dryden that appeared on the group's website. Slick's ends with the first lines of the song: "Lather was 30 years old today, they took away all of his toys."

== Cover versions ==
- Tom Constanten performs a solo piano instrumental cover of this song on his album Morning Dew.
- Small Potatoes performed as part of a medley "Lather Danish Misfortune Mad Mouth" on their album Waltz of the Wallflowers (A Dysfunctional Duet).
