= Jefferson Airplane Takes Off =

Studio album by Jefferson Airplane
- Released: August 15, 1966
- Recorded: December 16, 1965 – March 21, 1966
- Studio: RCA Victor's Music Center of the World (Hollywood)
- Genres: Folk rock; psychedelic rock; psychedelic folk
- Length: 30:24
- Label: RCA Victor
- Producers: Matthew Katz, Tommy Oliver

Jefferson Airplane chronology
Jefferson Airplane Takes Off (1966)	Surrealistic Pillow (1967)

Singles from Jefferson Airplane Takes Off
- 1. "It's No Secret" Released: February 1966; 2. "Come Up the Years" Released: May 1966; 3. "Bringing Me Down" Released: August 1966

Jefferson Airplane Takes Off is the debut studio album by the American rock band Jefferson Airplane, released on August 15, 1966, by RCA Victor. The personnel differs from the later "classic" lineup: Signe Toly Anderson was the female vocalist and Skip Spence played drums. Both soon left the group—Spence in May 1966, Anderson in October—and were replaced by Grace Slick and Spencer Dryden, respectively.

== Background ==
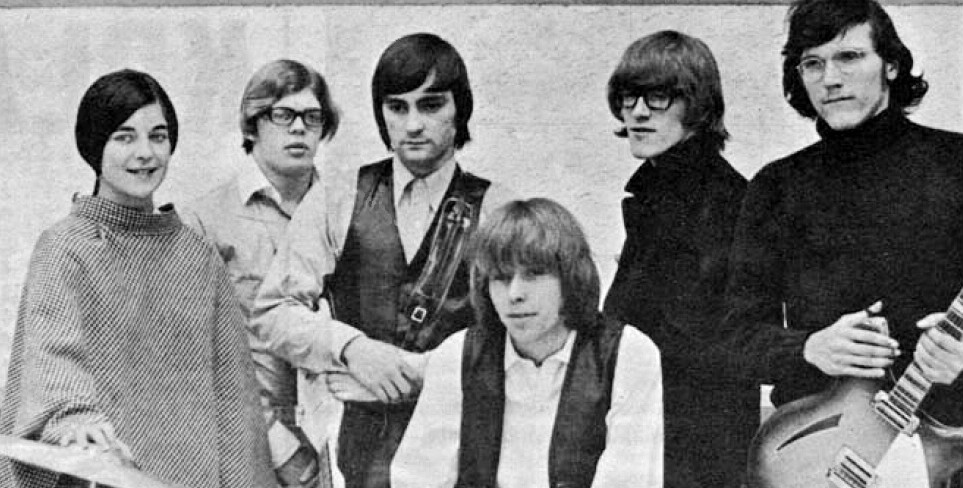
Jefferson Airplane in early 1966. Left to right: Signe Anderson, Jack Casady, Marty Balin, Skip Spence, Paul Kantner, Jorma Kaukonen.

By late 1965, Jefferson Airplane had caught the attention of "virtually every record label of significance". The band, as well as their associated nightclub, had already achieved relative popularity with the general San Francisco public; however, their profile was raised significantly when Ralph J. Gleason of the San Francisco Chronicle wrote favorably of them in his "On the Town" column, remarking, "I don't know who they will record for, but they will obviously record for someone." Original bassist Bob Harvey later recalled, "After Ralph Gleason did that column there was pandemonium. I never believed that a newspaper column could have that kind of effect until I actually saw it happen."

Under the guidance of manager Matthew Katz, the group turned down recording offers from Capitol, Valiant, Fantasy, Elektra, and London. They considered pursuing a deal with Columbia Records, who had already signed Bob Dylan and the Byrds, but they were rejected after sending in a demo recording; "Columbia didn't like us", reflected Paul Kantner, "because we weren't in their model. The Byrds were much more orderly ... We were a little anarchic musically."

Katz was first invited to check out RCA Victor by the recently signed Rod McKuen, who had written some songs he hoped to give to the band. McKuen introduced Katz to the label's A&R manager Neely Plumb, who sent Al Schmitt to San Francisco to hear the band. Schmitt was pleased with the group, and soon Plumb and Katz began negotiating a contract. The deal was solidified when RCA offered a then unheard-of advance of US$25,000, five times more than what Capitol offered, as well as "good production money". The band officially signed with RCA on November 15, 1965.

== Recording ==
The album was produced by Tommy Oliver and engineered by Dave Hassinger. Oliver had previously worked with various mainstream pop singers such as Doris Day, while Hassinger was specifically requested by the band due to his work on the Rolling Stones' song "(I Can't Get No) Satisfaction".

The recording sessions began on December 16, 1965. The first songs to be recorded were "Runnin' 'Round This World" and "It's Alright", neither of which appeared on the final record. The band continued through December 18 before returning to San Francisco for the holiday season. They recorded again on February 19–28, 1966, and March 16–21. A total of 14 songs were recorded over the three sets of sessions.

== Music and lyrics ==
Jefferson Airplane Takes Off is regarded as being more grounded in straightforward folk rock than the band's subsequent releases. Music critic Jim DeRogatis noted that the album is "dominated by Balin's simple folk ballads", which he observed "were tarted up by Anderson's fetching harmonies and the dexterous playing of Casady and Kaukonen." Katz dubbed the band's sound "fo-jazz", which Anderson described as rock with "folk roots [and] jazz chords". Balin wrote or co-wrote all of the original material on the album and sang most of the lead vocals, leading William Ruhlmann of AllMusic to state that Jefferson Airplane at the time "was still Balin's group", before Grace Slick joined and became the group's "vocal and visual focal point". Kantner and Anderson provided backup vocals and harmonies, showcasing the three-part, male-female vocal work that would continue to be staple of the band's sound after Anderson's departure.

According to band biographer Jeff Tamarkin, "although Jefferson Airplane had every intention of being successful, they let it be known from the outset that they would not pander to get there." At the time of the band's formation, many acts in pop music such as the Beatles, Bob Dylan, the Byrds, and the Rolling Stones had begun developing more mature approaches to their songwriting, and Tamarkin noted that many of Jefferson Airplane's early original works also exhibited "a sophisticated lyrical outlook and progressive instrumental arrangements".

Although the majority of the album consists of love songs, music journalist Richie Unterberger observed that their lyrics were written from an unusual "young adult" perspective that was "not as immediately accessible" to teenagers, who were generally considered pop's target audience. In his book Jefferson Airplane: every album, every song, Richard Butterworth describes the lyrics on Takes Off as "optimistic" and exhibiting a "growing social awareness" of the era's music. Comparatively, Unterberger noted that the band's cover version of Chet Powers' "Let's Get Together", later made famous by the Youngbloods, was foretelling of a "communal idealism that transcended boy-girl relationships."

== Release ==
Shortly before the album's release, RCA demanded that the band return to the studio and change the lyrics of "Let Me In" and "Run Around". The label's executives had become concerned that certain lines in the songs would cause controversy due to them being sexually suggestive or making supposed references to drugs. The original rendition of "Let Me In", a song about sexual frustration, included the line "Oh, let me in, I wanna be there / I gotta get in, you know where", which was then substituted with "Oh, let me in, I wanna be there / You shut your door, now it ain't fair". In the same song, the line "Don't tell me you want money", possibly alluding to prostitution, was changed to "Don't tell me it's so funny". Similarly, the original version of "Run Around" contained the phrase "Blinded by colors come flashing from flowers that sway as you lay under me", the latter part of which was changed to "that sway as you stay here by me".

They'd find all this meaning and give it a great deal of importance, but "trips" was just a slang word to us, part of the language. They'd sit us down with their censors and talk to us and we'd say, "You guys are crazy."

— Marty Balin

Along with these lyrical changes, the label also decided that "Runnin' 'Round This World", which included the line "The nights I've spent with you have been fantastic trips", was to be removed from the album entirely, despite having already been released months earlier as the B-side of "It's No Secret". The band attempted to rectify this by replacing the word "trips" with a guitar arpeggio, but ultimately the song was cut from the final version of the record.

These last-minute changes led to complications with the album's pressing. Originally, one stereo version and one mono version of the record was to be released, as was the standard at the time. Instead, different variants of the album were manufactured: the first pressings contained the unaltered, original 12 tracks; the second pressings had 11 tracks, omitting "Runnin' 'Round This World", and were manufactured only in mono; the third pressings, containing the altered lyrics, were the most common copies issued and sold from 1966 onward. ("Runnin' 'Round This World" was placed between "Tobacco Road" and "Come Up The Years" in the original 12 track lineup.)

=== Commercial performance ===
Jefferson Airplane Takes Off sold modestly upon release. Although the exact sales figures are not known, Tamarkin estimates that 10,000 to 20,000 copies were sold in California within the first few months; however, in the rest of the US, the album was largely unnoticed with "perhaps as few as 1,000 copies finding their way to consumers". Nevertheless, the strength of the album's sales in the band's home state pushed it onto the Billboard Top 200 on September 17, 1966. It spent a total of 11 weeks on the chart and peaked at number 128 on October 1.

=== Reception ===
Professional ratings
Review scores
Source	Rating
AllMusic	3.5/5 stars
The Daily Vault	B+
The Encyclopedia of Popular Music	2/5 stars
The Rolling Stone Album Guide	3/5 stars

In a contemporary review for Mojo-Navigator R&R News, David Harris gave the album a mixed review, saying: "I don't mean to say that it comes off poorly ... because it doesn't. Marty Balin and Signe Anderson's vocal harmonies are impeccable and the instrumental parts (especially the bass) are well arranged. The lead guitar, Jorma Kaukonene [sic], has been a whole lot better recently than he is on this LP, but his playing here is at a respectable level." Tim Jurgens of Crawdaddy! said that the album, although being "the most important album of American rock" released that year, was nevertheless "faulted" and summarized that "This is still a very good record, but we might have had a great one."

Retrospectively, David Bowling of The Daily Vault considered Jefferson Airplane Takes Off to be "a formidable debut album" and "an excellent and interesting listen".

== Track listing ==
All lead vocals on the 1966 release by Marty Balin except where noted.

Side one
No.	Title	Writer(s)	Lead vocals	Length
1.	"Blues from an Airplane"	Marty Balin, Alex Spence		2:10
2.	"Let Me In"	Marty Balin, Paul Kantner	Paul Kantner	2:55
3.	"Bringing Me Down"	Marty Balin, Paul Kantner		2:22
4.	"It's No Secret"	Marty Balin		2:37
5.	"Tobacco Road"	John D. Loudermilk (Note: "Tobacco Road" is credited to Clay Warnick on the LP, although it was written by John D. Loudermilk)		3:26
Total length:				13:32

Side two
No.	Title	Writer(s)	Lead vocals	Length
6.	"Come Up the Years"	Marty Balin, Paul Kantner		2:30
7.	"Run Around"	Marty Balin, Paul Kantner	Kantner	2:35
8.	"Let's Get Together"	Chester Powers	Kantner; Signe Toly Anderson; Balin	3:32
9.	"Don't Slip Away"	Marty Balin, Alex Spence		2:31
10.	"Chauffeur Blues"	Lester Melrose, Memphis Minnie	Anderson	2:25
11.	"And I Like It"	Marty Balin, Jorma Kaukonen		3:16
Total length:				16:52

2003 CD reissue bonus tracks
No.	Title	Writer(s)	Length
12.	"Runnin' 'Round This World" (from Early Flight)	Marty Balin, Paul Kantner	2:25
13.	"High Flying Bird" (from Early Flight)	Billy Edd Wheeler	2:17
14.	"It's Alright" (from Early Flight)	Marty Balin, Alex Spence	2:17
15.	"Go to Her" (from Jefferson Airplane Loves You)	Paul Kantner, Irving Estes	4:09
16.	"Let Me In" (uncensored version from Jefferson Airplane Loves You)	Marty Balin, Paul Kantner	3:31
17.	"Run Around" (uncensored version)	Marty Balin, Paul Kantner	2:35
18.	"Chauffeur Blues" (alternate version)	Lester Melrose and Memphis Minnie	2:49
19.	"And I Like It" (alternate version)	Marty Balin, Jorma Kaukonen	8:25
20.	"Blues from an Airplane" (instrumental; hidden track)	Marty Balin, Alex Spence	2:10
Total length:			30:38

== Personnel ==
Jefferson Airplane

- Marty Balin – vocals, rhythm guitar
- Signe Toly Anderson – vocals, percussion
- Jorma Kaukonen – lead guitar
- Paul Kantner – rhythm guitar, vocals
- Jack Casady – bass guitar
- Alex "Skip" Spence – drums
- Spencer Dryden – drums (on "Go to Her"; alternate versions of "And I Like It" and "Chauffeur Blues")

=== Production ===
- Tommy Oliver – producer
- Matthew Katz – manager, producer
- Dave Hassinger – engineer
- Ralph J. Gleason – liner notes
- Recorded in RCA Victor's Music Center of the World, Hollywood, California

== Charts ==
Chart (1966)	Peak position
US Billboard 200	128
