= Thirty Seconds Over Winterland =

Live album by Jefferson Airplane
- Released: April 1973
- Recorded: August 24–25, 1972; September 21–22, 1972
- Venues: Chicago Auditorium, Chicago; Winterland Arena, San Francisco
- Genre: Rock
- Length: 38:13
- Label: Grunt/RCA Records
- Producer: Jefferson Airplane

Jefferson Airplane chronology
Long John Silver (1972)	Thirty Seconds Over Winterland (1973)	Early Flight (1974)

Professional ratings
Review scores
Source	Rating
AllMusic	4/5 stars
The Encyclopedia of Popular Music	3/5 stars
Rolling Stone	4.5/5 stars

Thirty Seconds Over Winterland is an album by the American psychedelic rock band Jefferson Airplane. It was recorded live in August and September 1972, at the Auditorium Theatre in Chicago and the Winterland Ballroom in San Francisco. It was released in April 1973; reflecting the band's declining commercial stature, it only peaked at No. 52 on the Billboard chart.

Recorded during the Long John Silver tour, Thirty Seconds Over Winterland was the band's second live album, after Bless Its Pointed Little Head. The complete final concert of this tour may be heard on the Last Flight CD, released in 2007.

== Flying Toasters lawsuit ==
In 1989, software company Berkeley Systems released its immensely popular After Dark screensaver. The best-known of the various screensaver options was Flying Toasters. Jefferson Airplane sued Berkeley Systems in 1994, claiming that the toasters, were a copy of the winged toasters in the front cover art, illustrated by Bruce Steinberg, featured on the Thirty Seconds Over Winterland album. The band's case was lost because Berkeley claimed no prior knowledge of the artwork, jacket cover art work had to be registered separately from the sound recording, and the judge noted the band had failed to copyright the cover art.

== Track listing ==
Track times from original vinyl release.

Side one
No.	Title	Writer(s)	Length
1.	"Have You Seen the Saucers?" (recorded September 21 at Winterland)	Paul Kantner	4:15
2.	"Feel So Good" (recorded September 22 at Winterland)	Jorma Kaukonen	11:10
3.	"Crown of Creation" (recorded August 25 at Chicago Auditorium)	Kantner	4:05

Side two
No.	Title	Writer(s)	Length
1.	"When the Earth Moves Again" (recorded August 25 at Chicago Auditorium)	Kantner	4:05
2.	"Milk Train" (recorded August 25 at Chicago Auditorium)	Grace Slick, Papa John Creach, Roger Spotts	3:57
3.	"Trial by Fire" (recorded August 24 at Chicago Auditorium)	Kaukonen	5:00
4.	"Twilight Double Leader" (recorded September 21 at Winterland)	Kantner	5:41

CD Reissue Bonus Tracks
No.	Title	Writer(s)	Length
1.	"Wooden Ships"	Kantner, David Crosby, Stephen Stills	6:37
2.	"Long John Silver"	Grace Slick, Jack Casady	5:32
3.	"Come Back Baby"		7:08
4.	"Lawman"	Slick	3:14
5.	"Diana / Volunteers"	Kantner, Slick / Marty Balin, Kantner	6:06

== Personnel ==
Personnel credits from original vinyl release.

Jefferson Airplane

- Jack Casady – bass
- Paul Kantner – vocals, rhythm guitar
- Jorma Kaukonen – lead guitar, vocals
- Grace Slick – vocals
- Papa John Creach – electric violin
- John Barbata – drums, percussion
- David Freiberg – vocals

=== Production ===
- Produced and arranged by Jefferson Airplane
- Pat "Maurice" Ieraci – production coordinator
- Don Gooch – recording engineer
- Mallory "Mallory" Earl – mixing engineer
- Recorded by Wally Heider's remote unit
- Mixed at Wally Heider Studios, San Francisco
- Bruce Steinberg – album design, illustration, photography
- Randy Tuten – inner sleeve art: photo frames
- Greg Irons – inner sleeve art: "Gruntman"
- Heavy Water Lights (Joan Chase, Mary Ann Mayer, and John Hardham) – light show
- Acy Lehman – art coordination

== Charts ==
Chart (1973)	Peak position
US Billboard 200	52
