= The Ballad of You and Me and Pooneil =

Single by Jefferson Airplane

from the album After Bathing at Baxter's
- B-side: "Two Heads"
- Released: August 1967
- Recorded: June 26–27, 1967
- Genre: Psychedelic rock
- Length: 4:29, 11:06 (Alternate version)
- Label: RCA Victor
- Songwriter: Paul Kantner
- Producer: Al Schmitt

Jefferson Airplane singles chronology
"White Rabbit" (1967)	"The Ballad of You and Me and Pooneil" (1967)	"Watch Her Ride" (1967)

"The Ballad of You and Me and Pooneil" is a song by the American psychedelic rock band Jefferson Airplane. Written by Paul Kantner, the song initially appeared as an RCA Victor single, and then subsequently as the first track of their third album, After Bathing at Baxter's, in a substantially remixed version.

The title of the song refers to Winnie the Pooh as well as the folk singer Fred Neil. Parts of the lyric are taken from A. A. Milne's first book of children's poetry, When We Were Very Young. The first four lines of both the first and last verses are taken almost word-for-word from the poem "Spring Morning" in the book. Another source was the Milne poem "Halfway Down", the origin of the third verse's lines "Halfway down the stair / Is a stair where I sit". Neil was a big influence on Paul Kantner, as were Milne's books.

Billboard described the single as "interesting off-beat material" that should prove to be a big hit. Cash Box said that "insistent throbbing rhythm, guitar showers that change hues almost in a 'color show' style, psychedelic sound effects and the singular vocals of the Jefferson Airplane create a love-in, happening and carnival all rolled into one." Record World called it an "excursion into the mind and the electronic control board and other current pop Jefferson Airplane places." Mojo described "The Ballad of You and Me and Pooneil" as a "robust harmony-drenched anthem" that was central to After Bathing at Baxter's. Ultimate Classic Rock critic Michael Gallucci rated it Jefferson Airplane's 9th best song, calling it "a glorious mess of guitars, drums and vocal sparring between [Marty] Balin and [Grace] Slick."

Live versions of the song typically began with an extended feedback segment by guitarist Jorma Kaukonen and included a bass guitar solo by Jack Casady after the second verse, often lasting several minutes. Both features are included in very abbreviated form on the studio recording.

The song barely missed the Billboard Hot 100 Top 40, peaking at #42 in the Fall of 1967. The single fared better on the Cash Box Top 100, where it peaked at #24.

== In popular culture ==
- The song was featured in the fourth episode of the third season of This Is Us.
