= After Bathing at Baxter's =

Studio album by Jefferson Airplane
- Released: November 27, 1967
- Recorded: 26 June – 31 October 1967
- Studios: RCA Victor (Hollywood, California)
- Genres: Psychedelic rock; experimental rock
- Length: 43:38
- Label: RCA Victor
- Producer: Al Schmitt

Jefferson Airplane chronology
| Surrealistic Pillow (1967) | After Bathing at Baxter's (1967) | Crown of Creation (1968) |

Singles from After Bathing at Baxter's
- 1. "The Ballad of You and Me and Pooneil" Released: August 1967; 2. "Watch Her Ride" Released: December 1967

After Bathing at Baxter's is the third studio album by the San Francisco psychedelic rock band Jefferson Airplane, released on November 27, 1967, by RCA Victor in stereo and mono formats. The cover art was created by artist Ron Cobb.

== Background ==
Writing for Jefferson Airplane's third album began in the spring of 1967, just as the group's star began to soar with the number five single "Somebody to Love" and its successful parent album Surrealistic Pillow. The group appeared regularly on television to promote the album, and demand for live appearances soared. By the summer the group had become the highest-paid American live act, playing a hectic schedule of shows around North America, including a lauded appearance at the Monterey Pop Festival in June.

== Songs and recording ==
Guitarist Jorma Kaukonen had developed a version of a traditional blues song on stage, provisionally titled "Jorma's Blues", which was subsequently recorded as "Come Back Baby" at RCA on March 7, 1967. Although the song was regularly performed during concerts, it was not released on a record until its appearance on Hot Tuna's 1971 second album, First Pull Up, Then Pull Down. Three more new songs were introduced to the live set in May: Kantner's "Won't You Try" (a tribute to the Human Be-In event), "The Ballad of You and Me and Pooneil" (an ode to LSD, containing several lines from the A. A. Milne poem "Spring Morning") and "Young Girl Sunday Blues", cowritten with Marty Balin about Sally Edelstein, a 14-year-old girl who attended the band's shows and later married Israeli ambassador Michael Oren. "The Ballad of You and Me and Pooneil", "Young Girl Sunday Blues" and another new Kantner composition, "Martha", were first recorded at RCA in late May. "Martha" was a folk-inspired song with Grace Slick on recorder about Martha Wax, the runaway daughter of the mayor of Sausalito who had befriended the band.

These early sessions were scrapped after the group heard the new Beatles album Sgt. Pepper's Lonely Hearts Club Band, which encouraged them to take an even further experimental direction. After the success of Surrealistic Pillow, RCA granted the group creative freedom in the studio, and new producer Al Schmitt was more open to their experimentation than had been Rick Jarrard, the producer of Surrealistic Pillow. Slick noted: "He wasn't put off by our insanity. He was open and flexible ... he was still out of the straight world, but there was less of a polarity between us and he was open to our interest in experimentation." Kaukonen and Casady were also inspired to take the group's music in a heavier direction after hearing Jimi Hendrix and Cream, with Kaukonen applying more fuzz, feedback and distortion to his guitar sound.

The band held an unannounced live show in mid-June to record songs meant for the album, where an expansive 11-minute version of "The Ballad of You and Me and Pooneil" was taped and further overdubbed in the studio, although ultimately rejected for release, later appearing on the Jefferson Airplane Loves You box set. However, a version of "Young Girl Sunday Blues" from the show was included on the new album after further overdubs on July 13. "The Ballad of You and Me and Pooneil" was attempted for a third time on June 26 and 27, when a succinct four-and-a-half-minute version was finally captured along with a new Slick composition, the stream-of-consciousness psychedelia of "Two Heads", recorded over the following two days. The latter song was inspired by a cartoon drawing in a book belonging to drummer Spencer Dryden, which Slick called an "anti-WASP, anti-alcoholic, anti-war, anti-frigid, anti-middle-class-morals song against the suppression of the free soul inherent in every individual". These two tracks were released as the group's next single in August, although their dense, uncommercial sound proved a commercial disappointment, reaching number 42 on the Billboard chart (although "The Ballad of You and Me and Pooneil" performed considerably better on the Cash Box chart, where it peaked at number 24).

Recording for the album continued throughout the summer, stretching over five months into the fall. Throughout the sessions, studio experimentation took priority. Slick later recalled: "We wanted to discover new dimensions of sounds and ways to work with complex instrumentation but we had no idea what we were doing ... we tried an awful lot of things to find out what we could do with different electronics. We figured we were going to produce the most brilliant album released in rock." Road manager Bill Thompson concurred: "We were pretty sure what we were doing would become the greatest album ever." The group rented a mansion with a pool and underwater shooting range in Beverly Hills while recording at RCA, where wild, drug-fueled partying ensued. Members of the Grateful Dead, Buffalo Springfield, the Monkees and the Byrds would often visit, and Kaukonen even brought a motorcycle into the recording studio one night. Balin began to withdraw from the group, disgusted with what he perceived as self-indulgent behavior and "star trips" by his bandmates, saying that "everybody was in their little shell." He wrote and recorded two more songs for the album, the soft ballad "Things Are Better in the East" (a bonus track on the CD reissue) and the funky "Don't Let Me Down" (later included on the box set), but neither made the final cut, leaving "Young Girl Sunday Blues" his sole credit on the album after having contributed five songs to Surrealistic Pillow.

Kantner filled the songwriting void in Balin's increasing absence. New versions of "Martha" and "Won't You Try/Saturday Afternoon" were recorded along with his "Wild Tyme" and "Watch Her Ride", both intense acid-rock numbers celebrating the freewheeling hippie lifestyle. During the album's final day of recording on October 31, Dryden contributed the Frank Zappa-inspired sound collage "A Small Package of Value Will Come to You, Shortly" (featuring nonsensical vocal improvisations by Thompson and the band's friend Gary Blackman), while Kaukonen wrote "The Last Wall of the Castle", a showcase for his fuzz guitar work that was recorded on August 30. On September 22, Slick contributed a second composition, the jazz-inflected "Rejoyce", with freeform lyrics that referenced James Joyce's Ulysses and the Vietnam War over a complex arrangement that included piano, harpsichord, horns and recorder. Kaukonen, Casady and Dryden contributed "Spare Chaynge", a song intended to represent Jefferson Airplane's jam-oriented live improvisations. The song's nine minutes of music were pruned from a 24-minute take taped on October 31. The album ultimately cost more than $80,000 to record, ten times the cost of Surrealistic Pillow.

== Title and artwork ==
The album's title was derived from a poem written by the band's friend Gary Blackman. Kantner explained that the title translates to "After Taking LSD", "Baxter" being the group's code word for the drug.

The cover art was designed by Ron Cobb, a political cartoonist for the Los Angeles Free Press. The front cover depicts the band as a World War I–era triplane with the body of a San Francisco townhouse. Cannabis plants are shown growing from the house's flower boxes. The artwork is framed with a red bar on the bottom and a blue bar with white stars on the top, signifying the American flag. The plane, painted in full color, dispenses confetti while flying over a black-and-white landscape, embodying the white of the flag, with billboards reading messages such as "CONSUME!" and "DRINK IT" as parodies of American consumerism. The illustration continues onto the back cover, revealing a scrapheap followed by a pile of empty beverage cans. A banner attached to the plane displays the album's title. In 2008, Cobb's original painting sold at auction for $24,000.

John Hartford referenced the cover art as the inspiration for his song "Steam Powered Aereo Plane" from his album Aereo-Plain.

The gatefold artwork consists of a handwritten track listing and photographs by Alan Pappé of each band member. Author Ken Bielen writes that the lack of a group portrait highlights the members' individuality. The inner sleeve features Blackman's poem and drawings by the band and their friends, one of which was almost rejected by RCA for fear it would be misinterpreted as a vulva. (Note: Tamarkin and Butterworth write that the drawing in question was what resembled an exclamation point with an eye at the bottom, while Slick said it was a tracing made by Kantner of the bottom of a cupcake.)

== Release ==
After Bathing at Baxter's was released on November 27, 1967. RCA was reportedly displeased when the album only peaked at number 17 on the Billboard chart, failing to attain an RIAA gold certification, although it was able to reach number 9 on the Record World chart and number 14 on that of Cash Box. A second single, "Watch Her Ride" backed with "Martha", only reached number 61 on the Billboard Hot 100 (number 37 Cash Box). The band's singles never again crossed the halfway mark in the Hot 100. The group's manager Bill Graham was also dissatisfied and demanded that the next album return to the commercial sound of Surrealistic Pillow.

== Critical reception ==
Professional ratings
Review scores
| Source | Rating |
|---|---|
| AllMusic | 3.5/5 stars |
| The Daily Vault | A− |
| The Encyclopedia of Popular Music | 3/5 stars |
| The Great Rock Discography | 7/10 |
| Music Story | 4.5/5 stars |
| MusicHound Rock | 2/5 |
| Record Mirror | 3/5 stars |
| The Rolling Stone Album Guide | 4/5 stars |

Despite its commercial shortcomings, After Bathing at Baxter's received high praise from a number of critics. One of its most positive reviews came from Jann Wenner in the newly founded Rolling Stone magazine, proclaiming that Jefferson Airplane "could be the best rock and roll band in America today" and that the album was "probably the best, considering all the criteria and the exceptions, rock and roll album so far produced by an American group." A review in Hit Parader called the album "excellent" and "a good follow-up to Surrealistic Pillow"; in a later interview with the same magazine, the Moody Blues' keyboardist Mike Pinder named it one of his favorite albums, along with Sgt. Pepper's Lonely Hearts Club Band by the Beatles, Younger Than Yesterday by the Byrds, and Bookends by Simon & Garfunkel. Cash Box hailed it as a "magnificent, wailing, driving package", remarking in another issue that the single "Watch Her Ride" has a "hard rock beat with a backup centering on electrified workouts from lead guitar, grand imagery and fine vocals." Record World called the single "one of [Jefferson Airplane's] sinuous, contemporary melodies", while Billboard said it has "weird, groovy sounds throughout".

Paul Nelson wrote a negative review in Hullabaloo magazine: "The Jefferson Airplane never even get off the ground with After Bathing at Baxter's. How a great group like this can go down in flames after two fine albums is a real puzzle." The review prompted a reader to send a letter to the magazine saying that the album was "more important than Mr. Nelson thinks it is" and that it "must be graded on a curve, just as Sgt. Pepper was."

After Bathing at Baxter's did not chart in the United Kingdom, but it received attention from several British music journals. Chris Welch of Melody Maker praised the instrumental and vocal work, and deemed it the "most consistent album yet" from one of the "most mature of America's West Coast groups". Writing for Beat Instrumental, John Ford felt that it was a "slight disappointment" compared to the band's earlier material, although he praised the production and "feel" of the album, and concluded: "Airplane have good ideas which will flourish, eventually." Norman Jopling and Peter Jones wrote in Record Mirror that the album was "pretentious", and failed to match "Somebody to Love" and "White Rabbit" or contemporary albums by the Byrds and Country Joe and the Fish.

The album was voted number 352 in the second edition (dated 1999) of Colin Larkin's All Time Top 1000 Albums.

== Track listing ==
Side one

Streetmasse
| No. | Title | Writer(s) | Lead vocals | Length |
|---|---|---|---|---|
| 1. | "The Ballad of You and Me and Pooneil" ( (Note: Listed as "The Ballad of You & Me & Pooneil")) | Paul Kantner | Kantner | 4:29 |
| 2. | "A Small Package of Value Will Come to You, Shortly" | Spencer Dryden, Gary Blackman, Bill Thompson | Thompson and Blackman | 1:39 |
| 3. | "Young Girl Sunday Blues" | Marty Balin, Kantner | Balin | 3:33 |

The War Is Over
| No. | Title | Writer(s) | Lead vocals | Length |
|---|---|---|---|---|
| 4. | "Martha" | Kantner | Kantner | 3:26 |
| 5. | "Wild Tyme (H)" | Kantner | Kantner | 3:08 |

Hymn to an Older Generation
| No. | Title | Writer(s) | Lead vocals | Length |
|---|---|---|---|---|
| 6. | "The Last Wall of the Castle" | Jorma Kaukonen | Kaukonen | 2:40 |
| 7. | "Rejoyce" ( (Note: Listed as "rejoyce")) | Grace Slick | Slick | 4:01 |
| Total length: | | | | 22:56 |

Side two

How Suite It Is
| No. | Title | Writer(s) | Lead vocals | Length |
|---|---|---|---|---|
| 8. | "Watch Her Ride" | Kantner | Kantner | 3:11 |
| 9. | "Spare Chaynge" | Jack Casady, Dryden, Kaukonen | None | 9:12 |

Schizoforest Love Suite
| No. | Title | Writer(s) | Lead vocals | Length |
|---|---|---|---|---|
| 10. | "Two Heads" | Slick | Slick | 3:10 |
| 11. | "Won't You Try / Saturday Afternoon" | Kantner | Kantner | 5:09 |
| Total length: | | | | 20:42 43:38 |

2003 CD reissue bonus tracks

| No. | Title | Writer(s) | Length |
|---|---|---|---|
| 12. | "The Ballad of You and Me and Pooneil" (long version from Jefferson Airplane Loves You) | Kantner | 11:04 |
| 13. | "Martha" (single version B-side RCA 9389) | Kantner | 3:26 |
| 14. | "Two Heads" (alternate version) | Slick | 3:15 |
| 15. | "Things Are Better in the East" (demo version) | Balin | 2:31 |
| 16. | "Young Girl Sunday Blues" (instrumental; hidden track) | Balin, Kantner | 3:59 |
| Total length: | | | 24:15 67:53 |

== Personnel ==
Jefferson Airplane

- Grace Slick – piano, organ, recorder, vocals
- Marty Balin – rhythm guitar, vocals
- Paul Kantner – rhythm guitar, vocals
- Jorma Kaukonen – lead guitar, sitar, vocals
- Jack Casady – bass
- Spencer Dryden – drums, percussion, horn arrangement

Additional personnel

- Gary Blackman – vocals
- Bill Thompson – vocals

Production

- Jefferson Airplane – design, notes, song arrangement
- Al Schmitt – producer
- Richie Schmitt – engineer
- Ron Cobb – album cover, artwork
- The Walking Owls – album title
- Alan Pappé – photography
- Recorded at RCA, Hollywood

== Charts ==
| Chart (1967) | Peak position |
|---|---|
| US Billboard 200 | 17 |
