= Signe Toly Anderson =

American singer (1941–2016)

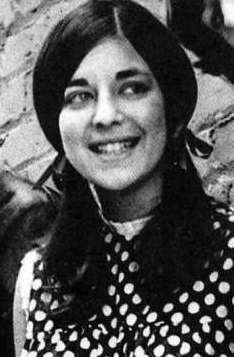
- Anderson in 1966

Background information
- Born: Signe Toly; September 15, 1941; Seattle, Washington, U.S.
- Died: January 28, 2016 (aged 74) Beaverton, Oregon, U.S.
- Genres: Rock; folk rock; blues
- Occupation: Singer
- Years active: 1965–1997
- Formerly of: Jefferson Airplane; Carl Smith and the Natural Gas Company; KBC; Jefferson Starship

Signe Toly Anderson (/ˈsɪɡni/ SIG-nee; born Signe Toly; September 15, 1941 – January 28, 2016) was an American singer who was one of the founding members of the American rock band Jefferson Airplane.

== Early life ==
Signe Toly was born in Seattle, Washington on September 15, 1941. Her parents divorced when she was three, and her mother raised her in Portland, Oregon. Toly sang in a band with three male musicians she had known in high school, under the name Three Guys and a Gal. The group performed at a campaign event for John F. Kennedy in November 1959.

== Jefferson Airplane ==
Toly was a locally known and well-respected jazz and folk singer in San Francisco, where Marty Balin heard her perform and invited her to join his band, soon named Jefferson Airplane.

Soon after joining the Airplane, Signe married one of the Merry Pranksters, Jerry Anderson; the marriage lasted from 1965 to 1974. She sang on the first Jefferson Airplane album Jefferson Airplane Takes Off, most notably on the song "Chauffeur Blues", as Signe Anderson. Because she distrusted the original manager of the Airplane, Matthew Katz, she refused to sign a contract with him until he inserted a special escape clause that would free her from management by him if she left the band for any reason.

In July 1966, Anderson informed Bill Graham that she was quitting the band after a series of shows they were playing in Chicago. She had given birth to Jerry's and her first child and realized that taking a newborn on the road was not feasible. However, Graham asked her to stay with the band through the October shows at the Winterland Ballroom in San Francisco, to which she agreed. This gave the band time to search for her successor, eventually they chose Grace Slick (after Sherry Snow declined their offer).

Anderson's last live performances with Jefferson Airplane were two sets on October 15, 1966, at The Fillmore. Both performances were recorded (as were most Fillmore shows) and have surfaced on some bootleg albums. At what seemed to be the end of the second set, Marty Balin announced that Anderson was leaving the group. Her farewell to the audience was: "I want you all to wear smiles and daisies and box balloons. I love you all. Thank you and goodbye." At several fans' requests, Anderson and the band performed her signature number "Chauffeur Blues". They finished the night with "High Flying Bird". In August 2010, Collector's Choice music in cooperation with Sony released this show as Live at The Fillmore Auditorium 10/15/66: Late Show – Signe's Farewell.

== Later life ==
After leaving the Airplane, Anderson returned to Oregon, where she sang for nine years with Carl Smith and the Natural Gas Company. In the mid-1970s, she recovered from cancer.

In 1977, she married local building contractor Michael Alois Ettlin, and continued to sing with Carl Smith.

In the mid-1990s, Anderson suffered more health problems, including a broken neck and bypass surgery, which led to serious financial problems for her family. She made guest appearances with the KBC Band and Jefferson Starship. Anderson's husband Michael Alois Ettlin died at 62 on February 21, 2011.

== Death ==
Anderson died at her home in Beaverton, Oregon, aged 74, on January 28, 2016, from the effects of chronic obstructive pulmonary disease. She died the same day as Jefferson Airplane co-founder Paul Kantner, who was also aged 74.

Her former bandmate Jorma Kaukonen wrote a public tribute honoring Signe, stating:

Signe was one of the strongest people I have ever met. She was our den mother in the early days of the Airplane...a voice of reason on more occasions than one... an important member of our dysfunctional little family. I always looked forward to seeing her when we played the Aladdin in Portland. She never complained and was always a joy.
