= Joey Covington =

American drummer (1945 – 2013)

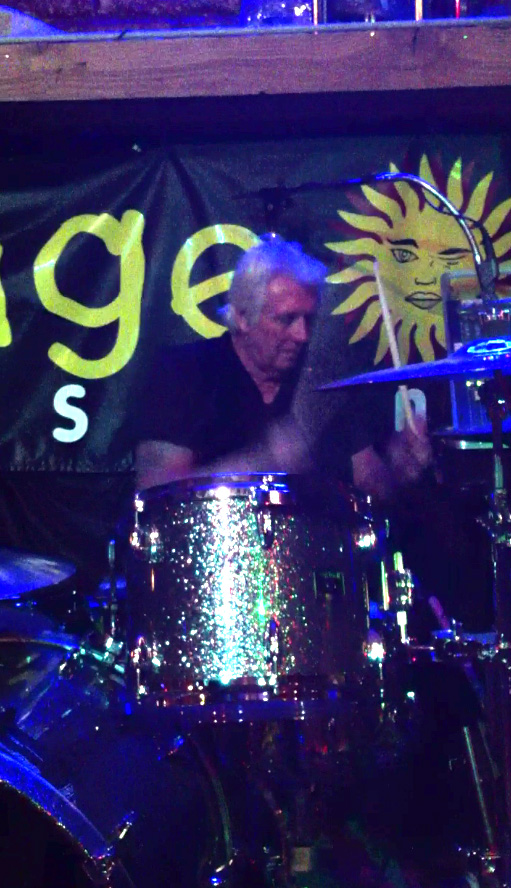

Background information
- Birth name: Joseph Edward Michno
- Born: June 27, 1945; Johnstown, Pennsylvania
- Died: June 4, 2013 (aged 67); Palm Springs, California
- Genres: Rock
- Occupations: Percussionist; songwriter; singer; producer
- Instruments: Drums; vocals
- Years active: 1955–2013

Joseph Edward Covington (born Joseph Edward Michno; June 27, 1945 – June 4, 2013) was an American drummer, best known for his involvements with Jefferson Airplane, Hot Tuna and Jefferson Starship.

== Early life ==
Though best known for his work with Jefferson Airplane, Electric Hot Tuna, and Jefferson Starship, Joey Covington (born Joseph Michno) had a long career starting at age 10 as a self-taught drummer/percussionist, along with becoming an award-winning songwriter and ultimately recording on over 22 albums, of which 16 went gold and platinum.

Covington became a professional drummer as a young teenager, taking gigs with, among other things, polka bands and in strip clubs in his hometown of Johnstown, Pennsylvania. A colorful character, on his website he listed among his fondest early memories "Getting to New York City on a Greyhound bus with a suitcase, a set of drums, and a hundred dollars in my pocket."

== 1960s and 1970s ==
In the early to mid-'60s, he was playing with bands that opened shows for the Rolling Stones, Dave Clark 5, The Shangri-Las, Lee Dorsey, Lou Christie, Chad and Jeremy, Jimmy Beaumont and the Skyliners, among others. He also had a stint playing drums for Dick Clark's Caravan of Stars featuring acts such as the Supremes.

In 1965, Covington became associated with a Pittsburgh band, The Fenways. While he was with The Fenways he played drums on 4 singles which included "I'm a Mover".

Covington settled in Los Angeles in late 1966. He was quickly discovered and produced by famed producer/songwriter Kim Fowley as a singing drummer. The single released was a cover of The Who's "Boris The Spider" with "I'll Do Better Next Time" on the B side (the first song Covington ever wrote). He co-formed several bands in Los Angeles during that period. Tsong with Mickey Rooney Jr., and a yet-to-be-named band with Papa John Creach, Jimmy Greenspoon and Joe Schermie.

Papa John later was brought in by Covington to Jefferson Airplane, Hot Tuna, Jefferson Starship and went on to a long solo recording career. Jimmy & Joe went on to become members of Three Dog Night. A member of Jefferson Airplane, Covington at first co-formed Hot Tuna with Jefferson Airplane members Jorma Kaukonen and Jack Casady in late 1968 with Hot Tuna opening shows for the Airplane. In early 1969 Covington was playing in both Hot Tuna and augmenting, then ultimately replacing Airplane drummer Spencer Dryden.

Covington, whose first recording with the Airplane was on the classic 1969 album Volunteers, appeared on the group's final recordings, writing and singing "Pretty As You Feel". 1971's "Pretty As You Feel" was the last hit song of Jefferson Airplane. The bandmembers were heading in different musical directions and by 1974, Jefferson Airplane broke up.

Covington performed with Jefferson Airplane at the Atlantic City (New Jersey, USA) Pop Festival in August 1969 just prior to Woodstock. He was particularly enthralled with Little Richard, as he watched from the side on stage along with Grace Slick. This led to an invitation to Little Richard to join him at a recording session in San Francisco, CA, USA, which resulted in the still-unreleased "Bludgeon of a Bluecoat aka The Man", featuring Richard on piano. It was scheduled for release in 1992 but withheld yet again due to lyric content, when rapper Ice T's "Cop Killer" was removed from record stores in 1992.

Covington left Jefferson Airplane, Hot Tuna and turned down Jefferson Starship to record a solo album: Joe E. Covington's Fat Fandango that included the single "Your Heart Is My Heart". The album was released worldwide resulting in high sales and critical acclaim. According to his official website, Fat Fandango was released to all online music platforms in October 2019. Never quite leaving the Airplane family, he co-wrote the award-winning and multi-platinum hit in 1976 for Jefferson Starship, "With Your Love", and Papa John Creach's only top 40 hit, "Janitor Drives A Cadillac".

== 1980s to 2000s ==
Covington remained musically active throughout his life; in the 1970s through the 1980s he formed San Francisco All Stars and toured the U.S. also touring with Quicksilver Messenger Service. The 1990s and 2000s brought Covington back to Los Angeles where he recorded and toured with various all-star line-ups.

Covington was well known around the Palm Springs area as a talented musician who delighted his audiences by sitting in with his musician friends drumming on a song or two. His last performance was in Palm Springs for a city-sponsored event on June 1, 2013. Covington thrilled his audience and signed autographs following the performance.

== Charitable events ==
Covington made numerous appearances performing for charity. A few are:

- NYFD families of victims of 9/11
- Ronald McDonald House for children
- Victims of Hurricane Katrina with Bo Diddley
- Consul General of Finland's fundraiser for Musicares
- Bread and Roses

== Death ==
Covington died in an automobile accident in Palm Springs, California, on June 4, 2013. He slammed into a retaining wall after losing control of his car at a curve in the road. He was 67. There is controversy as to whether he was wearing a seat belt. A witness removed the seat belt and was administering CPR before paramedics and law enforcement arrived at the scene. Later photos taken of the seat belt show the car's airbag indentation marks on the seat belt when the airbag deployed. According to Palm Springs Police, alcohol and drugs were not involved in the accident. Per his official website, Covington was survived by one person, his long time partner, Lauren Taines.

== Solo releases and other related ==
Singles
Act	Title	Catalogue	Year	Notes #
Joey Covington	"Boris The Spider " / "I'll Do Better Next Time"	Original Sound OS-74	1967	Joe E. Covington's Fat Fandango released 1973 & 2019
