= White Rabbit (song) =

Single by Jefferson Airplane

- Reissue single

Single by Jefferson Airplane

from the album Surrealistic Pillow
- B-side: "Plastic Fantastic Lover"
- Released: June 1967
- Recorded: November 3, 1966
- Studio: RCA Victor (Hollywood, California)
- Genre: Psychedelic rock; acid rock
- Length: 2:31
- Label: RCA Victor
- Songwriter: Grace Slick
- Producer: Rick Jarrard

Jefferson Airplane singles chronology
| "Somebody to Love" (1967) | "White Rabbit" (1967) | "The Ballad of You and Me and Pooneil" (1967) |

Music video
- "White Rabbit" on YouTube

"White Rabbit" is a song written by Grace Slick and recorded by the American rock band Jefferson Airplane for their 1967 album Surrealistic Pillow. It draws on imagery from Lewis Carroll's 1865 book Alice's Adventures in Wonderland and its 1871 sequel Through the Looking-Glass.

It was released as a single and became the band's second top-10 success, peaking at number eight on the Billboard Hot 100. The song was ranked number 478 on Rolling Stone's list of the 500 Greatest Songs of All Time in 2004, number 483 in 2010, and number 455 in 2021 and appears on The Rock and Roll Hall of Fame's 500 Songs that Shaped Rock and Roll. In 1998, the song was inducted into the Grammy Hall of Fame.

== History ==
=== Background ===
"White Rabbit" was written and performed by Grace Slick while she was still with her previous band, the Great Society. Slick then left the Great Society to join Jefferson Airplane to replace their departing female singer, Signe Toly Anderson (who left the band after the recent birth of her child). The first album Slick recorded with Jefferson Airplane was Surrealistic Pillow, and Slick provided two songs from her previous group: her own "White Rabbit" and "Somebody to Love", written by her brother-in-law Darby Slick and recorded under the title "Someone to Love" by the Great Society. The Great Society's version of "White Rabbit" was much longer than the more aggressive version of Jefferson Airplane. Both songs became top-10 hits for Jefferson Airplane and have ever since been associated with that band.

=== Composition, lyrics and inspiration ===
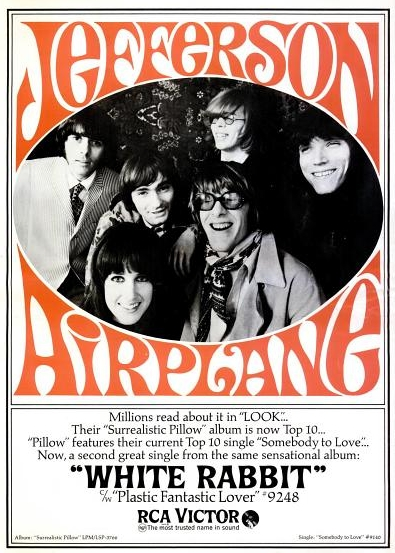
1967 trade ad for the single

"White Rabbit" is one of Grace Slick's earliest songs, written from December 1965 to January 1966. It uses imagery found in the fantasy works of Lewis Carroll — 1865's Alice's Adventures in Wonderland and its 1871 sequel Through the Looking-Glass — such as changing size after taking pills or drinking an unknown liquid.

Slick wrote the lyrics first, then composed the music at a red upright piano she had bought for US$50 with eight or ten keys missing — "that was OK because I could hear in my head the notes that weren't there" — moving between major chords for the verses and chorus. She said that the music was heavily influenced by Miles Davis's 1960 album Sketches of Spain, particularly Davis's treatment of the Concierto de Aranjuez (1939). She later said: "Writing weird stuff about Alice backed by a dark Spanish march was in step with what was going on in San Francisco then. We were all trying to get as far away from the expected as possible".

Slick said the song was supposed to be a wake-up call to parents who read their children novels such as these and then would wonder why their children used drugs. She later commented that all fairytales read to little girls have a Prince Charming who comes and saves them. But Alice did not; she was "on her own... in a very strange place, but she kept on going and she followed her curiosity – that's the White Rabbit. A lot of women could have taken a message from that story about how you can push your own agenda". Slick added that "The line in the song 'feed your head' is both about reading and psychedelics...feeding your head by paying attention: read some books, pay attention".

Characters Slick referenced include Alice, the White Rabbit, the hookah-smoking caterpillar, the White Knight, the Red Queen, and the Dormouse. Slick reportedly wrote the song after an acid trip. For Slick, "White Rabbit" "is about following your curiosity. The White Rabbit is your curiosity". For her and others in the 1960s, drugs were a part of mind expansion and social experimentation. With its enigmatic lyrics, "White Rabbit" became one of the first songs to sneak drug references in, bypassing censorship on the radio. Marty Balin, Slick's former bandmate and co-founder of Jefferson Airplane (and later Jefferson Starship), regarded the song as a "masterpiece". In interviews, Slick has related that Alice in Wonderland was often read to her as a child and remained a vivid memory well into her adulthood.

In an interview with The Wall Street Journal, Slick mentioned that, in addition to Alice in Wonderland, her other inspiration for the song was Ravel's Boléro. Like Boléro, "White Rabbit" is essentially one long crescendo. The music combined with the song's lyrics strongly suggests the sensory distortions experienced with hallucinogens, and the song was later used in pop culture to imply or accompany just such a state.

=== Recording by Jefferson Airplane ===
The song was first played by the Great Society in a bar in San Francisco in early 1966, and later when they opened the bill for bigger bands like the Grateful Dead. They made a series of demo records for Autumn Records, for which they were assisted by Sly Stone. Grace Slick said: "We were so bad that Sly eventually played all the instruments so the demo would sound OK". When Slick joined Jefferson Airplane later in 1966, she taught the song to the band, who recorded it for their album Surrealistic Pillow. "White Rabbit" is in the key of F-sharp which Slick acknowledges "is difficult for guitar players as it requires some intricate fingering".

== Reception and legacy ==
Cash Box called it "a real strong outing guaranteed to get lots of attention." Record World said it has "a little bolero sound and a haunting lyric." Reviewing several of Jefferson Airplane's albums for Mojo in 1998, Jon Savage described "White Rabbit" as "one of the oddest records ever to make the US Top 10, being pure, relentless build from start to finish." Ultimate Classic Rock critic Michael Gallucci rated it Jefferson Airplane's 2nd best song, calling it "one of the druggiest cuts ever recorded" and claiming that "the crawling, hazy pace was meant to mirror the time-altering effects of LSD."

Em Casalena of American Songwriter wrote, "[the track] is one of the most recognizable psychedelic rock songs from the 1960s. Whether you were around to hear it debut or discovered it decades later, it's a song that has stood the test of time in ways that many similar tracks from the 1960s haven't. It's San Francisco, it's Alice In Wonderland, it's a time capsule."

== Charts ==
=== Weekly charts ===
| Chart (1967) | Peak position |
|---|---|
| Canada RPM Top Singles | 1 |
| US Billboard Hot 100 | 8 |
| US Cash Box Top 100 | 6 |

| Chart (1970) | Peak position |
|---|---|
| Netherlands (Dutch Top 40) | 3 |

| Chart (1987) | Peak position |
|---|---|
| UK Singles Chart (OCC) | 94 |

| Chart (2022) | Peak position |
|---|---|
| Hungary (Single Top 40) | 35 |

=== Year-end charts ===
| Chart (1967) | Rank |
|---|---|
| Canada | 48 |
| US Billboard Hot 100 | 81 |
| US Cash Box | 60 |
| Cashbox (11 weeks): 59, 45, 23, 14, 12, 11, 8, 6, 7, 22, 41 | - |

== Certifications ==
| Region | Certification | Certified units/sales |
|---|---|---|
| New Zealand (RMNZ) | Platinum | 30,000^{‡} |
| United Kingdom (BPI) | Gold | 400,000^{‡} |
| United States (RIAA) | 2× Platinum | 2,000,000^{‡} |
^{‡} Sales+streaming figures based on certification alone.

== Personnel ==
- Grace Slick – vocals
- Jorma Kaukonen – lead guitar
- Paul Kantner – rhythm guitar
- Jack Casady – bass
- Spencer Dryden – drums

== In popular culture ==
- A lyric from the song was used as the title of the 1971 novel Go Ask Alice.
- The song is referenced prominently in the 1971 novel Fear and Loathing in Las Vegas and was subsequently featured in the 1998 film adaptation.
- The song was used in a scene in the movie Platoon released in 1986.
- The song was used in episode 9 "The Blue Scorpion" of The Twilight Zone.
- The song was used in a scene and during end credits of the movie The Game released in 1997.
- The song was used in season 1 episode 7 "Down Neck" of The Sopranos
- The song was used in season 5 episode 1 "In Country...Club" of American Dad!.
- The song was used in the first episode of Stranger Things.
- The song was used in episode 8 "Jezebels" of The Handmaid's Tale
- The song is prominently featured in a scene in the film The Matrix Resurrections and also in the film trailer.
- The vocals were sampled and used by Paul Kalkbrenner in his song "Feed your head".
- The song was used in season 10 episode 6 "D'Oh in the Wind", season 16 episode 6 "Midnight Rx" and season 19 episode 19 "Mona Leaves-a" in The Simpsons.
- In season 2 episode 7 of Futurama "A Head in the Polls", Richard Nixon's head is seen singing the end of the song before declaring "I'm meeting you halfway, you stupid hippies."
