= Spencer Dryden =

American drummer (1938–2005)

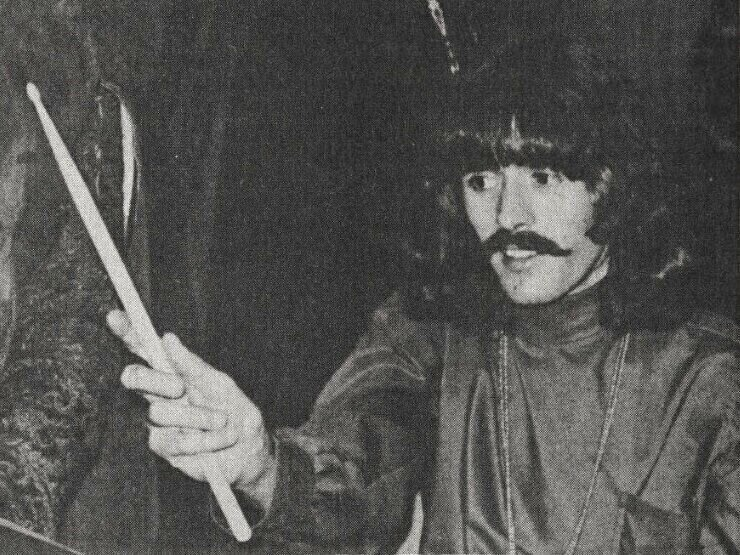
- Dryden c. early 1968

Background information
- Born: Spencer Charles Dryden; April 7, 1938; New York City, U.S.
- Died: January 11, 2005 (aged 66) Petaluma, California, U.S.
- Genres: Psychedelic rock, acid rock, country rock, jazz
- Occupation: Musician
- Instrument: Drums
- Years active: 1965–1995
- Formerly of: Jefferson Airplane; New Riders of the Purple Sage; The Peanut Butter Conspiracy; Dinosaurs
- Parents: Wheeler Dryden; Alice May Chapple Dryden Judd
- Relatives: Leo Dryden (paternal grandfather); Hannah Chaplin (paternal grandmother); Sydney and Charlie Chaplin (uncles)

Spencer Charles Dryden (April 7, 1938 – January 11, 2005) was an American musician best known as the drummer for Jefferson Airplane and New Riders of the Purple Sage. He also played with Dinosaurs, and the Ashes (later known as the Peanut Butter Conspiracy). He was inducted into the Rock and Roll Hall of Fame in 1996 as a member of Jefferson Airplane.

== Life and career ==
=== Early life ===
Spencer Charles Dryden was born in 1938 in New York City to Alice Chapple and George Dryden Wheeler Jr. Alice Chapple was a ballet dancer with Anna Pavlova's dance company, and a member of the Radio City Ballet Company; Wheeler Dryden was an English-born actor who was also a half-brother of Charlie Chaplin. After becoming an American citizen in 1936 he later worked as a director. When Spencer Dryden was growing up, he carefully concealed his relationship with his world-famous half-uncle, not wanting to be judged on his name.

When Dryden was an infant, the family moved to Los Angeles where his father went to work as an assistant director for Chaplin. His parents divorced in 1943. His mother later remarried, so Spencer would later have either two half- or 2 step-sisters: Ginny and Marilyn. He attended Glendale High School (Glendale, California), and in 1955 he graduated from the Army and Navy Academy in Carlsbad, California.

In interviews, Dryden fondly recalled playing at his famous uncle's Hollywood studio as a child when visiting his father. Dryden's father was a jazz fan, and exposed him to the jazz scene by taking him to Los Angeles jazz clubs during the 1950s. These inspired Dryden's musical ambitions.

During that time, Dryden became friends with Lloyd Miller, also born in 1938, who lived down the street on Royal Boulevard in the Rossmoyne neighborhood of Glendale, California. Because they both liked jazz, Miller suggested that the two start a band, and encouraged Dryden to play drums. Since Dryden didn't have a drum set, Miller fashioned an instrument by thumb-tacking an old inner tube over a wooden barrel with no ends. Miller would pump his player piano, play cornet or clarinet and Dryden would bang out beats on the drum.

One day Miller walked to Dryden's house and heard him playing on a full drum set. He was playing Baby Dodds' solos to perfection, even the difficult nerve sticks. Soon they had recruited trumpet player Buzz Leifer, a Glendale High acquaintance of Dryden's, a trombone player, Miller's friend Faith Jackson on piano, and a banjo player. The band, called the Smog City Six, would rehearse in Miller's garage. After his parents complained, they played on neighborhood lawns for short concerts until they had to flee from cops.

Soon they were sought after for their lawn jams. Their final New Orleans-style jazz gig was for the spring festival at Miller's school, Flintridge Prep. After that Dryden 'went modern' and began playing cool jazz in Hollywood and Los Angeles. Miller also added modern jazz to his styles, and the two jammed a few more times at Miller's before losing contact. Both musicians made their mark in different ways.

In 1952, after Chaplin moved to Switzerland, Dryden's father managed Chaplin's business affairs in the U.S. until his studios were sold in 1954. His father died in 1957, when Dryden was 19 years old.

=== Jefferson Airplane ===
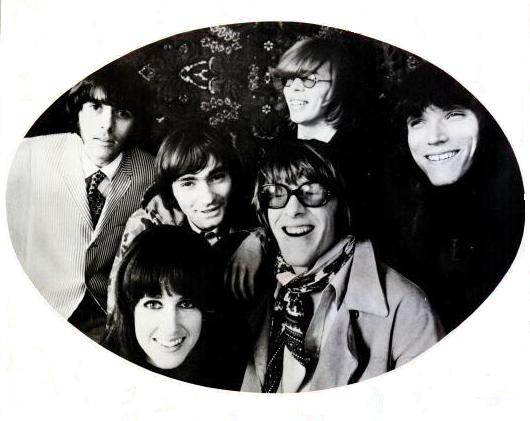
Dryden (far left) with Jefferson Airplane in 1967

In mid-1966, Dryden was recruited to replace Skip Spence as the drummer in Jefferson Airplane, a leading San Francisco psychedelic band. Together with bassist Jack Casady, he helped create an exceptional rhythm section. A feature of live Airplane sets at the time were free-form improvisational jams, with Dryden's licks complementing Casady's fluid style, examples of which can be heard on "Thing" and "Bear Melt" from Bless Its Pointed Little Head. During this period, he had an affair with Grace Slick.

The song "Lather", appearing on the Airplane's Crown of Creation, is said to have been written by Grace Slick on the occasion of Dryden's thirtieth birthday. Its lyrics tell of a boy who stays as young as possible until one day when he is shattered by having to finally grow up.

Founding editor of Rolling Stone and music critic, Ralph J. Gleason, published The Jefferson Airplane and the San Francisco Sound in 1969. The book included a 44-page interview with Dryden.

Dryden quit Jefferson Airplane in February 1970. This followed the group's violent experiences at the notorious Altamont Festival, where lead singer Marty Balin was knocked unconscious by Hells Angels bikers, and a festival patron, Meredith Hunter, was fatally stabbed. Dryden seemed to have some sense of foreboding about the concert, as he initially did not want to play there, saying the "vibes" were wrong.

=== New Riders of the Purple Sage, Dinosaurs ===
Dryden left the music business for a short period, but returned to drumming as a member of the New Riders of the Purple Sage. He performed and recorded with them from late 1970 until 1977, at which point he became the manager of the band. After leaving the New Riders, Dryden went on to play a lengthy stint with Dinosaurs and Barry Melton's band before retiring from drumming in 1995.

=== Later life ===
Dryden did not participate in Jefferson Airplane's 1989 reunion. In 1996, Dryden was inducted into the Rock and Roll Hall of Fame along with the rest of Jefferson Airplane, where he played with the band for the first time since 1970. In 2003 Dryden joined the group onstage for the last time, in the Jefferson Starship Galactic Reunion.

He lived in relative obscurity, reportedly in a small house on rented property with a few acres in Penngrove, California. He lost his home due to a fire in 2003. A few years before his death, Dryden needed hip replacement and heart surgeries. In May 2004, a benefit concert that included performances by Bob Weir of the Grateful Dead and Warren Haynes was held, raising US$36,000 to help pay Dryden's medical expenses. Later, in 2004, he was diagnosed with cancer. The benefit re-kindled Dryden's friendship with Jefferson Airplane band member Jorma Kaukonen, who remembered him fondly for the way he said "Aww, MAN!" It was not until shortly before Dryden's death that Kaukonen learned that Dryden was the nephew of Charlie Chaplin. Dryden's last public appearance was in 2004 with Jefferson Airplane band members, at a DVD party for the release of the group's Fly documentary.

Dryden died from metastasized colon cancer on January 11, 2005. Married three times, he was survived by his three sons, Jeffrey, Jesse, and Jackson Dryden, six grandchildren, and his mother, Alice May Chapple Dryden Judd. She died on December 25, 2005, at the age of 94.

At the news of his death, Grace Slick and other band members wrote tributes to Dryden that appeared on the group's website. Slick's tribute ends with these lyrics: “Lather was 30 years old today, they took away all of his toys." – Grace Slick (January 13, 2005).

== Legacy and honors ==
- In 1996 Dryden was inducted into the Rock and Roll Hall of Fame.
