= Dragon Fly (album) =

Studio album by Grace Slick, Paul Kantner and Jefferson Starship
- Released: October 1974
- Recorded: July 1974
- Studios: Wally Heider Studios, San Francisco
- Genres: Rock, progressive rock
- Length: 42:25
- Label: Grunt/RCA Records
- Producer: Jefferson Starship / Larry Cox

Jefferson Starship chronology
Dragon Fly (1974)	Red Octopus (1975)

Grace Slick chronology
Manhole (1974)	Dragon Fly (1974)	Dreams (1980)

Paul Kantner chronology
Baron von Tollbooth & the Chrome Nun (1973)	Dragon Fly (1974)	Planet Earth Rock and Roll Orchestra (1983)

Dragon Fly is the debut album by Jefferson Starship, released on Grunt Records in 1974. It peaked at No. 11 on the Billboard 200, and has been certified a gold album. Credited to Grace Slick, Paul Kantner, and Jefferson Starship, the band itself was a turning point after a series of four albums centering on the partnership of Kantner and Slick during the disintegration of Jefferson Airplane through the early 1970s.

== Background ==
After Jefferson Airplane's 1972 tour supporting Long John Silver, the band went on hiatus. Paul Kantner, Grace Slick and David Freiberg worked on Baron Von Tollbooth and the Chrome Nun while Slick made her first solo album Manhole; both albums used various members of the Airplane, including Jorma Kaukonen and Jack Casady, along with new players like guitarist Craig Chaquico and bassist/keyboardist Pete Sears. Neither album cracked the top 100 on Billboard, and Jack and Jorma seemed uninterested in returning for a new Airplane album and tour. This prompted Kantner and Slick to form a new band without them, consisting of all the members of the last lineup of the Airplane except for Chaquico replacing Kaukonen on guitar and Jorma's brother Peter Kaukonen replacing Casady on bass. The new band, named Jefferson Starship after the credit on Paul's 1970 solo album Blows Against the Empire (manager Bill Thompson also thought it made good business sense to keep the Jefferson name), undertook a spring 1974 tour playing a set list drawn largely from the Airplane-related albums of the early 1970s including Blows, Sunfighter, Baron Von Tollbooth and Manhole. The tour was critically and commercially well-received, which set the stage for the band to record a studio album. Just before this happened, Peter Kaukonen was dropped from the lineup and replaced by Pete Sears.

== Songs and recording ==
Recording on the album commenced in July 1974 at San Francisco's Wally Heider Studios, where the last three Airplane studio albums had been cut. The sessions were produced by Larry Cox, who had recently produced the Climax hit "Precious and Few" and been recommended to the group by Maurice Ieraci, the manager of Grunt Records. Cox had a contentious initial session with the group, which in his words consisted of "Slick immediately testing me. She'd dish it out until you'd stop her and she'd found your limit. But she never found my limit because I'd always carry it as far as she would go until she got tired of it". That first session, on July 1, produced the Kantner rocker and opening track "Ride The Tiger", with lyrics co-written by Slick and Byong Yu, Grace and Paul's Tae Kwon Do teacher. Kantner later noted that Yu "gave us the reflection on the differences between Asian and Western cultures". "Ride The Tiger" proved a popular number that often opened Jefferson Starship shows for many years. Slick also wrote another song in tribute to Yu, using the punning title "Be Young You". Other songs completed early in the sessions included "Come To Life", featuring words by Grateful Dead lyricist Robert Hunter, Chaquico's "That's For Sure", and the Papa John Creach number "Devil's Den", with lyrics by Slick, which showcased his electric violin work.

The sci-fi closing number "Hyperdrive" originated with a series of lyrics Slick had penned several years prior, inspired by her reading the work of architect and futurist Buckminster Fuller. She had been looking for music to go with them but did not find it until rehearsals for the new album when Sears sat at the piano to play some new music he had written. Slick instantly recognized that her words would fit, later noting "I could not believe it because you hardly ever get lyrics to fit music when both of them have been written independently". The song was a complex, multi-sectional progressive rock composition with harpsichord, mellotron, and lengthy solos from Chaquico and Creach.

The lengthy progressive power ballad "Caroline" originated from music by Paul Kantner. Wanting it to have romantic lyrics, he ended up tapping ex-Airplane singer Marty Balin to supply them. Balin had not appeared on an Airplane or Airplane-offshoot album since Volunteers in 1969, but the results were so artistically satisfying that he also volunteered to sing the song as a guest artist; his photo even appeared with that of the rest of the band members on the back cover. This collaboration ultimately paved the way for Balin to rejoin his old bandmates full-time in Jefferson Starship the following year, where he would remain until 1978. For the fall 1974 tour promoting Dragon Fly, just prior to Marty rejoining as a full-time member, Freiberg took lead vocal on the song.

Overall, while the sound of the album still displayed some of the psychedelic and progressive rock stylistic tendencies of the group's past it was more focused and streamlined, with the looser improvisational tendencies of Casady and Kaukonen replaced by tighter, pop-oriented arrangements revolving around more forceful hooks. Similarly, while the lyrics often still retained a philosophical bent ("Ride The Tiger", "Hyperdrive"), the socio-political concerns of the Airplane were largely absent, and "Caroline" foreshadowed a move to more romantic material.

Professional ratings
Review scores
Source	Rating
Allmusic	3/5 stars
Christgau's Record Guide	C+

== Release and reception ==
Released in October 1974, Dragon Fly charted at number 11 and received an RIAA gold certification within six months, becoming the biggest success any of them had since Jefferson Airplane's Bark in 1971. Two singles were released from the album: "Ride the Tiger" reached #84 on the Billboard Hot 100 and while the follow-up single "Caroline" did not chart, it became an FM staple and was acclaimed as the album's centerpiece, with many listeners excited by Balin's return. In addition, the song "Hyperdrive" was used in the opening ceremonies of the 1976 World Science Fiction Convention, MidAmeriCon, in Kansas City, Missouri.

Critical reaction to the album at the time was mixed-to-positive. Billboard observed that there were "several superb rock cuts in the best tradition of Jefferson Airplane and some equally well done ballads", concluding that it was the best work the members had produced in a long time. Bud Scoppa at Rolling Stone scoffed that Paul and Grace were "unknowing self-parodists" although he positively concluded that the album was "at worst listenable and at best surprisingly engaging". Cashbox enthused that "this new Starship LP is well worth a listen as the aforementioned talented people collaborate in making a proactive record", citing "Hyperdrive" as a favorite. Robert Christgau gave the album a C+ but also singled out "Hyperdrive" as a key cut "in which supertechnology (spirit-powered, perhaps?) cuts through corners in time". Retrospectively, William Ruhlmann at AllMusic thought that although the material was uneven, it sounded like the work of a seasoned band; he praised "All Fly Away", "Hyperdrive" and especially "Caroline", which he called "one of the best songs the Airplane/Starship ever did".

== Track listing ==
Side one
No.	Title	Lyrics	Music	Length
1.	"Ride the Tiger"	Byong Yu, Grace Slick, Paul Kantner	Paul Kantner	5:11
2.	"That’s for Sure"	Jerry Gallup	Craig Chaquico	4:58
3.	"Be Young You"	Grace Slick	Grace Slick	3:49
4.	"Caroline"	Marty Balin	Paul Kantner	7:29

Side two
No.	Title	Lyrics	Music	Length
5.	"Devil's Den"	Grace Slick	Papa John Creach	4:03
6.	"Come to Life"	Robert Hunter	David Freiberg, Steven Schuster	3:46
7.	"All Fly Away"	Tom Pacheco	Tom Pacheco	5:25
8.	"Hyperdrive"	Grace Slick	Pete Sears	7:44

== Personnel ==
- Grace Slick – lead (3, 5, 8) and backing vocals; piano (3)
- Paul Kantner – lead (1, 7) and backing vocals, rhythm guitar
- David Freiberg – lead (2, 6) and backing vocals, keyboards (1, 2, 4), piano (5, 6), organ (7, 8), bass (2)
- Papa John Creach – electric violin (1, 2, 5–8)
- Craig Chaquico – lead guitar
- Pete Sears – bass (1, 3–8), piano (2, 4, 7, 8), harpsichord (4, 8), backing vocals
- John Barbata – drums, percussion
- Marty Balin – lead vocals (4)

Production

- Jefferson Starship – producer
- Larry Cox – producer, engineer
- Pat Ieraci (Maurice) – production coordinator
- Steve Mantoani – recordist
- Paul Dowell – amp consultant
- Bill Thompson – manager
- Acy Lehman, Frank Mulvey – art directors
- Peter Lloyd – illustration
- Recorded and Mixed at Wally Heider's, San Francisco

== Charts ==
Chart (1974–75)	Peak position
Australian albums (Kent Music Report)	60
Canada Top Albums/CDs (RPM)	18
US Billboard 200	11

== Certifications ==
Region	Certification	Certified units/sales
United States (RIAA)	Gold	500,000^{^}
^{^} Shipments figures based on certification alone.
