= The Planet Earth Rock and Roll Orchestra =

Nickname for various artists recording in the early 1970s

The Planet Earth Rock and Roll Orchestra (PERRO) is a nickname given to some artists who recorded together in the early 1970s. They were predominantly members of Jefferson Airplane, the Grateful Dead, Quicksilver Messenger Service, and Crosby, Stills, Nash & Young. Their first album together was for Paul Kantner/Jefferson Starship's Blows Against the Empire.

Starship founder Paul Kantner came up with the term "Planet Earth Rock and Roll Orchestra", a label of reference to the San Francisco musicians that played on David Crosby's If I Could Only Remember My Name. During the sessions for Crosby's album at Wally Heider Studios, the musicians of each band (who were working in other rooms) dropped in to the sessions and improvised hours of music, and everything was recorded. Some of the basic tracks played during these recorded sessions in 1971 were used for Crosby's album. Engineer Stephen Barncard and David Crosby made rough mixes of some of the session tapes, and in 1991 Graham Nash sent a DAT tape to Paul Kantner which later showed up in the tape trading markets as a 'pristine' digital copy. Barncard came up with the PERRO abbreviation when he needed to identify the 2 inch wide tapes on sides, standing vertically.

The "PERRO Chorus" is credited on Crosby's song, "What Are Their Names" and several other solo albums after Crosby's (see discography). The name Jefferson Starship was later used for Paul Kantner and Grace Slick's new band formed in 1974. Paul Kantner recorded a solo album in 1983 as a tribute to this time, Planet Earth Rock and Roll Orchestra.

== Rehearsal Tapes Personnel ==
- David Crosby – guitar, vocals
- Graham Nash – guitar, vocals
- Paul Kantner – guitar, banjo, vocals
- Grace Slick – piano, vocals
- Jorma Kaukonen – lead guitar
- Jack Casady – bass
- Jerry Garcia – guitar, vocals
- Phil Lesh – bass
- Bill Kreutzmann – drums
- Mickey Hart – percussion
- David Freiberg – viola, vocals
- Stephen Barncard - producer, engineer, archivist

== Discography ==
Year	Title	Chart positions	Certification
Year	Title	US	Certification
1970	Blows Against the Empire by Paul Kantner and Jefferson Starship	20	Gold (RIAA)
1971	If I Could Only Remember My Name by David Crosby	12	Gold (RIAA)
1971	Songs for Beginners by Graham Nash	15	Gold (RIAA)
1971	Sunfighter by Paul Kantner and Grace Slick	89	—
1971	Papa John Creach by Papa John Creach	94	—
1972	Graham Nash David Crosby by Graham Nash and David Crosby	4	Gold (RIAA)
1972	Rolling Thunder by Mickey Hart	190	—
1973	Baron von Tollbooth & the Chrome Nun by Paul Kantner, Grace Slick, and David Freiberg	120	—
1983	Planet Earth Rock and Roll Orchestra by Paul Kantner	—	—
"—" denotes release did not chart and/or not certified.

== See also ==
- San Francisco Sound
