= Planet Earth Rock and Roll Orchestra (album) =

Studio album by Paul Kantner
- Released: August 1983
- Recorded: 1983 at the Automatt and The Pen, San Francisco
- Genre: Rock, psychedelic rock
- Length: 38:50
- Label: RCA
- Producer: Scott Mathews, Ron Nagle, Paul Kantner

Paul Kantner chronology
Dragon Fly (1974)	Planet Earth Rock and Roll Orchestra (1983)

Professional ratings
Review scores
Source	Rating
AllMusic	3/5 stars
Robert Christgau	D+

Planet Earth Rock and Roll Orchestra is the final solo album by Paul Kantner and the only Kantner solo release to be solely credited to the singer-songwriter. The title comes from an unofficial name for San Francisco artists who recorded on various albums in 1970–1973, also known as PERRO. "The Mountain Song" is dedicated "to David C, Jerry G, Graham N, Grace S, David F, Billy K and Mickey H and to one summer when all of our schedules almost didn't conflict," and was written during the 1970s recording sessions by Kantner and Jerry Garcia. On the album, Kantner utilizes many of his collaborators and family members to front an extended musical trip similar to his then-recent Jefferson Starship efforts.

== Novel ==
Kantner had intended this record to be a soundtrack to a novel he was writing at the time. The album is the sequel to Kantner's Hugo Award nominated 1970 album Blows Against the Empire, and carries the sub-title "The Empire Blows Back." At the time of the album's release, the novel had not yet been completed but included with the album was an insert which explained the story. The insert describes a San Francisco band that develops telepathic amplification technology, which attracts the attention of various governments. The group attempts to escape to the safety of the Australian Outback, and joins a self-sufficient settlement of over 1500 people. The US government agents track the band down and attempt to take the technology for use in the Cold War. The telepathic children assist in creating a shield around the settlement that then escapes into space. Also included on the album insert were descriptions of what each song meant in the overall story. The full-length novel was later published by Kantner's own company, Little Dragon Press.

The novel includes notations for a full soundtrack which would have included (in the order indicated in the novel) :

1. "America" (from KBC Band)
2. "The Planet Earth Rock'n'Roll Orchestra"
3. "She's a Telepath"
4. "Teddy Bear's Picnic" (Bratton / Kennedy song, also covered by Jerry Garcia)
5. "Circle Of Fire"
6. "I'm An Asshole" (never written song, set of lyrics only in the novel, Kantner's notes indicate a Ramones-type punk song)
7. "Teaching The Computers To Dream" (never recorded, played live by Jefferson Starship in 2000-2004, later recycled as "On The Threshold Of Fire" on Jefferson's Tree of Liberty)
8. "I Am Machine" (never written song, set of lyrics only in the novel)
9. "Girl With The Hungry Eyes" (from Jefferson Starship's Freedom at Point Zero)
10. "Mount Shasta"
11. "Lilith's Song"
12. "The Three Oddest Words" (poem by Wislawa Szymborska)
13. "Wooden Ships" (from Jefferson Airplane's Volunteers)
14. "Transsubstantiation"
15. "The Mountain Song"
16. "Declaration Of Independence"
17. "Underground"
18. "I Came Back From The Jaws Of The Dragon" (from Jefferson Starship's Winds Of Change)
19. "Good Shepherd" (from Jefferson Airplane's Volunteers)
20. "Fireball Chant" (never written experimental instrumental in the style of "Underground")
21. "The Sky Is No Limit"
22. "Planes" (from Jefferson Airplane's Jefferson Airplane)
23. "Let's Go"

== Track listing ==
Side A: America
No.	Title	Lyrics	Music	Length
1.	"The Planet Earth Rock and Roll Orchestra"	Paul Kantner	Kantner	4:07
2.	"(She Is a) Telepath"	Kantner	Kantner	2:51
3.	"Circle of Fire" (Recorded summer 1982; originally intended for the Jefferson Starship album Winds of Change)	Kantner	Kantner	3:47
4.	"Mount Shasta"	(instrumental)	Kantner, Grace Slick, Scott Mathews, Ron Nagle	2:44
5.	"Lilith's Song"	Kantner	Kantner, Slick, Pete Sears	6:42

Side B: Australia...OZ & Beyond
No.	Title	Lyrics	Music	Length
1.	"Transubstantiation: Part I: Esperanto / Part II: Science Friction"	(instrumental) / Kantner	Kantner, Slick, Mathews, Nagle / Kantner	1:28 / 2:04
2.	"The Mountain Song"	Kantner, Jerry Garcia	Kantner, Garcia	5:02
3.	"Declaration of Independence"	Wolcott Gibbs	Celius Dougherty	1:38
4.	"Underground (the Laboratories)"	Slick, Alexander Kantner	P. Kantner, Mathews, Nagle	2:13
5.	"The Sky Is No Limit"	Kantner, China Kantner	P. Kantner	2:51
6.	"Let's Go"	Kantner	Kantner	5:02

== Personnel ==
- Paul Kantner – vocals, guitars, banjo, glass harmonica, synthesizers on "Circle of Fire", lead guitar on "Underground"
- Grace Slick – vocals, piano on "The Mountain Song" and "The Sky Is No Limit"
- Jack Casady – bass
- China Kantner – vocals on "Declaration of Independence" and "The Sky Is No Limit"
- Alexander Kantner – vocals on "Underground"
- Craig Chaquico – lead guitar
- Pete Sears – piano on "The Planet Earth Rock and Roll Orchestra", "Lilith's Song", and "Science Friction", bass on "Circle of Fire"
- Aynsley Dunbar – drums
- Scott Mathews – guitar, percussion, pedal steel guitar, Linn drums, glass harmonica, vocoder, synthesizers on "Circle of Fire", saxophones on "Circle of Fire" and "The Sky Is No Limit", vocals on "Esperanto", mandolin on "Esperanto", harmonica on "Esperanto", piano on "Esperanto", organ on "Esperanto", bass drum on "Esperanto"
- Ron Nagle – piano on "Esperanto", vocals on "Esperanto"
- The Dūrocs – sound effects on "The Mountain Song"
- Ronnie Montrose – lead guitar on "(She Is A) Telepath"
- Flo & Eddie – vocals
- Mickey Thomas – vocals on "Circle of Fire"
- David Freiberg – synthesizers and vocals on "Circle of Fire"
- John Blakeley – 2nd rhythm guitar on "Let's Go"

== Production ==
- Proud Pork Productions (Scott Mathews, Ron Nagle) – producer, engineer, additional production on "Circle of Fire", construction of "Crowded Village" central section on "Mount Shasta"
- Paul Kantner – director, additional production on "Circle of Fire"
- Pat Ieraci (Maurice) – production coordinator
- Vicky Ieraci – assistant production coordinator
- Ken Kessie – mixing, remixing on "Circle of Fire"
- Maureen Droney – engineer, assistant mixing
- David Frazer – engineer
- Wayne Lewis – engineer
- Steve Fontana – engineer
- Artists & Friends, Inc. (Jim Welch) – art direction
- Bud Thon – illustration
- Recorded at The Automatt in San Francisco
- Additional music and sound effects recorded at The Pen, San Francisco
- Mastered by Jeff Sanders (sound recording) and Lindy Griffin at Kendun Recorders, Burbank

== Singles ==
- "The Planet Earth Rock and Roll Orchestra" b/w "The Sky Is No Limit" (1983)
