= Manhole (album) =

Studio album by Grace Slick
- Released: January 4, 1974
- Recorded: 1973
- Studios: Wally Heider, San Francisco; Olympic, London
- Genres: Progressive rock, psychedelic rock
- Length: 37:56
- Label: Grunt/RCA
- Producers: Grace Slick; David Freiberg; Paul Kantner; Keith Grant (co-producer); Steven Schuster (co-producer, score/arrangements)

Grace Slick chronology
Baron von Tollbooth & the Chrome Nun (1973)	Manhole (1974)	Dragon Fly (1974)

Manhole is the first solo album by Grace Slick, released in 1974 by Grunt/RCA Records.

== Background ==
After Jefferson Airplane completed its tour for Long John Silver in September 1972, the band went on hiatus. Three of its members, Paul Kantner, Grace Slick, and David Freiberg, collaborated on the album Baron von Tollbooth & the Chrome Nun, which was released in May 1973 and, like the previous Kantner/Slick collaborations Blows Against the Empire and Sunfighter, featured a host of guest stars from other West Coast acts like the Grateful Dead, Crosby, Stills, Nash & Young, and The Flying Burrito Brothers. After the completion of that album, Slick decided to embark on her first solo venture in early 1973 (the Airplane's five-year contract with RCA for Grunt Records in 1971 stipulated at least one Slick solo album), using much the same cast of characters that had just made Baron von Tollbooth only now under her own name.

== Songs and recording ==
Sessions for the album began in April 1973 at Wally Heider Studios in San Francisco, where most of the Airplane-related projects had been recorded since 1969. Kantner and Freiberg, her collaborators on Baron, acted as co-producers along with Keith Grant and orchestral arranger Steven Schuster. All the members who would form Jefferson Starship in 1974 performed on the album except for Papa John Creach, along with guests David Crosby, Gary Duncan, Jack Casady and famed jazz double bassist Ron Carter. The album was conceived as the soundtrack to an imaginary movie, noted by the title of the second track, "Theme from the Movie Manhole".

By this period Slick maintained a nighttime schedule so sessions were held in the evenings; on many occasions, according to engineer Bob Matthews, "she'd be up all one night and the next night wouldn't show up to the studio...so Paul and David would take over and do the work". Matthews observed that while previously in her career she had always been quite disciplined, known for her reliability in the studio, at this time "she was very much self-abused. She drank too much, smoked too much. She also shared my desire for particular drugs that kept us awake longer and allowed us to do more." Slick eventually began an affair with Matthews, and despite her erratic behavior he concluded that he enjoyed the entire time in the studio making the album.

Side one of the album opens with "Jay", a soft flamenco-influenced piece based on music Slick had written in 1965 for a student film made by her first husband Jerry at SFSU, with nonsense words meant to sound like Spanish. The second track, "Theme From The Movie Manhole", is a fifteen-minute, multi-sectional symphonic rock composition incorporating an even stronger Spanish influence and real lines sung in the language; according to Matthews, Slick would wait until six in the morning when the Mexican janitor appeared and then ask him to translate her words while he emptied garbage cans. When it came time to add orchestration, Slick had the recording team fly to London in June under Matthews' recommendation, booking three sessions at Olympic Studios with the London Symphony Orchestra. Orchestral arranger Steven Schuster claimed that Slick constantly changed her mind over what she wanted, originally working with a 12-piece orchestra until she began to ask for more pieces, eventually settling for 42; three different versions of the orchestration were eventually taped. Ultimately, the song's massive arrangement also featured herself on piano (with a left hand part she credited to her father Ivan), Craig Chaquico on lead guitar, Peter Kaukonen on mandolin, Kantner, Crosby and Freiberg on vocals, and both Jack Casady and Ron Carter on bass.

Whereas the music and lyrics on side one were entirely by Slick, the second side of the album largely featured music by Kantner and Freiberg, with some lyrical contributions by her. One song, "It's Only Music", unusually did not feature her in any capacity, being a Freiberg composition with words by Grateful Dead lyricist Robert Hunter that featured Quicksilver Messenger Service's Gary Duncan on lead guitar. The following "Better Lying Down" was a bawdy barrelhouse piano blues with music by Pete Sears and highly suggestive lyrics by Slick. The album's closing track, "Epic No. 38", was another symphonic progressive rock composition primarily written by Kantner with some lyrical input from Slick and Jack Traylor. As with the title track, the orchestral additions were arranged by Schuster and recorded at Olympic in London along with a line of eight bagpipes, the multi-sectional piece eventually climaxing on a lengthy Chaquico guitar solo. Craig later recounted that Slick would encourage him to turn up the volume and "make it ballsy...I was inspired by her vocals and sexy lyrics. I could really feed off her energy and ideas".

== Title and album cover ==
Slick drew all the artwork for the album, writing in the liner notes "Child Type Odd Art by Grace." The cover was a self-portrait of the artist displaying her new curly hairstyle, while the back cover was a portrait of the studio, with various characters sitting at the mixing desk watching an orchestra play through the window. The album also came packaged with an extensive booklet featuring psychedelic artwork, song lyrics, newspaper cut-outs, rambling prose, and a fictional ad for a "Grunt Record Eating Contest" which promised that "Nixon himself will present the awards by remote control from wherever he is at the time." Slick later explained that the title was a reaction to "women badgering me about women's liberation, so I was being very sarcastic and just calling myself a cunt. I assumed people would understand it and nobody did."

== Release and reception ==
Professional ratings
Review scores
Source	Rating
AllMusic	3/5 stars
Christgau's Record Guide	C

Manhole was released on January 4, 1974, with a full page ad in Billboard that announced "the voice that launched a thousand trips goes solo". It commercially underperformed, reaching No. 127 on the Billboard charts, the worst showing for any Airplane-related release since the 1966 debut. RCA, who had spent a lot of money on the record, were disappointed in the result. A single, "¿Come Again? Toucan" backed by a drastically edited three-minute version of the title track, failed to chart.

Critical reception was mixed. Billboard called it a "heady, ethereal effort, designed for people who like to listen to music which rambles on about topics which the audience cannot relate to. The musical effects are adventurous and Grace's voice is fine and powerful." By contrast, Robert Christgau at The Village Voice moaned that "she sounds tired, and for the most part this is as inflated as the worst Airplane." Retrospectively, Joe Viglione at AllMusic called it "an alien concoction, but it works on many levels as great head music" and concluded that "the music is wonderfully dense, macabre, exhilarating, and totally out there...Manhole is orchestrated psychedelia at its finest with the voice from "White Rabbit" stretching that concept across two sides."

== Track listing ==
Side one

No.	Title	Lyrics	Music	Length
1.	"Jay"	Grace Slick	Grace Slick	2:43
2.	"Theme from the Movie Manhole"	Grace Slick	Grace Slick (Note: Left hand piano part by Ivan Wing (Grace Slick's father))	15:23

Side two

No.	Title	Lyrics	Music	Length
1.	"¿Come Again? Toucan"	Grace Slick	David Freiberg	4:40
2.	"It's Only Music"	Robert Hunter	David Freiberg	4:32
3.	"Better Lying Down"	Grace Slick	Pete Sears	3:15
4.	"Epic No. 38"	Paul Kantner, Grace Slick, Jack Traylor	Paul Kantner	7:23

== Personnel ==
- Grace Slick – vocals on all tracks except "It's Only Music", rhythm guitar on "Jay", piano on "Theme from the Movie Manhole".
- Peter Kaukonen – bass on "Jay", lead acoustic guitar on "Jay", mandolin on "Theme from the Movie Manhole"
- Steven Schuster – orchestra arrangement on "Theme from the Movie Manhole" and "Epic No. 38"
- David Freiberg – vocals on "Theme from the Movie Manhole", "It's Only Music", and "Epic No. 38", rhythm guitar on "Theme from the Movie Manhole" and "¿Come Again? Toucan", piano on "¿Come Again? Toucan" and "It's Only Music", percussion on "¿Come Again? Toucan" and "It's Only Music", bass on "¿Come Again? Toucan" and "It's Only Music", organ on "It's Only Music", 12-string guitar on "It's Only Music"
- Paul Kantner – vocals on "Theme from the Movie Manhole", "It's Only Music", and "Epic No. 38", 12-string guitar on "It's Only Music", rhythm guitar on "Epic No. 38", glass harmonica on "Epic No. 38"
- David Crosby – vocals on "Theme from the Movie Manhole"
- Ron Carter – bass on "Theme from the Movie Manhole"
- Jack Casady – bass on "Theme from the Movie Manhole" and "It's Only Music"
- Craig Chaquico – lead guitar on "Theme from the Movie Manhole", "¿Come Again? Toucan", and "Epic No. 38"
- John Barbata – drums on "Theme from the Movie Manhole", "¿Come Again? Toucan", and "Epic No. 38"
- Gary Duncan – lead guitar on "It's Only Music"
- Pete Sears – piano on "Better Lying Down", bass on "Epic No. 38"
- Keith Grant – synthesizer programming on "Epic No. 38"
- London Symphony Orchestra – violins (John Georgiadis, Hans Geiger, Alan Traverse, Carlos Villa, Paul Scherman, Michael Jones, Jack Greenstone, John Ronayne, James Davis, Bernard Monshin, Fred Parrington, Denis McConnell), violas, (Kenneth Essex, John Coulling, John underwood, Alex Taylor), celli (Alan Dalziel, Bram Martin, Clive Anstee, Robin Firman), string basses (James Merrett, Keith Marjarom, Robin McGee, Chris Laurence), harp (David Snell), flutes (Jack Ellory, Chris Taylor), oboes (Terence Macdonagh, Philip Hill), bass clarinet (Frank Reidy), French horns (Andrew McGavin, Douglas Moore), trumpets (Michael Laird, George Whiting), bass trumpets (Raymond Premru, Harold Nash), bass trombone (Peter Harvey), guitar (Timothy Walker), percussion (Alan Hakin, Terence Emery, Eric Allen, Stan Barrett) on "Theme from the Movie Manhole"
- Iain MacDonald Murray, Calum Innes, Cohn Graham, Angus McTavish, Tom Duncan, Jack Scott, Angus MacKay, William Stewart – bagpipes on "Epic No. 38"

Production

- Grace Slick, David Freiberg, Paul Kantner – producers
- Keith Grant – co-producer, recording engineer, mixdown engineer
- Steven Schuster – co-producer
- Pat Ieraci (Maurice) – production coordinator
- Valeria Clausen, Mallory Earl, Bob Matthews – recording engineers
- Sidney Margo – orchestra contractor
- Recorded at Wally Heider's, San Francisco
- Mastered at the Lacquer Channel, Sausalito
