= Bill Thompson (talent manager) =

- Born: June 22, 1944; Oklahoma City, Oklahoma
- Died: January 12, 2015 (aged 70); Mill Valley, California
- Occupation: talent manager
- Known for: managing Jefferson Airplane and related bands and performers

William Carl Thompson (June 22, 1944 - January 12, 2015) was an American talent manager, most notable for managing the bands Hot Tuna, Jefferson Airplane, Jefferson Starship, and Starship, as well as the careers of their individual performers such as Grace Slick.

== Biography ==
Thompson was born in Oklahoma City on June 22, 1944, and attended high school and college in San Francisco, where he also worked as a copy boy for the San Francisco Chronicle. His roommate was Marty Balin, a founding member of Jefferson Airplane. Thompson initially served as the band's press agent, and eventually became their manager.

Thompson also managed other artists, such as Neal Schon, and served as a consultant to Polygram Records.

He died of a heart attack at his home in Mill Valley, California, on January 12, 2015, at the age of 70.
