= Baron von Tollbooth & the Chrome Nun =

Studio album by Paul Kantner, Grace Slick and David Freiberg
- Released: May 1973
- Recorded: November–December 1972 at Wally Heider Studios, San Francisco
- Genre: Progressive rock, psychedelic rock, art rock
- Length: 40:22
- Label: Grunt/RCA Records
- Producer: Paul Kantner; Grace Slick; David Freiberg

Paul Kantner chronology
Sunfighter (1971)	Baron von Tollbooth & the Chrome Nun (1973)	Dragon Fly (1974)

Grace Slick chronology
Sunfighter (1971)	Baron von Tollbooth & the Chrome Nun (1973)	Manhole (1974)

Baron von Tollbooth & the Chrome Nun is a collaborative studio album by Jefferson Airplane members Paul Kantner, Grace Slick, and David Freiberg, released in May 1973.

== Background ==
Jefferson Airplane had finished touring behind their latest album Long John Silver in the summer of 1972, from which recordings would be taken for the live album Thirty Seconds Over Winterland released the following year. The band then went on hiatus as Kantner, Slick and Frieberg began to collaborate on a new record at the end of 1972. This would be the third Kantner/Slick collaboration, after Kantner's 1970 release Blows Against the Empire (with "Jefferson Starship" receiving co-billing) and the duo's Sunfighter in 1971, with the addition of Freiberg (who had recently joined Jefferson Airplane as vocalist after spending time in Quicksilver Messenger Service) now expanding the duo to a trio. Although Jefferson Airplane was on hiatus, all the current members contributed to its recording in some capacity, along with future members of Jefferson Starship. At the time it was assumed that the Airplane would re-form the following year for a new album and tour, although it was becoming increasingly difficult to persuade bassist Jack Casady and guitarist Jorma Kaukonen of that proposition, as they began to concentrate more on their side project Hot Tuna and a shared love of speedskating.

== Songs and recording ==
Sessions began in November 1972 at San Francisco's Wally Heider Studios, where every Airplane and Airplane-related album had been recorded since 1969's Volunteers, with Kantner, Slick and Freiberg producing. All of the trio's then-fellow Jefferson Airplane members, John Barbata, Jack Casady, Papa John Creach, and Jorma Kaukonen, are featured on the album. Also appearing are David Crosby, Jerry Garcia, Mickey Hart, The Pointer Sisters, and Craig Chaquico (the future lead guitarist of Jefferson Starship). On most of the tracks, Jerry Garcia of the Grateful Dead plays lead guitar and Chris Ethridge of the Flying Burrito Brothers plays bass. Jack Traylor of the group Steelwind (whose lead guitarist was Chaquico), who were signed to the Airplane's label Grunt, contributed backing vocals on several tracks as well as lead vocals and guitar on his composition "Flowers of the Night."

The title for Slick's "Fat" came from her self-consciousness at being overweight as a child, and featured The Pointer Sisters on backing vocals. Meanwhile, her side two opener "Across The Board" slyly referenced "seven inches of pleasure", for which Slick later admitted "I was trying to gross out the record company or something. It's just an amusing thing on sex." Nonetheless, the track became a live favorite and vocal showcase in the early days of Jefferson Starship.

Kantner's "Your Mind Has Left Your Body" was the final studio track to feature Paul Kantner, Grace Slick, Jorma Kaukonen and Jack Casady until the 1989 Jefferson Airplane reunion album. The lyrics reference typical 1960's cosmic preoccupations, accentuated by the addition of Jerry Garcia on pedal steel guitar and Mickey Hart playing gongs and waterphone. The final track on the album, "Sketches of China", was inspired by the strong interest Kantner and Slick took in Chinese culture during this period, with the two learning White Crane Kung Fu; this interest would also manifest itself a year later in the Jefferson Starship track "Ride the Tiger".

Grace Slick recalled in her autobiography that after a short period of relative sobriety after the birth of her daughter China, by this time "the liquor crawled slowly back into my bloodstream." Craig Chaquico recalled the sessions fondly, remembering the excitement of trading guitar licks with Garcia on "Fishman" while stating "I didn't feel like a punk kid. Everyone I met through Paul and Grace...had this down-home friendly attitude, no bullshit, no star trips."

== Title and album cover ==
The album cover was illustrated by Drew Struzan. The psychedelic drawing features three human figures (presumably Kantner, Slick and Freiberg) stripped of their skin, leaving only muscle and bone, standing against a snow-capped mountain landscape with a leopard crouched in front. The inner sleeve features lyrics to the songs along with artwork which depicts part of the faces of the three artists overlapping three skull X-rays, while a special insert also features complete song credits.

The title of the album was taken from the nicknames David Crosby had given Paul Kantner and Grace Slick. As Slick later explained:

The gag name for Paul was Baron von Tollboth, because of the World War One fighter Baron von Richtoven. Paul is very German. He stands up very straight and he likes organization. I'm the Chrome Nun. She's modern, she's shiny, she's also very protective of herself--it's like having a suit of armor on. Nuns don't fool around.

== Release and reception ==
Professional ratings
Review scores
Source	Rating
AllMusic	2/5 stars
Rolling Stone	3/5 stars

Baron von Tollbooth & the Chrome Nun was released as Grunt BFL1-0148 in May 1973, at the same time as the final Jefferson Airplane album, the live Thirty Seconds Over Winterland. The album charted much more poorly than any prior Airplane or Kantner/Slick release, peaking at number 120 on Billboard.

Rolling Stone gave a negative review upon release, with reviewer Ben Gerson noting "No, unfortunately the contents of this album fit the caricature of the title. The intensity with which Kantner and Slick put forward their feelings and beliefs makes them that much more thunderingly irrelevant", although the title track and "Fat" (described as "focused as a laser") were praised as the best on the album. Retrospectively, William Rhulman at AllMusic opined that in spite of the assembled all-star cast of musicians, "Perhaps more outside songwriting should have been employed, since the compositions here were second-rate." Conversely, David Bowling of The Daily Vault gave it a B+ grade, stating "the music is strong and has a haunting and even beautiful quality to it. Meanwhile, the lyrics are philosophical and even playful in nature."

== Track listing ==
Side A
No.	Title	Lyrics	Music	Length
1.	"Ballad of the Chrome Nun"	Grace Slick	David Freiberg	3:59
2.	"Fat"	Slick	Slick	3:13
3.	"Flowers of the Night"	Jack Traylor	Traylor	4:13
4.	"Walkin'"	Kantner, Slick	Kantner	2:31
5.	"Your Mind Has Left Your Body"	Kantner	Kantner	5:45

Side B
No.	Title	Lyrics	Music	Length
1.	"Across the Board"	Slick	Slick	4:34
2.	"Harp Tree Lament"	Robert Hunter	Freiberg	3:34
3.	"White Boy (Transcaucasian Airmachine Blues)"	Kantner	Kantner	4:13
4.	"Fishman"	Slick	Slick	2:40
5.	"Sketches of China"	Kantner, Slick	Kantner	5:13

== Personnel ==
- Paul Kantner – vocals on all tracks except "Across the Board" and "Fishman", rhythm guitar on all tracks except "Across the Board" and "Fishman", glass harmonica on "Harp Tree Lament" and "White Boy"
- Grace Slick – vocals, piano on all tracks except "Ballad of the Chrome Nun", "Flowers of the Night", and "Harp Tree Lament"
- David Freiberg – vocals on all tracks except "Across the Board" and "Fishman", piano on "Ballad of the Chrome Nun", "Harp Tree Lament", keyboards on all other tracks except "Walkin'" and "Fishman"
- John Barbata – drums, percussion
- Chris Ethridge – bass on all tracks except "Your Mind Has Left Your Body", "White Boy" and "Fishman"
- Jerry Garcia – guitar on all tracks except "Flowers of the Night", "Your Mind Has Left Your Body", and "Harp Tree Lament", steel guitar on "Ballad of the Chrome Nun" and "Your Mind Has Left Your Body", banjo on "Walkin'"
- Craig Chaquico – lead guitar on "Ballad of the Chrome Nun", "Flowers of the Night", and "Fishman"
- David Crosby – vocals on "The Ballad of the Chrome Nun"
- Jack Traylor – acoustic guitar on "Flowers of the Night", vocals on "Flowers of the Night", "White Boy", and "Sketches of China"
- Jack Casady – bass on "Your Mind Has Left Your Body", "White Boy" and "Fishman"
- The Pointer Sisters – vocals on "Fat"
- Papa John Creach – electric violin on "Walkin'"
- Mickey Hart – gongs on "Your Mind Has Left Your Body" and "Sketches of China", water phones on "Your Mind Has Left Your Body"
- Jorma Kaukonen – lead guitar on "Your Mind Has Left Your Body"

=== Production ===
- Paul Kantner – producer
- Grace Slick – producer
- David Freiberg – producer
- Bob Matthews – recording engineer, mixdown engineer
- Betty Cantor – recording engineer, mixdown engineer
- Jim Gaines – recording engineer
- Al Schmitt – mixdown engineer
- Daggett – equipment head
- Drew Struzan, Bill Garland – illustrations
- Jim Marshall – eye photography
- Pacific Eye & Ear – album design
- Bill Thompson – management
