= Peter Kaukonen =

American musician (born 1945)

Peter Kaukonen (born Benson Lee Kaukonen on 23 September 1945) is an American guitarist, multi-instrumentalist and songwriter based in the San Francisco Bay Area. He is the younger brother of Jorma Kaukonen from Jefferson Airplane and Hot Tuna. Peter Kaukonen has played, toured, and recorded with Jefferson Airplane, Jefferson Starship, Hot Tuna, Johnny Winter, Link Wray, Terry Allen, Ruthann Friedman (author of "Windy"), as well as his own band, Black Kangaroo.

Kaukonen plays both acoustic and electric guitars, acoustic and electric bass, mandolin, bouzouki, lap steel guitar and piano. His influences are Chicago and Delta blues, fingerpicking guitar, New Age-style acoustic music, rock and roll, jazz and classical music.

Kaukonen's songwriting spans 40 years—from early power trio songs written for Black Kangaroo and covered by Jefferson Airplane to instrumental compositions. He attended Stanford University.

== Discography ==
with Black Kangaroo

- Black Kangaroo – Grunt Records FTR-1006 (1972)
- Black Kangaroo – Wounded Bird 106 (2007)
- "Prisoner" / "Dynamo Snackbar" – Grunt Records single 65-0507 (1972)
- "Up or Down" / "That's a Good Question" – Grunt Records single 65-0510 (1972)

Solo

- Going Home – Veldt 1001 (2004)
- Beyond Help – Veldt 1002 (2004)
- The Archives 1976 - 2006 – Veldt 1003 (2006)
- Traveller – Veldt 1004 (2007)
- Crazy Quilt (2017)

Guest appearances

- Blows Against the Empire – RCA Records LSP-4448 (by Paul Kantner and Jefferson Starship) (1970)
- Sunfighter – Grunt Records FTR-1001 (by Paul Kantner and Grace Slick) (1971)
- Be What You Want To – Polydor PD-5047 (by Link Wray) (1973)
- Manhole – Grunt Records BFL1-0347 (by Grace Slick) (1974)
- Juarez – Fate Records (by Terry Allen) (1975)
- Jefferson Airplane – Epic Records 90036 (by Jefferson Airplane) (1989)
