= Papa John Creach (album) =

Studio album by Papa John Creach
- Released: December 1971
- Recorded: 1971 at Wally Heider Studios, San Francisco and Los Angeles
- Genre: Rock, psychedelic rock, blues rock
- Label: Grunt/RCA
- Producer: Papa John Creach; Mike Lipskin (asst.)

Papa John Creach chronology
Papa John Creach (1971)	Filthy! (1972)

Professional ratings
Review scores
Source	Rating
Allmusic	4.5/5 stars

Papa John Creach is Papa John Creach's first solo album. All the members of Jefferson Airplane also make appearances on the album along with members of the Grateful Dead, Quicksilver Messenger Service, Santana, and Tower of Power.

== Track listing ==
=== Side One ===
1. "The Janitor Drives a Cadillac" (Joey Covington) – 2:47
2. "St. Louis Blues" (W.C. Handy) – 4:36
3. "Papa John's Down Home Blues" (Papa John Creach, Roger Spotts) – 2:31
4. "Plunk a Little Funk" (Creach) – 5:11
5. "Over the Rainbow" (Harold Arlen, E.Y. Harburg) – 3:26

=== Side Two ===
1. "String Jet Rock" (Creach) – 3:46
2. "Danny Boy" (Traditional) – 3:58
3. "Human Spring" (James Reese, Roger Spotts) – 2:52
4. "Soul Fever" (Miles Grayson) – 4:10
5. "Every Time I Hear Her Name" (Roger Spotts) – 4:49

== Personnel ==
- Papa John Creach – electric violin, vocals
- Greg Adams – trumpet on "The Janitor Drives a Cadillac"
- Rufus Anderson – guitar on "Human Spring"
- Jack Bonus – saxophone on "The Janitor Drives a Cadillac" and "St. Louis Blues"
- Nick Buck – piano on "Papa John's Down Home Blues"
- Dave Brown – bass on "Soul Fever"
- Jack Casady – bass on "Plunk a Little Funk", "String Jet Rock", and "Every Time I Hear Her Name"
- John Cipollina – guitar on "The Janitor Drives a Cadillac"
- Bruce Conte – guitar on "Papa John's Down Home Blues"
- Joey Covington – drums on "The Janitor Drives a Cadillac" and "Soul Fever", congas on "Plunk a Little Funk"
- Jerry Garcia – guitar on "Soul Fever"
- Mic Gillette – trombone on "The Janitor Drives a Cadillac"
- Bobby Haynes – bass on "Danny Boy" and "Human Spring"
- Art Hillery – piano on "Over the Rainbow" and "Human Spring", organ on "Danny Boy"
- Paul Kantner – rhythm guitar on "String Jet Rock"
- Jorma Kaukonen – guitar on "Plunk a Little Funk", "String Jet Rock", and "Every Time I Hear Her Name"
- Mike Lipskin – organ on "The Janitor Drives a Cadillac", piano on "St. Louis Blues"
- Stan Monteiro – clarinet on "St. Louis Blues"
- Skip Olsen – bass on "St. Louis Blues"
- Sammy Piazza – drums on "St. Louis Blues", "Plunk a Little Funk", "String Jet Rock", and "Every Time I Hear Her Name"
- Douglas Rauch – bass on "Papa John's Down Home Blues"
- Gregg Rolie – organ on "Soul Fever"
- Carlos Santana – guitar on "Papa John's Down Home Blues"
- Peter Sears – bass on "The Janitor Drives a Cadillac"
- Grace Slick – vocals on "The Janitor Drives a Cadillac"
- Tony Smith – drums on "Papa John's Down Home Blues"
- Bob Wilson – guitar on "St. Louis Blues"
- Los Angeles String Section – strings on "Over the Rainbow"
- Los Angeles Brass Section – brass on "Human Spring" and "Every Time I Hear Her Name"

== Production ==
- Papa John Creach – producer, arranger
- Roger Hamilton Spotts – arranger
- Mike Lipskin – production assistant
- Ken Hopkins – engineer, mixing engineer
- Peter Granet – engineer
- Bruce Steinberg – photography
- Bill Thompson, Acy Lehman – design, concept
- Recorded at Wally Heider's Recording Studios, San Francisco & Los Angeles
