= Sunfighter =

Studio album by Paul Kantner and Grace Slick
- Released: November 1971
- Recorded: 1971
- Studios: Wally Heider, San Francisco
- Genres: Rock; Psychedelic rock
- Length: 41:48
- Label: Grunt/RCA
- Producers: Paul Kantner; Grace Slick

Paul Kantner chronology
Blows Against the Empire (1970)	Sunfighter (1971)	Baron von Tollbooth & the Chrome Nun (1973)

Grace Slick chronology
Sunfighter (1971)	Baron von Tollbooth & the Chrome Nun (1973)

Professional ratings
Review scores
Source	Rating
Allmusic	3/5 stars
Christgau's Record Guide	C

Sunfighter is a 1971 album created by Paul Kantner and Grace Slick from Jefferson Airplane. The album was released shortly after the Airplane album Bark was released, and is the second record released on the Airplane's own Grunt vanity label, distributed by RCA Records. The album features a picture of their baby daughter, China Wing Kantner, on the cover. Many Bay Area musicians perform on the album, including all of the then current lineup of Jefferson Airplane, members of the Grateful Dead, Crosby, Stills, and Nash, and the horn group, Tower of Power. This album is also the first time a 17-year old Craig Chaquico recorded with Paul Kantner and Grace Slick. He would go on to become the lead guitarist for Jefferson Starship.

== Dedications ==
The song "Sunfighter" is dedicated to Marty Balin, who had formed Jefferson Airplane with Kantner.

== Inspirations ==
Part 1 of the song "Diana" was written in response to the story of Diana Oughton and the Weathermen. Part 2 is a response to the Ohio National Guard's mass shooting of students at Kent State University the previous year.

The song "Silver Spoon" concerns cannibalism. According to the liner notes, Grace Slick, now a vegan, conceived of the song out of frustration with pressure from vegetarian neighbors in Bolinas, California, where she and Kantner had recently moved.

The song "China" is about their new daughter, China Kantner. Her picture is used on the cover of the album.

== Track listing ==
Side One
No.	Title	Writer(s)	Length
1.	"Silver Spoon"	Grace Slick	5:40
2.	"Diana"	Paul Kantner, Slick	0:52
3.	"Sunfighter"	Kantner	3:50
4.	"Titanic"	Phill Sawyer	2:25
5.	"Look at the Wood"	Slick, Kantner	2:08
6.	"When I Was a Boy I Watched the Wolves"	Kantner, Slick	4:59

Side Two
No.	Title	Writer(s)	Length
1.	"Million"	Kantner	4:02
2.	"China"	Slick	3:17
3.	"Earth Mother"	Jack Traylor	3:16
4.	"Diana 2"	Kantner, Slick	1:01
5.	"Universal Copernican Mumbles"	Pat Gleeson, John Vierra, Kantner	2:03
6.	"Holding Together"	Slick, Kantner	7:40

== Charts ==
Chart (1972)	Peak position
Billboard Pop Albums	89
Australia (Kent Music Report)	45

== Personnel ==
- Paul Kantner – vocals, rhythm guitar
- Grace Slick – vocals, piano
- Jack Traylor – guitar on "Earth Mother", vocals on "Earth Mother"
- Jerry Garcia – guitar on "When I Was a Boy I Watched the Wolves", "Million", and "Holding Together"
- Papa John Creach – electric violin on "Silver Spoon" and "Earth Mother"
- Craig Chaquico – lead guitar on "Earth Mother"
- Bill Laudner – vocals on "Million"
- Jack Casady – bass on "Silver Spoon" and "China"
- Spencer Dryden – drums on "Earth Mother"
- David Crosby – vocals on "Look at the Wood", "When I Was a Boy I Watched the Wolves", and "Diana 2", tambourine on "Look at the Wood"
- Jorma Kaukonen – lead guitar on "Look at the Wood"
- Graham Nash – Vocals on "Look at the Wood", "When I Was a Boy I Watched the Wolves", and "Diana 2", ARP synthesizer on "Diana 2"
- Chris Wing – drums on "China"
- Pat Gleeson – moog on "Universal Copernican Mumbles", piano on "Universal Copernican Mumbles"
- John Vierra – synthesizer on "Universal Copernican Mumbles", keyboards on "Universal Copernican Mumbles"
- Phill Sawyer – sound effects on "Titanic"
- Peter Kaukonen – guitar on "Sunfighter", mandolin on "When I Was a Boy I Watched the Wolves"
- Shelley Silverman – drums on "When I Was a Boy I Watched the Wolves"
- Joey Covington – drums on "Silver Spoon", "Sunfighter", "China", and "Holding Together"
- Edwin Hawkins Singers (Edwin Hawkins, Walter Hawkins, Tramaine Davis Hawkins, Elaine Kelley, Norma J. King, Barbara Gill, Ruth Wyons, Daphne Henderson, Shirley Miller, Eddie Bayers) – vocals on "Sunfighter"
- Steven Schuster – flute on "Silver Spoon" and "Sunfighter", saxophone on "Sunfighter" and "China", horn arrangements on "Sunfighter", and "China"
- Tower of Power (Greg Adams, Mic Gillette) – horns on "Sunfighter" and "China"

Production

- Paul Kantner – producer
- Grace Slick – producer, libretto booklet
- Pat Ieraci (Maurice the Miracle Man) – engineer
- Phill Sawyer – engineer
- Acy Lehman – cover, assistant on libretto booklet
- Heavy Water Lights (Mary Ann Mayer, Joan Chase) – lights inside
- Gary Blackman – assistant on libretto booklet
