= Blows Against the Empire =

1970 studio album by Paul Kantner and Jefferson Starship

Studio album by Paul Kantner and Jefferson Starship
- Released: October 31, 1970
- Recorded: Summer–fall 1970
- Studios: Pacific High (San Francisco), Wally Heider (San Francisco)
- Genres: Folk rock, progressive rock, acid rock, psychedelic rock
- Length: 41:41
- Label: RCA Victor LSP-4448
- Producer: Paul Kantner

Paul Kantner chronology
Blows Against the Empire (1970)	Sunfighter (1971)

Blows Against the Empire is a concept album by Paul Kantner, released in 1970 under the name Paul Kantner and Jefferson Starship. It is the first album to use the "Starship" moniker, a name which Kantner and Grace Slick would later use for the band Jefferson Starship that emerged after Jack Casady and Jorma Kaukonen left Jefferson Airplane. From a commercial standpoint, it performed comparably to Jefferson Airplane albums of the era, peaking at No. 20 on the Billboard 200 and receiving a RIAA gold certification. It was the second album to be nominated for a Hugo Award in the category of Best Dramatic Presentation.

== Overview ==
Beginning in 1965, Paul Kantner had recorded five studio albums with Jefferson Airplane, but by 1970 internal problems had begun taking their toll on the band, including the departure of drummer Spencer Dryden in 1970 and a rift that was forming between founder Marty Balin and the rest of the band that would eventually result in Balin's departure from the band in April 1971.

The group released only one single in 1970, and Kantner took advantage of the hiatus to work on a solo album. Blows Against the Empire is his concept album recorded and released in 1970, credited to Paul Kantner and Jefferson Starship. This marks the debut of the Jefferson Starship moniker, though not of the band of that name itself, since Blows predates the actual formation of the band Jefferson Starship by four years.

The album was recorded at Pacific High Recording Studios and Wally Heider Recording Studios in San Francisco. The result derives from a period of cross-collaboration during late 1969 through 1971 by a collection of musicians from various San Francisco bands including Jefferson Airplane, the Grateful Dead, and Quicksilver Messenger Service, along with Crosby, Stills, Nash & Young recording at the time in the city. These musicians included Jack Casady, Joey Covington, David Crosby, David Freiberg, Jerry Garcia, Mickey Hart, Paul Kantner, Bill Kreutzmann, Graham Nash, and Grace Slick. Excepting Covington, all of these musicians would also play or sing on Crosby's debut album recorded at the same time in the same studios. Bassist Harvey Brooks of Electric Flag, and guitarist Peter Kaukonen, brother of Airplane guitarist Jorma Kaukonen, also appear.

Stylistically, the songs range from the light folk of "The Baby Tree", the musique concrète passages of "Home" and "XM", and proto-grunge in "Mau-Mau (Amerikon)". Mostly, however, the songs are delivered in the kind of improvised, free-form rock & roll representative of the Bay Area bands of the day. Lyrically, the album celebrates countercultural idealism; it is set in a future where the counterculture is able to unite and decide their own fate far away from planet Earth. Written in 1970, Kantner describes in "Hijack" the construction of a starship beginning in 1980, which "ought to be ready by 1990".

== Concept ==
The credit to Jefferson Starship reflected many things: the ad hoc all-star line-up; the album being an evolutionary progression from Jefferson Airplane; and finally the story it relates of the hijacking of a starship. The album is a narrative concept album that tells the story of a counter-culture revolution against the oppressions of "Uncle Samuel" and a plan to steal a starship from orbit and journey into space in search of a new home. The original vinyl release is divided into two album sides. "Mau Mau (Amerikon)" launched Side One, a counter-culture manifesto and call to arms. In the context of the narrative, this is the free music being performed in the park, drawing everyone together.

"Put your old ladies back into bed,
Put your old men into their graves,
Cover their ears so they can't hear us sing,
Cover their eyes so they can't see us play."

"Get out of the way, let the people play,
We gotta get down on you,
Come alive all over you,
Dancing down, into your town."

It celebrates late-sixties counter-culture, depicting people celebrating mind expansion and free love, "We'll ball in your parks, insane with the flash of living...calling for acid, cocaine and grass." They've had enough of the military, domestic and abroad, and make one of the earliest references to Ronald Reagan in popular music in the line, "You unleash the dogs of a grade-B movie star Governor's war...so drop your fuckin' bombs, burn your demon babies, I will live again!" They condemn the divisive strictures of conservative society, and dream of finding a Utopia.

"The Baby Tree", written by Rosalie Sorrels, is about an imaginary island where babies grow on trees and are collected by happy couples when they fall. The scene develops over the remaining album side, in "Let's Go Together" and "A Child Is Coming", that a couple is among the gathering in a park outside Chicago the night before the hijacking, tripping on acid as dawn approaches. She reveals that she's pregnant, and predictably they resolve to free their child from the government's "files and their numbers game" by joining the hijackers. In this setting, "The Baby Tree" can be seen as their acid-induced daydream about pregnancy, and so fits neatly into the narrative. The allegory of "Let's Go Together" and "A Child Is Coming" symbolizes Paul Kantner and Grace Slick's romantic relationship and Slick's pregnancy by Kantner, which would result in the birth of their daughter, China Kantner, the following year.

Side two is an integrated suite of songs which opens with "Sunrise", Grace Slick's allegory describing the breaking dawn the couple was awaiting, while also symbolizing the dawn of a Utopian civilization, freed from conservative mores and violent influences. "Sunrise" leads directly into "Hijack", in which the revolutionaries storm the transport to the orbiting starship and head off into space, boarding the ship by the end of "Hijack" and leaving orbit in "Home". As the story progresses with "Have You Seen the Stars Tonite", hopes and misgivings are revealed. After the ship's engines and systems are readied in "X-M", "Starship" relates a mutiny fought for control of the ship, to determine whether to surrender and return, or to continue. Eventually the idealists win control, and the ship is flung by gravity sling-shot around the Sun and out of the Solar System.

By Kantner's admission, the underlying premise of the narrative was derived in part from the works of science fiction author Robert A. Heinlein. In Heinlein's novel Methuselah's Children, a group of people hijack a starship. In the song "Mau Mau (Amerikon)" Kantner quotes a line from the novel where the hijackers turn on the ship's drive. At this point the main character of the novel, Lazarus Long says "Push the button, pull the switch, cut the beam, make it march."

Kantner went so far as to write to Heinlein to obtain permission to use his ideas. Heinlein wrote back that over the years many people had used his ideas, but Paul was the first one to ask for permission, which he granted. In 1971, Blows was the first rock album ever nominated for a Hugo Award in the category of Best Dramatic Presentation. Although it received the plurality of the vote among the five nominated works, the majority of voters elected not to issue the award that year.

== Arrangements and instrumentation ==
Throughout the album, Slick's acoustic piano is highlighted. She has said that her chord-heavy technique at the time developed from watching session player Nicky Hopkins during his many recordings with the Airplane. Most of the tracks add standard rock instrumentation to her piano, including electric and acoustic guitars, drums and bass. Thick vocal harmonies backing Kantner and Slick in duet are a signature quality of many of the songs.

A notable exception is "The Baby Tree", which has Kantner singing to a solo banjo accompaniment by Jerry Garcia. "Sunrise" is Grace Slick's self-penned solo vocal showcase, in part a duet with herself thanks to multitracking. Here she is predominantly accompanied by Jack Casady playing bass in a series of overdubs. "Have You Seen the Stars Tonite?" features lush vocal harmonies over acoustic instruments with subdued electric guitar overlays. The acoustic parts throughout the second side are centered on Kantner's detuned 12-string guitar, using a tuning consisting of octaves and fifths of open C, which David Crosby has likened to the droning tones of bagpipes.

Two tracks of the side 2 suite consist entirely of sound effects simulating the starship engines and the flight through space. Scattered among the other songs of the Suite are heavily processed background vocal tracks and sound bites. During the hijack scene, an audio excerpt from the 1953 George Pal film version of War of the Worlds is used: a woman is heard to call out "Let me through!" followed immediately by the sound of a ray gun firing.

== Release ==
The original vinyl album was a single platter in a gatefold sleeve. The cover featured a piece of Russian folk art from a painted lacquer box, attributed to CCCP (U.S.S.R. in Russian). Kantner said he enjoyed stealing the art from Russia because many Jefferson Airplane albums were bootlegged on the Russian black market. The back cover painting depicts a partially opened parcel revealing a room inside with Jerry Garcia peeking out. Behind him is a naked woman standing on an American Flag. The parcel is being carried aloft on a string by a trio of breasts with wings. Inside the gatefold is more artwork with track listings and credits, done in silver ink on black background and featuring a Paul Kantner caricature with a head of marijuana-leaf hair rising over a mountainous planetscape and inkblot pair of marijuana leaves in the lower fold. A mushroom on the left hemi-sphere pyramid on the right and the mountainous planetscape is nearly a mirror image. The inner dust jacket was decorated with collages of musician photos, writings and doodles. Original pressings included a full-color booklet as well, with lyrics, poetry and drawings mostly done by Slick during the recording sessions and collected daily by Kantner. Subsequent pressings included a black & white version of the booklet. A small number of promotional copies of the album were released to radio stations on clear translucent vinyl; these are now coveted by vinyl record collectors.

=== Compact disc reissues ===
The original compact disc release reproduced the gatefold cover art and parts of the inner gatefold, neglecting the booklet and dust jacket art. The fold-out CD booklet includes the cover art and provides much of the inner gatefold and dust jacket artwork by including it among the extensive liner notes. Also included is a CD-sized reproduction of the black & white booklet. The remaster includes bonus tracks of alternate takes, demos and a live recording of Starship with radio promos appended. The editing glitch at 4:00 in the opening song, "Mau Mau (Amerikon)", is not an error in the digital transfer; it goes back to the original album release.

=== Vinyl reissues ===
Z2 Comics announced a graphic novel called Jefferson Starship: Blows Against the Empire to be released in March 2022. Deluxe and super deluxe editions include a limited edition Blows Against The Empire LP on colored vinyl.

== Reception ==
Reviewing in Christgau's Record Guide: Rock Albums of the Seventies (1981), Robert Christgau found Kantner's singing and melodies "murky" while believing, "for all the record's sci-fi pretensions (does Philip K. Dick actually like this stuff?) it never even gets off the ground." He graded it a C-plus. It was voted number 850 in the third edition of Colin Larkin's All Time Top 1000 Albums (2000). In The Rolling Stone Album Guide (2004), Paul Evans said while its experimental quality may have impressed in 1970, the album "now suffers from concept-album creakiness". William Ruhlmann was more enthusiastic, writing in his review for AllMusic, "Kantner employed often dense instrumentation and complex arrangements", he wrote, "but there were enough hooks and harmonies to keep things interesting."

== Track listing ==
Side one
No.	Title	Writer(s)	Length
1.	"Mau Mau (Amerikon)"	Paul Kantner, Grace Slick, Joey Covington	6:33
2.	"The Baby Tree"	Rosalie Sorrels	1:42
3.	"Let's Go Together^{A}"	Paul Kantner	4:11
4.	"A Child Is Coming"	Paul Kantner, Grace Slick, David Crosby	6:15
Total length:			18:41

Side two
No.	Title	Writer(s)	Length
1.	"Sunrise"	Grace Slick	1:54
2.	"Hijack"	Paul Kantner, Grace Slick, Marty Balin, Gary Blackman	8:18
3.	"Home"	Paul Kantner, Phill Sawyer, Graham Nash	0:37
4.	"Have You Seen the Stars Tonite?"	Paul Kantner, David Crosby	3:42
5.	"X-M"	Paul Kantner, Phill Sawyer, Jerry Garcia, Mickey Hart	1:22
6.	"Starship"	Paul Kantner, Grace Slick, Marty Balin, Gary Blackman	7:07
Total length:			23:00

Remastered CD bonus tracks
No.	Title	Writer(s)	Length
11.	"Let's Go Together^{B}" (alternate lyrics)	Paul Kantner	4:22
12.	"Sunrise" (acoustic demo)	Grace Slick	1:21
13.	"Hijack" (acoustic demo)	Paul Kantner	7:02
14.	"SFX" (raw sound effects for X-M)	Paul Kantner, Sawyer, Jerry Garcia, Mickey Hart	2:04
15.	"Starship" (Jefferson Airplane live, recorded September 14, 1970 at Fillmore West)	Paul Kantner, Grace Slick, Marty Balin, Gary Blackman	10:07
16.	"Radio Spots" (hidden track)		2:57

Notes

^A^BThe original cassette and compact disc releases contained alternate lyrics for "Let's Go Together" that differed from the vinyl version. The 2005 reissue restored the original lyrics as track three and included the alternate lyric version as a bonus track.

== Personnel ==
- Paul Kantner – vocals, electric and acoustic guitars, banjo, bass machine
- Grace Slick – vocals, piano
- Jerry Garcia – banjo on "Let's Go Together" and "The Baby Tree"; pedal steel guitar on "Have You Seen the Stars Tonite"; sound effects and vocals on "XM"; lead guitar on "Starship"
- David Crosby – vocals and guitar on "A Child Is Coming" and "Have You Seen the Stars Tonite"; backing vocals on "Mau Mau" and "Starship"
- Peter Kaukonen – lead guitar on "Mau Mau"
- Jack Casady – bass on "A Child Is Coming" and "Sunrise"
- Harvey Brooks – bass on "Starship"
- Joey Covington – drums and vocals on "Mau Mau"; congas on "Hijack"
- Bill Kreutzmann – drums on "Let's Go Together"
- Graham Nash – congas on "Hijack"; sound effects on "Home"; backing vocals on "Starship"
- Mickey Hart – percussion on "Have You Seen the Stars Tonite"; sound effects and vocals on "XM"
- David Freiberg – backing vocals on "Starship"
- Phill Sawyer – sound effects on "Home" and "XM"

== Production ==
- Paul Kantner – producer, design
- CCCP – cover
- Patti Landres – books
- Jim Goldberg – space, design, all the work
- Tony Nagamuma – title
- Allen Zentz, Pat Ieraci, Graham Nash, David Crosby, Phill Sawyer, Bob Shoemaker – engineers
- Thanks to Kurt Vonnegut, Robert A. Heinlein, Michael Cooney, Jean Genet, Mike Lipskin, Buckminster Fuller, Theodore Sturgeon, A. A. Milne, John Lear and The Bear – James Boyd, thanks

== Charts ==
Chart (1970–71)	Peak position
Canada Top Albums/CDs (RPM)	28
UK Albums (Official Charts)	12
US Billboard 200	20

== See also ==
- Ronald Reagan in music
