= Grace Slick =

American painter and musician (born 1939)

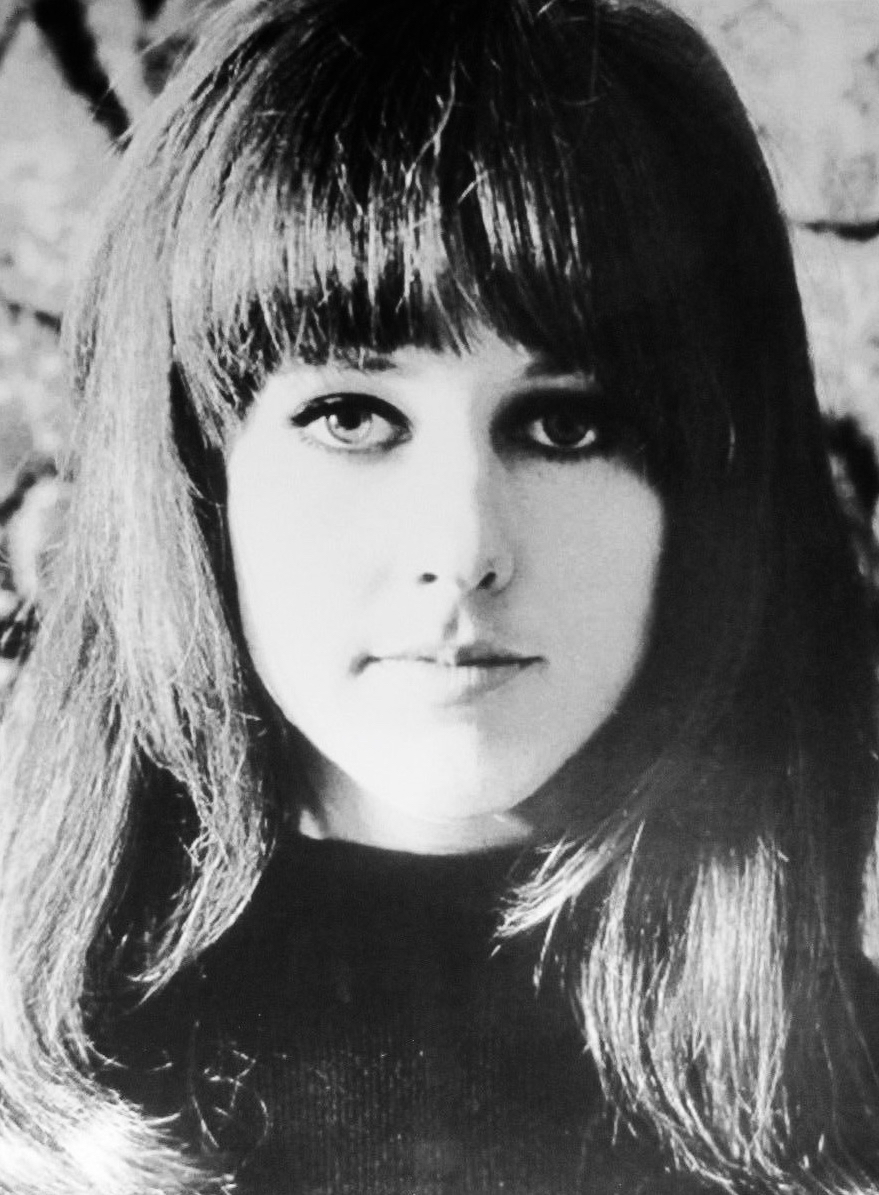
- Slick, c. 1967
- Born: Grace Barnett Wing; October 30, 1939 (age 87); Highland Park, Illinois, U.S.
- Other names: Gracie; The Chrome Nun; The Acid Queen
- Occupations: Painter; musician (retired)
- Years active: 1964–1990 (music career); 1995–present (painting career)
- Musical career
- Genres: Psychedelic rock; progressive rock; blues rock; pop
- Instruments: Vocals; keyboards; recorder
- Label: RCA
- Formerly of: The Great Society; Jefferson Airplane; Jefferson Starship; Starship; Hot Tuna
- Spouses: Gerald "Jerry" Slick (m. 1961; div. 1971); Skip Johnson (m. 1976; div. 1994)
- Website: graceslick.com

Grace Slick (born Grace Barnett Wing; October 30, 1939) is an American singer and songwriter, best known for being the lead vocalist of the American psychedelic rock band Jefferson Airplane. She was a prominent figure in San Francisco's psychedelic music scene during the mid-1960s to the early 1970s.

Initially performing with the Great Society, Slick achieved fame as the lead singer and front woman of Jefferson Airplane and its spinoff bands Jefferson Starship and Starship. Slick and Jefferson Airplane achieved significant success and popularity with their 1967 studio album Surrealistic Pillow, which included the top-ten US Billboard hits "White Rabbit" and "Somebody to Love".

With Starship, she sang co-lead for two number-one hits, "We Built This City" and "Nothing's Gonna Stop Us Now". She has released four studio albums as an independent artist. Slick retired from music in 1990, but continues to be active in visual arts. In 1996, Slick was inducted into the Rock and Roll Hall of Fame as a member of Jefferson Airplane.

== Early life and education ==
Grace Barnett Wing was born on October 30, 1939, in Chicago, to Ivan Wing, an investment banker, and Virginia Barnett Wing, a retired singer. Her parents met while they were both students at the University of Washington in Seattle. In 1949, her younger brother Chris was born.

Her father's work required the family to relocate to San Francisco, and then Palo Alto. Wing attended Palo Alto Senior High School, then transferred to Castilleja School, a private all-girls school in Palo Alto. Despite not being academically gifted, she attended Finch College in New York City from 1957 to 1958, and the University of Miami from 1958 to 1959, majoring in art.

After graduating, Slick worked as a model at an I. Magnin department store for three years. She also started composing music, including a contribution to a short film by her husband, Jerry Slick.

== Music career ==
=== 1965–1966: The Great Society ===
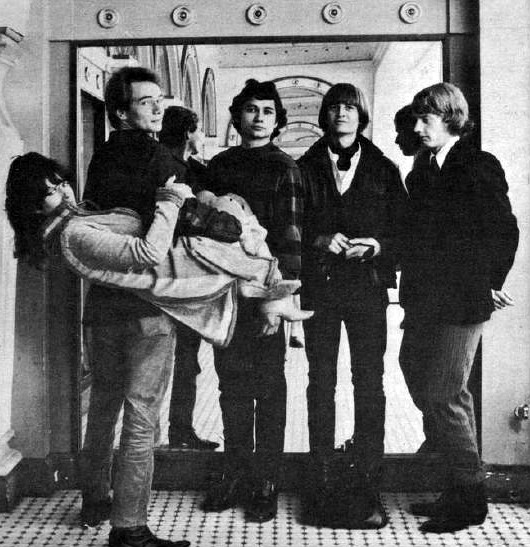
The Great Society in 1965: Grace is carried by her then-husband, Jerry Slick. His brother, Darby Slick, is at right.

In August 1965, Slick read an article in the San Francisco Chronicle about the newly formed Jefferson Airplane. Despite being situated in the growing musical center of San Francisco, Slick only half-heartedly considered music for a profession until she watched the band live at The Matrix. As a result, Slick (vocals, guitar), accompanied by husband Jerry Slick (drums), Jerry's brother Darby Slick (lead guitar), and David Miner (bass guitar) formed a group called the Great Society. On October 15, 1965, the band made its debut performance at a venue known as the Coffee Gallery. Soon after, Slick composed the psychedelic piece "White Rabbit". The song, which she is purported to have written in an hour, is a reflection on the hallucinogenic effects of psychedelic drugs; when performed live, it featured a speedier tempo and was an instant favorite among the band's followers.

Although Slick was an equal contributor to the Great Society's original material, Darby Slick pushed the band toward becoming a raga-influenced psychedelic act. By late 1965, they had become a popular attraction in the Bay Area. Between October and December 1965, the Great Society entered Golden State Recorders and recorded several tracks under the supervision of Sly Stone. One single emerged from the demos, the Darby Slick-penned "Somebody to Love", the "B" side to "Free Advice", on the locally based Autumn Records subsidiary label "North Beach". Grace Slick supplied vocals, guitar, piano, and recorder.

Also during Slick's Great Society period, she was responsible for her friend, Jeannie Piersol picking up singing experience.

=== 1966–1972: Jefferson Airplane ===
In late 1966, Jefferson Airplane's singer Signe Toly Anderson decided to leave the band to raise her child, and Jack Casady asked Slick to join them. Slick stated that she joined the Airplane because it was run in a professional manner, unlike the Great Society. With Slick on board, Jefferson Airplane began recording new music, and they turned in a more psychedelic direction than their former folk-rock style. Surrealistic Pillow included new recordings of "White Rabbit" and "Somebody to Love", both of which became top 10 singles.

Jefferson Airplane became one of the most popular bands in the country, and through it Slick rose to a position of prominence among female rock musicians of her time. In 1968, Slick performed "Crown of Creation" on The Smothers Brothers Comedy Hour in blackface and ended the performance with a Black Panther raised fist.

=== 1974–1984: Jefferson Starship and solo career ===
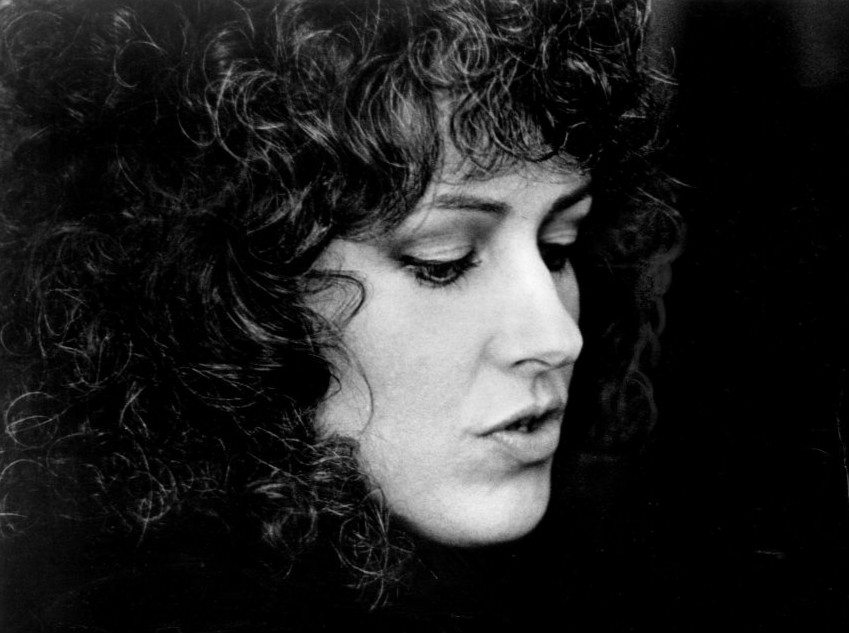
Slick in 1976

After Jack Casady and Jorma Kaukonen decided to leave Jefferson Airplane to focus on their project Hot Tuna, Slick formed Jefferson Starship with Paul Kantner and other bandmates, and also began a string of solo albums with Manhole, followed by Dreams, Welcome to the Wrecking Ball!, and Software. Manhole also featured keyboardist/bassist Pete Sears, who joined Jefferson Starship in 1974. Sears and Slick penned several early Jefferson Starship songs together, including "Hyperdrive" and "Play On Love". Dreams, which was produced by Ron Frangipane and incorporated many of the ideas Slick encountered attending twelve-step program meetings, is the most personal of her solo albums, and was nominated for a Grammy Award.

Slick was nicknamed "The Chrome Nun" by David Crosby, who also used the nickname "Baron von Tollbooth" for Kantner. Their nicknames appear as the title of an album she made in 1973 with bandmates Kantner and David Freiberg: Baron von Tollbooth & the Chrome Nun.

=== 1984–1989: Starship and Jefferson Airplane reunion ===
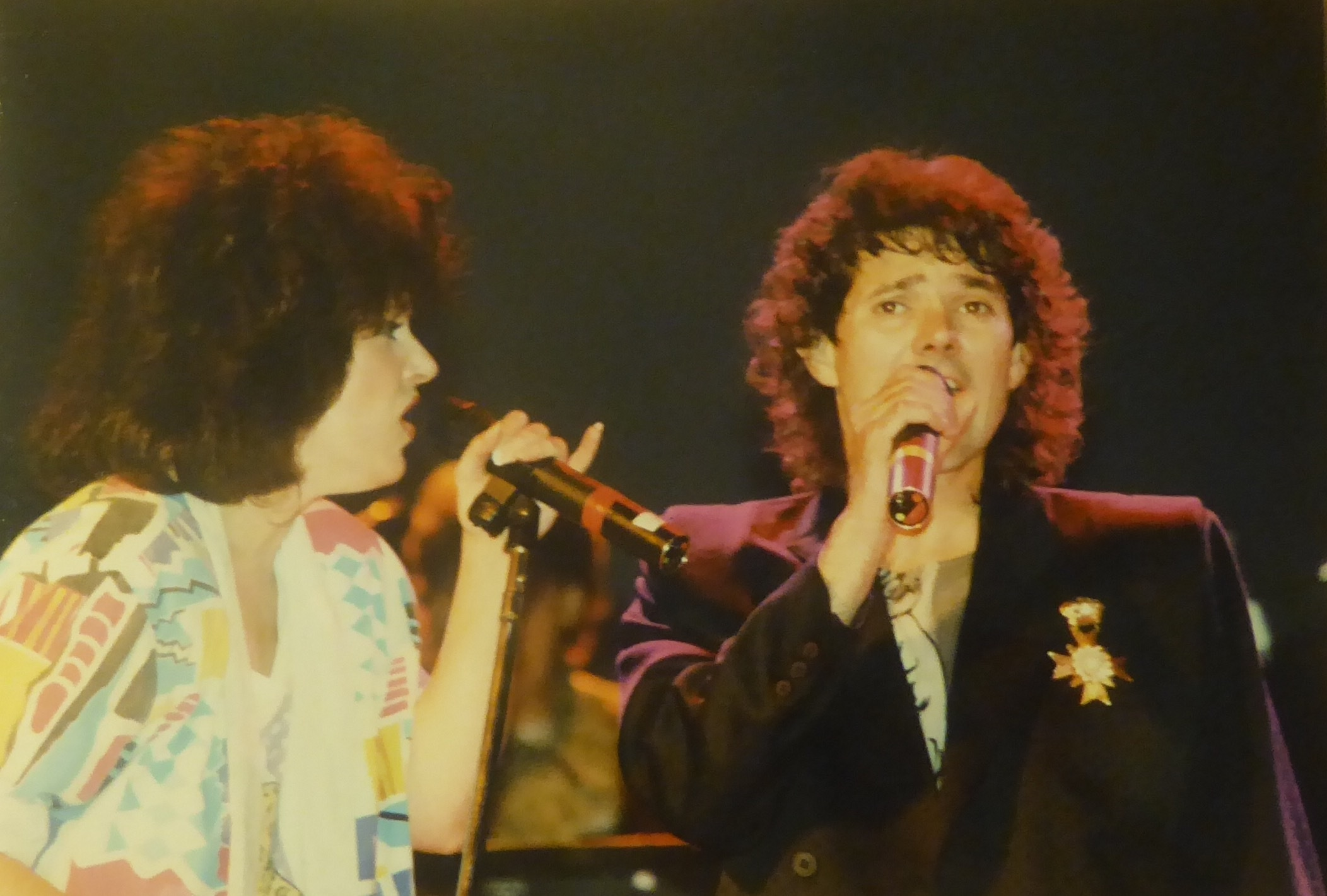
Grace Slick and Mickey Thomas onstage in 1985

During the 1980s, while Slick was the only member remaining from Jefferson Airplane in Starship, the band went on to score three chart-topping successes with "We Built This City", "Sara", and "Nothing's Gonna Stop Us Now", which received a big boost from being featured in the movie Mannequin. Despite the success, Slick since has spoken negatively about the experience and the music. In 1987, Slick co-hosted The Legendary Ladies of Rock & Roll, for which she also sang backing vocals on "Be My Baby" and "Da Doo Ron Ron". She left Starship in 1988, shortly after the release of No Protection.

In 1989, Slick and her former Jefferson Airplane band members reformed the group. They released a self-titled reunion album, and held a successful tour before disbanding.

=== 1990–present: Retirement ===
Grace Slick, 2010-01-25

Following the Jefferson Airplane reunion, Slick retired from the music business. During a 1998 interview with VH1 on a Behind the Music documentary featuring Jefferson Airplane, Slick, who was never shy about discussing getting old, said that the main reason she retired from the music business was that "all rock-and-rollers over the age of 50 look stupid and should retire". In a 2007 interview, she reiterated: "You can do jazz, classical, blues, opera, country until you're 150, but rap and rock and roll are really a way for young people to get that anger out", and, "It's silly to perform a song that has no relevance to the present or expresses feelings you no longer have."

Despite her retirement, Slick appeared twice with Kantner's revamped version of Jefferson Starship; the first came in 1995 when the band played at Los Angeles's House of Blues, as documented on the live album Deep Space/Virgin Sky. The second was for a post-9/11 gig in late 2001, during which she came on the stage initially covered in black from head to toe in a makeshift burqa. She then removed the burqa to reveal a covering bearing an American flag and the words "Fuck Fear". Her statement to fans on the outfit was: "The outfit is not about Islam, it's about oppression; this flag is not about politics, it's about liberty". She has generally otherwise refrained from engaging in the music business, although she did perform on "Knock Me Out", a track from In Flight, the 1996 solo debut from former 4 Non Blondes singer, and friend of daughter China, Linda Perry. The song was also on the soundtrack to the film The Crow: City of Angels.

In 2010, Slick co-wrote "Edge of Madness" with singer Michelle Mangione to raise money for remediation efforts following the BP oil spill. Grace also sang background vocals on the song and is clearly audible in the middle of the song singing, "On the edge of madness". Slick has made sporadic appearances and has done radio interviews. She accepted Jefferson Airplane's Grammy Lifetime Achievement awards in 2016, and made an appearance for the unveiling of the band's star on the Hollywood Walk of Fame in 2022.

== Personal life ==
Slick was married to cinematographer and drummer Gerald "Jerry" Slick from 1961 to 1971, then to lighting designer Skip Johnson from 1976 to 1994. She has a daughter, actress China Wing Kantner, born January 25, 1971. China's father is Jefferson Airplane guitarist Paul Kantner, with whom Slick had a relationship from 1969 to 1975.

On 13 May 1971, after an all-night recording session, Slick received a serious concussion, while drag-racing over 100 miles per hour (160 km/h) and drunk, in her sports car against Jorma Kaukonen, near the Golden Gate Bridge, losing control and crashing into a retaining wall.

Slick has publicly acknowledged her alcoholism and use of substances including LSD (for which she got the nickname The Acid Queen) and marijuana. By the age of 15 she was drinking heavily, disguising screwdrivers as orange juice at school and stealing gin from her parents. She has discussed her drug dependency and rehabilitation experiences in her autobiography, various interviews, and several published celebrity addiction and recovery books. The latter include The Courage to Change by Dennis Wholey and The Harder They Fall by Gary Stromberg and Jane Merrill.

Her alcoholism became a problem for the band during Jefferson Starship's 1978 European tour. The group had to cancel the first performance night in Germany because she was too intoxicated to perform, causing the audience to riot. She performed the next night with the band but was so inebriated that she could not sing properly. She also attacked the audience, mocking Germany for losing World War II and groping both female audience members and bandmates. She left the group the next day. The same year, she was "dragged off" the stage of a local San Francisco game show for abusing the contestants. She was admitted to a detoxification facility at least twice, once during the 1970s at Duffy's in Napa Valley, and once in the 1990s with daughter China.

In 2006, Slick suffered from diverticulitis. After initial surgery, she had a relapse requiring further surgery and a tracheotomy. She was placed in an induced coma for two months and then had to learn to walk again. Also in 2006, Slick gave a speech at the inauguration of the new Virgin America airline, which named their first aircraft Jefferson Airplane.

=== Legal incidents ===
President Richard Nixon's daughter Tricia and Slick are both alumnae of Finch College, and Slick was invited to a tea party for the alumnae at the White House in April 1970. She invited anarchist Abbie Hoffman to be her escort and planned to spike President Nixon's tea with 600 micrograms of LSD, but the party had been billed as an "all ladies" event. Hoffman's presence in the waiting line immediately aroused the suspicions of White House security personnel. He claimed to be Slick's "bodyguard and escort", which failed to convince the security personnel, who told him that the event was "strictly for females".

Hoffman then took out a black flag with a multicolored marijuana leaf and hung it on the White House gate. Slick declined to attend once Hoffman was denied entry, and the two ran across the street to a waiting car. Slick later speculated that she received the invitation only because it was addressed to "Grace Wing" (her maiden name), and that she never would have been invited if the Nixons had known that she was Grace Slick.

Slick was arrested at least four times for what she has referred to as "TUI" ("talking under the influence") and "drunk mouth". One incident occurred when a police officer encountered her sitting against a tree trunk in the backwoods of Marin County, California, drinking wine, eating bread, and reading poetry. The officer asked what she was doing; she gave a sarcastic response and was arrested and jailed. She was arrested in 1994 for assault with a deadly weapon after pointing an unloaded gun at a police officer. She alleged that the officer had come onto her property without explanation.

== Visual art ==
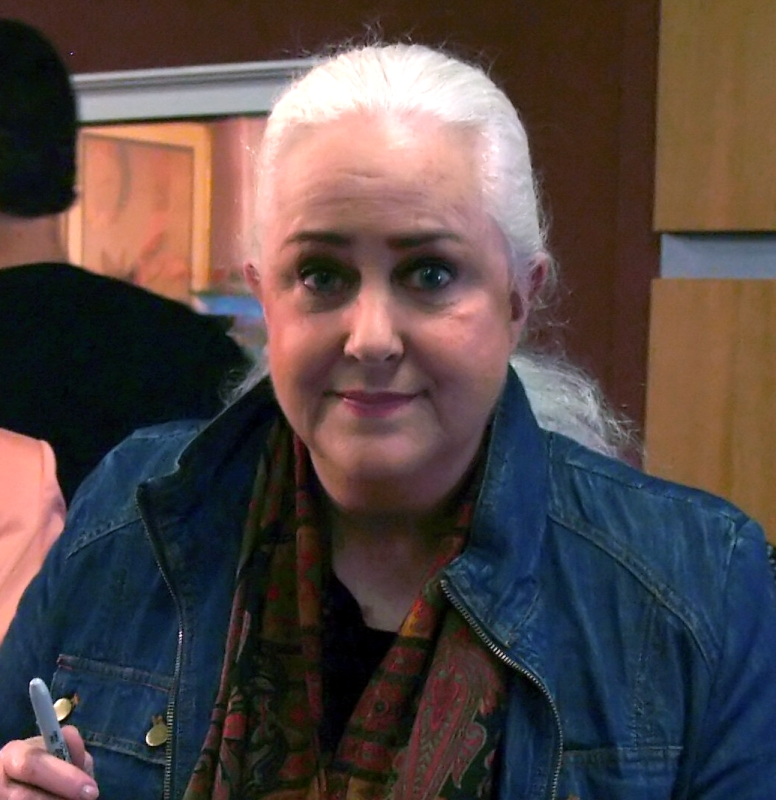
Slick in 2008

After retiring from music, Slick began painting and drawing. She has done many renditions of her fellow 1960s musicians, including Janis Joplin, Jerry Garcia, and others. Slick has had a passion for art since she was a child, before she pivoted to music. In 2000, she began displaying and selling her artwork. Soon thereafter, she was approached about writing her memoir, which ultimately became Somebody to Love? A Rock-and-Roll Memoir. Her agent saw her artwork and asked her to do some portraits of some of her various contemporaries from the rock-and-roll genre to be included in the autobiography. Hesitant at first (because she thought "it was way too cute. Rock-n-Roll draws Rock-n-Roll"), she eventually agreed because she found she enjoyed it, and color renditions of Janis Joplin, Jimi Hendrix, and Jerry Garcia appeared in the completed autobiography.

An Alice in Wonderland-themed painting and various other sketches are scattered throughout the book. Her paintings of Jorma Kaukonen and Jack Casady were used for the cover art of the 1998 album The Best of Hot Tuna. Though Slick has been drawing and painting since she was a child, she admits to not being able to multitask, so did not do much of it while she was focusing on her music career. A notable exception is the 1974 cover art of her first solo album, Manhole, which she signed "Child Type Odd Art by Grace".

Slick does not always use the same style or medium in her production of visual art and has no interest in doing so. She uses acrylic paints (saying oil paint takes too long to dry), canvas, pen, ink, scratchboard, pastels, and pencil. Many of her works are mixed media. Her styles include the children's bookish Alice in Wonderland themes, realistic rock and roll portraits, scratchboards of animals, minimalist ink wash-styled nudes, and a variety of other subjects and styles.

Slick's best-selling prints and originals are her various renditions of the White Rabbit and the portraits of her colleagues in the music industry. In 2006, the popularity of her Alice in Wonderland works led to a partnership with Dark Horse Comics, which resulted in the release of stationery and journals with the Wonderland motif.

While critics have variously panned and praised her work, Slick seems indifferent to the criticism. She views her visual artistry as just another extension of the artistic temperament that landed her in the music business in the first place, as it allows her to continue to produce art in a way that does not require the physical demands of appearing on a stage nightly or traveling with a large group of people.

Interviewed in 2007, Slick attends many of her art gallery shows across the United States, sometimes attending more than 30 shows in a year. While she says she enjoys talking with the people who come to her art shows, she is not a fan of the traveling involved, particularly the flying.

== Legacy ==
Slick was one of the earliest female rock stars alongside her close contemporary Janis Joplin, and was an important figure in the development of rock music in the late 1960s. Her distinctive vocal style and striking stage presence exerted influence on other female performers, including Stevie Nicks, Patti Smith, and Terri Nunn.

Between 1985 and 1999, Slick was the oldest female vocalist on a Billboard Hot 100 chart-topping single. "We Built This City" reached number one on November 16, 1985, shortly after her 46th birthday, and Slick subsequently broke her own record with "Nothing's Gonna Stop Us Now" in April 1987. Previously, this distinction belonged to Tina Turner with "What's Love Got To Do With It". Slick's record was broken by Cher, who was 53 in 1999 when "Believe" hit number one.

Slick was nominated for a Grammy Award in 1981 as Best Rock Female Vocalist for her solo album Dreams.

She was inducted into the Rock and Roll Hall of Fame in 1996 as a member of Jefferson Airplane.

She was ranked number 20 on VH1's 100 Greatest Women of Rock N Roll in 1999.

== Discography ==
=== Solo ===
Title	Album details	Peak chart positions				
Title	Album details	US	AUS	NLD	NOR	UK
Manhole	Released: January 4, 1974; Label: Grunt/RCA	127	—	—	—	—
Dreams	Released: March 18, 1980; Label: RCA	32	46	39	22	28
Welcome to the Wrecking Ball!	Released: January 28, 1981; Label: RCA	48	—	—	33	—
Software	Released: January 30, 1984; Label: RCA	—	—	—	—	—

=== Collaborative albums ===
Title	Album details	Peak chart positions	
Title	Album details	US	AUS
Sunfighter (with Paul Kantner)	Released: November 1971; Label: Grunt/RCA	89	45
Baron von Tollbooth & the Chrome Nun (with Paul Kantner and David Freiberg)	Released: May 1973; Label: Grunt/RCA	120	—

=== Other appearances ===
Year	Work	Collaborator	Comment
1971	If I Could Only Remember My Name	David Crosby	backing vocals on "What Are Their Names"
1971	Papa John Creach	Papa John Creach	vocals on "The Janitor Drives a Cadillac"
1972	Rolling Thunder	Mickey Hart	piano, backing vocals
1975	Seastones	Ned Lagin	voice
1981	Kent State soundtrack	Various artists	co-writer & vocals on "Dance Around the Sun" vocals on "They All Look the Same"
1982	Throwin' Down	Rick James	backing vocals
1985	Heart	Heart	backing vocals on "What About Love"
1988	Back to Avalon	Kenny Loggins	backing vocals
1995	Deep Space/Virgin Sky	Jefferson Starship	guest vocalist
1996	In Flight	Linda Perry	co-writer & backing vocals on "Knock Me Out"
1998	The Best of Hot Tuna	Hot Tuna	cover illustration
1999	Windows of Heaven	Jefferson Starship	vocals on "I'm On Fire"
1999	The Best of Grace Slick	Grace Slick	"Do You Remember Me?" (previously unreleased)
2001	Across the Sea of Suns	Jefferson Starship	liner notes
2007	Life Beneath the Sun	Michelle Mangione	cover illustration
2008	Jefferson's Tree of Liberty	Jefferson Starship	vocals on bonus track
2009	What Is a Saint	Michelle Mangione	co-writer of "What Is a Saint" & "Love Disappears"
2010	Ponies	Michelle Mangione	co-writer & backing vocals on "The Edge of Madness"
2023	"Lahaina Shine"	Michelle Mangione	co-writer
