= 2400 Fulton Street =

Greatest hits album by Jefferson Airplane
- Released: March 1987 (vinyl), 1990 (expanded CD)
- Genre: Psychedelic rock
- Length: 131:47
- Label: RCA Victor
- Producers: Bill Thompson; Randy Miller; Paul Atkinson

Jefferson Airplane chronology
Flight Log (1977)	2400 Fulton Street (1987)	Jefferson Airplane (1989)

2400 Fulton Street is a compilation album of music from the San Francisco rock band Jefferson Airplane, originally released in 1987 as a double LP containing 25 tracks. The title is taken from the street address of a mansion the band bought in 1966 and used as a residence. It is located across the street from Golden Gate Park.

The expanded CD release is titled "2400 Fulton Street — The CD Collection", and contains eleven extra tracks including one that comprises their otherwise unavailable Levis radio commercials of 1967. At the time, Levi Strauss marketed a line of jeans that were bleached white by exposure to sea water. Termed White Levis, they nevertheless came in several colors and were popular among surfers along the west coast. Levi Strauss had sought out three contemporary acts to help market the new product: Jefferson Airplane, The Sopwith Camel and the West Coast Natural Gas Co were selected and performed unstructured radio pieces which were then used in the commercials. The short radio spots aired nationally in the United States.

== Track listing ==
=== Disc One ===
Beginnings
No.	Title	Writer(s)	Original Album	Length
1.	"It's No Secret"	Marty Balin	Jefferson Airplane Takes Off	2:39
2.	"Come up the Years"	Balin, Paul Kantner	Jefferson Airplane Takes Off	2:32
3.	"My Best Friend"	Skip Spence	Surrealistic Pillow	3:02
4.	"Somebody to Love"	Darby Slick	Surrealistic Pillow	2:59
5.	"Comin' Back to Me"	Balin	Surrealistic Pillow	5:22
6.	"Embryonic Journey"	Jorma Kaukonen	Surrealistic Pillow	1:54
7.	"She Has Funny Cars"	Kaukonen, Balin	Surrealistic Pillow	3:10
8.	"Let's Get Together"	Chet Powers	Jefferson Airplane Takes Off	3:36
9.	"Blues from an Airplane"	Balin, Spence	Jefferson Airplane Takes Off	2:03
10.	"J.P.P. Mcstep B. Blues"	Spence	Early Flight	2:47

Psychedelia
No.	Title	Writer(s)	Original Album	Length
11.	"Plastic Fantastic Lover"	Balin	Surrealistic Pillow	2:37
12.	"Wild Tyme"	Kantner	After Bathing at Baxter's	3:08
13.	"The Ballad of You and Me and Pooneil"	Kantner	After Bathing at Baxter's	4:36
14.	"A Small Package of Value Will Come to You, Shortly"	Spencer Dryden, Gary Blackman, Bill Thompson	After Bathing at Baxter's	1:32
15.	"White Rabbit"	Grace Slick	Surrealistic Pillow	2:34
16.	"Won't You Try/Saturday Afternoon"	Kantner	After Bathing at Baxter's	5:04
17.	"Lather"	G. Slick	Crown of Creation	2:58
18.	"Fat Angel"	Donovan Leitch	Bless Its Pointed Little Head	7:39
19.	"The Last Wall of the Castle"	Kaukonen	After Bathing at Baxter's	2:44
20.	"Greasy Heart"	G. Slick	Crown of Creation	3:24

=== Disc Two ===
Revolution
No.	Title	Writer(s)	Original Album	Length
1.	"We Can Be Together"	Kantner	Volunteers	5:50
2.	"Crown of Creation"	Kantner	Crown of Creation	2:54
3.	"Mexico (different mix from the single)"	G. Slick	"Mexico" single A-side and Early Flight	1:52
4.	"Wooden Ships"	Kantner, David Crosby, Stephen Stills	Volunteers	6:23
5.	"Rejoyce"	G. Slick	After Bathing at Baxter's	4:02
6.	"Volunteers" (live)	Balin, Kantner	Woodstock	3:05
7.	"Have You Seen the Saucers?"	Kantner	"Mexico" single B-side and Early Flight	3:40
8.	"Eat Starch Mom"	Kaukonen, G. Slick	Long John Silver	4:34

Airplane Parts
No.	Title	Writer(s)	Original Album	Length
9.	"Pretty as You Feel"	Jack Casady, Joey Covington, Kaukonen	Bark	4:30
10.	"Martha"	Kantner	After Bathing at Baxter's	3:26
11.	"Today"	Balin, Kantner	Surrealistic Pillow	3:01
12.	"Triad"	Crosby	Crown of Creation	4:56
13.	"Third Week in the Chelsea"	Kaukonen	Bark	4:35
14.	"Good Shepherd"	Trad., arr. Kaukonen	Volunteers	4:26
15.	"Eskimo Blue Day"	Slick, Kantner	Volunteers	6:29
16.	"The Levi Commercials"			1:44

== Reception ==
Professional ratings
Review scores
Source	Rating
Allmusic	4/5 stars
The Encyclopedia of Popular Music	4/5 stars

Allmusic's Bruce Eder rated the compilation four out of five stars. He explained that it "[jumps] around a little too much, but provides a look for the uninitiated into the evolution of the group's sound". He concluded by stating that "the sound was a major improvement at the time" and that "the notes contained what was, at the time, perhaps the best easily available account of the group's history."

== Charts ==
Chart (1987)	Peak position
US Billboard 200	138
