= Feed Your Head: Live '67–'69 =

Feed Your Head: Live '67-'69

Live album by Jefferson Airplane
- Released: 1996
- Recorded: 1967–69
- Genre: Rock
- Label: Upbeat / Prism Leisure

Jefferson Airplane chronology
Journey: The Best of Jefferson Airplane (1996)	Feed Your Head: Live '67-'69 (1996)	Jefferson Airplane and Beyond (1997)

Feed Your Head: Live '67–'69 is the 1996 release of songs from the Jefferson Airplane concerts at Winterland, March 1967, and Monterey Pop Festival. It also has live tracks from Bless Its Pointed Little Head. Don't Slip Away and And I Like It are the studio versions.

== Track listing ==
No.	Title	Writer(s)	Length
1.	"The Other Side to This Life"	Fred Neil
2.	"Somebody To Love"	Darby Slick
3.	"Plastic Fantastic Lover"	Marty Balin
4.	"White Rabbit"	Grace Slick
5.	"3/5 of a Mile in 10 Seconds"	Balin
6.	"She Has Funny Cars"	Buchwald/Kaukonen
7.	"High Flying Bird"	Wheeler
8.	"It's No Secret"	Balin
9.	"Today"	Paul Kantner/Balin
10.	"My Best Friend"	Skip Spence
11.	"Don't Slip Away"	Balin/Spence
12.	"This Is My Life and I Like It"	Buchwald/Kaukonen

== Personnel ==
- Marty Balin – vocals, guitar
- Grace Slick – vocals, piano
- Jorma Kaukonen – lead guitar, vocals
- Paul Kantner – rhythm guitar, vocals
- Jack Casady – bass
- Spencer Dryden – drums
