= Born to Be Burned =

Compilation album by The Great Society
- Released: 1995
- Recorded: October–December 1965, Golden State Recorders, San Francisco, CA
- Genre: Garage rock; psychedelic rock; raga rock
- Length: 41:35
- Label: Sundazed
- Producer: Sylvester Stewart, Leo de Gar Kulka

Born to Be Burned is a compilation album by the San Francisco garage rock and psychedelic rock band the Great Society. The album is made up of material recorded during the band's short-lived association with Autumn Records in 1965, with the majority of it previously unreleased. The exceptions to this are the songs "Someone to Love" and "Free Advice" (tracks 1 and 2 on the album), which had both been issued as a single on Northbeach Records, a subsidiary of Autumn Records, in February 1966.

The album contains many of The Great Society's signature songs, including "Free Advice", a drone-laden piece of raga rock, greatly influenced by Indian classical music, and "Father Bruce", a song inspired by comedian and counterculture hero, Lenny Bruce. The oriental-sounding "Daydream-Nightmare-Love" and the darkly psychedelic "Born to Be Burned" are also included. "Someone to Love" is arguably The Great Society's most famous song, due to the later hit single version by Jefferson Airplane (retitled "Somebody to Love"). The Great Society's vocalist, Grace Slick, joined Jefferson Airplane in late 1966 and consequently she sings lead vocal on the Airplane's recording of the song, which became a Top 5 hit in the U.S. in May 1967.

== Reception ==
Professional ratings
Review scores
Source	Rating
Allmusic	3/5 stars
Rolling Stone	3/5 stars

Released by Sundazed Music in 1995, Born to Be Burned garnered reasonable reviews, with most critics noting the power and confidence of Grace Slick's voice but also commenting on the relative lack of professionalism exhibited by the rest of the band. Most reviewers noted that the album would predominantly be of interest to fans of Grace Slick and Jefferson Airplane or connoisseurs of the San Francisco Bay Area acid rock scene. Many of the tracks found on Born to Be Burned were later included on the Big Beat Records' compilation album, Someone to Love: The Birth of the San Francisco Sound.

== Track listing ==
No.	Title	Writer(s)	Length
1.	"Free Advice"	Darby Slick	2:29
2.	"Someone to Love"	Darby Slick	3:03
3.	"You Can't Cry"	David Miner	2:32
4.	"That's How It Is"	David Miner	2:27
5.	"Girl"	David Miner	2:09
6.	"Where"	David Miner	2:10
7.	"Heads Up"	Grace Slick	1:17
8.	"Free Advice" (Alternate version #2)	Darby Slick	2:06
9.	"Father Bruce"	Grace Slick, Darby Slick, Jerry Slick, David Miner	3:07
10.	"Born to Be Burned"	Darby Slick, Jerry Slick	2:05
11.	"Double Triptamine Superautomatic Everlovin' Man"	David Miner	1:55
12.	"Love You Girl"	David Miner	3:06
13.	"That's How It Is" (Alternate version)	David Miner	2:22
14.	"Right to Me"	David Miner	3:04
15.	"Where" (Alternate version)	David Miner	2:13
16.	"Free Advice" (Alternate version #1)	Darby Slick	2:09
17.	"Daydream-Nightmare-Love"	David Miner	3:17

== Personnel ==
- Darby Slick - guitar, backing vocals
- Grace Slick - vocals, guitar, recorder
- David Miner - vocals, guitar
- Jerry Slick - drums
- Bard Dupont - bass

=== Additional personnel ===
- Produced by Sylvester Stewart and Leo de Gar Kulka
- Mixed and mastered by Bob Irwin and Chris Athens
- Original sessions engineered by John Haeny
