= Conspicuous Only in Its Absence =

Live album by The Great Society
- Released: March 1968
- Recorded: 1966
- Venue: The Matrix, San Francisco
- Genre: Psychedelic rock, raga rock
- Label: Columbia
- Producer: Peter Abram

The Great Society chronology
Conspicuous Only in Its Absence (1968)	How It Was (1968)

Professional ratings
Review scores
Source	Rating
AllMusic	3/5 stars

Conspicuous Only in Its Absence is a live album by the American psychedelic rock band the Great Society, released in 1968 by Columbia Records. It was their first album released and consists of recordings made during a live concert performance by the band at The Matrix club in San Francisco in 1966. Additional recordings from the same concert were released later in 1968 on the album How It Was. These two albums were repackaged in 1971 as a double album called Collector's Item.

Upon its initial release in 1968, Conspicuous Only in Its Absence reached No. 166 on the Billboard Top LPs chart. A single featuring "Sally, Go 'Round the Roses" and "Didn't Think So" was released in conjunction with the album by Columbia Records but it failed to chart.

Singer Grace Slick took her song "White Rabbit" and Darby Slick's song "Somebody to Love" to her next band, Jefferson Airplane.

== Track listing ==
1. "Sally Go 'Round the Roses" (Lona Stevens, Zell Sanders) – 6:32
2. "Didn't Think So" (Grace Slick) – 3:23
3. "Grimly Forming" (Peter van Gelder) – 3:53
4. "Somebody to Love" (Darby Slick) – 4:27
5. "Father Bruce" (Darby Slick, Grace Slick, Jerry Slick, David Miner) – 3:31
6. "Outlaw Blues" (Bob Dylan) – 2:27
7. "Often as I May" (Grace Slick) – 3:43
8. "Arbitration" (Peter van Gelder) – 3:58
9. "White Rabbit" (Grace Slick) – 6:15

== Personnel ==
The Great Society

- Grace Slick – piano, vocals, bass guitar
- Darby Slick – guitar
- David Miner – guitar, vocals
- Jerry Slick – drums
- Peter van Gelder – bass guitar, flute, saxophone

Technical

- Herb Greene - photography
