= The Great Society =

The Great Society may refer to:

- Great Society, a program of domestic legislation initiated by U.S. President Lyndon B. Johnson
- The Great Society (band), a 1960s rock band from San Francisco featuring Grace Slick, which took its name from Johnson's initiative
- The Great Society (play) by Robert Schenkkan, a follow-up to All the Way (play), both about Lyndon Johnson's presidency
