= Friction Groove =

English 1980s dance-punk band

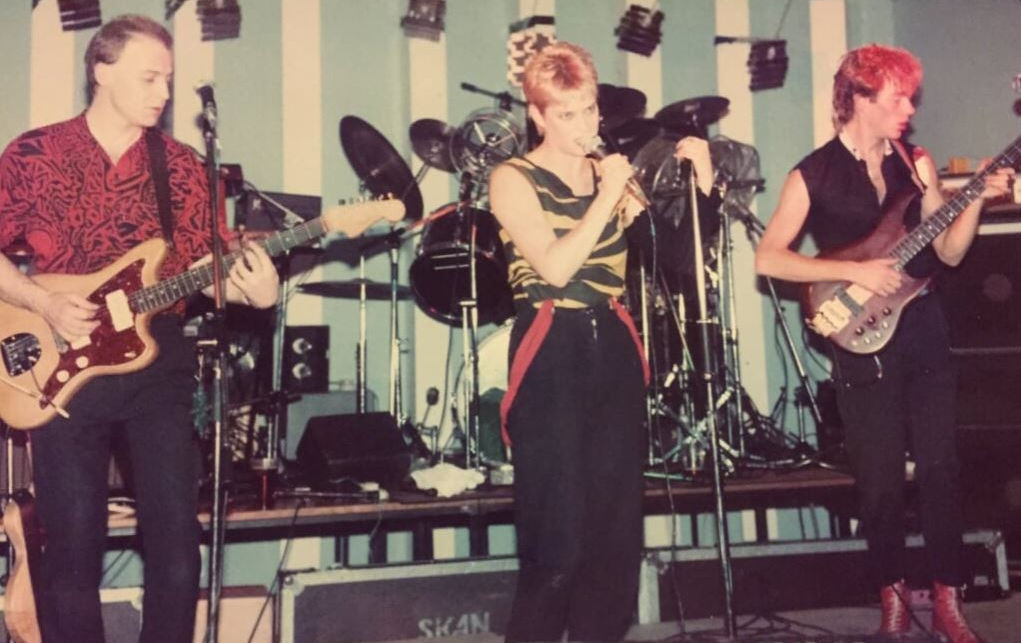
- Friction Groove, performing live

Background information
- Origin: Reading, England, U.K.
- Genres: Dance-punk; new wave; alternative
- Years active: 1983–1985
- Labels: Atlantic
- Past members: Alison Rolls; Mic Dover; John Reynolds; Mike Clowes; Ali McMordie

Friction Groove was a 1980s dance-punk band formed by members of earlier new wave band Between Pictures.

Between Pictures gigged and recorded in London and South-East England from 1979 to 1983 and released two singles, "Treat Me Like An Equal" / "Life Of Your Own" and "Birthday Card" / "Down At The Factory". Their original line-up consisted of lead guitarist Mic Dover, bass player Paul Tucker, vocalist Alison Rolls, keyboard player Haydn Meddick, and drummer Steve Sawtell. Dover and Tucker were ex-members of proto-punk band, Clayson and the Argonauts, with Alan Clayson. In 1982, Sawtell was replaced by Kevin Drain, from the K9's, who was subsequently replaced by John Reynolds.

Band members Dover, Rolls, and Reynolds dissolved Between Pictures in 1983 to form Friction Groove, having recruited Mike Clowes on keyboards. The search for a bass player took several months, auditioning the late Garry Jones and Barry Adamson, ultimately selecting Ali McMordie in late 1983, after the breakup of Stiff Little Fingers.

Record Producer Martin Rushent of Genetic Studios heard a Between Pictures demo of the Dover-Tucker composition "Time Bomb" and offered Dover and Rolls a record deal, which they declined as it was not for the whole band. Instead, Friction Groove were signed by Atlantic Records in 1984 and released the singles "Time Bomb" / "Ambition" and "Family Affair" / "The Kiss" from their studio album The Black Box in 1985. The Black Box was produced by Dave Allen (best known for his work with The Cure) and recorded at Hansa by the Wall in Berlin (November 1984) and ICP Studios in Brussels (February 1985).

After managerial changes at Atlantic Records and disappointing record sales of The Black Box album, the band split in 1985.

== Discography ==
=== Studio albums ===
- 1985: The Black Box (1985)

1. Time Bomb (Dover and Tucker)
2. Family Affair (Sylvester Stewart [Sly Stone])
3. The Kiss (Reynolds and Clowes)
4. Smouldering (Dover)
5. Nevermind Love (Dover, Clowes, McMordie)
6. Black Box (Dover)
7. School Bully (Dover)
8. The (A) On The Wall (Dover and Rolls)
9. Infallible System (Dover)
10. Somebody To Love (Darby Slick)

=== Singles ===
- 1985: Time Bomb (Atlantic Records)

A. Time Bomb (Dover and Tucker)
B. Ambition (Dover and Rolls)

- 1985: Family Affair (Atlantic Records)

A. Family Affair (Wicked Pulse Mix) (Sylvester Stewart [Sly Stone])
B. The Kiss (Mix For The Prisoner) (Reynolds and Clowes)

== Activity since ==
Former members Reynolds, McMordie and Clowes went on to work with Sinéad O'Connor (married to Reynolds at the time), recording her debut album The Lion and the Cobra and touring for a while.

McMordie later rejoined Stiff Little Fingers in 2006 for a tour, and is now part of their permanent lineup again.

Reynolds continues a career as drummer and record producer, having worked with U2 and David Byrne, amongst others.

Rolls went on to join the twelve-piece BackBeat Band (soul and R&B), later leaving to form her own eight-piece group Short People. She subsequently formed 99lbs (a tribute band to Ann Peebles), and more recently retro funk / soul band, The Fever45s.

Dover moved from songwriting to scriptwriting and filmmaking, emigrating to Nelson, New Zealand in 2003. There, as well as helping to set up fringe theatre company Jo Public Nga Tangata, he was also the gigs promoter for The Free House yurt and the Marchfest Craft Beer and Music Festival from 2008 to 2020.
