= Rex Garvin =

American singer

- Born: July 24, 1940; Harlem, New York City, U.S.
- Died: December 2, 2013 (aged 73) Atlanta, Georgia, U.S.
- Genres: R&B, soul
- Occupations: singer, songwriter, arranger
- Instruments: vocal, keyboards
- Years active: 1954–1975
- Labels: J&S, others
- Formerly of: The Hearts; Johnnie and Joe; Marie Knight; Rex Garvin and the Mighty Cravers

Rex Garvin (July 24, 1940 – December 2, 2013) was an American rhythm and blues singer, songwriter, keyboard player and arranger. His writing credits include the 1957 US chart hit "Over the Mountain; Across the Sea", by Johnnie and Joe, and his own 1966 recording "Sock It To 'Em J.B.", later recorded by The Specials.

== Life and career ==
Garvin was born in Harlem and raised by foster parents in the Bronx. He took piano lessons as a child. In 1954, he helped form The Hearts, a female vocal group with whom he sang bass, played piano and wrote and arranged songs. Managed by neighbor Zelma "Zell" Sanders, The Hearts' first record "Lonely Nights" was issued on the Baton label in early 1955 and reached No. 8 on the Billboard R&B chart. He remained involved with the group as their pianist, arranger, musical director and (in their own word) "maestro" through various personnel changes during the 1950s, later explaining that he did so "mainly to meet girls". Members of The Hearts later performed as The Jaynetts.

At the same time, Garvin became Sanders' main assistant at J&S Records, which she set up in 1956, and he was responsible for the label's typical full, bottom-heavy piano-laden arrangements. The label's greatest successes came with the duo Johnnie and Joe, whose biggest hit "Over the Mountain, Across the Sea" (#8 Pop and No. 3 R&B in 1957) was written by Garvin, who sang harmony vocals on the song and was credited as bandleader. The duo comprised Garvin's friend Joe Rivers, and Sanders' daughter Johnnie. The song was covered in 1963 by Bobby Vinton, whose version reached No. 21 on the Hot 100.

Garvin's own recording career started in 1957, with "My Darling Dear". In 1959, his vocal duet with Marie Knight as Marie and Rex on "I Can't Sit Down" reached No. 94 on the Billboard pop chart. He formed his own group Rex Garvin and the Mighty Cravers in 1961, releasing their first single "Go Little Willie"/"Emulsified", on Epic Records; the single was reissued two years later by Okeh. The group toured widely on the "Chitlin' Circuit".

Although Garvin had little commercial success, he released a string of records through the 1960s in a variety of styles, including "Oh Yeah!" (on the Scatt label, an offshoot of J&S, 1962), "Soul Food" (on Keynote, 1963), "Sock It To 'Em J.B." (originally on the Like label, 1966), "I Gotta Go Now (Up on the Floor)" (Like, 1967), and "You Don't Need No Help (You Can Sock It to Yourself)" (WSJ Sound, 1969). Several of these recordings have been anthologized in recent years, particularly on Northern Soul compilations. "Sock It to 'Em J.B." had a double meaning, being a tribute to James Bond performed in the style of James Brown; it was issued as a single in the UK as well as the U.S., and later was covered by British band The Specials on their album More Specials in 1980 (a cover which lent the song a potential triple meaning, as it was also a form of homage to drummer John Bradbury). Rex Garvin and the Mighty Cravers – comprising saxophonist Clayton Dunn and drummer Pete Holman, together with Garvin on keyboards – also released an album, Raw Funky Earth on the Tower label in 1968. Their last record release was "Strange Happenings" on the Chieftain label in 1971.

He left the Mighty Cravers and quit the music business in about 1975. He moved to Atlanta, Georgia, but continued to play occasional gigs until 1985. In 1990, "Emulsified" was covered by Yo La Tengo on their album Fakebook. Garvin died in Atlanta in 2013, aged 73.
