= Sally Go 'Round the Roses =

1963 song by The Jaynetts

Single by the Jaynetts

from the album Sally Go 'Round the Roses
- B-side: "Instrumental"
- Released: August 1963
- Recorded: 1963
- Studio: Broadway Recording Studios (Manhattan)
- Genre: R&B; pop
- Length: 3:04
- Label: Tuff
- Songwriters: Lona Stevens, Zell Sanders
- Producer: Abner Spector (1917–2010)

The Jaynetts singles chronology
"Be My Boyfriend" (1958)	"Sally Go 'Round the Roses" (1963)	"Keep an Eye on Her" (1963)

"Sally Go 'Round the Roses" is the name of a 1963 hit by the Jaynetts, a Bronx-based one-hit wonder girl group, released by J&S Records on the Tuff label.

== Background ==
The producer of "Sally Go 'Round the Roses", Abner Spector, was an A&R man for the Chicago-based Chess Records. Spector was responsible for The Corsairs' 1962 number 12 hit "Smoky Places", which had been released on Tuff, a subsidiary of J&S Records. In the summer of 1963, Spector asked J&S owner Zelma "Zell" Sanders to assemble a vocal ensemble to record a girl group- style record, to which end Sanders wrote the song "Sally..." with Spector's wife Lona Stevens, drawing inspiration from the nursery rhyme "Ring around the Rosie". The songwriting copyright for "Sally..." is now in the name of Abner Spector who died in 2010; Zell Sanders died in 1976.

The arrangement for "Sally Go 'Round the Roses" was provided by Artie Butler, who recalls Spector "asked me to listen to [the] song...[I] decided that in its present form it did not [have potential], but I heard something in my head. He said, 'Go into a small demo studio and do what you hear', and he would pay for it." Butler says that he prepped the backing track for "Sally..." at Broadway Recording Studios in the Ed Sullivan Theater; in spite of it being widely reported that Buddy Miles is the drummer, Butler claims that, except for the guitar parts (by Al Gorgoni and Carl Lynch), he played all the instruments on the track. Butler states the entire recording of "Sally..." was done "on an old Ampex tape machine at 7 1/2 IPS mono....Each time when I added another element" – including the final element: the vocalists – "I added a different type of reverb. Each generation [i.e. development] seemed to add to the distinct sound of the record."

Besides the five vocalists credited in the group which Zell Sanders assembled to record "Sally Go 'Round the Roses" (Yvonne Bushnell, Ethel Davis (aka Vernell Hill), Ada Ray Kelly, Johnnie Louise Richardson and Mary Sue Wells (aka Mary Sue Wellington/Mary Green Wilson)), at least five other vocalists are known to be featured on the track: Selena Healey, Marie Hood, Marlene Jenkins (aka Marlina Mack/Marlina Mars), Louise Harris Murray, Lezli Valentine and Iggy Williams have been identified as participating in the recording sessions for "Sally...". The recording sessions took place over a week, running up costs of $60,000, then an exorbitant amount of time and money for a single track. According to Johnnie Louise Richardson: "Anybody that came in the studio that week, [Spector] would put them on [the track]. Originally, I think he had about 20 voices on 'Sally.'"

Butler's recollection is that Spector only heard the "Sally Go 'Round the Roses" track when it was completed and "hated it. He was really angry. He felt that I wasted his money." Butler played the track for Jerry Leiber and Mike Stoller, who offered to buy it from Spector: the interest of the duo caused Spector to reassess "Sally...", which he had Sanders release as a single credited to 'the Jaynetts', with the instrumental track as the B-side. Butler claimed his only return for arranging "Sally..." was being credited as the arranger on the record: a 1971 Billboard article states that Butler's arrangement of "Sally..." did earn him $3.

The recording engineer of "Sally Go 'Round the Roses" was John P. "Jack" Sullivan.

== Reception ==
"Sally Go 'Round the Roses" had its first major market breakout in San Francisco, its ringing arrangement being a precursor of the San Francisco Sound. The song was a favorite number of Grace Slick when she fronted the Great Society, her pre-Jefferson Airplane outfit, and it was a formative influence on Laura Nyro.

"Sally Go 'Round the Roses" peaked at number 2 on the Billboard Hot 100 dated 28 September 1963, remaining at number 2 on the Hot 100 dated 5 October, both weeks kept out of the top slot by "Blue Velvet" by Bobby Vinton. On the Music Vendor Top 40 dated 12 October 1963, "Sally Go 'Round the Roses" was ranked at number 1. In the Cash Box Top 100, it reached the number 3 spot on 28 September 1963, its highest position; it remained there for another week (5 October 1963). It was also a hit in France, reaching number 7 with a 17-week chart run, and reached number 2 in New Zealand. In Canada it was number 6 for 2 weeks starting September 30, 1963.

Tuff released a Sally Go 'Round the Roses album which, despite the group being promoted as a quintet, displayed a cover image of a trio, only two of whom, Ethel Davis and Lezli Valentine, are identifiable. Besides the title cut, in both vocal and instrumental versions, and the follow-up single "Keep an Eye on Her", the album featured "Archie's Melody", "Bongo Bobby", "I Wanna Know", "No Love at All", "One Track Mind", "Pick Up My Marbles", "School Days" and "See Saw". Also featured as 'a special guest appearance' was "Dear Abby", credited to the Hearts, a minor hit (number 94) recorded by at least some of the same personnel who were involved with "Sally...".

Billboard placed the song at number 78 on its list of 100 Greatest Girl Group Songs of All Time.

== Interpretations ==
Sally go round the roses
(Sally go round the pretty roses)
They won't tell your secret
(they won't tell your secret)

— Lona Stevens, Zell Sanders, "Sally Go 'Round the Roses"

"Sally Go 'Round the Roses" was unlike other pop songs of the day, with a spooky, even ominous, musical ambiance heightened by the sometimes odd and opaque lyrics, which gave the song a mysterious feeling that probably accounted in part for its popularity, and which has led to speculation on the meaning of the song. "Sally Go 'Round the Roses" could be interpreted as a conventional song of heartbreak over cheating, or it could be – and has been – seen as alluding to deeper matters, including drug use, illegitimate motherhood, madness, suicide, or, most especially, lesbianism.

Tim Buckley builds on this latter notion on his song "Sally, Go 'Round the Roses" from his 1973 album Sefronia. Although the song contains many new lyrics not in the original (and credits only Buckley as the songwriter), it begins with a version of Sanders' song but with the lyric "Sally don't you go, don't you go downtown; saddest thing in the whole wide world is to see your baby with another girl" replaced with "Oh Sally don't you go down, oh darlin' don't you go downtown; Honey the saddest thing in the whole wide world is to find your woman been with another girl".

== Other versions ==
"Sally Go 'Round the Roses"

Single by The Great Society

from the album Conspicuous Only in its Absence
- A-side: "Didn't Think So"
- Released: 1968
- Recorded: 1966
- Genre: Psychedelic rock
- Label: Columbia
- Songwriter: Lona Stevens, Zell Sanders

The Great Society singles chronology
"Someone to Love"	"Didn't Think So" / "Sally Go 'Round the Roses"

"Sally Go 'Round the Roses"

Single by Donna Gaines
- B-side: "So Said The Man"
- Released: 1971
- Genre: Soul; funk
- Length: 4:17
- Label: MCA
- Songwriters: Lona Stevens, Zell Sanders
- Producer: Vince Melouney

Donna Gaines singles chronology
"If You Walkin' Alone" (1969)	"Sally Go 'Round the Roses" (1971)	"Denver Dream" (1974)

A 1966 performance of the song by Grace Slick is featured on Conspicuous Only in its Absence, the Great Society's live album released in 1968. The recording was released as a single by Columbia Records in 1968 and got some Top 40 airplay, but failed to chart.

In the UK, where the Jaynetts' single had a non-charting 1963 release on Stateside Records, "Sally Go 'Round the Roses" was first covered by Lyn Cornell, which had an October 1963 release on Decca: this version also failed to chart, as did later covers by the Remo Four in May 1964, and Dee King in April 1966, both on Piccadilly Records. "Sally..." would gain its highest UK profile when recorded by Pentangle in 1969, for their hit album Basket of Light; "Sally..." was employed as B-side for the 1970 US single release of the Basket of Light track, "Light Flight", which had charted in the UK but with a different B-side ("Cold Mountain").

A French language version of "Sally Go 'Round the Roses", rendered by Jacques Plante [not the hockey player of the same name] as "Rose (Parmi Les Roses)" (Rose among roses), was recorded in the autumn of 1963 by both Richard Anthony; Anthony's version became the hit in 1963–64 reaching number 3 in France and also – as a double A-side hit with "Tchin Tchin" – number 4 in Belgium (Wallonia). Nana Mouskouri, who also recorded "Rose (Parmi Les Roses)", recorded the Italian rendering "Rosa tra le rose", which charted in Italy at number 32 in 1965.

Joan Baez is shown singing a fragment of "Sally Go 'Round the Roses" in the 1967 film Don't Look Back.

In Australia, Doug Parkinson and the Questions had a hit with "Sally Go 'Round the Roses", reaching number 33 in 1967.

A version of "Sally Go Round The Roses" was also the first single release by the American singer Donna Summer, then known as Donna Gaines. Gaines recorded the track in a session in London, produced by former Bee Gees' guitarist Vince Melouney, also recording the Melouney original "So Said the Man", which served as the single's B-side. "Sally..." by Donna Gaines was issued as a one-off 1971 release on MCA Records in the UK (with catalog# MK 5060) and Europe with no evident result. Bob Stanley describes Gaines' version as "minimalist funk".

"Sally Go 'Round the Roses" has also been recorded by Sunshine Ward on RCA Records in 1967, as well as Question Mark & the Mysterians, Jon Spencer Blues Explosion, Pentangle (on the album Basket of light), Judy Collins (on Portrait of an American Girl 2005), Yvonne Elliman, Fanny, Holly Golightly, the Ikettes (B-side of "(Never More) Lonely For You" – December 1965), Alannah Myles, Asha Puthli, Normie Rowe, Sarah June (2010), Mitch Ryder, Susanna Hoffs, Voice Farm and – as an instrumental – by Henry Kaiser. The soundtrack for the 1999 film A Walk on the Moon featured a remake of "Sally..." by Damnations TX. Anny Celsi remade "Sally Go 'Round the Roses" for her 2009 album Tangle Free World: Celsi's version features Evie Sands as a backup vocalist. The Del-Byzanteens also covered this song on the album Lies To Live By in 1982.

Patti Scialfa's self-penned song "The Word" on her 2007 album Play It as It Lays references the lyrics of "Sally Go 'Round the Roses" and acknowledges the source.

Tim Buckley included a song entitled "Sally, Go 'Round the Roses" on his 1973 Sefronia album, which begins with extensive quotes from the Jaynettes' song, although it adds many new lyrics and is credited only to Buckley as sole songwriter.

The Third Mind covered "Sally, Go 'Round the Roses" on their second album released in 2023 "The Third Mind 2," featuring Jesse Sykes (acoustic guitar, vocals); Dave Alvin (electric guitar); Victor Krummenacher (bass guitar); David Immerglück (guitar/harmonium/mellotron); and Michael Jerome (drums/percussion). The band played the song on their early 2024 tour, with Mark Karan replacing David Immerglück on guitar.

== See also ==
- List of 1960s one-hit wonders in the United States
