= J & S Records =

American record label

J & S Records was a New York record label started in 1956 and continued through to the early 1970s. The owner was Zelma "Zell" Sanders (1922–1976), one of the few woman label owners in the record business.

In the early 1950s Sanders was managing a girl vocal group, The Hearts. She arranged a contract for them on New York's Baton Records and hired and fired members until she got the mix she wanted. In mid-1956 she decided to start her own label, J & S Records.

The label's first big success came in 1957 with "Over the Mountain; Across the Sea" by Johnnie & Joe, a duo which included Sanders's daughter Johnnie Louise Richardson. The song was written by Rex Garvin, who also sang vocal harmonies. Garvin was the pianist and musical director with the Hearts. He wrote and produced songs and sang backup when needed. "Over the Mountain, Cross the Sea" was leased to Chess Records for national distribution.

The Hearts themselves moved over from Baton to J&S in the middle of 1957. Baby Washington, one of the later members of The Hearts, also recorded under her own name for an independent New Jersey label Neptune Records (no relation to the 1969 label of Gamble & Huff); when her recording of "The Time" became popular in the Newark, New Jersey area, Neptune Records signed a distribution deal with J & S. "The Time" was later leased to Sue Records. Freddie Scott was another early act in 1956. Sanders leased to many companies who would spread her product better than she was able, including Gone Records and ABC-Paramount Records. Subsidiary labels included Zell's Records, Scatt Records, Sprout Records and Dice Records.

By the early 1960s J & S was in financial trouble, although long-standing contacts with Chess managed to keep it afloat. A new label, Tuff Records, was created with Chess money, and Abner Spector was told to manage it. In 1963 Spector used the Hearts, renamed as The Jaynetts, and had a hit with "Sally Go 'Round the Roses." Sanders released music credited to the Hearts, The Jaynetts, The Clickettes, The Poppies, The Z-Debs, The Endeavours, and The Patty Cakes, all made by the same group of girls.

Sanders' (and J & S's) last major production was a psychedelic rock release by Pugsley Munion, the single (JS 0002) and album (SLP-0001) "Just Like You" in 1970.

Zell Sanders died in 1976, and her daughter Johnnie Louise Richardson died in 1988.

== See also ==
- List of record labels
