= The World We Live In =

The World We Live In may refer to:

- The World We Live In (album), a 1982 album by Voice Farm
- "The World We Live In" (Life magazine), a science series that ran in Life magazine from 1952 to 1954
- "The World We Live In" (song), a 2009 song by The Killers
- The World We Live In and Live in Hamburg, a 1985 video release by Depeche Mode
- Pictures from the Insects' Life, also known as The World We Live In, a 1922 play by Karel Čapek
- The World We Live In: Stories, a 1944 short story collection by Louis Bromfield

== See also ==
- "This Is the World We Live In", a 2003 song by Alcazar
