= Voice Farm =

American music and video collective

- Voice Farm c. 1980 (left to right): Charly Brown, Myke Reilly

Background information
- Origin: San Francisco, California
- Genres: Alternative rock, electronica, electropunk, synthpop
- Years active: 1979–present
- Labels: Optional Music, Ralph Records, Morgan Creek Records, Nice Tone Music
- Members: Charly Brown; Myke Reilly; Ken Weller; Marilynn Fowler
- Past members: Gary Miles; Debra Hanes
- Website: http://www.voice-farm.com

Voice Farm is a musical group and video collective based in San Francisco. Vocalist Charly Brown and sound designer Myke Reilly form the core of the group. The band began performing in 1979 at San Francisco clubs like the Mabuhay Gardens and Savoy Tivoli with bands such as Los Microwaves, Units, Tuxedo Moon, and Pink Section.

Voice Farm had several singles in 1981 and an album in 1982 on Optional Music, after which the group was signed to A&M Records. They were released from their contract after two years with no recordings. Ralph Records released the group's "radically different" sophomore album in 1987 and several dates opening for Depeche Mode followed.

In 1991 they released a Billboard charting dance single, "Free Love". The group now included guitarist Ken Weller, back-up singer Marilynn Fowler and live support from the dance troupe Oblong Rhonda. A fascination with popular culture and media continues to pervade Voice Farm's creative projects, including videos on their website and YouTube channel.

The Voice Farm song "Sleep" appears on the Let Them Eat Jellybeans! compilation.

== Discography ==
=== Studio albums ===
- The World We Live In (1982)
- Voice Farm (1987)
- Bigger Cooler Weirder (1991)
- The Love Experiment (1995)
- Super Nova Experts (2009)

=== Singles ===
- "Sleep" B/W "Modern Things" (1981)
- "Double Garage" B/W "Elevate" (1981)
- Free Love (1991)
