= Boston Society of Film Critics Awards 2009 =

Annual US film awards ceremony

30th BSFC Awards

December 13, 2009

Best Film:
The Hurt Locker

The 30th Boston Society of Film Critics Awards, honoring the best in filmmaking in 2009, were given on December 13, 2009.

== Winners ==
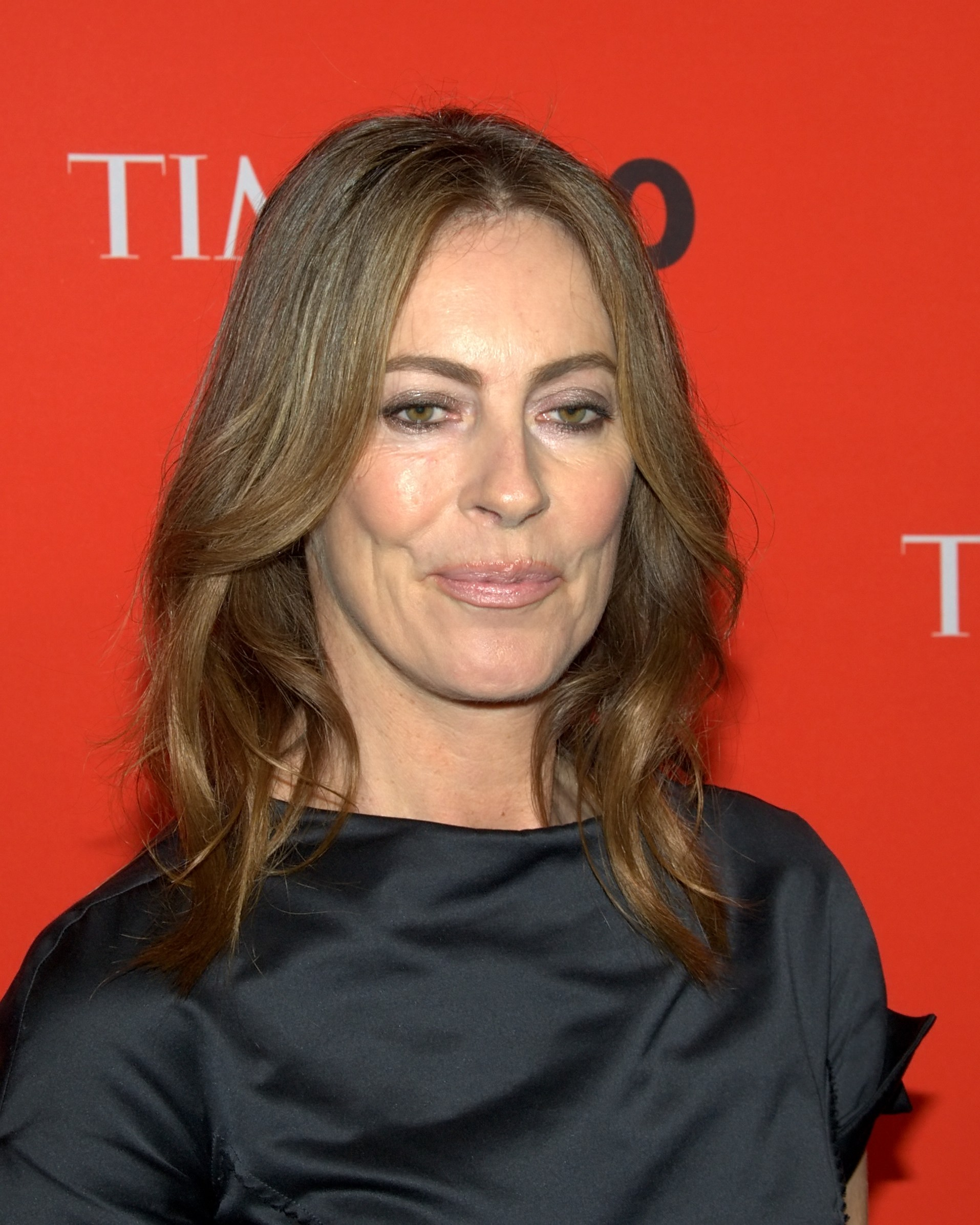
Kathryn Bigelow, Best Director winner

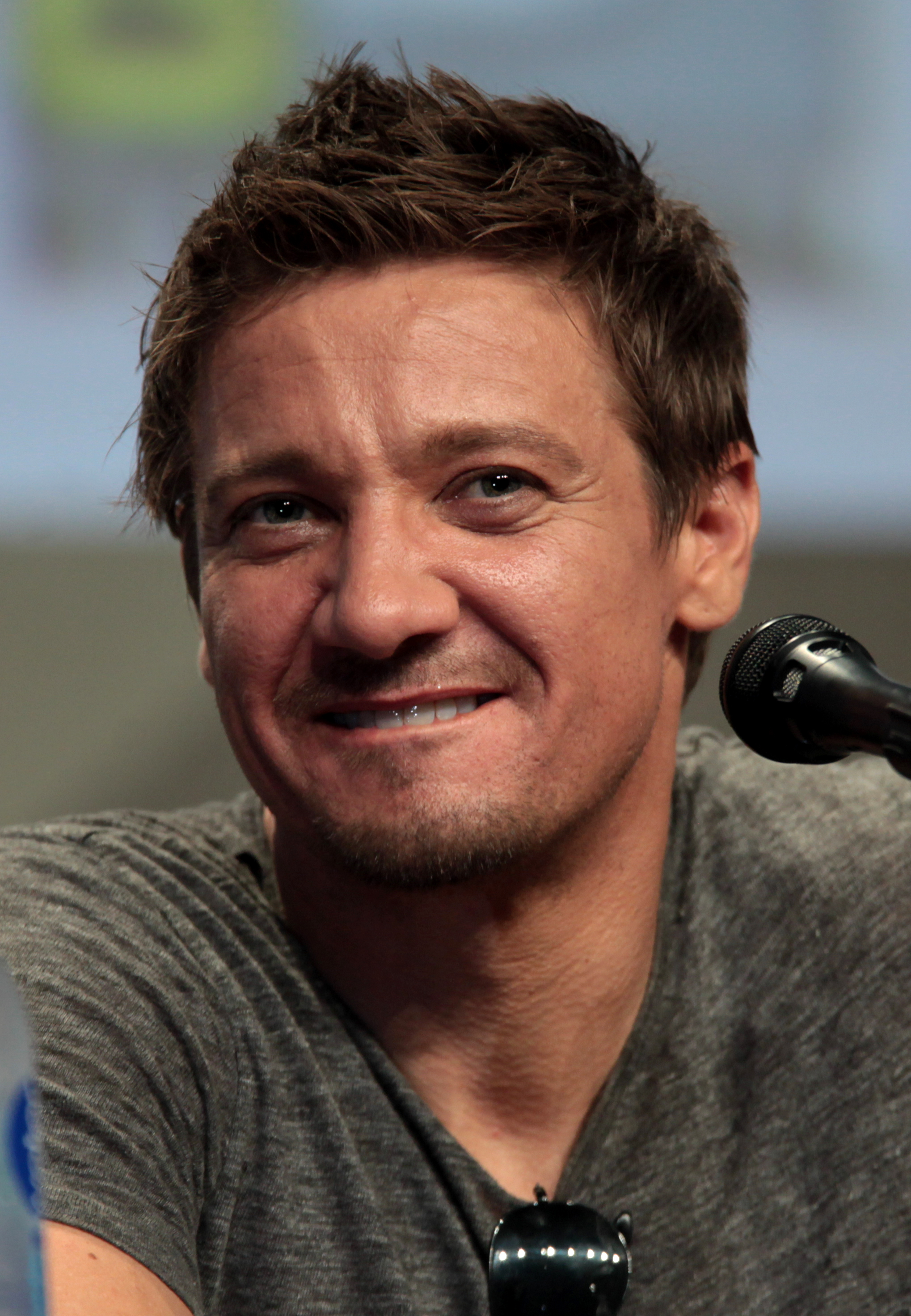
Jeremy Renner, Best Actor winner

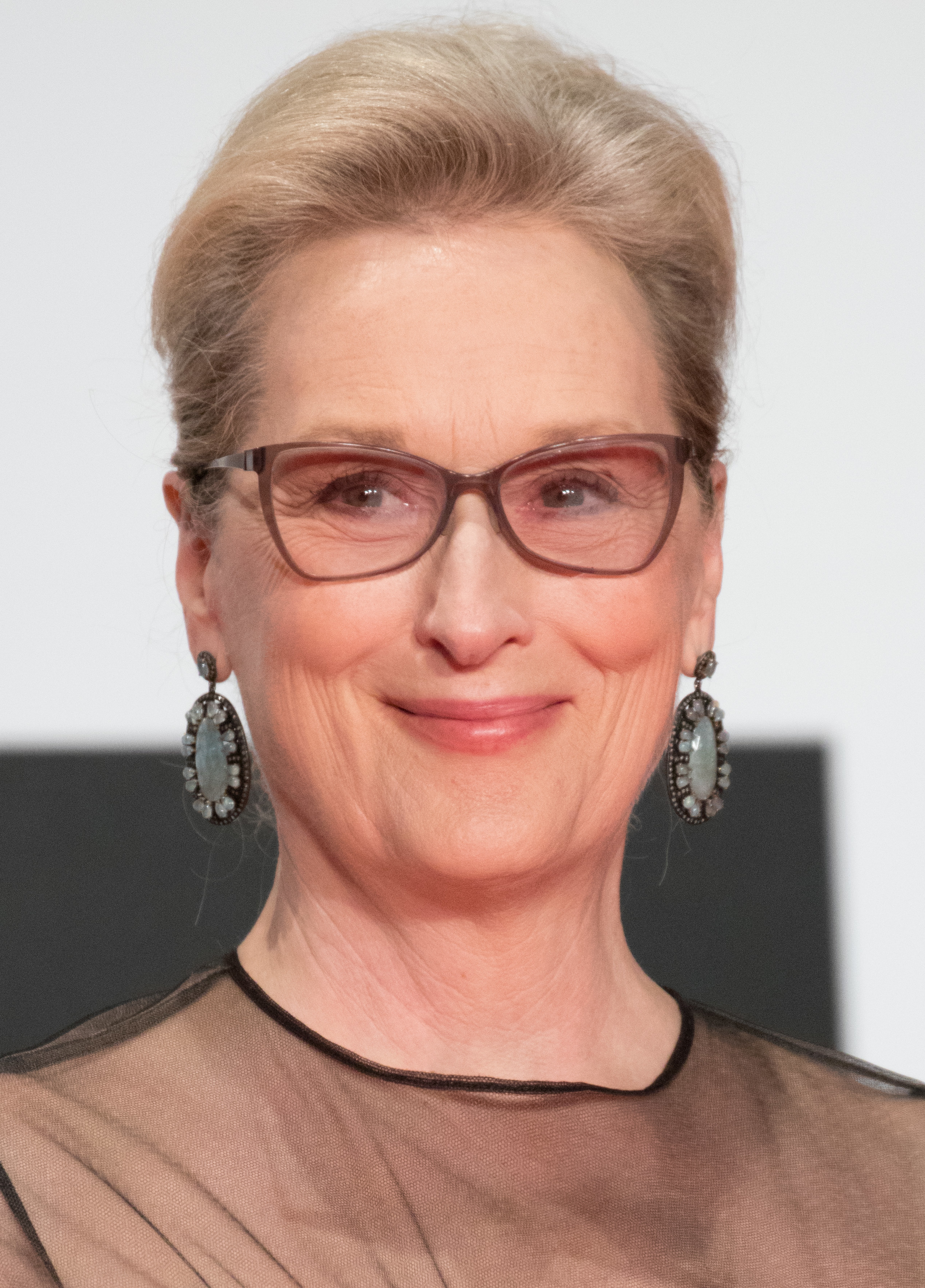
Meryl Streep, Best Actress winner

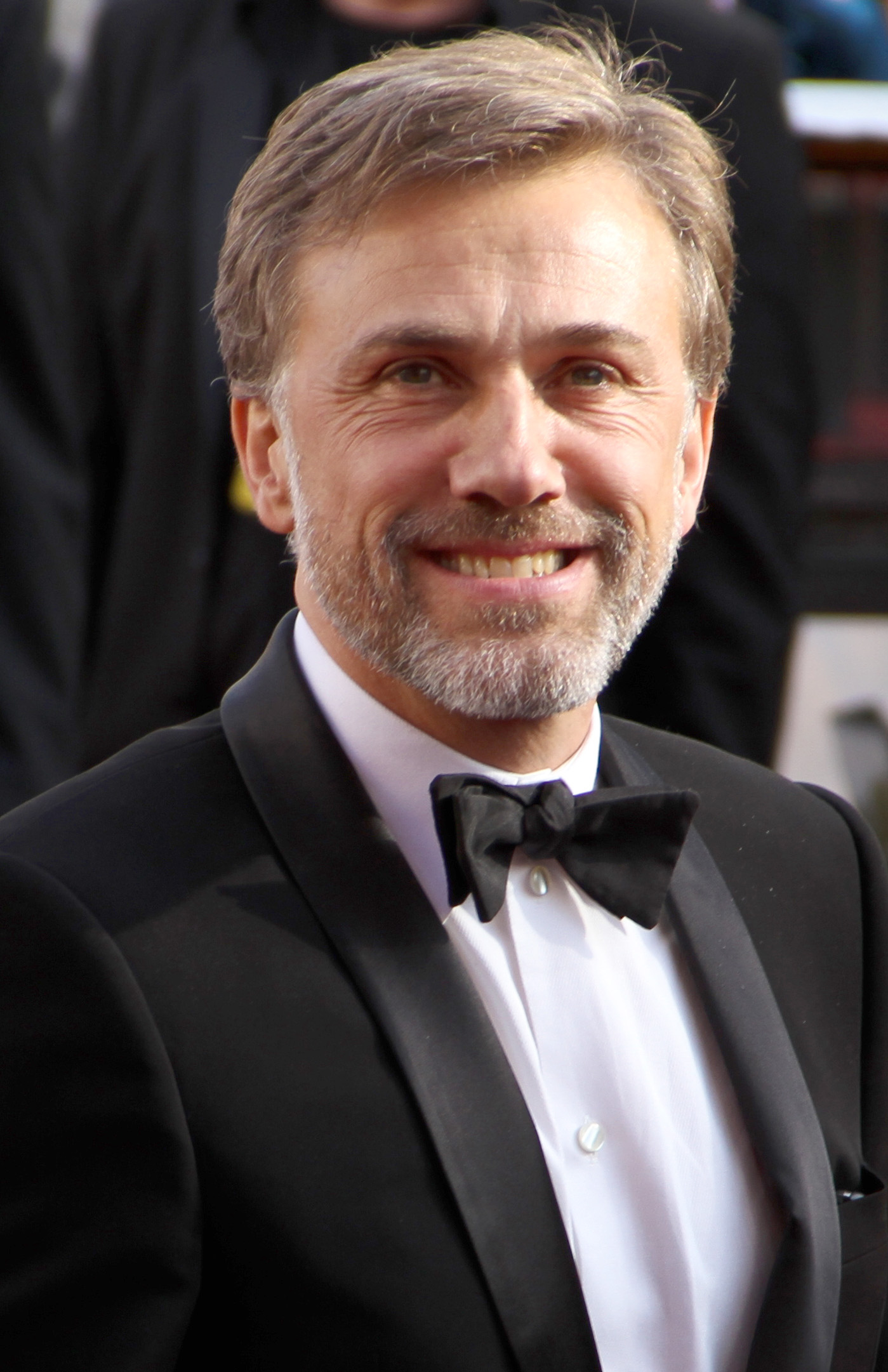
Christoph Waltz, Best Supporting Actor winner

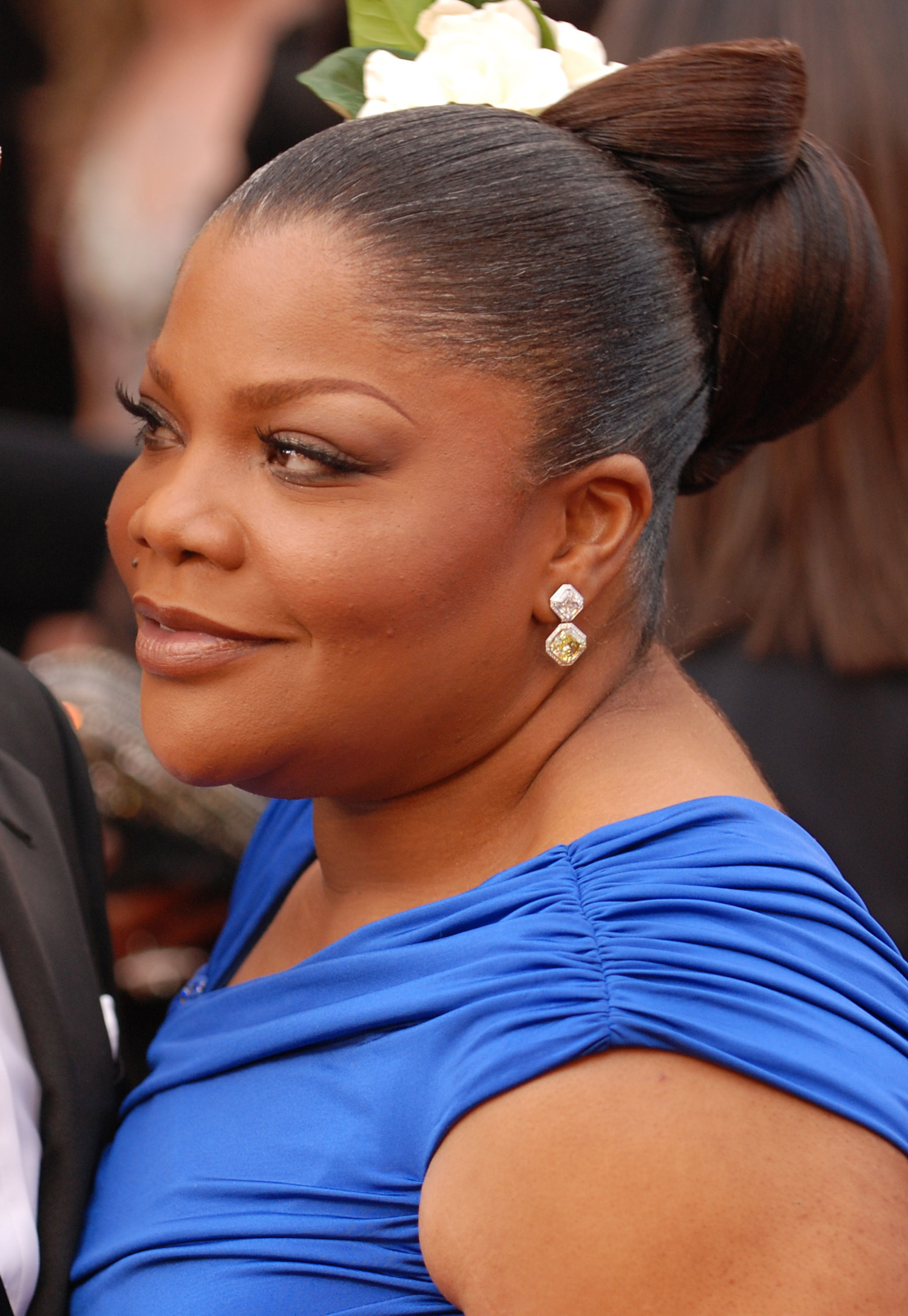
Mo'Nique, Best Supporting Actress winner

- Best Film:
  - The Hurt Locker
  - Runner-up: A Serious Man
- Best Actor:
  - Jeremy Renner – The Hurt Locker
- Best Actress:
  - Meryl Streep – Julie & Julia
  - Runner-up: Gabourey Sidibe – Precious
- Best Supporting Actor:
  - Christoph Waltz – Inglourious Basterds
  - Runner-up: Stanley Tucci – Julie & Julia
- Best Supporting Actress:
  - Mo'Nique – Precious
  - Runner-up: Anna Kendrick – Up in the Air
- Best Director:
  - Kathryn Bigelow – The Hurt Locker
- Best Screenplay:
  - Joel and Ethan Coen – A Serious Man
  - Runner-up: Mark Boal – The Hurt Locker
- Best Cinematography:
  - Barry Ackroyd – The Hurt Locker
  - Runner-up: Roger Deakins – A Serious Man
- Best Documentary:
  - The Cove
- Best Foreign-Language Film:
  - Summer Hours (L'heure d'été) • France
- Best Animated Film:
  - Up
  - Runner-up: Fantastic Mr. Fox
- Best Editing:
  - Bob Murawski and Chris Innis – The Hurt Locker
  - Runner-up: Roderick Jaynes – A Serious Man
- Best New Filmmaker:
  - Neill Blomkamp – District 9
- Best Ensemble Cast (TIE):
  - Precious
  - Star Trek
  - Runner-up: A Serious Man
- Best Use of Music in a Film:
  - Crazy Heart
