= Baby Washington =

American singer (born 1940)

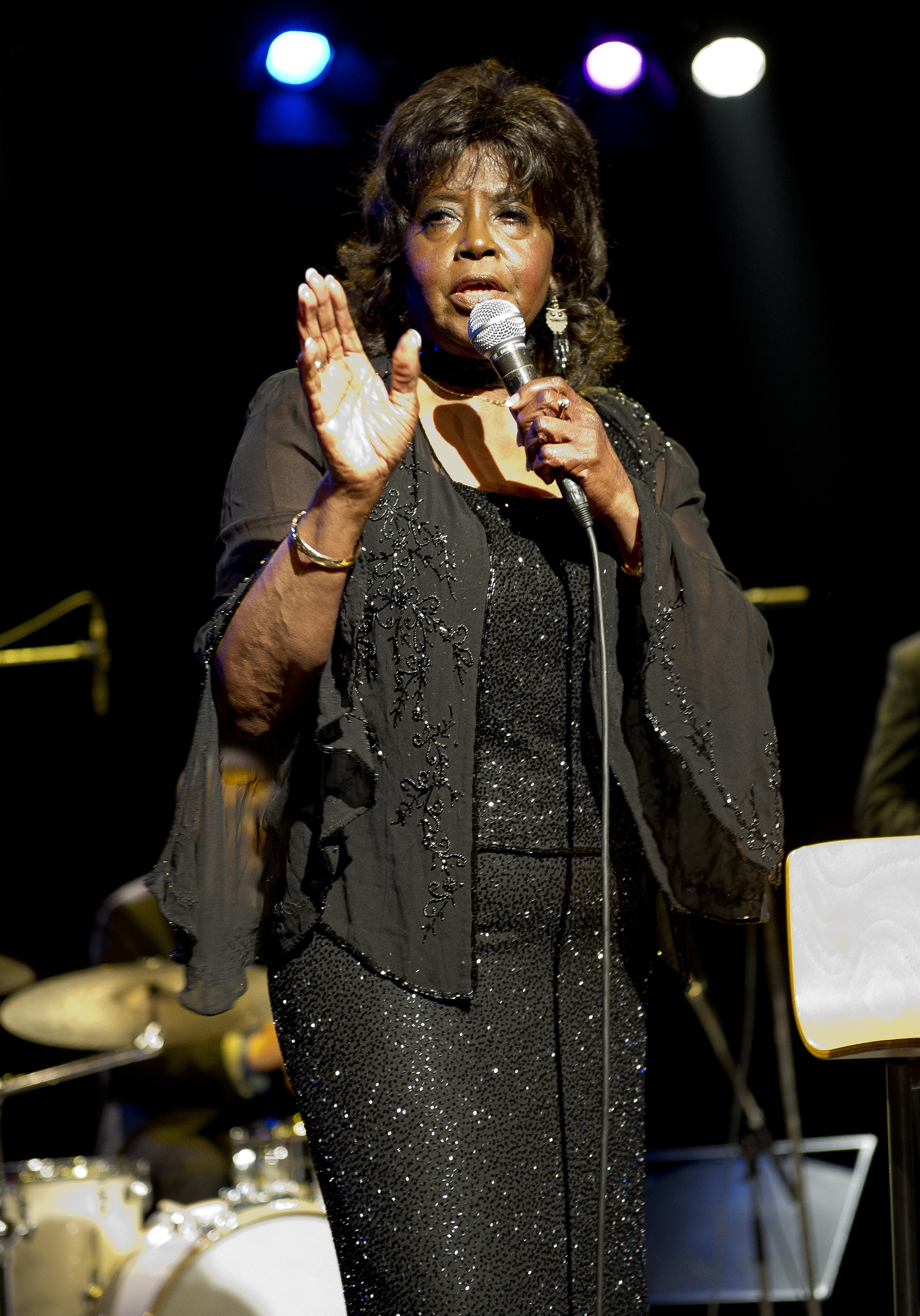
- Washington in 2014

Background information
- Also known as: Jeanette Washington
- Born: Justine Washington; 13 October 1940 (age 85); Bamberg, South Carolina, United States
- Genres: Soul, R&B
- Years active: 1956–present
- Formerly of: The Hearts; The Jaynetts

Justine Washington (born October 13, 1940), usually credited as Baby Washington, but credited on some early records as Jeanette (Baby) Washington, is an American soul music vocalist, who had 16 Billboard R&B chart entries in 15 years, most of them during the 1960s. Her biggest hit, "That's How Heartaches Are Made" in 1963, also entered the Top 40 on the Billboard Hot 100.

== Life and career ==
Washington was born in Bamberg, South Carolina, United States, and raised in Harlem, New York. In 1956, she joined the vocal group the Hearts, and also recorded for J & S Records as a member of the Jaynetts ("I Wanted To Be Free"/"Where Are You Tonight", J&S 1765/6). She first recorded solo, as Baby Washington, in 1957, on "Everyday" (J&S 1665).

In 1958, she signed to Donald Shaw's Neptune Records as a solo performer, and established herself as a soul singer with two hits in 1959: "The Time" (U.S. R&B No. 22) and "The Bells" (U.S. R&B No. 20). She followed up with the hit "Nobody Cares" (U.S. R&B No. 17) in 1961. Several of her singles on the Neptune and ABC labels were credited to Jeanette (Baby) Washington, which later led to confusion with an entirely different singer known as Jeanette Washington.

She signed with ABC Paramount in 1961, but her two releases for the label were not hits, although the self-written "Let Love Go By" later became a notable Northern soul single. Washington then moved to Juggy Murray's Sue Records in 1962, scoring her only entry on the U.S. Billboard Top 40 with "That's How Heartaches Are Made" in 1963. Two years later, she hit again on the U.S. R&B Top 10 with "Only Those In Love". Among her other Sue recordings were "I Can't Wait Until I See My Baby's Face", co-written by Chip Taylor and Jerry Ragovoy, and "Careless Hands", penned by Billy Myles.

Washington revived her career in the early 1970s covering the Marvelettes' "Forever" (No. 30 R&B) as a duet with Don Gardner. Her solo release, "I've Got To Break Away", made number 73 on the R&B chart, after which the advent of disco led to a decline in her popularity. She has never experienced great crossover recognition, although Dusty Springfield once cited Washington as her all-time favorite singer, and recorded "That's How Heartaches Are Made" and "I Can't Wait Until I See My Baby's Face".

Washington is still active as a live performer, appearing several times a year on the East Coast and performing on cruise ships. She also performed at the Prestatyn Soul Weekender festival in Wales in 2004. She performed with the Enchanters at a Philadelphia-area show in March 2008, and in Baltimore in June 2008. Washington was among the 2008 honorees in Community Works' Ladies Singing the Blues music series.

== Discography ==
=== Chart singles ===
Note: Credited as Baby Washington unless stated otherwise.

Year	Single	Chart Positions	
Year	Single	US Pop	US R&B
1959	"The Time"	-	22
1959	"The Bells (On Our Wedding Day)"	-	20
1960	"Work Out"	105	
1961	"Nobody Cares (About Me)" (Jeanette (Baby) Washington)	60	17
1962	"Handful of Memories"	116	16
1962	"Hush Heart"	102	
1963	"That's How Heartaches Are Made"	40	10
1963	"Leave Me Alone"	62	21
1963	"Hey Lonely One"	100	n/a
1964	"I Can't Wait Until I See My Baby" (Justine Washington)	93	n/a
1964	"The Clock"	100	n/a
1964	"It'll Never Be Over for Me"	98	n/a
1965	"Only Those in Love"	73	10
1969	"I Don't Know"	-	35
1973	"Forever" (Baby Washington & Don Gardner)	119	30
1973	"Just Can't Get You Out of My Mind"	-	76
1973	"I've Got to Break Away"	-	32
1975	"Can't Get Over Losing You"	-	88

=== Original studio albums ===
- That's How Heartaches Are Made (1963) Sue Records
- Only Those in Love (1965) Sue Records
- With You in Mind (1968) Veep Records (VPS 16528)
- Lay a Little Lovin' on Me—duet album with Don Gardner (1973)
- I Wanna Dance (1978) AVI Records (AVI 6038)

=== Compilation albums ===
- I've Got a Feeling (June 2005) Released by Stateside Records [Many songs featured are on CD for the first time with this release]

== See also ==
- Rhythm and Blues Foundation
- List of soul musicians
