= If You Walkin' Alone =

Single by Donna Gaines
- B-side: "Can't Understand"
- Released: 1969
- Genre: Northern soul
- Length: 2:41
- Label: Philips
- Songwriter(s): D. Gains; H. Hammerschmied

Donna Gaines singles chronology
"Wassermann" (1968)	"If You Walkin' Alone" (1969)	"Sally Go Round The Roses" (1971)

"If You Walkin' Alone" is the second single release by American singer Donna Summer, credited to her maiden name Donna Gaines (although it is misspelled as Gains).

== Background and release ==
Little appears to be known by fans about this record other than it was released in Germany in 1969 on Philips Records and was co-written by Gaines herself. The single did not chart and is now an extremely rare collector's item. It would have been released at the time Gaines was living in Germany, having moved there some years previously to star in a touring production of "Hair." She had settled in the country and sung in several other musicals, as well as with the Viennese Folk Opera. In 1971 she released another one-off single with MCA Records entitled "Sally Go Round The Roses," also a rare collector's item. In 1974 she would begin working with Giorgio Moroder and Pete Bellotte and start releasing records under her new married name - she married an Austrian actor in 1972 called Helmut Sommer, and would later anglicise his surname to create her new stage name. Summer, Moroder and Bellotte would become long-term collaborators and establish Summer as the leading female disco singer throughout the late 1970s.

== Track listing ==
Germany 7" (Philips 388 410 PF)

1. "If You Walkin' Alone" (2:41)
2. "Can't Understand" (3:48)
