= Ari Hoptman =

American actor (born 1967)

- Born: February 22, 1967 (age 59); Royal Oak, Michigan, U.S.
- Education: Doctorate in Germanic philology
- Alma mater: Wayne State University; University of Minnesota
- Known for: Acting, publications
- Notable work: A Serious Man
- Website: arihoptman.com

Ari Hoptman (born February 22, 1967) is an American actor, author, and academic, specializing in Germanic etymology, as well as a Marx Brothers historian.

== Career ==
Hoptman attended Wayne State University before moving to the Twin Cities to graduate school at the University of Minnesota. He studied Germanic philology under Anatoly Liberman, eventually earning his doctoral degree in 2002. His graduate work investigated the possible relationship between Verner's Law and certain stress patterns of Old Germanic poetry.

At the University of Minnesota, Hoptman teaches classes in the Department of German, Nordic, Scandinavian & Dutch.

Hoptman has appeared in dozens of theatre productions, plays and solo shows, mostly in comedic roles. Minnesota Public Radio called Hoptman a "great local actor", and one reviewer said he takes a dry pleasure in unusual couplings in his humor.

Portraying Ira Stone from Laughter on the 23rd Floor four different times, Hoptman has described the journalist as obnoxious, loud, rude, and late on arrival, but "a brilliant writer."

== Filmography ==
Title	Year	Character
Theater People	2013	Gary
Eden	2012	German Survivalist Leader
A Serious Man	2009	Arlen Finkle
Newtown's Disease	2006	Mr. Hungus
Two Harbors	2005	'Spock' buyer
Mystery Science Theater 3000 – Quest of the Delta Knights	1998	Pancake Breakfast Extra

== Publications ==
Hoptman's books include:

- A Bibliography of English Etymology, Volumes 1–2 with Anatoly Liberman and Nathan E. Carlson
- Die erste Reise
- Sprachbau: Grammatik und Arbeitsheft Fur Das Dritte Jahr
- The Mood of the Tales are Gloomy
- Verner's Law, Stress, and the Accentuation of Old Germanic Poetry

Hoptman's work has been used or referrnced in a number of books and journals, including:

- 1001 Secrets Every Birder Should Know: Tips and Trivia for the Backyard and Beyond by Sharon Stiteler
- Amsterdamer Beiträge zur älteren Germanistik, Volumes 54-55
- An Analytic Dictionary of the English Etymology: An Introduction by Anatoly Liberman
- Current projects in historical lexicography
- Interdisciplinary Journal for Germanic Linguistics and Semiotic Analysis, Volume 4
- Intermediate Dutch: A Grammar and Workbook by Jenneke A. Oosterhoff
- Linguistics and Language Behavior Abstracts: LLBA., Volume 36, Issue 1
- North-western European Language Evolution: NOWELE., Volumes 36–37
- Sociological Abstracts, Volume 50, Issue 2

Hoptman is mentioned for his acting in:

- The Dude Abides: The Gospel According to the Coen Brothers by Cathleen Falsani
- The Princeton Seventh by James Vculek.
