= The World We Live In (album) =

Studio album by Voice Farm
- Released: 1982
- Label: Optional Music
- Producer: David Kahne

Voice Farm chronology
The World We Live In (1982)	Voice Farm (1987)

Professional ratings
Review scores
Source	Rating
AllMusic	2.5/5 stars

The World We Live In is the 1982 debut album from the San Francisco-based, new wave group Voice Farm, released on Optional Music. It includes "Beatnik", which AllMusic called catchy, and the album-closing Over and Over, which "masterfully blends a lyrical theme of obsession with relentless, ominous bass tones". Also included is a synthesizer driven cover of The Jaynetts' 1963 hit "Sally Go 'Round the Roses".

== Track listing ==
1. "A.M. City" – 2:52
2. "Lost Adults" – 4:12
3. "Beatnik" – 3:26
4. "Davy's Big Battle" – 2:55
5. "Mama Made Me Do It" – 1:34
6. "Sally Go 'Round the Roses" – 3:51
7. "Double Garage" – 3:15
8. "Follow Me Home" – 2:32
9. "Voyeur" – 3:04
10. "Cheeno" – 0:54
11. "Over and Over" – 3:33
