= Ronald I. Meshbesher =

American lawyer

Ronald I. Meshbesher (May 18, 1933 – June 13, 2018) was an American lawyer and the founder and president of the Minnesota law firm Meshbesher & Spence.

== Early life and career ==
Upon graduating from the University of Minnesota Law School, Meshbesher began practicing law at the age of 24 in the Hennepin County Attorney's Office as a prosecutor, where he tried 45 felony cases in his first three years with a 92% conviction rate. He founded the law firm of Meshbesher & Spence in 1961. The Minneapolis Star Tribune called him "a dean of the Minnesota criminal-defense bar for 45 years".

In 1992 Mr. Meshbesher wrote the Trial Handbook for Minnesota Lawyers. He also founded or served as president or vice president of numerous legal associations, including the Minnesota Association of Criminal Defense Lawyers, the National Association of Criminal Defense Lawyers (1984–85) and the American Board of Criminal Lawyers. he died of Alzheimer's disease in Minnesota on June 13 2018.

== In popular culture ==
The Joel and Ethan Coen film A Serious Man shot a scene at Meshbesher's Minneapolis law office and mentions "Ron Meshbesher" as an attorney in the film.
