= Surrealistic Pillow =

Studio album by Jefferson Airplane
- Released: February 1, 1967
- Recorded: October 31 – November 22, 1966
- Studios: RCA Victor (Hollywood, California)
- Genres: Folk rock; acid rock; psychedelic rock; blues rock
- Length: 33:40
- Label: RCA Victor
- Producer: Rick Jarrard

Jefferson Airplane chronology
Jefferson Airplane Takes Off (1966)	Surrealistic Pillow (1967)	After Bathing at Baxter's (1967)

Singles from Surrealistic Pillow
- 1. "My Best Friend" Released: December 1966; 2. "Somebody to Love" Released: February 1967; 3. "White Rabbit" Released: June 1967

Surrealistic Pillow is the second studio album by the American rock band Jefferson Airplane, released on February 1, 1967, by RCA Victor. It is the first album by the band with vocalist Grace Slick and drummer Spencer Dryden. The album peaked at number three on the Billboard 200 and has been certified Platinum by the Recording Industry Association of America (RIAA). It is considered to be one of the most influential and quintessential works of the early psychedelic rock era and 1960s counterculture.

"My Best Friend" was released as the first single in December 1966 but only reached No. 103 on the Billboard Bubbling Under chart. Two more singles were released in the spring of 1967: "Somebody to Love" and "White Rabbit" peaked respectively at number five and number eight on the Billboard Hot 100 chart and are the band's only Top 40 hits on that chart. "Today" was not released as a single but was played often on college radio and rock stations and remains one of their most popular songs. In 2024, the album was inducted into the National Recording Registry by the Library of Congress for being “culturally, historically, or aesthetically significant”.

== Background ==
Early drummer Alexander "Skip" Spence left the band in mid-1966. He was replaced by Spencer Dryden, an experienced Los Angeles jazz drummer and the half-nephew of Charlie Chaplin. New female vocalist Grace Slick, formerly with another San Francisco rock band The Great Society, joined Jefferson Airplane in October 1966. Slick, Dryden, male lead vocalist-guitarist-songwriter and founder of band Marty Balin, guitarist-vocalist-songwriter Paul Kantner, lead guitarist (and occasional vocalist) Jorma Kaukonen, and bassist Jack Casady formed the core of the best-known line-up of the group, which remained stable until Dryden's departure in early 1970.

== Songs and recording ==
A mere two weeks after Grace Slick joined the band, the group entered RCA Victor studios in Hollywood on October 31 to record their second album. Working with producer Rick Jarrard, the group recorded album opener "She Has Funny Cars" featuring Jack Casady on fuzz bass and the mellow folk-rocker "My Best Friend", written by departed member Skip Spence and chosen as the album's lead-off single. On November 1 they recorded Balin's "Plastic Fantastic Lover", his ode to a television set penned after a visit to a plastics factory in Chicago while the band was on tour. This was followed the next day by his love ballad "Today", which purportedly featured Jerry Garcia on lead guitar, laid down in a single take and soon to be a popular live staple. On November 3 a Slick composition she brought from her time in The Great Society, "White Rabbit", was recorded with its original instrumental introduction drastically shortened for commercial purposes; it was among the first explicitly pro-drug rock songs and would go on to become her signature piece, used in countless movies and TV shows since. On the next day the Balin rocker "3/5 of a Mile in 10 Seconds", which the band had already been featuring in its shows since September, was committed to tape. Marty claimed the title came from seeing two different phrases in the sports section of the newspaper, one for "3/5 of a mile" and another for "10 seconds", which he combined at random. The high price of "real clean, real fine nicotine" in the lyrics was a veiled reference to marijuana.

After a short break to play some gigs the group reconvened at RCA on November 14 to record another Spence composition, "J.P.P. McStep B. Blues", which was ultimately left in the can; the group would sporadically play it on stage, sometimes in a medley with the later "Wooden Ships". Spence was present for this session, which also saw the recording of The Mamas & the Papas soundalike "How Do You Feel" written by Kantner friend Tom Mastin. On the following day "Somebody to Love", another song from the Great Society penned by Slick's brother-in-law Darby and given a new, punchier arrangement by Garcia, was captured in 13 takes along with Kantner's chiming, Byrdsian folk-rocker "D.C.B.A.-25" (the title referring to the song's chord progression, with the number 25 an oblique reference to LSD-25). On November 16, the band recorded Balin's "Comin' Back to Me", a gentle acoustic-baroque ballad penned that very day after having smoked a particularly strong joint given to him by Paul Butterfield and featuring only himself, Casady, and Garcia plus Slick on recorder, as they were the only musicians left in the studio that night." Two outtakes, the driving Kantner-Estes acid-rocker "Go to Her" (which had also been attempted for the debut album) and slow Kaukonen blues "In the Morning", were taped on the 17th and 21st with the album's final song, the acoustic fingerpicking showcase "Embryonic Journey" penned by Kaukonen some five years prior, added on November 22 at the insistence of Jarrard.

As producer, Jarrard was under orders by RCA to produce something commercial, so none of the longer covers and psychedelic instrumental jams the group had been featuring on stage, such as "Fat Angel", "Thing", and "The Other Side of This Life", were attempted. He forbade the group to smoke marijuana at the sessions, an edict that was ignored and which contributed to the group not re-hiring him for subsequent albums; they disparaged him behind his back as a company man, although Slick stated she was "knocked out" when she heard the final product. Jarrard also bathed the stereo mix of the album in swathes of reverb, a controversial choice which has led some to prefer the drier mono mix.

Some controversy exists as to the role of Garcia in the making of the album. His reputed presence on several tracks is denied by producer Jarrard, but he is credited on the RCA label copy and received credits on the Flight Log compilation and the Jefferson Airplane Loves You box set. In the sleeve notes for Early Flight, a 1974 compilation album of previously unreleased material, manager Bill Thompson writes only that Garcia was "listed as 'spiritual advisor' on the album cover [and] played one of the guitars" on "In the Morning". Garcia himself recalled in a mid-1967 interview that he played the high lead on "Today" in addition to playing guitar on two other songs ("Plastic Fantastic Lover" and "Comin' Back to Me") and rearranging "Somebody to Love." He also played on "J.P.P. McStep B. Blues" (included on Early Flight and the 2003 CD reissue) and may have played on "How Do You Feel". In his autobiography, Jorma Kaukonen said of Garcia, "I used to think about him as co-producer, but now that I really know what a producer is, the producer of that record was Rick Jarrard. Jerry was a combination arranger, musician, and sage counsel."

== Style ==
The overall style of Surrealistic Pillow has been categorized as "folk-rock-based psychedelia". The material is said to be "both melodic and complex." The style on the album's closing track, "Plastic Fantastic Lover," has been described as "quasi-electronica." The album's fourth track, "Today," has been described as a "delicate ballad". The track "D.C.B.A.-25" contains elements of what is said to be "proto-country-rock" and "3/5 of a Mile in 10 Seconds" contains elements of blues rock.

== Title and artwork ==
San Francisco photographer Herb Greene photographed the band for the album's cover art in his dining room, whose walls were covered in primitive quasi-hieroglyphics. Marty Balin had wanted the cover tinted in blue but RCA overrode him and chose pink instead, although he liked the change. The back cover was a psychedelic photo collage of the band members picked from shots taken at the same Greene photo session, also assembled by Balin. A comment to Marty by Garcia about the music being "as surrealistic as a pillow" inspired the album title.

== Release ==
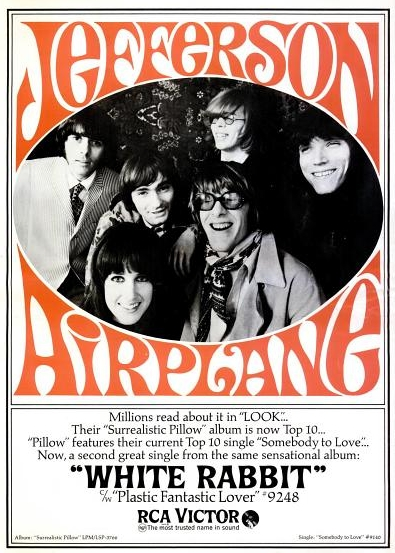
A promotional poster for the single "White Rabbit"

The album was initially released on LP record by RCA Victor in different stereo (LSP-3766), and mono (LPM-3766) editions. The stereo mixes include heavier use of reverberation effects than the mono. The mono version was deleted in the late 1960s and remained unavailable until 2001. The first United Kingdom release replaced some original songs with tracks from the group's first US LP, Jefferson Airplane Takes Off.

The album was initially slow to take off until the release of "Somebody to Love" in March. Heavy radio play took the song into the Billboard top 5, aided by the group's first national TV appearances on The Smothers Brothers Comedy Hour on May 7 and American Bandstand on June 3, the former appearance featuring a facsimile of the group's swirling light show, the first time the average American had seen such effects. The album entered the Billboard top 10 in May and peaked at number three on August 5, with the help of the follow-up single "White Rabbit".

Jefferson Airplane's fusion of folk rock and psychedelia was original at the time, in line with musical developments pioneered by the Beatles, the Byrds, the Beach Boys, the Mamas & the Papas, Bob Dylan, and the Yardbirds, among other mid-1960s rock bands. Surrealistic Pillow was the first blockbuster psychedelic album by a band from San Francisco, announcing to the world the active bohemian scene that had developed there starting with the Beats during the 1950s, extending and changing through the 1960s into the Haight-Ashbury counterculture. Subsequent exposure generated by Jefferson Airplane and others wrought great changes to the counterculture. By 1968, the ensuing national media attention had precipitated a very different San Francisco scene than had existed in 1966.

In January 2017, "Somebody to Love" received a gold certification from the Recording Industry Association of America, while "White Rabbit" received a platinum certification.

== Critical reception and legacy ==
Professional ratings
Review scores
Source	Rating
AllMusic	5/5 stars
The Absolute Sound	5/5 stars
The Daily Vault	A−
Encyclopedia of Popular Music	5/5 stars
The Village Voice	B+

On initial release, the album received positive reviews. Billboard said of "Somebody to Love" that it was a "hard driver, featuring powerful female vocal lead, that never stops from start to finish." Similarly, the magazine said of "White Rabbit" that it was a "change-of-pace number" with "intriguing lyric content and driving beat in strong support". Cash Box wrote of the album that "the LP could easily go all the way to the top of the chart" and "should be especially popular with the teen set". Robert Christgau of The Village Voice gave it a B+ although he critiqued the lyrics, claiming "the sarcasm is as vapid as the optimism".

A live version of "Plastic Fantastic Lover" was released as a single in 1969. Billboard described it as "heavy hard rock". Cash Box wrote that it "features the team's more commercial-than-controversial style" and has "a solid instrumental track and very fine vocal". Record World wrote it was one of the band's favorites.

Just as The Beach Boys gave listeners a glimpse of southern California surf culture in the early 1960s, Jefferson Airplane's Surrealistic Pillow painted a musical picture of the free-thinking Summer of Love. [...] Like fellow San Franciscans The Grateful Dead, Jefferson Airplane combined the folk esthetic and some of its form with a determinedly electric approach.

— Yoshi Kato of San Jose Mercury News, as quoted from the book 1001 Albums You Must Hear Before You Die (2005)

In subsequent years the reputation of the album has continued to grow. Bruce Eder of AllMusic gave the album a perfect score, calling "every song [...] a perfectly cut diamond". He expressed his view that the album was a "shot heard around the world" and that the group never released anything of the same quality again in their career, adding that "few artists from the era ever did". In 2003, the album was ranked number 146 on Rolling Stone magazine's list of the "500 Greatest Albums of All Time", maintaining the rating in a 2012 revised list, and dropping to number 471 in the 2020 revised list. It was voted number 174 in Colin Larkin's All Time Top 1000 Albums.

Surrealistic Pillow was included in the book 101 Essential Rock Records, where music historian Jeff Gold lauded the album's musicianship (particularly the stylings of Kaukonen and Casady), and stated his belief that Jefferson Airplane "remade pop history" with the album.

=== Reissues ===
The first compact disc releases were in Japan in 1987 and the U.S. in 1988. A 2001 re-issue by RCA was released as a limited edition gold CD and contained both the stereo and mono recordings. Both mixes were later included as part of the Ignition box set on a standard aluminum CD.

Another stereo reissue appeared on August 19, 2003, with six bonus tracks, including the mono A-sides of "Somebody to Love" and "White Rabbit". The 2003 reissue was produced by Bob Irwin.

== Track listing ==
=== Original release ===
Side one
No.	Title	Writer(s)	Lead vocals	Length
1.	"She Has Funny Cars"	Jorma Kaukonen, Marty Balin	Balin and Slick	3:03
2.	"Somebody to Love"	Darby Slick	Slick	2:54
3.	"My Best Friend"	Skip Spence	Balin, Kantner, and Slick	2:59
4.	"Today"	Balin, Paul Kantner	Balin	2:57
5.	"Comin' Back to Me"	Balin	Balin	5:18

Side two
No.	Title	Writer(s)	Lead vocals	Length
6.	"3/5 of a Mile in 10 Seconds"	Balin	Balin and Slick	3:39
7.	"D.C.B.A.–25"	Kantner	Kantner and Slick	2:33
8.	"How Do You Feel"	Tom Mastin	Kantner	3:26
9.	"Embryonic Journey"	Kaukonen	None	1:51
10.	"White Rabbit"	Grace Slick	Slick	2:27
11.	"Plastic Fantastic Lover"	Balin	Balin	2:33

2003 reissue bonus tracks
No.	Title	Writer(s)	Lead vocals	Length
12.	"In the Morning"	Kaukonen	Kaukonen	6:21
13.	"J.P.P. McStep B. Blues"	Spence	Balin, Kantner, and Slick	2:37
14.	"Go to Her"	Kantner, Irving Estes	Balin, Kantner, and Slick	4:02
15.	"Come Back Baby"	Traditional; arranged by Kaukonen	Kaukonen	2:56
16.	"Somebody to Love" (mono single version)	Darby Slick	Slick	2:58
17.	"White Rabbit" (mono single version; song ends at 2:33; 2:40 begins "D. C. B. A.-25" [alternate backing track])	Grace Slick	Slick	5:21

=== 1967 UK release ===
Side one

1. "My Best Friend"
2. "3/5 of a Mile in 10 Seconds"
3. "D.C.B.A. – 25"
4. "How Do You Feel"
5. "Embryonic Journey"
6. "Don't Slip Away" (Balin, Spence) (Note: These tracks were originally issued in the U.S. on Jefferson Airplane Takes Off.)

Side two

7. "Come Up the Years" (Balin, Kantner)
8. "Chauffeur Blues" (Lester Melrose)
9. "Today"
10. "Comin' Back to Me"
11. "Somebody to Love"

== Personnel ==
Jefferson Airplane

- Marty Balin – vocals, guitar, album design
- Jack Casady – bass guitar, fuzz bass, rhythm guitar
- Spencer Dryden – drums, percussion
- Paul Kantner – rhythm guitar, vocals
- Jorma Kaukonen – lead guitar, vocals
- Grace Slick – vocals, piano, organ, recorder
- Signe Toly Anderson – lead vocals on "Chauffeur Blues" (UK only)
- Skip Spence – drums on "Don't Slip Away," "Come Up the Years," and "Chauffeur Blues" (UK only)

Additional personnel

- Jerry Garcia – "musical and spiritual advisor"; guitar on "Today", "Comin' Back to Me", "Plastic Fantastic Lover", "In the Morning", and "J. P. P. McStep B. Blues"
- Herb Greene – photography
- David Hassinger – audio engineer
- Rick Jarrard – record producer

== Charts ==
Chart (1967)	Peak position
Finnish Albums (The Official Finnish Charts)	14
Norwegian Albums (VG-lista)	20
US Billboard 200	3

== Certifications ==
Region	Certification	Certified units/sales
Italy (FIMI) Sales + streams since 2009	Gold	25,000^{‡}
United Kingdom (BPI) 2003 release	Silver	60,000^{‡}
United States (RIAA)	Platinum	1,000,000^{‡}
^{‡} Sales+streaming figures based on certification alone.
