= Peter van Gelder =

American sitarist and musician

Peter Van Gelder
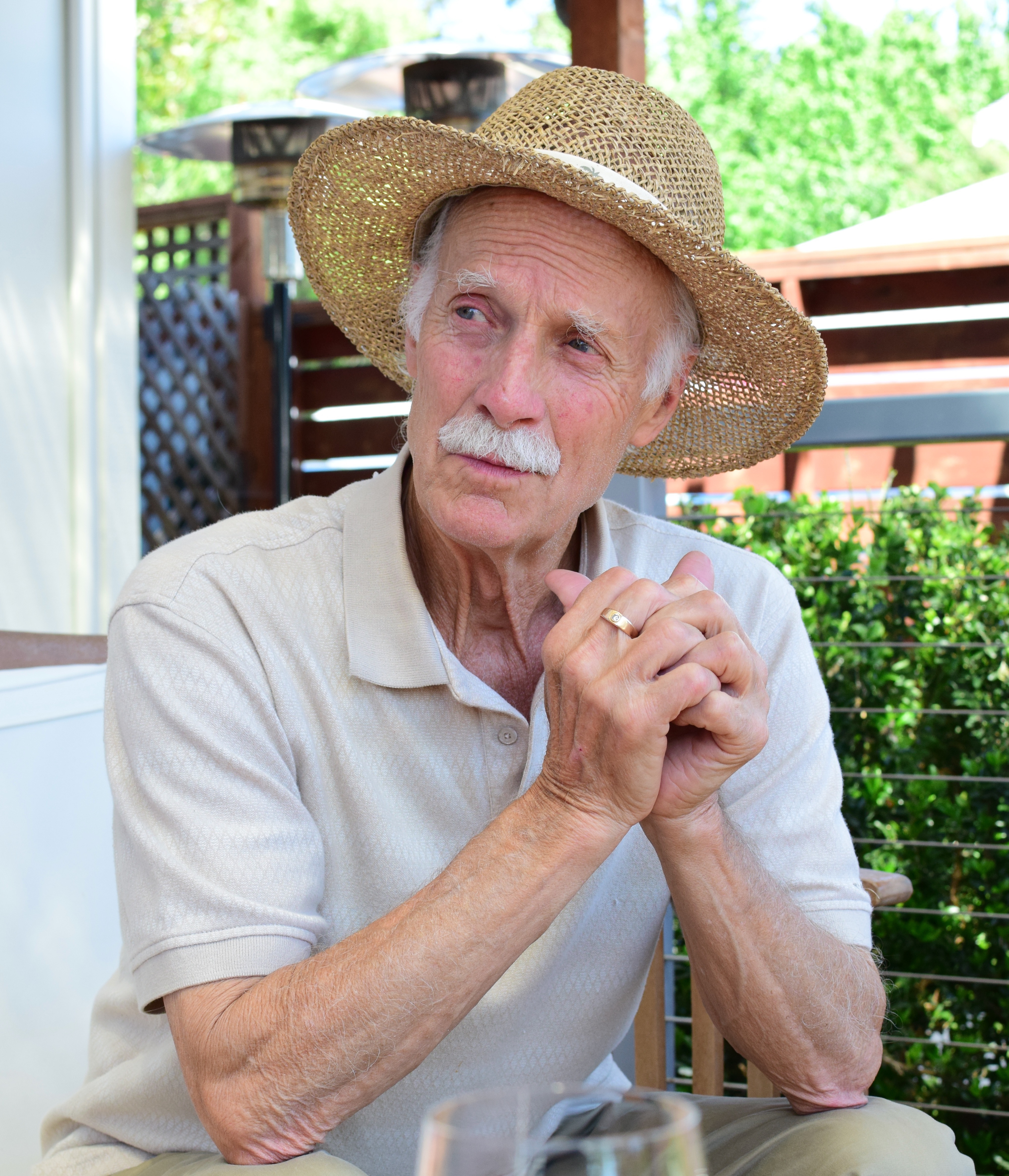
- Van Gelder in 2019

Background information
- Born: Peter Van Gelder; 19 March 1940 (age 86)
- Genres: Psychedelic rock; folk music; Indian music
- Occupations: Musician, educator
- Instruments: Sitar, saxophone, bass guitar, flute, theremin
- Years active: 2005–present
- Formerly of: The Great Society
- Website: https://petervangelder.com/

Peter Van Gelder (born March 19, 1940) is a sitarist and musician who played saxophone and bass in The Great Society.

Van Gelder moved to San Francisco after college and learned bass to play in The Great Society; he played saxophone on White Rabbit. He became interested in Indian music after working at a San Francisco radio station and took a summer class at University of California Berkeley with Ali Akbar Khan where he learned to play sitar. Deciding to continue his studies with Khan in Kolkata, he lived in India for three years and became a disciple of Ali Akbar Khan. While in India, he met other musicians with whom he formed the band The Saddhu Brand when he returned to California.

He is an instructor at the Ali Akbar College of Music in San Rafael, California.

== Early life ==
Van Gelder grew up in a household where his parents listened to Western classical music. He played clarinet and trumpet as a child.
