= Over the Mountain; Across the Sea =

1957 song performed by Johnnie & Joe

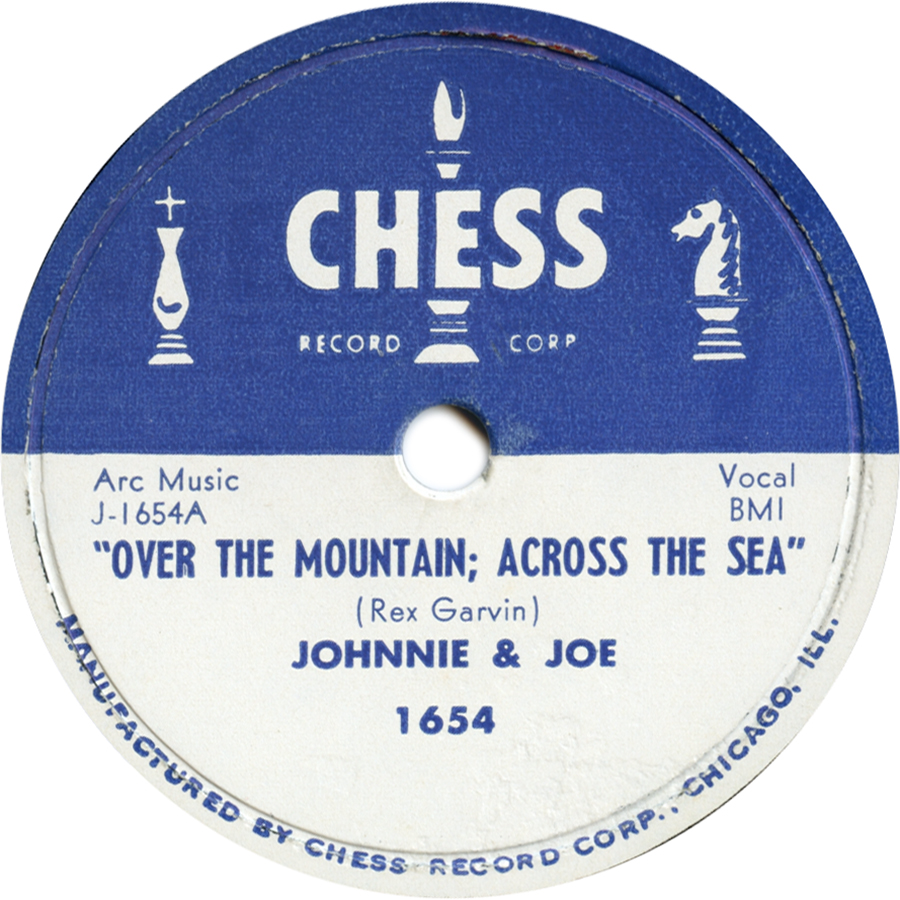

Single by Johnnie & Joe
- B-side: "My Baby's Gone, On, On"
- Released: April 1957
- Genre: R&B, doo wop
- Length: 2:15
- Label: Chess
- Songwriter: Rex Garvin

Johnnie & Joe singles chronology
"It Was There" (1957)	"Over the Mountain; Across the Sea" (1957)	"I Was So Lonely" (1957)

"Over the Mountain; Across the Sea" is a song written by Rex Garvin. The song was a hit for Johnnie & Joe in 1957 and Bobby Vinton in 1963.

== Johnnie & Joe version ==
"Over the Mountain; Across the Sea" was originally released by Johnnie & Joe in 1957. Johnnie & Joe's version reached No. 8 on Billboard's "Top 100 Sides" chart, No. 3 on Billboard's chart of "R&B Best Sellers in Stores", and No. 6 on Billboard's chart of "Most Played R&B by Jockeys".

== Bobby Vinton version ==
Bobby Vinton released a cover of the song in 1963. Vinton's version spent 10 weeks on the Billboard Hot 100 chart, peaking at No. 21, while reaching No. 8 on Billboard's Middle-Road Singles chart, and No. 2 on Canada's CHUM Hit Parade.

=== Charts ===
Chart (1963)	Peak position
U.S. Billboard Hot 100	21

== Other versions ==
Skip & Flip released a version of the song as the B-side to their 1962 single "One More Drink for Julie".

"Over the Mountain; Across the Sea"

Single by Bobby Vinton

from the album The Greatest Hits of the Golden Groups
- B-side: "My Baby's Gone, On, On"
- Released: February 15, 1963
- Recorded: 1962
- Genre: Easy listening
- Length: 2:26
- Label: Epic
- Songwriter: Rex Garvin

Bobby Vinton singles chronology
"Let's Kiss and Make Up" (1962)	"Over the Mountain; Across the Sea" (1963)	"Blue on Blue" (1963)

== In popular culture ==
The song was briefly played at the ending of La Bamba, just before the radio announced the death of Ritchie Valens.

The Bobby Vinton cover of the song features at the beginning of the 2021 film, Godzilla vs. Kong.

In a Volkswagen commercial, a lighthouse keeper while getting his mail plays the song while driving to and from the mailbox.
