= Johnnie & Joe =

American R&B vocal duo

- Origin: The Bronx, New York, USA
- Genre: R&B
- Years active: 1957–1988
- Label: Chess Records (under lease from J & S Records)
- Past members: Johnnie Richardson, Joe Rivers

Johnnie & Joe were an American R&B vocal duo from The Bronx, New York, United States, who were best known for their 1957 hit "Over the Mountain; Across the Sea."

== History ==
Johnnie Louise Richardson (June 29, 1935, Montgomery, Alabama – October 25, 1988, New York City) and Joe Rivers (March 20, 1937, Charleston, South Carolina – August 26, 2025, Suffern, New York) began singing together in 1957 and released several singles on Chess Records, which were leased from J & S Records, to whom the duo were under contract. Richardson was the daughter of the J & S label owner, Zelma "Zell" Sanders, who had been a touring member of The Hearts.

Richardson and Rivers resumed their professional partnership later in the 1960s. During the 1970s and '80s they performed in oldies concerts, and made a critically acclaimed album, Kingdom of Love, in 1982. Johnnie Richardson died of complications from a stroke in 1988.

== Discography ==
Three of the songs hit the U.S. singles charts. "Over the Mountain; Across the Sea," written by Rex Garvin, went to #3 on the R&B chart and #8 on the Billboard Hot 100, and "I'll Be Spinning," written by Freddie Scott, went Top 10 R&B, both in 1957. "My Baby's Gone," a #15 R&B hit, was their last hit, although "Over the Mountain, Across the Sea" returned to the pop charts in 1960, peaking at #89 the second time around.
