= Comin' Back to Me =

Song by Jefferson Airplane

Song by Jefferson Airplane

from the album Surrealistic Pillow
- Released: 1967
- Recorded: November 1, 1966
- Genre: Psychedelic folk
- Length: 5:14
- Label: RCA Victor
- Songwriter(s): Marty Balin
- Producer(s): Rick Jarrard

"Comin' Back to Me" is a psychedelic folk song by the American rock band Jefferson Airplane. It was written by Marty Balin. The song appeared on Jefferson Airplane's second album, Surrealistic Pillow. Marty Balin recalls that "the song was created while he indulged in some primo-grade marijuana given to him by blues singer Paul Butterfield." After writing the song in one sitting, he immediately went to the studio to record his composition with any available musicians at the studio. The song would later be covered by Rickie Lee Jones and Richie Havens.

It has appeared on the soundtrack of a number of American feature films including Flashback (1990), The Indian Runner (1991), Without Limits (1998), Girl, Interrupted (1999), Moonlight Mile (2002), A Serious Man (2009), and The Age of Adaline (2015).

== Personnel ==
- Jerry Garcia – guitar
- Marty Balin – lead vocals, guitar
- Paul Kantner – guitar
- Jack Casady – guitar
- Grace Slick – recorder

The mono mix of this song brings out a bass guitar part that, presumably, would have been played by Jack Casady.

== Cover versions ==
- Balin released a new version on his 1999 solo album Marty Balin Greatest Hits.
- In 1991, Rickie Lee Jones covered the song on her album Pop Pop.
