= Somebody to Love (Jefferson Airplane song) =

1967 rock single by Jefferson Airplane

"Someone to Love"

Single by The Great!! Society!!
- B-side: "Free Advice"
- Released: February 1966
- Recorded: December 4, 1965
- Length: 2:01
- Label: Northbeach
- Songwriter: Darby Slick

The Great!! Society!! singles chronology
"My Best Friend" (1966)	"Someone to Love" (1966)	"Didn't Think So" / "Sally Go 'Round the Roses" (1968)

"Somebody to Love" (originally titled "Someone to Love") is a rock song written by Darby Slick, originally recorded by the Great Society, and later by Jefferson Airplane. Rolling Stone magazine ranked Jefferson Airplane's version No. 274 on their list of the 500 Greatest Songs of All Time.

== Background ==
Written by the Great Society guitarist Darby Slick after realizing his girlfriend had left him, and first performed by that band, which included his then-sister-in-law Grace Slick on vocals, the song made little impact outside of the club circuit in the Bay Area. The song was recorded on December 4, 1965, and released in February 1966 as a single with the B-side, another Darby Slick composition titled "Free Advice" on the Northbeach Records label (Northbeach 1001) and received minimal circulation outside of San Francisco. San Francisco in the mid-1960s was the center of free love, but Darby Slick saw a downside to this ethos, as it could lead to jealousy and disconnect. The song champions loyalty and monogamy, as the singer implores the listener to find that one true love that will nurture them and get them through the tough times.

== Jefferson Airplane version ==
"Somebody to Love"
- Side A of the 1968 US reissue

Single by Jefferson Airplane

from the album Surrealistic Pillow
- B-side: "She Has Funny Cars"
- Released: February 1967
- Recorded: November 3, 1966
- Studio: RCA Victor (Hollywood, California)
- Genre: Psychedelic rock; hard rock
- Length: 2:54
- Label: RCA Victor
- Songwriter: Darby Slick
- Producer: Rick Jarrard

Jefferson Airplane singles chronology
"My Best Friend" (1966)	"Somebody to Love" (1967)	"White Rabbit" (1967)

Audio
- "Somebody to Love" on YouTube

When Grace Slick departed to join Jefferson Airplane, she took this song with her, bringing it to the Surrealistic Pillow sessions, along with her own composition "White Rabbit". Subsequently, the Airplane's more ferocious rock-and-roll version became the band's first and biggest success, reaching No. 5 on the Billboard Hot 100. The group's first hit song, "Somebody to Love" was also one of the first big hits from the San Francisco Bay area and West Coast counterculture scene, to which numerous artists and musicians would be drawn in following years.

Slick's original performance of the song with the Great Society is more subdued, with the Jefferson Airplane version sounding far more accusatory and menacing on lines such as "your mind is so full of bread" and "your friends, baby, they treat you like a guest." The lyrics are in the second person, with each two-line verse setting a scene of alienation and despair, and the chorus repeating the title of the song, with slight variations such as: "... / Don't you need somebody to love? / Wouldn't you love somebody to love? / ..." Like the album on which it appeared, this song was instrumental in publicizing the existence of the Haight-Ashbury counterculture to the rest of the United States.

=== Reception ===
Billboard described the song as a "wild dance number loaded with vocal excitement," calling it a "hard driver, featuring powerful female vocal in the lead [which] never stops from start to finish." Cash Box called the single a "bright, pulsating, rhythmic, sometimes-frenetic, funky rock outing." Brett Milano of udiscovermusic.com rated Jorma Kaukonen's psychedelic guitar solo at the end of the song as one of the 100 all-time greatest, stating that it opens "with those three sustained wailing notes and [closes] with those sign-off chords that leave the song forever unresolved." Ultimate Classic Rock critic Michael Gallucci rated it Jefferson Airplane's best song because "it drives harder than almost anything else they ever recorded," "Slick checks in with her all-time greatest vocal" and "the hook is bigger and brighter than most of the band's psychedelic folk-outs."

=== Charts ===
==== Weekly charts ====
Chart (1967)	Peak position
Canada Top Singles (RPM)	1
U.S. Billboard Hot 100	5
U.S. Cash Box Top 100	5

Chart (1970)	Peak position
Netherlands (Dutch Top 40)	3

==== Year-end charts ====
Chart (1967)	Position
Canada Top Singles (RPM)	38
U.S. Billboard Hot 100	33
U.S. Cash Box	22

=== Certifications ===
Region	Certification	Certified units/sales
Italy (FIMI)	Gold	50,000^{‡}
New Zealand (RMNZ)	Gold	15,000^{‡}
United Kingdom (BPI)	Gold	400,000^{‡}
United States (RIAA)	Gold	500,000^{‡}
^{‡} Sales+streaming figures based on certification alone.

== Boogie Pimps version ==
"Somebody to Love"
- Saltshaker Remix cover

Single by Boogie Pimps
- Released: April 7, 2003
- Studio: Phuture Wax Soundlab (Germany)
- Length: 2:59
- Label: Superstar; Data; Ministry of Sound; Ultra
- Songwriter: Darby Slick
- Producers: Mark J Klak; Mirko Jacob

Boogie Pimps singles chronology
"Somebody to Love" (2003)	"Sunny" (2004)

Music video
- "Somebody to Love" on YouTube

German electronic music duo Boogie Pimps remixed "Somebody to Love" and released it as their debut single in April 2003. It peaked at No. 13 in Germany in mid-2003 and became a worldwide hit the following year, reaching No. 3 on the UK Singles Chart and No. 7 on the Irish Singles Chart. The song also entered the top 20 in Australia, Denmark, Finland, and the Netherlands. In most of these territories, this was their only hit single, as the follow-up single "Sunny" failed to chart.

=== Background and release ===
In December 2001, Mark J. Klak and Mirko Jacob of Boogie Pimps decided to cover the song after watching the 1998 film Fear and Loathing in Las Vegas, in which "Somebody to Love" is featured. The band's result initially failed to attract attention from German record labels, but the song soon became popular via underground white label releases. It was then picked up by German label Superstar Recordings and released as an official single on April 7, 2003. In the United Kingdom, it was released on January 5, 2004, while in Australia, it was issued as a CD single on January 26, 2004.

=== Music videos ===
Two music videos were made for "Somebody to Love". One features several infants sky diving out of an aeroplane towards a giant woman (Natasha Mealey) lying on a grassy hill country landscape in her underwear, singing the song.

The second video features a pool party.

=== Track listings ===
German maxi-CD single

1. "Somebody to Love" (radio edit) – 3:30
2. "Somebody to Love" (radio mix (clear)) – 3:46
3. "Somebody to Love" (main club mix) – 5:10
4. "Somebody to Love" (Moonbootica mix) – 6:54
5. "Somebody to Love" (ClubReise (Mirko Jacob mix)) – 5:24
6. "Somebody to Love" (CaterpillarClassich (Mark J Klak mix)) – 7:10

UK CD single

1. "Somebody to Love" (radio edit)
2. "Somebody to Love" (DJ Flex executive edit)
3. "Somebody to Love" (Pimps club mix)
4. "Somebody to Love" (DJ Flex executive remix)
5. "Somebody to Love" (Ian Knowles remix)
6. "Somebody to Love" (CD-ROM video)

Australian CD single

1. "Somebody to Love" (radio edit) – 2:59
2. "Somebody to Love" (club mix) – 6:02
3. "Somebody to Love" (DJ Flex & Sandy Wilhelm executive remix) – 7:38
4. "Somebody to Love" (Santos Somebody to Rock remix) – 6:47
5. "Somebody to Love" (Santos Another Planet remix) – 7:48
6. "Somebody to Love" (Raymond Barry remix) – 5:33

=== Charts ===
==== Weekly charts ====
Chart (2003–2004)	Peak position
Australia (ARIA)	10
Australian Club Chart (ARIA)	8
Australian Dance (ARIA)	1
Belgium (Ultratop 50 Flanders)	24
Denmark (Tracklisten)	13
Europe (Eurochart Hot 100)	9
Finland (Suomen virallinen lista)	17
Germany (GfK)	13
Hungary (Dance Top 40)	37
Ireland (IRMA)	7
Ireland Dance (IRMA)	1
Netherlands (Dutch Top 40)	11
Netherlands (Single Top 100)	19
Romania (Romanian Top 100)	63
Scottish Singles Sales (Official Charts)	3
Switzerland (Schweizer Hitparade)	70
UK Singles (Official Charts)	3
UK Dance (Official Charts)	3

==== Year-end charts ====
Chart (2003)	Position
Australian Club Chart (ARIA)	31
Germany (Media Control GfK)	54

Chart (2004)	Position
Australia (ARIA)	53
Australian Dance (ARIA)	3
Netherlands (Dutch Top 40)	88
UK Singles (OCC)	31

=== Certifications ===
Region	Certification	Certified units/sales
Australia (ARIA)	Gold	35,000^{^}
United Kingdom (BPI)	Silver	200,000^{‡}
^{^} Shipments figures based on certification alone.^{‡} Sales+streaming figures based on certification alone.

=== Release history ===
Region	Date	Format(s)	Label(s)	Ref.
Germany	April 7, 2003	Maxi-CD	Superstar	
United Kingdom	January 5, 2004	12-inch vinyl; CD	Data	
Australia	January 26, 2004	CD	Superstar; Data; Ministry of Sound	

== Usage in media ==
Jefferson Aiplane's studio release was used at the beginning of the Coen brothers' A Serious Man, just after the opening short story about the dybbuk and the title graphic. The Coens invited their longtime musical scorer, Carter Burwell, to compose a musical bridge for the title graphic to help transition from a pre-WWII Ashkenazi shtetl to St. Louis Park, Minnesota in 1967, where Danny Gopnik is listening to the song on an earpiece during his Hebrew language class at school. Burwell responded by adding a dark, brooding introduction to "Somebody to Love" using the same model electric guitar and bass used in the original studio recording, and played through similar amps by selected musicians. Referring to the sound fidelity, Burwell commented, "it was difficult to reduce our overall sound quality to that of the original recording. We did our best."
