= The Jaynetts =

American girl group

The Jaynetts were an American girl group based in the Bronx, New York, who became a one-hit wonder in 1963 with the song "Sally Go 'Round the Roses", which reached No. 2 on the US Billboard Hot 100.

== Career ==
=== Beginnings ===
In 1954, Bronx-native Zelma "Zell" Sanders produced "Lonely Nights" by a female R&B vocal group called The Hearts (not to be confused with "Long Lonely Nights" by Lee Andrews & the Hearts). With no major labels interested in a track by a female R&B group, "Lonely Nights" was eventually released on the small independent label Baton and became one of the earliest girl-group hits when it made the US R&B Top 10 hit single in 1955. This success allowed Sanders to found her own doo-wop-oriented label, J&S.

The Jaynetts name was conceived by adding the "J" in "J&S" to "Anetta", the middle name of Lezli Valentine, a session vocalist who sang on the group's 1957 debut, "I Wanted To Be Free", as well as on other J&S releases. The lead vocal on "I Wanted to Be Free" was by Justine "Baby" Washington, who regularly performed on the Hearts' releases in 1956–57; Washington also began recording solo in 1957 with the B-side of her second release, "Hard Way to Go" (1958), being a track credited to the Jaynetts entitled "Be My Boyfriend."

=== "Sally Go 'Round the Roses" ===
J&S Records had its first national success in 1961 when Abner Spector, an A&R man for the Chicago-based Chess Records, utilized J&S's Tuff subsidiary for the release of The Corsairs' hit "Smoky Places" which reached #12 in March 1962. In 1963 Spector had Zell Sanders assemble the line-up to cut a girl group record, and Spector's wife Lona Stevens wrote "Sally Go 'Round the Roses" with Sanders for this purpose.

The credited members of the Jaynetts who recorded "Sally Go 'Round the Roses" were Yvonne Bushnell, Ethel Davis (aka Vernell Hill), Ada Ray Kelly and Johnnie Louise Richardson, who had all previously recorded for J&S; a fifth credited member Mary Sue Wells (aka Mary Sue Wellington/Mary Green Wilson) was recruited through a newspaper advertisement. It was announced that Johnnie Louise Richardson, Sanders' daughter, who had been a member of Johnnie & Joe, was not intended as a group member beyond singing on their first track.

Vocalists who sang on "Sally Go 'Round the Roses" besides the five credited personnel include J&S veterans Selena Healey, Marie Hood, Marlene Mack (aka Marlina Mack/Marlina Mars), Louise (Harris) Murray (a member of the original Hearts), Lezli Valentine and Iggy Williams. According to Richardson, "Anybody that came in the studio that week, [Spector] would put them on [the track]. Originally, I think he had about 20 voices on 'Sally.'" The sessions produced only the one song, "Sally Go 'Round the Roses" being released with the song's instrumental track as its B-side, credited to 'Sing Along Without the Jaynetts'. The single reached No. 2 on the Billboard Hot 100 chart dated 28 September 1963, and No. 6 in Canada.

=== Sally Go 'Round the Roses album ===
The single's success led to the release of a Sally Go 'Round the Roses album on Tuff; besides the title cut, in both the vocal and instrumental versions, and the follow-up single "Keep an Eye on Her" "bubbled under the Hot 100" in November 1963. The album featured "Archie's Melody", "Bongo Bobby", "I Wanna Know", "No Love At All", "One Track Mind", "Pick Up My Marbles", "School Days" and "See Saw"; also featured as "A Special Guest Appearance" was "Dear Abby" credited to the Hearts, a minor hit (#94) recorded by at least some of the same personnel as "Sally Go 'Round the Roses", and with the same "Sing Along without the..." instrumental-only version on the B-side. Despite the Jaynetts having been promoted as a quintet, their album cover image was of a trio, only two of whom—Ethel Davis and Lezli Valentine—are identifiable. Lezli is the lead voice on "Sally" and she performed the spoken part on "Dear Abby".

=== JFK assassination ===
In 1963, American Bandstand signed the Jaynetts to Dick Clark's Caravan of Stars national U.S. tour, which was scheduled to perform its 15th show on the night of November 22, 1963 at the Memorial Auditorium in Dallas, Texas, until suddenly the Friday evening event had to be cancelled, moments after U.S. President John F. Kennedy was assassinated that afternoon while touring Dallas in an open car caravan.

=== Follow-up ===
The Jaynetts name was used for the release of two further singles on Tuff: "Snowman, Snowman Sweet Potato Nose" and "There's No Love at All" b/w "Tonight You Belong to Me". Throughout 1964 Tuff also released recordings featuring at least some of the personnel from "Sally Go 'Round the Roses"; these releases were credited to the Clickettes (who were Lezli Valentine, Marlina Mars and Iggy Williams), the Poppies (not to be confused with the Poppies who recorded for Epic in 1966) and the Patty Cakes (whose release "I Understand Them" was subtitled "A Love Song to the Beatles"). In 1964, the Roulette single "Changing My Life for You" b/w "I Would If I Could", credited to the Z-Debs, was sung by members of the Jaynetts who had recorded "Sally Go 'Round the Roses".

The 1964 J&S single, "Cry Behind the Daisies", was the first release credited to the Jaynetts with a new core line-up, retaining Johnnie Louise Richardson and adding Evangeline Jenkins, Linda Jenkins and Georgette Malone. This group had further J&S releases into 1965 with "Chicken, Chicken, Crane or Crow" b/w "Winky Dinky", "Peepin' In and Out the Window" b/w "Extra Extra, Read All About It", "Who Stole the Cookie" b/w "That's My Baby", "Looking for Wonderland, My Lover" b/w "Make It an Extra" and "Vangie Don't You Cry" b/w "My Guy Is As Sweet As Can Be". The group ceased their recording activities in 1965.

=== Solo recordings ===
Tuff Records released singles in 1964 credited to Vernell Hill (Ethel Davis) and Mary Sue Wellington (Mary Sue Wells: her name was adjusted to prevent confusion with Mary Wells). J&S also released solo tracks by Ada Ray Kelly – billed as Ada "Cry Baby" Ray on the Zell's label in 1963 and 1964. Vernell Hill's Tuff single, "Long Haired Daddy", with songwriting credit by Abner Spector, was also released on Roulette in 1964.

In 1968, Lezli Valentine recorded for All Platinum, a label formed the previous year in Englewood, New Jersey, by Sylvia Robinson, and recorded the original versions of The Moments' hits "Love on a Two Way Street", "I'm So Lost", "I Gotta Keep on Loving You" and "I Won't Do Anything". She also sang background on Eddie Kendricks' version of "Not on the Outside". In a 2000 interview for John Clemente's book Girl Groups: Fabulous Females That Rocked the World, Valentine revealed she had retired from the music industry, worked in Alcohol Beverage Control and had become a stenographer under then-New York Governor Nelson Rockefeller. Marie Hood went on to work for the Postal Service.

From 1963 through 1966, Marlene Mack, as Marlina Mars, had singles released on Capitol, Okeh and MGM Records. Around 1970 she briefly partnered Herb Fame in Peaches and Herb's live shows, although the original Peaches, Francine Barker, still sang the female part on the duo's records.

Louise Murray, who recorded solo for Verve in 1965, was reported to be performing in a duo with her husband Donald Gatling: they bill themselves as the Two Hearts, referencing the group with whom Murray had recorded "Lonely Nights" in 1954. At the Detroit Breakdown concert held 31 July 2010 at the Guggenheim Band Shell, Murray came onstage during the set by ? and the Mysterians to duet on "Sally Go 'Round the Roses".

=== Deaths ===
Johnnie Louise Richardson died on October 25, 1988. Lezli Valentine, later Lezli Green, died on March 9, 2021.

== Discography ==
=== Singles ===
Year	Title	Peak chart positions		Record Label	B-side	Album
Year	Title	US Pop	US R&B	Record Label	B-side	Album
1963	"Sally Go 'Round the Roses"	2	4	Tuff	"Instrumental Background to Sally Go 'Round the Roses"	Sally Go 'Round the Roses
1963	"Keep an Eye on Her"	120	—	Tuff	"Instrumental Background to Keep an Eye on Her"	Sally Go 'Round the Roses
1963	"Snowman, Snowman, Sweet Potato Nose"	—	—	Tuff	"Instrumental Background to Snowman, Snowman, Sweet Potato Nose"	
1964	"No Love at All"	—	—	Tuff	"Tonight You Belong to Me"	Sally Go 'Round the Roses
1964	"Johnny, Don't Cry"	—	—	Tuff	"No Love at All"	
1965	"Who Stole the Cookie"	—	—	J & S	"That's My Boy"	

== See also ==
- One-hit wonders in the United States

== Bibliography ==
- Clemente, John (2000). Girl Groups - Fabulous Females That Rocked the World. Iola, Wisc. Krause Publications. p. 276. ISBN 0-87341-816-6
- Clemente, John (2013). Girl Groups - Fabulous Females Who Rocked the World. Bloomington, IN Authorhouse Publications. p. 623. ISBN 978-1-4772-7633-4
