= My Best Friend (Jefferson Airplane song) =

Single by Jefferson Airplane

from the album Surrealistic Pillow
- Released: January 1967
- Recorded: November 4, 1966
- Genre: Pop; folk-pop; country
- Length: 3:01
- Label: RCA Victor
- Songwriter(s): Skip Spence
- Producer(s): Rick Jarrard

"My Best Friend" is a song by the Jefferson Airplane. It was written by the band's former drummer Skip Spence. The song appeared on the band's second album, Surrealistic Pillow and was released as a single. The single stalled at number 103 on the Billboard Bubbling Under chart, which Jefferson Airplane biographer Jeff Tamarakin attributes to it being a "slower-paced song" that was not what the public expected from a San Francisco acid rock group.

By the time the album was recorded, Spence had left Jefferson Airplane to join Moby Grape. Tamarakin described the song as "Set to a lazy hop-along rhythm, the mostly acoustic ballad is the embodiment of the love-power ethic, sung in uplifting tandem harmonies. Joe Viglione of Allmusic praised the song as "a beautiful blend of original Jefferson Starship sound with a harmony-ragged Mamas & The Papas meets Spanky & Our Gang's loose folk vaudeville." George Starostin praised it as a slow "catchy pop song." Rolling Stone called it a "country charmer." Doug Collette of Glide Magazine compared the song to tracks on the debut album Jefferson Airplane Takes Off and noted it as "polite, sweet harmony-laden."

== Chart history ==
Chart (1967)	Peak position
US Billboard Hot 100	103

== Personnel ==
- Marty Balin - vocals
- Grace Slick - vocals
- Jorma Kaukonen - lead guitar
- Paul Kantner - rhythm guitar, vocals
- Jack Casady - bass guitar
- Spencer Dryden - drums
