= David Miner (musician) =

American singer (born 1945)

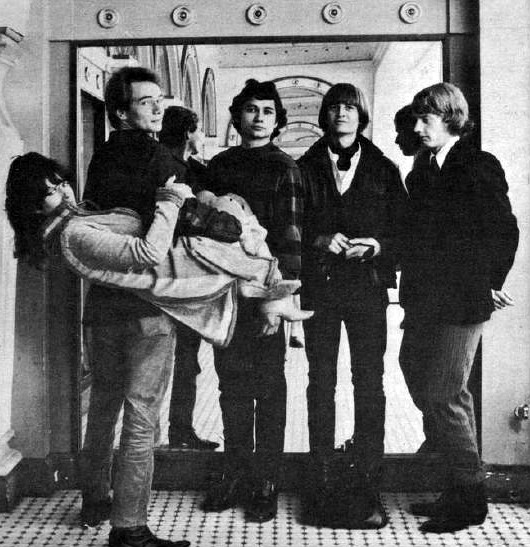
- David Miner (middle) as part of The Great Society band in 1965

Background information
- Born: July 24, 1945 (age 81); Fort Worth, Texas, U.S.
- Genres: Psychedelic rock, garage rock
- Occupation: Musician
- Instruments: Vocals, guitar
- Formerly of: The Great Society

David Miner (born July 24, 1945), sometimes credited as David Minor, is an American singer, guitarist and songwriter, perhaps best known as a member of The Great Society in the 1960s. He co-founded The Great Society along with Jerry, Darby, and Grace Slick as well as Bard Du Pont, in the sense that he was there from the start. Miner sang most of the lead vocals in the early days of the band and wrote a number of songs, including "That's How It Is", "You Can't Cry", and "Daydream Nightmare Love".

Miner left the Great Society in 1966 and moved to El Paso, Texas, attending the University of Texas at El Paso as a full-time student. At El Paso, he married his second wife, Anna, also a student, and they had two children together. They both received BAs in English in 1970, and did graduate work at Binghamton University of the State University of New York. Miner received a PhD in Comparative Literature from Binghamton University, helped along by winning a Woodrow Wilson Fellowship and a National Defense Education Act Fellowship. After teaching in the City University of New York for eight years, he went into business and led a quiet life.

Though he never resumed his former career as a full-time rock performer, he did play with local bands in New York City, such as The Axles, Avatar, and The New Race—all during the 1980s.

Currently he is making music as Helion Magister. He released his first new album, titled Vaquero, on his own label Minertavr Records in 2004, and he is working on another album titled Songs I Wrote in the 60's But Never Played the Way I Felt Until Now.

He still lives in Queens, New York City. He has six children from four different marriages, and has been married to Patricia for almost two decades.
