= She Has Funny Cars =

1967 song by the Jefferson Airplane

Song by Jefferson Airplane

from the album Surrealistic Pillow
- Released: 1967
- Recorded: October 31, 1966
- Genre: Psychedelic rock
- Length: 3:07
- Label: RCA Victor
- Composer: Jorma Kaukonen
- Lyricist: Marty Balin
- Producer: Rick Jarrard

"She Has Funny Cars" is a song by the American rock group Jefferson Airplane. Vocalist Marty Balin wrote the lyrics, while guitarist Jorma Kaukonen supplied the music. The song appeared as the opening track on their breakthrough album, Surrealistic Pillow (1967).

== Overview ==
The lyrics reflect on materialism in American society. In a song review for AllMusic, Matthew Greenwald commented:

Musically, "She Has Funny Cars" is driven by a hypnotic, Bo Diddley-style beat and a powerful guitar riff that sounds like [the Beatles] "Day Tripper" turned inside out. Lyrically, it's a strong bit of social commentary about independence and the shallowness of hypocrisy.

== Personnel ==
The song features Jack Casady on fuzz bass. Balin sings the first part with Grace Slick's contrasting second part.

- Marty Balin – lead vocals, percussion
- Grace Slick – vocals
- Jorma Kaukonen – lead guitar
- Paul Kantner – rhythm guitar, vocals
- Jack Casady – bass guitar, fuzz bass
- Spencer Dryden – drums
