= Today (Jefferson Airplane song) =

Song by Jefferson Airplane

from the album Surrealistic Pillow
- Released: 1967
- Recorded: November 2, 1966
- Genre: Folk rock; psychedelic folk; progressive folk
- Length: 3:02
- Label: RCA Victor
- Songwriters: Marty Balin, Paul Kantner
- Producer: Rick Jarrard

"Today" is a folk rock ballad written by Marty Balin and Paul Kantner from the band Jefferson Airplane. It first appeared on their album Surrealistic Pillow with a live version later appearing on the expanded rerelease of Bless Its Pointed Little Head. It was also recorded by jazz saxophonist Tom Scott for his 1967 album The Honeysuckle Breeze; this version was sampled in the song "They Reminisce Over You" by Pete Rock & C.L. Smooth. Marty Balin said, "I wrote it to try to meet Tony Bennett. He was recording in the next studio. I admired him, so I thought I'd write him a song. I never got to meet him, but the Airplane ended up doing it." Jerry Garcia plays the simple, repetitive but poignant lead guitar riff on the song.

== Personnel ==
- Marty Balin – lead vocals, tambourine
- Grace Slick – vocals
- Jorma Kaukonen – guitar
- Paul Kantner – guitar, vocals
- Jack Casady – bass
- Spencer Dryden – drums
- Jerry Garcia – lead guitar
