= Darby Slick =

American guitarist and songwriter

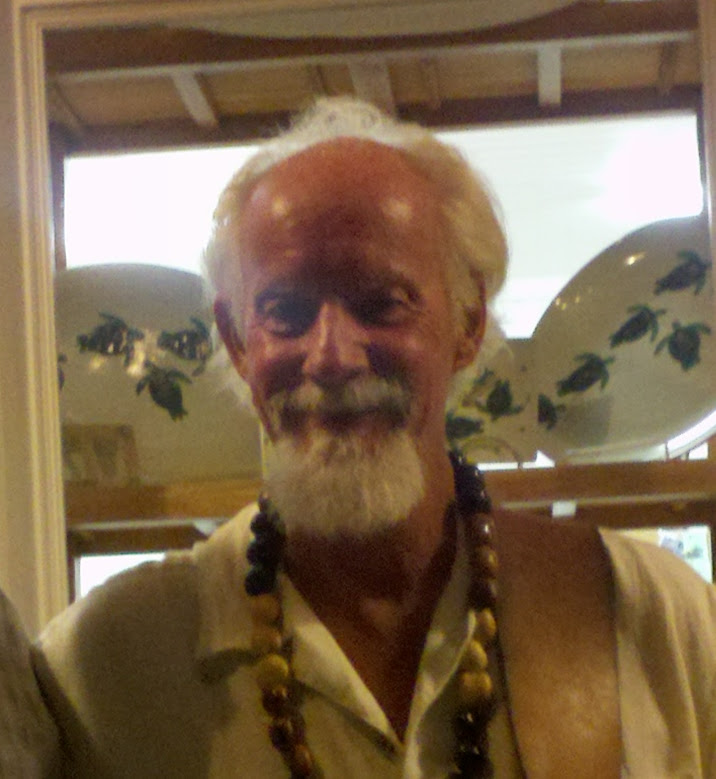
- Slick in 2011

Background information
- Born: Dabney Roger Slick; February 26, 1944 (age 82); Dallas, Texas, U.S.
- Instrument: Guitar
- Years active: 1965–present
- Formerly of: The Great Society

Dabney Roger "Darby" Slick (born February 26, 1944) is an American guitarist and songwriter, best known as a former member of the Great Society and the writer of the Jefferson Airplane song "Somebody to Love".

== Early life ==
Slick was born in Dallas, Texas, and raised in Hawaii before his family settled in Palo Alto, California.

== The Great Society ==
In 1965, Slick co-founded the Great Society with his brother Jerry Slick, sister-in-law Grace Slick, and Jenn Piersol (David Miner and Bard DuPont joined shortly afterward). Darby played lead guitar and occasionally sang backup vocals. Slick wrote "Someone to Love"—originally titled "Mind Full of Bread"—in the process of writing a novel, which he started in 1962. Slick's literary aspirations tapered off as he concentrated more on guitar, and he finished the song in 1965 after a breakup. He intended the song to address giving love instead of the cliché of wanting it.

"Someone to Love" was issued as a Great Society single by North Beach Records with "Free Advice" as its B-side. The single saw limited distribution and made little impact at the time. The Great Society dissolved when Grace Slick joined Jefferson Airplane, who recorded the song—retitled "Somebody to Love"—and scored a top 10 hit on the national charts in 1967.

Slick composed other Great Society songs such as "Darkly Smiling," and "Free Advice," which displayed his budding interest in Indian music.

== Later work ==
After Slick's time in the Great Society, he took an interest in Indian music. He took several trips to India to learn more about the genre. He published an autobiography in 1991 titled Don't You Want Somebody to Love: Reflections on the San Francisco Sound detailing his time with the band and lessons while on trips to India.

== Discography ==
=== The Great Society ===
- Grace Slick and the Great Society: Conspicuous Only in Its Absence (Columbia, 1968)
- Grace Slick and the Great Society, Vol. 2: Collector's Item (How It Was) (Columbia, 1968)

=== Solo ===
- Sandoland (Taxim, 1995)
- King of the Fretless Guitar (Taxim, 1998)
- Following Yonder Stars (Self-released, 2019)
