= The Reflection (album) =

Studio album by Keb' Mo'
- Released: August 2, 2011
- Studios: At House of Blues Studios, Encino, Nashville, TN, at Twelve Tone Studios, at Eastwest Studios
- Genre: Blues
- Length: 52:30
- Label: Rykodisc/Yolabelle International
- Producer: Keb' Mo'

Keb' Mo' chronology
Live and Mo' (2009)	The Reflection (2011)	BLUESAmericana (2014)

Professional ratings
Review scores
Source	Rating
Pop Matters	6/10 stars
AllMusic	3/5 stars

The Reflection is the eleventh studio album by Keb' Mo'. It was released on August 2, 2011, through Yolabelle International and distributed through Rykodisc. It was his first full-length studio album since the release of Suitcase in 2006 and featured guest performances by Vince Gill, Dave Koz and India Arie. After the termination of his contract with Sony, Moore 'took the time to get my family started and study the record business as it is now and where it’s going'. This album differs stylistically from his past record, and was describes as having an 'adult-contemporary' vibe. It includes renditions of "One of These Nights" by The Eagles and "Crush on You" by Kevin So.

The album was recorded over a three-year period that saw Moore move from Los Angeles to Nashville, and suffering the loss of a number of instruments during the 2010 floods. Besides two covers, he co-wrote with Gill, Melissa Manchester, Alan Rich, and Maia Sharp. The song "Inside Outside" was written together with Skip Ewing. The song "We Don't Need It" had originally been recorded for the Keep it Simple album, while the traditional "Something Within" included contributions from Moore's extended family.

The album was moderately successful and reached #81 in the Billboard 200 Album chart.

== Track listing ==
1. "The Whole Enchilada" (Kevin Moore/John Lewis Parker) - 4:26
2. "Inside Outside" (Skip Ewing/Moore) - 3:37
3. "All The Way" (Moore/Maria Sharp) - 3:50
4. "The Reflection (I See Myself in You) (Moore/Phil Ramocon) - 6:47
5. "Crush on You" (Kevin So) - 3:34
6. "One of These Nights" (Glenn Frey/Don Henley) - 3:49
7. "My Baby's Tellin' Lies" (Vince Gill/Moore) - 3:41
8. "My Shadow" (Moore/Leon Ware) - 4:51
9. "We Don't Need It" (Moore/Allan D. Rich) - 4:38
10. "Just Lookin'" (Moore/Rich) - 3:56
11. "Walk Through Fire" (Melissa Manchester/Moore) - 4:14
12. "Something Within" (Lucie E. Campbell/Moore) - 5:12

== Personnel ==
- Keb' Mo' - Dobro (tr. 9), Drum Programming (tr.2, 5, 8, 10, 11), Drums, el.guitar (tr.1,3-5), Keyboards (tr.10), Percussion (tr7), Percussion Programming (tr. 11), Piano (Electric) (tr.2, 11), Producer, Slide Guitar (tr.1, 2, 3, 4), Vocals. Acoustic g (tr. 9)
- Vail Johnson - Bass (tr. 2, 5, 9, 11)
- Mindi Abair - Soprano Saxophone (tr.8)
- Manny Alvarez - Lap Steel Guitar (tr.9)
- Bruce Bouton - Lap Steel Guitar (tr.2)
- Robbie Brooks-Moore - Background Vocals
- Alex Brown - Vocal Arrangements, Background Vocals
- Gordon Campbell - Cymbals (tr. 12), Drums (tr. 1, Tom tom (tr. 12)
- Tracy Carter - El. piano (tr.1, 12), Hammond Organ (tr.1,3), Synthesizer (tr.12)
- Paulie Cerra - Tenor Saxophone (tr.3, 10)
- Lauvella Cole - Background Vocals
- Paulinho Da Costa - Percussion
- Dave Delhomme - Electric Piano (tr.4, 10)
- Heather Lauren Donovan - Background Vocals
- Erik- Walls - Electric Guitar (tr.1, 12)
- Vince Gill - Composer, Featured Artist, Mandolin, Vocals (tr.7)
- Andrew Gouche - Bass (tr. 12)
- Bobbette Hairston - Background Vocals
- Tony Harrell - Hammond Organ (tr.5)
- India.Arie - Featured Artist, Vocals
- Phillip Ingram - Background Vocals
- Dave Koz - Alto Saxophone (tr.6)
- Lisa Linson - Background Vocals
- Paul Litterall - Trumpet (tr.3, 10)
- Greg Manning - Electric Piano (tr.3, 7), Synthesizer (tr.7)
- Reggie McBride - Bass(Lead) (tr.2), bass (tr.7)
- Kevin McCormick - Bass (tr.3, 6
- Marcus Miller - Bass, Featured Artist (tr. 8, 10)
- Kevin Moore II - Drums, Rhythm Arrangements (tr. 12)
- Jeff Paris - Piano (tr.6), Synthesizer (tr.2, 6)
- Greg Phillinganes - Hammond Organ (tr.4)
- Rochelle Rawls - Vocal Ad-Libs
- John Robinson - Drums (tr.3, 4, 6, 7, 9)
- Vida Simon - Vocals
- David T. Walker - Electric Guitar (tr. 1, 3, 4 Featured Artist
- Freddie Washington - Bass (tr.4)
- Jason White - Hammond Organ (tr.8, 11)
- Victor L. Wooten - Bass (tr.1)
- Mark Wyatt - Vocals
- Roosevelt Victor Wyatt - Vocals
- Jeff Young - Hammond Organ (tr.2, 7, 10), Piano Spinet (tr.3), piano (tr.4, 9), el, piano (tr.8
- Written-By, Electric Piano, Piano, Backing Vocals – Kevin So (tr.5)
