= TajMo =

Studio album by Taj Mahal and Keb' Mo'
- Released: May 5, 2017
- Studio: Stu Stu Studio (Nashville, TN); Blue 52 Studio (Sherman Oaks, CA); Rax Trax Recording (Chicago, IL); Tempo Music Recording Studio (Miami, FL)
- Genre: Blues
- Length: 45:20
- Label: Concord
- Producer: Keb' Mo'; Taj Mahal

Taj Mahal and Keb' Mo' chronology
TajMo (2017)	Room on the Porch (2025)

Taj Mahal chronology
Labor of Love (2016)	TajMo (2017)	Get on Board (2022)

Keb' Mo' chronology
BLUESAmericana (2014)	TajMo (2017)	Oklahoma (2019)

TajMo is the first collaborative studio album by American blues musicians Taj Mahal and Keb' Mo'. It was released on May 5, 2017, via Concord Records. Recording sessions took place at Stu Stu Studio in Nashville, Blue 52 Studio in Sherman Oaks, Rax Trax Recording in Chicago and Tempo Music Recording Studio in Miami.

In the United States, the album peaked at number 80 on the Billboard 200, number 18 on the Top Rock Albums, number 6 on the Americana/Folk Albums and atop the Blues Albums charts. At the 60th Annual Grammy Awards, it won a Grammy Award for Best Contemporary Blues Album.

The pair sat in with Jon Batiste and Stay Human on The Late Show with Stephen Colbert on April 18, 2017, to promote the album. The performance featured the song "All Around The World".

In an interview with WBGO, Keb' Mo' said he was working on a second album with Taj Mahal, expected to be released in 2025.

== Critical reception ==
Professional ratings
Aggregate scores
Source	Rating
Metacritic	63/100
Review scores
Source	Rating
All About Jazz	4/5 stars
AllMusic	3/5 stars
American Songwriter	3.5/5 stars
Record Collector	3/5 stars
The Arts Desk	2/5 stars

TajMo was met with generally favorable reviews from music critics. At Metacritic, which assigns a normalized rating out of 100 to reviews from mainstream publications, the album received an average score of 63, based on four reviews.

Hal Horowitz of American Songwriter praised the album, writing: "the twosome generates real sparks throughout and the natural camaraderie bursts through the speakers. You can almost see, and surely feel, their beaming faces on many selections. But even at its best, it's hard not to wish this was a bigger showcase for Mahal than Mo', with the latter's notoriously slicker approach dialed down to allow the former's gutsy soul to take the spotlight". AllMusic's Stephen Thomas Erlewine stated: "maybe it's not a major record but its mellowness is charming, and the two bluesmen play off each other like the longtime friends they are, which is an endearing thing to hear". Charles Waring of Record Collector wrote: "the affirmative, feel-good tone is set with the mid-tempo opener, "Don't Leave Me Here", the first of two tunes the blues men co-wrote together".

== Track listing ==
No.	Title	Writer(s)	Length
1.	"Don't Leave Me Here"	Kevin Roosevelt Moore; Henry St. Claire Fredericks; Gary Nicholson	5:01
2.	"She Knows How to Rock Me"	William Lee Perryman	2:40
3.	"All Around the World"	Moore; Chic Streetman	3:22
4.	"Om Sweet Om" (featuring Lizz Wright)	Moore; John Lewis Parker; Om Johari	3:35
5.	"Shake Me in Your Arms"	William Lee Nichols	5:58
6.	"That's Who I Am"	Moore; Al Anderson; Leslie Satcher	4:17
7.	"Diving Duck Blues"	John Adam Estes	4:28
8.	"Squeeze Box"	Pete Townshend	3:16
9.	"Ain't Nobody Talkin'"	Moore; Parker	4:00
10.	"Soul"	Moore; Fredericks	6:01
11.	"Waiting on the World to Change"	John Mayer	2:42
Total length:			45:20

== Personnel ==
- Kevin "Keb' Mo'" Moore – vocals (tracks: 1–7, 9–11), backing vocals (track 8), electric guitar (tracks: 1, 3, 5, 6, 8–10), keyboards (track 1), percussion (tracks: 1, 11), horn arrangement (tracks: 1, 3, 6), resonator guitar (tracks: 2, 6, 7), bass (tracks: 4, 11), acoustic guitar (tracks: 4, 9–11), organ (track 4), slide guitar (track 6), Wurlitzer electric piano (track 6), nylon string guitar (track 10), producer
- Henry "Taj Mahal" Fredericks – vocals, acoustic guitar (tracks: 2, 7, 11), resonator guitar (track 6), banjo & ukulele (track 10), producer
- Elizabeth LaCharla "Lizz" Wright – vocals (track 4)
- Michael Hicks – backing vocals & vocal arrangement (tracks: 3, 4, 6, 10), keyboards (tracks: 1, 6), B3 electric organ (tracks: 3, 6, 8, 10), piano (track 3), Wurlitzer electric piano (track 8), Rhodes electric piano (track 10)
- Raphael Nduka Onwuzuruigbo – backing vocals (tracks: 3, 4, 6, 10)
- Sidney Rudder – backing vocals (tracks: 3, 4, 6, 10)
- Dain Ussery – backing vocals (tracks: 3, 4, 6, 10)
- Sharon Cho – backing vocals (tracks: 3, 4, 6, 10)
- Robbie Brooks-Moore – backing vocals (tracks: 3, 8)
- Stephanie Bentley – backing vocals (track 3)
- Meg Manning – backing vocals (track 3)
- Bonnie Raitt – backing vocals (track 11)
- Thaddeus Witherspoon – drums (tracks: 1, 10)
- Billy Branch – harmonica (track 1)
- Sam Levine – tenor saxophone (track 1), saxophone & flute (track 3)
- Roger Bissell – trombone (tracks: 1, 3)
- Keith Everette Smith – trumpet (tracks: 1, 3)
- Lendell Black – horn arrangement (tracks: 1, 3, 6, 10)
- Eric Ramey – bass (tracks: 2, 5, 9), electric piano overdub (track 9)
- Marcus Finnie – drums (tracks: 2, 5)
- Phillip Hughley – electric guitar (tracks: 3, 4, 10)
- Tommy Sims – bass (tracks: 3, 6, 8)
- Chester Thompson – drums (tracks: 3, 4)
- Crystal Taliefero – percussion (tracks: 3, 4, 10), congas, rainstick, shaker & udu (track 10)
- Sheila Escovedo – percussion (tracks: 3, 8, 10), congas & cowbell (tracks: 8, 10), guiro, springdrum, tambourine & vibraslap (track 8), cymbal, shaker, shekere & timbales (track 10)
- Colin Linden – mandolin (tracks: 3, 6, 8), guitar (track 8)
- Quentin Ware – trumpet (tracks: 3, 5, 6, 9, 10)
- Joe Walsh – electric guitar (tracks: 4, 5, 8)
- Phil Madeira – keyboards (tracks: 4, 9), organ (track 4), B3 electric organ (tracks: 5, 9), rhythm accordion (track 8)
- Lee Oskar – harmonica (track 4)
- Jovan Quallo – saxophone (tracks: 5, 6, 9, 10), tenor saxophone (tracks: 6, 9)
- Roland Barber – trombone (tracks: 5, 6, 9, 10)
- Keio Stroud – drums (tracks: 6, 8, 9)
- Jeff Taylor – lead accordion (track 8)
- Phillip Moore – bass (track 10)
- Néstor Torres – flute (track 10)
- Casey Wasner – recording, tracking (tracks: 3, 4, 6, 8, 9, 10)
- Zach Allen – recording, tracking (tracks: 2, 5)
- John Caldwell – recording
- Andy Shoemaker – recording (track 1)
- Mychael Davison – recording (tracks: 3, 8, 10)
- Jesse Nichols – engineering, recording (track 7), tracking (track 11)
- William Sigismondi Jr. – recording (track 10)
- Alex Jarvis – additional recording
- Ross Hogarth – mixing
- Richard Dodd – mastering
- Jay Blakesberg – photography
- Melissa Wood – design

== Charts ==
Chart (2017)	Peak position
Belgian Albums (Ultratop Wallonia)	154
Dutch Albums (Album Top 100)	104
Swiss Albums (Schweizer Hitparade)	17
UK Americana Albums (OCC)	10
UK Jazz & Blues Albums (OCC)	2
US Billboard 200	80
US Top Album Sales (Billboard)	30
US Top Rock Albums (Billboard)	18
US Americana/Folk Albums (Billboard)	6
US Top Current Album Sales (Billboard)	29
US Top Blues Albums (Billboard)	1
