= The Breakdown (album) =

Studio album by Keb' Mo'
- Released: August 21, 2026
- Studios: Stu Stu Studio (Franklin, Tennessee); Matai Studio (Los Angeles, California); Vertical Sound Studio (Nashville, Tennessee); Flame Studios (Johannesburg, South Africa)
- Genre: Blues
- Length: 38:37
- Label: Concord
- Producers: Keb' Mo'; Zach Allen (co.)

Keb' Mo' chronology
Room on the Porch (2025)	The Breakdown (2026)

Professional ratings
Review scores
Source	Rating
AllMusic	4/5 stars
Spectrum Culture	65%
Spill	4.5/5 stars

The Breakdown is the sixteenth solo studio album by American musician Keb' Mo'. It was released on August 21, 2026 via Concord Records. Recording sessions took place at Stu Stu Studio in Franklin, Matai Studio in Los Angeles, Vertical Sound Studio in Nashville and Flame Studios in Johannesburg. Self-produced with co-production provided by Zach Allen, it features guest appearances from Soweto Gospel Choir and Take 6.

The album has been nominated for a Grammy Award for Best Contemporary Blues Album with the winners set to be announced on February 7, 2027 at the 69th Annual Grammy Awards ceremony.

== Track listing ==
No.	Title	Writer(s)	Length
1.	"Fussing and Fighting"	Kevin Moore; Arthur Adams	4:14
2.	"Every Step of the Way"	Moore; Lauren Lucas	4:35
3.	"They Don't Make 'Em Like They Used To" (featuring Take 6)	Moore; Zach Allen	4:42
4.	"More Yesterdays"	Moore; Mark Beeson	3:42
5.	"We Make Love"	Moore; John Lewis Parker	3:33
6.	"Walking on Water"	Moore; Jill Colucci; Rita Coolidge	3:38
7.	"Hand It Over" (featuring Soweto Gospel Choir)	Moore	3:23
8.	"Living in the Moment"	Moore; Andrea Weltman	3:37
9.	"Stitched Up Heart"	Moore; Rebecca Correia	3:18
10.	"One Day Away"	Moore; Colin Linden	3:55
Total length:			38:37

== Personnel ==
- Kevin "Keb' Mo'" Moore – lead vocals, steel guitar (track 1), acoustic guitar (tracks: 2-10), producer
- Take 6 – backing vocals (track 3)
- Jeanette Mazibuko – alto vocals (track 7)
- Mary Mulovhedzi – alto vocals (track 7)
- Phello Jiyane – soprano vocals (track 7)
- Suprice Sidumo – soprano vocals (track 7)
- Vincent Jiyane – tenor vocals (track 7)
- Vusimuzi Shabalala – tenor vocals (track 7)
- Jabulile Mola – bass vocals (track 7)
- Thabang Mkhwanazi – bass vocals (track 7)
- Zach Allen – co-producer, recording, mixing
- Mark Kibble – recording (track 3)
- Nikanyiso Martin Ngwenya – recording (track 7)
- Rodney Millon – recording (track 8)
- Melissa Britton – engineering assistant (track 7), additional engineering assistant (tracks: 1, 4)
- Pat McMakin Sr. – engineering assistant (track 7)
- Ari Ruchman – additional engineering assistant (tracks: 2, 6, 9)
- Diniloxolo Ndlakuse – musical director (track 7)
- Alexander Seier – digital editing
- Richard Dodd – mastering
- Rachel Deeb – photography

== Charts ==
Chart (2026)	Peak position
Swiss Albums (Schweizer Hitparade)	31
UK Album Downloads (Official Charts)	65
UK Americana Albums (Official Charts)	20
UK Jazz & Blues Albums (Official Charts)	4
US Top Blues Albums (Billboard)	5
