= Put a Woman in Charge =

Single by Keb' Mo' featuring Rosanne Cash

from the album Oklahoma
- Released: September 28, 2018
- Studio: Stu Stu
- Genre: Country; blues; Americana; country pop; funk
- Label: Concord Music Group
- Songwriter(s): Keb' Mo'; John Lewis Parker; Beth Nielsen Chapman
- Producer(s): Keb' Mo'

Keb' Mo' singles chronology
"America the Beautiful" (2015)	"Put a Woman in Charge" (2018)	"Don't Throw it Away" (2018)

Rosanne Cash singles chronology
"The Sunken Lands" (2014)	"Put a Woman in Charge" (2018)	"By Degrees" (2018)

Music video
- "Put a Woman in Charge" on YouTube

"Put a Woman in Charge" is a song performed by blues musician Keb' Mo' and featuring country singer Rosanne Cash. The song was released on September 28, 2018 and is the lead single off his album Oklahoma. A music video for the song directed by Glenn Sweitzer and produced by Robbie Brooks Moore was released on October 11, 2018 on Keb' Mo's YouTube. The video is dedicated to his mom, who died at the age of 91, because she was a strong and powerful leader. The song charted at No. 10 on the Billboard Blues Songs Chart.

The song is currently nominated for "Song of the Year" at the 2020 International Folk Music Awards.

== Composition ==
Keb' Mo' says "Put A Woman in Charge’ is about trying something else. There have been a lot of great achievements made by men or by the masculine, but maybe, just maybe, we’ve gotten too comfortable with the imbalance of men in power and have fallen short by not listening and embracing what women have to offer when they lead." He also says that he hopes that this song gets women to speak up and be brave about what they do and believe in.

== Charts ==
Chart (2018)	Peak position
US Blues Songs (Billboard)	10
