= Good to Be... =

Studio album by Keb' Mo'
- Released: January 22, 2022
- Studio: Stu Stu Studio (Franklin, TN); Ocean Way Nashville Recording Studio (Nashville, TN); Royal Studios (Memphis, TN)
- Genre: Blues
- Length: 47:50
- Label: Rounder
- Producer: Keb' Mo'; Ketch Secor; Tom Hambridge; Vince Gill

Keb' Mo' chronology
Moonlight, Mistletoe & You (2019)	Good to Be... (2022)	Room on the Porch (2025)

Professional ratings
Aggregate scores
Source	Rating
Metacritic	67/100
Review scores
Source	Rating
AllMusic	3/5 stars
American Songwriter	4.5/5 stars
Classic Rock	3.5/5 stars
Mojo	3/5 stars
Uncut	6/10

Good to Be... is the fifteenth solo studio album by American musician Keb' Mo'. It was released on January 22, 2022, via Rounder Records. The recording sessions took place at Stu Stu Studio in Franklin, Ocean Way Nashville Recording Studio in Nashville and Royal Recording Studios in Memphis. Produced by Tom Hambridge, Vince Gill, Ketch Secor, and Keb' Mo', it features guest appearances from Darius Rucker, Kristin Chenoweth, and Old Crow Medicine Show.

The album was nominated for a Grammy Award for Best Americana Album at the 65th Annual Grammy Awards, but lost to Brandi Carlile's In These Silent Days.

== Track listing ==
No.	Title	Writer(s)	Producer(s)	Length
1.	"Good to Be (Home Again)"	Kevin Moore; Mark Ramos-Nishita	Vince Gill; Keb' Mo'	3:30
2.	"So Easy"	Moore; Phillip Ramocan	Keb' Mo'; Tom Hambridge	3:08
3.	"Sunny and Warm"	Moore; Steve Dorff	Keb' Mo'; Tom Hambridge	3:26
4.	"Good Strong Woman" (featuring Darius Rucker)	Moore; Jason Gantt; Jason Nix	Vince Gill; Keb' Mo'	3:18
5.	"The Medicine Man" (featuring Old Crow Medicine Show)	Moore	Keb' Mo'; Ketch Secor	3:37
6.	"Marvelous to Me"	Moore; John Lewis Parker	Keb' Mo'	3:34
7.	"Lean on Me"	Bill Withers	Keb' Mo'; Tom Hambridge	3:53
8.	"Like Love"	Moore; Dorff	Keb' Mo'; Tom Hambridge	3:40
9.	"All Dressed Up"	Moore; Parker	Keb' Mo'; Tom Hambridge	4:13
10.	"'62 Chevy"	Moore; Gantt; Nix	Vince Gill; Keb' Mo'	3:28
11.	"Louder"	Moore; Jenny Yates	Keb' Mo'; Tom Hambridge	4:23
12.	"So Good to Me"	Moore; Parker	Keb' Mo'; Tom Hambridge	3:46
13.	"Quiet Moments" (featuring Kristin Chenoweth)	Moore; David B. Oliver	Keb' Mo'	3:54
Total length:				47:50

== Charts ==
Chart (2022)	Peak position
German Albums (Offizielle Top 100)	64
Swiss Albums (Schweizer Hitparade)	28
UK Americana Albums (OCC)	15
UK Jazz & Blues Albums (OCC)	7
US Top Album Sales (Billboard)	55
US Top Current Album Sales (Billboard)	31
US Top Blues Albums (Billboard)	1
