= Big Wide Grin =

Studio album by Keb' Mo'
- Released: June 5, 2001
- Studio: Groove Masters (Santa Monica, CA); A Cut Above Studio (Ventura); House of Blues Studios (Encino, CA); Sony Music Studios (Santa Monica, CA)
- Genre: Delta blues
- Length: 48:18
- Label: Okeh; Sony Wonder
- Producer: Kevin McCormick

Keb' Mo' chronology
The Door (2000)	Big Wide Grin (2001)	Martin Scorsese Presents the Blues: Keb' Mo' (2003)

Professional ratings
Review scores
Source	Rating
AllMusic	3/5 stars
The Village Voice	(dud)

Big Wide Grin is the sixth studio album by American musician Keb' Mo'. It was released on June 5, 2001, via Okeh Records. Recording sessions took place at Groove Masters and Sony Music Studios in Santa Monica, at A Cut Above Studio in Ventura, and at House of Blues Studios in Encino. Production was handled by Kevin McCormick.

In the United States, the album peaked at number 199 on the Billboard 200 and atop the Billboard Kid Albums charts.

== Track listing ==
No.	Title	Writer(s)	Length
1.	"Everybody Be Yoself"	Charles Treetman	4:59
2.	"Love Train"	Kenneth Gamble; Leon Huff	4:29
3.	"Don't Say No"	Kevin Moore; Cynthia Tarr	4:17
4.	"Infinite Eyes"	Moore; John Lewis Parker; Essra Mohawk	4:57
5.	"Grandma's Hands"	Bill Withers	3:30
6.	"Color Him Father"	Richard Lewis Spencer	3:36
7.	"Family Affair"	Sylvester Stewart	3:47
8.	"The Flat Fleet Floogie"	Bulee Gaillard; Leroy Eliot Stewart; Moses David Grün	2:04
9.	"I Am Your Mother Too"	Moore; Zuriani Zonneveld	4:03
10.	"Big Yellow Taxi"	Joni Mitchell	3:45
11.	"Isn't She Lovely"	Stevie Wonder	5:16
12.	"America the Beautiful"	Samuel Augustus Ward; Katharine Lee Bates	3:35
Total length:			48:18

== Personnel ==
- Kevin "Keb' Mo'" Moore – vocals, guitar (tracks: 1–10, 12), harmonica (tracks: 1, 2, 11), banjo (track 2), keyboards (track 3), string synth (track 11)
- The Family – background vocals (tracks: 1, 3)
- Alex Brown – background vocals (tracks: 2, 3, 7)
- Bobette Harrison-Jamison – background vocals (tracks: 2, 3, 7)
- Randy Phillips – background vocals (track 2)
- Phillip Ingram – background vocals (tracks: 3, 7)
- Barbara Morrison – vocals (track 5)
- Camryn Manheim – background vocals (track 8)
- Brenda Russell – vocals (track 9)
- Perla Batalla – background vocals (track 10)
- Kevin Moore II – background vocals (track 10)
- Leo Nocentelli – guitar (track 1)
- Greg Leisz – pedal steel guitar (tracks: 2, 9), mandola (track 2), mandolin (track 9)
- Charlie Dennis – guitar (track 7)
- Clayton Gibb – banjo (track 3)
- Jeff Young – piano (tracks: 1, 7, 8, 11), organ (tracks: 1, 7), keyboards (tracks: 2, 3)
- Joellen Friedkin – electric piano (tracks: 4, 9), accordion (track 9)
- "Ready" Freddie Washington – bass (tracks: 1, 4, 9)
- Kevin McCormick – bass (tracks: 2, 3, 5, 7, 10), synth (track 7), producer, engineering
- Robert Hurst – upright bass (tracks: 8, 11)
- Sergio Gonzalez – drums (tracks: 1, 4, 5, 7, 9)
- Luis Conte – percussion (tracks: 1, 2, 4, 5, 9, 10)
- Laval Belle – drums (tracks: 2, 3)
- Gerald Albright – tenor saxophone (track 7), alto saxophone (track 11)
- Roy McCurdy – drums (tracks: 8, 11)
- Herb Gibson – vibraphone (tracks: 8, 11)
- Danilo Lozano – flute (track 10)
- Gabriel D. "Gabe" Veltri – engineering
- Ed Cherney – mixing
- Jim Denis – engineering assistant
- Mark Johnson – engineering assistant
- Bil Lane – engineering assistant
- Samie Barela – engineering assistant
- Doug Sax – mastering
- Robert Hadley – mastering assistant
- Mary Kramer – art direction
- Scott McLean – design
- Carl Studna – photography
- Hillary Bratton – A&R

== Charts ==
Chart (2001)	Peak position
US Billboard 200	199
