= Room on the Porch =

Studio album by Taj Mahal and Keb' Mo'
- Released: May 23, 2025
- Studios: Stu Stu (Franklin); Addiction Sound (Nashville); Kona (Redondo Beach); Joy Ride (Chicago)
- Genre: Blues
- Length: 43:45
- Label: Concord
- Producers: Keb' Mo'; Taj Mahal

Taj Mahal and Keb' Mo' chronology
TajMo (2017)	Room on the Porch (2025)

Taj Mahal chronology
Savoy (2023)	Room on the Porch (2025)	Time (2026)

Keb' Mo' chronology
Good to Be... (2022)	Room on the Porch (2025)	The Breakdown (2026)

Room on the Porch is the second collaborative studio album by American musicians Taj Mahal and Keb' Mo'. It was released on May 23, 2025, via Concord Records. Produced by the duo themselves, it features guest appearances from Ruby Amanfu and Wendy Moten.

Room on the Porch was nominated for a Grammy Award for Best Traditional Blues Album.

== Critical reception ==
Professional ratings
Aggregate scores
Source	Rating
Metacritic	76/100
Review scores
Source	Rating
All About Jazz	4/5 stars
AllMusic	4/5 stars
PopMatters	7/10
Tom Hull	B+

Room on the Porch was met with universal acclaim from music critics. At Metacritic, which assigns a normalized rating out of 100 to reviews from mainstream publications, the album received an average score of 76 based on five reviews.

AllMusic's Thom Jurek praised the album, calling it "a beautifully produced, modern, deep blues and roots album drenched in an all-inclusive Americana, generosity, and good vibes". Eoghan Lyng of PopMatters declared: "while the record isn't bold or brash, it is excellent fun, mirroring a camaraderie and respect heard on the 1985 country music effort by the Highwaymen, Highwayman". Tom Hull compared the album with the pair's previous effort, stating: "this one is better, perhaps because it's loose enough to just let that genius seep to the surface".

== Track listing ==
Room on the Porch track listing
No.	Title	Writer(s)	Length
1.	"Room on the Porch" (featuring Ruby Amanfu)	Kevin R. Moore; Henry St. Claire Fredericks Jr.; Ruby Amanfu; Ahmen Mahal	4:05
2.	"My Darling My Dear"	Fredericks; Moore; K. Roosevelt; Colin Linden; Mahal	3:58
3.	"Nobody Knows You When You're Down and Out"	Jimmy Cox	3:42
4.	"She Keeps Me Movin'"	Moore; Fredericks; John Oates	4:01
5.	"Make Up Your Mind"	Moore; Fredericks; Roosevelt; Mahal	4:40
6.	"Thicker Than Mud"	Moore; Fredericks; Linden; Roosevelt	4:38
7.	"Junkyard Dog"	Gabriel Barry Dixon; Maia Sari Sharp; Park Chisolm	4:20
8.	"Blues'll Give You Back Your Soul"	Fredericks	4:47
9.	"Better Than Ever" (featuring Wendy Moten)	Moore; Fredericks; Wendy Moten; Mahal	5:03
10.	"Rough Time Blues"	Jontavious Willis	4:31
Total length:			43:45

== Personnel ==
Credits adapted from the album's liner notes.

=== Musicians ===
- Keb' Mo' – vocals (all tracks), acoustic guitar (tracks 1, 2, 5–7, 9, 10), resonator guitar (1, 7), percussion (2, 9); slide guitar, banjo, octave mandolin (2); electric guitar (3, 4, 6–9); steel drum, harmonica (5); mandolin (9)
- Taj Mahal – vocals (1, 3–10), background vocals (2); percussion, acoustic guitar (5); ukulele (8, 9), resonator guitar (10)
- David Rodgers – Hammond organ (1, 5, 7–9), synthesizer (1, 5, 7, 9)
- Brian Allen – upright bass (1, 3, 8), bass (4, 5)
- K. Roosevelt – drums (1, 4–9), vibraphone (5), bass (9)
- Ruby Amanfu – vocals (1)
- Jenee Fleenor – violin (1)
- Robbie Brooks Moore – background vocals (1)
- Jimmy Nichols – Hammond organ (2, 3, 6), Wurlitzer (3)
- Anton Nesbitt – bass (2, 6, 7)
- Lauren Lucas – background vocals (2, 9)
- Michael B. Hicks – background vocals (3–6)
- Ron Poindexter – background vocals (3–6)
- Gene Miller – background vocals (3–6)
- Keio Stroud – drums (3)
- John Oates – background vocals (4)
- Jeff Coffin – saxophone (8)
- Billy Branch – harmonica (9)
- Wendy Moten – background vocals (9)

=== Technical ===
- Keb' Mo' – production
- Taj Mahal – production
- Zach Allen – recording, mixing
- Casey Wasner – recording
- Bobby Loudin – additional engineering
- David Kalmusky – additional engineering
- David Shivers – engineering assistance
- Ross Collier – engineering assistance
- Richard Dodd – mastering
- Jeff M. Bates – additional Keb' Mo' vocal recording
- Brian Leach – Billy Branch harmonica recording (9)

== Charts ==
Chart (2025)	Peak position
Austrian Albums (Ö3 Austria)	55
Croatian International Albums (HDU)	14
German Albums (Offizielle Top 100)	94
Scottish Albums (Official Charts)	86
Swiss Albums (Schweizer Hitparade)	7
UK Americana Albums (Official Charts)	21
UK Jazz & Blues Albums (Official Charts)	4
US Top Album Sales (Billboard)	28
US Top Current Album Sales (Billboard)	22
US Top Blues Albums (Billboard)	2
