= Suitcase (Keb' Mo' album) =

Studio album by Keb' Mo'
- Released: June 13, 2006
- Studio: Shangri La Studio (Malibu, CA); Stu Stu Studio (West Los Angeles, CA)
- Genre: Blues
- Length: 53:27
- Label: Epic
- Producer: John Porter

Keb' Mo' chronology
Peace...Back by Popular Demand (2004)	Suitcase (2006)	Live and Mo' (2009)

Professional ratings
Review scores
Source	Rating
AllMusic	3.5/5 stars
PopMatters	6/10

Suitcase is the ninth studio album by American musician Keb' Mo'. It was released on June 13, 2006, via Epic Records. Recording sessions took place at Shangri La Studio in Malibu and Stu Stu Studio in West Los Angeles. Production was handled by John Porter, who previously produced Mo's 1994 Keb' Mo' and 1996 Just Like You.

The album debuted at number 176 on the Billboard 200 and atop the Blues Albums charts in the United States. It received a Grammy Award for Best Contemporary Blues Album at the 49th Annual Grammy Awards, but lost to Irma Thomas' After the Rain.

The song "I See Love" off of the album was used as the theme song to the CBS television comedy series Mike & Molly, which aired from 2010 to 2016.

== Track listing ==
No.	Title	Writer(s)	Length
1.	"Your Love"	Kevin R. Moore	4:18
2.	"The Itch"	Moore; Jeff Paris	4:55
3.	"Eileen"	Moore	6:31
4.	"Remain Silent"	Moore; Allan Rich	4:42
5.	"Still There for Me"	Moore	3:10
6.	"Rita"	Moore	4:52
7.	"I'm a Hero"	Moore; James Ingram	4:45
8.	"Suitcase"	Moore; Jenny Yates	4:50
9.	"Whole 'Nutha Thang"	Moore; Mac Davis	3:55
10.	"I See Love"	Moore; Josh Kelley	3:59
11.	"I'll Be Your Water"	Moore	3:14
12.	"Life Is Beautiful"	Moore; Colin Linden	4:16
Total length:			53:27

== Personnel ==
- Kevin "Keb' Mo'" Moore – lead vocals, electric guitar (tracks: 1, 6, 7, 9, 10), National steel guitar (track 1), Pogreba resonator guitar (tracks: 2, 4), rhythm guitar (track 2), guitar & steel dobro (track 3), acoustic guitar (tracks: 5, 11, 12), National resonator guitar (track 8), banjo (track 10)
- Harry Bowens – backing vocals (tracks: 2, 4, 6, 10)
- Vincent Bonham – backing vocals (tracks: 2, 4, 10)
- Hillard "Sweet Pea" Atkinson – backing vocals (tracks: 2, 4, 10)
- Vida Simon – backing vocals (track 3)
- James Ingram – backing vocals (track 7)
- Fran Banish – electric guitar (tracks: 1, 4–7, 9), Volume Swells guitar (track 3), National resonator guitar (track 8), acoustic guitar (tracks: 10, 12)
- Kathleen Dyson – Leslie guitar (track 2)
- Greg Leisz – pedal steel guitar (tracks: 4, 6, 7)
- Terry Wollman – baritone electric guitar (track 5)
- Mike Finnigan – Hammond B3 organ (tracks: 1, 3, 5, 6, 10), Wurlitzer electric piano (track 7)
- Jon Cleary – Hammond B3 organ (tracks: 2, 4), piano (track 2), Wurlitzer electric piano (track 6)
- Jeff Paris – Wurlitzer electric piano (tracks: 2, 4, 9), mandolin (tracks: 8, 12)
- Reggie McBride – bass (tracks: 1–7, 9, 10, 12), upright bass (track 8)
- Sergio Gonzalez – drums (tracks: 1–7, 10)
- Steve Ferrone – drums (tracks: 2, 8, 9, 12)
- Paulinho da Costa – percussion (tracks: 2–7, 10)
- Joe Sublett – tenor saxophone (tracks: 4, 6, 9)
- Darrell Leonard – trumpet (tracks: 4, 6, 9), trombone (track 4), trombonium (track 6)
- Paul Oscher – harp (track 8)
- Gregory Tardy – clarinet (track 10)
- John Porter – mandolin solo (track 12), producer, recording, mixing
- JoAnn Tominaga – contractor, production coordinator
- Rik Pekkonen – recording
- Mark Johnson – additional engineering
- Pete Strobl – engineering assistant
- Stephen Marcussen – mastering
- David Bett – art direction
- Jeff Dunas – photography
- Michael Caplan – A&R direction

== Charts ==
=== Weekly charts ===
Chart (2006)	Peak position
US Billboard 200	176
US Top Blues Albums (Billboard)	1

=== Year-end charts ===
Chart (2006)	Position
US Top Blues Albums (Billboard)	7
