= Oklahoma (Keb' Mo' album) =

Studio album by Keb' Mo'
- Released: June 14, 2019
- Genre: Blues, Americana
- Length: 40:36
- Label: Concord Records
- Producer: Colin Linden; Keb' Mo'

Keb' Mo' chronology
TajMo (2017)	Oklahoma (2019)	Moonlight, Mistletoe & You (2019)

Singles from Oklahoma
- 1. "Put a Woman in Charge" Released: September 28, 2018; 2. "Don't Throw it Away" Released: June 12, 2019

Oklahoma is the fourteenth studio album by American musician Keb' Mo' and was released on June 14, 2019 by Concord Records label. The album featured guest contributions from Rosanne Cash, Jaci Velasquez, Robert Randolph, Taj Mahal and a duet with Robbie Brooks Moore (his wife). The album also produced two singles: "Put a Woman in Charge" released on September 28, 2018, and "Don't Throw it Away" released on June 12, 2019. The album was produced by Colin Linden and co-produced by Keb’ Mo’.

== Background ==
The lead single of the album was "Put a Woman in Charge" featuring Rosanne Cash and was released on September 28, 2018. On October 11, 2018 a music video was released for the song. The second single, "Don't Throw it Away" featuring Taj Mahal was released on June 12, 2019. He collaborated with the Plastic Pollution Coalition to release a music video to the song. On June 14, 2019 Mo released the song "Oklahoma" as a promotional single, as well as a lyric video to accompany it.

== Reception ==
"I Remember You" peaked at #7 on the Blues Digital songs chart, and #19 on the year-end chart.

Oklahoma won the Grammy Award for Best Americana Album at the 62nd Grammy Awards, his first Grammy in the American Roots category and his fifth win overall.

== Track listing ==
Credits adapted from Keb' Mo's website

No.	Title	Length
1.	"I Remember You"	4:13
2.	"Oklahoma"	3:59
3.	"Put a Woman in Charge" (featuring Rosanne Cash)	4:06
4.	"This Is My Home"	4:54
5.	"Don't Throw It Away" (featuring Taj Mahal)	2:58
6.	"The Way I"	3:22
7.	"Ridinʼ on a Train"	3:00
8.	"I Shouldʼve"	3:54
9.	"Cold Outside"	4:59
10.	"Beautiful Music" (featuring Robbie Brooks Moore)	3:35
Total length:		40:36

== Personnel ==
Adapted from Tidal

- Keb' Mo' – main vocals, guitar (Dobro, Acoustic, electric, steel, national steel), percussion, shaker, harmonica
- Rosanne Cash – vocals (track 3)
- Taj Mahal (track 5), Bass, b.v.
- Robert Randolph _ Lap steel guitar
- Jaci Velasquez
- Robbie Brooks Moore – vocals (track 10)
- Samuel Alexader - Organ [Hammond]], el. piano [wurlitzer]], keyboards
- Cremaine Booker - Cello
- Corie Covel, Andy Leftwich - Violin
- Markus Finnie - Drums
- Jim Hoke - Accordion, wurlitzer
- Scotty Huff - Trumpet
- DeMarco Jonson - Organ [Hammond]]
- Emeli Kohavi - Viola
- Eric Ramey - Bass guitar
- David Rodgers - Keyboards, wurlitzer
- Jovan Quallo - Saxophone
- Joshua Scalf - Trombone
- Keio Stroud - Drums
- Chester Thompson - drums

== Charts ==
Chart (2019)	Peak position
Swiss Albums (Schweizer Hitparade)	41
US Americana/Folk Albums (Billboard)	7
US Blues Albums (Billboard)	2
US Current Albums (Billboard)	48
US Hot Rock Albums (Billboard)	23
US Top Album Sales (Billboard)	71

=== Year-end charts ===
Chart (2019)	Position
US Blues Albums (Billboard)	8

Chart (2020)	Position
US Blues Albums (Billboard)	14
