= The Cat and the Fiddle (album) =

Cat & the Fiddle

Studio album by Papa John Creach
- Released: 1977
- Recorded: March 1977
- Studios: Quantam (Torrance, California); Woodland (Nashville, Tennessee); Toronto Sound (Toronto, Ontario)
- Genres: Rock; blues rock
- Label: Amherst/DJM
- Producers: Jack Richardson, Keith Gravenhorst

Papa John Creach chronology
| Rock Father (1976) | Cat & the Fiddle (1977) | Inphasion (1978) |

Professional ratings
Review scores
| Source | Rating |
|---|---|
| AllMusic | 2/5 stars |
| The Virgin Encyclopedia of the Blues | 2/5 stars |

The Cat and the Fiddle is an album by the American musician Papa John Creach, his first with DJM Records. Bryan Tilford and Mark Leon who performed in the band Midnight Sun on Rock Father return for this album, but Kevin Moore otherwise known as Keb' Mo' moved on and was replaced on this album with Joey Brasler. It was produced primarily by Jack Richardson.

== Track listing ==
Side one

1. "Country Boy, City Man" (Brian Tilford) – 3:19
2. "Keep On Rockin'" (Brian Cadd) – 3:43
3. "Livin' for Myself" (Donnell Jones) – 3:45
4. "Keep On Movin'" (Tom Seufert, Gregg Sutton) – 3:34
5. "Right Down" (Don Grady) – 3:40

Side two

1. "Let's Get Dancin'" (Tilford) – 4:29
2. "Foxy Lady" (Steve Haberman) – 3:49
3. "Rock & Roll Music" (Tilford) – 4:00
4. "Give Me Another Chance" (Joey Brasler, Roy Sciacca) – 3:15
5. "Pop Stop" (Haberman) – 5:00

== Personnel ==
- Steve Haberman – keyboards
- Bryan Tilford – bass, background vocals
- Mark Leon – drums, background vocals
- Joey Brasler – guitar
- Reid King – background vocals
- Papa John Creach – lead vocals, fiddle

Additional personnel

- Doug Riley – strings and horns arrangement
- Tracy Richardson – background vocals
- Rachel Oldfield – background vocals
- Al Stahaley – lead vocals on "Keep On Rockin'" and "Rock & Roll Music"
- Roy Sciacca – lead vocals on "Give Me Another Chance"
- Scott Cushnie – solo keyboard on "Give Me Another Chance"
- Bob Zimmitti – percussion

Production

- Jack Richardson – producer
- Keith Gravenhorst – producer, recording engineer
- Rich Lowler, Dave McKinley, Steve Vaughan – recording technicians
- Toronto Sound – tape mastering
- Cub Richardson – disc mastering engineer
- DFK / David Krieger – art direction
- Jim McCrary – photography
