= Live and Mo' =

Studio album / Live album by Keb' Mo'
- Released: October 20, 2009
- Recorded: Studio Tracks recorded at Stu Stu Studio, West Los Angeles, Ca
- Genre: Blues
- Length: 42:24
- Label: Yolabelle International
- Producer: Keb' Mo'

Keb' Mo' chronology
Suitcase (2006)	Live and Mo' (2009)	The Reflection (2011)

Professional ratings
Review scores
Source	Rating
about.com	3.5/5 stars
AllMusic	3.5/5 stars

Live and Mo' is the tenth studio album by Keb' Mo'. It was released on October 20, 2009. It is his first album released by the Yolabelle International label which he started after leaving Sony Music in 2004. It is his first album to include live recordings, intertwined with studio tracks hand-picked by Mo' himself. The album is underlined with soul and jazz, and has a laid-back feel to it.

== Track listing ==
1. "Victims Of Comfort" (Kevin Moore, Tim Kimber) - 4:00
2. "More Than One Way Home" (John Lewis Parker, Kevin Moore) - 4:58
3. "Change" (Kevin Moore) - 4:23
4. "Shave Yo' Legs" (Jeff Paris, Kevin Moore) - 4:43
5. "Hole In The Bucket" (John Lewis Parker, Kevin Moore) - 2:54
6. "One Friend" (Kevin Moore, Zuriani Zonneveld) - 3:26
7. "The Action" (Kevin Moore) - 4:33
8. "Perpetual Blues Machines" (Georgina Graper, Kevin Moore) - 5:27
9. "Government Cheese" (Kevin Moore) - 4:39
10. "A Brand New America" (John Lewis Parker, Kevin Moore) - 3:21

== Live personnel ==
- Keb' Mo' - guitars, harmonica, vocals
- Clayton Gibb - electric guitar, Dobro
- Jeff Paris - keyboards, vocals, mandolin
- Reggie McBride - bass guitar, vocals
- Les Falconer - drums, vocals

== Studio personnel ==
- Keb' Mo' - guitars, bass guitar (tr.1), vocals, harmonica (tr. 2), mandolin (tr. 2)
- Les King - bass guitar (tr.2)
- Kevin Moore II - drums (tr.1, 5, 10)
- Jeff Paris - keyboards (tr.1, 9)
- Courtney Branch - percussion (tr.1, 2, 9, 10)
- Lavalle Belle - drums (tr.9)
- Andrew Gouche' - bass guitar (tr.9)
- Tracy Carter - keyboards (tr.9)
- Paulie Cerra - tenor saxophone (tr.9)
- Paul Literall- trumpet (tr.9)
- Kevin McCormick - bass guitar (tr.10)
- Gregory Wachter - keyboards (tr.10)
- Agape Children's Choir - vocals (tr.10)
- Calabria Foti- violin (tr.10)

Tracks 1, 5, 9 and 10 are studio recordings. Tracks 2, 3, 4, 6, 7 and 8 are recorded live.
