= Moonlight, Mistletoe & You =

Studio album by Keb' Mo'
- Released: October 18, 2019
- Studio: Avatar, New York City; Capitol, Hollywood; Ocean Way, Nashville; Stu Stu, Franklin
- Genre: Blues, Christmas
- Length: 35:23
- Label: Concord Records
- Producer: Keb' Mo'

Keb' Mo' chronology
Oklahoma (2019)	Moonlight, Mistletoe & You (2019)	'Good to Be...' (2022)

Professional ratings
Review scores
Source	Rating
AllMusic	3/5 stars
Evening Standard	3/5 stars

Moonlight, Mistletoe & You is a studio album by American blues musician Keb' Mo' and was released on October 18, 2019, by Concord Records label. The album contains a collection of 10 Christmas songs. Guest musicians include Gerald Albright (saxophone) on "Moonlight, Mistletoe and You" and Melissa Manchester (vocals) on "I've Got My Love To Keep Me Warm".

== Reception ==
Phoebe Luckhurst of Evening Standard stated, "It's Christmas — the lounge classics version! And Keb’ Mo's blues-infused festive album is as schmaltzy as every holiday record." Stephen Thomas Erlewine of AllMusic wrote, "The inherent friendliness of Moonlight, Mistletoe and You buoys the first holiday album from veteran blues singer Keb' Mo' through its periodic shifts in tone and style... The entire album is a celebration."

== Track listing ==
No.	Title	Writer(s)	Length
1.	"Please Come Home For Christmas"	Charles Brown, Gene Redd	2:58
2.	"Moonlight, Mistletoe, and You"	Kevin Moore, Adam Ollendorff	3:29
3.	"Better Everyday"	Shamil Bakhtiyarov, Kevin Moore, Gary Nicholson	3:34
4.	"Santa Claus Santa Claus"	Theodore Edwards	3:55
5.	"Christmas Is Annoying"	Elaine Dempsey, Kevin Moore	2:12
6.	"Merry Merry Christmas"	Koko Taylor	4:34
7.	"I've Got My Love To Keep Me Warm"	Irving Berlin	4:17
8.	"Santa Claus Blues"	Charley Jordan	3:02
9.	"When The Children Sing"	Mac Davis, Kevin Moore	3:06
10.	"One More Year With You"	Beth Nielsen Chapman, Kevin Moore	4:16
Total length:			35:23

== Personnel ==
Acoustic Guitar – Keb Mo (tracks: 2, 9) David Rodgers (tracks: 10), Lendell Black (tracks: 2, 7), Michael B. Hicks (tracks: 9), Tyler Summers (tracks: 3, 7) - Arranged By

Hollie Hammer (tracks: 3), Jason Eskridge (tracks: 3), Michael B. Hicks* (tracks: 3), Theron Thomas II (tracks: 3) - Backing Vocals

Baritone Saxophone – Ryan Middagh (tracks: 10)

Bass – Joe Reed (tracks: 2 to 4), Reggie McBride (tracks: 7), Steve Mackey (tracks: 1, 6, 8)

Cello – Carole Rabinowitz (tracks: 2, 7)

Drum – Neil Tufano (tracks: 10) Drums – Chester Thompson (tracks: 2 to 4), Les Falconer (tracks: 7), Marcus Finnie (tracks: 1, 6), Neil Tufano (tracks: 5), Steve Jordan (tracks: 10)

Electric Guitar – Akil Thompson (tracks: 1 to 4, 6, 8), Keb Mo (tracks: 3)

Electric Upright Bass – Christian McBride (tracks: 10), Scott Mulvahill (tracks: 5)

Grand Piano – Shelly Berg (tracks: 10)

Guitar – Keb Mo (tracks: 1, 4 to 8, 10), Mike Pachelli (tracks: 7)

Keyboards – David Rodgers (tracks: 1, 6, 8), Phil Madeira (tracks: 2 to 4)

Organ – Phil Madeira (tracks: 3)

Percussion – Marcus Finnie (tracks: 10)

Piano – David Rodgers (tracks: 2, 7, 10), Michael B. Hicks (tracks: 3), Phil Madeira (tracks: 2)

Saxophone, Flute – Alex Graham (tracks: 10), Jovan Quallo (tracks: 10)

Tenor Saxophone – Evan Cobb (tracks: 7), Tyler Summers (tracks: 3, 7)

Trombone – Roland Barber (tracks: 10), Roy Agee (tracks: 3, 7, 10)

Trumpet – Quentin Ware (tracks: 10), Steve Patrick (tracks: 10), Vinnie Ciesielski (tracks: 3, 7)

Viola – Betsy Lamb (tracks: 2, 7), Simona Ruso (tracks: 2, 7)

Violin – Conni Ellisor (tracks: 2, 7), David Angell (tracks: 2, 7), David Davidson (tracks: 2, 7), Janet Darnall (tracks: 2, 7), Jenny Bifano (tracks: 2, 7), Kevin Winkelmann (tracks: 2, 7)

Vocals – Carter Moore (tracks: 9), Keb Mo, Melissa Manchester (tracks: 7), The Children Of NIA House Montessori School (tracks: 9)

== Charts ==
Chart (2019)	Peak position
US Blues Albums (Billboard)	1

=== Year-end charts ===
Chart (2020)	Position
US Blues Albums (Billboard)	13
