= Rainmaker (Kevin Moore album) =

Studio album by Keb' Mo'
- Released: 9 September 1980
- Studio: Golden Sound Studios, Hollywood, California
- Genre: Blues
- Label: Chocolate City
- Producer: Holden Raphael

Keb' Mo' chronology
Rainmaker (1980)	Keb' Mo' (1994)

Rainmaker is the 1980 debut album by Kevin Moore, now more commonly known as Keb' Mo'. The album features the songs "Rainmaker" and "Anybody Seen My Girl" which were subsequently re-released in Moore's later releases Slow Down and Keb' Mo' respectively.

== Track listing ==
1. "I Intend to Love You" (Kevin Moore, Andrea Weltman)
2. "Break Down the Walls" (Kevin Moore, John Lewis Parker)
3. "Anybody Seen My Girl" (Kevin Moore)
4. "Speak Your Mind" (Kevin Moore, Alex Brown)
5. "Rainmaker" (Kevin Moore, Pat Shepherd)
6. "The Way You Hold Me" (Kevin Moore)
7. "Rainy Day People (Rainy Day Lady, Rainy Day Man)" (Kevin Moore, Alex Brown)
8. "Holding on to You" (Bill Martin)

== Personnel ==
- Kevin Moore - vocals, acoustic and electric guitar
- Bobbi Walker - additional lead vocals
- Caleb Quaye - electric guitar
- Jervonny Collier - bass guitar
- Greg Mathieson, Michael King - keyboards
- Ian Underwood - synthesizer
- Ricky Lawson - drums
- Holden Raphael, Paulinho Da Costa - percussion
- Kim Hutchcroft - alto and tenor saxophone, alto flute
- Gary Grant, Jerry Hey - trumpet, flugelhorn
- Bill Reichenbach - trombone, bass trombone
- Alex Brown, Bill Champlin, Carmen Grillo, Carmen Twillie, Marva Holcolm, Tom Kelly, Venette Gloud - backing vocals
- Victor Hall - string arrangements
