= Papa John Creach =

American violinist (1917–1994)

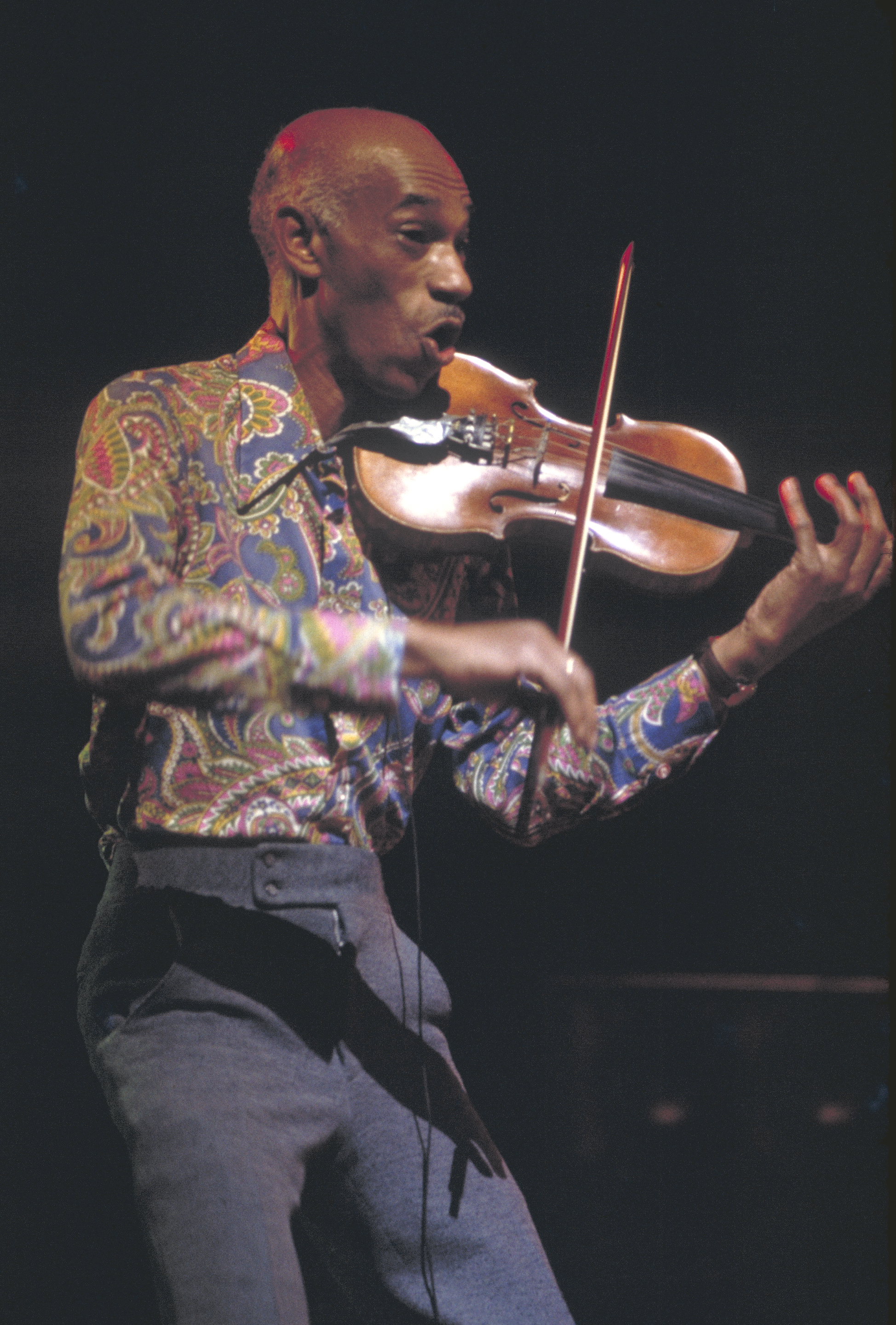
- Creach with Jefferson Starship in 1974

Background information
- Born: John Henry Creach; May 28, 1917; Beaver Falls, Pennsylvania, U.S.
- Died: February 22, 1994 (aged 76) Los Angeles, California, U.S.
- Genres: Blues, blues rock, psychedelic rock, classical, jazz
- Occupation: Musician
- Instrument: Violin
- Years active: 1935–1994
- Formerly of: Jefferson Airplane (1970–1973); Hot Tuna (1970–1974); Jefferson Starship (1974–1976; 1978 [touring member]); Jefferson Starship - The Next Generation (1992–1994); San Francisco All-Stars (1979–1984); Dinosaurs (1982–1989); Steve Taylor

John Henry Creach (May 28, 1917 – February 22, 1994), better known as Papa John Creach, was an American blues violinist who also played classical, jazz, R&B, pop and acid rock music. Early in his career, he performed as a journeyman musician with Louis Armstrong, Fats Waller, Stuff Smith, Charlie Christian, Big Joe Turner, T-Bone Walker, Nat King Cole and Roy Milton.

Following his rediscovery by drummer Joey Covington in 1967, he fronted a variety of bands (including Zulu and Midnight Sun) in addition to playing with Jefferson Airplane, Hot Tuna, Jefferson Starship, the San Francisco All-Stars (1979–1984), Dinosaurs (1982–1989) and Steve Taylor.

Creach recorded a number of solo albums and guested at several Grateful Dead and Charlie Daniels Band concerts. He was a regular guest at the early annual Volunteer Jams, hosted by Charlie Daniels, which exposed him to a new audience that was receptive to fiddle players.

== Early life and education ==
Creach was born in Beaver Falls, Pennsylvania. As a child, he was introduced to the violin by an uncle, and he received both tutoring in the instrument and conservatory training. Creach and his family moved to Chicago in 1935.

== Career ==
Once he relocated to Chicago, the teenager began playing violin in bars. He performed some symphonic work when he was in his early 20s, which was unusual for a black musician at the time. At one point, he joined a local cabaret trio called the Chocolate Music Bars and toured the Midwest with them.

According to Creach, knowing how to play in a variety of styles was a necessity to survive as a musician in Chicago at the time:

[B]ecause of all the nationalities [there], I had to learn to play everything. At some jobs it was strictly German music, or Polish. Now, they used to dance and knock holes in the floor.

He had some difficulty in learning to play jazz violin, having to adjust his bowing technique, but was helped when he purchased an electric violin in 1943. Moving to Los Angeles in 1945, he played in the Chi Chi Club, worked on an ocean liner for five years, appeared in several films, including with Nat King Cole in Fritz Lang's The Blue Gardenia, and performed as a duo with Nina Russell.

Creach initially met and befriended drummer Joey Covington at a union hiring hall in Los Angeles in 1967. When Covington joined Jefferson Airplane in 1970, he introduced Creach to them. In autumn 1970, he was invited to join both Jefferson Airplane and Hot Tuna, Jorma Kaukonen and Jack Casady's side band. He remained with both groups while also recording and touring as a solo artist for Jefferson Airplane's Grunt Records. During this period, his backing band Zulu included guitarist Keb' Mo'.

Creach left Hot Tuna in 1973, but remained on board when Jefferson Airplane was reorganized as Jefferson Starship in 1974. He toured and recorded with Jefferson Starship from 1974 to 1975, a period that included platinum selling album Red Octopus (1975). In August 1975, Creach left the band to focus on his solo career. Nevertheless, he remained on amicable terms with the group and briefly returned as a touring member for the band's spring 1978 engagements.

A year later, Creach renewed his working relationship with Covington as a member of the San Francisco All-Stars. He also performed with Covington's Airplane predecessor Spencer Dryden as a member of Dinosaurs. Creach continued to make occasional guest appearances with Hot Tuna. He was performing with them at the Fillmore Auditorium in 1988 when Jack Casady and Jorma Kaukonen of Hot Tuna reunited with Paul Kantner and Grace Slick for the first time on stage since 1972.

In 1992, Creach joined Kantner as a member of the relaunched Jefferson Starship and performed with them until his death.

== Death ==
Creach succumbed to congestive heart failure on February 22, 1994. Creach had been suffering from a heart condition that had been causing continual fluid build-up in his lungs, resulting in bouts of pneumonia. He was 76 years old.

Jefferson Starship performed a benefit concert to raise money for his family after his death and released tracks from their performances as the album Deep Space/Virgin Sky.

== Partial discography ==
- First Pull Up, Then Pull Down – Hot Tuna (1971)
- Bark – Jefferson Airplane (1971)
- Sunfighter – Paul Kantner & Grace Slick (1971)
- Papa John Creach (1971)
- Burgers – Hot Tuna (1972)
- Long John Silver – Jefferson Airplane (1972)
- Filthy! (1972)
- Thirty Seconds Over Winterland – Jefferson Airplane (1973)
- Baron Von Tollbooth & the Chrome Nun – Paul Kantner, Grace Slick & David Freiberg (1973)
- Playing My Fiddle for You (1974)
- Dragon Fly – Jefferson Starship (1974)
- Red Octopus – Jefferson Starship (1975)
- I'm The Fiddle Man (1975)
- Rock Father (1976)
- Michael Bolotin – Michael Bolton – "Every Day Of My Life" (1976)
- The Cat and the Fiddle (1977)
- Volunteer Jam III and IV – Charlie Daniels Band (1978)
- Inphasion (1978)
- Volunteer Jam VI – Charlie Daniels Band (1980)
- Historic Live Tuna – Hot Tuna (1985)
- I Predict 1990 – Steve Taylor (1987)
- Papa Blues (1992)
- Best of Papa John Creach (1994)
- Long Branch Park 1983 (2011)
