= Peace...Back by Popular Demand =

Studio album by Keb' Mo'
- Released: September 21, 2004
- Studios: At Conway Studios, The Village Recorder, House Of Blues Studios, Encino, Stu Stu Studio, Marina Del Rey, CA
- Genres: Blues, jazz
- Label: Sony
- Producer: Keb' Mo'

Keb' Mo' chronology
Keep It Simple (2004)	Peace...Back by Popular Demand (2004)	Suitcase (2006)

Peace...Back by Popular Demand is the eighth studio album by Keb' Mo'.

== Track listing ==
No.	Title	Writer(s)	Original artist	Length
1.	"For What It's Worth"	Stephen Stills	Buffalo Springfield	4:00
2.	"Wake Up Everybody"	John Whitehead, Gene McFadden, Victor Carstarphen	Harold Melvin & the Blue Notes	4:07
3.	"People Got to Be Free"	Felix Cavaliere, Eddie Brigati	The Rascals	3:45
4.	"Talk"	Keb' Mo'		3:38
5.	"What's Happening Brother" (featuring Bettye LaVette)	Gaye, James Nyx Jr.	Marvin Gaye	3:25
6.	"The Times They Are A-Changin'"	Dylan	Bob Dylan	4:11
7.	"Get Together"	Powers	Chet Powers	4:00
8.	"Someday We'll All Be Free"	Hathaway, Edward Howard	Donny Hathaway	4:02
9.	"(What's So Funny 'Bout) Peace, Love, and Understanding"	Nick Lowe	Brinsley Schwarz	3:43
10.	"Imagine"	Lennon	John Lennon	4:54

== Personnel ==
- Keb' Mo' - lead vocals, guitar (1), electric guitar, Dobro [steel] (2–4), guitar [solo] (5), el. guitar (7), ac. guitar, slide guitar (8), acoustic guitar, Dobro, mandolin, bass, percussion (9), acoustic guitar, Dobro [steel] (10)
- Greg Phillinganes - organ (2, 8), piano (10)
- Michael King - organ [Hammond] (3)
- Paul Jackson Jr. - acoustic guitar, electric guitar (4), el. guitar (5, 10)
- Harvey Mason - drums (4)
- Reggie McBride - bass (1–5, 7, 8, 10)
- Stephen Ferrone - drums (1–3, 5, 7–10)
- James Harrah - guitar (1) el. guitar (3, 5, 8, 10)
- Jeff Paris - organ [Hammond], electric piano (1, 7), piano, electric piano [Fender Rhodes] (2), keyboards (3), mandoline (4), piano (5, 6), el. piano (8), synthesizer (10)
- Paulinho Da Costa - percussion (1–5, 7–10)
- Lon Price - saxophone (1, 2, 3)
- Nicholas Lane - trombone (1, 2, 3)
- Brian Swartz - trumpet, flugelhorn (1, 2, 3)
- Nikka Costa - scat [soul scat vocal]
- Mindi Abair - soprano saxophone (5), alto saxophone [solo] (7)
- Karen Elaine Bakunin - viola (2, 10)
- Susan Chatman - violin (2, 10)
- Mark Cargill - violin, concertmaster (2, 10), fiddle (9)
