= Sessions at West 54th: Recorded Live in New York =

Video by Keb' Mo'
- Released: December 5, 2000
- Recorded: June 10, 1997
- Genre: Blues, pop, soul
- Length: 68 minutes
- Label: Sony

Keb' Mo' chronology
The Door (2000)	Sessions at West 54th: Recorded Live in New York (2000)	Keb' Mo' and Guests (2006)

Professional ratings
Review scores
Source	Rating
Amazon.com	4.5/5 stars

Sessions at West 54th: Recorded Live in New York is the first live music DVD by Keb' Mo', recorded in June 1997 which was then released in 2000. The performance was recorded for the television series Sessions at West 54th, a studio located in West 54th Street in New York City. The songs recorded on the album are all from Keb' Mo's two prior studio albums. Unlike the majority of Keb' Mo's albums, this contains no songs by Robert Johnson.

== Track listing ==
1. Program introduction
2. "I'm on Your Side"
3. "That's Not Love"
4. "You Can Love Yourself"
5. "Every Morning"
6. "Am I Wrong"
7. "Tell Everybody I Know"
8. "City Boy"
9. "Angelina"
10. "She Just Wants to Dance"
11. "Just Like You"
12. "Dirty Low Down and Bad"
13. "Anybody Seen My Girl"
14. "More Than One Way Home"
15. "Dangerous Mood"

== Personnel ==
- Keb' Mo' - guitar, harmonica, vocals
- Laval Belle - drums, percussion
- Reggie McBride - bass guitars
- Joellen Friedcken - keyboards
- Dr. John - piano, vocals (guest appearance)
