= Inphasion =

Studio album by Papa John Creach
- Released: 1978
- Recorded: 1978
- Studio: Dr. Musix, Beverly Hills, California
- Genre: Pop rock
- Label: DJM
- Producer: Pardo Jones

Papa John Creach chronology
The Cat and the Fiddle (1977)	Inphasion (1978)	Papa Blues (1992)

Inphasion is an album by the American musician Papa John Creach, released in 1978. It was his last with DJM Records. Creach would not record another studio album until 1992.

== Critical reception ==
Professional ratings
Review scores
Source	Rating
AllMusic	2/5 stars
The Encyclopedia of Popular Music	2/5 stars

AllMusic deemed the album "for the most part a pop-rock vocal collection with more guitar than violin."

== Track listing ==
Side one

1. "Inphasion" – 4:33
2. "Night Fire" – 4:49
3. "To Fill the Need" – 4:38
4. "Hezakiah" – 4:04
5. "Montuno Grande" – 3:21

Side two

1. "All the World Loves a Winner" – 4:07
2. "Somehow She Knows" – 4:06
3. "Silver Bird" – 6:03
4. "Flow with the Feeling" – 4:48
5. "Southern Strut" – 2:39

== Personnel ==
- Papa John Creach – fiddle, lead vocals
- Steve Haberman – keyboards, Brahms interlude on "Silver Bird"
- Bryan "Bug" Tilford – bass, lead vocals on "Silver Bird"
- Mark "Mujel" Leon – drums, percussion
- Joey Brasler – guitar
- Reid King – acoustic guitar, violin sound architect and vocals

Additional personnel

- Michael Garrard – synthesizer on "Inphasion"
- Bob Zimitti – percussion
- Johnny "Guitar" Watson – solo guitar on "All the World Loves a Winner"
- Dr. John – piano, organ on "All the World Loves a Winner" and "Southern Strut"
- Polly Cutter – background vocals on "All the World Loves a Winner"
- Joey Carbone – rhythm piano on "Silver Bird"
- David LaFlamme – fiddle on "Silver Bird"
- Darcus – vocals on "Flow with the Feeling"
- Charlie Daniels – fiddle duet with Papa John on "Southern Strut"
- The Silver Fish (David Silver, Juanita Curiel, Ernestine Goldstein) – background vocals
