= I'm the Fiddle Man =

Studio album by Papa John Creach
- Released: 1975
- Recorded: 1975 at Golden West Sound Recorders, Hollywood, California
- Genre: Rock; blues rock
- Label: Buddah
- Producer: Ed Martinez

Papa John Creach chronology
Playing My Fiddle for You (1974)	I'm the Fiddle Man (1975)	Rock Father (1976)

I'm the Fiddle Man is Papa John's fourth solo album and the first with Buddah Records. The album was recorded after Papa John Creach left Jefferson Starship following the successful album, Red Octopus. The supporting band on this album is known as Midnight Sun and had a similar lineup to Zulu on Playing My Fiddle for You. This album featured fewer original compositions than the previous album.

== Track listing ==
=== Side A ===
1. "I'm the Fiddle Man" (Kevin Moore, John Lewis Parker, Papa John Creach) – 4:02
2. "Stardust" (Mitchell Parish, Hoagy Carmichael) – 5:13
3. "Enjoy" (Arthur Freeman, Roberta Talmage, Joyce Robbins) – 2:35
4. "The Rocker" (John Lewis Parker, Creach) – 2:37
5. "Jim Dandy" (Gary St. Clair) – 4:08

=== Side B ===
1. "Joyce" (Arthur Freeman, Ed Martinez) – 4:50
2. "I Know Where I'm Goin'" (D. Gibbs) – 2:35
3. "Solitude" (Edgar DeLange, Irving Mills, Duke Ellington) – 3:33
4. "You Left Your Happiness" (Eddie Williams, Triune (Paula De Pores, Orena D. Fulmer and Ruth Stratchborneo)) – 3:05
5. "Fiddlin' Around" (Arthur Freeman, Ed Martinez) – 3:40

== Personnel ==
- Papa John Creach – electric violin, vocals
- Mark Leon – drums, vocals
- Kevin Moore – guitar, vocals
- John Lewis Parker – keyboards, vocals
- Holden Raphael – percussion, vocals
- Bryan Tilford – bass, vocals
- Arthur Freeman – arranger & conductor
- Wiliam Kurasch – concertmaster
- Ginger Blake, Maxine Willard Waters, Julia Tillman Waters – background vocals

=== Production ===
- Ed Martinez – producer
- Recorded at Golden West Sound Recorders, Hollywood, Calif.
- Bruce Ablin – recording engineer, mixdown engineer
- Mastered at Artisan Sound Recorders, Hollywood, Calif.
- Bob MacLeod Jr. – mastering engineer
- Sidney A. Sidenberg & Danny Kessler – management direction
- Ed Caraeff – design & photography
- Milton Sincoff – creative packaging direction
