= Playing My Fiddle for You =

Studio album by Papa John Creach
- Released: February 1, 1974
- Recorded: 1974 at RCA, Hollywood, California
- Genre: Rock; psychedelic rock; blues rock
- Label: Grunt/RCA
- Producer: Al Schmitt

Papa John Creach chronology
| Filthy! (1972) | Playing My Fiddle for You (1974) | I'm the Fiddle Man (1975) |

Professional ratings
Review scores
| Source | Rating |
|---|---|
| Allmusic | 3/5 stars |

Playing My Fiddle for You is Papa John Creach's third solo album and his last with Grunt Records. All the songs on the album are played with the supporting band Zulu, featuring Kevin Moore who would later be known as Keb' Mo'. After this album, the supporting band changed their name to Midnight Sun.

== Track listing ==
=== Side One ===
1. "Friendly Possibilities" (Zulu) – 4:08
2. "Milk Train" (Grace Slick, Papa John Creach, Roger Spotts) – 3:03
3. "I Miss You So" (Jimmy Henderson, Bertha Scott, Sid Robin) – 3:24
4. "String Jet Continues" (Creach) – 7:47

=== Side Two ===
1. "Playing My Music" (Zulu) – 3:40
2. "Git It Up" (Creach, Zulu) – 2:52
3. "Gretchen" (Creach, Zulu) – 3:46
4. "One Sweet Song" (Zulu) – 4:11
5. "Golden Dreams" (Zulu) – 3:08

== Personnel ==
- Papa John Creach – violin, vocals

=== Zulu ===
- Carl Byrd – drums, percussion, vocals
- Johnny Parker – clavinet, organ, celeste, vocals
- Holden Raphael – congas, percussion, harmonica
- Kevin Moore – guitar, cals
- Sam Williams – bass

=== Production ===
- Al Schmitt – producer
- Richie Schmitt – engineer
- Dennis Smith – assistant engineer
- Artie Torgersen – assistant engineer
- Marty Paich – horn arrangement
- Recorded at RCA Records, Hollywood
- H. B. Greene – cover design, photography

== Notes ==
- Playing My Fiddle for You (Vinyl back cover). Papa John Creach. New York City: Grunt Records. 1974. BFL1-0418.
