= BLUESAmericana =

Studio album by Keb' Mo'
- Released: April 22, 2014
- Studio: At Stu Stu Studio, Nashville, TN, USA.
- Genre: Blues, Americana
- Length: 38:10
- Label: Kind of Blue Music
- Producer: Keb' Mo'

Keb' Mo' chronology
The Reflection (2011)	BLUESAmericana (2014)	Keb' Mo' Live – That Hot Pink Blues Album (2016)

Professional ratings
Review scores
Source	Rating
Pop Matters	6/10 stars
AllMusic	3.5/5 stars

BLUESAmericana is the twelfth studio album by Keb' Mo'. It was released on April 22, 2014, through the Kind of Blue Music label. It earned a Grammy nomination for Best Americana Album.

== Track listing ==
1. "The Worst Is Yet to Come" (Heather Donovan/Kevin Moore/Pete Sallis) – 3:57
2. "Somebody Hurt You" (Kevin Moore/John Lewis Parker) – 3:34
3. "Do It Right" (Kevin Moore/Jim Weatherly) – 4:08
4. "I'm Gonna Be Your Man” (Kevin Moore/John Lewis Parker) – 4:34
5. "Move" (Tom Hambridge/Kevin Moore) – 4:32
6. "For Better or Worse" (Tom Hambridge/Kevin Moore) – 3:25
7. "That's Alright" (Jimmy Rogers) – 4:15
8. "Old Me Better" (Kevin Moore/John Lewis Parker) – 2:56
9. "More for Your Money" (Kevin Moore/Gary Nicholson) – 2:48
10. "So Long Goodbye" (Rebecca Correia/Kevin Moore) – 3:53

== Personnel ==
- Keb’ Mo' - Banjo ( tr.1, 3, 5, 8 ) Bass ( tr.2,4, 6, 7, 9, 10 ), Acoustic Guitar ( tr.3, 10 ), Electric Guitar ( tr.2, 7 ), Resonator Guitar ( tr.4 ), Harmonica ( tr.1, 3, 4, 7 ), Horn Arrangements, Keyboards ( tr.2, 4 ), Organ ( tr.3, 7, 10 ), Piano ( tr.10 ), Slide Guitar ( tr.3, 4, 6, 7 ), Tambourine ( tr.1 ), Electric Piano ( tr.5 ) Producer
- Brian Allen - Bass ( tr. 1, 5 )
- Zach Allen - Engineer, Tracking
- Brandon Armstrong - Sousaphone ( tr.8 )
- Roland Barber - Trombone ( tr.4 )
- Leigh Brannon - Production Manager, Project Manager
- Robbie Brooks-Moore - Background Vocals
- John Caldwell - Engineer, Tracking
- The California Feet Warmers - Featured Artist
- Rebecca Corriea - Composer
- Darcy Stewart - Background Vocals
- Charles Decastro - Trumpet ( tr.8 )
- Richard Dodd - Mastering
- Heather Donovan - Composer
- Paul Franklin - Pedal Steel ( tr.5, 6 )
- Tom Hambridge - Drums, Composer ( tr.5 )
- Michael Hanna - Piano, Organ ( tr. 1 ), piano ( tr.8 )
- Michael Hicks - Organ, Background Vocals ( tr.4, 5 )
- Ross Hogarth - Mixing
- Steve Jordan - Drums ( tr.7 )
- Joshua Kaufman - Clarinet ( tr. 8 )
- Tim Lauer - Organ, Piano ( tr.6, 8 )
- David Leonard - Engineer, Tracking
- Melvin “Maestro” Lightford - Horn Arrangements
- Colin Linden - Handclapping, Mandolin ( tr.1 )
- Andrea Lucero - Photography
- Jeffrey Moran - Banjo ( tr.8 )
- Patrick Morrison - Banjo [Plectrum] ( tr. 8 )
- Moiba Mustafa - Background Vocals
- Gary Nicholson - Composer
- John Lewis Parker - Composer
- Rip Patton - Vocals (Background)
- Jovan Quallo - Sax (Tenor) ( tr.4 )
- Juan Carlos Reynoso - Washboard ( tr.8 )
- Dominique Rodriguez - Drums [Parade] ( tr. 8 )
- Jimmy Rogers - Composer
- Justin Rubenstein - Trombone ( tr. 8 )
- Pete Sallis - Composer
- John Schirmer - Engineer, Tracking
- Meghan Aileen Schirmer - Cover Design, Package Design
- Victoria Shaw - Composer
- Tom Shinness - Cello, Mandolin (tr. 9 )
- Kevin So - Background Vocals
- Keio Stroud - Drums ( tr.1, 3, 4, 6, 8, 10 )
- Quentin Ware - Trumpet( tr.4 )
- Casey Wasner - Bass ( tr.3 ), Drums ( tr.2, 9 ), Engineer, Producer, Tracking
- Jim Weatherly - Composer
- Joe Wood - Handclapping
