= Papa Blues =

Studio album by Papa John Creach
- Released: 1992
- Genre: Blues
- Label: Bee Bump

Papa John Creach chronology
Inphasion (1978)	Papa Blues (1992)

Papa Blues is Papa John Creach's 1992 album, his final studio album, and his only album released after the 1970s.

== Track listing ==
1. "Sweet Life Blues" (Bernie Pearl) – 4:15
2. "Bumble Bee Blues" (traditional) – 5:17
3. "Old Fashioned Papa" (Pearl) – 5:03
4. "Big Leg Baby" (Lermon Horton) – 5:17
5. "Why Don't You Let Me Be" (Big Terry DeRouen) – 4:45
6. "Scufflin'" (Pearl) – 5:17
7. "Tired of Crying" (DeRouen) – 4:23
8. "Papa Blues" (Papa John Creach) – 6:25
9. "I Think You're Stepping Out on Me" (Doug MacLeod) – 3:42
10. "Train to Memphis" (Pearl) – 4:13
11. "Walking My Way Back to You" (Doug MacLeod) – 4:04
12. "Girl, You Must Be Crazy" (DeRouen) – 5:09
13. "Baby Please Don't Go" (Big Joe Williams) – 4:02

== Personnel ==
- Papa John Creach – electric violin, vocals

=== Bernie Pearl Blues Band ===
- Bernie Pearl – guitar, saxophone
- Big Terry DeRouen – guitar
- Mike Barry – bass
- Albert Trepagnier – drums
- Dwayne Smith – piano
