= Get on Board (Taj Mahal and Ry Cooder album) =

Studio album by Taj Mahal and Ry Cooder
- Released: April 22, 2022
- Recorded: July 9–11, 2021
- Studio: Temple of Leaves (Altadena, California); Wireland Studios (Chatsworth, California); Soul Lab Studio (Greensboro, North Carolina)
- Genre: Blues
- Length: 44:27
- Label: Nonesuch
- Producer: Ry Cooder

Taj Mahal chronology
TajMo (2017)	Get on Board (2022)	Savoy (2023)

Ry Cooder chronology
The Prodigal Son (2018)	Get on Board (2022)

Get on Board is a collaborative studio album by American musicians Taj Mahal and Ry Cooder. It was released on April 22, 2022, via Nonesuch Records. Recording sessions took place at Temple Of Leaves in Altadena and at Wireland Studios in Chatsworth from July 9 to 11, 2021, with the Ton3s' backing vocals were recorded at Soul Lab Studio in Greensboro.

At the 65th Annual Grammy Awards held on February 5, 2023, the album won a Grammy Award for Best Traditional Blues Album.

== Critical reception ==
Professional ratings
Aggregate scores
Source	Rating
AnyDecentMusic?	7.2/10
Metacritic	80/100
Review scores
Source	Rating
All About Jazz	4/5 stars
AllMusic	4/5 stars
Mojo	3/5 stars
PopMatters	8/10
Record Collector	4/5 stars
Rolling Stone	4/5 stars
Uncut	4/5 stars

Get on Board was met with generally favorable reviews from music critics. At Metacritic, which assigns a normalized rating out of 100 to reviews from mainstream publications, the album received an average score of 80 based on eight reviews. The aggregator AnyDecentMusic? has the critical consensus of the album at a 7.2 out of 10, based on five reviews.

AllMusic's Thom Jurek praised the album, stating: "Mahal and Cooder stay close to the originals, but whether faithfully evoking the sound and spirit of their mentors or using them as lift-off points for expansion, this glorious album honors their subjects with joy and swagger as well as devotion". George de Stefano of PopMatters declared: "whether they're being more or less faithful to the sound of Terry and McGhee or taking off from it, these two masters have made an album that honors the artists who inspired them so many years ago". David Browne of Rolling Stone wrote: "what could have been a tasteful salute becomes a record that's bristlingly, viscerally alive; it's like a ride in a classic old car with long-gone shock absorbers". Terry Staunton of Uncut called the album "a record that acts as both a good-humour history lesson and a rousing party-starter for future generations to discover".

In his mixed review for Mojo, James McNair concluded: "Mahal and Cooder are giving back here like so often before". However, Mojo ranked the album at No. 38 on its 'The 50 Best Albums of 2022' list.

== Track listing ==
No.	Title	Writer(s)	Length
1.	"My Baby Done Changed the Lock on the Door"	Will Weldon	4:15
2.	"The Midnight Special"	Walter McGhee; Saunders Terrell	3:26
3.	"Hooray Hooray"	Terrell; Leroy Kirkland	4:19
4.	"Deep Sea Diver"	W. McGhee	5:17
5.	"Pick a Bale of Cotton"	W. McGhee; Terrell	3:02
6.	"Drinkin' Wine Spo-Dee-O-Dee"	Granville McGhee; J. Mayo Williams	3:15
7.	"What a Beautiful City"	Traditional	4:11
8.	"Pawn Shop Blues"	Fulton Allen	5:51
9.	"Cornbread, Peas, Black Molasses"	W. McGhee; Terrell	3:43
10.	"Packing Up Getting Ready to Go"	Traditional	2:49
11.	"I Shall Not Be Moved"	Traditional	4:19
Total length:			44:27

== Personnel ==
- Henry St. Claire Fredericks – additional lyrics (track 10), vocals, guitar, piano, harmonica, arrangement (tracks: 1, 7, 8, 11), liner notes
- Ryland Peter Cooder – additional lyrics (track 10), vocals, guitar, banjo, mandolin, producer, arrangement (tracks: 1, 7, 8, 11), liner notes
- Joachim Cooder – additional lyrics (track 10), bass, drums
- The Ton3s – backing vocals (track 10)
- Ivy Skoff – contractor
- Martin Pradler – recording, mixing, mastering
- Laphelle Taylor – recording (track 10)
- Abby Ross – photography

== Charts ==
Chart (2022)	Peak position
Austrian Albums (Ö3 Austria)	19
Belgian Albums (Ultratop Flanders)	28
Belgian Albums (Ultratop Wallonia)	115
Dutch Albums (Album Top 100)	67
German Albums (Offizielle Top 100)	13
Scottish Albums (OCC)	10
Spanish Albums (PROMUSICAE)	75
Swiss Albums (Schweizer Hitparade)	2
UK Albums (OCC)	55
UK Album Downloads (OCC)	14
UK Americana Albums (OCC)	1
UK Jazz & Blues Albums (OCC)	1
US Top Album Sales (Billboard)	32
US Americana/Folk Albums (Billboard)	9
US Top Current Album Sales (Billboard)	23
US Top Blues Albums (Billboard)	2
