= Martin Scorsese Presents the Blues: Keb' Mo' =

Martin Scorsese Presents The Blues

Compilation album by Keb' Mo'
- Released: 2003
- Genre: Delta blues
- Label: Epic

Keb' Mo' chronology
Big Wide Grin (2001)	Martin Scorsese Presents The Blues (2003)	Keep It Simple (2005)

Professional ratings
Review scores
Source	Rating
The Penguin Guide to Blues Recordings	3/4 stars
AllMusic	4/5 stars

Martin Scorsese Presents The Blues: Keb' Mo' is a blues album by Keb' Mo', it was released in 2003 as part of Martin Scorsese's The Blues documentary series.

== Track listing ==
1. "Soon As I Get Paid" (Moore, Parker) - 4:37
2. "Come on in My Kitchen" (Johnson) - 4:08
3. "Perpetual Blues Machine" (Graper, Moore) - 3:15
4. "Don't Try to Explain" (Moore) - 3:57
5. "I'm on Your Side" (Moore) - 3:39
6. "Henry" (Moore, Parker) - 5:18
7. "Am I Wrong" (Moore) - 2:19
8. "A Letter to Tracy" (Moore, Parker) - 4:10
9. "Love in Vain" (Johnson) - 3:04
10. "Dirty Low Down and Bad" (Moore) - 3:09
11. "Every Morning" (Moore) - 2:58
12. "Dangerous Mood" (Moore, Parton) - 4:59
13. "It Hurts Me" (James, Sehorn) - 5:27
14. "Crapped Out Again" (Moore, Parker) - 2:32
15. "Love Blues" (Moore, Powell) - 3:02
16. "Peace of Mind" (King, Moore) - 4:11
