= Slow Down (album) =

Studio album by Keb' Mo'
- Released: August 25, 1998
- Recorded: At House Of Blues, Los Angeles; Rumbo Recorders & Westlake Audio studios
- Genre: Blues
- Length: 55:00
- Label: Epic
- Producer: Keb' Mo', John Lewis Parker

Keb' Mo' chronology
Just like You (1996)	Slow Down (1998)	The Door (2000)

Professional ratings
Review scores
Source	Rating
George Graham (WVIA-FM)	(Review)
AllMusic	2.5/5 stars
The Penguin Guide to Blues Recordings	2/4 stars

Slow Down is the fourth studio album by the blues performer Keb' Mo' released in August 1998. In 1999, Slow Down won Keb' Mo' his second Grammy Award for Best Contemporary Blues Album. The album includes the song "Rainmaker" which shares its title with the album Rainmaker, made by Keb' Mo' under his birth name "Kevin Moore".

== Track listing ==
Songs by Kevin Moore aka (Keb' Mo')
No.	Title	Writer(s)	Length
1.	"Muddy Water"	Kevin Moore, Georgina Graper	4:21
2.	"I Was Wrong"	Moore, Anders Osborne	4:21
3.	"Everything I Need"	Moore, Charles Edward Streetman	3:56
4.	"Henry"	Moore, John Lewis Parker	5:20
5.	"Soon As I Get Paid"	Moore, Parker	4:38
6.	"A Better Man"	Moore, Osborne	5:16
7.	"I Don't Know"	Moore, Graper	4:12
8.	"A Letter to Tracy"	Moore, Parker	4:09
9.	"Slow Down"	Moore, Parker	4:52
10.	"Rainmaker"	Moore, Patrick Shepard	4:15
11.	"Love in Vain"	Robert Johnson	3:05
12.	"God Trying to Get Your Attention"	Moore, Colin Linden	4:09
13.	"I'm Telling You Now"	Moore, Bruce E. Fisher	2:35

== Personnel ==
- John Lewis Parker and Keb' Mo' – producers
- Keb' Mo' – vocals, guitars, harmonica
- Laval Belle – drums
- Reggie McBride – bass guitar
- Joellen Friedkin – keyboards (tracks 1, 2, 4, 5, 10, 12), accordion, synthesizer (track 3)
- Munyungo Jackson – percussion (tracks 1, 3, 12)
- Colin Linden – guitars, mandolin
- John Lewis Parker – keyboards, sampling on "Slow Down"
- John Barnes – keyboards on "I Don't Know"
- Anders Osborne – guitars on "I Was Wrong"; guitars and background vocals on "A Better Man"; background vocals on "God Trying to Get Your Attention"
- Reggie Young – trombone on "Slow Down"
- Gerald Albright – tenor saxophone on "Slow Down"
- Sir Harry Bowens – background vocals on "I Was Wrong", "A Better Man", "God Trying to Get Your Attention"
- Sweet Pea Atkinson – background vocals on "I Was Wrong", "God Trying to Get Your Attention"
- Lisa Linson – background vocals on "God Trying to Get Your Attention"
- Chuck Trammell – producer on "Rainmaker"

Keb' Mo' uses Gibson & Epiphone Guitars, D'Addario Strings, National Resophonic Guitars, Moonshine Slides and Larry Pogreba Custom Guitars

== Charts ==
Chart performance for Slow Down
Chart (1998)	Peak position
Australian Albums (ARIA)	89
German Albums (Offizielle Top 100)	38
New Zealand Albums (RMNZ)	6
Swiss Albums (Schweizer Hitparade)	35
US Billboard 200	109
