= Rock Father =

Studio album by Papa John Creach
- Released: 1976
- Recorded: 1976
- Genre: Rock; blues rock
- Label: Buddah
- Producer: Ed Martinez; Art Martinez

Papa John Creach chronology
I'm the Fiddle Man (1975)	Rock Father (1976)	The Cat and the Fiddle (1977)

Rock Father is Papa John Creach's fifth solo album and his last with Buddah Records. The tracks are recorded with the band Midnight Sun, with the same lineup that played on I'm the Fiddle Man.

== Track listing ==
1. "Travelin' On'" (Midnight Sun, Papa John Creach) – 3:40
2. "High Gear" (John Lewis Parker, Kevin Moore, Creach) – 5:08
3. "Ol' Man River" (Oscar Hammerstein, Jerome Kern) – 3:22
4. "Slow Groove" (Dick Monda) – 2:23
5. "J. V. and Me" (Arthur Freeman, Ed Martinez) – 3:20
6. "Straight Ahead" (Arthur Freeman, Ed Martinez) – 3:48
7. "I Like All Kinds of Music" (John Lewis Parker, Kevin Moore, Creach) – 3:43
8. "Brand New Day" (John Lewis Parker, Creach) – 3:18
9. "Jump Up, Gimme Some Dancing" (Dick Monda) – 2:35
10. "Orange Blossom Special" (Ervin T. Rouse) – 3:33

== Personnel ==
- Papa John Creach – electric violin, vocals
- Mark Leon – drums, vocals
- Kevin Moore – electric guitar, acoustic guitar, vocals
- John Lewis Parker – piano, organ, clavinet, Arp odyssey, vocals
- Holden Raphael – congas, percussion, bells, harps, vocals
- Bryan Tilford – bass, vocals

=== Additional Personnel ===
- Al Vescovo – steel guitar, banjo
- Reid King – vocals, equipment
- Arthur Freeman – Arp strings
