= Keep It Simple (Keb' Mo' album) =

Studio album by Keb' Mo'
- Released: February 10, 2004
- Studio: The Village Recorders (West Los Angeles, CA); House of Blues Studio (Encino, CA); Stu Stu Studio (West Los Angeles, CA); Blackbird Studio (Nashville, TN)
- Genre: Blues
- Length: 47:18
- Label: Okeh; Epic
- Producer: Keb' Mo'

Keb' Mo' chronology
Martin Scorsese Presents the Blues: Keb' Mo' (2003)	Keep It Simple (2004)	Peace...Back by Popular Demand (2004)

Professional ratings
Review scores
Source	Rating
AllMusic	3/5 stars
The Penguin Guide to Blues Recordings	2.5/4 stars

Keep It Simple is the seventh studio album by American musician Keb' Mo'. It was released on February 10, 2004, via Okeh Records. Recording sessions took place at the Village Recorders and Stu Stu Studio in West Los Angeles, House of Blues Studio in Encino, CA and Blackbird Studio in Nashville. The album won the Grammy Award for Best Contemporary Blues Album at the 47th Annual Grammy Awards held on February 13, 2005.

== Track listing ==
No.	Title	Writer(s)	Length
1.	"France"	Kevin Roosevelt Moore	2:51
2.	"Let Your Light Shine"	Jenny Yates; Moore	4:07
3.	"One Friend"	Zuriani Zonneveld; Moore	3:04
4.	"Shave Yo' Legs"	Jeff Paris; Moore	4:14
5.	"Prosperity Blues"	Eric Lynn; Moore	3:26
6.	"Closer"	La Rombé; Moore	4:17
7.	"Keep It Simple"	Kevin McCormick; Moore	4:57
8.	"Riley B. King"	Robben Ford; Moore	5:17
9.	"House In California"	Gary Nicholson; Moore	2:43
10.	"Walk Back In"	Bill Medley; Moore	5:22
11.	"I'm Amazing"	Robbie Brooks; Moore	3:14
12.	"Proving You Wrong"	Darrell Scott; Moore	3:46
Total length:			47:18

== Personnel ==
- Kevin "Keb' Mo'" Moore – vocals, guitar (tracks: 1–7, 9–12), bass (tracks: 2, 5, 6), steel mandolin (tracks: 2, 4), harmonica (tracks: 5, 12), Bazuki banjo (tracks: 6, 12), mandolin (track 6), banjo (tracks: 9, 12), percussion (track 9), synth (track 12), producer
- Alex Brown – backing vocals (tracks: 2, 10, 11)
- Bobette Jamison-Harrison – backing vocals (tracks: 2, 10, 11)
- Phillip Ingram – backing vocals (tracks: 2, 10, 11)
- Shannon Curfman – backing vocals (track 3)
- Robben Ford – backing vocals & rhythm guitar (track 8)
- Robert Cray – backing vocals & rhythm guitar (track 8)
- Andrea Zonn – backing vocals (track 9), violin (tracks: 6, 9)
- Amy Grant – backing vocals (track 9)
- Vince Gill – backing vocals (track 9)
- Greg Phillinganes – piano (tracks: 1, 2, 4, 5), keyboards (track 3), electric piano (track 10)
- Reggie McBride – bass (tracks: 1, 7–9, 11)
- Ricky Lawson – drums (tracks: 1–6, 10)
- Jeff Paris – harmonica (tracks: 1, 7), organ (tracks: 2, 4, 10), mandolin (track 2), keyboards (track 8), piano (track 11)
- Munyungo Jackson – percussion (tracks: 2, 4, 6)
- Nathan East – bass (tracks: 3, 4, 10)
- Steve Ferrone – drums (tracks: 7–9, 11)
- Sam Bush – mandolin (track 9)
- John Hobbs – electric piano (tracks: 11, 12)
- John Porter – guitar (track 12)
- Willie Weeks – bass (track 12)
- Chad Cromwell – drums (track 12)
- Paul Franklin – dobro (track 12)
- Mark Johnson – recording, mixing
- Andy Brohard – additional engineering
- Jason Wormer – additional engineering
- Kevin Meeker – additional engineering
- Vance Powell – additional engineering
- Ok Hee Kim – engineering assistant
- Yasuhiro Takeuchi – engineering assistant
- Stephen Marsh – mastering
- David Bett – art direction
- Frank W. Ockenfels III – photography
- JoAnn Tominaga – production coordinator
- Pete Ganbarg – A&R
- Farra Mathews – A&R
- John Boncimino – management

== Charts ==
Chart (2004)	Peak position
French Albums (SNEP)	150
Swiss Albums (Schweizer Hitparade)	93
US Billboard 200	149
US Top Blues Albums (Billboard)	1
