= The Door (Keb' Mo' album) =

Studio album by Keb' Mo'
- Released: October 10, 2000
- Genre: Delta blues
- Label: OKeh, Epic
- Producer: Keb' Mo', Russ Titelman

Keb' Mo' chronology
| Slow Down (1998) | The Door (2000) | Sessions at West 54th (2000) |

Professional ratings
Review scores
| Source | Rating |
|---|---|
| AllMusic | 3/5 stars |
| The Encyclopedia of Popular Music | 4/5 stars |
| The Penguin Guide to Blues Recordings | 2/4 stars |

The Door is a studio album by Delta blues artist Keb' Mo', released in 2000.

The album peaked at No. 122 on the Billboard 200. It was nominated for a Grammy, for "Best Contemporary Blues Album".

== Production ==
Co-produced by Russ Titelman, the album employed many well-known session musicians.

== Critical reception ==
The Washington Post wrote that "even when he updates the Elmore James classic 'It Hurts Me Too' with an arrangement that weds a funk beat to a wash of electronics, Mo' makes the transition from analog to digital age seem smooth, if not exactly welcome." The Chicago Tribune thought that the "acoustic, adult-contemporary blues style becomes more sophisticated with every album." OC Weekly deemed the album "a disappointment," calling it "more James Taylor than Skip James." The Record wrote that "this Los Angeles musician's urban folk-blues stew remains disarmingly soothing."

== Track listing ==
All songs written by Kevin Moore (Keb' Mo') unless otherwise noted.

1. "The Door" (Moore, Leon Ware)
2. "Loola Loo" (Moore, Bobby McFerrin)
3. "It Hurts Me Too" (Mel London)
4. "Come on Back"
5. "Stand Up (And Be Strong)" (Moore, Clayton Gibb)
6. "Anyway"
7. "Don't You Know"
8. "It's All Coming Back" (Moore, John Lewis Parker)
9. "Gimme What You Got" (Moore, Kevin McCormick)
10. "Mommy Can I Come Home" (Moore, Melissa Manchester)
11. "Change"
12. "The Beginning" (Moore, Bobby McFerrin)

== Personnel ==
- Keb' Mo' - guitars, banjo, harmonica, vocals
- Jim Keltner, Steve Jordan - drums
- Sergio Gonzalez - percussion, drums
- Reggie McBride - bass
- Scarlet Rivera - violin
- Greg Leisz - pedal steel guitar
- Greg Phillinganes - synthesizer, pedal steel guitar, keyboards
- David Mann, Lawrence Feldman - saxophones
- Thomas Tally - viola
- Gerri Sutyak - cello
- Leon Ware, Dennis Collins, Marva Hicks - backing vocals
