= Keb' Mo' (album) =

Studio album by Keb' Mo'
- Released: June 27, 1994
- Studio: Red Zone Studios, Burbank, California; Penguin Recording, Pasadena, California; Devonshire Studios, Burbank, North Hollywood
- Genre: Delta blues, country blues
- Length: 43:54
- Label: Epic
- Producer: John Porter

Keb' Mo' chronology
Rainmaker (1980)	Keb' Mo' (1994)	Just like You (1996)

Professional ratings
Review scores
Source	Rating
AllMusic	4/5 stars
The Penguin Guide to Blues Recordings	3.5/4 stars
Rolling Stone	4/5 stars

Keb' Mo' is the second studio album by Delta blues artist Keb' Mo'. Commonly thought of as his debut, the artist previously released an album in 1980, Rainmaker, under his birth name "Kevin Moore" (of which "Keb' Mo'" is a variation).

== Track listing ==
All songs written by Kevin Moore (Keb' Mo') unless otherwise noted.

1. "Every Morning" – 3:00
2. "Tell Everybody I Know" – 3:10
3. "Love Blues" – 3:02 (Kevin Moore, Eugene Powell)
4. "Victims Of Comfort" – 3:21 (Kevin Moore, Tim Kimber)
5. "Angelina" – 3:47 (Kevin Moore, Georgina Graper)
6. "Anybody Seen My Girl" – 2:56
7. "She Just Wants To Dance" – 3:29 (Kevin Moore, Georgina Graper)
8. "Am I Wrong" – 2:19
9. "Come On In My Kitchen" – 4:09 (Robert Johnson)
10. "Dirty Low Down And Bad" – 3:08
11. "Don't Try To Explain" – 3:58
12. "Kindhearted Woman Blues" – 3:29 (Robert Johnson)
13. "City Boy" – 4:05

== Personnel ==
- Keb' Mo' – vocals, guitars, harmonica, banjo
- Tommy Eyre – keyboards
- James "Hutch" Hutchinson – bass guitar
- Laval Belle – drums
- Quentin Dennard – drums on "Angelina"
- Tony Braunagel – percussion on "Come On in My Kitchen"
- John Porter - Producer
- Joe McGrath - Engineer

== Charts ==
Chart performance for Keb' Mo'
Chart (1996)	Peak position
Australian Albums (ARIA)	88
