= Just like You (Keb' Mo' album) =

Just Like You

Studio album by Keb' Mo'
- Released: June 18, 1996
- Genre: Delta blues
- Length: 46:10
- Label: Epic
- Producer: John Porter

Keb' Mo' chronology
| Keb' Mo' (1994) | Just Like You (1996) | Slow Down (1998) |

Professional ratings
Review scores
| Source | Rating |
|---|---|
| AllMusic | 3/5 stars |
| The Penguin Guide to Blues Recordings | 2.5/4 stars |

Just Like You is the third studio album by Delta blues artist Keb' Mo', released in 1996. It features guest artists Jackson Browne and Bonnie Raitt, both on the title track "Just Like You". Unlike the first album, Just Like You features a more blues-pop to blues-rock feel and more of its tracks feature a full band. In 1997, Just Like You won the Grammy Award for Best Contemporary Blues Album.

== Track listing ==
All songs written by Kevin Moore (Keb' Mo') unless otherwise noted.

1. "That's Not Love" - 4:08 (Georgina Graper, Kevin Moore)
2. "Perpetual Blues Machine" - 3:16 (Georgina Graper, Kevin Moore)
3. "More Than One Way Home" - 4:53 (John Lewis Parker, Kevin Moore)
4. "I'm on Your Side" - 3:40
5. "Just Like You" - 3:26 (John Lewis Parker, Kevin Moore)
6. "You Can Love Yourself" - 2:33
7. "Dangerous Mood" - 4:59 (Candy Parton, Kevin Moore)
8. "The Action" - 3:59
9. "Hand It Over" - 2:55
10. "Standin' at the Station" - 3:13 (Phil Ramocon, Kevin Moore)
11. "Momma, Where's My Daddy?" - 3:07 (Lori Barth, Kevin Moore)
12. "Last Fair Deal Gone Down" - 3:47 (Robert Johnson)
13. "Lullaby Baby Blues" - 2:36 (Georgina Graper, Kevin Moore)

== Personnel ==
- Keb' Mo' – vocals, guitar, harmonica
- James "Hutch" Hutchinson – bass guitar
- Tommy Eyre – keyboards; 11-string guitar on "Momma, Where's My Daddy"
- Laval Belle – (tracks A1, A3, A4, B1, B4, B6), Ricky Fataar – drums (tracks A5, B2)
- Darryl J. Munyungo Jackson – percussion
- Jackie Farris, Jean McClain – backing vocals
- Bonnie Raitt, Jackson Browne — vocals on "Just Like You"
- John Porter – dobro on "Last Fair Deal Gone Down"
- Larry David – harmonica on "Last Fair Deal Gone Down"
- Darrell Leonard – trumpet on "Last Fair Deal Gone Down"
- Jim Price – trombone on "Last Fair Deal Gone Down"
- James Wells Gordon – clarinet on "Last Fair Deal Gone Down"

== Charts ==
Chart performance for Just like You
| Chart (1997) | Peak position |
|---|---|
| Australian Albums (ARIA) | 97 |
| German Albums (Offizielle Top 100) | 78 |
| New Zealand Albums (RMNZ) | 14 |
| Swiss Albums (Schweizer Hitparade) | 39 |
| US Billboard 200 | 197 |
