= Casey Wasner =

American singer-songwriter

Casey Wasner (born 1983/1984) is an American singer, songwriter and musician from Northfield, Minnesota . He is the son of Craig and Linda Wasner who are also from southern Minnesota. Casey is one of many musicians in the Wasner family.

== Early life ==
Wasner was born in Northfield, Minnesota to Craig and Linda Wasner. As a child he had a passion for music. He is a 2001 graduate of Northfield High School. Eventually after graduating high school he became a drummer in Nashville, Tennessee.

== Music career ==
On February 21, 2013, Wasner debuted and released his self-titled first album ‘Casey Wasner’ which consists of 11 songs. He continues to write music and go on tours in the southeastern United States.
