= Keb' Mo' =

American blues singer, guitarist and songwriter (born 1951)

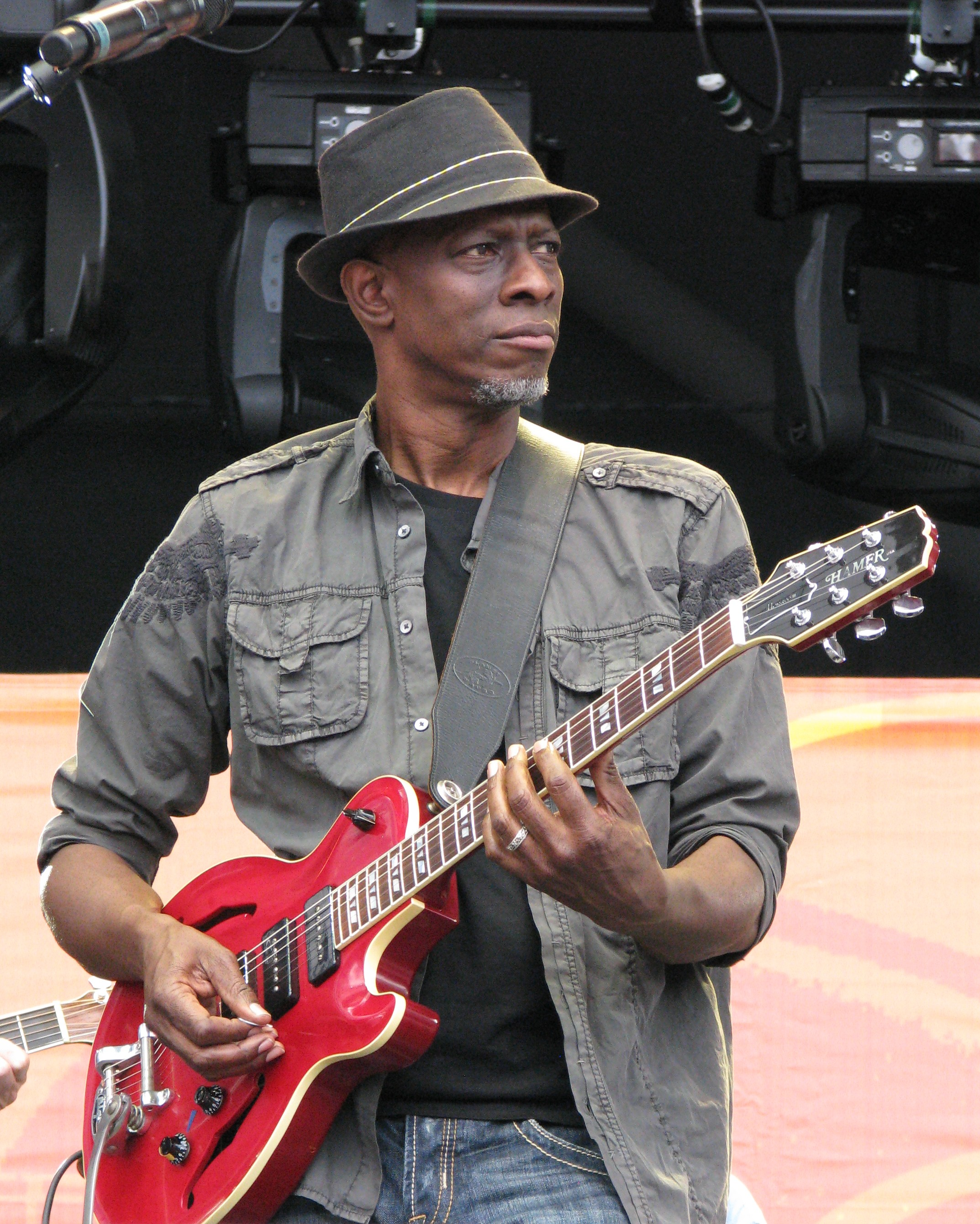
- Keb' Mo', with a Hamer guitar, at the Crossroads Guitar Festival, June 26, 2010

Background information
- Born: Kevin Roosevelt Moore; October 3, 1951 (age 75); South Los Angeles, California, U.S.
- Genres: Delta blues, country blues, Americana
- Occupations: Singer-songwriter, guitarist
- Instruments: Vocals, guitar, harmonica, banjo, mandolin, bass, keyboards
- Years active: 1970s–present
- Labels: Chocolate City, Epic, Yolabelle International, Kind Of Blue Music, Concord/Rounder

Kevin Roosevelt Moore (born October 3, 1951), known as Keb' Mo', is an American blues musician. He is a singer, guitarist and songwriter, living in Nashville, Tennessee. He has been described as "a living link to the seminal Delta blues that travelled up the Mississippi River and across the expanse of America." His post-modern blues style is influenced by many eras and genres, including folk, rock, jazz, pop and country. The moniker "Keb Mo" was coined by his original drummer, Quentin Dennard, and picked up by his record label as a "street talk" abbreviation of his given name.

== Biography ==
=== Early life ===
From early on, Keb' Mo's parents, who were from Louisiana and Texas, instilled in him a great appreciation for the blues and gospel music. By adolescence, he was an accomplished guitarist.

=== Career ===
Keb' Mo' started his musical career playing the steel drums in a calypso band. He moved on to play in a variety of blues and backup bands throughout the 1970s and 1980s. He first started recording in the early 1970s with Jefferson Airplane violinist Papa John Creach through an R&B group. Creach hired him when Moore was 21 years old and Moore appeared on four of Creach's albums: Filthy!, Playing My Fiddle for You, I'm the Fiddle Man and Rock Father. Keb' Mo's first gold record was received for a song, "Git Fiddler", which he co-wrote with Creach on Jefferson Starship's Red Octopus. Red Octopus hit number one on the Billboard 200 in 1975.

Moore was also a staff writer for A&M Records and arranged demos for Almo – Irving music. Keb' Mo's debut, Rainmaker, was released on Chocolate City Records, a subsidiary of Casablanca Records, in 1980. He was further immersed in the blues with his long stint in the Whodunit Band, headed by Bobby "Blue" Bland producer Monk Higgins. Moore jammed with Albert Collins and Big Joe Turner and emerged as an inheritor of a guarded tradition and as a genuine original.

Keb' Mo' has appeared on stage (1990–1993) in several versions of the musical Spunk, by George C. Wolfe, an adaptation of three short stories by Zora Neale Hurston. His character, Guitar Man, learned while he was an understudy to "Chick Streetman", played all the actual music in the play while performing. The character of Guitar Man is the foundation for his stage persona.

In 1994, Keb' Mo' released his self-titled album, Keb' Mo', which featured two Robert Johnson classics, "Come On In My Kitchen" and "Kind Hearted Woman Blues". In the Martin Scorsese miniseries The Blues, Keb' Mo' states that he was greatly influenced by Johnson. Keb' was the runner-up for Best New Blues Artist at The Long Beach Blues Festival, where he was spotted by Steve LaVere, who owns the publishing for the entire Robert Johnson song catalogue (1992–93).

Keb' Mo's self-titled album was released on Okeh Records, a vintage revival division of Sony Music.

In 1996, he released Just Like You, his second album, which featured 12 songs full of Delta rhythms. He won his first Grammy Award for this album, which featured guest appearances from Jackson Browne and Bonnie Raitt.

On June 10, 1997, Moore performed on the television program Sessions at West 54th. He joined musicians Laval Belle on drums, Reggie McBride playing bass and Joellen Friedkin on keyboards to perform 14 songs, some from each of his albums. Blues pianist Dr. John also made a guest appearance. This session (known as Sessions at West 54th: Recorded Live in New York) was shown on television but was not released as a DVD until late 2000.

In 1998, Moore was involved in the multi-artist project "Begegnungen (Encounters)" by German rock musician Peter Maffay. They performed together a new version of Mo's "Am I Wrong" on the album and some more songs in the 30 concerts at the arena tour later the same year, documented on the live album Begenungen Live, released in early 1999. A further guest of Maffay at the Begegnungen album and tour was Sonny Landreth and many more artists from around the world.

Slow Down, his next album, was released in 1998 and featured twelve songs. It earned him a second Grammy Award. The album begins with the song "Muddy Water", a tribute to Muddy Waters. It also features a song titled "Rainmaker", which had been released previously on his first album, eighteen years prior.

His fourth album, The Door, was released in 2000. The same year, Keb' Mo' released Big Wide Grin, a children's album featuring many songs from Moore's own childhood, along with some newer children's songs and some by Moore himself. In 2001, he appeared on Sesame Street with Kermit the Frog, Grover, Elmo, and other muppets performing the song "Everybody Be Yo'self". The album includes an original arrangement of "America the Beautiful", which he performed years later on the 2006 series finale of The West Wing, "Tomorrow", in which he appears as himself to perform the song at the inauguration of President Matt Santos.

In 2003, Martin Scorsese collaborated with many blues musicians including Keb' Mo' to put together a series of films titled The Blues. Following its release, several albums were released in accordance, some were compilations, some new collaborations and Keb' Mo' released an album in the series featuring a handful of existing recordings from Keb' Mo' to The Door.

Also in 2003, Moore and Lyle Lovett released a cover of the Bob Seger song "'Til it Shines".

On February 10, 2004, he released Keep It Simple which earned him a third Grammy Award, again in the contemporary blues genre. Later that year, he released his sixth studio album, Peace... Back by Popular Demand.

Moore released Suitcase, on June 13, 2006. His touring band following the release included Reggie McBride on bass, Les Falconer III on drums, Jeff Paris on keyboards, and Clayton Gibb on guitar.

On October 20, 2009, Keb' Mo' released the live album, Live and Mo'.

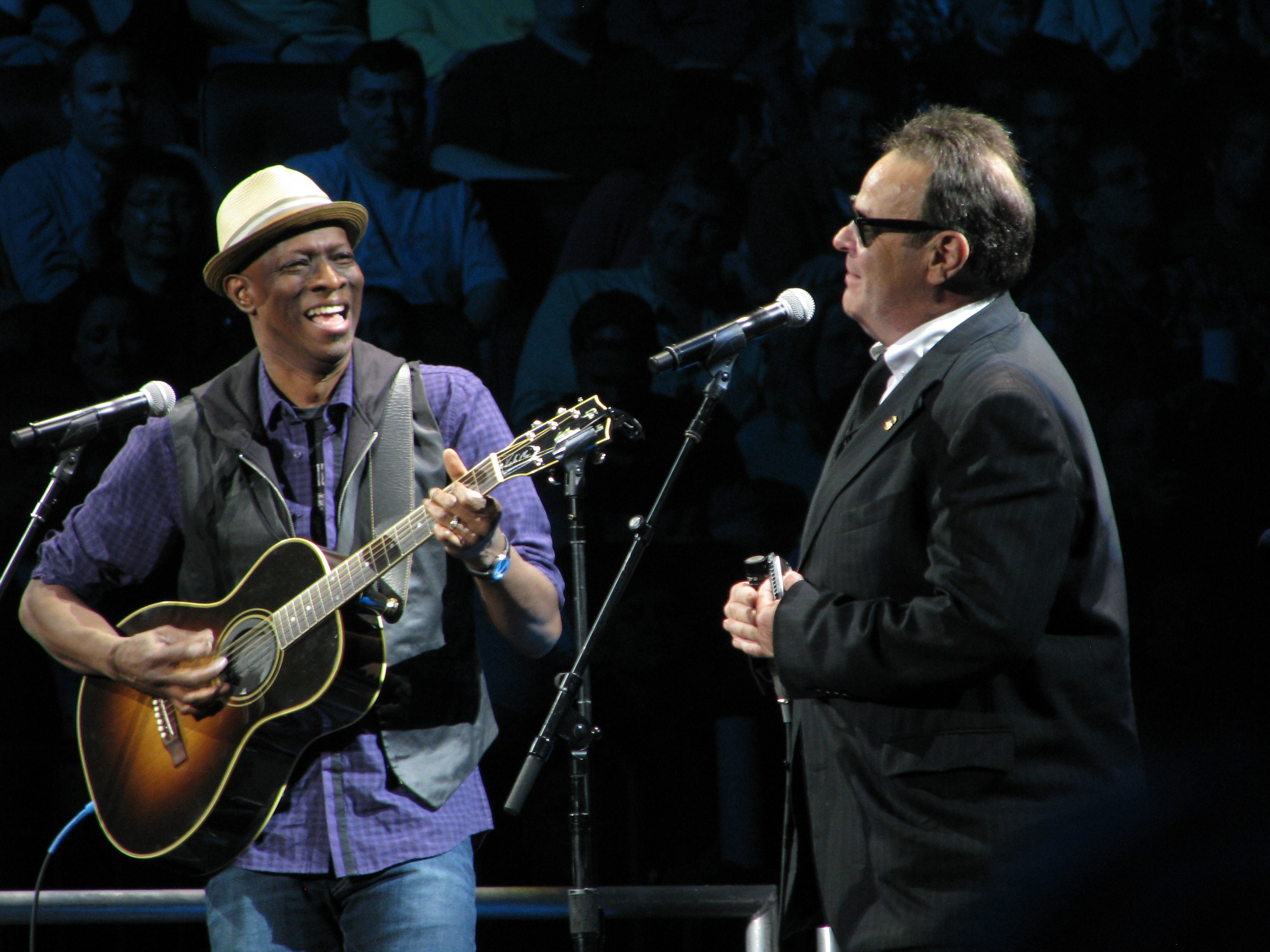
Keb' Mo' performing with Dan Aykroyd at the 2013 Crossroads Guitar Festival, April 12, 2013

At the 2010 Crossroads Guitar Festival, Keb' Mo' performed an acoustic set with Stefan Grossman and an electric set with Vince Gill, Albert Lee, James Burton, Earl Klugh and Sheryl Crow. He joined the finale with most of the day's performers.

On August 2, 2011, Keb' Mo' released The Reflection.

Keb' Mo' performed at a White House event titled "In Performance at the White House: Red, White and Blues" on February 21, 2012. On February 24, 2012, many of the same performers, including Keb' Mo, Gary Clark Jr., Buddy Guy, Warren Haynes, Susan Tedeschi and Derek Trucks, paid tribute to Hubert Sumlin at the "Howlin' For Hubert" memorial concert at the Apollo Theater in New York City.

On the first night of the 2013 Crossroads Guitar Festival, Keb' Mo' performed a set with Booker T. Jones, Steve Cropper, Blake Mills and Matt "Guitar" Murphy. Keb' Mo' later performed two songs with emcee Dan Aykroyd. On the second night of the festival, Keb' Mo' performed with Taj Mahal.

In early 2014, he was nominated for three Grammy Awards for Best Americana Album (BLUESAmericana), Best American Roots Performance ("The Old Me Better") and Best Engineered Album Non-Classical (BLUESAmericana). In May, he appeared alongside Metallica at MusicCare' 10th Annual MAP Fund Benefit Concert at Nokia honoring Ozzy Osbourne and Jeff Greenberg. In October 2014 he honored The Everly Brothers at the Rock and Roll Hall of Fame's 19th annual Music Masters Series, and in November he honored Mavis Staples alongside Bonnie Raitt, Gregg Allman, Taj Mahal, and Grace Potter at Chicago's Auditorium Theatre for celebration of Staples' life and career in honor of her 75th birthday. Also in late 2014 he was featured on a Jackson Browne tribute album, Looking into You: A Tribute to Jackson Browne.

In 2015, his album BLUESAmericana won the 'Contemporary Blues Album' category at the Blues Music Awards.

He has been supportive of charity Playing For Change since its inception and recently appeared in a video with Keith Richards' singing Bob Marley's "Get Up, Stand Up". He appeared on two tracks from the Playing For Change: Songs Around The World that was released on June 17, 2015. The album had over 180 musicians from 31 countries, including Keith Richards, Sara Bareilles, David Hidalgo, Cesar Rosas, and Taj Mahal. He donates 5% of BLUESAmericana to the charity.

In late 2015, he performed at a special concert hosted by Barack Obama called "A Celebration of American Creativity: In Performance at the White House". It was shot and filmed in the East Room of the White House. Other performers included Smokey Robinson, James Taylor, Buddy Guy, Queen Latifah, Usher, Trombone Shorty, MC Lyte, Audra McDonald, Esperanza Spalding, Brian Stokes Mitchell, and Carol Burnett. It commemorated the 50th anniversary of the founding of Lyndon B. Johnson's National Foundation on the Arts through the Humanities Act.

Keb' Mo' released a live album, Keb' Mo' Live – That Hot Pink Blues Album on April 15, on Kind of Blue Music/RED Distribution.

Keb' Mo' partnered up with Taj Mahal to release a joint album, TajMo, on May 5, 2017. The album has guest appearances by Bonnie Raitt, Joe Walsh, Sheila E., and Lizz Wright, and has six original compositions and five covers from artists and bands including John Mayer and The Who. The album won the 2018 Grammy for Best Contemporary Blues Album.

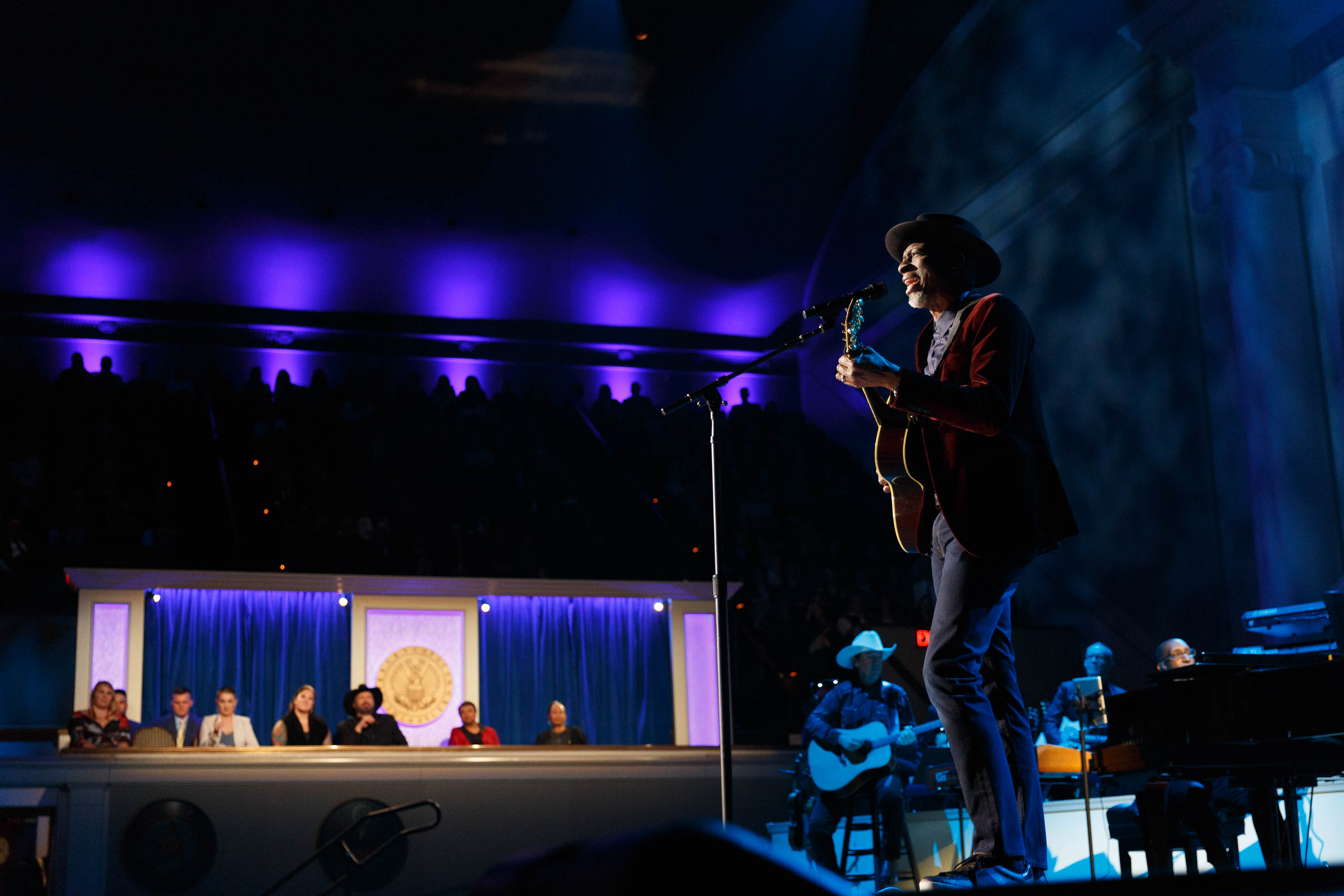
Keb' Mo' performs in 2020.

In June 2019, Keb' Mo' released a studio album, Oklahoma, with guest contributions from Rosanne Cash, Jaci Velasquez, Robert Randolph, and Taj Mahal, with a duet with Robbie Brooks Moore (his wife).

Keb' Mo' played the Glastonbury Festival in June 2019 followed by UK and European dates in July 2019.

Keb' Mo' performed at the 2019 Musicians Hall of Fame and Museum concert and induction ceremony.

Keb' Mo' won the Grammy Award for "Best Americana Album" in 2020 for Oklahoma. He was one of the headliners at the 2020 Mahindra Blues Festival in Mumbai, India.

In late 2024, he toured with Slash, and Keb' Mo's extreme shortage of breath was diagnosed as a leaking heart valve and aortic aneurysm. Open heart surgery followed and a long recuperation ensued. This coupled with a pending divorce from his wife after almost 20 years of marriage, led to a period of introspective reflection. During that time Keb' Mo' recorded the tracks for The Breakdown, which was released in August 2026.

=== Film projects ===
In 1998, he portrayed Robert Johnson in a documentary film, Can't You Hear the Wind Howl?

In 1997, Keb' Mo' portrayed the character Isaac, the Angel of Music in the episode "Inherit the Wind" and again in 1999 in "Then Sings My Soul" of the television series Touched by an Angel. He performed "Hand It Over" from his 1996 release Just Like You in the 1997 episode and again in the 2002 episode "Remembering Me: Part 2". He also appeared as J. D. Winslow in the 2001 episode "Shallow Water", in which he performed his song "God Trying to Get Your Attention" from his album Slow Down.

The 2003 movie Holes features a re-recorded rendition of Just Like You with slightly altered lyrics.

In January 2007, he performed at the Sundance Film Festival.

He played the role of the mischievous spirit Possum in the 2007 John Sayles movie Honeydripper.

Keb' Mo' provided additional music for Mike and Molly.

He co-wrote the opening music for B Positive with executive producer Chuck Lorre.

In 2019, Keb' Mo' was featured as a guest artist on the PBS concert series Bluegrass Underground (now re-branded as The Caverns Sessions).

=== Political activism ===
In 2004, he participated in the politically motivated Vote for Change tour alongside Bonnie Raitt and Jackson Browne, with whom he originally recorded the title track from the album Just Like You.

Keb' Mo' is part of the No Nukes group, which was against the expansion of nuclear power. In 2007, the group recorded a music video of a new version of the Buffalo Springfield song "For What It's Worth".

== Equipment ==
Keb' Mo' uses several types of guitars, including electric guitars, acoustic guitars and resonator guitars. He has a preference for red guitars, as he says on his website: "I have a history with red guitars. My first electric was a red guitar." He mostly plays on a red custom Fender Stratocaster that features two single-coil pickups, and one humbucker and is much modified from a regular Stratocaster model. On stage, he prefers a red Hamer guitar with Gibson P-100 pickups. Two of his electric guitars were lost in the 2010 Nashville flood: an Epiphone Sheraton and a Danelectro Selectomatic.

He owns a variety of acoustic and resonator guitars, including a Gibson artist model, a guitar made for him by James Goodall, a National Style N, a National Resorocket, and a Gibson ES-335-shaped resonator guitar with a P-90 pickup that he purchased in a Nashville club and had repaired.

== Discography ==
=== Albums ===
Released	Album	Peak chart positions						Notes
Released	Album	US	US Blues	AUS	GER	NZ	SWI	Notes
September 9, 1980	Rainmaker	—	—	—	—	—	—	Released under the name "Kevin Moore"
June 7, 1994	Keb' Mo'	—	4	88	—	—	—	Debut album as "Keb' Mo'" Won W.C. Handy Award for Best Country/Acoustic Blues Album of the Year, 1995
June 18, 1996	Just Like You	197	2	97	78	14	39	Won Grammy Award for Best Contemporary Blues Album, 1997
August 25, 1998	Slow Down	109	1	89	38	6	35	Won Grammy Award for Best Contemporary Blues Album, 1999
October 10, 2000	The Door	122	2	—	—	50	—	Nominated Grammy Award for Best Contemporary Blues Album
December 4, 2000	Sessions at West 54th: Recorded Live in New York	—	—	—	—	—	—	Recorded in 1997
June 5, 2001	Big Wide Grin	199	—	—	—	—	—	Nominated Grammy Award for Best Musical Album for Children
September 19, 2003	Martin Scorsese Presents the Blues: Keb' Mo'	—	5	—	—	—	—	Part of the series, The Blues
February 10, 2004	Keep It Simple	149	1	—	—	—	93	Won Grammy Award for Best Contemporary Blues Album, 2005
September 21, 2004	Peace... Back by Popular Demand	174	1	—	—	—	—	
June 13, 2006	Suitcase	176	1	—	—	—	—	Nominated Grammy Award for Best Contemporary Blues Album, and No. 1 on the US Blues Album for 22 weeks
October 20, 2009	Live and Mo'	—	12	—	—	—	—	Six live performances and 4 new studio recordings
August 2, 2011	The Reflection	81	2	—	—	—	—	Nominated Grammy Award for Best Blues Album, 2012
April 22, 2014	BLUESAmericana	58	1	—	—	—	—	Nominated Grammy Award for Best Americana Album, 2014
April 15, 2016	Keb' Mo' Live – That Hot Pink Blues Album	—	3	—	—	—	—	
May 5, 2017	TajMo	80	1	—	—	—	17	Collaboration album with Taj Mahal, won Best Contemporary Blues Album Grammy 2017.
June 14, 2019	Oklahoma	—	2	—	—	—	41	Won the Grammy Award for Best Americana Album at the 62nd Grammy Awards.
October 18, 2019	Moonlight, Mistletoe & You	—	1	—	—	—	—	Peaked No. 1 on the US Blues Albums (Billboard)
January 21, 2022	Good to Be...	—	1	—	64	—	28	Nominated Grammy Award for Best Americana Album, 2023
May 23, 2025	Room on the Porch	—	2	—	—	—	—	Collaboration album with Taj Mahal
August 21, 2026	The Breakdown	—	5	—	—	—	31	

=== DVDs ===
- Sessions at West 54th – Recorded Live in New York (1997)
- Exploring the Guitar with Keb' Mo' (2000)
- The Blues Guitar of Keb' Mo'' (2002)
- Keb' Mo' & Guests (2011)

=== Other contributions ===
In 1998, Moore appeared on the album Begegnungen (the German word for "Encounters") by Peter Maffay, one of the most successful rockstars in Germany and Mid-Europe (16 Number 1 albums in the German album charts). This record is a duet album with artists from every continent. Moore and Maffay make a new version of "Am I wrong".

In 2001, Moore performed "I'm So Lonesome I Could Cry" on the tribute album Timeless: Hank Williams Tribute. Moore is also credited as producer on the Best Country Album, Grammy Award winner for 2001.

In 2002, Moore contributed "Sonnet 35" to the compilation album, When Love Speaks (EMI Classics), which features famous actors and musicians interpreting Shakespearean sonnets and play excerpts. Two years later, he appeared on Amy Grant: Greatest Hits 1986–2004 in a duet entitled "Come Be with Me", which became a modest success on pop radio.

In 2005, Moore appeared on Buddy Guy's version of "Ain't No Sunshine", along with Moore composed one of the theme songs featured on the show, Martha Stewart Living. That same year, he appeared on Eric Clapton's album Back Home.

In 2006, Moore co-wrote the song, "I Hope", with the Dixie Chicks for their album, Taking the Long Way.

In 2006, Moore collaborated with New Orleans blues group The Subdudes, producing their most critically noteworthy album Behind the Levee, penning one cut, "Social Aid and Pleasure Club", and providing backing tracks for several other songs on the album.

In 2006, Moore appeared on the final episode of West Wing, performing "America the Beautiful" at the presidential inauguration.

Moore also provided vocals to Marcus Miller's 2007 album, Free on the track entitled "Milky Way" and again on Miller's 2008 album entitled, Marcus.

In 2008, he also appeared on Otis Taylor's album Recapturing the Banjo, contributing vocals and banjo on several songs.

Moore appeared on the June 7, 2008, broadcast of Garrison Keillor's radio program A Prairie Home Companion. He performed two songs with Bonnie Raitt: "No Getting Over You" and "There Ain't Nothin' in Ramblin'". The show was archived on the A Prairie Home Companion website.

In 2009, Moore co-wrote a song with Peach titled "It Meant Nothing". The song is yet to be released as an official audio recording, however, Peach does perform it and video recordings of live performances exist online.

Moore covered Lowen & Navarro's "If You Loved Me Like That" on Keep the Light Alive : Celebrating the Music of Lowen & Navarro. The proceeds of the album benefited The Eric Lowen Trust, ALS Association Greater Los Angeles, and Augie's Quest.

Moore sings the opening theme ("I See Love", which he co-wrote with Josh Kelley) to the CBS sitcom Mike & Molly.

Moore appeared and played as a backing musician on an episode of Memphis Beat in 2011.

Moore produced and co-wrote the song "Diggin' in the Deep Blue Sea" on the 2011 David Bromberg album Use Me. He also plays electric guitar on the track.

In 2013, Moore appears on B.J. Thomas' The Living Room Sessions, in a duet with Thomas on the single "Most of All".

In 2017, he covered "Lord, I Hope This Day Is Good" for the Don Williams tribute album Gentle Giants: The Songs of Don Williams.

In 2017, he appeared in Signed, Sealed, Delivered: Higher Ground (Hallmark Mystery Movie series) as the character Gabe, and performed several songs. His music was also in the following movies in the series, scheduled to appear again in Signed, Sealed, Delivered: To the Altar on July 15, 2018.

== Awards and nominations ==
=== Grammy Awards ===
Grammy Awards
Year	Nominee/work	Award	Result
1996	Just like You	Best Contemporary Blues Album	Won
1998	Slow Down	Best Contemporary Blues Album	Won
2001	The Door	Best Contemporary Blues Album	Nominated
2001	"Big Wide Grin"	Best Musical Album for Children	Nominated
2004	Keep It Simple	Best Contemporary Blues Album	Won
2005	"I Hope"	Best Country Song	Nominated
2006	Suitcase	Best Contemporary Blues Album	Nominated
2011	The Reflection	Best Blues Album	Nominated
2014	BLUESAmericana	Best Americana Album	Nominated
2014	"Old Me Better"	Best American Roots Song	Nominated
2017	TajMo (with Taj Mahal)	Best Contemporary Blues Album	Won
2020	Oklahoma	Best Americana Album	Won
