= Gold (Jefferson Starship album) =

Compilation album by Jefferson Starship
- Released: January 22, 1979
- Genre: Rock
- Length: 55:22
- Label: Grunt
- Producers: Larry Cox, Jefferson Starship

Jefferson Starship chronology
Earth (1978)	Gold (1979)	Freedom at Point Zero (1979)

Professional ratings
Review scores
Source	Rating
AllMusic	4/5 stars
Christgau's Record Guide	B−

Gold is a compilation album by American rock band Jefferson Starship, released on Grunt Records in 1979. It collects the band's four Top 40 hit singles from the 1970s, as well as three additional singles that charted on the Billboard Hot 100, a single that missed the chart, one b-side, and one album track. All tracks were also featured on their four studio albums to date: Dragon Fly from 1974; Red Octopus from 1975; Spitfire from 1976; and Earth from 1978. It peaked at No. 20 on the Billboard 200, and has been certified a gold record by the RIAA.

The original vinyl album comprised either album or single versions of individual tracks; for instance, the versions of "Miracles," "Love Too Good" and "Runaway" were the single versions and not the album versions. Early pressings of the album on compact disc repeated this, but a 1998 reissue included the full album tracks from Red Octopus and Earth. The original record release also contained a 7-inch 45 RPM bonus single, "Light the Sky on Fire," that was recorded for the Star Wars Holiday Special. That and its b-side, "Hyperdrive" from Dragon Fly, were included on tapes and CDs as tracks six and twelve. The album was re-released on gatefold vinyl on Record Store Day, April 13, 2019, with 5,500 copies. The album is on gold vinyl and contains the mixes from the original vinyl, including the single edits of "Miracles," "Love Too Good," and "Runaway." Like the original, the release includes a 7" 45 RPM vinyl of "Light the Sky on Fire" b/w "Hyperdrive."

== Track listing ==
Side one
No.	Title	Writer(s)	Single issue	Length
1.	"Ride the Tiger" (from Dragon Fly)	Byong Yu, Grace Slick, Paul Kantner	Grunt FB-10080 Billboard: #84	5:06
2.	"Caroline" (from Dragon Fly)	Marty Balin, Paul Kantner	Grunt FB-10206	7:27
3.	"Play on Love" (from Red Octopus)	Grace Slick, Pete Sears	Grunt FB-10456 Billboard: #49	3:12
4.	"Miracles" (from Red Octopus)	Marty Balin	Grunt FB-10367 Billboard: #3	3:25
5.	"Fast Buck Freddie" (from Red Octopus)	Grace Slick, Craig Chaquico		3:23

Bonus single, side one
No.	Title	Writer(s)	Single issue	Length
6.	"Light the Sky on Fire" (original version featured in the Star Wars Holiday Special)	Craig Chaquico	Grunt FB-11426 Billboard: #66	3:56

Side two
No.	Title	Writer(s)	Single issue	Length
7.	"With Your Love" (from Spitfire)	Marty Balin, Joey Covington, Vic Smith	Grunt FB-10746 Billboard: #12	3:33
8.	"St. Charles" (from Spitfire)	Kantner, Balin, Jesse Barish, Chaquico, Thunderhawk	Grunt FB-10791 Billboard: #64	6:38
9.	"Count on Me" (from Earth)	Jesse Barish	Grunt FB-11196 Billboard: #8	3:14
10.	"Love Too Good" (from Earth)	Gabriel Robles, Craig Chaquico	Grunt FB-11374b	4:37
11.	"Runaway" (from Earth)	N. Q. Dewey	Grunt FB-11274 Billboard: #12	3:40

Bonus single, side two
No.	Title	Writer(s)	Single issue	Length
12.	"Hyperdrive" (from Dragon Fly)	Grace Slick, Pete Sears	Grunt FB-11426b	6:11

== Personnel ==
- Paul Kantner – vocals, rhythm guitar
- Grace Slick – vocals
- Marty Balin – vocals all tracks except "Ride the Tiger" and "Hyperdrive"
- David Freiberg – keyboards on "Ride the Tiger," "Caroline," "Miracles," "Light the Sky on Fire," "With Your Love," "St. Charles," and "Runaway"; bass on "Play on Love," "Count on Me," and "Love Too Good"; backing vocals
- Craig Chaquico – lead guitar, backing vocals
- Pete Sears – bass on "Ride the Tiger," "Caroline," "Miracles," "Fast Buck Freddie," "Light the Sky on Fire," "With Your Love," "St. Charles," "Runaway," and "Hyperdrive"; keyboards on "Caroline," "Miracles," "St. Charles," "Love Too Good," "Count on Me," and "Hyperdrive"
- John Barbata – drums, percussion, backing vocals
- Papa John Creach – electric violin on "Ride the Tiger," "Play on Love," "Fast Buck Freddie," and "Hyperdrive"
- Steven Schuster – clarinet on "Light the Sky on Fire"

=== Production ===
- Jefferson Starship – producer
- Larry Cox – producer
- Pat Ieraci (Maurice) – production coordinator
- John Golden – mastering at Kendun Recorders, Burbank
- Tim Bryant / Gribbitt! – art direction
- Tim Bryant, George Corsillo / Gribbitt! – album design
- Annie Leibovitz – photography

== Charts ==
Chart (1979)	Peak position
Canada Top Albums/CDs (RPM)	53
US Billboard 200	20

== Certifications ==
Region	Certification	Certified units/sales
United States (RIAA)	Gold	500,000^{^}
^{^} Shipments figures based on certification alone.
