= Balince =

Compilation album by Marty Balin
- Released: 1990
- Genre: Rock
- Length: 58:43
- Label: Rhino

Marty Balin chronology
There's No Shoulder (1983)	Balince (1990)	Better Generation (1991)

Professional ratings
Review scores
Source	Rating
AllMusic	4/5 stars

Balince is a compilation album of Marty Balin's work, including work from his solo albums and also including tracks from Jefferson Airplane, Jefferson Starship, and KBC Band. The album also includes unreleased tracks from the KBC Band sessions. The album was released shortly after the Jefferson Airplane reunion album and tour.

== Track listing ==
1. "Today" (Marty Balin, Paul Kantner) (from Surrealistic Pillow) – 3:02
2. "Miracles" (Balin) (from Red Octopus) – 6:55
3. "Hearts" (Jesse Barish) (from Balin) – 4:18
4. "Atlanta Lady" (Barish) (from Balin) – 3:29
5. "Do It for Love" (Barish) (from Lucky) – 3:13
6. "What Love Is" (Greg Prestopino, Brock Walsh) (from Lucky) – 4:46
7. "There's No Shoulder" (Jimmy Compton, K. Matsuo) (from There's No Shoulder) – 4:42
8. "Hold Me" (David Evan, Gene Heart) (from KBC Band) – 6:00
9. "Sayonara" (Kazumasa Oda) (from KBC Band) – 5:02
10. "Camellia" (Evan, Heart) (previously unreleased) – 3:45
11. "Valeria" (Kincaid Miller) (previously unreleased) – 3:56
12. "Candles" (Darrel Verdusco, Slick Aguilar, Tim Gorman) (previously unreleased) – 4:28
13. "What's New in Your World" (Robin Sylvester) (previously unreleased) – 3:46
14. "What About Love?" (Miller) (previously unreleased) – 4:42
