= Marty Balin Greatest Hits =

Greatest Hits

Studio album by Marty Balin
- Released: 1999
- Recorded: 1998–1999
- Genre: Rock
- Length: 1:27:53
- Label: Trove Records
- Producer: Rich Landers

Marty Balin chronology
Freedom Flight (1997)	Greatest Hits (1999)

Professional ratings
Review scores
Source	Rating
AllMusic	3.5/5 stars

Marty Balin Greatest Hits is Marty Balin's 1999 album. The first half of the album contains all-new recordings of songs that Marty had previously performed with Jefferson Airplane, Jefferson Starship, KBC Band, and during his solo career. The second half of the album contains interviews with Balin about various subjects.

== Track listing ==
1. "When Love Comes" (Gene Heart, David Evan) – 4:05
2. "Miracles" (Marty Balin) – 6:56
3. "Atlanta Lady" (Jesse Barish) – 3:21
4. "Plastic Fantastic Lover" (Balin) – 3:44
5. "Until You" (Richard Landers) – 3:51
6. "Count on Me" (Barish) – 3:15
7. "Today" (Balin, Paul Kantner) – 3:03
8. "My Heart Picked You" (Landers) – 2:49
9. "Hearts" (Barish) – 4:17
10. "What Love Is" (Greg Prestopino, Brock Walsh) – 4:16
11. "Runaway" (Nicholas Q. Dewey) – 3:55
12. "Beautiful Girl" (Gale Landers, Landers) – 2:55
13. "Summer of Love" (Balin) – 3:47
14. "With Your Love" (Balin, Joey Covington, Vic Smith) – 3:35
15. "Comin' Back to Me" (Balin) – 5:05
16. "Volunteers" (Balin, Kantner) – 3:27
- Interviews
1. Jefferson Airplane - The Beginning
2. Janis Joplin - The Queen
3. Jim Morrison - The Poet
4. Jerry Garcia - The Deadhead
5. Jimi Hendrix - The Experience
6. Paul McCartney - The Pinnacle

== Personnel ==
- Marty Balin - vocals
- Slick Aguilar - guitar
- Vern Vennard - guitar
- Brian Barrele - keyboards
- Dave Burns - trumpet
- Al Caldwell - bass
- Richard Bassil - bass
- Jimmy Carter - bass
- Don Drewitt - drums
- Shannon Forest - drums
- Mark Huth - saxophone
- Dirk Johnson - keyboards
- Bill Lawton - guitar
- Mark Maher - keyboards
- Phil Minardi - sequencing, keyboards
- Andy O'Conner - drums
- Pete Ruthenburg - keyboards
- Michael Severs - guitar
- Spud Taylor - guitar
- Zak Perry - guitar
- Patti Flannigan, Nannette Britt, Summer Pen'et, Liz Lawton, Kelli Bruce, Vickie Carrico – background vocals
