= Earth (Jefferson Starship album) =

Studio album by Jefferson Starship
- Released: February 27, 1978
- Recorded: July – October, 1977
- Studios: Wally Heider, San Francisco
- Genre: Rock
- Length: 41:27
- Label: Grunt
- Producers: Larry Cox; Jefferson Starship

Jefferson Starship chronology
Spitfire (1976)	Earth (1978)	Gold (1979)

Singles from Earth
- 1. "Count On Me" Released: February 1978; 2. "Runaway" Released: May 1978; 3. "Crazy Feelin'" Released: August 1978

Earth is the fourth album by American rock band Jefferson Starship, released in February 1978, by Grunt Records. Recorded in 1977, it features the same lineup as the band's previous album, Spitfire. The album was supported by three singles, all of which charted in the Billboard Hot 100 chart: "Count on Me" (No. 8), "Runaway" (No. 12), and "Crazy Feelin'" (No. 54).

This album marked the end of the band's classic 1970s lineup, as Grace Slick, Marty Balin and John Barbata left following its release and subsequent unsuccessful tour.

== Background ==
The band's previous album Spitfire had been a great success, producing a No. 12 hit in "With Your Love" and going platinum, followed by a successful summer tour. In November 1976 singer Grace Slick married Skip Johnson, the group's former lighting director, which caused some tension in the group since she had previously been with guitarist Paul Kantner for seven years prior, birthing their daughter China Kantner. In addition, singer Marty Balin was hesitant to tour with the group throughout 1977, causing the other band members to blame him for loss of revenue; David Freiberg was quoted in Rolling Stone saying "...we aren’t playing enough. I don’t like to sit at home and have to exercise all the time just to make my hands work."

Balin also gave a contentious interview with Crawdaddy that January in which he stated "The Starship isn't big enough to keep me busy...I refuse to work with imbeciles anymore" and was especially harsh on Slick, claiming "she reminds me of my mother—she's not sexy" and that he was proud that he'd been the only member of Jefferson Airplane who had refused her advances. Balin later claimed his quotes had been taken out of context and to prove no hard feelings, eventually agreed to recording another Starship album in the summer of 1977, with a tour to follow afterward.

== Songs and recording ==
Sessions for Earth were once again held at Wally Heider Studios with Larry Cox producing, like the previous three albums, after a month of band rehearsals in June at Paul Kantner's mansion in the Sea Cliff neighborhood of San Francisco. Sessions at Wally Heider's began on July 14, 1977, with the recording of "Show Yourself" and lasted all the way through October 13 with the recording of "Fire", much longer than it had taken for the prior records. The sessions reportedly went smoothly, but as with Spitfire there was pressure to come up with another platinum release led by a hit single. Although Kantner only co-wrote one track on the album he claimed "that's what the circumstances dictated" and that "working with vocal harmonies is one of my biggest pleasures". By contrast, Balin claimed that he and Slick had the "lousy" job of completing everyone else's ideas with lyrics and melody lines, and expressed interest in a Starship album composed entirely of Balin/Slick duets.

Balin's lead vocal material included the catchy, optimistic pop ballads "Count On Me", "Crazy Feelin'" and "Runaway", the first two written by Jesse Barish and "Runaway" penned by Nicholas Dewey (the brother of an old Marty bandmate from Bodacious DF), plus the rocker "Fire" by Freiberg and Pete Sears with lyrics by Marty himself. Lyrically, the subject of romance that had dominated his music since Red Octopus was still at the forefront. Slick had the most songwriting credits, penning the piano ballad "Take Your Time" with Sears about Balin's perfectionist pace during the making of the album and adding lyrics to Chaquico's "Skateboard", about an accident the guitarist had while filming the movie of the same name (Chaquico was an avid skateboarder, as can be seen in the band's promotional video for "St. Charles"). She also wrote "Show Yourself", a return to the political commentary of the late 60s in the form of an open letter to America in which she demands to know who really runs the country.

Chaquico's opening track "Love Too Good" is a unique fusion of Philadelphia soul, disco, and jazz-fusion with elaborate string and horn arrangements by Gene Page, which closed on lengthy synth and electric piano solos from Sears. The closing number "All Night Long" is a stadium rock anthem composed by the whole band, including Kantner's only songwriting credit, which is also a showcase for Chaquico's guitar expertise. Outtakes from the album mentioned in a summer 1977 Circus article include Marty's "Let's Go" (eventually released on his 1991 solo album Better Generation), Freiberg's "Grow Like A Weed", Kantner's "The Whale Song" (a plea to save the endangered species) and the group number "The Power". During an interview in the Oct-Dec 1978 issue of Dark Star Kantner also mentioned two more outtakes, his "Superman" and the Sears-Balin collaboration "Ecstasy".

== Album cover and title ==
The album's title reflected the final of the four universal elements that had been referenced by the previous three albums. The cover artwork, credited to Tim Bryant and Don Davis, showed a drawing of planet Earth with the group's name and album title printed in Star Wars-style font over a background of stars. The Star Wars association would continue when, shortly after the album's release, the group was contracted to provide the performance of a new song for the Star Wars Holiday Special.

== Release ==
Earth was originally planned for a late August 1977 release date but with the sessions dragging through October and Balin's continual reluctance to tour, it did not arrive until February 27, 1978. According to Rolling Stone, RCA Records, smelling a hit, reportedly spent $500,000 on the album, more than any other Jefferson-related release. On February 25, approximately 400 AM and FM stations aired the album in its entirety for the first time, in what was the most extensive radio promotion in the record company's history. In addition, a merchandising blitz involved retailers receiving posters of the album cover, mobiles, window displays, stickers and streamers. The album was an immediate success, reaching No. 5 on Billboard, shipping gold on release, eventually going platinum and yielding two major hits, "Count On Me" (No. 8) and "Runaway" (No. 12), with "Crazy Feelin'" additionally charting at No. 54.

== Critical reception ==
Professional ratings
Review scores
Source	Rating
AllMusic	2/5 stars
Christgau's Record Guide	C

The album received mixed reviews. Dave Marsh at Rolling Stone noted there were some "fine cuts and expert performances here", singling out "Count On Me" and "Crazy Feelin'", but lamented Paul Kantner's diminished role, concluding "I do think this collection of nine random, albeit tightly knit, songs could have used his peculiar and particular vision." Robert Christgau at Village Voice was typically dismissive, giving the album a "C" and saying only "its expertness conceals neither schlock nor shtick nor strain of ego."

The New York Times also deemed the album "a tired repeat of the new formulas" of the two previous albums. Michael Oldfield in Melody Maker gave another mixed review but concluded that "Love Too Good", "beautifully sung by Grace against Sears' swirling keyboard backing, is an indication of what the Starship are capable of when they put their minds to it". Over in New Zealand, Peter Thompson of Rip It Up opined "My initial reactions to Earth were largely negative. I was going to write about aging rockers who refuse to retire gracefully. But dammit, they do still pack a wallop in their own, somewhat atavistic manner, and besides the tunes have been hanging around my head for days". Billboard gave another positive review, claiming the love ballads were "seamless, beautiful, and perfect for soft rock or MOR play" and that the group had never played better.

Retrospectively, the album received a poor review from AllMusic with Stephen Thomas Erlewine stating that the album "had neither the melodies, hooks or style to make a second rewrite of Red Octopus tolerable" and concluded it was the group's low point of the '70s. Conversely, an article on Rhino's site claims the album is underrated, singling out "Love Too Good" and "Take Your Time" for praise.

== Tour and aftermath ==
A US and European tour followed which was originally to last from May 1978 through late summer and earn the band over a million dollars. The first portion of the tour, through America in May and early June, went relatively well and climaxed with two shows at Nassau Coliseum which were taped for a possible live album. However, when the band next traveled to Europe, disaster struck twice. First, a riot in West Germany occurred after the band decided not to play at the Lorelei Festival near Frankfurt without Slick, who claimed she was ill. The audience ended up burning down the entire venue, including the band's instruments and equipment. Pete Sears claimed "it looked like a bomb had dropped, literally".

The group played one more tense show for Rockpalast in Hamburg with borrowed equipment, which saw a highly inebriated Slick insult the audience by calling them Nazis and giving the Hitler salute. After this show, she was sent home to consider going into rehab and decide if she wanted to stay in the band, but elected not to do the latter. Balin led the band for one more show at the Knebworth Festival in England using rented equipment, but the rest of the shows on the tour were cancelled when the news came back about Slick's departure. After they returned to the US, they filmed their appearance on the Star Wars Holiday Special, after which Marty also decided to leave the group. Finally, drummer John Barbata was forced to exit the band after a serious car accident in October 1978.

This would be the end of the classic 1970s line-up of Jefferson Starship, with several new members joining the band, as well as a new producer, for the next studio album.

== Track listing ==
Side one
No.	Title	Lyrics	Music	Length
1.	"Love Too Good"	Gabriel Robles	Craig Chaquico	6:03
2.	"Count on Me"	Jesse Barish	Barish	3:14
3.	"Take Your Time"	Grace Slick	Pete Sears	4:08
4.	"Crazy Feelin'"	Barish	Barish	3:38
5.	"Skateboard"	Slick; Chaquico	Chaquico	3:18

Side two
No.	Title	Lyrics	Music	Length
1.	"Fire"	Marty Balin; Trish Robbins	David Freiberg; Sears	4:44
2.	"Show Yourself"	Slick	Slick	4:36
3.	"Runaway"	N. Q. Dewey	Dewey	5:18
4.	"All Nite Long"	Paul Kantner; Balin; Barish; Slick	Kantner; John Barbata; Sears; Chaquico; Freiberg	6:28
Total length:				41:27

== Personnel ==
Adapted from the album's liner notes.

Jefferson Starship

- Grace Slick – lead vocals (1, 3, 5, 7), backing vocals, piano
- Marty Balin – lead vocals (2, 4, 6, 8), backing vocals
- Paul Kantner – lead vocals (9), rhythm guitar (1, 4, 5, 7), backing vocals
- Craig Chaquico – lead guitar, rhythm guitar (1, 4, 5, 7), backing vocals
- Pete Sears – bass guitar (5, 8, 9), electric piano (1), organ (1–4, 6, 7), Moog synthesizer (1, 5, 9), piano (2–4, 6, 7), celeste (2), clavinet (4, 6), backing vocals
- John Barbata – electric drums, drums, congas, percussion, backing vocals
- David Freiberg – bass guitar (1–4, 6, 7), organ (5, 8, 9), backing vocals

Additional musicians

- Jesse Barish – backing vocals

Production

- Jefferson Starship – producers, arrangers
- Larry Cox – producer, engineer
- David Frazer – assistant engineer
- Steve Hall – recordist
- Gene Page – strings arrangements, horn arrangements
- John Golden – mastering (at Kendun Recorders, Burbank)
- Pat Ieraci (Maurice) – production coordinator
- Paul Dowell – amp consultant
- Jacky Kangaroo – managerial director

Artwork

- Jefferson Starship – art direction
- Tim Bryant (Gribbitt!) – art director
- Cynthia Bowman; Pat Ieraci – art coordination
- Nat Quick – illustration
- Don Davis – dust sleeve and label illustration (Earth)
- Roger Ressmeyer – photography
- Bill Laudner – art assistant

== Charts ==
Chart (1978)	Peak position
Australian albums (Kent Music Report)	61
Canada Top Albums/CDs (RPM)	4
New Zealand Albums (RMNZ)	29
US Billboard 200	5

== Certifications ==
Region	Certification	Certified units/sales
United States (RIAA)	Platinum	1,000,000^{^}
^{^} Shipments figures based on certification alone.
