= Sweeping Up the Spotlight =

Live album by Jefferson Airplane
- Released: 2007
- Recorded: November 28 & 29, 1969
- Genre: Psychedelic rock
- Length: 73:13
- Label: RCA / Legacy

Jefferson Airplane chronology
At the Family Dog Ballroom (2007)	Sweeping Up the Spotlight (2007)	The Woodstock Experience (2009)

Professional ratings
Review scores
Source	Rating
Allmusic	3/5 stars
The Encyclopedia of Popular Music	3/5 stars

Sweeping Up the Spotlight: Live at the Fillmore East 1969 is the 2007 release of songs from the Jefferson Airplane concerts at New York's Fillmore East, recorded on November 28 & 29 1969. It is also the first American release for the band since 1998, and was assembled by the band's manager, Bill Thompson. It should not be confused with the similarly named Live at the Fillmore East, a recording of a Jefferson Airplane concert given the previous year.

== Track listing ==
No.	Title	Writer(s)	Length
1.	"Volunteers"	Marty Balin, Paul Kantner	3:34
2.	"Good Shepherd" (previously released on Volunteers expanded edition)	traditional, arranged by Jorma Kaukonen	7:15
3.	"Plastic Fantastic Lover" (previously released on Volunteers expanded edition)	Balin	3:16
4.	"Uncle Sam Blues"	traditional, arranged by Kaukonen, Jack Casady	5:07
5.	"3/5 of a Mile in 10 Seconds"	Balin	5:48
6.	"You Wear Your Dresses Too Short"	Syl Johnson, Carl Smith	9:16
7.	"Come Back Baby"	traditional, arranged by Kaukonen	6:47
8.	"Won't You Try / Saturday Afternoon"	Kantner	5:14
9.	"The Ballad of You & Me & Pooneil"	Kantner	10:26
10.	"White Rabbit"	Grace Slick	3:03
11.	"Crown of Creation"	Kantner	3:25
12.	"The Other Side of This Life"	Fred Neil	10:02

== Personnel ==
- Marty Balin – vocals, guitar
- Grace Slick – vocals, piano
- Jorma Kaukonen – lead guitar, vocals
- Paul Kantner – rhythm guitar, vocals
- Jack Casady – bass
- Spencer Dryden – drums
