= Spitfire (Jefferson Starship album) =

- Cover art by Shusei Nagaoka

Studio album by Jefferson Starship
- Released: June 1976
- Recorded: March 1976
- Studios: Wally Heider Studios, San Francisco
- Genres: Arena rock, soft rock, psychedelic rock
- Length: 42:04
- Label: Grunt
- Producers: Larry Cox, Jefferson Starship

Jefferson Starship chronology
Red Octopus (1975)	Spitfire (1976)	Earth (1978)

Spitfire is the third album by American rock band Jefferson Starship. Released in 1976, a year after the chart-topping Red Octopus, it quickly scaled the charts, peaking for six consecutive weeks at No. 3 in Billboard and attaining an RIAA platinum certification. Stereo and quadraphonic mixes of the album were released.

== Background ==
By early 1976, Jefferson Starship had become one of America's biggest rock bands thanks to the multiplatinum success of 1975's Red Octopus and its smash hit "Miracles". They were playing arenas and stadiums as well as headlining big festivals, and money was pouring in. All seemed well within the group, although the beginnings of dissent began to appear when singer Grace Slick broke up her seven-year relationship with guitarist Paul Kantner, choosing to hook up instead with the group's lighting director Skip Johnson (Johnson was quickly fired from that position, although he would be re-hired in 1978). There were also lingering problems with Marty Balin, who had refused to sign a long-term contract with RCA/Grunt and was working on an album-by-album basis, which gave him much leverage now that he was writing the hit singles. Although he was enjoying his return to prominence within the group, the pressure was now on Balin to come up with another hit that would equal or surpass "Miracles".

In the meantime, there were also increasing charges that the group had betrayed their earlier underground credentials as Jefferson Airplane and "sold out" to corporate rock interests. Slick complained that Grunt kept sending her out to silly publicity stunts like cake-judging contests, later reasoning "I was smiling and going along with it because we had to keep the publicity machine oiled while we were waiting for Marty to decide whether or not he was going to go on the road".

== Songs and recording ==
Before going into the studio, the band assembled at their rehearsal space to exchange ideas. As guitarist Craig Chaquico noted, "We would sort of go through all our own song ideas at rehearsals until we found just what we wanted to hear and play together...often Grace would be jotting down new spontaneous incoming lyric inspirations in a yellow legal notebook. We all played what we wanted while riffing off each other live without a real arrangement in mind to follow or anything like a master conductor at first."

Sessions for Spitfire took place from March 4–17, 1976 at Wally Heider Studios with Larry Cox producing, as had been the case for the prior two Jefferson Starship albums. The band's lineup was the same, save for the absence of Papa John Creach who had recently quit the band to concentrate on his solo career. The pressure to produce another blockbuster release led to the group essentially repeating much the same formula as Red Octopus, starting with another "Miracles"-style soft rock ballad from Balin titled "With Your Love" which was co-written with former Airplane drummer Joey Covington and guitarist Vic Smith, who had worked with Marty in Bodacious DF. Balin also sang lead on the opening track "Cruisin'", a funk-rock number by Charles Hickox (another Marty bandmate from Bodacious DF) about cruising down the road which fades out to a Chaquico guitar solo. The album closed with Marty also taking lead vocals on a number by his new writing partner Jesse Barish, the early rock-disco hybrid "Love Lovely Love".

The hard rocker "Dance With The Dragon" originated with a Chaquico guitar riff and initial set of lyrics by him that was later fleshed out by the other band members, in teamwork fashion. Paul Kantner's psych-prog opus "Song For The Sun" was divided into two sections: the opening ambient instrumental "Ozymandias" (credited to all band members except Balin) and the longer "Don't Let It Rain", with lyrics co-credited to Paul and his daughter China. This would be one of the last numbers by the band, both musically and lyrically, to reference '60s countercultural themes. Another centerpiece of the album, "St. Charles", began as the first line of a poem by Thunderhawk, an acquaintance of Balin, with the rest of the lyric completed by Barish, Balin, and Kantner. A power ballad that moves into psychedelic and hard rock territory, it closes on another lengthy Chaquico solo meant to impersonate the heavy storm referenced in the lyrics; it purportedly took six weeks to perfect the vocals on this track. Slick contributed the funky "Hot Water" (co-written with Pete Sears) and soaring, Moog-layered piano ballad "Switchblade", while drummer John Barbata offered the retro-50s rocker "Big City", co-written with ex-Flying Burrito Brother Chris Ethridge. One outtake from the sessions, Freiberg's "Nighthawks" (with lyrics by Robert Hunter), was performed at least once on the supporting tour.

Overall, the album continued the vein of eclectic stylistic variety, with contributions from all band members, that had characterized Red Octopus, along with a polished, highly commercial sound. Chaquico remembers the album's recording as a period when group unity was at an all-time high, although Slick later recalled that Sears wasn't allowed to contribute his longer, more progressive songs to the album.

== Album title and artwork ==
Although Kantner would later claim it was an accident, the titles and artwork of the first four Jefferson Starship albums each reflected one of the four elements: Dragonfly referred to air and Red Octopus referenced water, with Spitfire now evoking fire and the following Earth completing the quartet. Shusei Nagaoka drew the album's cover illustration of a green Chinese dragon holding a white ball of fire in one paw, with a sultry woman named "the dragon princess" riding its torso. Many mistook the woman on the cover to be Grace Slick, but it was model Cassandra Gava, an actress who later appeared in High Road to China.

Professional ratings
Review scores
Source	Rating
AllMusic	3.5/5 stars
Christgau's Record Guide	C
Billboard	(Spotlight)
Rolling Stone	(Very Positive)

== Release and reception ==
Spitfire hit shops in late June 1976, becoming the first Jefferson album (either Airplane or Starship) ever to ship gold on release. It nearly equaled the success of its predecessor, eventually going platinum and charting at No. 3 for six consecutive weeks on Billboard, while reaching No. 1 for one week on Cashbox. It also became the first Jefferson Starship release to chart in the UK, reaching No. 30. The first single, "With Your Love", peaked at No. 12 on Billboard while the follow up "St. Charles" reached No. 64. The group mounted a very successful summer tour to plug it, although there was some disappointment that the album ultimately did not quite equal the sales of Red Octopus, with Kantner later remarking that he had told Balin during the sessions that "With Your Love" did not have the same pull as "Miracles".

Reception to the album was, as usual for the band, mixed. Rolling Stone gave the album a strong review, with Stephen Holden stating the album "mixes the oracular and the mundane with a classical sense of balance. While the music no longer has the explosive urgency of youth, it combines a rare stylistic breadth with awesomely controlled power". He praised every song and each band member's contribution, saving his highest acclaim for "St. Charles", which he called "a transcendently erotic East/West, yin/yang vision of love". Billboard also gave very high marks, calling it a "tremendously impressive followup" to Red Octopus and boasting it did not have a weak cut. By contrast, Robert Christgau of The Village Voice, who had not cared for either of the previous two Starship releases, gave the album a C with the brief comment "They're so vague--they meaning the people, the ideals, and on this album even the textures--that it's hard to tell. Or care." Record World said that the single "St. Charles" "has the kind of haunting melody line that characterized [Jefferson Starship's] recent hits."

Retrospectively, William Ruhlmann at AllMusic gave the album three-and-a-half stars, concluding it "was more than the sum of its parts, boasting the sort of vocal interplay and instrumental virtuosity that had always been the hallmarks of Jefferson Airplane and Jefferson Starship. If the band had taken more time to write and find better songs, it might have matched the sales and quality of its predecessor."

"Song to the Sun" was included in the 1977 Laserock program.

== Track listing ==
Side one
No.	Title	Lyrics	Music	Length
1.	"Cruisin'"	Charles Hickox	Hickox	5:27
2.	"Dance with the Dragon"	Paul Kantner, Grace Slick, Marty Balin, Craig Chaquico	Kantner, Chaquico, Pete Sears	5:02
3.	"Hot Water"	Slick	Sears	3:17
4.	"St. Charles"	Kantner, Balin, Jesse Barish, Chaquico, Thunderhawk	Kantner, Chaquico	6:38

Side two
No.	Title	Lyrics	Music	Length
5.	"Song to the Sun: Part I: Ozymandias / Part II: Don't Let It Rain"	instrumental / Kantner, China Wing Kantner	P. Kantner, Chaquico, John Barbata, David Freiberg, Sears, Slick / P. Kantner	1:39 / 5:36
6.	"With Your Love"	Balin, Joey Covington, Vic Smith	Balin, Covington, Smith	3:33
7.	"Switchblade"	Slick	Slick	4:01
8.	"Big City"	Barbata, Joel Scott Hill, Chris Ethridge	Barbata, Hill, Ethridge	3:20
9.	"Love Lovely Love"	Barish	Barish	3:31

== Personnel ==
- Grace Slick – lead (3, 7) and backing vocals, piano (5, 7)
- Marty Balin – lead (1, 4, 6, 9) and backing vocals
- Paul Kantner – lead (2, 5) and backing vocals, rhythm guitar
- Craig Chaquico – lead guitar, backing vocals
- David Freiberg – keyboards (1–4, 6, 9), ARP synthesizer (5), bass (7, 8), backing vocals
- Pete Sears – bass (1–6, 9), piano (2, 5b), Mellotron (3), keyboards (4, 8), organ (5a, 7), Moog (5a, 7)
- John Barbata – drums, percussion, backing and lead (8) vocals

Additional personnel

- Bobbye Hall – percussion, congas
- Dave Roberts – string and horn arrangements
- Steven Schuster – saxophone (5b)

=== Production ===
- Jefferson Starship – producer, art direction
- Larry Cox – producer, engineer
- Steve Malcolm – assistant to the engineer
- Pat Ieraci (Maurice) – production coordinator
- Bill Thompson – manager
- Cassandra Gaviola – dragon princess
- Paul Dowell – amp consultant
- John Langdon – label art
- Tim Bryant/Gribbit – album design, art direction
- Ron Slenzak – cover photography
- Shusei Nagaoka – illustration
- Recorded and Mixed at Wally Heiders, San Francisco
- Mastered by Kent Duncan, Kendun Recorders, Burbank

== Singles / music videos ==
- "With Your Love" (7/24/76) #12 US
- "St. Charles" (12/4/76) #64 US

== Charts ==
=== Weekly charts ===
Chart (1976)	Peak position
Australian Albums (Kent Music Report)	62
Canada Top Albums/CDs (RPM)	3
Dutch Albums (Album Top 100)	17
New Zealand Albums (RMNZ)	13
UK Albums (Official Charts)	30
US Billboard 200	3
US Cashbox Top 200	1

=== Year-end charts ===
Chart (1976)	Position
Canada Top Albums/CDs (RPM)	21
US Billboard 200	88

== Certifications ==
Region	Certification	Certified units/sales
Canada (Music Canada)	Gold	50,000^{^}
United States (RIAA)	Platinum	1,000,000^{^}
^{^} Shipments figures based on certification alone.
