= At the Family Dog Ballroom =

Live album by Jefferson Airplane
- Released: October 22, 2007
- Recorded: September 9, 1969
- Genre: Psychedelic rock
- Length: 79:00
- Label: Charly/Snapper

Jefferson Airplane chronology
Last Flight (2006)	At the Family Dog Ballroom (2007)	Sweeping Up the Spotlight (2007)

Professional ratings
Review scores
Source	Rating
AllMusic	4/5 stars
The Encyclopedia of Popular Music	2/5 stars

At the Family Dog Ballroom is a recording of a 1969 performance by the San Francisco rock band Jefferson Airplane at the Family Dog Ballroom in San Francisco. Released on CD in the United Kingdom, the album is a digipak offering of material only recently rediscovered. A poster is included.

== Track listing ==
1. "The Ballad of You and Me and Pooneil" (Paul Kantner) – 15:16
2. "Good Shepherd" (traditional, arranged by Jorma Kaukonen) – 6:51
3. "We Can Be Together" (Kantner) – 5:49
4. "Somebody to Love" (Darby Slick) – 3:53
5. "The Farm" (Kantner, Gary Blackman) – 2:55
6. "Crown of Creation" (Kantner) – 3:07
7. "Come Back Baby" (traditional, arranged by Kaukonen) – 5:43
8. "Wooden Ships" (David Crosby, Kantner, Stephen Stills) – 6:10
9. "Volunteers" (Marty Balin, Kantner) – 2:25
10. Jam (Kantner, Kaukonen, Casady, Dryden, Jerry Garcia) – 26:04

== Personnel ==
- Marty Balin – vocals
- Grace Slick – vocals
- Paul Kantner – vocals, rhythm guitar
- Jorma Kaukonen – lead guitar, vocals
- Jack Casady – bass
- Spencer Dryden – drums, percussion
- Jerry Garcia – guitar on "Jam"
