= Aquatarium =

Aquatarium may refer to:

- Aquatarium (Ontario) -- an interactive science museum in Brockville, Ontario, Canada
- Aquatarium (Florida) -- a former amusement park in St. Pete Beach, Florida, USA

== See also ==
- Aquatorium
