= Bobbye Hall =

American percussionist (born 1950)

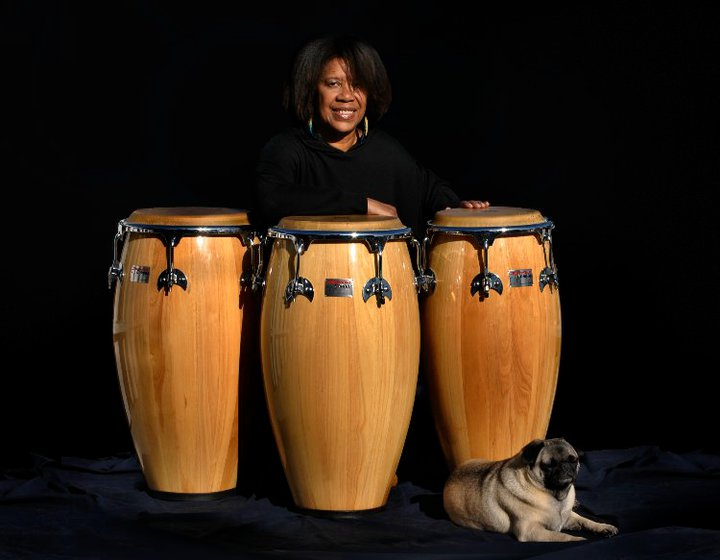
- Hall and her pug, Ching Ching in 2009

Background information
- Born: Bobby Jean Hall; 1950 (age 75–76); Detroit, Michigan
- Genres: Jazz; pop; rock
- Occupation: Musician
- Instrument: Percussion
- Years active: 1963 to present
- Website: https://www.instagram.com/msbobbyehall/

Bobbye Jean Hall is an American percussionist who has recorded with a variety of rock, soul, blues and jazz artists, and has appeared on 20 songs that reached the top ten in the Billboard Hot 100.

== Early career, work for Motown and move to Los Angeles ==
Bobbye Jean Hall was born in Detroit, Michigan, and began her career there playing percussion in nightclubs while still in her teens. While playing at the 20 Grand nightclub in 1961 she was approached by Motown arranger Paul Riser to play on a recording session. Using bongos, congas and other percussion, she played uncredited on many Motown recordings in the 1960s. She lived in Europe for a few years during which time she changed the spelling of her name from Bobby to Bobbye, to distinguish herself as a woman percussionist and as a unique musician. She moved to Los Angeles in 1970 where she was one of the few female session musicians in a male-dominated profession, a sometime associate of the Funk Brothers and the so-called Wrecking Crew. Already a veteran player by May 1971, she was featured on congas in the studio video of the Temptations doing "Sorry Is A Sorry Word", and she added her bongo skills to Marvin Gaye's "Inner City Blues (Make Me Wanna Holler)". Her first studio gig behind a full rock drum kit was with Chris Ethridge on his 1971 album L.A. Getaway—Ethridge said "she was great". She also played on the Gene Clark album, White Light, of the same year.

Hall recorded several albums with Bill Withers, including his No. 1 hit "Lean On Me", and his Live at Carnegie Hall album. She toured with Carole King in May–June 1973 after having participated on two of King's studio albums. During this tour Hall asked King to stop introducing her as "Little Bobbye from Detroit". King suggested "Ms. Bobbye Hall" and from that time forward, Hall was known as Ms. Bobbye Hall. In May 1974, she performed again at Carnegie Hall, this time backing James Taylor, a follow-up to appearing on two of his albums. Stevie Wonder used Hall's percussion skills for a few songs in 1974 and 1976, including "Bird of Beauty" on which her artful quica work established a mood of Brazil at Carnival.

In 1973–1974, Hall began to be credited sometimes as Bobbye Hall Porter, also Bobbye Porter Hall, after her marriage to record producer Joe Porter. Hall released one album of her own in March 1977: Body Language For Lovers, a soul-jazz instrumental work featuring tunes co-written with her husband. Billboard recommended the LP, but it did not chart.

== Global exposure ==
In 1978, Bob Dylan took her on a world tour, from mid-February to mid-December, paying her $2,500 per week—about $12,300 in today's dollars. This handsome compensation was arranged to pay for the studio sessions she would be missing. The men and women appearing on stage with Dylan were required to wear costumes designed in Hollywood by Bill "Spoony" Whitten, and the musicians did not like them. Lead guitarist Billy Cross said "the band looked like a large aggregation of pimps", and backup singer Debi Dye-Gibson said she and the other women "looked like hookers". The show's playlist was a collection of Dylan's greatest hits, as specified by promoters at the tour's Japanese stops. All the songs, even the sparse acoustic ones, were arranged for a full band and a big sound. Hall and the musicians stayed at the best hotels side-by-side with Dylan, and flew on a chartered jet airliner which held suites and a bar.

Hall joined Dylan from time to time at dinner, and was surprised to find him a longtime fan of soul food—she observed him to be "infatuated by going out with black women ...by that whole black thing, [even] eating the food." He entertained her with card tricks. However, the tour began to wear on him, and he called band meetings where he criticized his musicians sharply for being too formulaic. Hall remarked of these encounters, "when he spoke to us, he was not the poet." A two-disc album was produced using 22 songs recorded live in Japan: Bob Dylan at Budokan, and a stop in Santa Monica, California, allowed Dylan and most of the touring band to cut a studio album, Street-Legal, with Hall on percussion.

In late August 1978, in between Dylan tour dates, Hall played congas for Tom Waits's Blue Valentine album, on the track "Romeo Is Bleeding", giving it a gritty Latin feel.

In 1979, she recorded "Run Like Hell" (on The Wall) with Pink Floyd. She recorded with Bob Seger's Silver Bullet Band in the early 1980s. Hall joined Stevie Nicks for her album Bella Donna and toured with her in 1981, 1983, and 1986.

For the 1986 film Little Shop of Horrors, Hall played tambourine and congas on the soundtrack.

Other musicians she has recorded for include Fanny, Kim Carnes, Lynyrd Skynyrd, Janis Joplin, Tavares, Randy Newman, Rod Stewart, Dolly Parton, Mel Brown, Leo Sayer, Cecilio & Kapono, Russ Ballard, Donovan, Joni Mitchell, Jerry Garcia, Patti Scialfa, Freda Payne, Dwight Yoakam, Donald Byrd, Gene Harris, Bobby Hutcherson, Grant Green, Ferron, Poco, the Temptations, Mary Wells, Jefferson Starship, Kenny Rankin, the Manhattan Transfer, Stanley Turrentine, Kyle Vincent, Boz Scaggs, Marc Bolan, Judy Mowatt, Hugo Montenegro, Aretha Franklin, the Doobie Brothers, Kris Kristofferson, Smokey Robinson, Diana Ross, Al Kooper, the Jeff Healey Band, the Doors, Robin Zander, Lone Justice, the Mamas & the Papas, David Byrne, Marty Balin, Sarah Vaughan, Tommy Bolin, Ozark Mountain Daredevils, Harry Chapin and Tracy Chapman.

== Instruments ==
She has recorded as percussionist and drummer using the following instruments: bongos, congas, tambourine, claves, quica, wood block, tabla, full drum kit, tom-toms, cabasa, maracas, cowbell, bells, shaker, güiro, triangle, mark tree, hand claps, finger snaps and finger cymbals.

== Billboard chart appearances ==
These songs recorded with Hall appeared on the Billboard Hot 100 chart:

Artist	Song	Year-month	Highest chart position
Janis Joplin	"Me and Bobby McGee"	1971-00	1
Bill Withers	"Ain't No Sunshine"	1971-00	3
Bill Withers	"Grandma's Hands"	1971-00	42
Marvin Gaye	"Inner City Blues (Make Me Wanna Holler)"	1971-09	9
Carole King	"Sweet Seasons"	1971-12	9
Carole King	"Been to Canaan"	1972-00	24
Bill Withers	"Use Me"	1972-10	2
Joni Mitchell	"You Turn Me On, I'm a Radio"	1972-11	25
Bill Withers	"Lean On Me"	1972-06	1
Tavares	"Check It Out"	1973–00	35
Tavares	"That's the Sound That Lonely Makes"	1973-00	70
Marvin Gaye	"Let's Get It On"	1973-06	1
Seals and Crofts	"Diamond Girl"	1973-08	6
Seals and Crofts	"We May Never Pass This Way (Again)"	1973-10	21
Marvin Gaye	"Come Get to This"	1973-10	21
Marvin Gaye	"You Sure Love to Ball"	1974-01	50
Smokey Robinson	"Virgin Man"	1974-03	56
Smokey Robinson	"It's Her Turn to Live"	1974-03	82
Jefferson Starship	"Miracles"	1975-03	3
The Doobie Brothers	"Take Me in Your Arms (Rock Me a Little While)"	1975-05	11
Lynyrd Skynyrd	"Saturday Night Special"	1975-05	27
Jefferson Starship	"With Your Love"	1976-06	12
Jefferson Starship	"St. Charles"	1976-06	64
Leo Sayer	"How Much Love"	1976-11	17
Dave Mason	"We Just Disagree"	1977-00	12
Rita Coolidge	"(Your Love Keeps Lifting Me) Higher and Higher"	1977-03	2
Diana Ross	"Gettin' Ready for Love"	1977-09	27
Diana Ross	"Your Love Is So Good For Me"	1977-09	49
Diana Ross	"You Got It"	1977–09	49
Leo Sayer	"Thunder in My Heart"	1977-10	38
Leo Sayer	"Easy To Love"	1978-00	36
Quincy Jones	"Roots Medley"	1977-00	57
Rita Coolidge	"We're All Alone"	1977-09	7
Dan Fogelberg	"The Power of Gold"	1978-00	24
Billy Preston	"With You I'm Born Again"	1979-10	4
Pink Floyd	"Run Like Hell"	1980-00	53
Marty Balin	"Hearts"	1981-05	8
Marty Balin	"Atlanta Lady (Something About Your Love)"	1981-05	27
Stevie Nicks	"Leather and Lace"	1981-07	6
Stevie Nicks	"Edge of Seventeen"	1981-07	11
Stevie Nicks	"After the Glitter Fades"	1981-07	32
Bob Seger	"Roll Me Away"	1982-12	5
Bob Seger	"Shame on the Moon"	1983-02	2
Stevie Nicks	"Stand Back"	1983-05	5
Tom Petty and the Heartbreakers	"Don't Come Around Here No More"	1985-05	13
Tom Petty and the Heartbreakers	"Rebels"	1985-05	74
Rod Stewart	"Lost In You"	1988-05	12
Rod Stewart	"Forever Young"	1988-05	12
Rod Stewart	"My Heart Can't Tell You No"	1988-05	4
Rod Stewart	"Crazy About Her"	1989-00	11
Jeff Healey	"Angel Eyes"	1989-06	5
Tracy Chapman	"Crossroads"	1989-10	90
