= Bodacious DF =

Studio album by Bodacious DF
- Released: October 1973
- Recorded: 1973 at Record Plant, Sausalito
- Label: RCA Records
- Producer: Billy Wolf; Doc Storch; Bodacious DF

Bodacious DF is a 1973 rock album, the only release by the short-lived band of the same name.

After leaving Jefferson Airplane in 1971, founder Marty Balin produced an album by the band Grootna in 1972. He then formed the band Bodacious DF with Grootna members Vic Smith and Greg Dewey (also from Country Joe & the Fish), as well as Mark Ryan (from Quicksilver Messenger Service) and Charlie Hickox.

The band broke up shortly after the album was released; Balin joined Jefferson Starship in 1975, and frequently performed the Bodacious songs "The Witcher" and "Driving Me Crazy". Hickox and Smith collaborated with him on songs for Jefferson Starship's album Spitfire (1976), and Greg Dewey's brother Nicholas Dewey wrote a song for Earth (1978).

== Track listing ==
=== Side one ===
1. "Drifting" (Jesse Osborne) – 4:30
2. "Good Folks" (Lonnie Talbot) – 7:30
3. "The Witcher" (Marty Balin, Vic Smith) – 6:26

=== Side two ===
1. "Roberta" (Balin, Smith, Trish Robbins) – 4:25
2. "Second Hand Information" (Charlie Hickox) – 4:53
3. "Drivin' Me Crazy" (Smith) – 7:06
4. "Twixt Two Worlds" (Balin, Smith) – 5:30

=== Personnel ===
- Marty Balin – lead vocals
- Mark Ryan – bass, background vocals
- Greg Dewey – drums, percussion, background vocals on "Second Hand Information"
- Vic Smith – guitars, background vocals
- Charlie Hickox – keyboards, background vocals on "Second Hand Information"

Additional personnel

- Rhani Kugel, Anna Rizzo, Trish Robbins – background vocals on "Good Folks"
- Boots Hughston – saxophone on "The Witcher"

Production

- Billy Wolf – producer
- Doc Storch – producer, engineer, mixdown
- Bodacious DF – producer, arranger
- Kurt Kinzel – assistant engineer
- Stephen Stone – photography
- North Beach Camera, Luigi Alfano, Jack Wright – photographic assistance
- Bob Fried – artist
- Recorded at Record Plant, Sausalito
- Mastered at Lacquer Channel, Sausalito
