= SVT (band) =

American power pop/new wave band

- Origin: San Francisco, California
- Genres: Power pop, new wave
- Years active: 1978–1983
- Past members: Brian Marnell; Bill Gibson; Jack Casady; Paul Zahl; Nick Buck

SVT was an American power pop / new wave band based in San Francisco in the late 1970s and early 1980s. Their bassist, Jack Casady, had played in both Jefferson Airplane and Hot Tuna. Other members were singer Brian Marnell, drummer Bill Gibson (later of Huey Lewis and the News, replaced by Paul Zahl), and Nick Buck, also a Hot Tuna veteran, on keyboards.

The group is said to have taken its name from the medical condition known as supraventricular tachycardia. Another plausible explanation is that the name was taken from a model of bass guitar amplifier, the Ampeg Super Vacuum Tube.

SVT recorded two singles in 1979, one EP in 1980, and one album, No Regrets, in 1981. They were one of the first bands ever to record on San Francisco's 415 Records, who released their single, "Heart of Stone", in 1979. The group disbanded in 1982 after both Zahl and Casady left to form Yanks with Jack Johnson and Owen Masterson. Casady later quit Yanks and was replaced by bassist Steve Aliment. Brian Marnell died in 1983. Casady's former Jefferson Airplane bandmate Marty Balin covered the song "Heart of Stone" on his album, Lucky in 1983.

== Discography ==
- 1979 Single: "New Year" (live) / "Wanna See You Cry" (live)
- 1979 Single: "Heart Of Stone" / "The Last Word"

== 1980 EP: Extended Play (415 Records) ==
=== Side one ===
1. "Price of Sex" (Brian Marnell) – 2:28
2. "I Can See" (Nick Buck) – 2:59
3. "Red Blue Jeans" (Jack Rhodes, Bill Davis) – 2:05
4. "Always Comes Back" (Marnell) – 3:55

=== Side two ===
1. "I Walk the Line" (Johnny Cash) – 2:13
2. "Modern Living" (Buck) – 2:56
3. "Down at the Beach" (Marnell) – 2:43

=== Personnel ===
- Nick Buck – keyboards, vocals
- Brian Marnell – guitar, vocals
- Paul Zahl – drums, vocals
- Jack Casady – bass

=== Production ===
- SVT – producer
- Stacey Baird – engineer, co-producer
- Recorded at Different Fur Recording, San Francisco
- Chris Coyle, Steven Countryman – management
- Richard Stutting / Artbreakers – album art and design
- Chester Simpson – photography

== 1981 LP: No Regrets (MSI Records) ==
=== Side one ===
All songs by Brian Marnell except where noted

1. "Bleeding Hearts" – 4:51
2. "Waiting for You" – 2:53
3. "Heart of Stone" – 3:00
4. "No Regrets" (Brian Marnell, Suzie Kobrofsky) – 3:23
5. "Money Street" – 5:23

=== Side two ===
1. "Love Blind" – 2:52
2. "North Beach" – 3:07
3. "What I Don't Like" – 3:20
4. "Secret" – 2:44
5. "Too Late" – 5:07
6. "You Don't Rock" – 4:35

=== Personnel ===
- Brian Marnell – vocals, guitars
- Jack Casady – electric bass, Gibson mandobass, bass balalaika
- Paul Zahl – drums, vocals

=== Production ===
- SVT – arrangements, mixer
- Mark Richardson – producer, engineer, mixer
- Recorded at Fantasy Studios, Berkeley, CA
- Eddie Harris, Jaime Bridges, Eddie Ciletti – assistant engineers
- Michael Herbick, Steve Toby, Jesse Osborne – tech engineers
- Mastered at Master Disc, New York City
- Howie Weinberg – mastering engineer
- Vincent Anton – photography
- Suzanne Phister – album cover design, lettering
- Richard Stutting / Artbreakers – SVT logo
- The Walking Zombie – gear
- Steven Countryman – management
