= Johnny Charro =

- Born: Tampa, Florida, United States
- Occupations: Entertainer, singer
- Years active: 1973–present
- Formerly of: The Johnny Charro Review

Johnny Charro is a popular entertainer from the Tampa Bay area and has been performing since the 1970s. He saw Elvis Presley perform live as a child and was inspired by him.

== Background ==
He has been performing with his backup band, covering the genres of rock and roll, Latin music, country, and soul. Charro was born in Tampa and grew up there. When he was 12 years old, he saw Presley perform at the amoury in Tampa. This was an inspiration to him. Years later, Presley's death had an effect on him.

== Career ==
Charro started singing professionally around 1973, starting off in a duo. His agent slotted him in the Elvis, Tom Jones look and sound which attracted a fair amount of female attention. In May 1977, Charro was filmed in Lakeland's Pit and Cart by WLCY-TV with a possibility of approval by the station and its representative, the film would be shown on an affiliate station in St. Petersburg. In April 1979, Charro was appearing at the Coach Paddock Supper Club Lounge. His two-week engagement there had begun on 26 March that year. In November 1978, with his band, The Johnny Charro Review, they were appearing at the Hawaiian Inn's Aloha Lounge with an Elvis-tribute show having appeared since early October that year. Prior to that another Elvis tribute artist, Mr. Fatu was appearing at the lounge.

Karen Deal, the wife of Jefferson Airplane singer Marty Balin, who was in Charro's band in the mid-1970s, died in November 2010. In May 2015, he was appearing at the American Legion Arlington Road Lounge in Tampa.

== The Johnny Charro Review ==
=== Members ===
1978

- Keyboards - Karen Deal
- Bass - Ron Toloday
- Drums - Kevin McNary
- Guitar - Tom Stanley

== In film ==
Charro had a role in the Grindhouse-horror film, Another Son of Sam, filmed in 1975, but unreleased until 1977, and it was directed by Dave A. Adams. He also sang "Never Said Goodbye", which appears in the movie.

The song "Viva Ybor", which he co-wrote with John Centinarro, was featured in the 2007 film Real Premonition.

== Discography ==
- Johnny Charro Sings Just For You - JBJ Records JBJ 001
- When the Lights go Out - Star Records
