= Freedom Flight =

Freedom Flight may refer to:

- Freedom Flight (Marty Balin album), 1997
- Freedom Flight (Shuggie Otis album), 1971
- Freedom Flights US sponsored air-lift part of American resettlement program offering alien resident status to Cuban exiles 1965–1974.
