= The Hawaiian Inn =

Inn in St Petersburg Beach, Florida, U.S.

- Formerly: The Desert Resort
- Industry: Hospitality
- Founder: Frank S. Cannova
- Key people: Frank Cannova, Michael R. Triolo

The Hawaiian Inn was an inn located in St. Petersburg Beach, Florida.

== Background ==
It was located at 6200 Gulf Blvd, St. Petersburg Beach, Florida. The Hawaiian Inn was born in 1974. Prior to that, for the last 18 years, it was known as The Desert Resort. With the new management headed by Frank Cannova, the previous Western theme and name was replaced by a Polynesian-inspired concept. The management corp, Hawaiian Inns of Florida Inc., had Cannova as a major stockholder. Its vice-president and investor was Michael R. Triolo. The umbrella organization of Hawaiian Inns of Florida Inc. was First-America Development Corp., Hollywood, which also owned the Aquatarium.

In November 1978, the inn suffered heavy damage due to a fire. In February 1979, Cannova sold the inn for around $2 million to Resort Inns of America which already owned a number of inns in the area.

== The Kon Tiki Supper Club ==
In 1975, Monday nights would be considered as family nights at the Kon Tiki, and had entertainment aimed at the young guests. There was also a floor show which had Polynesian acts performing native fire-knife dances and dancing hula girls.

One of the Polynesian dancers at the inn would eventually be known as Marina the Fire-Eating Mermaid, a.k.a. MeduSirena.

== The Aloha Lounge ==
The Aloha lounge was located up a curving stairway. Acts would include Elvis impersonator Mr. Fatu, and The Maui Bandsmen. Others would include Lenny Dee. To add, Kuki and his Kandy Kompany would perform there.

=== Acts ===
Erni Benet

In December 1974, Hawaiian born Erni Benet was leading a trio in the Aloha lounge.

Mr. Fatu

During the 1970s, a star attraction at the inn was Samoan Elvis impersonator, Mr. Fatu who was referred to as the greatest Elvis impressionist of the day. His 1976 album, Mr. Fatu Sings Elvis was recorded live at The Hawaiian Inn. In December 1976, following a vacation, he was back ready to perform at the lounge again on the 5th of that month. In August 1977, he was appearing at the Colonial Inn, backed by a nine-piece band called Coastal Connection.

Johnny Charro

In November 1978, Johnny Charro, another singer with an Elvis edge and his backing band, The Johnny Charro Review were appearing at the Aloha Lounge having appeared since early October.

Lenny Dee

In January 1978, Lenny Dee appeared at the Aloha Lounge, appearing Tuesday through to Saturday, 9:30pm and 11:30pm. For a while, Dee held a residency there.

Other acts

One of the other acts to appear there was THE Loris Caines Harmonicon Band.

== Changes ==
In the March 15, 1979 edition of the Gulf Beach Independent an article stated that there would be thematic changes to the inn and one of the changes was the transformation of a Hawaiian styled beach bar to a German style trader beer garden. There were plans for an oom-pah-pah band as well.
