= Frank Cannova =

American businessman

- Born: January 14, 1911; Lodi, New Jersey, U.S.
- Died: November 29, 2005 (aged 94); Bayway Isles, St. Petersburg, Florida, U.S.
- Occupations: Hotelier, business entrepreneur
- Children: Michael (son)
- Parent(s): Francesco Cannova, Catherina Cannova (nee Triolo)

Frank Santo Cannova Jr. (January 14, 1911 – November 29, 2005) was an American hotelier, businessman, and entrepreneur.

== Early life ==
He was born in Lodi, New Jersey to Sicilian parents Francesco and Catherina Cannova. His mother's maiden surname was Triolo.

His father, who came to the United States from Sicily at the age of 9, was a millionaire by the time he was 35 years old. Frank Jr. lived with his family on ten acres of land in New Jersey.

Cannova's father quit his job as a road contractor at his mother's request and moved to Miami. His father, having lost several fortunes including one during the depression was a lesson for Frank Jr., that wealth can be temporary; that it could be present one day, and the next day there would be nothing left.

== Education ==
He dropped out of school to work and help the family. He graduated from Hackensack High School, the University of Miami in 1943 and the University of Miami School of Law.

When he was 35 he went back to college. He then went to law school and at some stage was assistant attorney general of Florida.

== Career ==
He served in the United States Army during the World War II era. In October 1944, he was commissioned as a 2nd lieutenant in the transportation corps while at New Orleans Army Air Base and advanced to the rank of first lieutenant. In 1968, he moved to St. Petersburg from Hollywood, Florida.

== Business ventures ==
=== Aquatarium ===
In 1968, he purchased The Aquatarium for 2 million. Some nine or ten years later, Cannova had a 10 million dollar lawsuit against the city for losses incurred at The Aquatarium after commissioners issued a permit for a water slide then reneged on it.

=== First America Development Corp. ===
By 1963, Cannova was the president of First America Development Corp.

=== The Hawaiian Inn ===
In 1974, the corporation he headed took over The Desert Resort. Changing the theme and name, they turned it into a Polynesian-inspired accommodation called The Hawaiian Inn. He was the director and major shareholder of Hawaiian Inns of Florida Inc. His vice-president was Michael R. Triolo. In January 1975, Cannova had his birthday party held at the Inn with his father, relatives, and friends present.

Cannova's picture and notes appear on the back of Samoan Elvis impersonator, Fatu Lauoletolo, aka Mr. Fatu's album Mr. Fatu Sings Elvis, with the caption, "Mr. Frank Cannova, The who makes the action happen." The album was recorded at The Hawaiian Inn's Aloha Lounge. In February 1979 as a result of a fire, Cannova sold the inn for around 2 million to Resort Inns of America which already owned a number of inns in the area.

=== Bank of St. Petersburg ===
In 1988, he bought into the Bank of St. Petersburg and had controlling interest of the bank. Prior to the purchase, the bank was under the control of Anchor Savings Bank. About two years later, he was filing a lawsuit against Anchor with claims that he had been misled about the financial status of the Bank of St. Petersburg.

=== Death ===
He died on November 29, 2005, at Bayway Isle home at age 94. He was survived by a son, Michael, two grandchildren, and his two sisters, Rose and Sally.
