= John Barbata =

American drummer (1945–2024)

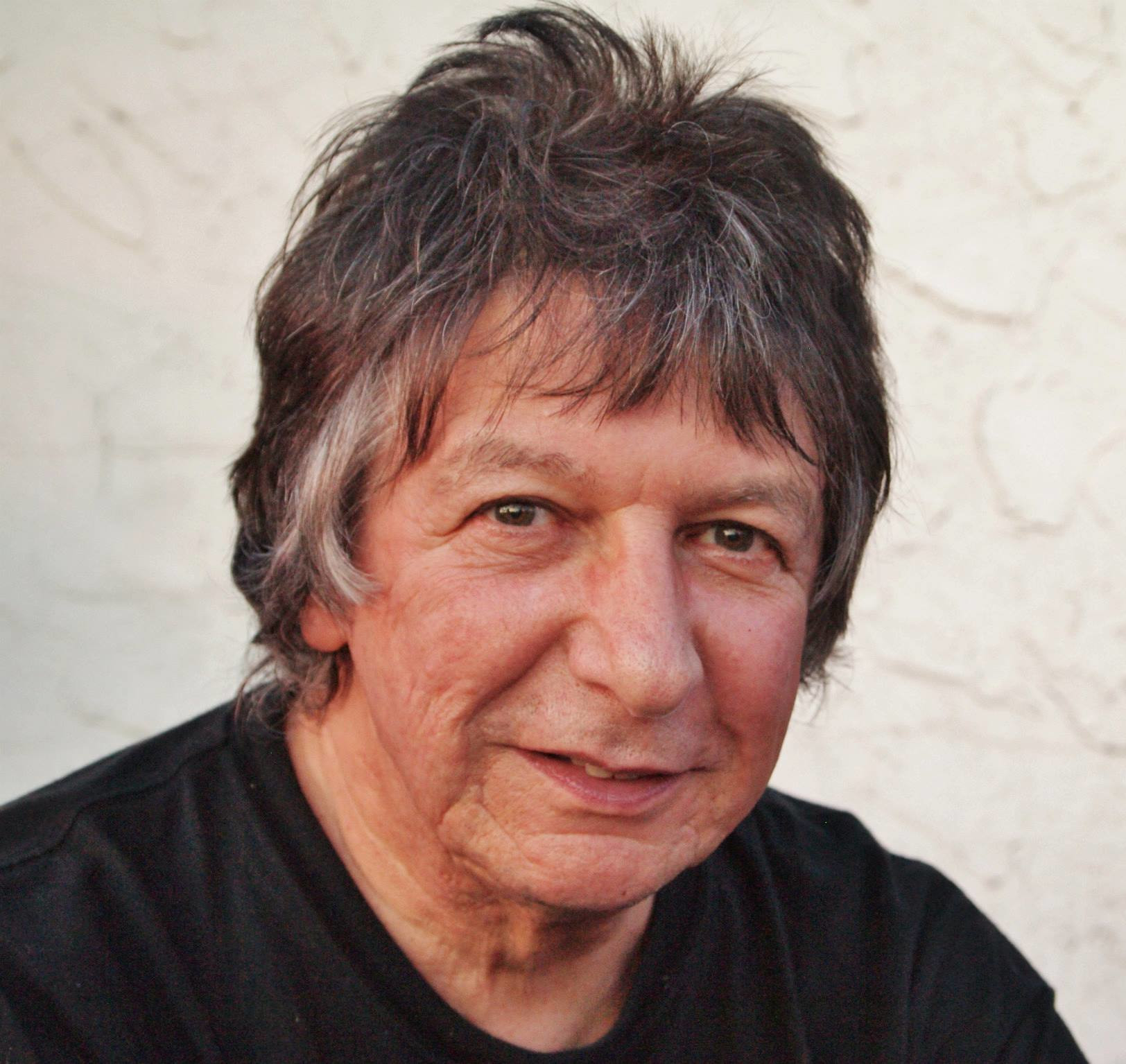
- Barbata in 2014

Background information
- Born: April 1, 1945; Passaic, New Jersey, U.S.
- Died: May 8, 2024 (aged 79) Ada, Oklahoma, U.S.
- Genres: Pop, pop rock, rock and roll
- Occupation: Drummer
- Years active: 1961–2024
- Formerly of: The Sentinals, The Turtles, The Stray Gators, Crosby, Stills, Nash & Young, Jefferson Airplane, Jefferson Starship

John Barbata (April 1, 1945 – May 8, 2024) was an American drummer who was active especially in pop and rock bands in the 1960s and 1970s, both as a band member and as a session drummer. Barbata served as the drummer for The Sentinals, The Turtles, Crosby, Stills, Nash & Young, Jefferson Airplane (for its final album and tour only), and Jefferson Starship (from 1974 to 1978). Barbata claimed to have played on over 60 albums in an uncredited capacity.

== Early life ==
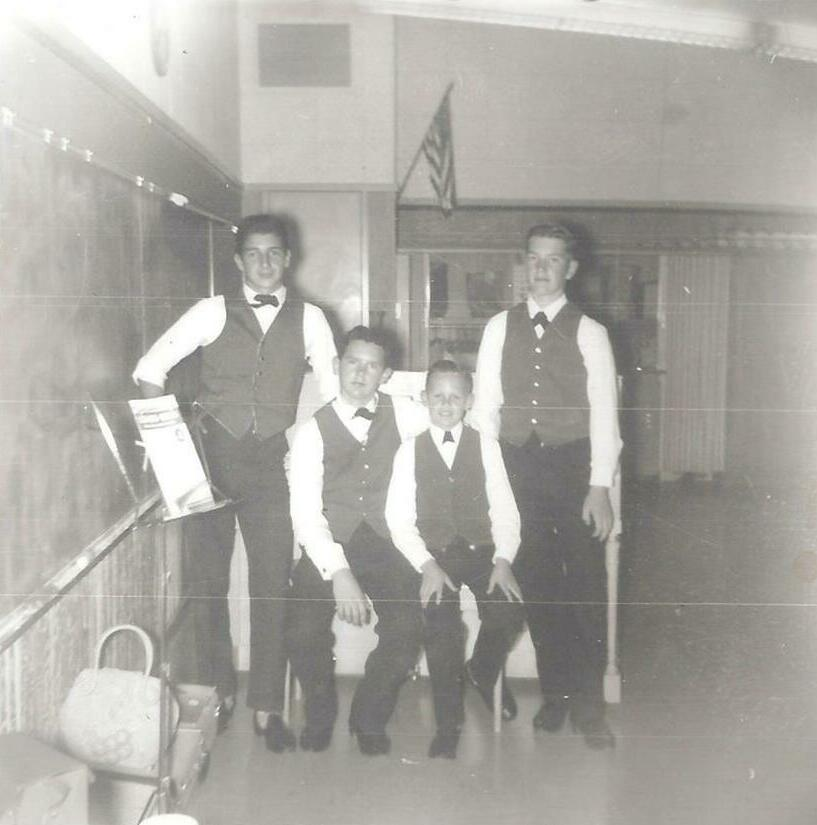
Barbata's 9th-grade band

Barbata was born on Easter, April 1, 1945, in Passaic, New Jersey, to Martina and Charles Barbata. He was raised in Saranac Lake, New York, till the age of seven and later in Nutley, New Jersey. His mother was an Austrian emigrant who worked as a records keeper at a hospital and his father was a firefighter and mechanic. He was the youngest child of three, preceded by his older brother Chuck and sister Lauren. His first claim to fame came to him as a young infant when his mother found a man stranded in a boat that had run out of gas. The man was Albert Einstein, who held the child as Barbata's mother delivered them to shore.

Barbata's interest in percussion began by watching his older brother drum in the marching band. After expressing interest in drums, his brother took him to a friend's house where Barbata played on his first trap set. The first song he ever learned to play was "Put Another Nickel In" by Teresa Brewer.

== The Sentinals (1961–1965) ==
At the age of 16, Barbata's family relocated for a brief stint to Rialto, California, where Barbata formed his first band called the Velvatones. Soon after the family moved to San Luis Obispo, California, where Barbata went to high school and followed in his older brother's footsteps and joined the marching band. The rudimentary rhythms and beats from Barbata's time in drum line heavily influenced his technique in later years. He soon went on to help form a band called the Ambassadors and bought his first set of drums. After playing gigs every weekend for six months, Barbata was approached by an instrumental surf rock group called the Sentinals to play drums. The Sentinals toured all over the country with acts such as The Righteous Brothers and released the album Big Surf! which produced a No. 1 West Coast surf hit called "Latin'ia".

After five years with the Sentinals, the band broke up, and Barbata, along with his bandmate Lee Michaels, headed to Hollywood. Shortly after, Barbata joined Joel Scott Hill of Canned Heat, after his drummer left and went on to play with the Mamas and Papas. Joel, Barbata, and Chris Ethridge later went on to put out the album L.A. Getaway in 1971.

== The Turtles (1966–1969) ==
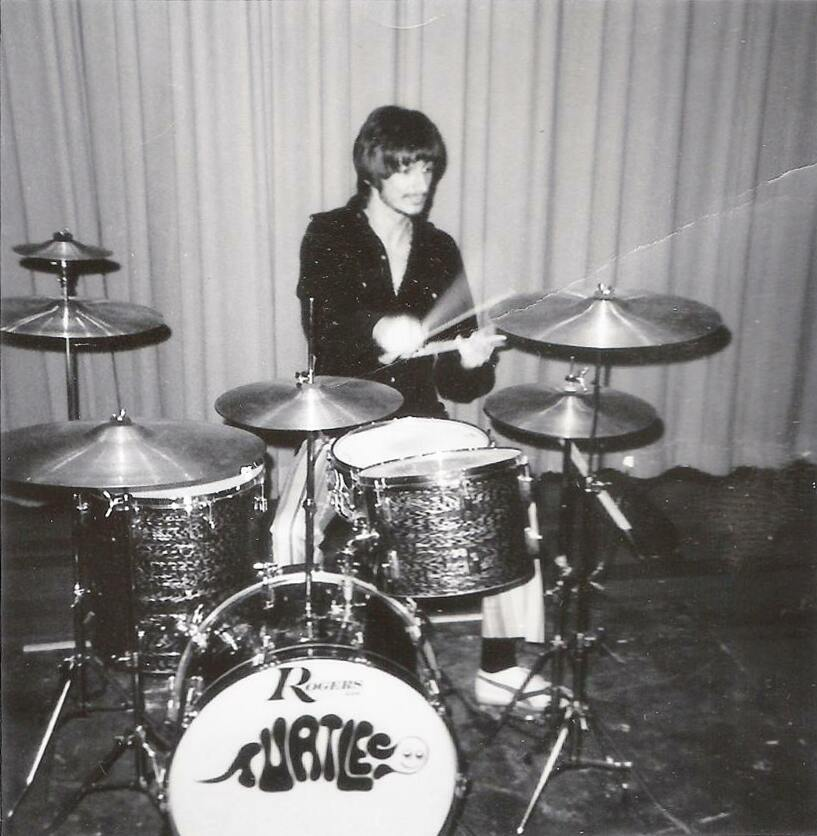
Barbata practicing before a gig with The Turtles, 1966

In spring 1966, The Turtles were looking for a new drummer and Gene Clark of the Byrds recommended Barbata. After an audition with Howard Kaylan, Mark Volman, and Al Nichol, Barbata had the gig. The first song Barbata recorded with the Turtles was "Outside Chance" in July 1966. Barbata played on the Turtles' biggest US hit "Happy Together" which, on March 25, 1967, went to No. 1 on the charts and stayed there for three weeks. One of his trademarks was to incorporate stick twirling into his performances, a technique also used by Dino Danelli of The Rascals and Carmine Appice of Vanilla Fudge.

The Turtles were invited to play on the Ed Sullivan Show (May 14, 1967), The Smothers Brothers Comedy Hour, Hollywood Palace, American Bandstand, Where the Action Is, and The Johnny Carson Show. The group went on to have many other hits with Barbata, including "She'd Rather Be with Me", "You Showed Me", "She's My Girl", and "Elenore". Barbata also appeared on The Dating Game show.

== Crosby, Stills, Nash & Young (1970–1972) ==
In 1970, Barbata was invited to join CSNY after Neil Young fired their previous drummer, Dallas Taylor. They soon after recorded the live album 4 Way Street, which went to #1 on the Billboard 200. Included on the album was the protest song "Ohio", about the Kent State shootings. Barbata continued to play on eight albums with CSNY and the individual members of the quartet, including Graham Nash's Songs for Beginners and Wild Tales, Graham Nash and David Crosby's Graham Nash David Crosby, Stephen Stills' Stephen Stills album, and filling in for Kenny Buttrey with The Stray Gators on Neil Young's live album Time Fades Away.

While Barbata was drumming with CSNY, David Geffen tried to persuade him to join The Eagles. Barbata declined as he was already in one of the biggest musical groups at the time.

== Jefferson Airplane and Jefferson Starship (1972–1978) ==
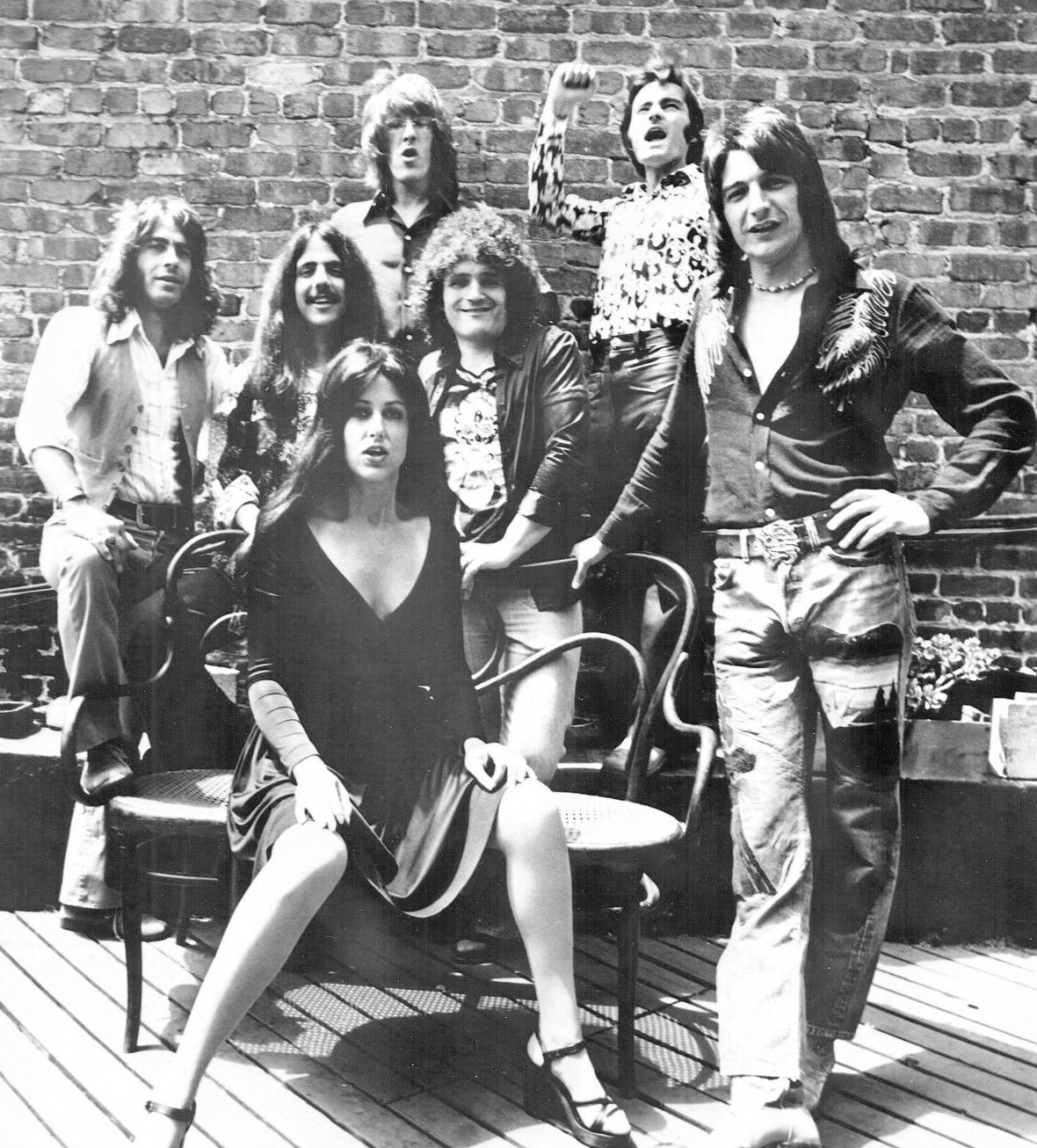
Jefferson Starship 1976

In 1972, while CSNY were on an extended break, David Crosby introduced Barbata to the band Jefferson Airplane, who were looking for a new drummer after their previous one, Joey Covington, quit to do a solo album. Soon after, Barbata joined Jefferson Airplane and went on to record the album Long John Silver (1972) and the live album Thirty Seconds Over Winterland (1973).

When members Jorma Kaukonen (guitarist) and Jack Casady (bassist) left to pursue their band Hot Tuna, the band reformed into Jefferson Starship, adding new members Craig Chaquico and Peter Kaukonen. Their debut album together was Dragon Fly (1974). Barbata later went on to play on Red Octopus (1975), which was the Starship's best-selling album, containing the hit single "Miracles". In 1976, they released the album Spitfire and in 1978 they released Earth. Jefferson Starship appeared on the cover of Rolling Stone in 1978. They also performed as the unnamed band in the Star Wars Holiday Special (1978).

In October 1978, Barbata was in a serious car crash in Northern California that broke his neck, arm and jaw. The injuries took more than a year to recover from, and forced him to resign from Jefferson Starship.

Reflecting on his career, Barbata later said "I was very fortunate ... Most drummers only go around once. I went around three times and played with the best musicians in the world.”

== Personal life ==
At the age of 33, Barbata retired from the mainstream music industry and built a house and recording studio in the remote redwood village of Comptche, California. He continued making music locally. On July 3, 1981, Barbata married the Oklahoma native and artist, Angela Evans (1961–2016). They released two albums together, California and Oklahoma. In 1987, their daughter Leah was born. They later relocated to his late wife's hometown of Ada, Oklahoma, where Barbata resided up to his death. In 2016, after 34 years of marriage, his wife died from cancer. Barbata continued to play music, often performing with former band members or his singer-songwriter daughter.

Barbata died on May 8, 2024 of heart complications, at the age of 79.

== Discography ==
- The Sentinals Big Surf! 1963
- The Sentinals Vegas Go Go 1964
- The Turtles Happy Together 1967
- The Turtles The Turtles Present the Battle of the Bands 1968
- Lee Michaels Recital 1968
- Linda Ronstadt Hand Sown ... Home Grown 1969
- The Fool The Fool 1969
- Ry Cooder Ry Cooder 1970
- Stephen Stills Stephen Stills 1970
- Ethridge/Hill/Barbata L.A. Getaway 1971
- Johnny Rivers Home Grown 1971
- Batdorf & Rodney Off the Shelf 1971
- David Blue Stories 1971
- John Sebastian The Four of Us 1971
- Judee Sill Judee Sill 1971
- The Everly Brothers Stories We Could Tell 1972
- Graham Nash & David Crosby Graham Nash David Crosby
- Graham Nash Songs for Beginners 1972
- Neil Young Time Fades Away 1972
- JD Souther John David Souther 1972
- Jefferson Airplane Long John Silver 1972
- Jefferson Airplane Thirty Seconds Over Winterland 1973
- Graham Nash Wild Tales 1973
- David Blue Nice Baby and the Angel 1973
- The Byrds Byrds 1973
- Booker T. & Priscilla Jones Chronicles 1973
- Paul Kantner, Grace Slick and David Freiberg Baron von Tollbooth & the Chrome Nun 1973
- Grace Slick Manhole 1974
- Jefferson Starship Dragon Fly 1974
- Jefferson Starship Red Octopus 1975
- Jefferson Starship Spitfire 1976
- Jefferson Starship Flight Log 1977
- Jefferson Starship Earth 1978
- Jefferson Starship Gold 1979
- Philo Hayward Rounder 1981
