= We Can Be Together =

1969 song by Jefferson Airplane

Single by Jefferson Airplane

from the album Volunteers
- A-side: "Volunteers"
- Released: October 1969
- Recorded: April 1969
- Studio: Wally Heider Studios, San Francisco, California
- Genre: Hard rock
- Length: 3:50
- Label: RCA Victor
- Songwriter: Paul Kantner
- Producer: Al Schmitt

"We Can Be Together" is a song written by Paul Kantner that was released by Jefferson Airplane as the first track of their 1969 album Volunteers and also as the B-side of their "Volunteers" single.

Allmusic critic Matthew Greenwald described the lyrics as "a virtual "state of the union" address for the counterculture of the late '60s." Kantner was inspired by the Black Panther Party's use of the phrase "Up against the wall, motherfucker" and included it in the chorus. RCA ended up allowing the use of the obscenity in the song because they had previously permitted obscenities in the cast recording to the musical Hair and so had no response to the band when they asked why it was ok in Hair but not in their song. Another phrase in the song that caused some controversy was "tear down the walls", which Kantner took from a Fred Neil album title, and which could be interpreted as either a call to violence or a more metaphoric call to remove barriers.

Greenwald said that musically it is "a basic, three-chord folk-rock anthem" but noted that the bluegrass riff that Kantner learned from David Crosby made it "different" and "unusual". The same riff formed the basis of "Volunteers", which also has a similar chord structure and rhythm to "We Can Be Together".

Baltimore Sun critic Bob Grover praised Grace Slick's vocal and said that "The song has lots of changes of tempo and dynamics, and, except for some persistent guitar intrusion...I found it flawless." Boston Globe critic Ernie Santosuosso also praised Slick's vocals, as well as Nicky Hopkins' "jazzy piano" but noted some "vagueness" in the lyrics. Santosuosso described it as a "predominantly choral piece" and said that it "will stick in your consciousness."

Ultimate Classic Rock critic Michael Gallucci rated it Jefferson Airplane's 4th best song, describing it as a "call for unity among like-minded protesters" and saying that it "the group's growing unrest with the world around them."

While the word "motherfucker" was indeed sung and not censored on the single, it was mixed lower in the mix as compared to the album mix, which had no volume manipulation and presented the song "un-buried". The Airplane performed "We Can Be Together" uncensored on The Dick Cavett Show on August 19, 1969.
