= Balin (album) =

Studio album by Marty Balin
- Released: May 11, 1981
- Recorded: December 1980 – March 1981
- Studio: The Village Recorder (Los Angeles, California); The Record Plant and White Rabbit Studios (Sausalito, California)
- Genre: Rock
- Length: 35:34
- Label: EMI America
- Producer: John Hug

Marty Balin chronology
Balin (1981)	Lucky (1983)

Singles from Balin
- 1. "Hearts"/"Freeway" Released: May 1981; 2. "Atlanta Lady (Something About Your Love)"/"Lydia!" Released: August 1981

Professional ratings
Review scores
Source	Rating
Allmusic	4/5 stars

Balin is Marty Balin's 1981 debut solo album. Two top-40 singles were released, "Hearts" (a U.S. #8 hit, and also his biggest as a solo artist) and "Atlanta Lady (Something About Your Love)" (U.S. #27). The album rose to #35 on the Billboard charts.

== Track listing ==
Side one
No.	Title	Writer(s)	Length
1.	"Hearts"	Jesse Barish	4:32
2.	"You Left Your Mark on Me"	Terry Turrell; Eric J. Burgeson	4:40
3.	"Lydia!"	Rick Nowels; Marty Balin
4.	"Atlanta Lady (Something About Your Love)"	Barish	3:46

Side two
No.	Title	Writer(s)	Length
1.	"Spotlight"	Turrell; Burgeson	3:30
2.	"I Do Believe in You"	Richard Page; John Lang; Steve George; Jerry Manfredi	3:23
3.	"Elvis and Marilyn"	Leon Russell; Kim Fowley; Dyan Diamond	3:05
4.	"Tell Me More"	Obren Bokich; John Whitney	3:48
5.	"Music Is the Light"	Barish	4:17
Total length:			35:34

== CD releases ==
Balin was released by American Beat on CD in 2008 and by EMI in 2009. Both editions featured the shorter, single version of "Hearts" rather than the longer album version.

In March 2013, BGO reissued the album along with the follow-up release Lucky on one CD. Mastered by Andrew Thompson the BGO edition is the only CD version that features the full-length album version of "Hearts".

In 2020, A&M alongside Universal Music Japan re-released the title as a part of the AOR Light Mellow 1000 series.

== Charts ==
Chart (1981)	Peak position
US Pop	35

Singles

Year	Single	Chart	Position
1981	"Hearts"	US Pop	8
1981	"Hearts"	US AC	9
1981	"Hearts"	US Rock	20
1981	"Atlanta Lady (Something About Your Love)"	US Pop	27
1981	"Atlanta Lady (Something About Your Love)"	US AC	11

== Personnel ==
- Marty Balin – lead vocals, acoustic guitar
- Pete Sears – keyboards, synthesizers
- Mark Cummings – pianos, synthesizers, vocoder, backing vocals
- Johnny De Caro – guitars, backing vocals
- Richard Bassil – bass, backing vocals
- Billy Lee Lewis – drums, percussion, backing vocals

=== Additional personnel ===
- Michael Boddicker – vocoder (2)
- John Jarvis – acoustic piano (4, 6)
- Neil Larsen – electric piano (9), synthesizers (9)
- John Hug – guitars, string arrangements and conductor
- Ken Watson – cymbalum (1)
- Bobbye Hall – percussion
- Steve Forman – percussion
- Harry Bluestone – concertmaster
- Frank DeCaro – contractor
- Bill Champlin – backing vocals (1)
- Rick Nowels – backing vocals
- David E. Landau – backing vocals

== Production ==
- A Great Pyramid Ltd. Production.
- John Hug – producer
- Tom Flye – engineer
- Ann Fry – assistant engineer
- Clif Jones – assistant engineer
- Recorded at The Village Recorders, (Los Angeles) and The Record Plant (Sausalito)
- Mixed at The Record Plant
- "Elvis and Marilyn" recorded at White Rabbit Studios (Sausalito)
- Greg Calbi – mastering at Sterling Sound (New York City, New York)
- David E. Landau – production coordinator
- Bill Burks – art direction
- Richard Avedon – Marty Balin photography
- Tom Gibson – other photography
- Joe Buchwald – chief executive, management
