= Last Flight =

Last Flight may refer to:

- The Last Flight (1931 film), a 1931 film starring Richard Barthelmess
- The Last Flight (2009 film), a 2009 French film starring Marion Cotillard
- Last Flight (book), a 1937 book by Amelia Earhart
- Last Flight (film), a 2014 Chinese film starring Ed Westwick
- Last Flight (Jefferson Airplane album), a 2000 live album by Jefferson Airplane
- The Last Flight (Public Service Broadcasting album), a 2024 album by Public Service Broadcasting
- "The Last Flight" (The Twilight Zone), a 1960 episode of the American television series The Twilight Zone
- Last Flight, a cancelled Wii game by Bloober Team
