= Karen Deal =

- Also known as: Karen Deal Balin
- Born: 6 Oct 1953; Tampa, Florida, United States
- Died: 19 Nov 2010
- Instrument: Keyboards

Karen Deal (October 6, 1953 – November 19, 2010) was a musician from Tampa, Florida and a member of bands such as Johnny Charrow Review as the keyboard player. She was also a member of a local psychedelic rock band called The Mod Squad. She was married to Marty Balin, a founding member of Jefferson Airplane.

== Background ==
Karen graduated from Tampa Catholic High School in 1971. She was the daughter of Arch Deal, a newscaster with WFLA, and Margaret Lane, a church organist. Karen and her band, The Mod Squad, opened for The Marty Balin Group. She met Balin and they married shortly thereafter. They have a daughter Delany.

== Career ==
When she first started out, Deal often jammed in area parks. She also started a Latino band and played the local clubs in the Tampa area. That band, called Sweet Smoke, did Santana covers. The group included Beau Fisher who later became part of the psychedelic, hard rock group White Witch.

In February 1977, Deal was in the Johnny Charro review, playing the ARP synthesizer at the Florida Citrus Festival. She became a member of The Mod Squad in 1987, a local group from Tampa, which consisted of herself on keyboards, bass and background vocals, Rodger Stephan on drums and vocals, Joey Donovan on guitar and vocals. During their time, the group either opened for or shared the stage with acts such as Marty Balin, Mark Farner, Spirit, the Spencer Davis Group, Savoy Brown, Richard Marx and others. By 1989, she had left the Mod Squad and had relocated to California with Marty Balin who would become her husband.

In 1989, Deal toured with a reunited Jefferson Airplane and videotaped the event. In 1991, Deal had a prominent role on husband Marty Balin's Better Generation album. She co produced the album as well as taking part in composing some of the material. She played keyboards and keyboard bass as well as contributing vocals and background vocals. Two female singers were brought in to the sessions. They were Ellie Marshall, who was the backup singer for the group Modern Lovers and CBS vocalist Didi Stewart. That plan didn't happen as Deal stopped it straight away preferring to have the group's musicians handling the vocal duties. During the early 90s, along with two other female musician vocalists, she was a member of Balin's band Wolfpack, who in addition to touring, played in Russia. She also played on Balin's 1995 album I Wish I Were, playing keyboards, keyboard Bass, contributing both vocals and background vocals. She co-produced the album as well.

Deal also played on some recordings by the reformed Jefferson Airplane. They were "It's No Secret" and "Always Tomorrow".

Deal didn't sing much but her father said that she had the perfect pitch.

=== Playing style ===
When she was in the Mod Squad, she would play the bass parts with one hand and the keyboard parts with the other hand. Bandmate Joey Donovan said she was half the band and referred to her as phenomenal. In February 1977, while as a member of the Johnny Charro Review which was appearing at the Florida Citrus Festival, photographer Charles Newton captured her during a warm-up to the event, holding a sandwich with one hand and playing the ARP synthesizer with the other.

== Death ==
Karen Deal died in the early hours on Friday, November 19, 2010, aged 57. She had been in a coma for a month after choking while at dinner with her family.

=== Legacy ===
2014 marked the fourth year of a charity concert in her name. The proceeds to go to Lifepath Hospice. The bands performing were The Lint Rollers, Coo Coo Ca Choo and Stormbringer. The following year Karen’s Deal – A Benefit for Lifepath Hospice was held at Skipper's Smokehouse. She is written about in the last chapter of Corporate Fall Guy: The Ups and Downs of a TV Anchor/Skydiver, autobiography written by her father Arch Deal.

== Discography and work ==
Various artists compilation albums
Artist	Album title	Type	Label	catalogue #	Year	Format	Role
Marty Balin	Better Generation	Album	GWE Records	GWE002	1991	Compact disc	Producer, Session musician: keyboards, keyboard bass, vocals
Marty Balin	I Wish I Were	Album	Beverly Records	BEV 013	1995	Compact disc	Co-producer, mixing. Keyboards, keyboard bass, vocals
Jefferson Airplane	Then And Now Vol 1	Various artists album	San Francisco Sound	SFS-03931 -	?	compact disc	Keyboards, vocals on "It's No Secret"
Jefferson Airplane	Then And Now Vol 2	Various artists album	San Francisco Sound	SFS-03932	?	Compact disc	Keyboards, bass, vocals on "Always Tomorrow
