= Arch Deal =

American newscaster (1931–2020)

Arch Deal (October 5, 1931 – March 13, 2020, aged 88) was an American newscaster with WFLA-TV in Tampa, Florida, having started in 1959. He was also the father of Tampa musician Karen Deal.

An avid skydiver, Deal had made more than 5,000 jumps by 2002. In June 1975, his chute malfunctioned and he hit the ground at 120 mph. He suffered a broken neck, broken pelvis, and cracked ribs. In three months time, he returned to work at his WFLA-Ch. 8 job. He later worked at radio station WRBQ-FM 104.7 as a sky traffic reporter until 1992.

== Personal life ==
In 1991, he became a father again, fathering a daughter.

In 2010, his 57-year-old daughter Karen died, having been in a coma for a month after choking at dinner.

Deal died on March 13, 2020, also after choking on food. He is survived by daughters, Diane and Michelle Deal and his son, Doug Deal.

== Published work ==
- Corporate Fall Guy ISBN 0578086468, 9780578086460 (2011)
