= Count On Me (Jefferson Starship song) =

"Count on Me"

Single by Jefferson Starship

from the album Earth
- B-side: "Show Yourself"
- Released: March 1978
- Genre: Rock, soft rock
- Length: 3:14
- Label: Grunt
- Songwriter: Jesse Barish
- Producers: Larry Cox and Jefferson Starship

Jefferson Starship singles chronology
| "St. Charles" (1976) | "Count on Me" (1978) | "Runaway" (1978) |

Alternative cover
- US single sleeve

"Count on Me" is a 1978 song and single by Jefferson Starship written by Jesse Barish for the album Earth. The single, in lighter rock mode, gave Starship another US Top 10 hit after "Miracles". It was featured in the end credits to the movies Grown Ups and The Family Stone.

Cash Box said it has "piano licks, a moderate beat, solid acoustic guitar solo and Marty Balin’s familiar and distinctive vocals." Record World called it "a fine pop tune with a country flavor."

Barish released his own version, also in 1978.

== Background and recording ==
Songwriter Jesse Barish had originally recorded a demo of “Count on Me” and considered releasing the song himself. According to Barish, Marty Balin subsequently told him that Jefferson Starship wanted to record it, and Barish agreed because he believed the established band would be able to give the song greater exposure. Balin provided the lead vocal on Jefferson Starship’s recording. Pete Sears played piano, organ and celeste, while David Freiberg played bass.

== Chart performance ==
=== Weekly charts ===
| Chart (1978) | Peak position |
|---|---|
| Canada Top Singles (RPM) | 9 |
| Canada (RPM) Adult Contemporary | 6 |
| New Zealand (Recorded Music NZ) | 24 |
| US Billboard Hot 100 | 8 |
| US Adult Contemporary (Billboard) | 15 |

=== Year-end charts ===
| Chart (1978) | Rank |
|---|---|
| Canada | 73 |
| U.S. Billboard | 66 |

== Cover versions ==
- Balin released a new version on his 1999 solo album Marty Balin Greatest Hits.
