= Runaway (Jefferson Starship song) =

- US variant of standard artwork

Single by Jefferson Starship

from the album Earth
- B-side: "Hot Water"
- Released: May 1978
- Genre: Rock, soft rock
- Length: 5:18; 3:40 (single edit)
- Label: Grunt
- Songwriter: N.Q. Dewey
- Producers: Jefferson Starship, Larry Cox

Jefferson Starship singles chronology
"Count On Me" (1978)	"Runaway" (1978)	"Crazy Feelin'" (1978)

"Runaway" is a 1978 song and single by Jefferson Starship, written by Nicholas Q. Dewey for the album Earth. It was the second U.S. Top 40 hit from that album, and was the follow-up to the Top 10 hit "Count On Me". The song peaked at #12 on the U.S. Billboard Hot 100 and number 13 on the Cash Box Top 100.

Cash Box said that "the guitar work is shiny and moody" and "Balin's vocals are alternately smooth and gritty." Record World said that it "finds Marty Balin in fine voice, even sounding a bit like Al Green at times."

In Canada, both "Runaway" and its predecessor peaked at number nine. "Runaway" was the 79th biggest Canadian hit of the year, ranking just six positions behind "Count On Me".

== Chart performance ==
=== Weekly charts ===
Chart (1978)	Peak position
Canada RPM Top Singles	9
US Billboard Hot 100	12
US Adult Contemporary (Billboard)	37
U.S. Cash Box Top 100	13

=== Year-end charts ===
Chart (1978)	Rank
Canada	79

== Cover versions ==
- Balin released a new version on his 1999 solo album, Marty Balin Greatest Hits.
