= Better Generation =

Studio album by Marty Balin
- Released: January 16, 1991
- Studios: The Loft (Nashville, Tennessee); Golden Studios (Hancock, New Hampshire); Blue Jay Recording Studios (Carlisle, Massachusetts)
- Genre: Rock
- Length: 67:40
- Label: GWE
- Producers: Marty Balin; Kerry Kearney

Marty Balin chronology
Balince (1990)	Better Generation (1991)	Freedom Flight (1997)

Professional ratings
Review scores
Source	Rating
Allmusic	2.5/5 stars

Better Generation is Marty Balin's 1991 album and his first solo album since 1983. The album was produced shortly after Jefferson Airplane's reunion album and tour, without any other members of Jefferson Airplane involved. Balin's wife, Karen Deal, co-wrote a song on the album, and played keyboards on most tracks. The track "See the Light" later appeared on Jefferson Starship's album Windows of Heaven as a re-recorded song.

== Track listing ==
No.	Title	Writer(s)	Length
1.	"Better Generation"	George M. Green; Rick Giles	5:33
2.	"Skydiver"	Marty Balin; Karen Deal	7:14
3.	"Mercy of the Moon"	Al Staehely	6:20
4.	"Green Light"	Gene Heart; David Evan	4:31
5.	"Let It Live"	Balin	3:27
6.	"Wish I Were"	Balin	1:40
7.	"Don't Change on Me"	Eddie Reeves; Jimmy Holiday	3:26
8.	"Let's Go"	Balin	4:11
9.	"See the Light"	Jesse Barish	4:06
10.	"It's No Secret"	Balin	2:30
11.	"Even Though"	Billy Crain	4:24
12.	"Always Tomorrow"	Kerry Kearney	4:11
13.	"Treadin' Water"	Gary Harrison; Karen Staley; Kent Robbins	5:20
14.	"Lady Now"	Kearney	3:46
15.	"Volunteers"	Balin; Paul Kantner	3:18
16.	"Summer of Love"	Balin	4:19
Total length:			67:40

== Personnel ==
- Marty Balin – vocals, acoustic guitar, percussion
- Karen Deal – keyboards, keyboard bass, backing vocals
- Kerry Kearney – electric lead guitars, 6-string and 12-string acoustic guitars, mandolin, bass guitar, backing vocals
- Ed Michaels – drums

Personnel on "Mercy of the Moon"

- Marty Balin – vocals
- John Barlow Jarvis – acoustic piano
- Phil Naish – synthesizers
- Richard Bennett – electric guitar
- Biff Watson – gut-string guitar
- Bernie Leadon – mandola
- Sonny Garrish – pedal steel guitar
- Willie Weeks – bass
- Harry Stinson – drums
- Terry McMillan – harmonica
