= Play on Love =

1975 single by Jefferson Starship

Single by Jefferson Starship

from the album Red Octopus
- B-side: "I Want to See Another World"
- Released: December 1975
- Recorded: 1975
- Genre: Rock; power pop
- Length: 3:44
- Label: Grunt/RCA Records
- Songwriters: Grace Slick, Pete Sears
- Producers: Jefferson Starship, Larry Cox

Jefferson Starship singles chronology
"Miracles" (1975)	"Play on Love" (1975)	"With Your Love" (1976)

"Play on Love" is a 1975 song by Jefferson Starship. It was the second of two singles issued from their Red Octopus LP.

The song reached number 49 on the U.S. Billboard Hot 100 and number 47 on Cash Box during January 1976. In Canada, "Play on Love" spent two weeks at number 46.

Cash Box said it was "one of the strongest cuts out of the Red Octopus album," and Grace Slick belts an easy enough melody for kids to pick up on with a terrific hook, 'play on love.'" Record World called it a "choice album track with Grace taking the lead vocal and maneuvering the Starship to still higher plateaus."

== Chart history ==
Chart (1975–76)	Peak position
Canada RPM Top Singles	46
U.S. Billboard Hot 100	49
U.S. Cash Box Top 100	47
