= Aquatarium (Florida) =

Former amusement park in St. Pete Beach, Florida

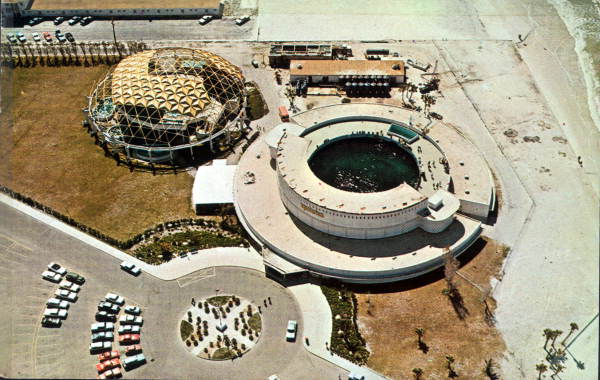
- Aerial view of the Aquatarium on a 1960s postcard
- Interactive map of Aquatarium
- Location: St. Pete Beach, Florida, United States
- Coordinates: 27.7347228°N 82.7494410°W
- Status: Defunct
- Opened: 1964
- Closed: 1977

The Aquatarium (also known as Shark World) was a 17-acre tourist attraction located in St. Pete Beach, Florida. It operated from 1964 to 1977, between 64th and 66th avenues.

== Aquatarium ==
The Aquatarium opened in 1964, with its main attraction being shows featuring trained dolphins, sea lions, and pilot whales. Shows were staged under a 160-foot, golden geodesic dome, which sheltered the audience as they were seated around the world's largest circular marine tank (100 feet in diameter, 25 feet deep, containing 1.244 million gallons of seawater). The Aquatarium shows were billed as "The World's Greatest Marine Show," or "World's Largest Marine Attraction," and starred a dolphin named "Floppy." Floppy was famed for her 25-foot leaps into the air, leading to her characterization as "the world-champion high-jumping dolphin."

In 1968, the Aquatarium was purchased by local hotelier Frank Cannova for two million dollars. In 1974, Cannova opened The Hawaiian Inn.

== Shark World ==
Due to the 1971 opening of Walt Disney World, as well as the gasoline shortages of the mid-1970s, tourism in Pinellas County experienced a significant decline. In 1976, in order to combat the declining fortunes of the park, the owners (inspired by the popularity of the 1975 film Jaws) attempted to rebrand the Aquatarium as "Shark World". Despite their efforts, the park closed at the end of the 1977 summer season.
