= Do It for Love (Marty Balin song) =

Single by Marty Balin

from the album Lucky
- B-side: "Will You Forever"
- Released: 1983
- Genre: Pop rock
- Length: 4:07
- Label: EMI America
- Songwriter(s): Jesse Barish
- Producer(s): Val Garay

Marty Balin singles chronology
"What Love Is" (1983)	"Do It for Love" (1983)

"Do It for Love" is a song written by Jesse Barish and performed by Marty Balin. It reached No. 17 on the U.S. adult contemporary chart and No. 102 on the U.S. pop chart in 1983. The song was featured on his 1983 album, Lucky.

The song was produced by Val Garay.
