= Freedom Flight (Marty Balin album) =

Studio album by Marty Balin
- Released: 1997
- Studio: American Studios and The Emporium (Nashville, Tennessee); Profound Sound (St. Louis, Missouri)
- Genre: Rock
- Length: 36:18
- Label: Solid Discs
- Producer: Richard Landers; Michael Arnold (exec.)

Marty Balin chronology
Better Generation (1991)	Freedom Flight (1997)	Marty Balin Greatest Hits (1999)

Professional ratings
Review scores
Source	Rating
Allmusic	3/5 stars

Freedom Flight is Marty Balin's 1997 studio album. Unlike his previous solo efforts which utilized many supporting musicians, this album had Marty performing only with his own guitar work and some background vocalists.

== Track listing ==
All songs by Richard Landers except where noted.

1. "Beautiful Girl" (Landers, Gale Landers) – 3:15
2. "Fire" – 4:13
3. "My Heart Picked You" – 2:52
4. "Until You" – 3:59
5. "Can't Forget the Night" – 3:43
6. "A Part of Me" – 4:30
7. "Sexy Eyes" (Landers, Landers) – 3:39
8. "Heart of Stone" – 4:33
9. "Goddess" (Marty Balin) – 4:06
10. "Freedom Flight" – 3:36

== Personnel ==
- Marty Balin – vocals, guitars
- Dirk Johnson – keyboards, acoustic piano, guitars
- Michael Severs – guitars
- Jimmy Carter – bass
- Shannon Forrest – drums, percussion
- Nannette Britt – backing vocals
- Kelli Bruce – backing vocals
- Vickie Carrico – backing vocals

=== Production ===
- David Arnold – executive producer
- Rich Landers – producer, overdub producer and arrangements
- Jerry Holmes – co-producer (1, 5), overdub producer and arrangements, mixing (1, 2, 4, 5, 7, 9)
- Terry Alldaffer – engineer (1, 3)
- Tom Hayden – tracking engineer, mixing (3, 6, 8, 10)
- John Nolan – overdub tracking engineer, mixing (1, 2, 4, 5, 7, 9)
- Jorge Alvarez – photography
- Dennis Loren – art direction, design, imaging
- Thomas Fletcher – additional digital imaging
