= Lucky (Marty Balin album) =

Studio album by Marty Balin
- Released: February 11, 1983
- Recorded: August 16 – December 3, 1982
- Studio: Record One (Los Angeles, California)
- Genre: Rock; pop rock; soft rock
- Length: 37:30
- Label: EMI America
- Producer: Val Garay

Marty Balin chronology
Balin (1981)	Lucky (1983)	There's No Shoulder (1983)

Singles from Lucky
- 1. "What Love Is" / "Heart of Stone" Released: February 1983; 2. "Do It for Love" / "Will You Forever" Released: 1983

Professional ratings
Review scores
Source	Rating
Allmusic	2/5 stars

Lucky is the second solo album by Marty Balin. It was released in 1983 on EMI America Records. The album reached No. 156 on the Billboard Top LPs & Tape chart. As a subtle tribute to Balin's friend and former bandmate Jack Casady, he recorded a cover of "Heart of Stone", an original written by Brian Marnell from Casady's new wave group SVT.

== Track listing ==
Side one
No.	Title	Writer(s)	Length
1.	"Born to Be a Winner"	Julio de Caro; Steve Head	4:22
2.	"What Do People Like?"	De Caro	3:49
3.	"Just Like That"	Steve Goldstein; Bob Getter; Adrian Peritore	2:49
4.	"Do It for Love"	Jesse Barish	4:07
5.	"What Love Is"	Greg Prestopino; Brock Walsh	4:44

Side two
No.	Title	Writer(s)	Length
6.	"Heart of Stone"	Brian Marnell	3:13
7.	"Palm of Your Hand"	Rick Marotta; Debra Barsha; Bob Alan	3:53
8.	"Will You Forever"	John Farey; John Whitney	3:20
9.	"All We Really Need"	Balin; Franne Golde; Goldstein; Peter Ivers	3:55
10.	"When Love Comes"	Gene Heart; David Evan	3:18
Total length:			37:30

== Charts ==
Chart (1983)	Peak position
US Pop	156

Singles

Year	Single	Chart	Position
1983	"What Love Is"	US Pop	63
1983	"Do It for Love"	US Pop	107
1983	"Do It for Love"	US AC	17

== Personnel ==
- Marty Balin – vocals
- Steve Goldstein – keyboards, synthesizers, horn arrangements
- Louis Biancaniello – synthesizers
- Waddy Wachtel – guitars
- Kevin McCormick – bass
- Rick Marotta – drums
- M. L. Benoit – percussion
- Bill Bergman – horns
- Jerry Peterson – horns
- Greg Smith – horns
- Jim Price – horns
- Mike Slusher – horns
- Kenneth W. Tussing – horns
- Darrell Leonard – horns
- Lee Thornburg – horns, horn arrangements
- Jimmie Haskell – strings arrangements and conductor
- Sidney Sharp – concertmaster
- Bill Champlin – backing vocals
- Daniel Moore – backing vocals
- Matthew Moore – backing vocals

Production

- A Great Pyramid Ltd. Production
- Val Garay – producer, recording
- Niko Bolas – recording assistant
- Richard Bosworth – recording assistant
- Doug Sax – mastering at The Mastering Lab (Hollywood, California)
- Andy Engel – lettering
- Aaron Rapoport – photography
- Kosh and Ron Larson – design, art direction
