= The Power of Gold =

1978 single by Dan Fogelberg and Tim Weisberg

Single by Dan Fogelberg and Tim Weisberg

from the album Twin Sons of Different Mothers
- B-side: "Lahaina Luna"
- Released: 1978
- Recorded: 1978
- Genre: Rock
- Length: 4:34
- Label: Full Moon Records
- Songwriter: Dan Fogelberg
- Producers: Dan Fogelberg; Tim Weisberg

Dan Fogelberg singles chronology
"Love Gone By" (1977)	"The Power of Gold" (1978)	"Longer" (1979)

"The Power of Gold" is a song by Dan Fogelberg and Tim Weisberg. It was released in 1978 as a single from their album Twin Sons of Different Mothers. It was also featured on the compilation album Portrait: The Music of Dan Fogelberg, a 4-CD boxed set, released in 1997.

The song peaked at No. 24 on the Billboard Hot 100, and at number 23 on the Cash Box Top 100 Singles.

== Background ==
Fogelberg and Weisberg had planned a "grandiose orchestral piece" for the close of Twin Sons of Different Mothers. They recorded the entire track only to discover, too late, that the piano was out of tune with the orchestra and had to be redone. Rather than incur that cost, Fogelberg wrote a quick song, now thinking that maybe one commercial track might not be such a bad idea, and at the last minute, "The Power Of Gold" was recorded and added to the album.

== Critical reception ==
Author Dave DiMartino from Billboard Books, said the single was the "product of an interesting collaboration between Fogelberg and Weisberg", and "an experiment that worked". Rick Clark wrote in All Music Guide: The Best CD's, Albums and Tapes that the single is a "pleasant instrumental number" and the duo "scored a hit" with the song. Thom Duffy of the Orlando Sentinel said the song was "sleek and sweatless as it is sincere". Alanna Nash wrote in the Stereo Review that the single was "truly memorable", but also criticized Fogelberg for being "the ultimate symbol of the overly sensitive male". Gene Armstrong wrote in the Arizona Daily Star that the song was a "sweet innocuous tune", with a "little rowdy guitar" and a "taste of genteel saxophone".

== Chart performance ==
Chart (1978)	Peak position
US Billboard Hot 100	24
Canada RPM Top Singles	51
Cash Box Top 100 Singles	23

== See also ==
- Dan Fogelberg discography
- Tim Weisberg discography
