= Red Octopus =

Studio album by Jefferson Starship
- Released: June 13, 1975
- Recorded: February 1975
- Studios: Wally Heider, San Francisco, CA
- Genres: Rock, art pop, soft rock
- Length: 42:00; 61:58 (Including 2005 CD Bonus Tracks)
- Label: Grunt
- Producers: Jefferson Starship, Larry Cox

Jefferson Starship chronology
Dragon Fly (1974)	Red Octopus (1975)	Spitfire (1976)

Alternative cover
- Cover art of original LP release

Red Octopus is the second album by American rock band Jefferson Starship, released on Grunt Records in 1975. Certified double platinum by RIAA in 1995, it is the best-selling album by any incarnation of Jefferson Airplane and its spin-off groups. The single "Miracles" was the highest-charting single any permutation of the band had until Starship's "We Built This City" a decade later, ultimately peaking at No. 3 on the Billboard singles chart; the album itself reached No. 1 for four non-consecutive weeks on the Billboard 200. As was common in the era, stereo and quadraphonic mixes of the album were released concurrently.

== Background ==
The first Jefferson Starship album Dragon Fly had been a considerable success, going gold and restoring the Jefferson band name to prominence in the rock world. The band mounted a successful tour behind the album in the fall of 1974; when the tour reached San Francisco's Winterland Ballroom on November 24, singer Marty Balin rejoined his old bandmates on stage for an encore that included "Caroline" (on which he had sung lead on Dragon Fly, with David Freiberg taking the lead in Marty's absence for the other dates on the tour), "Somebody to Love," and "Volunteers." The guest appearance was warmly received, which encouraged Balin to join the group full-time, albeit on an album-by-album basis. One of the prerequisites to his joining was that the group record his new song "Miracles."

In the meantime, the countercultural fervor of the late 1960s and early 1970s that had birthed Jefferson Airplane had largely dissipated. President Nixon had resigned and the Vietnam War was coming to a close. After experiencing such a heady, radical period many Americans now yearned for a simpler, less stressful time, as reflected by the success of 1950s nostalgia shows like Happy Days and films such as American Graffiti. With the revolutionary preoccupations that had fueled the Airplane's rise no longer in vogue by 1975, the band began to turn a critical shift in style, both musically and lyrically.

== Songs and recording ==
Sessions for Red Octopus were held in February 1975 at Wally Heider Studios with Larry Cox producing, as had been the case for Dragon Fly. The album took less than a month to record, using an eight-member lineup that was the same as the prior album with the addition of Balin on vocals. Balin also ended up writing or co-writing five of the album's ten songs, a share he had not contributed to the group since the early days of the Airplane. The sessions went smoothly, with guitarist Craig Chaquico later noting "I really loved playing on that album...it was so great being in a band like that with eight people. They were all different singers, different songwriters, with different styles – from Papa John Creach, an old black violin player, to the teenage-hippie lead guitarist."

The group attempted to create a polished commercial sound, which was a contrast to their past works and paved the path for their next few albums. Musically, the album built on the tighter, more pop-oriented direction of Dragon Fly, with all but two tracks under five minutes in length; however, an eclectic variety was maintained by including two virtuoso instrumentals, violinist Papa John Creach's funky jig "Git Fiddler" and keyboardist Pete Sears' complex baroque prog-rocker "Sandalphon."

Lyrically, most of the songs now revolved around a broad-based romanticism that could be enjoyed by a mass audience, although remnants of previous countercultural concerns remained in Slick's "Fast Buck Freddie" and Kantner's "I Want To See Another World." Whereas in the days of the Airplane some members of the group would poke fun at Marty's love ballads, they were welcomed on Red Octopus. The soft rock of "Tumblin'" featured words co-written by Balin and Grateful Dead lyricist Robert Hunter with music by David Freiberg, while the closing, progressive-leaning anthem "There Will Be Love" was a Balin collaboration with Kantner and Chaquico which featured sweeping symphonic orchestration. The centerpiece of the album was "Miracles," a nearly seven-minute soul ballad with strings and saxophone which Balin claimed had been inspired by both his girlfriend and the Indian guru Sathya Sai Baba, who observers said could produce miracles with his hands. Producer Larry Cox later praised the group's harmonies on the track, noting "once they (Marty and Grace) start singing together, there's just something there you don't teach or rehearse. You're just damn lucky to capture it on tape."

Grace Slick also penned several romantically tinged compositions including "Ai Garimasu (There Is Love)" and the album's second single, the catchy, upbeat pop of "Play On Love," but her opinion of the band's new direction was less favorable. She complained that half the songs on the new album "did not say anything new nor did they have any unusual expression. Unless you have a unique way of saying boy loves girl or girl loves boy, it's a waste of time," although she singled out "Miracles" as an exception due to its special imagery.

Two outtakes from the album, "The Sky is Full of Ships Tonight" and "I'll Be Here Forever," were penned by Tom Pacheco, who had contributed "All Fly Away" on Dragon Fly.

== Album title and artwork ==
The word "red" in the album's title was a tribute to communist China (a country both Paul and Grace had a fascination with at the time, going back to 1973's "Sketches of China" and 1974's "Ride The Tiger"), while the word "octopus" referred to the new lineup's eight-member configuration. The album cover artwork by Frank Mulvey reflected this title by featuring gold lettering on a solid red background, with the drawing of a red octopus with a heart at its center placed in the middle of a gold circle.

Professional ratings
Review scores
Source	Rating
AllMusic	4.5/5 stars
Christgau's Record Guide	B−

== Release and reception ==
Red Octopus was released on June 13, 1975, just as the band began a lengthy summer and fall tour in support. Propelled by the success of the edited single version of "Miracles," which hit No. 3 on Billboard, the album itself became a runaway blockbuster, topping the US charts for four non-consecutive weeks and going gold by August; it was eventually certified 2× platinum by the RIAA. The follow up single "Play on Love" also charted at No. 49, as the group became one of America's hottest acts.

Critical reception to the album was largely mixed. Ed Ward led off a review in Rolling Stone by stating "If it weren't for Balin, Red Octopus would be completely unlistenable" before going on to single out "Miracles" and "There Will Be Love" as the best tracks ("not only good for them, but downright good"), while savaging the efforts of other band members. Over at The Village Voice, Robert Christgau claimed "this is indeed their most significant album of the decade, but what does it signify?" before bemusedly adding "While the returned Marty Balin is the most soulful folkie ever to set voice to plastic, he remains a mushbrain," ultimately awarding the album a B− grade. By contrast, Billboard praised the album, leading with "The recharged Starship duplicates the power and energy of the early Airplane while still bringing fresh elements to the music," noting "excellent lyrics and vocal interchanges by Balin and Slick are high points." Cashbox was also favorable, calling it "an album of strengths" and concluding it was "eight musical arms to hold you."

Retrospective reviews are largely favorable. William Rhulmann at AllMusic noted that "the album is more ballad-heavy and melodic than the Airplane albums, which made it more accessible to the broader audience it reached, though "Sweeter Than Honey" is as tough a rocker as the band ever played." Ultimate Classic Rock observed that the album "succeeded through sheer force of varietal will. Major contributions from guitarist Craig Chaquico, violinist Papa John Creach, keyboardist Freiberg and bassist/multi-instrumentalist Pete Sears gave the album a compelling momentum, even for those who arrived having only known "Miracles" from the radio. From song to song, Red Octopus played to every strength of Jefferson Starship's collaborative whole."

Many of the reviews often praised Balin's return as he resumed leadership prominence within the group, although there would now be pressure on him to follow up the success of Red Octopus and "Miracles." Later, Slick noted "That was Marty's era, the Starship thing. We were coming out of screwball topics for lyrics...and getting more into dance music and romantic love, which is Marty's forte. So he got his chance to shine."

In the fall of 1975, Papa John Creach left the band to pursue his solo career; he was not replaced.

== Track listing ==
Side one
No.	Title	Lyrics	Music	Length
1.	"Fast Buck Freddie"	Grace Slick	Craig Chaquico	3:28
2.	"Miracles"	Marty Balin	Marty Balin	6:52
3.	"Git Fiddler" (instrumental)		Papa John Creach, Kevin Moore, John Parker	3:08
4.	"Ai Garimasũ (There Is Love)"	Grace Slick	Grace Slick	4:15
5.	"Sweeter than Honey"	Balin, Craig Chaquico	Craig Chaquico, Pete Sears	3:20

Side two
No.	Title	Lyrics	Music	Length
6.	"Play on Love"	Grace Slick	Pete Sears	3:44
7.	"Tumblin'"	Marty Balin, Robert Hunter	David Freiberg	3:27
8.	"I Want to See Another World"	Paul Kantner, Grace Slick, Marty Balin	Paul Kantner	4:34
9.	"Sandalphon" (instrumental)		Pete Sears	4:08
10.	"There Will Be Love"	Paul Kantner, Marty Balin	Paul Kantner, Craig Chaquico	5:04

2005 CD bonus tracks
No.	Title	Lyrics	Music	Length
11.	"Miracles" (single version)	Marty Balin	Marty Balin	3:29
12.	"Band Introduction" (live, November 7, 1975 at Winterland)			1:14
13.	"Fast Buck Freddie" (live, November 7, 1975 at Winterland)	Grace Slick	Craig Chaquico	3:34
14.	"There Will Be Love" (live, November 7, 1975 at Winterland)	Paul Kantner, Marty Balin	Paul Kantner, Craig Chaquico	4:57
15.	"You're Driving Me Crazy" (live, November 7, 1975 at Winterland)	Vic Smith	Vic Smith	6:44

== Personnel ==
Jefferson Starship

- Marty Balin – lead vocals (2, 5, 7, 10), backing vocals
- Grace Slick – lead vocals, (1, 4, 6), piano (4), backing vocals
- Paul Kantner – lead vocals (8), rhythm guitar, backing vocals
- Craig Chaquico – lead guitar, backing vocals
- Papa John Creach – electric violin
- David Freiberg – organ (2, 8), bass (3, 6, 9), ARP synthesizer (4, 10), keyboards (7), backing vocals
- Pete Sears – bass (1, 2, 4, 5, 7, 8, 10), electric piano (2, 11), keyboards (3, 5), acoustic piano (6, 8–10), organ (6, 8, 9), clavinet (6), ARP synthesizer (9), backing vocals
- John Barbata – drums, percussion, backing vocals

Additional musicians

- Bobbye Hall – percussion, congas
- Irv Cox – saxophone
- Dave Roberts – string and horn arrangement

Production

- Jefferson Starship – producer
- Larry Cox – producer, engineer
- Pat Ieraci (Maurice) – production coordinator
- Steve Mantoani, Jeffrey Husband – recordists
- Paul Dowell – amp consultant
- Recorded and mixed at Wally Heider's, San Francisco
- Mastered by Kent Duncan, Kendun Recorders, Burbank
- Live tracks recorded at Winterland, November 7, 1975
- Frank Mulvey – art director
- Jim Marshall – liner photograph
- Gribbitt! – graphics

== Charts ==
Chart (1975–76)	Peak position
Australian albums (Kent Music Report)	69
Canada Top Albums/CDs (RPM)	13
New Zealand Albums (RMNZ)	15
US Billboard 200	1

== Certifications ==
Region	Certification	Certified units/sales
United States (RIAA)	2× Platinum	2,000,000^{^}
^{^} Shipments figures based on certification alone.
