= With Your Love =

- Side A of the US single

Single by Jefferson Starship

from the album Spitfire
- B-side: "Switchblade"
- Released: July 24, 1976
- Genre: Rock, soft rock
- Label: Grunt/RCA Records
- Songwriters: Marty Balin, Joey Covington, Vic Smith
- Producers: Jefferson Starship and Larry Cox

Jefferson Starship singles chronology
"Play on Love" (1976)	"With Your Love" (1976)	"St. Charles" (1976)

"With Your Love" is a song written by Marty Balin, Joey Covington and Vic Smith. The song was first recorded by Jefferson Starship and was the lead single of their 1976 album Spitfire. In the US, the single peaked at number 12 on the Billboard Hot 100 and number 6 on the Adult Contemporary chart. It was also a top-ten hit in Canada.

== Reception ==
Cash Box said that "it's a hook-filled ballad, Balin's vocal is packed with emotion and the arrangement has some healthy jazz influences readily apparent" with "great answering backup vocals on the chorus."

== Chart performance ==
=== Weekly charts ===
Chart (1976)	Peak position
Canada Top Singles (RPM)	10
Canada RPM Adult Contemporary	6
US Billboard Hot 100	12
US Adult Contemporary (Billboard)	6

=== Year-end charts ===
Chart (1976)	Rank
Canada	111
U.S. Billboard Hot 100	84

== Cover versions ==
- Balin released a new version on his 1999 solo album, Marty Balin Greatest Hits.
