= Volunteers (song) =

1969 song by Jefferson Airplane

Single by Jefferson Airplane

from the album Volunteers
- B-side: "We Can Be Together"
- Released: October 1969
- Recorded: April 1969
- Studio: Wally Heider Studios, San Francisco, California
- Genre: Hard rock
- Length: 2:03
- Label: RCA Victor
- Songwriters: Marty Balin; Paul Kantner
- Producer: Al Schmitt

Jefferson Airplane singles chronology
"Plastic Fantastic Lover" (1969)	"Volunteers" (1969)	"Mexico" (1970)

"Volunteers" is a Jefferson Airplane single from 1969 that was released to promote the album Volunteers two months before the album's release. It was written by Marty Balin and Paul Kantner. Balin was woken up by a truck one morning, which happened to be a truck with Volunteers of America painted on the side. Balin started writing lyrics down and then asked Kantner to help him with the music. The music is similar to that of the single's b-side "We Can Be Together" and was based on a bluegrass riff that David Crosby had shown Kantner. "Volunteers" also has a similar chord structure and rhythm to "We Can Be Together".

Toronto Daily Star critic Jack Batten used the following lyrics as an example of how many then-current pop songs "constitute documents as inflammatory and subversive as any anarchist's blueprint for civil war", except that there is nothing hidden. But Kantner said that "'Volunteers' is not political, outlaws aren't political. That's what the song is about...I don't get involved with crazy revolutionaries. They're spending all their time being paranoid when they could be out on the West Coast enjoying themselves, getting high, meeting lotsa people and ignoring it all."

Cash Box said that the song's "lyric and more rock-based drive" provide "a commercial drive", and compared it to the Buffalo Springfield song "For What It's Worth". Record World called it "an instant smash." Boston Globe critic Ernie Santosuosso described it as a song that "will stick in your consciousness."

Allmusic critic Matthew Greenwald said " It's a heavy rocker, and one of the Airplane's finest – and easily most underrated – singles. Ultimate Classic Rock critic Michael Gallucci rated it Jefferson Airplane's 3rd best song, calling it one of the band's "most aggressive tracks and a rousing anthem for the more revolutionary arm of Woodstock nation."

Jefferson Airplane performed the song at the original Woodstock Festival and that performance was included on the album Woodstock: Music from the Original Soundtrack and More.

== Chart performance ==
Chart (1969–70)	Peak position
US Billboard Hot 100	65

== Personnel ==
- Grace Slick – piano, vocals
- Marty Balin – guitar, lead vocals
- Paul Kantner – rhythm guitar, vocals
- Jorma Kaukonen – lead guitar
- Jack Casady – bass
- Spencer Dryden – drums, percussion

=== Additional personnel ===
- Nicky Hopkins – piano

== Cover versions ==
- Balin released a new version on his 1991 solo album, Better Generation.
