= Jesse Barish =

American musician

Jesse Barish is an American musician and composer, most notable for writing the song "Count on Me" for Jefferson Starship; and several songs for Marty Balin, the former lead vocalist of Jefferson Starship, including: "Hearts", "Atlanta Lady (Something About Your Love)" and "Do It for Love".

He played flute with the seminal experimental band The Orkustra in San Francisco in the mid-1960s, and with John Phillips on Phillips' Wolf King of L.A. tour. In 1971, Barish was signed to Shelter Records by Denny Cordell and released the album Jesse, Wolff and Whings with guitarist Billy Wolff and drummer Kevin Kelley, who played with The Byrds and Rising Sons.

Landing in Marin County, California, in the early 1970s, Barish became friends with Marty Balin who recorded "Count on Me" with Jefferson Starship and in 1981 had a hit with the song "Hearts" on Balin's first solo release Balin on EMI America Records. Balin got Barish signed to RCA Records in the late 1970s and produced his first album Jesse Barish, then co-produced the second album Mercury Shoes with John Hug.

Since then Barish has been living in Venice, California, recorded several albums produced by Jeff Pescetto, and continues to write songs and stay active in the world of music.

As the protégé to Marty Balin in the 1970s, they co produced music together after Balin split with Jefferson Starship to go solo. In 1981, Barish wrote the song "Hearts" for him to perform for his new album. The song became popular and has been covered by numerous musicians. Later in 2008, this song was released on Jesse Barish's album "Farther Sun", with an intimate acoustic guitar instrumentation compared to Balin's.

Jesse Barish's album Flute Salad has a new age musical feel, and was done in collaboration with Jeff Pescetto and licensed through Void Echo Records. The album features Barish on flute, alto flute and bass flute, with Pescetto playing other instruments.

== Discography ==
- Jesse Barish
- Mercury Shoes
- Cherry Road
- Selling Fire in July
- Nine Days from Nowhere
- Farther Sun
- Restless Soul
- Flute Salad
- Wheel Keep Turning

=== Songs written for Marty Balin ===
(Non-collaborative songs only)

- 1976 "Love Lovely Love" – Spitfire
- 1978 "Count on Me" – Earth
- 1978 "Crazy Feelin'" – Earth
- 1981 "Hearts" – Balin
- 1981 "Atlanta Lady (Something About Your Love)" – Balin
- 1981 "Music Is the Light" – Balin
- 1983 "Do It for Love" – Lucky
- 1991 "See the Light" – (Marty Balin original solo version) – Better Generation
- 1999 "See the Light" – (Jefferson Starship re-recorded version) – Windows of Heaven
- 1999 "Ways of Love" – Windows of Heaven
