= Hearts (song) =

Single by Marty Balin

from the album Balin
- B-side: "Freeway"
- Released: May 1981
- Recorded: 1981
- Genre: Soft rock
- Length: 4:32 (album version); 3:54 (single version)
- Label: EMI America
- Songwriter: Jesse Barish
- Producer: John Hug

Marty Balin singles chronology
"You Are the One" (1962)	"Hearts" (1981)	"Atlanta Lady (Something About Your Love)" (1981)

"Hearts" is a song written by Jesse Barish and performed by Marty Balin in 1981, included on his debut solo album Balin. It was Balin's third single in nineteen years (after his distant and unsuccessful songs "Nobody but You" and "I Specialize in Love"/"You Are the One" of 1962) and the biggest hit of his solo career.

It reached number 8 on the Billboard Hot 100, number 9 on the U.S. adult contemporary chart, and number 20 on the U.S. rock chart in 1981.

The song was produced by John Hug.

The single ranked number 41 on the Billboard Year-End Hot 100 singles of 1981.

A music video was also made and produced for the song, which takes place on Alcatraz Island in San Francisco. The video also contains shots of the Golden Gate Bridge.

== Chart history ==
=== Weekly charts ===
Chart (1981–82)	Peak position
Canada RPM Adult Contemporary	4
Canada RPM Top Singles	11
France (IFOP)	19
U.S. Billboard Hot 100	8
U.S. Billboard Adult Contemporary	9
U.S. Billboard Top Rock Tracks	20
U.S. Cash Box Top 100	9

=== Year-end charts ===
Chart (1981)	Rank
US Billboard Hot 100	41
US Cash Box	56

== Spanish version ==
Several official 7" single pressings for Spain and other Spanish-speaking markets were issued in 1981 that list Marty Balin’s hit under the Spanish title "Corazones" (sometimes shown on the label alongside the English title "Hearts"). These pressings were released on EMI local imprints (for example EMI-Odeon in Spain) and retain the original B-side "Freeway". Discogs documents multiple country pressings with the Spanish title (Spain, Mexico and other Latin American pressings).

== Cover versions ==
- James Last released a version of the song on his 1981 album, Non Stop Dancing '82 – Hits Around the World.
- Dalida released a version of the song in France entitled "Nostalgie" on her 1982 album, Spécial Dalida.
- Sydne Rome released a version in 1982.
- Seija Simola released a version of the song in Finland entitled "Tunne" on her 1984 album, Tunteet.
- Marina Lima released a version of the song on her 1987 album, Virgem.
- Jefferson Starship released a live version on their 2001 album, Across the Sea of Suns.
- Philipp Kirkorov released a version of the song in Russia entitled "Сердце Ждёт" on her 2012 album, Сердце Ждёт.
- The Scarlet on their 1997 album Still First which would later be included in the Dancemania Covers Vol. 2 compilation

== Uses ==
- The Spanish-version of the song called "Corazones" was used as the opening theme for the RCTV Venezuelan telenovela "La hija de nadie", which first aired in November 1981.
