= Atlanta Lady (Something About Your Love) =

Single by Marty Balin

from the album Balin
- B-side: "Lydia!"
- Released: August 1981
- Genre: Pop rock
- Length: 3:27
- Label: EMI America
- Songwriter(s): Jesse Barish
- Producer(s): John Hug

Marty Balin singles chronology
"Hearts" (1981)	"Atlanta Lady (Something About Your Love)" (1981)	"What Love Is" (1983)

"Atlanta Lady (Something About Your Love)" is a song written by Jesse Barish and performed by Marty Balin. It reached #11 on the U.S. adult contemporary chart and #27 on the Billboard Hot 100 in 1981. The song was on his 1981 album, Balin.

The song was produced by John Hug.
