= Miracles (Jefferson Starship song) =

- Cover of the Spanish single (FB-10367)

Single by Jefferson Starship

from the album Red Octopus
- B-side: "Ai Garimasu (There Is Love)"
- Released: August 1975
- Recorded: February 1975
- Genre: Soft rock
- Length: 6:52 (Album version); 3:25 (Single version)
- Label: Grunt/RCA Records
- Songwriter: Marty Balin
- Producers: Jefferson Starship and Larry Cox

Jefferson Starship singles chronology
"Ride the Tiger" (1974)	"Miracles" (1975)	"Play on Love" (1976)

"Miracles" is a song written by Marty Balin and originally recorded by Jefferson Starship, appearing on its 1975 album Red Octopus.

"Miracles" peaked at number 3 for three weeks on the Billboard Hot 100, making it the highest-charting single the band ever recorded under the name Jefferson Starship or its previous incarnation Jefferson Airplane.

== Background and writing ==
The song was inspired in part by the Indian guru Sathya Sai Baba, whose followers believe him to have been a miracle worker. It was also inspired in part by a woman Balin was in love with at the time. According to Jeff Tamarkin's book Got a Revolution! The Turbulent Flight of Jefferson Airplane, Balin labored over the song "for some time" and "slowly but deliberately crafted" it. However, author Robert Yehling has written that Balin wrote the song in 30 minutes or wrote the lyrics in 45 minutes. According to Balin, when he presented the song to the rest of the band members, "Everybody went, 'I don't know about that. That's pretty weird, man.' I was really worried; nobody liked it. But I told myself, after about five days, 'Maybe they're wrong.'"

To secure more radio airplay for the song, the full-length album version of "Miracles" (6 minutes, 52 seconds long) was cut by more than half its length for the single, which runs 3 minutes, 25 seconds. This edit was done not only for length, but to remove the sexual reference in the line "I had a taste of the real world when I went down on you, girl."

== Critical reception ==
Commenting on the band's recording of "Miracles", Jeff Tamarkin wrote: "[Larry] Cox nailed the production -- there isn't a wasted, out of place note. Strings glisten, the keyboard sound is contemporary and Grace [Slick] and Paul [Kantner]'s harmonies are relatively traditional. [David] Freiberg came up with the memorable signature organ riff that opens the song and Craig [Chaquico] with a fresh supply of delicious guitar sounds. Marty is at his most open, crooning his words of love like he hasn't in years -- without a hint of irony or awkwardness he uses the word 'baby' at least 25 times ...."

Upon the single's release, Billboard magazine listed "Miracles" among its Top Single Picks, indicating that the review panel predicted it to reach the top 30 of the Hot 100. The magazine commented, "With a top 10 LP under their belts, the rejuvenated Starship (with Marty Balin back as a full fledged member) come up with the kind of easy rocker that highlighted the early Airplane days. Vocal interchanges between Balin and Grace Slick the high point of the record." Cash Box said it is "a fine, well-orchestrated love ballad in the Airplane tradition" and "some of their most appealing, well-produced material in years."

Reviewing a Balin solo concert in 1981, New York Times critic Stephen Holden referred to "Miracles" as Balin's "little masterpiece of pop pillow talk".

Dave Marsh and James Bernard listed "Miracles" among the "Best Songs to Pass the Censor" in The New Book of Rock Lists. In the same book, they also described "I had a taste of the real world / When I went down on you, girl" as the "Most Off-Color Line in the LP Version of a Number One Hit" (although "Miracles" did not, in fact, hit #1).

In 1998, Balin received a plaque from Broadcast Music Incorporated, a performing rights organization which monitors music performances on radio and elsewhere, recognizing that "Miracles" had achieved 2 million performances.

William Ruhlmann, writing in All Music Guide Required Listening: Classic Rock, commented, "[T]here can be little doubt that it was Balin's irresistible ballad 'Miracles,' the biggest hit single in the Jefferson Whatever catalog, that propelled Red Octopus to the top of the charts .... This must have been sweet vindication for Balin, who founded Jefferson Airplane but then drifted away from the group as it veered away from his musical vision. Now, the collective was incorporating his taste without quite integrating it -- 'Miracles,' with its strings and sax solo by nonband member Irv Cox, was hardly a characteristic Airplane/Starship track."

The New Rolling Stone Album Guide, published in 2004, stated that "with Marty Balin's 'Miracles,' Octopus′s massive hit, the band began shifting toward schmaltz. Balin now sounded like a lounge singer ...."

Philip Dodd, in The Book of Rock: From the 1950s to Today, described "Miracles" as "magnificent".

== Soundtracks ==
The song has been featured in the films The Family Stone (2005), Crank (2006), and the TV series Supernatural (Season 6, Episode 19, 2011).

== Personnel ==
- Marty Balin – lead and backing vocals
- Grace Slick – backing vocals
- Paul Kantner – backing vocals, rhythm guitar
- Craig Chaquico – lead guitar, backing vocals
- Papa John Creach – electric violin
- David Freiberg – organ, backing vocals
- Pete Sears – bass, electric piano, backing vocals
- John Barbata – drums, percussion, backing vocals

Additional personnel

- Bobbye Hall – percussion, congas
- Irv Cox – saxophone

== Chart performance ==
=== Weekly charts ===
Chart (1975)	Peak position
Canada RPM Top Singles	22
New Zealand (Recorded Music NZ)	40
US Billboard Hot 100	3
US Easy Listening	17
US Cash Box Top 100	4

=== Year-end charts ===
Chart (1975)	Rank
Canada	86
US Cash Box	41

== Cover versions ==
- Balin released a new version on his 1999 solo album, Marty Balin Greatest Hits.
