= Marty Balin =

American singer, songwriter, and musician (1942–2018)

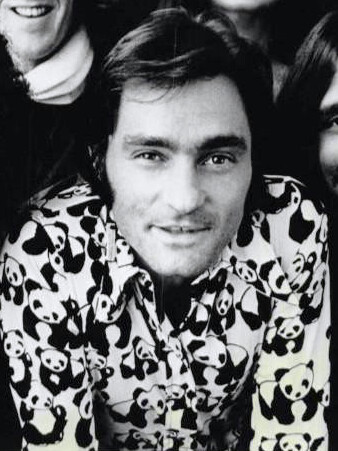
- Balin in 1976 with Jefferson Starship

Background information
- Born: Martyn Jerel Buchwald; January 30, 1942; Cincinnati, Ohio, U.S.
- Died: September 27, 2018 (aged 76) Tampa, Florida, U.S.
- Genres: Psychedelic rock, folk rock, pop rock, soft rock, acid rock
- Occupations: Musician, singer-songwriter
- Instruments: Vocals, guitar, bass guitar
- Years active: 1962–2016
- Labels: Challenge, EMI, RCA Victor, Grunt Records, GWE
- Formerly of: Jefferson Airplane, KBC Band, Jefferson Starship, Bodacious D.F.

Martyn Jerel Buchwald (January 30, 1942 – September 27, 2018), known as Marty Balin (/ˈbælɪn/), was an American singer, songwriter, and musician best known as a member of Jefferson Airplane and Jefferson Starship.

== Early life ==
Balin was born Martyn Jerel Buchwald in Cincinnati, Ohio, the son of Catherine Eugenia "Jean" (née Talbot) and Joseph Buchwald. His paternal grandparents emigrated from Eastern Europe. His father was Jewish and his mother was Episcopalian. Balin attended Washington High School in San Francisco, California. As a child, Balin was diagnosed with autism.

== Career ==
=== Early musical work ===
In 1962, Buchwald changed his name to Marty Balin and began recording with Challenge Records in Los Angeles, releasing the singles "Nobody But You" and "I Specialize in Love". By 1964, Balin was leading a folk music quartet named The Town Criers.

=== Jefferson Airplane ===
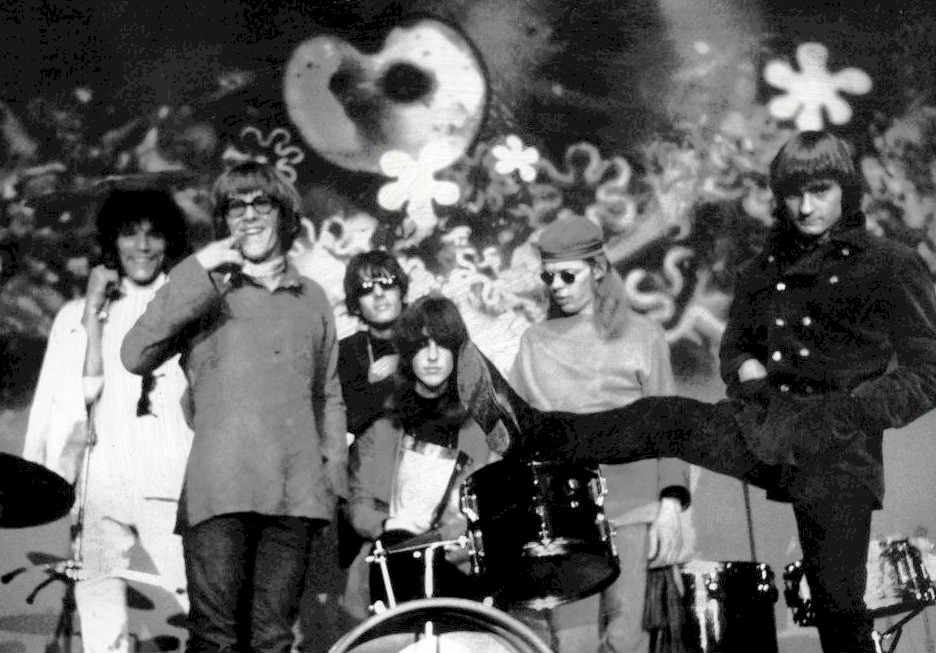
Balin (far right) with Jefferson Airplane

Balin was the primary founder of Jefferson Airplane, which he "launched" from a restaurant-turned-club he created and named The Matrix, and was also one of its lead vocalists and songwriters from 1965 to 1971. In the group's 1966–1971 iteration, Balin served as co-lead vocalist alongside Grace Slick. Balin's songwriting output diminished after Surrealistic Pillow (1967) as Slick, Paul Kantner and Jorma Kaukonen matured as songwriters, a process compounded by personality clashes. Balin's most enduring songwriting contributions were often imbued with a romantic, pop-oriented lilt that was atypical of the band's characteristic forays into psychedelic rock. Among Balin's most notable songs were "Comin' Back to Me" (a folk rock ballad later covered by Ritchie Havens and Rickie Lee Jones), "Today" (a collaboration with Kantner initially written on spec for Tony Bennett that was prominently covered by Tom Scott) and again with Kantner, the topical 1969 top-100 hit "Volunteers". Although uncharacteristic of his oeuvre, the uptempo "3/5 of a Mile in 10 Seconds" and "Plastic Fantastic Lover" (both written for Surrealistic Pillow) remained integral components of the Airplane's live set throughout the late 1960s.

Balin played with Jefferson Airplane at the Monterey Pop Festival in 1967 and at the Woodstock Festival in 1969.

In December 1969, Balin was knocked unconscious by members of the Hells Angels motorcycle club while performing during the infamous Altamont Free Concert as seen in the 1970 documentary film Gimme Shelter. In April 1971, he formally departed Jefferson Airplane after breaking off all communication with his bandmates following the completion of their autumn 1970 American tour. He elaborated on this decision in a 1993 interview with Jeff Tamarkin of Relix:

I don't know, just Janis's death. That struck me. It was dark times. Everybody was doing so much drugs and I couldn't even talk to the band. I was into yoga at the time. I'd given up drinking and I was into totally different area[s], health foods and getting back to the streets, working with the American Indians. It was getting strange for me. Cocaine was a big deal in those days and I wasn't a cokie and I couldn't talk with everybody who had an answer for every goddamn thing, rationalizing everything that happened. I thought it made the music really tight and constrictive and ruined it. So after Janis died, I thought, I'm not gonna go onstage and play that kind of music, I don't like cocaine.

Balin remained active in the San Francisco Bay Area rock scene, managing and producing an album for the Berkeley-based sextet Grootna before briefly joining funk-inflected hard rock ensemble Bodacious DF as lead vocalist on their eponymous 1973 debut album. The following year, Kantner asked Balin to write a song for his new Airplane offshoot group, Jefferson Starship. Together, they wrote the early power ballad "Caroline", which appeared on the album Dragon Fly with Balin as guest lead vocalist.

=== Jefferson Starship ===
Rejoining the team he had helped to establish, Balin became a permanent member of Jefferson Starship in 1975 and over the next three years, he contributed to and sang lead on four top-20 hits, including "Miracles" (No. 3, a Balin original), "With Your Love" (No. 12, a collaboration between Balin, former Jefferson Airplane drummer Joey Covington and former Grootna/Bodacious DF lead guitarist Vic Smith), Jesse Barish's "Count on Me" (No. 8), and N. Q. Dewey's "Runaway" (No. 12). Ultimately, Balin's relationship with the band was beleaguered by interpersonal problems and his own reluctance toward live performances. He abruptly left the group in October 1978 shortly after Slick's departure from the band.

=== Solo work, and reunion projects ===
In 1979, Balin produced a rock opera titled Rock Justice, about a rock star who was put in jail for failing to produce a hit for his record company, based on his experiences with the lawsuits fought for years with former Jefferson Airplane manager Matthew Katz. The cast recording was produced by Balin, but it did not feature him in performance.

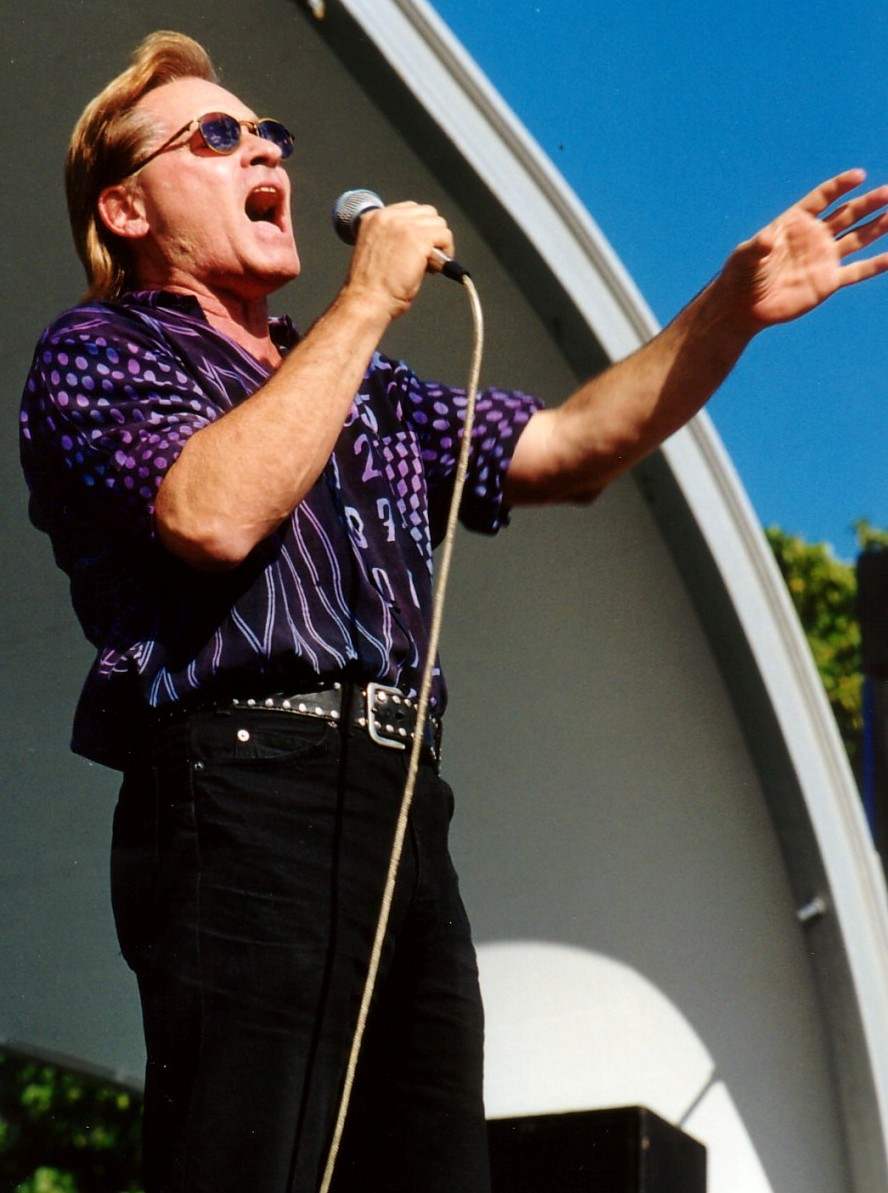
Balin performing at a concert in Hallandale, Florida

Balin continued with EMI as a solo artist and in 1981, he released his first solo album, Balin, featuring two Jesse Barish songs that became top-40 hits, "Hearts" (#8) and "Atlanta Lady (Something About Your Love)" (#27). In 1983, Balin released a second solo album, Lucky, along with a Japan-only EP produced by EMI called There's No Shoulder. Balin's contract with EMI ended shortly thereafter.

In 1985, he teamed with former Jefferson Airplane members Paul Kantner and Jack Casady to form the KBC Band. After the breakup of the KBC band, a 1989 reunion album and tour with Jefferson Airplane followed.

Balin continued recording solo albums in the years following the reunion, and reunited with Kantner in the latest incarnation of Jefferson Starship.

Balin had intended to record lead vocals for two tracks for Jefferson Starship's album Jefferson's Tree of Liberty. However, his art touring schedule conflicted with studio sessions, and instead, the track "Maybe for You", from the German release of Windows of Heaven, was included.

On July 2, 2007, the music-publishing firm Bicycle Music, Inc. announced that it had acquired an interest in songs written or performed by Balin, including hits from his days with Jefferson Airplane and Jefferson Starship.

== Honors ==
Balin, along with the other members of the 1966–1970 line-up of Jefferson Airplane, was inducted into the Rock and Roll Hall of Fame in 1996. As a member of Jefferson Airplane, he was honored with a Grammy Lifetime Achievement Award in 2016.

== Personal life ==
Balin enjoyed painting all his life. He painted many of the most influential musicians of the last half of the 20th century. Marty Balin's Atelier was located at 130 King Fine Art in Saint Augustine, Florida, Balin's permanent signature collection gallery.

Balin resided in Florida and San Francisco with his wife, Susan Joy Balin, formerly Susan Joy Finkelstein. Balin and Finkelstein had two daughters; Finkelstein also had two daughters from a previous marriage.

Balin married Karen Deal in 1989. She died in 2010.

== Health and death ==
While on tour in March 2016, Balin was taken to Mount Sinai Beth Israel Hospital in New York City after complaining of chest pains. After undergoing open-heart surgery, he was transferred to an intensive-care unit to spend time recovering. In a subsequent lawsuit, Balin alleged that neglect and inadequate care facilities on the hospital's part had resulted in a paralyzed vocal cord, loss of his left thumb and half of his tongue, bedsores, and kidney damage.

Balin died at his home in Tampa on September 27, 2018, at the age of 76.

== Discography ==
- Balin (1981)
- Lucky (1983)
- There's No Shoulder (1983) (EP, Japan only)
- Better Generation (1991)
- Freedom Flight (1997)
- Marty Balin Greatest Hits (1999) (new recordings)
- Marty Balin (2003)
- Nashville Sessions (2008)
- Time for Every Season (2009)
- Blue Highway (2010)
- The Witcher (2011)
- Good Memories (2015)
- The Greatest Love (2016)

with Bodacious DF

- Bodacious DF (1973)

with KBC Band

- KBC Band (1986)

compilations

- Balince (1990)
- Wish I Were (1995) (Europe only)
- Mercy of the Moon: The Best of Marty Balin (2009)
- Nothin' 2 Lose: The Lost Studio Recordings (2009)
- 415 Music: Rare Studio & Live Recordings 1980–82 (2011)

=== Solo singles ===
Year	Title	Peak chart positions			Record Label	B-side	Album
Year	Title	US	AC	Rock	Record Label	B-side	Album
1962	"Nobody but You"	—	—	—	Challenge Records	"You Made Me Fall"	
1962	"You Are the One"	—	—	—	Challenge Records	"I Specialize in Love"	
1981	"Hearts"	8	9	20	EMI America Records	"Freeway"	Balin
1981	"Atlanta Lady (Something About Your Love)"	27	11	—	EMI America Records	"Lydia!"	Balin
1983	"What Love Is"	63	—	—	EMI America Records	"Heart of Stone"	Lucky
1983	"Do It for Love"	102	17	—	EMI America Records	"Will You Forever"	Lucky

Other appearances

Year	Album/single	Artist	Comment
1972	Grootna	Grootna	producer
1977	Goodbye Blues	Country Joe McDonald	vocals on "Blood on the Ice"
1978	Jesse Barish	Jesse Barish	producer, vocals
1980	Mercury Shoes	Jesse Barish	producer, vocals
1980	Rock Justice	Various artists	producer, co-writer
1993	Ships in the Forest	Kerry Kearney	vocals on "Love Me Slow"
1994	Then And Now, Vol. 1	Various artists	vocals on "It's No Secret" & "Summer of Love"
1994	Then And Now, Vol. 2	Various artists	vocals & guitar on "Always Tomorrow" & "Summer of Love"
2010	"Summer Rain"	Brian Chris Band	cameo in music video
2011	"In the Sun"	The Producers Heart and Soul	vocals
2011	"Let's Go"	The Producers Heart and Soul	vocals
