= List of Jefferson Starship members =

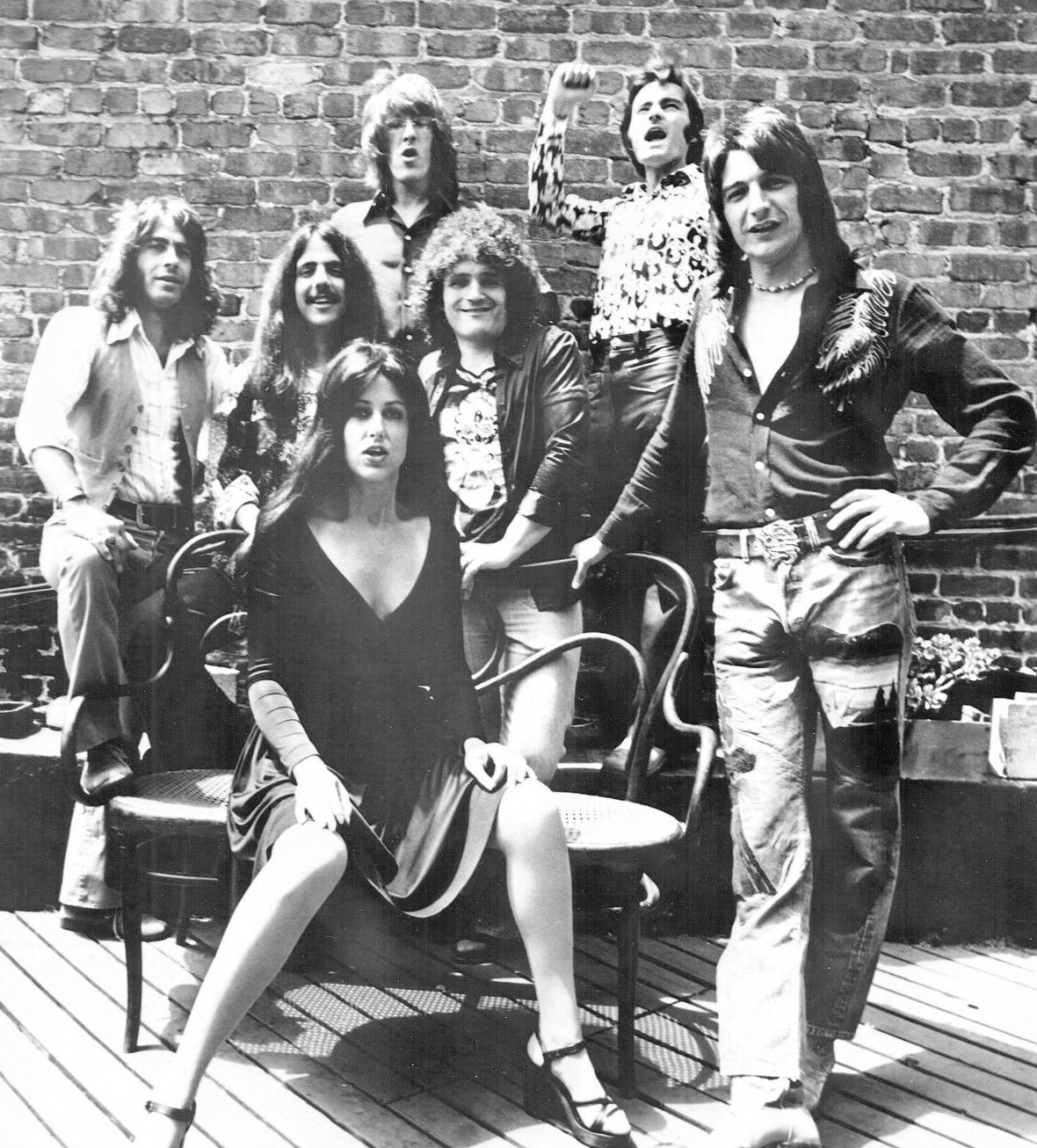
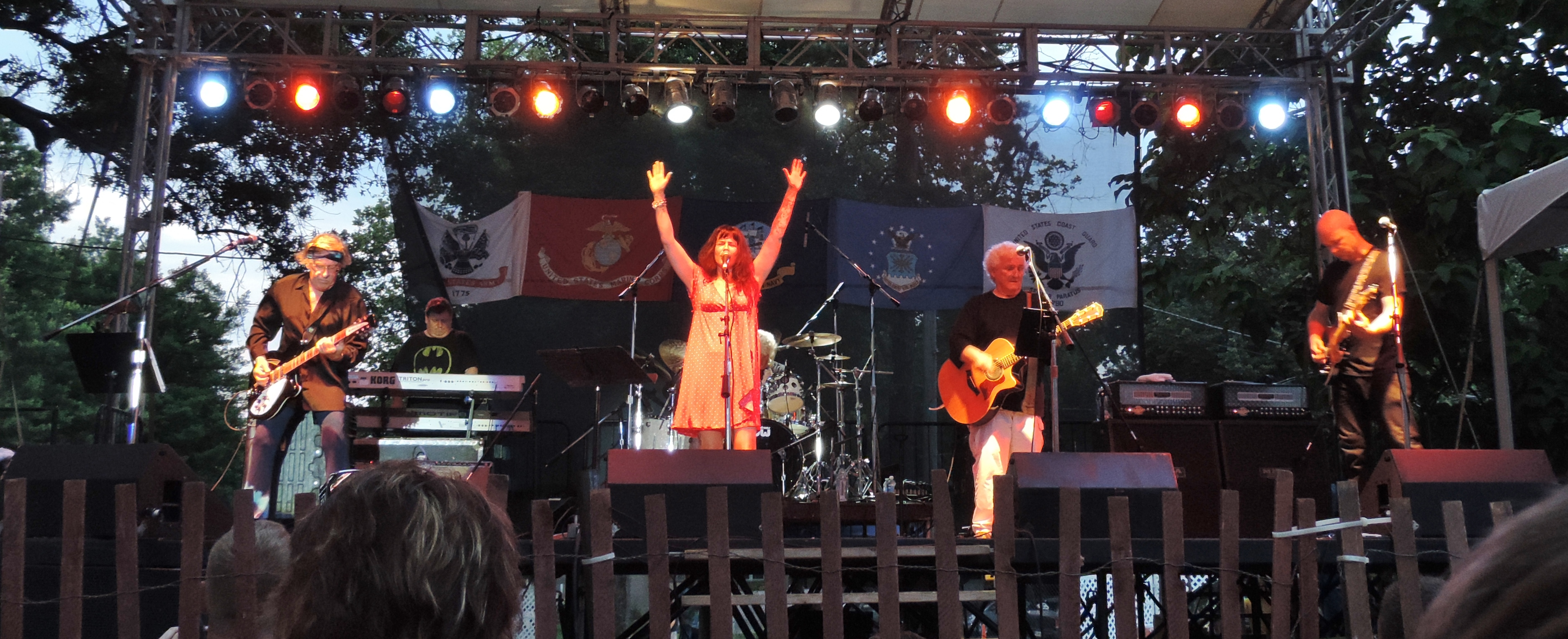
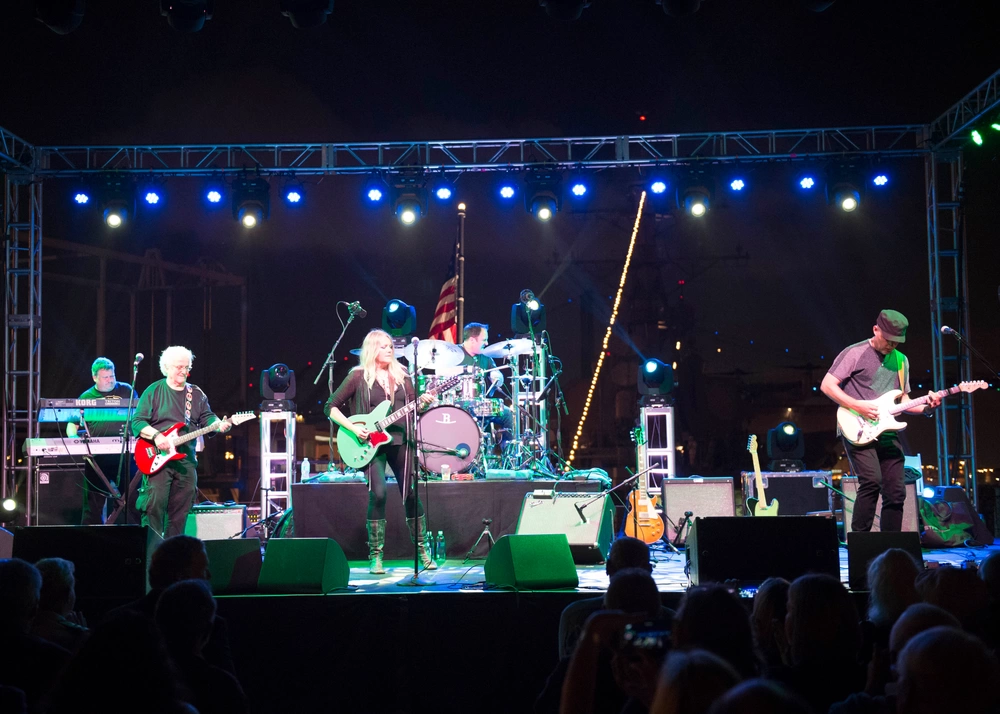
Three lineups of Jefferson Starship in 1976, 2013 and 2016.

Jefferson Starship is an American rock band from San Francisco, California that developed in January 1974 as a successor to Jefferson Airplane.

== History ==
The group initially featured the five remaining members of Jefferson Airplane, Grace Slick (vocals, piano), Paul Kantner (rhythm guitar, vocals), David Freiberg (bass, keyboards, vocals), Papa John Creach (violin), and John Barbata (drums, vocals); in addition to new members Craig Chaquico on lead guitar and Peter Kaukonen (brother of Jorma Kaukonen) on bass. The name "Jefferson Starship" was originally used on the co-billing of the 1970 Paul Kantner album, Blows Against the Empire, and was selected as the name for the revised band. After the band's first tour, Kaukonen was replaced by Pete Sears (bass, keyboards) in June 1974. Former Airplane vocalist Marty Balin joined the band in January 1975, having co-written and performed on the song "Caroline". Creach left in August 1975 to start a solo career. The band's lineup remained stable until June 1978, when Slick left the band after being asked to resign by Kantner, following a show in Germany in which she drank excessively and abused the crowd. Balin also departed the band after the end of the touring cycle for Earth. Additionally, Barbata dropped out after he was seriously injured in a car accident which left him unable to perform.

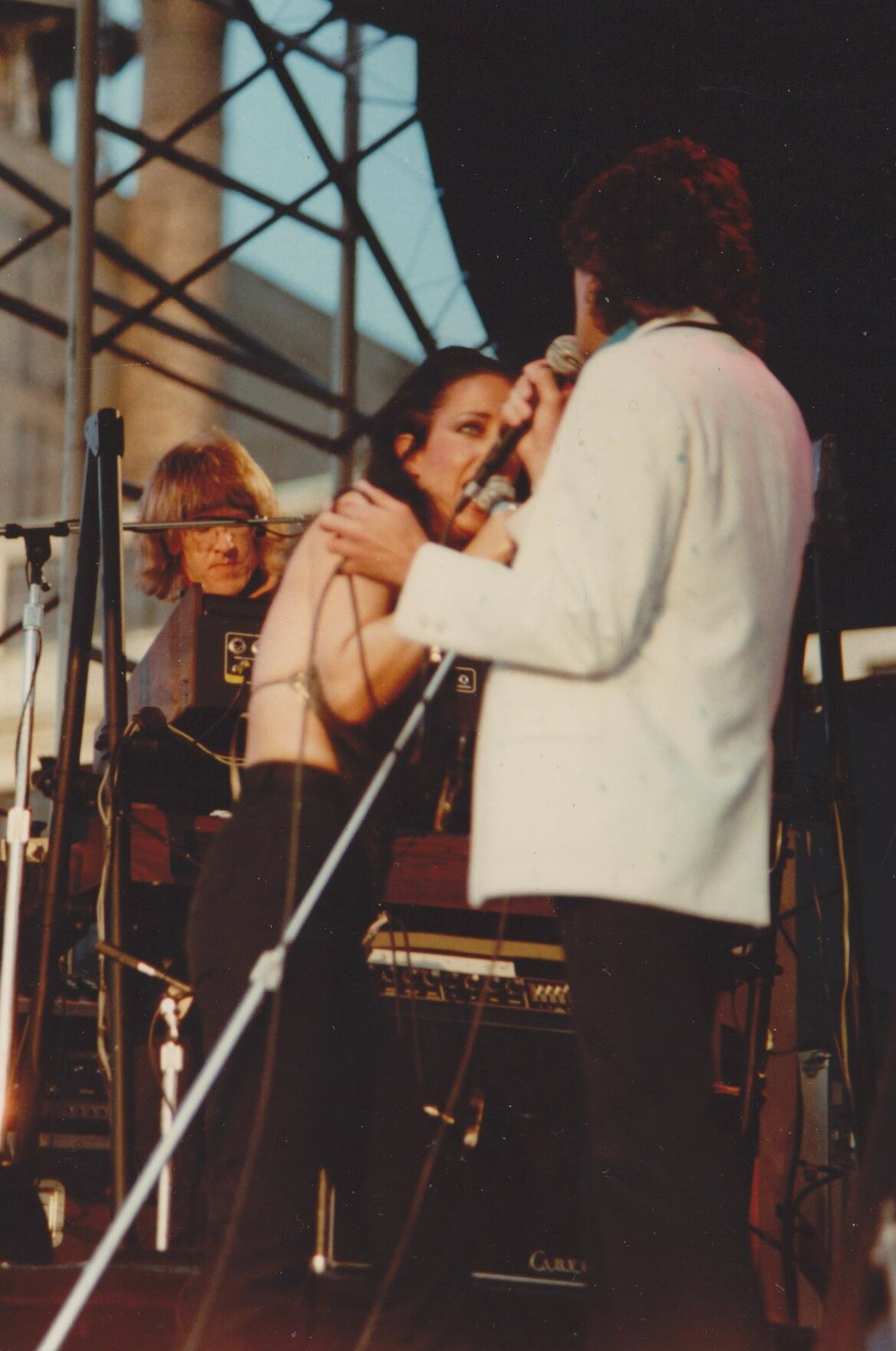
Grace Slick, Paul Kantner and Mickey Thomas of Jefferson Starship, NYC, 1981 Pier 84

The remaining members of Jefferson Starship rebuilt the band in early 1979, adding drummer Aynsley Dunbar in January and vocalist Mickey Thomas in April. Slick returned to the band in 1981, after performing guest backing vocals on Modern Times. Dunbar was asked by Kantner to leave in 1982, with Donny Baldwin taking his place in September. Shortly after the band released Nuclear Furniture, Kantner left Jefferson Starship and later sued the remaining members of the band in October 1984 over ownership of the name; the lawsuit was settled in March 1985, with the name Jefferson Starship retired and the remaining band members continuing as simply Starship.

In January 1992, Kantner reformed Jefferson Starship with former KBC Band bandmates Mark "Slick" Aguilar (lead guitar) and Tim Gorman (keyboards, vocals), former Jefferson Airplane bandmate Jack Casady (bass) and Jefferson Starship bandmate Creach, and new members Darby Gould (vocals) and Prairie Prince (drums). Diana Mangano joined the following October and initially shared vocal duties, before becoming an official member of the band when Gould departed in 1995. Balin also rejoined the band in 1993. Creach died on February 22, 1994. Kaukonen returned briefly in 1994, and Gorman left around the same time; he was replaced first by Barry Flast, then by Gary Cambra, and finally by Terry "T" Lavitz. Chris Smith took over on keyboards in 1998. Casady left in 2000 and was replaced until 2004 by Tom Lilly.

Jefferson Starship returned with new studio album Jefferson's Tree of Liberty in 2008, which was the first by the band to feature vocalist Cathy Richardson, who had recently replaced Mangano, and the first since 1984's Nuclear Furniture to feature returning frontman Freiberg, who replaced Balin. Baldwin returned to the band after the album's release, replacing the departing Prince. In September 2012, Jude Gold took over from Aguilar who was forced to cease activity with the band after being diagnosed with hepatitis C. Richardson briefly left in November 2015, with Rachel Rose taking her place, before returning in March the following year. On January 28, 2016, Kantner, the only constant member of Jefferson Airplane and Jefferson Starship, died of multiple organ failure and septic shock following a heart attack a few days earlier. Since 2016, the lineup consists of Freiberg (vocals and acoustic guitar), Donny Baldwin (drums and backing vocals), Chris Smith (keyboards and bass), Cathy Richardson (vocals and rhythm guitar), and Jude Gold (lead guitar and backing vocals).

== Members ==
=== Current ===
Image	Name	Years active	Instruments	Release contributions
	David Freiberg	1974–1984; 2005–present	lead and backing vocals; acoustic guitar (since 2005); keyboards and bass (1974–1984)	all Jefferson Starship releases from Dragon Fly (1974) to Nuclear Furniture (1984); Jefferson's Tree of Liberty (2008); Mother of the Sun (2020)
	Donny Baldwin	1982–1984; 2008–present	drums; percussion; backing vocals	Nuclear Furniture (1984); Mother of the Sun (2020)
	Chris Smith	1998–present	keyboards; synthesizers; piano; bass (since 2000)	Greatest Hits: Live at the Fillmore (1999); Across the Sea of Suns (2001); Jefferson's Tree of Liberty (2008); Mother of the Sun (2020)
	Cathy Richardson	2008–2015; 2016–present	lead and backing vocals; rhythm guitar; harmonica	Jefferson's Tree of Liberty (2008); Mother of the Sun (2020)
	Jude Gold	2012–present	lead and rhythm guitars; backing vocals	Mother of the Sun (2020)

=== Former ===
Image	Name	Years active	Instruments	Release contributions
	Paul Kantner	1974–1984; 1992–2016 (until his death)	rhythm guitar; banjo; harmonica; synthesizers; lead and backing vocals	all Jefferson Starship releases through Jefferson's Tree of Liberty (2008)
	Craig Chaquico	1974–1984	lead and rhythm guitars; backing vocals	all Jefferson Starship releases from Dragon Fly (1974) to Nuclear Furniture (1984)
	Grace Slick	1974–1978; 1981–1984	lead and backing vocals; piano; keyboards	all Jefferson Starship releases from Dragon Fly (1974) to Nuclear Furniture (1984), except Freedom at Point Zero (1979)
	John Barbata	1974–1979 (died 2024)	drums; percussion; backing and occasional lead vocals	all Jefferson Starship releases from Dragon Fly (1974) to Earth (1978)
	Papa John Creach	1974–1975; 1992–1994 (until his death) (guest in 1978)	violin	Dragon Fly (1974); Red Octopus (1975)
	Peter Kaukonen	1974; 1994–1995 (touring 2006)	bass	none
	Pete Sears	1974–1984 (touring 2005, guest in 2009 and 2016, session guest 2020)	bass; keyboards; backing vocals	all Jefferson Starship releases from Dragon Fly (1974) to Nuclear Furniture (1984), guest appearance on Mother of the Sun (2020) - three tracks only
	Marty Balin	1975–1978; 1993–2008 (died 2018)	lead and backing vocals; percussion; acoustic guitar (1993–2008); lead and backing vocals (1975–1978)	all Jefferson Starship releases from Dragon Fly (1974) to Earth (1978), and from Deep Space/Virgin Sky (1995) to Jefferson's Tree of Liberty (2008)
	Mickey Thomas	1979–1984	lead and backing vocals	all Jefferson Starship releases from Freedom at Point Zero (1979) to Nuclear Furniture (1984)
	Aynsley Dunbar	1979–1982	drums; percussion	Freedom at Point Zero (1979); Modern Times (1981); Winds of Change (1982)
	Mark "Slick" Aguilar	1992–2012	lead and rhythm guitars; backing vocals	all Jefferson Starship releases from Deep Space/Virgin Sky (1995) to Jefferson's Tree of Liberty (2008)
	Prairie Prince	1992–2008 (guest 2008–16)	drums; percussion	all Jefferson Starship releases from Deep Space/Virgin Sky (1995) to Jefferson's Tree of Liberty (2008)
	Jack Casady	1992–2000	bass	all Jefferson Starship releases from Deep Space/Virgin Sky (1995) to Jefferson's Tree of Liberty (2008), except Across the Sea of Suns (2001)
	Darby Gould	1992–1995 (guest since 2000)	lead and backing vocals	Deep Space/Virgin Sky (1995); Jefferson's Tree of Liberty (2008) – three tracks only
	Tim Gorman	1992–1994 (guest in 2005) (died 2025)	keyboards; backing vocals	Deep Space/Virgin Sky (1995)
	Diana Mangano	1993–2008 (guest 2008–15)	lead and backing vocals	all Jefferson Starship releases from Windows of Heaven (1998) to Jefferson's Tree of Liberty (2008)
	Barry Flast	1994–1995 (died 2013)	keyboards; synthesizers	none
	Gary Cambra	1995–1996	keyboards; synthesizers	none
	Terry "T" Lavitz	1996–1998 (died 2010)	keyboards; synthesizers	Windows of Heaven (1998)
	Rachel Rose	2015–2016 (guest since 2016)	lead and backing vocals	none

=== Touring ===
Image	Name	Years active	Instruments	Details
	Steve Schuster	1978–1980	saxophone	Schuster was a regular member of the Jefferson Starship touring lineup between 1978 and 1980.
	David Farey	1978	horn instruments	Farey toured alongside Schuster with Jefferson Starship after the release of Earth in 1978.
	Signe Toly Anderson	1993–1994 (died 2016)	backing and lead vocals	Anderson, a former member of Jefferson Airplane, made occasional guest appearances in the 1990s.
	Trey Sabatelli	1994–1995; 2004	drums; percussion	Sabatelli occasionally substituted for and performed alongside regular drummer Prairie Prince.
	Bobby Vega	1998–2000	bass	Vega and Huff each spent spells substituting for Jack Casady between 1998 and his 2000 departure.
	Chico Huff	1998–2000	bass	Vega and Huff each spent spells substituting for Jack Casady between 1998 and his 2000 departure.
	Tom Lilly	2000–2003; 2007	bass	After Casady's departure, Lilly regularly appeared on live bass at Jefferson Starship concerts.
	John Ferenzik	2002; 2006; 2008–2015	bass; keyboards; lead guitar	Ferenzik occasionally performed keyboards, as well as lead guitar and bass alongside regular member Chris Smith.
	Michael Eisenstein	2002; 2009; 2011; 2012	12-string acoustic guitar; backing vocals	Eisenstein substituted for Paul Kantner regularly between 2002 and 2012, when he was unable to perform.
	Prof. Louie	2003	keyboards	Prof. Louie, Falzarano, Kearney and Alexander Kantner made occasional substitute and guest appearances.
	Mike Falzarano	2003	rhythm guitar	Prof. Louie, Falzarano, Kearney and Alexander Kantner made occasional substitute and guest appearances.
	Kerry Kearney	2003	rhythm guitar	Prof. Louie, Falzarano, Kearney and Alexander Kantner made occasional substitute and guest appearances.
	Alexander Kantner	2003	rhythm guitar; bass	Prof. Louie, Falzarano, Kearney and Alexander Kantner made occasional substitute and guest appearances.
	China Wing Kantner	1992–present	backing vocals and occasional tambourine	Kantner has made occasional guest appearances.
	Linda Imperial	2005–2007	backing vocals	Imperial, Traylor and Morley each performed with Jefferson Starship at select shows during the 2000s.
	Jack Traylor	2005	rhythm guitar; backing vocals	Imperial, Traylor and Morley each performed with Jefferson Starship at select shows during the 2000s.
	Tony Morley	2006–2016	drums	Imperial, Traylor and Morley each performed with Jefferson Starship at select shows during the 2000s.
	Anne Harris	2008–2016	violin	Harris has made regular live appearances with Jefferson Starship on violin since 2008.

Source: Fenton 2008, p. 104

== Lineups ==
Period	Members	Releases
January – June 1974	Grace Slick – vocals, piano; Paul Kantner – rhythm guitar, vocals; David Freiberg – keyboards, bass, vocals; Craig Chaquico – lead guitar, backing vocals; Peter Kaukonen – bass; John Barbata – drums, backing vocals; Papa John Creach – violin, vocals	none – live performances only
June 1974 – January 1975	Grace Slick – vocals, piano; Paul Kantner – rhythm guitar, vocals; David Freiberg – keyboards, bass, vocals; Craig Chaquico – lead guitar, backing vocals; Pete Sears – bass, keyboards, backing vocals; John Barbata – drums, backing vocals; Papa John Creach – violin, backing vocals	Dragon Fly (1974)
January – August 1975	Marty Balin – vocals; Grace Slick – vocals, piano; Paul Kantner – rhythm guitar, vocals; David Freiberg – keyboards, bass, vocals; Craig Chaquico – lead guitar, backing vocals; Pete Sears – bass, keyboards, backing vocals; John Barbata – drums, backing vocals; Papa John Creach – violin, backing vocals	Red Octopus (1975)
August 1975 – June 1978	Marty Balin – vocals; Grace Slick – vocals, piano; Paul Kantner – rhythm guitar, vocals; David Freiberg – keyboards, bass, vocals; Craig Chaquico – lead guitar, backing vocals; Pete Sears – bass, keyboards, backing vocals; John Barbata – drums, backing vocals	Spitfire (1976); Earth (1978)
June – October 1978	Marty Balin – vocals; Paul Kantner – rhythm guitar, vocals; David Freiberg – keyboards, bass, vocals; Craig Chaquico – lead guitar, backing vocals; Pete Sears – bass, keyboards, backing vocals; John Barbata – drums, backing vocals	none – live performances and single "Light the Sky on Fire" only
October 1978 - January 1979	Paul Kantner – rhythm guitar, vocals; David Freiberg – keyboards, bass, vocals; Craig Chaquico – lead guitar, backing vocals; Pete Sears – bass, keyboards, backing vocals; John Barbata – drums, backing vocals	none
January – April 1979	Paul Kantner – rhythm guitar, vocals; David Freiberg – keyboards, bass, vocals; Craig Chaquico – lead guitar, backing vocals; Pete Sears – bass, keyboards, backing vocals; Aynsley Dunbar – drums, percussion	none – studio rehearsals only
April 1979 – early 1981	Mickey Thomas – vocals; Paul Kantner – rhythm guitar, vocals; David Freiberg – keyboards, bass, vocals; Craig Chaquico – lead guitar, backing vocals; Pete Sears – bass, keyboards, backing vocals; Aynsley Dunbar – drums, percussion	Freedom at Point Zero (1979); Modern Times (1981) – five tracks
Early 1981 – September 1982	Mickey Thomas – vocals; Grace Slick – vocals, piano; Paul Kantner – rhythm guitar, vocals; David Freiberg – keyboards, bass, vocals; Craig Chaquico – lead guitar, backing vocals; Pete Sears – bass, keyboards, backing vocals; Aynsley Dunbar – drums, percussion	Modern Times (1981) – four tracks; Winds of Change (1982)
September 1982 – June 1984	Mickey Thomas – vocals; Grace Slick – vocals, piano; Paul Kantner – rhythm guitar, vocals; David Freiberg – keyboards, bass, vocals; Craig Chaquico – lead guitar, backing vocals; Pete Sears – bass, keyboards, backing vocals; Donny Baldwin – drums, backing vocals	Nuclear Furniture (1984)
Band inactive June 1984 – January 1992
January 1992 – 1993	Darby Gould – vocals; Paul Kantner – rhythm guitar, vocals; Slick Aguilar – lead guitar, backing vocals; Jack Casady – bass, guitar; Tim Gorman – keyboards, backing vocals; Prairie Prince – drums, percussion; Papa John Creach – violin, backing vocals	none – live performances only
1993 – February 1994	Marty Balin – vocals, acoustic guitar; Darby Gould – vocals; Paul Kantner – rhythm guitar, vocals; Slick Aguilar – lead guitar, backing vocals; Jack Casady – bass, guitar; Tim Gorman – keyboards, backing vocals; Prairie Prince – drums, percussion; Papa John Creach – violin, backing vocals	none – live performances only
February 1994 – mid-1995	Marty Balin – vocals, acoustic guitar; Darby Gould – vocals; Paul Kantner – rhythm guitar, vocals; Slick Aguilar – lead guitar, backing vocals; Jack Casady – bass, guitar; Tim Gorman – keyboards, backing vocals; Prairie Prince – drums, percussion	Deep Space/Virgin Sky (1995)
1995	Marty Balin – vocals, acoustic guitar; Diana Mangano – vocals; Paul Kantner – rhythm guitar, vocals; Slick Aguilar – lead guitar, backing vocals; Jack Casady – bass, guitar; Barry Flast – keyboards, synthesizers; Prairie Prince – drums, percussion	none – live performances only
1995–1996	Marty Balin – vocals, acoustic guitar; Diana Mangano – vocals; Paul Kantner – rhythm guitar, vocals; Slick Aguilar – lead guitar, backing vocals; Jack Casady – bass, guitar; Gary Cambra – keyboards, synthesizers; Prairie Prince – drums, percussion	none – live performances only
1996–1998	Marty Balin – vocals, acoustic guitar; Diana Mangano – vocals; Paul Kantner – rhythm guitar, vocals; Slick Aguilar – lead guitar, backing vocals; Jack Casady – bass, guitar; T Lavitz – keyboards, synthesizers; Prairie Prince – drums, percussion	Windows of Heaven (1998)
1998–2000	Marty Balin – vocals, acoustic guitar; Diana Mangano – vocals; Paul Kantner – rhythm guitar, vocals; Slick Aguilar – lead guitar, backing vocals; Jack Casady – bass, guitar; Chris Smith – keyboards, synthesizers; Prairie Prince – drums, percussion	Greatest Hits: Live at the Fillmore (1999)
2000–2005	Marty Balin – vocals, acoustic guitar; Diana Mangano – vocals; Paul Kantner – rhythm guitar, vocals; Slick Aguilar – lead guitar, backing vocals; Chris Smith – keyboards, synthesizers, bass; Prairie Prince – drums, percussion	Across the Sea of Suns (2001)
2005–2008	Marty Balin – vocals, acoustic guitar; Diana Mangano – vocals; Paul Kantner – rhythm guitar, vocals; David Freiberg – acoustic guitar, vocals; Slick Aguilar – lead guitar, backing vocals; Chris Smith – keyboards, synthesizers, bass; Prairie Prince – drums, percussion	Jefferson's Tree of Liberty (2008)
2008–2012	David Freiberg – vocals, acoustic guitar; Cathy Richardson – vocals, acoustic guitar; Paul Kantner – rhythm guitar, vocals; Slick Aguilar – lead guitar, backing vocals; Chris Smith – keyboards, synthesizers, bass; Donny Baldwin – drums, backing vocals	none – live performances only
September 2012 – November 2015	David Freiberg – vocals, acoustic guitar; Cathy Richardson – vocals, acoustic guitar; Paul Kantner – rhythm guitar, vocals; Jude Gold – lead guitar; Chris Smith – keyboards, synthesizers, bass; Donny Baldwin – drums, backing vocals	none – live performances only
November 2015 – January 2016	David Freiberg – vocals, acoustic guitar; Rachel Rose – vocals; Paul Kantner – rhythm guitar, vocals; Jude Gold – lead guitar; Chris Smith – keyboards, synthesizers, bass; Donny Baldwin – drums, backing vocals	none – live performances only
January – March 2016	David Freiberg – vocals, acoustic guitar; Rachel Rose – vocals; Jude Gold – lead guitar; Chris Smith – keyboards, synthesizers, bass; Donny Baldwin – drums, backing vocals	none – live performances only
March 2016 – present	David Freiberg – vocals, acoustic guitar; Cathy Richardson – vocals, acoustic guitar; Jude Gold – lead guitar; Chris Smith – keyboards, synthesizers, bass; Donny Baldwin – drums, backing vocals	Mother of the Sun (2020)

== See also ==
- List of Jefferson Airplane members
- List of Starship members

== Bibliography ==
- Fenton, Craig (August 7, 2008), Have You Seen the Stars Tonite: The Jefferson Starship Flight Manual 1974–1978 and J. S. the Next Generation 1992–2007, Createspace, ISBN 978-1438245348, archived from the original on October 16, 2017
- Fenton, Craig (November 22, 2006), Take Me to a Circus Tent: The Jefferson Airplane Flight Manual, West Conshohocken, Pennsylvania: Infinity Publishing, ISBN 978-0741436566, archived from the original on October 16, 2017
