= Jefferson Starship discography =

- Studio albums: 11
- Live albums: 6
- Compilation albums: 4
- Singles: 22

This is a comprehensive discography of Jefferson Starship, a rock band from San Francisco that developed out of Jefferson Airplane in 1974.

== Albums ==
=== Studio albums ===
Title	Album details	Peak chart positions						Certifications
Title	Album details	US	AUS	CAN	NED	NZ	UK	Certifications
Dragon Fly	Released: October 1974; Label: Grunt/RCA	11	60	18	—	—	—	US: Gold
Red Octopus	Released: June 13, 1975; Label: Grunt/RCA	1	69	13	—	15	—	US: 2× Platinum
Spitfire	Released: June 1976; Label: Grunt/RCA	3	62	3	17	13	30	CAN: Gold; US: Platinum
Earth	Released: March 1978; Label: Grunt/RCA	5	61	4	—	29	—	US: Platinum
Freedom at Point Zero	Released: November 1979; Label: Grunt/RCA	10	75	20	—	23	22	CAN: Platinum; US: Gold
Modern Times	Released: April 2, 1981; Label: Grunt/RCA	26	84	15	—	—	—	US: Gold
Winds of Change	Released: October 4, 1982; Label: Grunt/RCA	26	—	—	—	—	—	US: Gold
Nuclear Furniture	Released: June 1984; Label: Grunt/RCA	28	—	—	—	—	—	US: Gold
Windows of Heaven	Released: February 9, 1999; Label: CMC International	—	—	—	—	—	—	—
Jefferson's Tree of Liberty	Released: September 2, 2008; Label: Varèse Sarabande/Universal Music Group	—	—	—	—	—	—	—
Mother of the Sun	Released: August 22, 2020; Label: Golden Robot	—	—	—	—	—	—	—
"—" denotes release did not chart and/or not certified.

=== Live albums ===
Year	Title
1982	RCA Special Radio Series Volume 19
1995	Deep Space/Virgin Sky
1999	Greatest Hits: Live at the Fillmore (compilation/live)
2001	Across the Sea of Suns
2013	Live In Central Park NYC May 12, 1975
2014	Soiled Dove

Soundboard recordings These were CDs recorded directly from the soundboard at the live shows and sold to concert attendees. They were also sold online for a short time.

- Live at B. B. King's Blues Club (2000)
- Live at Vinoy Park (2000)
- Post Nine 11 (2001) (6 concerts released separately)
- UK (2002) (6 concerts released separately)
- Live (2003) (3 concerts released separately)
- Galactic Reunion Concert (2005)

=== Compilation albums ===
Year	Title	Chart positions		Certifications
Year	Title	CAN	US	Certifications
1979	Gold	53	20	US: Gold
1991	Greatest Hits (Ten Years and Change 1979-1991)	—	—	US: Gold
1993	Jefferson Starship at Their Best	—	—	—
1998	Jefferson Airplane – Jefferson Starship – Starship: Hits	—	—	—
2008	Playlist: The Very Best of Jefferson Starship	—	—	—
2019	Starship Enterprise: The Best of Jefferson Starship and Starship	—	—	—
"—" denotes release did not chart and/or not certified.

=== Paul Kantner and Jefferson Starship ===
Before the band Jefferson Starship was formed in 1974, Paul Kantner had released the album Blows Against the Empire in 1970 under the artist name "Paul Kantner and Jefferson Starship" with an ad hoc group of musicians featuring himself and Grace Slick. Besides Kantner and Slick, two other members of the original 1974 lineup of Jefferson Starship performed on the album, Peter Kaukonen and David Freiberg, while Marty Balin, who joined Jefferson Starship in 1975, contributed to the songwriting. However, Blows Against the Empire is not considered a part of the band's official discography.

Title	Album details	Peak chart positions		Certifications
Title	Album details	US	UK	Certifications
Blows Against the Empire	Released: October 1970; Label: RCA Victor	20	12	US: Gold

== Singles ==
Year	Song	Chart positions						Album
Year	Song	CAN	NZ	UK	US	US Rock	US AC	Album
1974	"Ride the Tiger"	—	—	—	84	—	—	Dragon Fly
1975	"Miracles"	22	40	—	3	—	17	Red Octopus
1976	"Play on Love"	46	—	—	49	—	—	Red Octopus
1976	"With Your Love"	10	—	—	12	—	6	Spitfire
1976	"St. Charles"	—	—	—	64	—	—	Spitfire
1978	"Count On Me"	9	24	—	8	—	15	Earth
1978	"Runaway"	9	—	—	12	—	37	Earth
1978	"Crazy Feelin'"	71	—	—	54	—	—	Earth
1978	"Light the Sky on Fire"	73	—	—	66	—	—	Gold
1979	"Jane"	13	18	21	14	—	—	Freedom at Point Zero
1980	"Girl with the Hungry Eyes"	—	—	—	55	—	—	Freedom at Point Zero
1981	"Find Your Way Back"	29	—	—	29	3	—	Modern Times
1981	"Stranger"	—	—	—	48	17	—	Modern Times
1981	"Save Your Love"	—	—	—	104	49	—	Modern Times
1981	"Stairway to Cleveland"	—	—	—	—	—	—	Modern Times
1982	"Be My Lady"	—	—	—	28	33	—	Winds of Change
1982	"Can't Find Love"	—	—	—	—	16	—	Winds of Change
1983	"Winds of Change"	—	—	—	38	18	—	Winds of Change
1984	"No Way Out"	59	—	—	23	1	—	Nuclear Furniture
1984	"Layin' It on the Line"	—	—	—	66	6	—	Nuclear Furniture
1984	"Sorry Me, Sorry You"	—	—	—	—	50	—	Nuclear Furniture
2020	"It's About Time"	—	—	—	—	—	—	Mother of the Sun
2026	"Jetpack"	—	—	—	—	—	—	Non-album single
"—" denotes releases that did not chart or were not released in that territory.

== Other appearances ==
Year	Work	Song	Comments
1977	Flight Log	"Please Come Back"	live recording
1978	Star Wars Holiday Special	"Light the Sky on Fire"	also released as a single
1987	"Nothing's Gonna Stop Us Now" single	"Layin' It on the Line" (live)	B-side of the Starship song

== Collaborations ==
Year	Work	Artist	Collaborators
1970	Blows Against the Empire	Paul Kantner & Jefferson Starship	David Freiberg, Grace Slick
1971	If I Could Only Remember My Name	David Crosby	Freiberg, Kantner, Slick
1971	Sunfighter	Paul Kantner & Grace Slick	Craig Chaquico, Papa John Creach
1971	Papa John Creach	Papa John Creach	Kantner, Pete Sears, Slick
1972	Rolling Thunder	Mickey Hart	Freiberg, Kantner, Slick
1973	Baron von Tollbooth & the Chrome Nun	Paul Kantner, Grace Slick & David Freiberg	John Barbata, Chaquico, Creach, Freiberg
1973	Child of Nature	Jack Traylor & Steelwind	Chaquico, Freiberg
1974	Manhole	Grace Slick	Barbata, Chaquico, Freiberg, Sears
1974	Let It Flow	Elvin Bishop	Donny Baldwin, Mickey Thomas
1975	Juke Joint Jump	Elvin Bishop	Donny Baldwin, Mickey Thomas
1975	Solid Silver	Quicksilver Messenger Service	Freiberg, Sears
1975	Struttin' My Stuff	Elvin Bishop	Baldwin, Thomas
1976	Hometown Boy Makes Good!	Elvin Bishop	Baldwin, Thomas
1977	Raisin' Hell	Elvin Bishop	Baldwin, Thomas
1981	Alive Alone	Mickey Thomas	Chaquico, Baldwin
1983	Planet Earth Rock and Roll Orchestra	Paul Kantner	Chaquico, Sears, Slick, Thomas
1984	Software	Grace Slick	Kantner, Thomas

== Videos ==
=== Music videos ===
List of music videos, with directors, showing year released
Year	Video	Director
1981	"Find Your Way Back"	C.D. Taylor
1981	"Stranger"	C.D. Taylor
1982	"Be My Lady"	Jerry Kramer
1983	"Can't Find Love"	Stanley Dorfman
1983	"Out of Control"	Jerry Kramer
1983	"Winds of Change"	Jerry Kramer
1984	"No Way Out"	
1984	"Layin' It on the Line"	Irv Goodnoff
