= Find Your Way Back =

Find Your Way Back may refer to:

- Find Your Way Back (Jefferson Starship song), 1981
- Find Your Way Back (Beyoncé song), 2019
