= Mother of the Sun =

Studio album by Jefferson Starship
- Released: August 22, 2020
- Recorded: 2019–2020
- Length: 32:05
- Label: Golden Robot Records
- Producer: Jefferson Starship

Jefferson Starship chronology
| Jefferson's Tree of Liberty (2008) | Mother of the Sun (2020) |

Singles from Mother of the Sun
- 1. "It's About Time" Released: July 28, 2020; 2. "What Are We Waiting For?" Released: August 22, 2020; 3. "Setting Sun" Released: February 26, 2021

Professional ratings
Review scores
| Source | Rating |
|---|---|
| AllMusic | 2/5 stars |
| Liverpool Sound & Vision | 8.5/10 stars |
| Loudersound | 70/100 |
| Maximum Volume | 8.5/10 stars |
| Subculture Entertainment | 4/5 stars |
| Velvet Thunder | (favorable) |

Mother of the Sun is the eleventh studio album by American rock band Jefferson Starship. It was released on August 22, 2020, through Golden Robot Records.

== Production ==
This is the first album from the band to not include any contributions from founder Paul Kantner, who died in 2016. This is also the first studio album from the band in 36 years to include former bassist Pete Sears, who plays on three tracks on the album. After the recording of their last studio album, Jefferson's Tree of Liberty (2008), drummer Prairie Prince departed from the group and was replaced by 1982–84 drummer Donny Baldwin to perform on the tour. Baldwin, who had also performed with the offshoot band Starship from 1984 to 1989, has remained with Jefferson Starship since, and this is his first album with the group since 1984's Nuclear Furniture.

The first single from the album, "It's About Time", was co-written by co-founder and former vocalist Grace Slick, and "Don't Be Sad Anymore" was written by former vocalist Marty Balin, who died in 2018. A live rendition of Jorma Kaukonen's instrumental "Embryonic Journey", is featured on the album.

== Reception ==
The album garnered mixed reviews from professional critics. Stephen Thomas Erlewine of AllMusic said of the album "Whether it's a rocker or a ballad (and there are more of the latter than the former), almost everything on Mother of the Sun is overblown in a manner that's specific to the mid-'80s, when AOR airwaves were littered with '60s veterans flexing their muscles in an attempt to sound relevant."

== Track listing ==
Mother of the Sun track listing
| No. | Title | Writer(s) | Length |
|---|---|---|---|
| 1. | "It's About Time" | Cathy Richardson, Grace Slick, Jude Gold | 4:12 |
| 2. | "What Are We Waiting For?" | Richardson, Donny Baldwin | 4:07 |
| 3. | "Setting Sun" | Richardson, David Freiberg | 5:13 |
| 4. | "Runaway Again" | Richardson, Gold | 4:48 |
| 5. | "Embryonic Journey" (Live) | Jorma Kaukonen | 5:22 |
| 6. | "Don't Be Sad Anymore" | Chris Smith, Marty Balin | 3:07 |
| 7. | "What Are We Waiting For?" (Extended) | Richardson, Baldwin | 5:14 |
| Total length: | | | 32:05 |

== Personnel ==
Adapted from liner notes.

Jefferson Starship

- Cathy Richardson – lead vocals (1, 2, 4, 7), backing vocals, guitar, keyboards
- David Freiberg – lead vocals (3, 6), backing vocals, guitar
- Jude Gold – lead guitar
- Chris Smith – keyboards
- Donny Baldwin – drums, backing vocals

Additional musicians

- Pete Sears – bass (1, 3, 4)
- Greg Panciera – bass (2, 7), shaker (1)
- China Kantner – backing vocals (4)

=== Production ===
- Jefferson Starship – producer
- Greg Panciera – mixing
- Greg Calbi – mastering
- Jason Reed, David Freiberg, Jono Brown, Thomas Woodfill, Jeff Tamalier, Peter Deleon, Cathy Richardson, Jude Gold – recording
- Nicholas Mohler – cover artwork
- Kevin Baldes – photography
- Hendrix Richardson – boy on cover

Space imagery courtesy of NASA.
