= Find Your Way Back (Jefferson Starship song) =

Single by Jefferson Starship

from the album Modern Times
- B-side: "Modern Times"
- Released: March 1981
- Genre: Rock
- Length: 4:15
- Label: Grunt Records
- Songwriters: Craig Chaquico, Tom Borsdorf
- Producer: Ron Nevison

Jefferson Starship singles chronology
"Girl With the Hungry Eyes" (1980)	"Find Your Way Back" (1981)	"Stranger" (1981)

"Find Your Way Back" is a song recorded by Jefferson Starship and released as the first single from their album Modern Times. It reached No. 29 on the Billboard Hot 100 in the spring of 1981.

Record World called it a "hot rocker."

An instrumental version was released on Craig Chaquico's album Acoustic Planet.

== Charts ==
Chart (1981)	Peak position
U.S. Billboard Hot 100	29
U.S. Top Rock Tracks	3
