= Heroes of Woodstock Tour =

2009 concert tour

- Tour by Jefferson Starship, Canned Heat, Ten Years After, Big Brother and the Holding Company, Tom Constanten and Country Joe McDonald
- Start date: August 1, 2009
- End date: October 10, 2009
- Legs: 1
- No. of shows: 16

The Heroes of Woodstock Tour was a North American concert tour celebrating the 40th anniversary of the 1969 Woodstock Festival. The tour featured several bands, most of which performed at the original Woodstock festival or feature members that performed at the festival. The musicians featured differed slightly from venue to venue but most of the concerts featured Jefferson Starship, Big Brother and the Holding Company, Canned Heat, Ten Years After and Tom Constanten. Some dates featured Melanie, Edgar Winter, John Sebastian, Quicksilver Messenger Service, Mountain and the Levon Helm Band. Country Joe McDonald hosted all of the concerts, playing a couple of songs in between the different sets. The tour was widely viewed as a financial failure as attendance proved to be dismal across most of the dates.

== Notes ==
- Canned Heat reunited with former members Larry "The Mole" Taylor and Harvey "The Snake" Mandel for the tour. The original Woodstock Festival lineup included Larry (The Mole) Taylor, Harvey (The Snake) Mandel, Allan (Blind Owl) Wilson, Bob (The Bear) Hite and Adolfo (Fito) De La Parra.
- Jefferson Starship added bassist Jeff Pevar for this tour. They had previously been touring without a bassist while Chris Smith provided synthesized bass.
- Tom Constanten performed the music of the Grateful Dead as a guest of Jefferson Starship.
- Big Brother and the Holding Company performed the music of Janis Joplin. Although Big Brother did not play at the original Woodstock Festival, Sam Andrew performed at it with Janis as a member of her Kozmic Blues Band.
- Mountain guitarist/singer Leslie West married his fiancé Jenni Maurer at the concert held in Bethel, New York on August, 15 in front of approximately 15,000 people.

== Soundboard downloads ==
With every ticket to a Heroes of Woodstock performance, the ticket holder received a free soundboard download of the concert they attended in .mp3 format. The downloads became available one to five days after a concert ended and were available for free for three days. In order to access the download, a person had to enter a code given away at the concert they attended. After three days of access, the files were no longer available for free download but .flac files were still available for purchase.

== Tour dates ==
June 12, 2009 – Del Mar Fairgrounds - San Diego County Fair, San Diego, CA
Performers: Country Joe McDonald, Big Brother and the Holding Company, Canned Heat, Jefferson Starship, Tom Constanten

=== July 31, 2009 – Genesee Theatre, Waukegan, Illinois ===
Performers: Jefferson Starship, John Sebastian, Canned Heat, Big Brother and the Holding Company, Tom Constanten, Country Joe McDonald

=== August 1, 2009 – Soaring Eagle Casino, Mount Pleasant, Michigan ===
Performers: Jefferson Starship, John Sebastian, Canned Heat, Big Brother and the Holding Company, Tom Constanten, Country Joe McDonald

=== August 2, 2009 – Fraze Pavilion, Kettering, Ohio ===
Performers: Jefferson Starship, John Sebastian, Canned Heat, Big Brother and the Holding Company, Tom Constanten, Country Joe McDonald

=== August 9, 2009 – The Barnyard, Livermore, Maine ===
Performers: Jefferson Starship, Ten Years After, Canned Heat, Big Brother and the Holding Company, Tom Constanten, Country Joe McDonald

=== August 12, 2009 – Nokia Theatre, New York, New York ===
Performers: Jefferson Starship, Ten Years After, Canned Heat, Big Brother and the Holding Company, Tom Constanten, Country Joe McDonald

=== August 13, 2009 – Westbury Music Fair, Westbury, New York ===
Performers: Jefferson Starship, Ten Years After, Canned Heat, Big Brother and the Holding Company, Tom Constanten, Country Joe McDonald

=== August 14, 2009 – MGM Grand at Foxwoods, Mashantucket, Connecticut ===
Performers: Jefferson Starship, Ten Years After, Canned Heat, Big Brother and the Holding Company, Tom Constanten, Country Joe McDonald

=== August 15, 2009 – Bethel Woods Center for the Arts, Bethel, New York ===
Performers: Levon Helm Band, Mountain, Jefferson Starship, Ten Years After, Canned Heat, Big Brother and the Holding Company, Tom Constanten, Country Joe McDonald

Notes: This was the site of the original Woodstock Festival and held on the 40th anniversary of the first day, Friday August 15, 1969. Blind 15-year-old musician Conrad Oberg opened up the show. Jocko Marcellino from Sha Na Na performed a song backed by Canned Heat. Gary Duncan guested with Jefferson Starship. Leslie West married his fiancé Jenny Maurer on stage to a sold out audience at the end of Mountain's set. Japanese vocalist Shiho Ochi of Superfly performed with Big Brother and the Holding Company singing "Down On Me" and "Piece of My Heart" as part of her Following the Steps of Janis documentary on the Music On! TV channel.

=== August 16, 2009 – Tsongas Arena, Lowell, Massachusetts ===
Performers: Jefferson Starship, Ten Years After, Canned Heat, Big Brother and the Holding Company, Tom Constanten, Country Joe McDonald

=== August 18, 2009 – Mann Center for the Performing Arts, Philadelphia, Pennsylvania ===
Performers: Jefferson Starship, Ten Years After, Canned Heat, Big Brother and the Holding Company, Tom Constanten, Country Joe McDonald

=== August 20, 2009 – Bass Performance Hall, Fort Worth, Texas ===
Performers: Jefferson Starship, Ten Years After, Canned Heat, Edgar Winter, Tom Constanten, Country Joe McDonald

=== August 22, 2009 – Blues Ranch, Winthrop, Washington ===
Performers: Jefferson Starship, Ten Years After, Canned Heat, Big Brother and the Holding Company, Tom Constanten, Country Joe McDonald, Randy Hansen

=== August 23, 2009 – Greek Theatre, Los Angeles, California ===
Performers: Jefferson Starship, Ten Years After, Canned Heat, Big Brother and the Holding Company, Tom Constanten, Country Joe McDonald

=== August 26, 2009 – Mountain Winery, Saratoga, California ===
Performers: Jefferson Starship, Ten Years After, Canned Heat, Big Brother and the Holding Company, Tom Constanten, Country Joe McDonald

=== September 7, 2009 – Sausalito Arts Festival, Sausalito, California ===
Performers: Jefferson Starship, Quicksilver Messenger Service, Canned Heat, Big Brother and the Holding Company, Tom Constanten, Country Joe McDonald

October 10, 2009 – Spotlight 29 Casino, Coachella, California
Performers: Jefferson Starship, Melanie, Canned Heat, Big Brother and the Holding Company, Tom Constanten, Country Joe McDonald
