= Jefferson's Tree of Liberty =

The Tree of Liberty

Studio album by Jefferson Starship
- Released: September 2, 2008
- Recorded: October 27, 1970 at Wally Heider Studios in San Francisco, California; 1998 at Coast Recorders in San Francisco, California; March 16–30, 2008 and May 14–18, 2008 at Renegade Studios in San Rafael, California
- Genre: Folk rock
- Length: 67:08
- Label: The Lab, Varèse Sarabande, Universal Music Group
- Producer: Michael Gaiman, David Freiberg, Paul Kantner

Jefferson Starship chronology
| Across the Sea of Suns (2001) | The Tree of Liberty (2008) | Mother of the Sun (2020) |

Professional ratings
Review scores
| Source | Rating |
|---|---|
| Blogcritics | (favorable) |
| Boston Herald | (C) |
| Goldmine | 4/5 stars |
| Mojo | 3/5 stars |
| Musictap | 4/5 stars |
| Philadelphia Daily News | (B+) |
| Toronto Sun | 2.5/5 stars |
| Yahoo! Music | (favorable) |

Jefferson's Tree of Liberty is the tenth album by Jefferson Starship, released on September 2, 2008. It is the band's first studio album since 1999's Windows of Heaven. The new album includes cover songs from Irish, American, English, and Latin-American traditions. The title is a reference to Thomas Jefferson's quotation, "The tree of liberty must be refreshed from time to time with the blood of patriots and tyrants." The idea began in 2003 as "The Cuba Project", which was to include classic protest and folk songs recorded in Cuba. In 2008 the album was finally recorded but in California. About half of the songs planned for The Cuba Project were used on the final cut, with other songs coming from Jefferson Starship's previous repertoire and another project band member Paul Kantner had planned called "On the Threshold of Fire." The promotional tour for the album began in late June with shows at Larkspur, California followed by tours in the US and Europe before the album's release, and continued through December 2008 with a further tour in the US and a tour in Japan. On February 1, 2009, more tour dates and venues were announced by the band's manager Michael Gaiman, with additional plans to continue the tour through 2010 and bring it to Australia and South America. David Grisman joined the band for the April 2009 tour dates. The band's promotion for the album ended in June 2009 as the band changed their set-list to Jefferson Airplane's Woodstock Festival material and started touring with the "Heroes of Woodstock" through the end of October.

== Planning and production ==
=== The Cuba Project ===
In 2003, Paul Kantner published a book of Jefferson Airplane and Jefferson Starship lyrics, entitled Lyrica: Paul Kantner's Theory of Everything. In the book, a new album is mentioned as "es posible?", entitled "The Cuba Project: Flores de la Noche." Marty Balin had been pushing for a classic style Jefferson Starship album, but Kantner and manager Michael Gaiman pushed for the idea of recording older protest songs in Cuba. A song list and Gaiman's notes were published along with the Lyrica book, which included 21 songs selected by Kantner, Balin and Gaiman. Manager Michael Gaiman had visited the University of Havana to set up recording for the band, but the United States Department of State wouldn't allow the venture. The next plan was to record in Amsterdam, but the financing could not be put together and the project was left in limbo as the band continued to tour.

=== Personnel changes ===
In 2007 Marty Balin began to tour less with the band, turning a majority of his time to taking care of his disabled daughter. Prairie Prince decided to leave after being with the band since 1992. Diana Mangano also left around the same time and was replaced by vocalist Cathy Richardson. Once Richardson joined the band, Gaiman and Kantner decided the time was right to record the album, partly to have an album ready in time for the 2008 US presidential elections. The album would be recorded in California. As the band's personnel continued to change, it was uncertain who would participate in the new album. At the time studio sessions began, the band consisted of Paul Kantner, Slick Aguilar, Chris Smith, Cathy Richardson, Donny Baldwin, and David Freiberg. The band made the decision that the album would be mostly acoustic, so band member Slick Aguilar did not contribute on most of the songs included. Although Donny Baldwin now handled the drums on tour, Prairie Prince returned for the studio sessions. Marty Balin was to have recorded lead vocals for a cover of Bruce Cockburn's "If I Had a Rocket Launcher" and Buffalo Springfield's "For What It's Worth" but his art touring schedule conflicted with studio sessions and he could not attend. Instead, manager Gaiman took the track "Maybe for You" that had appeared on the German version of Windows of Heaven and substituted it for Marty's contribution. Richardson and David Freiberg recorded vocals for other songs that had been planned for Balin. Jack Casady appears on "Maybe for You" but did not participate in the recording of the album. Kantner and Grace Slick's daughter China attempted to convince Slick to sing again, but she did not want to return to performing. Gaiman convinced Slick to let the band use a previously unreleased recording from 1970 and Slick's vocals appear on the hidden track at the end of the album. Previous Jefferson Starship vocalists Diana Mangano and Darby Gould also contributed vocals to the album.

=== Final cut ===
The final cut of the album includes about half of the songs originally planned. Other material included on the album include songs that Jefferson Starship has been performing since 1992 but had not committed to an album previously, including "Frenario" and World Entertainment War's "In a Crisis." Also included are several songs that Kantner had learned from The Weavers, adding his own lyrical twists to them, "Wasn't That a Time", "Follow the Drinking Gourd", "Santy Anno", and "Kisses Sweeter Than Wine." "Santy Anno" had been planned for a solo project entitled On the Threshold of Fire. Kantner folded several songs he had been writing together to create his new version of "On the Threshold of Fire." "Cowboy on the Run", a song from Freiberg's previous band, Quicksilver Messenger Service is also included. "The Quiet Joys of Brotherhood" was not intended for the album until Darby Gould on the first day of mixing wanted to redo her vocals for "Genesis Hall." Gaiman instead suggested that she record another song, but it would have to be a cappella. They settled on covering Sandy Denny's version of "The Quiet Joys of Brotherhood." In a nod to the band's past the album features a small image of the cover art to the 1974 Jefferson Starship album Dragon Fly on its rear cover.

== Bill Thompson / Grace Slick lawsuit ==
Around March 2007, the band performed some concerts to advertise Microsoft's product, Windows Vista and were paid $100,000. Although Kantner had been using the name Jefferson Starship since 1992, it was in fact a violation of the agreement he had signed in 1985 when he had left the band. Bill Thompson as manager of Jefferson Starship sued Kantner for using the band name. Grace Slick was named as plaintiff along with Thompson. The album was in production at the time the case was going to court, and Slick remains uncredited on the album. The case was however settled in April 2008, with Kantner agreeing to pay a license fee to Thompson and Slick to be able to use the name Jefferson Starship indefinitely.

== Promotion and tour ==
The album was promoted in several different ways. In addition to the band's own website, a Myspace page was started with several tracks from the album available for listening. The band also posted a live performance of "Chimes of Freedom" to YouTube, and later added a video montage of the studio sessions set to the studio version of the same song. In June, 2008, 3 days of concerts featuring Kantner, Freiberg, Richardson, and Smith were held in Larkspur near San Francisco with performances of Kantner's previous albums Blows Against the Empire, Baron von Tollbooth & the Chrome Nun and all the tracks from the new album. In addition, several "listening parties" were held where fans in attendance along with press could hear the album in its entirety before the band itself performed. After the June concerts in Larkspur, several concerts in California and New England including listening parties followed. In late July, a tour of the United Kingdom and Italy began. Slick Aguilar could not tour outside of the US, so Jeff Pevar and John Ferenzik took over guitar duties, and Tony Morley joined the band playing rhythm guitar, mandolin, and percussion. The European tour ended shortly before the album's release and the American tour resumed on the release date of the album, with Aguilar returning and with Marty Balin joining the band for some of the American concerts. The band decided to tour in two different configurations: for the most part they would perform as an acoustic ensemble with Kantner, Freiberg, Richardson, and Smith; and occasionally they would play a full electric set and include Aguilar, Baldwin, and sometimes Balin. The tour continued throughout 2008 with a tour of the East Coast, West Coast, and Midwest of the United States. In November, Kantner, Smith, Richardson, and Freiberg left the mainland and performed in Hawaii followed by a tour in Japan, with Tony Morley joining again in Japan. Balin was scheduled for the Hawaii concerts, but did not attend. A further tour was announced in February 2009 covering several US states, the UK, and Holland. In April, the electric version of the band joined David Grisman as "The Jefferson-Grisman" project for a series of performances in April. In June, Jeff Pevar joined the band as bassist, and the band changed its focus from the album to Jefferson Airplane's Woodstock Festival material touring in the electric configuration with Tom Constanten, Canned Heat, Ten Years After, Big Brother & the Holding Company, and Country Joe MacDonald for a tour known as "Heroes of Woodstock."

== Track listing ==
| No. | Title | Writer(s) | Personnel | Length |
|---|---|---|---|---|
| 1. | "Wasn't That a Time" | Lee Hays, William Lowenfels, additional lyrics by Paul Kantner | Personnel: Paul Kantner — vocals, 12-string acoustic guitar; David Freiberg — vocals, acoustic guitar; Cathy Richardson — vocals; Michael Eisenstein — acoustic guitar; Michael Gaiman — flat-picked acoustic guitar; David LaFlamme — violin; Chris Smith — piano, bass; Prairie Prince — drums | 2:38 |
| 2. | "Follow the Drinking Gourd" | traditional | Personnel: Paul Kantner — vocals, banjo; David Freiberg — vocals, washboard guitar; Cathy Richardson — vocals, harmonica; Chris Smith — piano, bass; Prairie Prince — snare and kick | 3:04 |
| 3. | "Santy Anno" | traditional, arranged by Kantner | Personnel: Paul Kantner — vocals, 12-string acoustic guitar, banjo; David Freiberg — vocals, acoustic guitar; Cathy Richardson — vocals; Chris Smith – bass, squeezebox | 3:14 |
| 4. | "Cowboy on the Run" | Dino Valenti | Personnel: Paul Kantner — 12-string acoustic guitar; David Freiberg — vocals, acoustic guitar; athy Richardson — vocals; Linda Imperial — vocals; Barry Sless — pedal steel guitar; Chris Smith — piano, bass; Prairie Prince — drums | 4:34 |
| 5. | "I Ain't Marching Anymore" | Phil Ochs, additional lyrics by Cathy Richardson | Personnel: Cathy Richardson — vocals, acoustic guitar | 3:13 |
| 6. | "Chimes of Freedom" | Bob Dylan | Personnel: Paul Kantner — vocals, 12-string acoustic guitar, glass harmonica; David Freiberg — vocals, acoustic guitar; Cathy Richardson — vocals; Chris Smith — piano, bass; Prairie Prince — drums | 3:54 |
| 7. | "Genesis Hall" | Richard Thompson | Personnel: Darby Gould — vocals; Mark Aguilar — tremolo and 'Soldano' electric guitars; Paul Kantner — 12-string acoustic guitar; David Freiberg — acoustic guitar; Chris Smith — piano, bass; Prairie Prince — drums | 3:14 |
| 8. | "Kisses Sweeter Than Wine" | Paul Campbell, Huddie Ledbetter | Personnel: Paul Kantner — vocals, 12-string acoustic guitar, "George Harrison" lead guitar; Cathy Richardson — vocals; David Freiberg — acoustic guitar; Chris Smith — piano, bass | 3:30 |
| 9. | "Royal Canal (The Auld Triangle)" | Brendan Behan | Personnel: Paul Kantner — vocals, 12-string acoustic guitar, glass harmonica; Diana Mangano — vocals; Chris Smith — drone | 3:17 |
| 10. | "Rising of the Moon" | J. K. Casey, Turlough O'Carolan | Personnel: Paul Kantner — vocals, 12-string acoustic guitar; David Freiberg — vocals, acoustic guitar; Cathy Richardson — vocals; Chris Smith — piano, pennywhistle; Prairie Prince — bodhrán, snare drum | 2:08 |
| 11. | "Frenario" | traditional | Personnel: Paul Kantner — vocals, 12-string acoustic guitar; David Freiberg — vocals, acoustic guitar; Cathy Richardson — vocals; David Grisman — mandolin; Chris Smith — piano, bass; Prairie Prince — drums | 4:07 |
| 12. | "In a Crisis" | World Entertainment War | Personnel: Paul Kantner — vocals, 12-string acoustic guitar; David Freiberg — vocals, acoustic guitar; Darby Gould — vocals; Chris Smith — bass; Barry Sless — pedal steel guitar | 4:45 |
| 13. | "Maybe for You" (from Windows of Heaven) | Terry Terrell | Personnel: Marty Balin — vocals, acoustic guitar; Slick Aguilar — electric guitar; Paul Kantner — 12-string electric guitar; T Lavitz — keyboards; Jack Casady — bass; Prairie Prince — drums | 2:51 |
| 14. | "Commandante Carlos Fonseca" | Carlos Mejia-Godoy, Tomás Borge | Personnel: Paul Kantner — vocals, 12-string acoustic guitar; Diana Mangano — vocals; Chris Smith — piano, bass | 3:24 |
| 15. | "Pastures of Plenty" | Woody Guthrie | Personnel: David Freiberg — vocals, acoustic guitar; Cathy Richardson — vocals; Chris Smith — bass; David Grisman — mandolin | 3:22 |
| 16. | "Imagine Redemption" (arrangement of "Imagine" and "Redemption Song") | John Lennon, Bob Marley, from an idea by Michael Gaiman | Personnel: Cathy Richardson — vocals; Darby Gould — vocals; David Freiberg — vocals; Paul Kantner — vocals; Chris Smith — piano, string synthesizer, bass | 3:13 |
| 17. | "On the Threshold of Fire" | Kantner | Personnel: Paul Kantner — vocals, 12-string acoustic guitar, glass harmonica; Cathy Richardson — vocals; David Freiberg — vocals; Paul Lamb — French horn; Chris Smith — piano; Alexander Kantner — bass | 4:49 |
| 18. | "The Quiet Joys of Brotherhood" | traditional, words by Richard Fariña | Personnel: Darby Gould — vocals | 2:58 |

Hidden track
| No. | Title | Writer(s) | Length |
|---|---|---|---|
| 19. | "Surprise Surprise" | Jack Traylor, Grace Slick, Kantner | 4:53 |

== Personnel ==
Personnel information from official page and liner notes

=== The Main Ten ===
- Paul Kantner – vocals, 12-string acoustic guitar, banjo, glass harmonica, 'George Harrison' lead guitar, 12-string electric guitar
- David Freiberg – vocals, acoustic guitar, washboard guitar
- Cathy Richardson – vocals, harmonica, acoustic guitar
- Chris Smith – piano, bass, squeezebox, drone, pennywhistle, string synthesizer
- Slick Aguilar – tremolo and 'Soldano' electric guitar on "Genesis Hall", lead guitar on "Maybe for You"
- Prairie Prince – drums, snare, kick, bodhran
- Donny Baldwin – drums (supporting tour)
- Darby Gould – vocals on "Genesis Hall", "In a Crisis", and "The Quiet Joys of Brotherhood"
- Diana Mangano – vocals on "Royal Canal" and "Commandante Carlos Fonseca"
- Marty Balin – acoustic guitar and vocals on "Maybe for You"

=== Featuring ===
- David Grisman – mandolin on "Frenario" and "Pastures of Plenty"
- Grace Slick – vocals on "Surprise Surprise" (uncredited)

=== Additional personnel ===
- David LaFlamme – violin on "Wasn't That a Time"
- Michael Gaiman – flat-picked acoustic guitar on "Wasn't That a Time"
- Michael Eisenstein – acoustic guitar on "Wasn't That a Time"
- Barry Sless – pedal steel guitar on "Cowboy on the Run" and "In a Crisis"
- The Wailin' Cowgirls (Cathy Richardson, Linda Imperial) – vocals on "Cowboy on the Run"
- Jack Casady – bass on "Maybe for You"
- T Lavitz – keyboards on "Maybe for You"
- The I-Jays (Paul Kantner, David Freiberg, Darby Gould) – vocals on "Imagine Redemption"
- Alexander Kantner – electric bass guitar on "On the Threshold of Fire"
- Paul Lamb – French horn on "On the Threshold of Fire"
- Jack Traylor – vocals on "Surprise Surprise" (uncredited)

=== Production ===
- Michael Gaiman – manager, producer, mixer, art & booklet design, layout & direction, liner notes
- David Freiberg – producer, mixer, additional recording, liner notes
- Paul Kantner – producer, mixer, liner notes
- Paul Lamb – engineer, mixer
- Cathy Richardson – additional recording
- John Ovnik – additional recording
- "Surprise Surprise" recorded at Wally Heider Studios in San Francisco, October 27, 1970
- "Maybe for You" recorded at Coast Recorders in San Francisco, 1998
- Recorded at Renegade Studios in San Rafael, March 16–30 and May 14–18, 2008
- Additional recording at FreeMountain studios and in Chicago
- Paul Stubblebine – mastering
- Rebecca Baltutis, Jesse Obstbaum – art & booklet design, layout & direction
- Mike Thut – photography

== Release history ==
| Region | Date | Label | Format | Catalog |
|---|---|---|---|---|
| United States | September 2, 2008 | Varèse Sarabande Records | CD | 3020617382 |
| Germany | September 12, 2008 | Evangeline Records | CD | |
| Singapore | September 15, 2008 | | CD | |
| Sweden | September 16, 2008 | Evangeline Records / Hemifrån | CD | |
| The Netherlands | September 26, 2008 | Evangeline Records | CD | |
| United Kingdom | September 29, 2008 | Evangeline Records | CD | |
| Poland | October 13, 2008 | Evangeline Records | CD | |
