= Cathy Richardson =

American singer, songwriter, actress

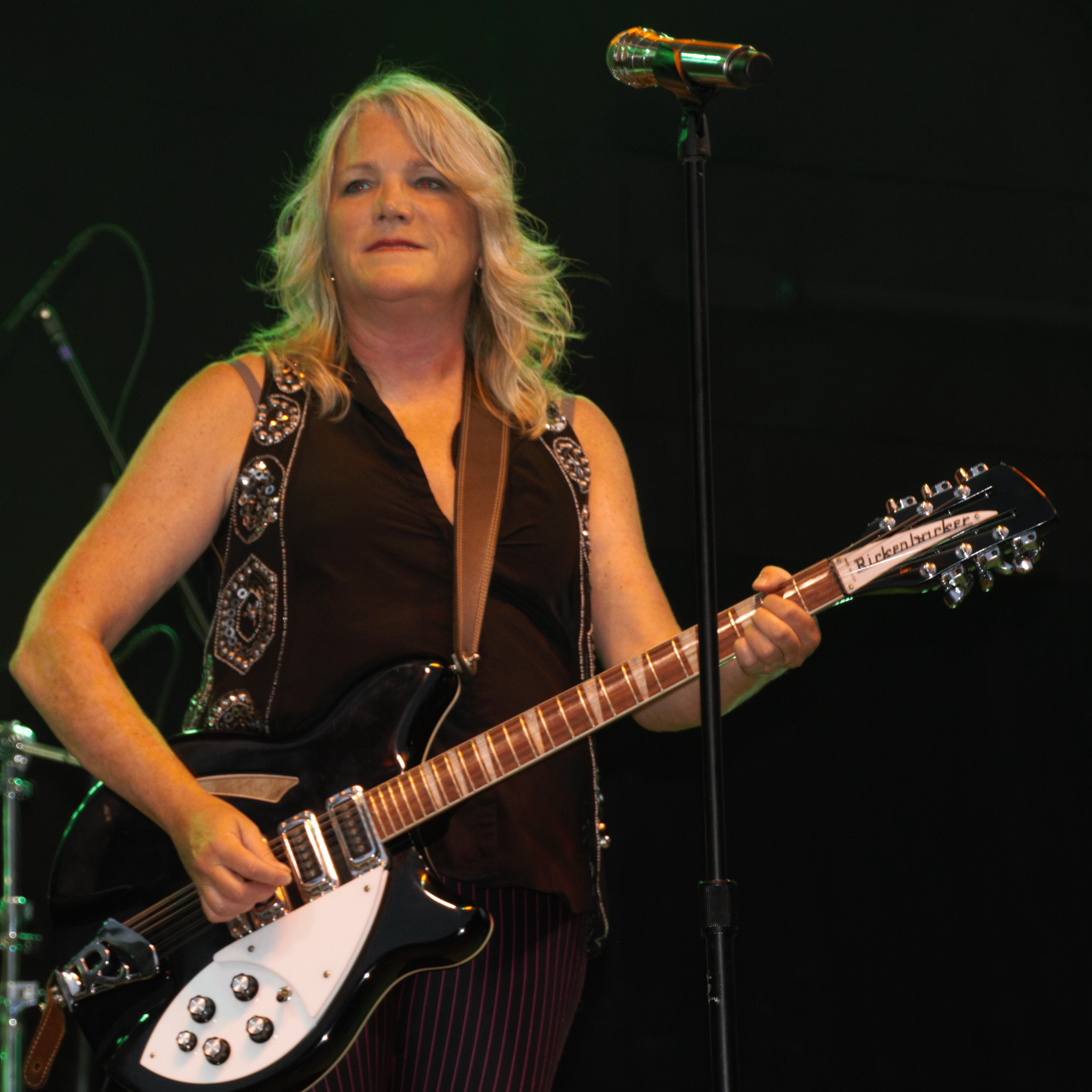
- Cathy Richardson in 2018

Background information
- Born: Catherine Richardson
- Genres: Psychedelic rock; folk rock; blues rock
- Occupation: Singer-songwriter
- Instruments: Vocals; guitar; keyboards
- Years active: 1990–present
- Website: www.crband.com

Catherine Richardson is an American singer-songwriter from the Chicago suburbs in Illinois. She is the lead singer for the band Jefferson Starship and her own Cathy Richardson Band, and has performed the Janis Joplin parts for Joplin's former band Big Brother and the Holding Company.

== Biography ==
Richardson grew up in west suburban Burr Ridge, Illinois, and graduated from Hinsdale Central High School in Hinsdale, Illinois. Before starting her music career, Richardson worked as an auto mechanic and as a cashier at her father's gas station. She started her music career full-time in 1990. She was introduced to Jim Peterik, who mentored her and helped with her first two albums. She has also co-written songs with Peterik and is a frequent guest in his all-star World Stage concerts.

Richardson guest starred as herself on Noggin's puppet series Jack's Big Music Show and provided the voice of Jack's off-screen mother. In the show's pilot episode, she provided the voice of Mary, one of the main characters.

The Cathy Richardson Band was voted Best Local Band in the Chicago Tribune readers poll of 1999 and best in WFLD's "Best & Worst of Chicago" viewer poll in November 2000.

She portrayed Janis Joplin in the 2001 original off-Broadway run of Love, Janis and much of the touring performances. She also sang Joplin's vocal parts for Big Brother and the Holding Company during many of their recent live shows.

In 2004, Richardson and art director Bill Dolan were nominated for the Grammy Award for Best Recording Package for the Cathy Richardson Band album The Road to Bliss.

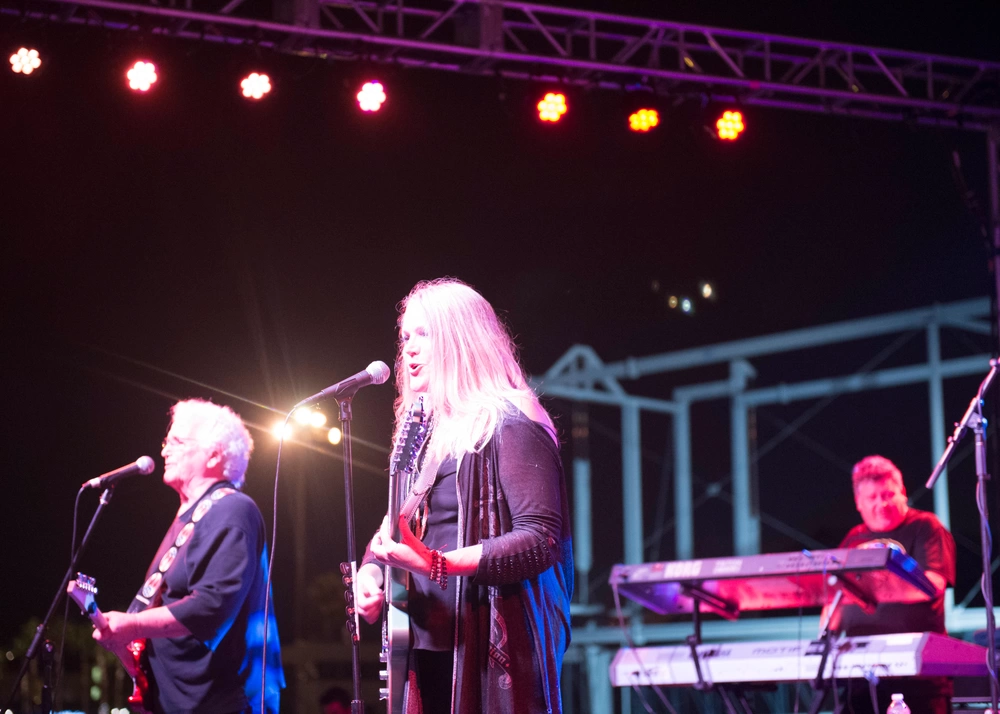
Richardson (middle) with David Freiberg and Chris Smith of Jefferson Starship in 2016

In 2008, Richardson became the new vocalist for San Francisco band Jefferson Starship and appears on the 2008 release Jefferson's Tree of Liberty and as vocalist with Jefferson Starship on PBS's 2011 60s Pop, Rock & Soul television show, performing "White Rabbit" and "Somebody to Love".

== Discography ==
=== Studio albums ===
- Moon, Not Banana (1993) Jessica Records
- Fools on a Tandem (1995) Jessica Records
- Snake Camp (1998) Bloody Nurse Records
- Buzzzed (2001) Bloody Nurse Records
- The Road to Bliss (2003) Cash Rich Records
- Delusions of Grandeur (2006) Cash Rich Records

=== Live album ===
- All Excess... Live @ The Park West (1996) Jessica Records

=== Compilation albums featuring tracks by Cathy Richardson ===
- Songs of Janis Joplin: Blues Down Deep (1997) House of Blues Records (song "Try Just a Little Bit Harder")
- Jim Peterik and World Stage (2000) Jim Peterik and Cathy Richardson (songs "Diamonds For Stones" and "From Here To Hereafter")
- Sweet Emotion: Songs of Aerosmith (2001) (song "Last Child")
- Here Come the Irish (2003) Written by John Scully and Jim Tullio, vocals by Cathy Richardson (Cathy is featured on the song "Here Come the Irish")
- Judgement Day, Songs of Robert Johnson (2004) (song "Preachin' Blues (Up Jumped the Devil)")
- Folksongs of Illinois, Vol. 4 (2011) (Cathy is featured on the Woody Guthrie song "Old Chy-Car-Go")
- Jim Peterik and World Stage: Tigress - Women Who Rock the World (2021) (songs "Living for the Moment", "Full Moon Crazy", "The Best in Us", and "Sin to Believe a Lie")
- Play On (2019) Ides of March and Cathy Richardson (song "Blue Storm Rising")

=== Download only single ===
- What I Am (2015) Chance Music (available through ITunes)

=== Side project albums and guest appearances ===
==== The Juleps ====
Cathy Richardson along with members of The Insiders

- Kickbutt City, USA (1998)

==== Joel Hoekstra ====
- Undefined (vocals on track "Spank Me") (2000)

==== Jefferson Starship ====
- Jefferson's Tree of Liberty (2008)
- Air Play (2011)
- Mother of the Sun (2020)

==== Macrodots ====
- The Other Side (2010)
- Macrodots Two (2015)
