= Across the Sea of Suns (album) =

Live album by Jefferson Starship
- Released: November 6, 2001
- Genre: Rock; Psychedelic rock
- Label: Zebra Records
- Producer: Michael Gaiman; Ricky Schultz (exec.)

Jefferson Starship chronology
| Greatest Hits: Live at the Fillmore (1999) | Across the Sea of Suns (2001) | Jefferson's Tree of Liberty (2008) |

Professional ratings
Review scores
| Source | Rating |
|---|---|
| Allmusic | 3/5 stars |

Across the Sea of Suns is a Jefferson Starship live album. The album was produced by using recordings from four different live venues: The Bottom Line in New York City; The IMAC at Huntington, New York; New Park Entertainment in Philadelphia; and The Keswick Theatre in Glenside, Pennsylvania. The album had further studio production at American Recording in Calabasas, California. Most of the tracks used for the final album were from The Bottom Line, and none of the tracks recorded in Philadelphia were used. The album was released as a double CD. Grace Slick provided liner notes, writing her own thoughts about sixteen of the songs included.

In 2018 an expanded edition entitled "Across The Expanded Sea Of Suns" was released with two discs containing tracks from The Bottom Line concert and a third disc live from the Melkweg 13th Cannabis Cup 2000.

== Track listing ==
Disc one
| No. | Title | Writer(s) | Length |
|---|---|---|---|
| 1. | "Caroline" | Marty Balin, Paul Kantner | 5:21 |
| 2. | "She Has Funny Cars" | Jorma Kaukonen, Balin | 5:09 |
| 3. | "When the Earth Moves Again" | Kantner | 4:11 |
| 4. | "Good Shepherd" | traditional, arranged by Kaukonen | 5:42 |
| 5. | "Today" | Balin, Kantner | 2:47 |
| 6. | "D. C. B. A. – 25" | Kantner | 2:41 |
| 7. | "Eskimo Blue Day" | Grace Slick, Kantner | 6:54 |
| 8. | "How Do You Feel" | Tom Mastin | 3:37 |
| 9. | "Miracles" | Balin | 7:09 |
| 10. | "Have You Seen the Stars Tonite" / "XM" / "Embryonic Journey" | David Crosby, Kantner / Kantner, Phil Sawyer, Jerry Garcia, Mickey Hart / Kaukonen | 3:45 / 0:57 / 2:55 |
| 11. | "Starship" | Kantner, Slick, Balin, Gary Blackman | 6:16 |

Disc two
| No. | Title | Writer(s) | Length |
|---|---|---|---|
| 1. | "There Will Be Love" | Kantner, Balin, Craig Chaquico | 4:51 |
| 2. | "Hearts" | Jesse Barish | 9:11 |
| 3. | "Hey Fredrick" | Slick | 5:56 |
| 4. | "When I Was a Boy I Watched the Wolves" | Kantner, Slick | 5:08 |
| 5. | "Hyperdrive" | Slick, Pete Sears | 7:06 |
| 6. | "You're Bringing Me Down" | Balin, Kantner | 2:35 |
| 7. | "The Ballad of You & Me & Pooneil" | Kantner | 10:24 |
| 8. | "Mexico" / "Wooden Ships" | Slick / Crosby, Kantner, Stephen Stills | 1:56 / 6:50 |
| 9. | "Somebody to Love" / "Volunteers" | Darby Slick / Balin, Kantner | 2:57 / 6:24 |

Bonus tracks
| No. | Title | Writer(s) | Length |
|---|---|---|---|
| 10. | "My Best Friend" | Skip Spence | 2:51 |
| 11. | "JPP McStep Blues" | Spence | 3:05 |

== Personnel ==
- Paul Kantner – 12-string guitar, vocals
- Marty Balin – vocals, acoustic guitar, percussion
- Slick Aguilar – electric guitar, vocals
- Prairie Prince – drums, percussion
- Diana Mangano – vocals
- Chris Smith – piano, synthesizer

=== Additional Personnel ===
- John Ferenzik – organ on "Good Shepherd", "Miracles", "Hearts" and "Hey Fredrick"

=== Production ===
- Michael Gaiman – producer, engineer, recordist, manager
- Ricky Schultz – executive producer
- Bill Cooper – assistant engineer
- Michael Eisenstein – stage manager, guitar technician
- Allen Pepper – live producer at the Bottom Line
- Michael Rothbard – live producer at Intermedia Arts Center
- Bill Rogers – live producer at New Park Entertainment
- Sid Payne – live producer at New Park Entertainment
- Roy Snyder – live producer at The Keswick Theatre
- "Good Shepherd", "Miracles", "Hearts" and "Hey Frederick" recorded June 22, 2001, at the Keswick Theatre
- "My Best Friend" and "J. P. P. McStep B. Blues" recorded February 19, 1999, at the IMAC in Huntington, New York
- All other tracks recorded June 3, 2001, at The Bottom Line in New York City
- Edited by Bill Cooper and Ricky at American Recording, Calabasas, California
- Mastered by Joe Gastwirt at Ocean View Digital Mastering, Los Angeles
- Grace Slick – liner notes
- Doug Veloric – other notes
- NASA – cover art
- Brian Lehrhoff – live band photography
- Doug Haverty – Art Direction & Design

== Notes ==
- Across the Sea of Suns (CD insert). Jefferson Starship. Calabasas, CA: Zebra Records. 2001. ZD-44024-2.
