= Greatest Hits: Live at the Fillmore =

Live album by Jefferson Starship
- Released: September 14, 1999
- Recorded: November 6, 1998
- Venue: The Fillmore (San Francisco)
- Genre: Rock; Psychedelic rock
- Label: CMC International
- Producer: James Delany, Michael Goodman

Jefferson Starship chronology
Windows of Heaven (1999)	Greatest Hits: Live at the Fillmore (1999)	Across the Sea of Suns (2001)

Professional ratings
Review scores
Source	Rating
Allmusic	2/5 stars

Greatest Hits: Live at the Fillmore is Jefferson Starship's second album on the CMC International label, on which their only studio album of the 1990s, Windows of Heaven had been released. Recorded at the Fillmore Auditorium, the live show aired on television for New Year's Eve 1999, and was later released as this album.

== Track listing ==
No.	Title	Writer(s)	Length
1.	"3/5 of a Mile in 10 Seconds"	Marty Balin	4:22
2.	"Plastic Fantastic Lover"	Balin	4:28
3.	"Somebody To Love"	Darby Slick	3:51
4.	"Crown Of Creation"	Kantner	3:53
5.	"It's No Secret"	Balin	2:34
6.	"The Light"	Kantner	6:28
7.	"White Rabbit"	Grace Slick	3:22
8.	"Caroline"	Balin, Kantner	5:19
9.	"Miracles"	Balin	7:33
10.	"Count On Me"	Jesse Barish	4:15
11.	"Volunteers"	Balin, Kantner	5:03
12.	"Wooden Ships"	David Crosby, Kantner, Stephen Stills	7:21
13.	"Let Me Fly"	Kantner	4:58
14.	"Ride The Tiger"	Kantner, G. Slick, Byong Yu	5:48

== Personnel ==
- Paul Kantner - vocals, rhythm guitar
- Marty Balin - vocals, acoustic guitar
- Jack Casady - bass
- Diana Mangano - vocals
- Slick Aguilar - lead guitar, background vocals
- Chris Smith - keyboards
- Prairie Prince - drums, percussion
