= Windows of Heaven =

Studio album by Jefferson Starship
- Released: June 1998 (GER); February 9th, 1999 (official)
- Recorded: 1996–1998 at Coast Recorders, San Francisco
- Genres: Rock, psychedelic rock
- Length: 70:09
- Label: CMC International
- Producers: Paul Kantner; Marty Balin; Tom Flye

Jefferson Starship chronology
Deep Space / Virgin Sky (1995)	Windows of Heaven (1998)	Greatest Hits: Live at the Fillmore (1999)

Professional ratings
Review scores
Source	Rating
Allmusic	4/5 stars
Rock Brigade	4/10

Windows of Heaven is Jefferson Starship's first studio album since reforming in 1992 and ninth album overall. It was first released in Germany, but the band told fans to wait for a new American remixed version. The single "Let Me Fly" was released along with the American release, but did not chart on the Billboard charts. Grace Slick joined the band in the studio to record vocals on "I'm on Fire," which only appears on the American and Japanese versions. The track "Maybe for You" later reappeared on the 2008 album, Jefferson's Tree of Liberty, and the track "See the Light" originally appeared on Marty Balin's 1991 solo album Better Generation.

== German Version Track Listing (1998) ==
No.	Title	Writer(s)	Length
1.	"The Light (Ginger & Metaphysics)"	Paul Kantner	5:45
2.	"See the Light"	Jesse Barish	4:38
3.	"Borderlands"	Kantner	3:35
4.	"Maybe for You"	Terry Terrell	2:51
5.	"Let It Live"	Marty Balin	4:36
6.	"Let Me Fly"	Kantner	5:43

Acoustica Majora
No.	Title	Writer(s)	Length
7.	"Goddess"	Balin	4:12
8.	"Blessings"	Claudia Schmidt	3:10
9.	"Shadowlands"	Kantner	4:40
10.	"Which Side Are You On (FUTR2 Remembered)"	Kantner	3:49
11.	"Ways of Love"	Barish	4:10
12.	"Later On"	Balin	5:10

Alternate Quantum Thursdays
No.	Title	Writer(s)	Length
13.	"The Windows of Heaven (FUTR)"	Kantner	6:12
14.	"Out of the Rain"	Tony Joe White	5:08
15.	"Millennium Beyond (Frontera Luminosa)"	Kantner	7:58

== Official US/Japan Remixed Version Track Listing (1999) ==
No.	Title	Writer(s)	Length
1.	"The Light (Ginger & Metaphysics)"	Kantner	5:43
2.	"See the Light"	Jesse Barish	3:32
3.	"Borderlands"	Kantner	3:35
4.	"Ways of Love"	Barish	4:08
5.	"Later On"	Balin	5:09
6.	"Let Me Fly"	Kantner	5:33

Acoustica Majora
No.	Title	Writer(s)	Length
7.	"The Windows of Heaven (FUTR)"	Kantner	6:01
8.	"Shadowlands"	Kantner	4:30
9.	"I'm on Fire"	Kantner	3:25
10.	"Goddess"	Balin	4:14
11.	"Let It Live"	Balin	4:39

Alternate Quantum Thursdays
No.	Title	Writer(s)	Length
12.	"Millennium Beyond (Frontera Luminosa)"	Kantner	7:54
13.	"Yes Yes Yes" (Japan only)	Kazumasa Oda	5:15

== Singles ==
- "Let Me Fly"

== Personnel ==
- Marty Balin - vocals, acoustic guitar
- Jack Casady - bass
- Paul Kantner - vocals, acoustic and electric 12-String guitar, glass harmonica, synthesizer, banjo
- Diana Mangano - vocals
- Slick Aguilar - lead guitar
- T Lavitz - piano, synthesizer, Hammond B-3 organ
- Prairie Prince - drums and percussion, Celtic drum, electronic and alien percussion, marimba, rainstick

Additional personnel

- Darby Gould – lead vocals on "Shadowlands"
- Amy Excolere – supporting vocals on "Shadowlands"
- Grace Slick – co-lead vocals on "I'm on Fire"
- Tim Gorman – piano, synthesizer on "Shadowlands" and "Which Side Are You On?"
- Tony Menjivar – LP congas on "Let It Live", "Goddess" and "Later On"
- Alexander Kantner – additional guitar on "Let Me Fly"

=== Production ===
- Paul Kantner – producer
- Marty Balin – producer
- Tom Flye – producer
- Produced at Coast Recorders, San Francisco
- Michael Gaiman – executive producer
- Gary Veloric – executive producer
- James Delaney – executive producer on US / Japan version
- Ron Rainey – executive producer on US / Japan version
- Paul Stubblebine – mastering at Rocket Lab for German version
- George Horn – mastering at Fantasy Studios for US / Japan version
- Henry Howell – equipment manager
- Prairie Prince – art director, photography
- Diana Mangano – photography
- Mick Anger – computer art
