= Jude Gold =

American guitarist

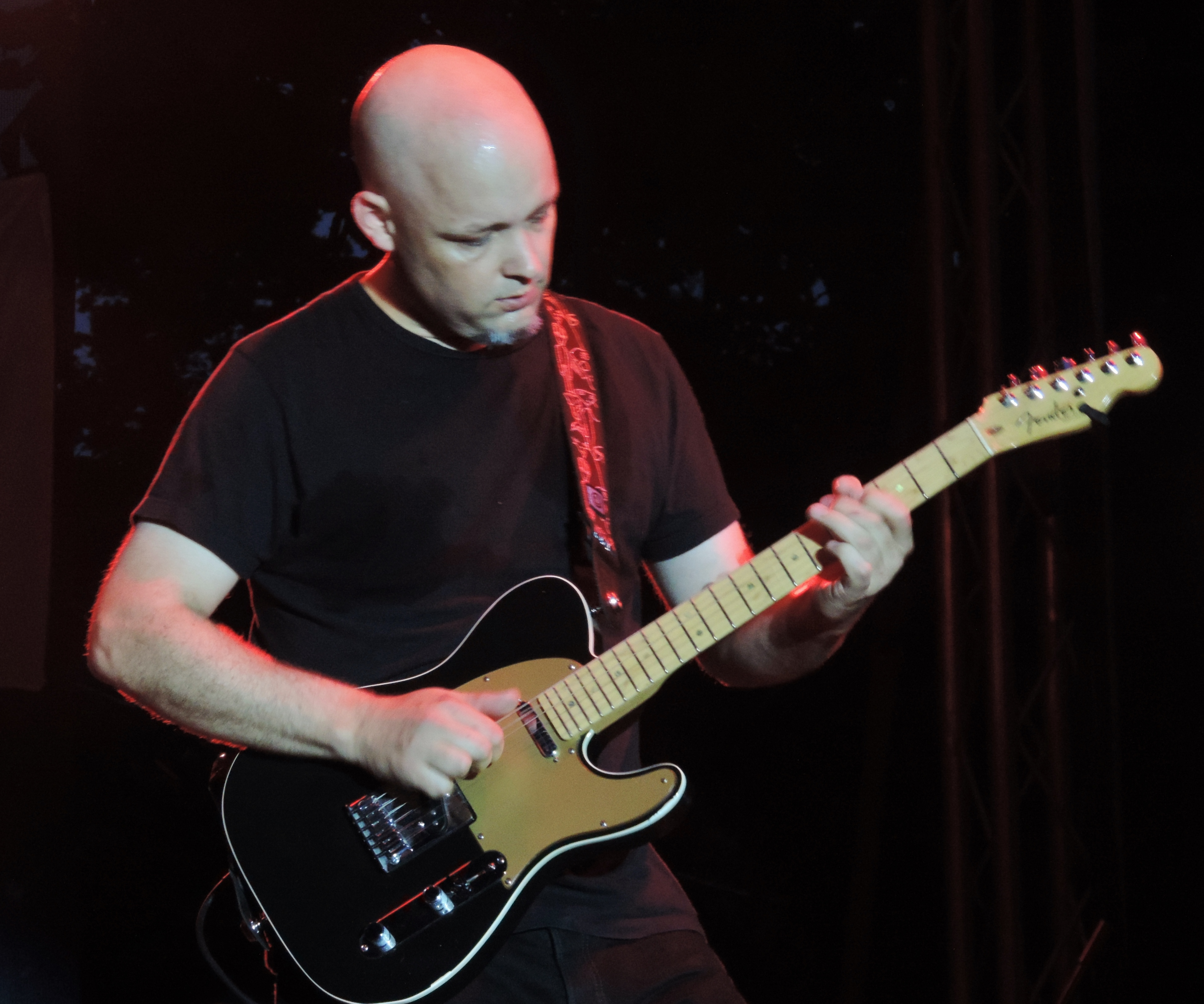
- Gold with Jefferson Starship in 2012

Background information
- Origin: Berkeley, California
- Genre: Rock
- Occupations: Los Angeles editor of Guitar Player magazine, musician
- Instrument: Guitar
- Years active: 1995–present
- Website: judegold.com

Jude Gold (also credited as Judah Gold) is an American guitarist who has toured with Jefferson Starship since 2012 and has toured with Kristin Chenoweth, JGB, Eddie Money, 2 Live Crew, Jeff Berlin, and more.

Gold has been the Los Angeles editor of Guitar Player magazine since 2001, with numerous cover stories to his credit.

== Career ==
Jude Gold is a graduate of the University of California, Berkeley. He has performed with Metallica's Kirk Hammett, 2 Live Crew, David Grisman and The String Cheese Incident. He has also toured with JGB (featuring Jerry Garcia Band members Melvin Seals, Donny Baldwin, Gloria Jones, and Jackie LaBranch) and Kristin Chenoweth. He also played with BX3, a group made up of bass players Stu Hamm, Jeff Berlin, and Billy Sheehan. His credits include playing on Miguel Migs' Outside the Skyline and Get Salted Vol. 2, as well as Hed Kandi's Beach House; Gold is also mentioned in the liner notes of Lee Ritenour's 6 String Theory.

In October 2012, Gold joined Jefferson Starship as lead guitarist. He has performed in Europe, Brazil, America, Japan, Mexico, Scandinavia, and Canada with the band Gold played guitar on the Academy Award-nominated documentary, Daughter from Danang.

Gold is a well-known guitar journalist, and the subjects of his writing and interviews include Steve Lukather, Third Eye Blind, Slash, Brad Paisley and many Guitar Player magazine "Master Classes" (a popular column of Guitar Player). Gold has also written for Relix, Rumble, Frets, and Bass Player magazines.

Gold is director of the Guitar Institute of Technology in Hollywood.

Since 2015, Gold has been the host of a guitar podcast called No Guitar Is Safe where he interviews famous guitarists while they are both playing guitars.

== Credits ==
- 2 Live Crew, Shake a Lil' Somethin' (Guitar)
- Miguel Migs, Outside the Skyline (Guitar)
- JGB, Welcome to our World (For Members Only) (Guitar)
- Lee Ritenour, 6 String Theory (Liner Notes)
- Hed Kandi, Beach House (Guitar)
- Miguel Migs, Get Salted, Vol. 2 (Guitar) *Miguel Migs, Those Things (Guitar) *Stuart Hamm, Outbound (Guitar) *Stuart Hamm, Live Stu x 2 (Guitar) *Stuart Hamm, Just Outside of Normal (Guitar)
