= Modern Times (Jefferson Starship album) =

Studio album by Jefferson Starship
- Released: April 2, 1981
- Recorded: 1980–1981 at the Record Plant, Los Angeles and Sausalito
- Genre: Rock
- Length: 38:26
- Label: Grunt
- Producer: Ron Nevison

Jefferson Starship chronology
Freedom at Point Zero (1979)	Modern Times (1981)	Winds of Change (1982)

Professional ratings
Review scores
Source	Rating
AllMusic	3/5 stars

Modern Times is the sixth album by Jefferson Starship and was released in 1981. Grace Slick appeared on this album after a three-year absence. She returned near the end of the recording sessions, providing background vocals on some tracks as well as lead vocals on the single "Stranger" as a duet with lead singer Mickey Thomas. "Stranger" had previously been performed live by Jefferson Starship as early as December 1979, and the first studio version was made for Modern Times. Although not appearing in the band picture on the gatefold cover, Slick is listed on the back cover of the LP with the credit "Introducing Grace Slick" and her picture is on the lyric sleeve with the note "Grace Slick courtesy of Grace Slick." She joined the band officially for the 1981 tour. This was the first Jefferson Starship album to have promotional music videos. It was also the first album to feature a charting single on the Mainstream Rock Tracks chart, which had premiered earlier in the year. The single "Find Your Way Back" reached No. 3 on the Mainstream Rock chart and #29 at Billboard's Hot 100, while second single "Stranger" was #48 and third "Save Your Love" failed to enter Hot 100 peaking at #104.

The song "Stairway to Cleveland" was inspired by a harsh review that Rolling Stone had given the album Freedom at Point Zero, inspiring Paul Kantner to wrap lyrics around a phrase he had heard from Paul Warren: "Fuck you! We do what we want!"

== Track listing ==
Side one
No.	Title	Lyrics	Music	Length
1.	"Find Your Way Back"	Craig Chaquico	Chaquico, Tom Borsdorf	4:15
2.	"Stranger"	Jeannette Sears	Pete Sears	4:44
3.	"Wild Eyes (Angel)"	Paul Kantner	Kantner	4:02
4.	"Save Your Love"	J. Sears	P. Sears	5:58

Side two
No.	Title	Lyrics	Music	Length
5.	"Modern Times"	Kantner, Mickey Thomas	Kantner	2:36
6.	"Mary"	J. Sears, Chaquico	Chaquico	3:37
7.	"Free"	Thomas, Chaquico	Chaquico	4:34
8.	"Alien"	J. Sears	P. Sears	4:42
9.	"Stairway to Cleveland (We Do What We Want)"	Kantner, Paul Warren	Kantner	3:58

== Personnel ==
- Mickey Thomas – lead (all tracks) and backing vocals, spoken word (9)
- Paul Kantner – lead (9) and backing vocals, rhythm guitar, Oberheim Eight Voice synthesizer (9), keyboards (2), spoken word (9)
- Craig Chaquico – lead guitar, rhythm guitar, synthesizer (1, 6, 7), steel drums (6), spoken word (9)
- David Freiberg – bass (1, 6, 8), piano (2), synthesizer (2, 5), organ (3), backing vocals, spoken word (9)
- Pete Sears – bass (2–5, 7, 9), piano (1, 3, 4, 8), synthesizer (2, 4, 8), Moog (8)
- Aynsley Dunbar – drums, percussion, marimba (6), synthesizer (7)
- Grace Slick – co-lead vocals (2), backing vocals (3, 4, 8, 9)

=== Production ===
- Ron Nevison – producer for Gadget Productions, Inc., engineer
- Michael Clink – engineer
- Mike Reese – mastering
- Pat Ieraci (Maurice) – production coordinator
- Bill Murphy / Rod Dyer, Inc. – album design, art direction
- Ryoko Ishioka – cover concept
- Monica Clemans – cover model and eyes
- Leon LeCash – photography
- Recorded and mixed at The Record Plant, Los Angeles - Sausalito
- Mastered at The Mastering Lab, Hollywood

== Singles / music videos ==
- "Find Your Way Back" (1981) #29 US
- "Stranger" (1981) #48 US
- "Save Your Love" (1981) #104 US (single only / no music video)
- "Stairway to Cleveland" (1981) (promo single only)

== Charts ==
=== Weekly charts ===
Chart (1981)	Peak position
Australian albums (Kent Music Report)	84
Canada Top Albums/CDs (RPM)	15
US Billboard 200	26

=== Year-end charts ===
Chart (1981)	Peak position
US Billboard 200	47

== Certifications ==
Region	Certification	Certified units/sales
United States (RIAA)	Gold	500,000^{^}
^{^} Shipments figures based on certification alone.
