= The Jerky Boys (soundtrack) =

The Jerky Boys (Original Motion Picture Soundtrack)

Soundtrack album to The Jerky Boys: The Movie by various artists
- Released: January 24, 1995
- Genres: Hip Hop; rock
- Length: 39:05
- Labels: Select; Atlantic
- Producers: Andrew Leary (exec.); Anita Camarata (exec.); Andy Ernst; Bryan "Wino" Dobbs; Ed Roland; DJ Lethal; DJ Hurricane; Helmet; Lenny Kravitz; Michael Barbiero; Randy Cantor; RZA; Superchunk

Various artists chronology
The Jerky Boys 2 (1994)	The Jerky Boys (Original Motion Picture Soundtrack) (1995)	The Jerky Boys 3 (1996)

Professional ratings
Review scores
Source	Rating
AllMusic	3/5 stars

The Jerky Boys (Original Motion Picture Soundtrack) is the original soundtrack album of the 1995 James Melkonian's film The Jerky Boys: The Movie. It was released on January 24, 1995, via Select/Atlantic Records.

== Track listing ==
No.	Title	Writer(s)	Producer(s)	Length
1.	"Accordions & Keyboards" (performed by The Jerky Boys)	John G. Brennan
2.	"Gel" (performed by Collective Soul)	Edgar Eugene Roland, Jr.	Ed Roland
3.	"2,000 Light Years Away" (performed by Green Day)	Billie Joe Armstrong; Michael Ryan Pritchard; Frank Edwin Wright III	Andy Ernst
4.	"Dial a Jam" (performed by Coolio & 40 Thevz)	Artis Ivey; Malieek Straughter; Henry Straughter; William Bronson; Bryan Dobbs; J.B. Moore; Robert Ford; Kurt Walker; Russell Simmons; Lawrence Smith	Bryan "Wino" Dobbs
5.	"Shallow End" (performed by Superchunk)	Ralph Lee McCaughan; Laura Ballance; Jon Wurster; James Wilbur	Superchunk
6.	"Four Fly Guys" (performed by Hurricane & Beastie Boys)	Adam Horovitz; Adam Yauch; Michael Diamond; Wendell Fite; Mario Caldato Jr.; D. Fromback	DJ Hurricane
7.	"Are You Gonna Go My Way" (performed by Tom Jones)	Leonard Kravitz	Lenny Kravitz
8.	"Hanging on the Telephone" (performed by L7)	Jack Lee	Michael Barbiero
9.	"Beef Jerky" (performed by House of Pain)	Erik Schrody; Leor Dimant	DJ Lethal
10.	"Symptom of the Universe" (performed by Helmet)	Terence Michael Joseph Butler; Anthony Frank Iommi; John Michael Osbourne; William Thomas Ward	Helmet
11.	"Dirty Dancing / "You Got Me Sick as a Dog"" (performed by Wu-Tang Clan / performed by The Jerky Boys)	Russell Jones; Clifford Smith; Robert Diggs; /: Brennan; Kamal Ahmed; Randy Cantor; Ronnie Vance	RZA / Randy Cantor

=== Other songs ===
These songs did appear in the film but were not included on the soundtrack:

- "The Jerky Boys Sample" written by John G. Brennan and performed by the Jerky Boys
- "Hard Hats" and "The Jerky Groove" written by Derrick Perkins and performed by Perkins and Paul Karpinski
- "The Swing Thing" written by George Romanis
- "Neopolitan Mandolin" written by Alessandro Alessandroni

== Charts ==
Chart (1995)	Peak position
US Billboard 200	79
