= The Jerky Boys: The Movie =

1995 film by James Melkonian

- Theatrical Release Poster
- Directed by: James Melkonian
- Written by: James Melkonian; Rich Wilkes; John G. Brennan; Kamal Ahmed
- Produced by: Roger Birnbaum; Joe Roth
- Starring: Johnny Brennan; Kamal Ahmed; Alan Arkin
- Cinematography: Ueli Steiger
- Edited by: Dennis M. Hill
- Music by: Ira Newborn
- Production companies: Touchstone Pictures (Note: Credited in the copyright notice; logo is not shown on the film or any promotional material.); Caravan Pictures
- Distributed by: Buena Vista Pictures Distribution
- Release date: February 3, 1995 (U.S.)
- Running time: 81 minutes
- Country: United States
- Language: English
- Budget: $8 million
- Box office: $7.6 million

The Jerky Boys: The Movie, also known as The Jerky Boys, is a 1995 American crime/comedy film starring Johnny Brennan and Kamal Ahmed, best known as the comedy duo the Jerky Boys.

The film features two men, Johnny B. and Kamal, aka "the Jerky Boys", two self-described "low-lifes from Queens", who get into trouble with the Mafia when one of their prank calls leads them into a money laundering business. The Jerky Boys discover that their long-loved hometown bar will be torn down unless they stop their shenanigans.

The Jerky Boys: The Movie was released by Buena Vista Pictures Distribution on February 3, 1995. The film received negative reviews from critics and grossed $7.6 million against an $8 million budget.

== Plot ==
In a New York police station, Johnny B. and Kamal are taken into police custody and interrogated by Detective Robert Worzic. Worzic demands to know how the pair ended up in custody. Johnny explains that for the past twenty years, he and Kamal frequently made prank calls. He brings up call as a child where he got his neighbor Brett Weir in trouble with his mother by impersonating an angry citizen and claiming that Brett has been stealing, spitting and cursing.

Presently, Johnny and Kamal are adults and still performing prank calls, but Johnny's mother Mrs. B demands that they get jobs, and compares them to Brett Weir, who is now very successful.

Johnny and Kamal decide to head to Mickey's, their local bar, to drink. They meet Brett, who buys them drinks and brags that he is on his way to a meeting at a fancy restaurant. Curious, Johnny calls Brett's new friends at the restaurant as "Frank Rizzo" and rudely tells the caller that "his men" Johnny and Kamal have just gotten in from Chicago and need care. Unbeknownst to the pair, Brett's friends are actually the local Mafia run by Ernie Lazzaro, who is confused and bewildered at "Rizzo" and his vulgarity but nonetheless gives the boys a limousine ride and meal.

Johnny calls again as "Rizzo" the next day and demands another good time for him and Kamal. This time, Lazzaro and his right-hand man Tony Scarboni introduce the pair to the many Mafia leaders and officials on their payroll. They are given an advance before their first assignment: beat up Mickey so the mob can tear down his bar. As Johnny and Kamal try to convince Mickey to lie low, Brett recognizes them and reveals to Lazzaro that they are not mobsters. Scarboni's men Geno and Sonny later grab Johnny and Kamal and take them to a hot dog-processing plant so Scarboni can run them through the grinder. The boys distract their captors and escape. Johnny and Kamal lead the men through the city, creating chaos along the way. After making it to Johnny's house, the two are arrested by Worzic for all the trouble they caused.

Returning to the present situation, Johnny and Kamal profess their innocence to Worzic and try to tell him of Lazzaro's many rackets in the city. Worzic, however, only cares about "Frank Rizzo", revealed to be an actual mob boss, and throws the boys in a cell. They are each given one phone call: Johnny calls his mother, who is threatened by Scarboni to tell them where he is, while Kamal calls a local demolition crew. They are later released on bail and picked up by Scarboni's who take them to Lazzaro and Scarboni, who are now fitting Mrs. B with cement shoes. Johnny insists that "Frank Rizzo" can set everything straight and calls his house, where he had previously set up a tape-recording of "Rizzo" to play on the answering machine. Though it seems to work well enough to make Lazzaro brag about his operation, Brett sees through the deception and the rest of the mob chase after the boys and Mrs. B.

Barely making it back to Queens, Johnny and Kamal immediately call Worzic and tells them that they have taped evidence to incriminate Lazzaro. Instead, the detective reveals he works for Lazzaro, and joins Lazzaro in chasing the boys. They are distracted when Lazzaro recognizes the next-door neighbor Uncle Freddie as a Mafia boss from long ago. The boys use this to escape and call multiple news outlets with their evidence that exposes Lazzaro. They credit "Frank Rizzo" as the informant, who in turn credits Johnny and Kamal as "The Jerky Boys".

Lazzaro, Scarboni, Worzic, and all their accomplices are arrested, while Johnny and Kamal are made heroes and given a cushy office job in a high-rise building. Not surprisingly, they start off by prank calling the White House and demanding to know who's in charge. Meanwhile, Brett Weir has just gotten out of prison after making a deal with prosecutors, only to see his house getting torn down by the demolition crew Kamal called.

== Cast ==
- Johnny Brennan as himself, one of the two prank callers.
  - David Klein as Young Johnny
- Kamal Ahmed as himself, one of the two prank callers.
  - Coach Cox as Young Kamal
- Alan Arkin as Ernie Lazzaro, a powerful mob boss whom the prank callers get tangled up with.
- Vincent Pastore as Tony Scarboni, Lazarro's right-hand man.
- Brian Tarantina as Geno, Scarboni's bumbling underling.
- Peter Appel as Sonny, Scarboni's bumbling underling.
- Brad Sullivan as Robert Worzic, a detective who is trying to bring a fictional "Frank Rizzo" down
- James Lorinz as Brett Weir, Johnny's weaselly mob-connected neighbor. A victim to the Jerky Boys.
  - Christopher Conte as Young Brett
- Suzanne Shepherd as Mrs. B, Johnny's long-suffering mother.
- William Hickey as Uncle Freddy, Johnny's Neighbor, seemingly a harmless old kook but really an old-time mob boss
- Alan North as Mickey, who owns the bar that Johnny B. and Kamal frequent.
- Joe Lisi as Construction Foreman, a construction worker, who fires Johnny and Kamal.
- Ron Ostrow as Burger Bob customer, ordering lunch at Burger Bob's drive through.
- Ozzy Osbourne as Band Manager, for heavy metal band Helmet.
- Henry Bogdan as himself, Helmet's bassist
- Rob Echeverria as himself, Helmet's guitarist
- Page Hamilton as himself, Helmet's guitarist, singer/songwriter
- John Stanier as himself, Helmet's drummer
- Tom Jones as himself

== Production and delay of release ==
In 1993 after the release of the first Jerky Boys album, it was announced producers Joe Roth and Roger Birnbaum's production company Caravan Pictures had negotiated a deal with Johnny B. and Kamal for a proposed Jerky Boys film. Roth signed the duo to a movie deal after listening to a Jerky Boys tape brought in by Jonathan Glickman, who at the time was a USC student interning at Caravan. Roth loved it, signed the Boys to a movie deal, and soon thereafter made Glickman a junior exec at Caravan. Roth said of the film:

I thought it was hysterical, and I feel there’s a movie in there. The guys could be the ’90s Cheech and Chong. No one’s ever seen their faces, but they’re going to be in the film. Our job is to weave a storyline around what they do.

The film was shot between April and June 1994 in New York City, under the direction of James Melkonian. The project's distributor, Buena Vista, originally planned to release the film in 1994 but the release was delayed until after the release of the second Jerky Boys album. The film was released theatrically on February 3, 1995 by Buena Vista through its Touchstone Pictures label. The copyright date of this movie is 1994 and the same date appears on the disc and back cover of the soundtrack.

== Home media ==
The Jerky Boys was initially released by Touchstone Home Video on VHS on March 5, 1996. A widescreen LaserDisc was also released by Touchstone Home Video. The first (and only) release on DVD was in March 2004 in Europe and the United Kingdom. The Jerky Boys movie became available for streaming via iTunes and Amazon, as of early 2012.

== Reception ==
The film received mostly negative reviews. On review aggregator website Rotten Tomatoes, the film holds an approval rating of 15%, based on 13 reviews, and an average rating of 3.3/10. Being a significant part of the Jerky Boys' career, it has a cult following among Jerky Boys fans, which Johnny Brennan discussed at length on his late podcast.
