= The Jerky Boys 4 =

Studio album by The Jerky Boys
- Released: October 7, 1997
- Genre: Comedy, prank calls
- Length: 56:33
- Label: Mercury Records
- Producer: John G. Brennan; Kamal Ahmed; The Jerky Boys

The Jerky Boys chronology
The Jerky Boys 3 (1996)	The Jerky Boys 4 (1997)	Stop Staring at Me! (1999)

Professional ratings
Review scores
Source	Rating
Allmusic	3/5 stars

Jerky Boys 4 is the fourth comedy album by prank call artists, the Jerky Boys, and the second album released on Mercury Records. The album was released in 1997 (see 1997 in music).

This album was released with both a "clean" and "explicit" edition.

== Track listing ==
1. "Cold Feet – Frank Rizzo" (1:28)
2. "The Need To Dance – Jack Tors" (2:45)
3. "Sol's Thermometer Mishap – Sol Rosenberg" (1:06)
4. "Testing For Jeopardy – Frank Rizzo" (4:22)
5. "Dead Pet Removal – Mike Derucki" (:57)
6. "Little Elves – Tarbash" (3:16)
7. "I'm A Diva – Jack Tor s" (1:55)
8. "Boats Express – Frank Rizzo" (1:54)
9. "Hey Sir! – Sol Rosenberg" (1:28)
10. "Kissel Sails – Kissel w/Wife" (2:17)
11. "Herman – Sammy Cox" (2:03)
12. "Rizzo The Rainmaker – Frank Rizzo" (2:40)
13. "Bacon – Jack Tor s" (:26)
14. "Food & Drug Complaint – Sol Rosenberg" (2:37)
15. "Hello Ray (The Phone Man) – Mike Derucki" (3:01)
16. "A Little Information – Jack Tor s" (:49)
17. "Trains – Jocko Johnson" (4:10)
18. "Mining For Scotty – Frank Rizzo" (2:54)
19. "Mariposa – Pico" (2:19)
20. "Spider Monkey – Jack Tor s" (2:18)
21. "Truck Registration – Frank Rizzo" (2:19)
22. "Sol's Turnstile – Sol Rosenberg" (2:53)
23. "Laundromat – Frank Puma" (3:16)
24. "Jerk Baby Jerk (Bass Mix) – the Jerky Boys" (3:13)
