= The Jerky Tapes =

Studio album by Jerky Boys
- Released: April 10, 2001
- Genre: Comedy, prank calls
- Length: 63:14
- Label: Laugh.com
- Producer: John G. Brennan

Jerky Boys chronology
Stop Staring at Me! (1999)	The Jerky Tapes (2001)	Sol's Rusty Trombone (2007)

The Jerky Tapes is the sixth comedy album by prank call artists, the Jerky Boys. The album was released in 2001, and is the first Jerky Boys album to be released by the independent Laugh.com record label.

The Jerky Tapes is also the final Jerky Boys album with Kamal Ahmed, as the duo broke up prior to the release of this album.

== Track listing ==
No.	Title	Length
1.	"Flower Lady #1"	8:04
2.	"Flower Lady #2"	12:14
3.	"Silverman Baby!!"	5:52
4.	"Flower Lady #3"	6:11
5.	"Bright"	4:26
6.	"Make Air Not War"	4:49
7.	"Moonlight Matinee"	6:03
8.	"What’s Wrong With This World!?"	10:02
9.	"Flower Lady #4"	5:28
