= The Best of The Jerky Boys =

The Best of the Jerky Boys

Compilation album by The Jerky Boys
- Released: October 22, 2002
- Recorded: 1992–1996
- Genre: Prank calls
- Label: Select Records

The Jerky Boys chronology
The Best of the Jerky Boys (2002)	The Ultimate Jerky Boys (2004)

The Best of the Jerky Boys is an enhanced, comedy compact disc compilation album by prank call artists, the Jerky Boys. The album was released on the Select Records label on October 22, 2002.

== Track listing ==
1. "Far East Record Store" (:34)
2. "Sol's Nude Beach" (2:30)
3. "Dental Malpractice" (3:17)
4. "Diamond Dealer" (1:59)
5. "Sushi Chef" (:57)
6. "A Little Emergency" (1:09)
7. "Sol's Phobia" (3:01)
8. "Fava Beans" (1:39)
9. "Punitive Damages" (2:07)
10. "Gay Hard Hat" (1:32)
11. "Car Salesman" (2:14)
12. "Sol's Glasses" (2:52)
13. "Pablo Honey" (:45)
14. "Uncle Freddie" (2:58)
15. "Cremation Services" (1:46)
16. "Breast Enlargement" (2:22)
17. "Laser Surgery" (:40)
18. "Auto Mechanic" (2:04)
19. "Security Service" (3:52)
20. "Roofing" (2:44)
21. "Gay Model" (3:17)
22. "Starter Motor Repair" (1:35)
23. "Sol's Record Purchase" (:59)
24. "Irate Tile Man" (:55)
25. "Hurt at Work" (1:32)
26. "Mattress King" (1:57)
27. "Hot Rod Mover" (2:06)
28. "Sex Therapy" (1:50)
29. "Sol's Dating Tips" (:37)
30. "Beauty Tips by Jack Tors" (:52)
31. "Car Trouble" (:32)
32. "Disappearing Pyramids" (:41)
33. "Nerves" (:54)
34. "Self Defense" (1:51)
35. "Weather Tips" (:42)
36. "The Jerky Jam" (5:35)
37. "You Got Me Sick as a Dog" (3:27)
38. "Uncle Freddie - The Jam" (6:18)
39. "Super Across the Way" (multimedia track)
