= Once a Jerk, Always a Jerk =

Studio album by Kamal Ahmed
- Released: April 4, 2000
- Genre: Comedy, prank calls
- Length: 69:11
- Label: Deep South Records

Once a Jerk, Always a Jerk is the debut solo comedy album by prank call artist Kamal Ahmed, former member of the Jerky Boys. The album was released in 2000, shortly after Kamal's departure from the Jerky Boys. The album was released by the independent Deep South Records label.

In addition to prank calls, the album features four comedy skits by Kamal.

== Track listing ==
- All tracks by Kamal Ahmed.
1. "Kissel Photographer" – 0:40
2. "Dangerfield at Million Man March" (Skit) – 2:14
3. "Chinese Restaurant" – 1:22
4. "Fruit Bowl..." – 1:09
5. "Gayfella's Godfather" (Skit) – 5:03
6. "Pit Bull" – 6:20
7. "Arab & Kostelowitz" (Skit) – 2:25
8. "Fat Removal" – 2:10
9. "Irish Bar" – 1:54
10. "Spanish Lessons" – 1:53
11. "X-Rated Hotel" – 4:07
12. "Degenerate Dating Game" (Skit) – 6:53
13. "Piano Lessons" – 2:11
14. "Howard Stern Show" – 8:25
15. "I'm an Angel (Dance Loop) / Freezer for Sale" – 12:31
