= Crazy Eyes (disambiguation) =

Crazy Eyes is a 1973 album by Poco, or the title song.

Crazy Eyes may also refer to:

- Crazy Eyes (film), a 2012 film
- Crazy Eyes (Filter album), 2016

== People/characters ==
- Crazy Eyes (character), Suzanne "Crazy Eyes" Warren, a character from Orange Is the New Black played by Uzo Aduba
- A character from the 2002 Adam Sandler film Mr. Deeds played by Steve Buscemi

== Songs ==
- Song from the 1976 Hall & Oates album Bigger Than Both of Us
- Song from the 1981 Don McLean album Believers
- Song from the 1998 Show-Ya album This My Way
- Song by Dave's True Story, featured in the 2001 film Kissing Jessica Stein
- Track from the 2007 The Jerky Boys comedy album Sol's Rusty Trombone
- Song from the 2008 Old Crow Medicine Show, album Tennessee Pusher
