= The Jerky Boys 2 =

Studio album by The Jerky Boys
- Released: August 16, 1994
- Genre: Comedy, prank calls
- Length: 48:44
- Label: Select Records
- Producer: John G. Brennan; Kamal Ahmed; The Jerky Boys

The Jerky Boys chronology
The Jerky Boys (1993)	The Jerky Boys 2 (1994)	The Jerky Boys 3 (1996)

Professional ratings
Review scores
Source	Rating
AllMusic	3/5 stars
Entertainment Weekly	A−

Jerky Boys 2 is the second comedy album released by prank call artists, the Jerky Boys. The album was released on August 16, 1994, and was the final Jerky Boys album released on the Select Records label, distributed by Atlantic Records. Like their debut album, it also went Platinum. This album was also nominated for a Grammy Award in 1995 for Best Spoken Comedy Album, but lost to Sam Kinison's Live From Hell.

== Track listing ==
1. "Pablo Honey" (0:39)
2. "Drinking Problem" (1:44)
3. "Pet Cobra" (0:57)
4. "Sol's Warts" (1:46)
5. "Breast Enlargement" (2:17)
6. "Roofing" (2:39)
7. "Gay Hairdresser" (2:00)
8. "Volunteer" (1:50)
9. "Terrorist Pizza" (2:40)
10. "Pico's Mexican Hairpiece" (2:38)
11. "A Little Emergency" (1:05)
12. "Sparky The Clown" (1:56)
13. "Security Service" (3:48)
14. "Sol's Nude Beach" (2:25)
15. "Diamond Dealer" (1:55)
16. "Sol's Naked Photo" (1:25)
17. "The Mattress King" (1:52)
18. "Ball Game Beating" (2:52)
19. "Sporting Goods" (1:10)
20. "Scaffolding" (1:05)
21. "Sex Therapy" (1:45)
22. "Sol's Phobia" (2:56)
23. "Cremation Services" (1:42)
24. "Pizza Lawyer" (2:41)
25. "Fava Beans" (1:34)
26. "Husband Beating" (1:23)
27. "*Bonus Track" (0:06)

== Trivia ==
English rock band Radiohead named their 1993 debut album, Pablo Honey, after the first call on this album (apparently having heard it on a bootleg tape), well before release of this material on CD.

California Punk band Nofx released a live album called "I Heard They Suck Live!!", in which the guitar player (El Hefe), impersonates a part of "Sol's Warts" in between songs.
