= Touch-Tone Terrorists =

Prank callers

Touch-Tone Terrorists is a series of CDs featuring prank phone calls, released from 1998 to 2015.

== About ==
The Touch-Tone Terrorists are actually one man, Pete Dzoghi, who also goes by the name RePete. He purchased a series of 1-800 numbers, including ones that were one digit different from actual customer service numbers for companies such as (apparently) UPS, an oil change business, an auto insurance "claims support line", a psychic hotline, a pen manufacturer, a bank, a department store, a phone company, and others. Using a Gentner SPH-3A telephone hybrid and a Yamaha SPX-90 electronic pitch transposer to alter his voice over the phone, he would take incoming calls from people who had misdialed the number and were under the assumption that they had dialed the right number. He created a series of ridiculous exaggerated characters, all of which were voiced by him.

Several Touch-Tone Terrorists calls were featured on Crank Yankers on Comedy Central and MTV2, most notably the Yankerville Parcel Service calls.

At one point UPS tried to stop the sale of the Touch-Tone Terrorists CDs through a series of letters demanding, among other things, that all inventory of Infestation Records' CDs be "delivered" to UPS lawyers "for destruction", because UPS believed that many of the TTT calls involved customers who thought they were speaking to UPS customer service representatives. Infestation Records refused to comply on the basis that the CDs are a protected parody and the calls were recorded legally. RePete consulted with several attorneys regarding various legal issues to make sure that what he was doing was within legal grounds. All subjects gave their permission to have their voices on the CDs, and were "paid well."

Pete Dzoghi was also a frequent guest on Howard Stern's radio show, once in person, but usually called upon to crank call Howard Stern staff and Wack Pack members, such as Crazy Alice and High Pitch Eric. When Howard Stern first began airing Touch-Tone Terrorists, the album A Permanent Lapse of Reason peaked as high as No. 5 on Amazon.com's hot 100 albums.

RePete says he has retired from recording prank calls, as he claims the process of recording and releasing the calls as well as dealing with illegal file sharing of his tracks require over two years of full-time work. When the fifth album, Customer Care Creeps, was released, RePete also recorded an alternative, staged version of the calls in which he himself voiced the caller's voices. Many people thought these fake calls were the actual album, but RePete stated that the staged calls were not the real album but rather those that were propagated on illegal P2P file-sharing networks. RePete also says on his website that he can no longer legally record the calls that he used to record due to changes in the law in his home state of California.

== Characters ==
- Junkyard Willie Robinson: A gravelly-voiced African-American man with a bad attitude. He is known for launching off into litanies of curse words and Ebonics, then filibustering during the arguments that ensue. He frequently threatens to "pee in yo gas tank" and tells customers to "calm yo ass down!" Also often uses variations of phrases that include "jive turkey", "talkin' trash", and "old bag". Willie is from Compton, California, and used to be an operator of a junkyard where he would shine hubcaps. Also allows customers to call him "one-eye Willie." According to at least one tirade against an irate customer, he claims to have been a Drill instructor in the Army.
- Jim Bob the Handicapped Hillbilly: A stuttering mentally challenged hillbilly in a wheelchair with poor customer service skills and a low IQ. He insults customers with phrases like "bird brain", "lunkhead" and "city slicker".
- Blade Jones the Drunk Guy: A raging alcoholic, he readily admits to customers that he regularly uses drugs and alcohol at work. He often vomits while customers are on the phone ("Sorry, I just had a little too much to drink"), and calls prospective employers looking for a job.
- Stu Jaimison the Big Shot: The arrogant, corporate big shot. He is unsympathetic to disgruntled customers, frequently telling callers that they are "a drop in the bucket" to his company.
- Joe: The nice guy. Irate customers will often complain to him because he has sympathetic ear, after which he will "transfer" the call to Jim Bob or Junkyard Willie, sometimes cyclically until the caller becomes sufficiently exasperated and hangs up. Joe usually consoles the customers, often telling them "You deserve better service than this", before transferring them again.
- Vladimir: A rude Russian who gets under people's skin ("You sound like stupid American").
- Old Man Louie Pellagrini: A senile 90-something-year-old ("I love booze and broads"). Known for attempting to get booze delivered to his hospital room, calling to get a ride back to the retirement home from a strip bar, or calling in search of his lost colostomy bag.
- Tic-Tac the Low Calorie Loco: A Mexican-American who annoys customers by interrupting them in Spanglish.
- Clarence Washington: An Ebonics talking African-American man who talks a lot of "mumbo jumbo".

== The CDs and DVD ==
- Appetite For Disruption: This is the first CD in the series. Released in 1998, it features 18 outbound prank calls.
- A Permanent Lapse of Reason: This is the second CD in the series. Released in 1999, it is the first CD in the series to feature inbound prank calls. This CD has a total of 21 calls, 5 of which were inbound.
- Customer Service Disasters: This is the third CD in the series originally released in 2000 and contains 16 calls. This CD was re-released in 2005 with 2 new calls and new cover art. By popular demand 17 of the 18 calls feature inbound (wrong number) calls for various businesses.
- Customer Service Crackpots: This is the fourth CD in the series, released in 2002. This is the first CD in the series that does not go by the name Touch-Tone Terrorists. It appeared under the name The Junkyard Willie Prank Call Tapes 4 due to its release shortly after the September 11 attacks. This CD features 22 prank calls.
- The Junkyard Willie Movie: Lost In Transit: A straight-to-DVD movie based loosely on the Touch-Tone Terrorists characters. The film, released in 2008, includes one new prank call.
- Customer Care Creeps: This is the 5th CD in the series, was released in two parts in 2009 and 2015 and contains 16 calls.

== See also ==
- Caller ID spoofing
- Roy D. Mercer
- The Jerky Boys
- Tube Bar prank calls
- Longmont Potion Castle
- The Wack Pack
- List of practical joke topics
