= The Ultimate Jerky Boys Collection =

The Ultimate Jerky Boys

Compilation album by The Jerky Boys
- Released: October 24, 2004
- Recorded: 1992–1996
- Genre: Prank calls
- Label: Select

The Jerky Boys chronology
| The Best of the Jerky Boys (2002) | The Ultimate Jerky Boys (2004) |

Professional ratings
Review scores
| Source | Rating |
|---|---|
| Allmusic | 4/5 stars |

The Ultimate Jerky Boys is a double-disc compilation album by the Jerky Boys. It was released on October 26, 2004.

== Track listing ==
=== Disc one ===
1. "Sol's Civil War Memorabilia"
2. "Sol's Civil War Memorabilia (Part 2)"
3. "Piano Tuner"
4. "Uncle Freddie"
5. "Unemployed Painter"
6. "Laser Surgery"
7. "Insulator Job"
8. "The Gay Model"
9. "The Home Wrecker"
10. "Egyptian Magician"
11. "Sol's Glasses"
12. "Bad Tomatoes"
13. "Car Salesman"
14. "Sushi Chef"
15. "Super Across The Way"
16. "Auto Mechanic"
17. "Dental Malpractice"
18. "Starter Motor Repair"
19. "Hurt At Work"
20. "Hot Rod Mover"
21. "Firecracker Mishap"
22. "Irate Tile Man"
23. "Punitive Damage"
24. "Gay Hard Hat"

=== Disc two ===
1. "Sol's Naked Photo"
2. "Ball Game Beating"
3. "Pizza Lawyer"
4. "Sol's Nude Beach"
5. "Drinking Problem"
6. "Pet Cobra"
7. "Sol's Warts"
8. "Breast Enlargement"
9. "Roofing"
10. "Gay Hairdresser"
11. "Volunteer"
12. "Terrorist Pizza"
13. "Pico's Mexican Hairpiece"
14. "A Little Emergency"
15. "Sparky The Clown"
16. "Security Services"
17. "Diamond Dealer"
18. "Pablo Honey"
19. "The Mattress King"
20. "Sporting Goods"
21. "Scaffolding"
22. "Sex Therapy"
23. "Sol's Phobia"
24. "Cremation Services"
25. "Fava Beans"
26. "Husband Beating"
