= Inner Four =

Software company, produces iPhone apps

Inner Four, Inc.
- Type: Corporation
- Industry: Computer software
- Founder: David Rajala; John Swartz
- Headquarters: Tampa, Florida, United States
- Area served: Worldwide
- Key people: John Swartz (President)
- Products: Mobile app
- Website: http://www.innerfour.com

Inner Four, Inc. was a software company that developed a wide range of mobile apps, with a focus on the Apple iPhone.

The company was founded July 2007 as an internet marketing firm. The company spun off an IPv6 network management tools division at the end of 2007 doing business as 3dSNMP. Since the launch of the Apple iPhone in 2008, the company has shifted nearly all of its resources to iPhone Mobile app development.

May 2009 Inner Four's app for the Apple iPhone and iPod Touch, titled Weird Laws, achieved the #1 overall free ranked download position in the Apple iTunes App Store.

July 2009 Inner Four's app for the Apple iPhone and iPod Touch, titled Mirror Free, achieved the #1 overall free ranked download position in the Apple iTunes App Store. Amazingly, the company's own President admits the app doesn't actually do anything, and was intended as a joke. Unfortunately for the company, much of the early advertising revenue that would have been generated from ads in this app were lost due to a coding error.

September 2009 Inner Four's app for the Apple iPhone and iPod Touch, titled Finger Security, achieved the #1 overall free ranked download position in the Apple iTunes App Store.

March 2010 Inner Four and The Jerky Boys jointly announce two apps for the Apple iPhone and iPod Touch, titled The Jerky Boys Prank Caller and The Jerky Boys Pinball.
