= The Jerky Boys (album) =

Studio album by The Jerky Boys
- Released: March 1, 1993
- Genre: Prank calls
- Length: 39:32
- Label: Select
- Producer: John G. Brennan

The Jerky Boys chronology
The Jerky Boys (1993)	The Jerky Boys 2 (1994)

Professional ratings
Review scores
Source	Rating
AllMusic	4.5/5 stars
Select	4/5 medals

The Jerky Boys is the self-titled debut album of prank calls recordings by American comedy act the Jerky Boys. It was released on March 1, 1993 via Select Records.

The album was received well by critics and the public alike, eventually reaching platinum sales certification by the Recording Industry Association of America.

== Track listing ==
No.	Title	Length
1.	"Irate Tile Man"	0:52
2.	"Unemployed Painter"	1:57
3.	"Laser Surgery"	0:37
4.	"Insulator Job"	1:50
5.	"Egyptian Magician"	2:12
6.	"Sol's Glasses"	2:49
7.	"Car Salesman"	2:11
8.	"Sushi Chef"	0:55
9.	"Super Across the Way"	0:57
10.	"The Gay Model"	3:14
11.	"The Home Wrecker"	2:31
12.	"Auto Mechanic"	2:01
13.	"Dental Malpractice"	3:14
14.	"Starter Motor Repair"	1:32
15.	"Hurt at Work"	1:29
16.	"Hot Rod Mover"	2:03
17.	"Firecracker Mishap"	1:41
18.	"Punitive Damages"	2:04
19.	"Piano Tuner"	1:37
20.	"Gay Hard Hat"	1:29
21.	"Uncle Freddie"	2:52
Total length:		39:32

== Charts ==
Chart (1995)	Peak position
US Billboard 200	75

== Certifications ==
Region	Certification	Certified units/sales
United States (RIAA)	Platinum	1,000,000^{^}
^{^} Shipments figures based on certification alone.
