= Sol's Rusty Trombone =

Studio album by the Jerky Boys
- Released: March 20, 2007
- Genre: Comedy, prank calls
- Length: 36:20
- Label: Laugh.com
- Producer: John G. Brennan

The Jerky Boys chronology
The Jerky Tapes (2001)	Sol's Rusty Trombone (2007)

Sol's Rusty Trombone is the seventh comedy album by prank call artist, the Jerky Boys. The album was released in 2007, and is the second Jerky Boys album to be released by the independent Laugh.com record label.

The album differs from previous Jerky Boys releases as it consists mainly of voicemail messages and ringtones, with six prank calls mixed in.

Sol's Rusty Trombone is also the first Jerky Boys album released without former Jerky Boys member Kamal Ahmed, who left the act in 2000.

== Track listing ==
1. "Introduction" (Brennan) – 1:12
2. "Rusty Trombone" (Brennan) – 0:25
3. "Deliveries" (Brennan) – 0:17
4. "Don't Bother" (Brennan) – 0:19
5. "Ricotta Cheese" (Brennan) – 0:17
6. "Boiled Potato"" (Brennan) – 0:13
7. "Vicious Remark" (Brennan) – 0:16
8. "You're Ridiculous" (Brennan) – 0:17
9. "Blasting Tanks" (Brennan) – 0:16
10. "Marble Mouth" (Brennan) – 0:15
11. "Mike and Sheep" (Brennan) – 0:19
12. "Blown Up Wagon" (Brennan) – 0:11
13. "Meat Player" (Brennan) – 0:11
14. "Jerky Call, No. 1: Ballot Box" (Brennan) – 2:04
15. "Beaten Balls" (Brennan) – 0:15
16. "Chalupa Wrap" (Brennan) – 0:15
17. "Cute with Your Mouth" (Brennan) – 0:14
18. "Pigeon Face" (Brennan) – 0:13
19. "Rap in Head" (Brennan) – 0:07
20. "Squeaky Balls" (Brennan) – 0:12
21. "Willy the Jackass" (Brennan) – 0:16
22. "The Hot Mops" (Brennan) – 0:16
23. "Ass Slap" (Brennan) – 0:17
24. "Licks Balloons" (Brennan) – 0:15
25. "Likes Lobster" (Brennan) – 0:16
26. "The Player Hater" (Brennan) – 0:16
27. "Crazy Eyes" (Brennan) – 0:16
28. "Meat Whistle (yum yum says jeffrey)" (Brennan) – 0:19
29. "No Respect" (Brennan) – 0:20
30. "Tap Skills" (Brennan) – 0:33
31. "Whipping" (Brennan) – 0:29
32. "Takes a Tumble" (Brennan) – 0:19
33. "Jerky Call, No. 2: Holiday Grill Dancer" (Brennan) – 2:33
34. "Ringtones Intro" (Brennan) – 0:16
35. "Ass Massage" (Brennan) – 0:16
36. "Pigeon Died" (Brennan) – 0:07
37. "Regular Jackass" (Brennan) – 0:08
38. "Bull Ride" (Brennan) – 0:16
39. "Rap in Head" (Brennan) – 0:07
40. "Auto Mechanic" (Brennan) – 0:16
41. "Barrel Ass" (Brennan) – 0:06
42. "Jerky Pick Me Up" (Brennan) – 0:07
43. "Butterballs" (Brennan) – 0:08
44. "Frank's Romp" (Brennan) – 0:16
45. "Happy Nuts" (Brennan) – 0:15
46. "Jerky Call, No. 3: Small Eel, Small Shock" (Brennan) – 3:08
47. "Heard It All" (Brennan) – 0:16
48. "Hey Nutty" (Brennan) – 0:16
49. "Numbnuts" (Brennan) – 0:06
50. "Pigeon Face" (Brennan) – 0:19
51. "Speed Racer" (Brennan) – 0:13
52. "Boiled Potato" (Brennan) – 0:11
53. "Bubbles Escaped" (Brennan) – 0:17
54. "Crazy Little Monkey" (Brennan) – 0:16
55. "Did That Years Ago" (Brennan) – 0:09
56. "Hello Bing-Bong" (Brennan) – 0:18
57. "Jack Beats Monkey" (Brennan) – 0:12
58. "Little Freak" (Brennan) – 0:07
59. "Jerky Call, No. 4: Occasional Banners" (Brennan) – 1:49
60. "Oil Party" (Brennan) – 0:17
61. "Pulling Furniture" (Brennan) – 0:08
62. "Smells Like Bacon" (Brennan) – 0:08
63. "Tennis Ball Machine" (Brennan) – 0:17
64. "Wrapped in Plastic" (Brennan) – 0:08
65. "Hit off the Head" (Brennan) – 0:08
66. "Mike's Parrot" (Brennan) – 0:17
67. "Rub Salve" (Brennan) – 0:07
68. "Bad Tomatoes" (Brennan) – 0:15
69. "Big Shove, No. 1" (Brennan) – 0:10
70. "Big Shove, No. 2" (Brennan) – 0:14
71. "Celebration" (Brennan) – 0:11
72. "Jerky Call, No. 5: Got Worms" (Brennan) – 1:16
73. "Bomb Mishap" (Brennan) – 0:16
74. "Cut the Wire" (Brennan) – 0:23
75. "Hairpiece" (Brennan) – 0:07
76. "Mariposa" (Brennan) – 0:11
77. "Rocine - "G" Boy" (Brennan) – 0:11
78. "Likes Lobster" (Brennan) – 0:12
79. "Likes Pizza" (Brennan) – 0:10
80. "The Player" (Brennan) – 0:09
81. "Ass Slap" (Brennan) – 0:17
82. "Lobster Slap" (Brennan) – 0:16
83. "2 Wheeler Crash" (Brennan) – 0:17
84. "Can't See" (Brennan) – 0:08
85. "Jerky Call, No. 6: Quick Jerks" (Brennan) – 2:12
86. "Feet Hurt" (Brennan) – 0:08
87. "I Just Pissed" (Brennan) – 0:08
88. "I Just Tumbled" (Brennan) – 0:10
89. "Police Billy Club" (Brennan) – 0:16
90. "Seafaring Sol" (Brennan) – 0:18
91. "Smashed Feet" (Brennan) – 0:17
92. "Sol's Gas" (Brennan) – 0:16
93. "Beaten Up" (Brennan) – 0:12
94. "Broke My Legs" (Brennan) – 0:09
95. "Donkey Kick" (Brennan) – 0:17
96. "Hemhorroids" (Brennan) – 0:15
97. "Sol Bomb" (Brennan) – 0:08
98. "They're Trying" (Brennan) – 1:06
