= List of stage names: T =

This list of stage names lists names used by those in the entertainment industry, alphabetically by their stage name's surname (or the best approximation) followed by the given name (or the best approximation) where the surname begins with "T". One-word stage names are presented in List of one-word stage names.

Stage name	Birth name	Life	Notability	Notes
Mr. T	Laurence Tureaud	1952–	American actor	
Sonny T.	Sonny Thompson	Unknown	American musician	
Unknown T	Daniel Lena	1999–	British-Ugandan rapper	
Vic Tablian	Varoujan Aintablian	1937–	Armenian-British actor	
Jamaaladeen Tacuma	Rudy McDaniel	1956–	American musician	
Tanya Tagaq	Tanya Gillis	1975–	Canadian Inuk throat singer	
Seo Taiji	Jeong Hyeon-cheol	1972–	South Korean musician	
Lyle Talbot	Lisle Henderson	1902–1996	American actor	
Nita Talbot	Anita Sokol	1930–	American actress	
Myfanwy Talog	Myfanwy Talog Williams	1944–1995	Welsh actress	
Sharon Tandy	Sharon Finkelstein	1943–2015	South African singer	
Dr. Tangalanga	Julio Victorio De Rissio	1916–2013	Argentine comedian	
Bill Tarmey	William Piddington	1941–2012	English actor and singer	
Frank Tashlin	Francis von Taschlein	1913–1972	American animator and filmmaker	Also known as Frank Tash and Tish Tash
Catherine Tate	Catherine Ford	1969–	English actress and comedienne	
Richard Tauber	Richard Denemy	1891–1948	American opera singer and actor	
Alex Taylor	Adriana Molinari	1947–1993	American singer	
Chip Taylor	James Voight	1940–	American songwriter and singer	
Eva Taylor	Irene Gibbons	1895–1977	American singer and actress	
Georgia Taylor	Claire Jackson	1980–	English actress	
Joan Taylor	Rose Marie Emma	1929–2012	American actress	
Kent Taylor	Louis William Weiss	1907–1987	American actor	
Koko Taylor	Cora Ann Walton	1928–2009	American singer	
Renée Taylor	Renée Wexler	1933–	American, screenwriter, playwright, producer and director	
Rip Taylor	Charles Elmer Taylor Jr.	1931–2019	American actor and comedian	
Robert Taylor	Spangler Arlington Brugh	1911–1969	American actor	
Shirin Taylor	Shirin C. Ghadiali	1951–	English actress	
Vince Taylor	Brian Holden	1939–1991	English singer	
William Desmond Taylor	William Deane-Tanner	1872–1922	Anglo-Irish-American film director and actor	
Scout Taylor-Compton	Desiaree Starr Compton	1989–	American actress	
Lyle Tayo	Lyle Shipman	1899–1971	American actress	
Cocoa Tea	Colvin George Scott	1959–2025	Jamaican reggae singer	
Leonard Teale	Leonard Thiele	1922–1994	Australian actor	
Lil Tecca	Tyler-Justin Sharpe	2002–	American rapper	
MC Tee	Touré Embden	1964–	Jamaican-American rapper (Mantronix)	
Super Tekla	Romeo Librada	1982–	Filipino actor, comedian and television host	
Lou Tellegen	Isidore Louis Bernard Edmon von Dommelen	1881/1883–1934	Dutch-American actor, director and screenwriter	
Joey Tempest	Rolf Larsson	1963–	Swedish singer (Europe)	
Marie Tempest	Mary Etherington	1864–1942	English singer and actress	
Nino Tempo	Antonino LoTempio	1935–2025	American musician, singer and actor (Nino Tempo & April Stevens)	
Vienna Teng	Cynthia Yih Shih	1978–	American musician	
David Tennant	David McDonald	1971–	Scottish actor	
Edward Tenpole	Edward Felix Tudor-Pole	1954–	English musician, television presenter and actor	
Robert Tepper	Antoine Robert Teppardo	1950–	American songwriter and singer (Iron Butterfly)	
Tila Tequila	Thien Nguyen	1981–	American television and internet personality	
Bryn Terfel	Bryn Terfel Jones	1965–	Welsh singer	
Todd Terje	Terje Olsen	1981–	Norwegian DJ, songwriter and record producer	
Tammi Terrell	Thomasina Montgomery	1945–1970	American singer-songwriter	
Krissada Terrence	Krissada Clapp	1970–	Thai pop singer and actor (Pru)	
Jack Terricloth	Peter Ventantonio	1970–2021	American musician and singer (The World/Inferno Friendship Society)	
Norma Terris	Norma Allison Cook	1904–1989	American actress	
Ellaline Terriss	Mary Ellaline Lewin	1871–1971	British actress	
Tom Terriss	Thomas Lewin	1872–1964	English actor, screenwriter and film director	
William Terriss	William Lewin	1847–1897	English actor	
Alice Terry	Alice Taaffe	1899–1987	American actress	
Phillip Terry	Frederick Kormann	1909–1993	American actor	
Sonny Terry	Saunders Terrell	1911–1986	American musician	
Walter Tetley	Walter Tetzlaff	1915–1975	American actor	
Joe Tex	Joseph Arrington Jr.	1935–1982	American singer and musician	
Bilat Pyan Than	Than E	1908–2007	Burmese singer	
Sister Rosetta Tharpe	Rosetta Nubin	1915–1973	American singer, songwriter and guitarist	
Lorna Thayer	Lorna Casey	1919–2005	American character actress	
Max Thayer	Michael Thayer	1946–	American actor	
Allan Théo	Alain Rouget	1972–	French singer	
Brother Theodore	Theodore Gottlieb	1906–2001	German-American actor and comedian	
E Thi	Swe Swe Win	1970–2017	Burmese soothsayer and fortune-teller	
Danny Thomas	Amos Yakhoob	1912–1991	American actor and comedian	
Eddie Kaye Thomas	Edward Kovelsky	1980–	American actor	
Ian Thomas	Ian Thomas Hoelen	1997–	Belgian singer-songwriter, musician, actor and model	
Jameson Thomas	Thomas Jameson	1888–1939	English actor	
Jay Thomas	John Thomas Terrell	1948–2017	American actor	
Jonathan Taylor Thomas	Jonathan Taylor Weiss	1981–	American actor and director	
Paul Thomas	Philip Toubus	1949–2025	American pornographic actor and director	
Robin Thomas	Robin Thomas Grossman	1949–	American actor	
Sunset Thomas	Diane Fowler	1972–	American former pornographic actress	
Duane Thompson	Duane Maloney	1903–1970	American actress	
Kay Thompson	Catherine Fink	1909–1998	American author, composer, musician, actress and singer	
Sue Thompson	Eva Sue McKee	1925–2021	American singer	
Frank Thornton	Frank Thornton Ball	1921–2013	English actor	
Juan Carlos Thorry	José Torrontegui	1908–2000	Argentine actor	
Black Thought	Tariq Trotter	1973–	American rapper and actor (The Roots)	
Bambie Thug	Bambie Ray Robinson	1993–	Irish singer-songwriter	
Young Thug	Jeffrey Williams	1991–	American rapper	
Chief Thundercloud	Victor Daniels	1899–1955	American character actor	
Johnny Thunders	John Genzale Jr.	1952–1991	American musician and singer (New York Dolls)	
Greta Thyssen	Grethe Thygesen	1927–2018	Danish actress	
Tina Ti	Kwok-Hing Leung	1945–2010	Hong Kong actress	Also known as Di Na
Pamela Tiffin	Pamela Tiffin Wonso	1942–2020	American actress	
Kevin Tighe	John Kevin Fishburn	1944–	American actor	
Vesta Tilley	Matilda Powles	1864–1952	English music hall performer	
Tiny Tim	Herbert Khaury	1932–1996	American singer and musician	
Betty Ting	Mei-Li Tang	1947–	Taiwanese former actress	
Thelma Tixou	Thelma Siklenik	1944–2019	Mexican actress	
Hallie Todd	Hallie Eckstein	1962–	American actress	
Mike Todd	Avrom Goldbogen	1909–1958	American producer	
Nick Todd	Cecil Boone	1935–2023	American pop singer	
Eva Todor	Éva Fodor	1919–2017	Brazilian actress and dancer	
George Tokoro	Takayuki Haga	1955–	Japanese comedian, television personality and singer-songwriter	
Michael Tolan	Seymour Tuchow	1925–2011	American actor	
Will Toledo	William Barnes	1992–	American singer-songwriter (Car Seat Headrest)	
Lorna Tolentino	Victoria Lorna Aluquin-Fernandez	1961–	Filipina actress, television host and producer	
Big Tom	Tom McBride	1936–2018	Irish musician (Big Tom and The Mainliners)	
Japanese Tommy	Thomas Dilward	c.1817–1887	American entertainer	
Little Tony	Antonio Ciacci	1941–2013	Italian singer	
Steve Peregrin Took	Stephen Porter	1949–1980	English musician	
Crazy Toones	Lamar Calhoun	1971–2017	American record producer (WC and the Maad Circle)	
Carrot Top	Scott Thompson	1965–	American comedian and actor	
Peta Toppano	Peita Margaret Toppano	1951–	English-born Australian former actress	
Rita Tori	Marguerite Thoresen	1908–1967	Norwegian ballet dancer and choreographer	
Peter Tork	Peter Thorkelson	1942–2019	American musician and actor (The Monkees)	
David Torrence	David Tayson	1864–1951	Scottish actor	
Alessandra Torresani	Alessandra Toreson	1987–	American actress	
Peter Tosh	Winston McIntosh	1944–1987	Jamaican musician	
Tamara Toumanova	Tamara Khassidovitch	1919–1996	Russian-American ballerina and actress	
Maurice Tourneur	Maurice Thomas	1876–1961	French film director and screenwriter	
Mageina Tovah	Mageina Tovah Begtrup	1979–	American actress	
Leo Towers	Leopoldo Torres Nilsson	1924–1978	Argentine film director, producer and screenwriter	
Myke Towers	Michael Anthony Torres Monge	1994–	Puerto Rican rapper and singer	
AJ Tracey	Ché Grant	1994–	British rapper	
Sheila Tracy	Sheila Lugg	1934–2014	English broadcaster, writer, musician and singer	
Steve Tracy	Steven Crumrine	1952–1986	American actor	
Chris Tranchell	Christopher Small	1941–	English actor	
Henry Travers	Travers Heagerty	1874–1965	English character actor	
Dave Lee Travis	David Griffin	1945–	English disc jockey, radio personality and television presenter	
Randy Travis	Randy Traywick	1959–	American country singer, songwriter, musician and actor	
Robert Trebor	Robert Schenkman	1953–2025	American character actor	
Chief John Big Tree	Isaac John	1877–1967	American actor	
Dorothy Tree	Dorothy Triebitz	1906–1992	American actress	
Herbert Beerbohm Tree	Herbert Beerbohm	1852–1917	English actor	
Oliver Tree	Oliver Tree Nickell	1993–2026	American singer-songwriter and rapper	
Jackie Trent	Yvonne Burgess	1940–2015	English singer-songwriter and actress	
Georges Tréville	Georges Troly	1875–1944	French actor and film director	
Roger Tréville	Roger Troly	1902–2005	French actor	
Claire Trevor	Claire Wemlinger	1910–2000	American actress	
Trick Trick	Christian Anthony Mathis	1973–	American rapper and record producer	
Cowboy Troy	Troy Coleman	1970–	American rapper and singer	
Doris Troy	Doris Higginson	1937–2004	American actress and singer	
Andrea True	Andrea Truden	1943–2011	American singer	
Timmy Trumpet	Timothy Smith	1982–	Australian musician and DJ	
Arnaud Tsamere	Arnaud Tsedri	1975–	French comedian and actor	
Nicholas Tse	Ting-Fung Tse	1980–	Hong Kong actor, martial artist, singer and songwriter	
King Tubby	Osborne Ruddock	1941–1989	Jamaican sound engineer	
Richard Tucker	Rubin Ticker	1913–1975	American opera singer	
Tommy Tucker	Robert Higginbotham	1933–1982	American blues singer-songwriter and musician	
Antony Tudor	William Cook	1908–1987	English ballet choreographer and dancer	
Charlie Tuna	Arthur Ferguson	1944–2016	American radio personality and television host	
Janine Turner	Janine Gauntt	1962–	American actress	
Sammy Turner	Samuel Black	1932–2026	American singer	
Yolande Turner	Yolande Turnbull	1935–2003	British actress and screenwriter	
Cosey Fanni Tutti	Christine Newby	1951–	English performance artist, musician and writer (Throbbing Gristle and Chris & Cosey)	
Shania Twain	Eileen Edwards	1965–	Canadian singer-songwriter and actress	
FKA Twigs	Tahliah Barnett	1988–	English singer, songwriter and dancer	
Aphex Twin	Richard James	1971–	British musician, composer and DJ	
Conway Twitty	Harold Jenkins	1933–1993	American singer and songwriter	
Bonnie Tyler	Gaynor Hopkins	1951–2026	Welsh singer	
Ginny Tyler	Merrie Virginia Erlandson	1925–2012	American voice actress	
Judy Tyler	Judith Hess	1932–1957	American singer and actress	
Steven Tyler	Stephen Tallarico	1948–	American singer (Aerosmith)	
T. Texas Tyler	David Myrick	1916–1972	American singer and songwriter	
Tom Tyler	Vincent Markowski	1903–1954	American actor	
Hunter Tylo	Deborah Jo Hunter	1962–	American actress, author and former model	
George Tyne	Martin Yarus	1917–2008	American actor	Also known as Buddy Yarus
Rob Tyner	Robert Derminer	1944–1991	American musician (MC5)	
"Blue" Gene Tyranny	Joseph Gantic	1945–2020	American avant-garde composer and pianist	
