= Stop Staring at Me! =

Studio album by The Jerky Boys
- Released: May 18, 1999
- Recorded: 1998–1999
- Genre: Comedy, prank calls
- Length: 55:09
- Label: Mercury
- Producer: The Jerky Boys

The Jerky Boys chronology
Jerky Boys 4 (1997)	Stop Staring at Me! (1999)	The Jerky Tapes (2001)

Professional ratings
Review scores
Source	Rating
Allmusic	2.5/5 stars
Q	3/5 stars

Stop Staring at Me! is the fifth comedy album released by prank call artists, the Jerky Boys. It was released on May 18, 1999, and was the final Jerky Boys album released by Mercury Records.

== Track listing ==
1. "Special Delivery" - 1:11
2. "Willie The Jackass" - 2:16
3. "1000 Chickens Trilogy (Part 1)" - 0:39
4. "Nuts To You" - 1:46
5. "Tarbash's Cab Trouble" - 3:13
6. "Masturbation Box" - 5:13
7. "Rosine Likes Balloons" - 1:08
8. "1000 Chickens Trilogy (Part 2)" - 2:02
9. "Hucklebuck" - 4:17
10. "Duck Cleaning" - 2:21
11. "Super Gay" - 1:36
12. "I Pickle They" - 3:36
13. "Pork Fried Rice" - 0:56
14. "Hair Vitamins" - 1:16
15. "Burial Vaults" - 2:36
16. "Marriage Insurance" - 2:18
17. "Nam Hu?" - 2:28
18. "Send A Salami To Your Boy In The Army" - 2:32
19. "Pick Up Pie" - 1:17
20. "Big Hock" - 3:40
21. "Synchronized Swimming" - 1:45
22. "Frank's Pickles" - 1:45
23. "You Wanna Scrap?" - 3:00
24. "1000 Chickens Trilogy (Part 3)" - 2:10

Total length 55:01

== The "Interactive/Enhanced Portion" ==
Not much is known about the "Interactive/Enhanced Portion" of this CD-ROM. What is known is that it brings the characters from The Jerky Boys to life in a computer's CD-ROM drive. The Interactivity allows a user to "actually 'blow Sol's hand off,' 'get Frank Rizzo loaded' and 'shoot boiled potatoes up Jack Tor s' ### (rectum). " The files in the CD also include classic sound-bytes which can be accessed in a computer without the need for CD ripping, as well as various videogames as well as a screen saver. These interactive features are meant for a computer that runs Windows 3.1, Windows 95, or on an archaic Apple Macintosh. These features do not impede upon normal use of the CD to enjoy the prank calls as used in any CD player.
