= The Jerky Boys 3 =

Jerky Boys 3

Studio album by Jerky Boys
- Released: August 20, 1996
- Recorded: 1995–1996
- Genre: Comedy, prank calls
- Length: 64:28
- Label: Mercury
- Producer: The Jerky Boys

Jerky Boys chronology
The Jerky Boys 2 (1994)	Jerky Boys 3 (1996)	The Jerky Boys 4 (1997)

Professional ratings
Review scores
Source	Rating
Allmusic	link

Jerky Boys 3 is the third comedy album by prank call artists, the Jerky Boys. The album was released on August 20, 1996, and was the first Jerky Boys album released on the Mercury Records label.

== Track listing ==
1. "Santa's Delivery – Frank Rizzo" (1:09)
2. "Lawn Equipment Debate – Sol Rosenberg" (2:18)
3. "Balloon Rides – Frank Rizzo" (2:07)
4. "The Dresser – Kissel" (1:11)
5. "Silly Food – Frank Rizzo" (1:12)
6. "Sol's Chainsaw Shock – Sol Rosenberg" (1:13)
7. "Stop That – Tarbash" (2:35)
8. "Chainsaw Shock, Pt. 2 – Sol Rosenberg" (2:22)
9. "Tandem Bicycles – Jack Tor s" (1:39)
10. "Safety Gates – Frank Rizzo" (3:30)
11. "Bamm! – Curly G." (1:29)
12. "Facelift Without Surgery – Jack Tor s" (1:35)
13. "Lawnmower Sale – Big Ole' Bad Ass Bob the Cattle Rustler" (2:46)
14. "Tarbash's New Shoes – Tarbash" (1:39)
15. "Signin' – Rosine" (2:38)
16. "No! – Mike Derucki" (:25)
17. "Sol's Civil War Memorabilia – Sol Rosenberg" (3:46)
18. "Civil War Memorabilia, Pt. 2 – Sol Rosenberg" (2:07)
19. "Bad Tomatoes – Nikos" (1:23)
20. "Florida, The Tropical State – Jack Tor s" (3:32)
21. "TV Repair – Kissel/Pico" (2:35)
22. "1-800-How's My Driving? – Frank Rizzo" (2:38)
23. "Bad Ass Massage – Big Ole' Bad Ass Bob the Cattle Rustler" (2:36)
24. "Paradise – Jack Tor s" (1:27)
25. "Body Building – Frank Rizzo" (3:31)
26. "Kissel Crooner – Kissel" (1:46)
27. "Angry Camper's Dad – Frank Rizzo" (1:49)
28. "Bird Feed – Sol Rosenberg" (3:33)
29. "New Awnings – Mike Derucki" (3:57)
30. Dog Training (Answer Phone) : hidden track, not listed
