= The Stoned Age =

- Movie poster
- Directed by: James Melkonian
- Written by: James Melkonian; Rich Wilkes
- Produced by: David Heyman; Neal H. Moritz
- Starring: Michael Kopelow; Bradford Tatum; Clifton Gonzalez-Gonzalez; China Kantner; Daniel Collins; Renee Allman; Kevin Kilner; David Groh
- Cinematography: Paul Holahan
- Edited by: Peter Schink
- Music by: David Kitay
- Production companies: Trimark Pictures; Moritz-Heyman Productions
- Distributed by: Trimark Pictures
- Release date: February 11, 1994
- Running time: 90 minutes
- Country: United States
- Language: English

The Stoned Age is a 1994 American stoner comedy film directed by James Melkonian, following two long-haired stoners who spend a night touring the suburbs of Los Angeles, looking for alcohol, parties, and girls.

== Plot ==
The film is set in Torrance, California on a Saturday night in 1980.

An aggressive ex-convict known as "Crump's Brother" is picked up by a local teen while hitchhiking on the freeway and informs him about two girls he intends to party with in Torrance Beach, across from the Frankie Avalon house. The teen then tells his friends about the girls, one of whom, Tack, is motivated to go and find them.

Long-haired stoners Michael Hubbs and Joe Connolly drive around town looking for young women. They meet Tack, who tells them about the women and agrees to lead them to the location in exchange for a ride. They stop at the gas station and talk to their friend Crump, the gas station attendant, who tells them that the women are his brother's girlfriends. Joe and Hubbs lie to Crump that there is another party going so they can distract him and his brother from the girls, in order to reach their location first. They leave Tack at the gas station and continue to Torrance Beach.

They arrive at the house and meet an extremely attractive young girl, Lanie, who sends them to a liquor store for alcohol. When they return, they meet the homeowner's daughter Jill, a jaded hippie who is Lanie's friend. Meanwhile, Tack convinces his nerdy friend Norm to take him to the beach. They arrive at the house and after a brief altercation, Tack convinces the group to go to a party in Palos Verdes, to Joe and Hubbs' irritation.

At the house party, Muldoon, the host, lets the girls in but shuts everyone else out. Lanie leaves following an altercation with Muldoon and asks Joe to take her swimming in a neighbor's pool. The police shut down the party, and Hubbs and Jill locate Joe and Lanie next door. Lanie is impressed with Hubbs' aggressive behavior, and the two walk upstairs to have sex, angering Joe.

Having had their beer confiscated by police, Tack and some others rob a liquor warehouse for beer, and head to the house. Joe and Jill partially reconcile but return to find Tack and the Guzzlers converging on the home. A fight breaks out between Joe and Tack and Jill runs inside, eventually letting Joe back in and locking the door.

After getting stoned, Hubbs tells Joe he has arranged for Lanie to perform fellatio on him as a "birthday present". Joe finds Lanie asleep, covers her up, and walks out to find Hubbs and Jill making out on the couch; Joe is upset but learns that Jill was the instigator. They are interrupted when Crump's Brother arrives outside and begins to break down the door. They flee to the kitchen but shortly afterwards, they hear the commotion subsiding; Jill's father, Warren, has returned from a college reunion and beaten the entire crowd of kids—including Crump's Brother—unconscious. Hubbs manages to escape by jumping through a window on the upper floor, but Warren catches Joe and holds him captive awaiting the arrival of the police. Warren is very overbearing and emotionally abusive towards Jill, and eventually, Joe stands up for her and begins fighting with Warren. Joe and Hubbs escape just ahead of the police. Enamored with Joe, Jill gives him her full name and geographical location so he can find her later.

The police arrest the entire group of drunken teenagers, and Joe and Hubbs escape in their car. Hubbs mocks Joe for his apparent cowardice in attempting to seduce Lanie and Jill, and talks negatively about Jill. Joe loses his temper and attacks Hubbs while driving, forcing him to acknowledge that Jill is "cool". Joe then plays the Blue Öyster Cult song "(Don't Fear) the Reaper" as the credits roll.

Following the credits, Joe and Hubbs are offered Blue Öyster Cult concert T-shirts outside a convenience store by two men, but Joe refuses because the shirts are bootlegs. The scalpers are played by actual Blue Öyster Cult band members Eric Bloom and Buck Dharma.

== Production ==
The film is based on a short film, "Tack's Chicks", directed by James Melkonian at AFI in 1991, co-written by Melkonian and Rich Wilkes. Michael Kopelow also starred as Joe in the short. The feature script was written by Melkonian and Wilkes in 1991 and was shot in February 1993.

The producers initially titled the film Tack's Chicks and then Teenage Wasteland, before settling on The Stoned Age.

The Stoned Age was produced by David Heyman, who went on to produce the Harry Potter film series.

The film was originally conceived with Led Zeppelin being Joe's favorite band, including "Trampled Underfoot" as the main title song, "In the Light" as the song that would accompany Joe's concert flashback, "Heartbreaker" and "The Lemon Song" as the songs that would introduce Lanie, and "Tangerine" as the "pussy" song. However, the rights to Led Zeppelin music were not available, and several other bands were considered, including Yes, Jethro Tull, The Who, The Grateful Dead, and Pink Floyd, before Blue Öyster Cult was decided on.

Melkonian acknowledges that there are a number of anachronisms and continuity problems, which are probably due to the low budget. In the kitchen scene, the faces of some crew members can be seen reflected in the front of the microwave oven. Also, there are various instances of things during the movie that didn't exist in the 1970s or 1980 being clearly visible (or heard, since Blue Oyster Cult's song "Burnin' for You" wasn't released until 1981). There is also a point in the movie where a sign for the crafts store Michaels, which didn't exist until 1984, is clearly visible.

== Cast ==
- Michael Kopelow as Joe Connolly
- Bradford Tatum as Michael Hubbs
- China Kantner as Jill Wajakawakawitz
- Renee Ammann as Lanie
- Clifton Gonzalez-Gonzalez as Tack
- Kevin Kilner as Officer Dean
- David Groh as Dad
- Michael Wiseman as Crump's Brother
- Taylor Negron as Clerk
- Jake Busey as Jimmy Muldoon
- Richard Chaim as Norm Hankey
- Art Chudabala as Mike Dick
- Josh Berman as Perk
- David R. Parker as Mike New York
- Daniel Collins as Crump
- Frankie Avalon as himself
- Stevie Rachelle as Rocker/Tack's friend (uncredited)

== Soundtrack ==
- Blue Öyster Cult – "(Don't Fear) The Reaper"
- Montrose – "Rock Candy"
- Black Sabbath – "Paranoid"
- Foghat – "Slow Ride"
- Blue Öyster Cult – "Burnin' for You"
- Ivory Tower – "Flying Blind"
- Focus – "Hocus Pocus"
- Ted Nugent – "Cat Scratch Fever"
- Foghat – "Drivin' Wheel"
- Larry Owens – "Travel in Style"
- T. Rex – "Get It On"
- Deep Purple – "Highway Star"
- James Kalamasz & Alain Leroux – "Country Fever"
- Wild Cherry – "Play That Funky Music"
- KC and the Sunshine Band – "I Like to Do It"
- The Trammps – "Disco Inferno"
- B. T. Express – "Do It ('Til You're Satisfied)"
- Simon Holland – "Disco Dance Fever"
- Ole Georg – "Visit Bavaria"
- G. Benhamou – "Splendid"
- The Hungarian State Orchestra – "Also Sprach Zarathustra"

== See also ==
- Dazed and Confused (1993)
