= The Jerky Boys =

American comedy act

- Born: Kamal and Johnny; Queens, New York City, New York, United States
- Occupation: Comedians
- Years active: 1989–2001; 2006–present
- Known for: Prank calls, comedic skits

The Jerky Boys are an American comedy act from Queens, New York City, New York, whose routine consisted of prank telephone calls and related skits. The duo was founded in 1989 by childhood friends Johnny Brennan and Kamal Ahmed. After Ahmed left the act in 2000, the Jerky Boys continued as a solo act featuring only Brennan, before going on a 19-year hiatus after the 2001 release of the franchise's penultimate album, The Jerky Tapes. Brennan released a follow-up album of new material in November 2020.

The phone calls were made by calling unsuspecting recipients or in response to classified advertisements placed in local New York–based newspapers. Each call was made in character, usually with over-the-top voices influenced by the duo's family members. Many compilations of the group's work have been released onto albums. According to the act's current record label, Laugh.com, the Jerky Boys have sold over 8,000,000 albums since their 1993 debut.

== History ==
=== Duo ===
Brennan began making and recording prank telephone calls in the 1970s, and teamed up with Ahmed, in the late 1980s/early 1990s in their Queens neighborhood. The duo made a number of bootleg tapes of their recorded phone calls that eventually were obtained by New York–based radio personality Howard Stern, who played the duo's tracks on the air.

The English rock band Radiohead named their debut album, Pablo Honey (1993), after a Jerky Boys sketch in which the caller poses as the victim's mother and says: "Pablo, honey? Please come to Florida." A sample of the sketch appears in the song "How Do You". The Radiohead singer, Thom Yorke, said: "The notion of phoning up people cold is so nineties. It's just the ultimate sacrilege – turn up in someone's life and they can't do anything about it."

The Jerky Boys gained notoriety from their exposure on The Howard Stern Show, and released their first album, The Jerky Boys, in 1993. The album topped the Billboard Heatseekers chart and was eventually certified platinum by the Recording Industry Association of America. The duo released the platinum selling and Grammy nominated The Jerky Boys 2 in 1994, followed by The Jerky Boys 3 in 1996, The Jerky Boys 4 in 1997, Stop Staring at Me! in 1999, and The Jerky Tapes in 2001.

In 1995, the duo starred in Touchstone Pictures' The Jerky Boys: The Movie. The movie was filmed in 1993–94, and it was almost universally panned by critics. Kamal became an independent filmmaker in 1997.

=== Solo act ===
In 2000, tension developed between the two. The duo appeared in the Psychopathic Records film Big Money Hustlas, but because Brennan and Ahmed could not get along, they shared no scenes in the film; Brennan played a supporting role as the police chief, and Ahmed appeared in a cameo as Frank Kissel, an audience member at the strip club. By the end of the year, Ahmed passed a note to the manager, who passed it to Brennan: Ahmed decided to quit the group.

Ahmed released a solo album, Once a Jerk, Always a Jerk, in 2000.

On March 20, 2007, Brennan, who is now the only constant member of the group, kept the Jerky Boys name and released a solo album, Sol's Rusty Trombone, a collection of mostly ring tones and skits. On March 5, 2010, Brennan, in conjunction with Inner Four, released two apps for the iPhone and iPod Touch platform: The Jerky Boys Prank Caller, and The Jerky Boys Pinball. In late 2011, Brennan started a weekly podcast titled The Jerky Boys Show with Johnny Brennan in which he discussed the history of the calls, how the characters came about, and other hijinks. The podcast also gave fans an opportunity to speak to Brennan directly. The podcast ran for 17 episodes and abruptly ended in November 2012. Brennan announced a subscription for new calls being regularly released each month but this never occurred.

He recorded new prank calls for a Rolling Stone retrospective in 2014.

== Regular characters ==
- Frank Rizzo – an extremely abrasive, foul-mouthed blue-collar Italian-American New Yorker with bizarre complaints and requests (voiced by Johnny Brennan). Frank curses repeatedly at a potential employer during an inquiry about a job, and accuses the Mickey Mouse character at Disney World of being sexually inappropriate with his children.
- Sol Rosenberg – a frail, insecure, New York Jew who suffers from various, and often comical problems and ailments. Somewhat childish in his demeanor, Sol seeks treatment for problems ranging from genital warts to a fear of his own shadow (voiced by Johnny Brennan).
- Tarbash, the Egyptian Magician – a Middle Eastern man with a repertoire of dangerous stage tricks who mutilates himself or is attacked by various wild animals used in his act. His last appearance in the Jerky Boys albums was in The Jerky Tapes (voiced by Kamal).
- Ali Kamal – a Middle Eastern cab driver victimized by a sadistic dentist. Assaulted and possibly molested, Ali seeks the aid of a lawyer specializing in "dental malpractice." On another occasion, Kamal seeks the assistance of an attorney after being brutally beaten by a tenant for delivering pizza to an incorrect address (voiced by Kamal).
- Jack Tor s – a flamboyantly homosexual man who frequently takes part in bizarre sexual activities and is looking for assistance or supplies related to this. Also a musician, catwalk model, casting director and a dancer (voiced by Johnny Brennan). In a running gag, when asked to spell his surname, the character would reply: "T-o-r... ... ... s".
- Frank Kissel – an aged World War II veteran and ex-singer who uses a wheelchair. The character normally refers to himself only as Kissel. He sometimes complains about or is heard arguing with his wife. Kamal, who voices the character, appeared in full old-man makeup as Kissel in the Insane Clown Posse movie Big Money Hustlas.
- Jocko Johnson – voice and behavior similar to Frank Rizzo; wanted his wife's house demolished while she was out of town, as punishment for her infidelity. ("The Home Wrecker" track from The Jerky Boys album) (voiced by Kamal).
- Curly G., Cradle Rock – a throwback rap artist trying to catch a break; appeared on one track to date ("Bamm!" from The Jerky Boys 3 album) (voiced by Kamal Ahmed).

Other minor characters include:

- Big Ole Badass Bob The Cattle Rustler – an American Westerner/Texan who drives a semi-truck; has appeared on "Lawnmower Sale" and "Bad Ass Massage", both from The Jerky Boys 3 album, "Flower Lady #4" from The Jerky Tapes album, and is a featured character on Sol's Rusty Trombone (voiced by Johnny Brennan).
- Sammy Cox – older man with a pronounced lisp; appeared on one track to date ("Herman" from The Jerky Boys 4 album) (voiced by Johnny Brennan).
- Mike Derucki – an out-of-work painter (voiced by Brennan). Has appeared on several tracks including "Hello Ray" and "Dead Pet Removal".
- Harry Getzov – A name from the "Flower Lady" and "Moonlight Matinee" tracks from The Jerky Tapes album. The character is perennially away from the telephone, and unable to be reached by the unsuspecting caller who is pranked by either Jack Tors (Brennan), Tarbash (Kamal), or Big Ole Badass Bob The Cattle Rustler (Johnny Brennan). In the Jerky Boys CDs, Getzov is credited as the Jerky Boys manager.
- Jake – handles in-coming calls for Mr. Silverman, the phony sports agent ("Silverman baby" track from (The Jerky Tapes) and "Big Hock" track from the Stop Staring at Me! album) (voiced by Johnny Brennan).
- Jake – a truck driver with a penchant for speed and stunts from the track "Hot Rod Mover" (from The Jerky Boys album) (voiced by Johnny Brennan in the exact same voice as Frank Rizzo).
- Anthony Kissel – Frank Kissel's son; appeared on two tracks to date ("Uncle Freddie" from The Jerky Boys' album, and "Laundromat" from The Jerky Boys 4 album). Anthony is also mentioned in "Husband Beating" (from The Jerky Boys 2 album), where Kissel said "I got a couple children, they're a little older right now", but he did not mention his real name (voiced by Brennan).
- Martha Kissel – Frank Kissel's wife; often appears with Kissel. Her voice can be heard in calls such as "Uncle Freddie", "Husband Beating" and "Kissel Sails". On "Uncle Freddie" (from The Jerky Boys album), Kissel reveals his wife's name before he begins arguing with the person who answered the phone about whether Uncle Freddie had died (voiced by Johnny Brennan).
- Nikos – an immigrant Greek delicatessen owner; appeared on one track to date. Nikos often mumbles incoherently, interspersing a few real Greek words within all his gibberish ("Bad Tomatoes" from The Jerky Boys 3 album) (voiced by Johnny Brennan).
- Pico – an abused Mexican immigrant; often hired as Kissel's personal assistant, which invariably has disastrous consequences. When Kissel hires Pico to repair a broken television, the pair end up getting electrocuted. (voiced by Johnny Brennan)
- Paul Rizzo – a car salesman in upstate New York who uses violent techniques to close sales, including choking and threatening customers. Paul appears on only the "Car Salesman" track (from The Jerky Boys album), and is voiced by Johnny Brennan. The character's demeanor and voice are identical to those of Frank Rizzo. The name "Paul" is a result of Brennan mistakenly answering his name as "Paul" instead of Frank when he was trying to remember that he was speaking to someone named Paul.
- Rosine – a flamboyant, flirtatious, Puerto Rican transvestite who plays the flute and aspires to learn sign language. Rosine has a variety of bizarre interests and enjoys slapping herself for sexual gratification. (voiced by Johnny Brennan)
- Silverman – a phony sports agent who convinces an unsuspecting young man that he can earn a job playing baseball for the New York Yankees. ("Silverman Baby!!" track from The Jerky Tapes album) (voiced by Johnny Brennan).
- Brett Weir – name of Johnny Brennan's brother-in-law, mentioned in "Super Across The Way" (from The Jerky Boys album) and "The Gay Model". A character with the same name, portrayed by actor James Lorinz, also appeared in 1995's The Jerky Boys: The Movie.

== Discography ==
=== Albums ===
Album information
The Jerky Boys
- Released: April 1993
- Chart positions: No. 1 Heatseekers, No. 75 Billboard 200 (1993)
- RIAA certification: Platinum
The Jerky Boys 2
- Released: July 1994
- Chart positions: No. 12 Billboard 200, No. 16 Top R&B/Hip Hop Albums (1994)
- RIAA certification: Platinum
The Jerky Boys 3
- Released: August 20, 1996
- Chart positions: No. 18 Billboard 200 (1996)
- RIAA certification: Gold
The Jerky Boys 4
- Released: October 1997
- Chart positions: No. 63 Billboard 200 (1997)
Stop Staring at Me!
- Released: May 18, 1999
- Chart positions: No. 117 Billboard 200 (1999)
The Jerky Tapes
- Released: April 10, 2001

=== Apps ===
Apps information
The Jerky Boys Prank Caller
- Released: March 5, 2010
- Available on: Apple iTunes App Store
- Contains: All-new clips, never-before heard full calls, new Jerky ringtones, and other features.
The Jerky Boys Pinball
- Released: March 5, 2010
- Available on: Apple iTunes App Store
- Contains: All-new recorded sound clips.

=== Johnny B. ===
Album information
Sol's Rusty Trombone
- Released: March 20, 2007
Jerky Boys: Unreleased EP
- Released: 2012
Rolling Stone Calls
- Released: Feb 24, 2014
The Jerky Boys
- Released: Nov 27, 2020

=== Kamal ===
Album information
Once a Jerk, Always a Jerk
- Released: April 4, 2000

=== Soundtrack albums ===
Album information
Jerky Boys: The Movie
- Released: January 24, 1995
- Chart positions: No. 79 Billboard 200
- Singles: "Gel" by Collective Soul, "Dial A Jam" by Coolio & the 40 Thevz

=== Compilation albums ===
Album information
The Best of the Jerky Boys
- Released: October 22, 2002
The Ultimate Jerky Boys Collection
- Released: October 24, 2004

== Film and TV appearances ==
- Space Ghost Coast to Coast (1994)
- Don't Hang Up, Tough Guy! (1995)
- The Jerky Boys: The Movie (1995)
- Big Money Hustlas (2000)

== Legacy ==
Rolling Stone cited Paul Feig, Amy Schumer and Seth MacFarlane as examples of comedy influenced by the Jerky Boys.

- In Cannibal! The Musical, near the end of the movie, after the Indian chief cuts the rope holding Parker as he is being hanged, Frenchy cries out, "Hey! You can't do that, jerky!", in reference to the Jerky Boys, because Trey Parker and the others loved the Jerky Boys (before they saw their movie).
- The Jerky Boys were sometimes referenced on Arrested Development as one of the only albums the character George Michael owns. On a couple of occasions he is seen placing prank calls in an attempt to imitate them.
- Brennan appears on Family Guy as recurring character Mort Goldman, using his Sol Rosenberg voice. Goldman also shares many characteristics with Rosenberg.
- In 2008, comedian Peter Kay included a version of the Free Nelson Mandela song by the Jerky Boys in his parody show Peter Kay's Britain's Got the Pop Factor... and Possibly a New Celebrity Jesus Christ Soapstar Superstar Strictly on Ice for Channel 4 in the UK. It was part of a medley and mixed the last two syllables of Mandela into the Rihanna hit Umbrella.
- The Jerky Boys are referenced in the How I Met Your Mother episode "Duel Citizenship" and again in "False Positive," when Lily mistakenly plays a track to her unborn child instead of classical music.
- The Jerky Boys are referenced in the Fresh off the Boat episode "Keep 'Em Separated" when Nicole offers the CD's that originally belonged to her ex-boyfriend.
- The title of English alternative rock band Radiohead's debut album, Pablo Honey, is a reference to a Jerky Boys prank call skit in which the prank caller says, "Pablo, honey? Please come to Florida!" to his victim. This snippet is sampled by the band on the track "How Do You?".
- The title of English shoegaze band Slowdive's second album, Souvlaki, is a reference to a Jerky Boys skit in which the prank caller tells a Greek hotel manager "My wife loves that Greek shit. She'll suck your cock like souvlaki."
- The 1998 single "Dog in the Piano" by British electronic musician Indian Ropeman samples dialogue from the skit "Piano Tuner".

== See also ==
- Roy D. Mercer
- Crank Yankers
- Longmont Potion Castle
- List of practical joke topics
- Touch-Tone Terrorists
- Tube Bar prank calls
