= Big Money Hustlas =

2000 American comedy film by John Cafiero

- Home video release poster
- Directed by: John Cafiero
- Written by: Joseph Bruce
- Produced by: John Cafiero; Suzanne Cafiero
- Starring: Violent J Shaggy 2 Dope; Harland Williams; John G. Brennan; Rudy Ray Moore; Jamie Madrox; Monoxide Child; Myzery the Misfits
- Cinematography: James Carman
- Music by: Mike E. Clark
- Distributed by: Island Def Jam Music Group; Psychopathic Films; Non-Homogenized Productions Ltd.
- Release dates: July 18, 2000 (Home video release); July 21, 2000 (Novi Expo Center, Novi, Michigan (premiere))
- Running time: 105 minutes
- Country: United States
- Language: English

Big Money Hustlas is a 2000 American comedy film directed by John Cafiero as his feature film debut. The film, a homage to exploitation films of the 1970s, focuses on a streetwise San Francisco detective who tries to take down a New York City crime lord. It stars Insane Clown Posse's Joseph "Violent J" Bruce and Joseph "Shaggy 2 Dope" Utsler, and Twiztid's Jamie Madrox and Monoxide Child, and features appearances by Harland Williams, Johnny Brennan, Rudy Ray Moore, WWF professional wrestler Mick Foley, and the Misfits. Released on direct-to-video on July 18, 2000 to coincide with the Gathering of the Juggalos and later first screened on July 21, 2000 at the Novi Expo Center in Novi, Michigan, the film debuted at #1 on Billboard's Top Music Videos chart, and was later certified platinum by the RIAA. A Western genre follow-up, Big Money Rustlas, was released direct-to-video on August 17, 2010.

== Plot ==
Sugar Bear (Shaggy 2 Dope), a streetwise detective from San Francisco, is brought to New York City by its chief of police (John G. Brennan) to take down Big Baby Sweets (Violent J), a notorious crime lord who controls the entirety of the city's criminal underworld with his right-hand men Big Stank (Jamie Madrox) and Lil' Poot (Monoxide Child), and his personal security ninja Hack Benjamin (Robert Bruce). After getting a firsthand look at the police force's incompetence via Officer Harry Cox (Harland Williams), Sugar Bear prevents a robbery of a local doughnut shop by one of Big Baby Sweets' thugs, Ape Boy, and begins a romance with a 300-pound stripper, Missy (Sindee Williams).

He soon arrests Big Baby Sweets, Big Stank and Lil' Poot himself, but the police are forced to let them go because of a lack of evidence. The gangsters retaliate by terrorizing the city and sending a pair of stealthy Magic Ninjas to murder Missy, leading Sugar Bear to depressed alcoholism. Sugar Bear's idol, Dolemite (Rudy Ray Moore), appears before him to reassure him and begin training him to bring down Sweets' evil empire. Sugar Bear kills the Magic Ninjas and Hack Benjamin, and has Big Stank and Lil' Poot carted off by their wealthy, upper-class parents before defeating another one of Big Baby Sweets' henchmen, Cactus Sac (Mick Foley), in a wrestling match. During Big Baby Sweets' personal confrontation with Sugar Bear, Sweets is shot by his mother, and Sugar Bear removes Sweets' face paint, revealing him to be Harry Cox.

== Cast ==
- Violent J — Big Baby Sweets / Ape Boy
- Shaggy 2 Dope — Sugar Bear
- Harland Williams — Officer Harry Cox
- John G. Brennan — The Chief
- Rudy Ray Moore — Dolemite
- Jamie Madrox — Big Stank
- Monoxide Child — Lil' Poot
- Myzery — Green Willie
- Alex Abbiss — Hazad
- Kayla Kleevage — Phat Tittie Kittie
- Fred Berry — Bootlegg Gregg
- Sindee Williams — Missy
- Bob Greenberg — Magic Ninja 1
- Lee Willet — Magic Ninja 2
- Stefan Kudek — Dr. Dinglenut
- Mick Foley — Cactus Sac
- Jumpsteady — Hack Benjamin
- Floyd Vivino — Announcer

== Production ==
Big Money Hustlas was inspired by the video Big Ballers. Insane Clown Posse and Twiztid had seen the movie and loved the video's low-budget comedy style. Using the ideas that he, Joseph Utsler, James Spaniolo, and Paul Methric created, Joseph Bruce wrote the entire script himself in one month. Island Records gave him $250,000 to produce the film.

Big Money Hustlas was shot in New York. Most of the crew disliked the movie and the cast. They went on strike twice, while only a few crew members continued to work. The movie was shot in two months, but went way over budget. Halfway through the movie, Bruce had to pay $100,000 of his own money to continue filming. Island never paid the crew for the last two weeks of work due to the film going so far over budget.

The movie features many friends of Insane Clown Posse. Mick Foley was brought in as his "Cactus Sac" persona that the duo has used in their Strangle-Mania videos. Robert Bruce, Joseph Bruce's brother, also appears in the movie in multiple personas which include The Preacher, Hack Benjamin, and an officer. Harland Williams appeared at the request of Joseph Bruce, who was grateful and impressed that Williams, who had appeared in major studio productions such as Half Baked and There's Something About Mary, would be willing to appear in a low-budget independent film like Big Money Hustlas. John G. Brennan and Kamal Ahmed of The Jerky Boys appeared separately, because they were unable to get along with each other during the filming.

In contrast with the members of the production who received the movie negatively, Bruce gave bonuses to some cast and crew, including Foley, Rudy Ray Moore, and Williams. Even though Jerry Only only appeared in a small cameo with his band The Misfits, he stuck around for the entire shoot. Jerry Only's son plays the altar boy in the opening scene.

Violent J also appeared in a gorilla costume as "Ape Boy"; Jamie Madrox recorded a dub for the character's voice. Although a production company was paid $8,000 to replace the original audio with the dub, they told the director that they were unable to do it, and a decision was made to instead keep the original audio track, with Violent J's voice.

== Soundtrack ==
Big Money Hustlas

Soundtrack album by various artists
- Released: June 26, 2002
- Genre: Hip hop
- Label: Psychopathic
- Producer: Mike E. Clark

The film's music was written by Psychopathic Records producer Mike E. Clark. A soundtrack album was released in 2002, and featured new music from the film, in addition to previously released tracks by Insane Clown Posse and Twiztid, and the theme to the 1976 film The Human Tornado, performed by Rudy Ray Moore. While not included in the official soundtrack, key songs from the movie were used from Gert Wilden's album Schoolgirl Report. The song "Girl Faces" was used during the bedroom love scene, and "Little Girls" played in the background at the gentlemen's club. Gert Wilden was noteworthy for erotic music in the 1970s, and thus the reason his music was used in the film.

#	Title	Time	Performer(s)
1	"Intro"	0:33	
2	"Big $"	3:55	Violent J, Twiztid
3	"Sugar Bear"	3:16	Shaggy 2 Dope
4	"Fuck the World"	4:03	Insane Clown Posse
5	"Cotton Candy"	4:36	Insane Clown Posse
6	"Bury Me Alive"	4:17	Twiztid
7	"Bring It On"	3:55	Insane Clown Posse
8	"Ninjas"	4:58	Insane Clown Posse
9	"Bitches"	3:27	Insane Clown Posse, Ol' Dirty Bastard
10	"Rock the Dead"	5:14	Twiztid
11	"Spin the Bottle"	4:41	Insane Clown Posse, Twiztid
12	"The Human Tornado"	2:23	Rudy Ray Moore

== Impact ==
Big Money Hustlas debuted at #1 on Billboard's Top Music Videos chart. On January 23, 2009, the film achieved platinum certification. A follow-up, entitled Big Money Rustlas, began filming in mid-January 2009 and concluded on February 24, 2009. Based in the Western genre, Big Money Rustlas was released on DVD on August 17, 2010. The record label Majik Ninja Entertainment, formed by Twiztid in 2014, is named after a line which they delivered in the film.

== Certifications ==
Region	Certification	Certified units/sales
United States (RIAA)	Platinum	100,000^{^}
^{^} Shipments figures based on certification alone.
