= China Kantner =

American actress (born 1971)

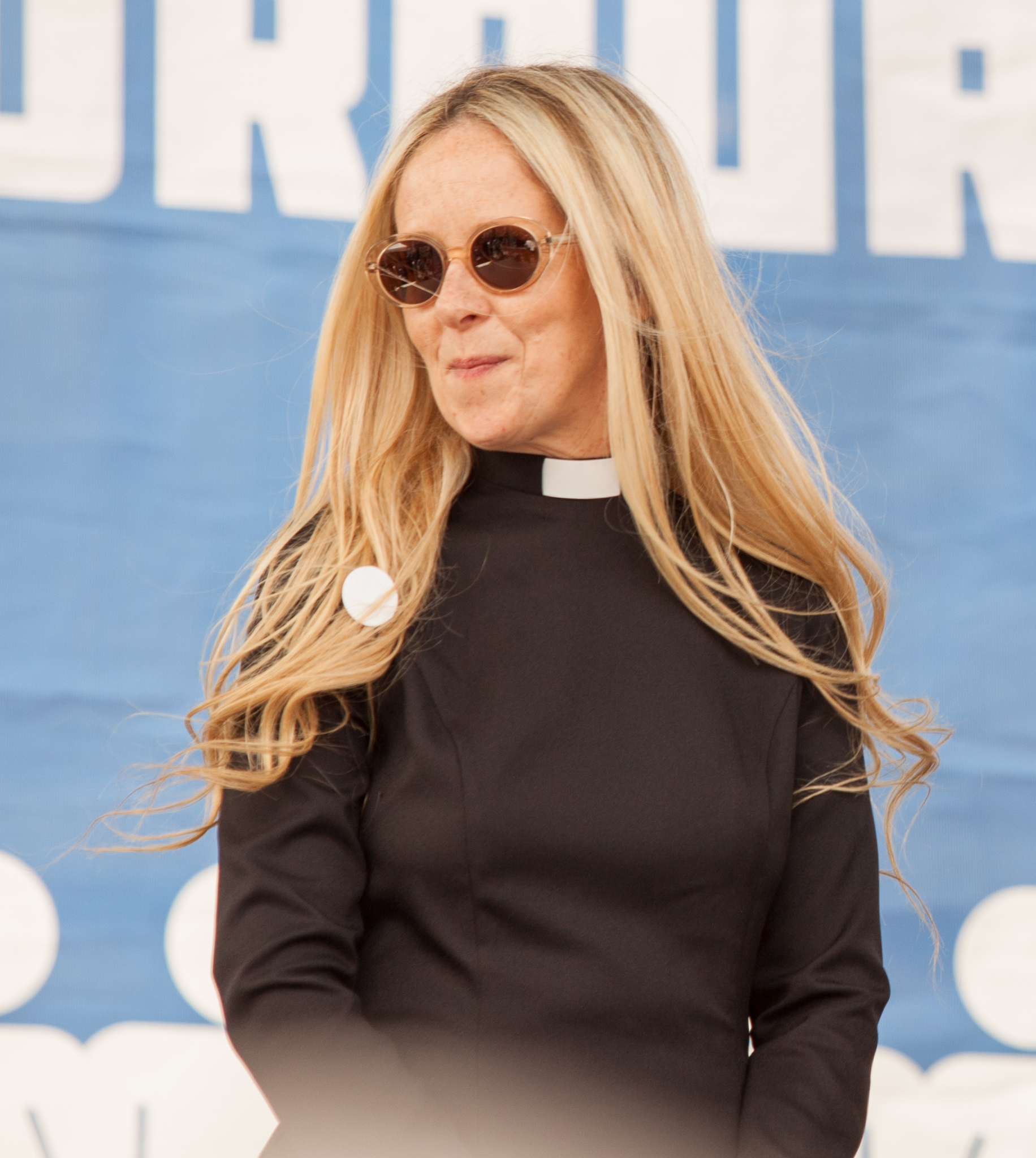
- As pastor China Isler, at the March for Our Lives in San Francisco, March 2018
- Born: China Wing Kantner; January 25, 1971 (age 55); San Francisco, California, U.S.
- Other names: China Slick Kantner; China Azdair; China Isler
- Education: Loyola Marymount University
- Occupations: Actress, television personality, songwriter
- Years active: 1994–2001
- Spouses: Jamie Azdair (m. 1999; div. 2006) Seth Isler (m. 2011)
- Parent(s): Grace Slick; Paul Kantner

China Wing Kantner (born January 25, 1971) is an American actress in television, theater, and film. She is also a former MTV VJ, sometimes credited on-screen as China Slick Kantner.

== Biography ==
Kantner was born in San Francisco, California, the daughter of two Jefferson Airplane and Jefferson Starship band members, singer Grace Slick (born Grace Wing) and guitarist Paul Kantner. She is a native of San Francisco, living first in the city itself, and later in Mill Valley. She has two half-brothers, one who is older and one who is younger.

A common misbelief is that her name was originally "god" (with a small "g"), and was only later changed to "China". However, Jeff Tamarkin's 2003 book on the history of Jefferson Airplane, Got a Revolution: The Turbulent Flight of Jefferson Airplane, explains this resulted from a sardonic remark made by her mother to a nurse.

Later in her MTV career, she was credited simply as "China Kantner". In January 1988, she was interviewed by Jonathan King for the BBC TV show Entertainment USA as part of a feature on the children of rock stars working as MTV VJs. During this interview, she stated that, while she initially did not like her name, she grew to like it as she got older.

She first appeared as an infant on the cover of the Kantner/Slick 1971 solo LP Sunfighter. She has been given co-songwriting credits by her father on several of his songs. She also sang a song on his 1983 album Planet Earth Rock and Roll Orchestra.

=== MTV and radio ===
In July 1986, she appeared as a guest VJ on MTV, which led to her making regular appearances for the next four years during her summer vacations. When she started working for the station at the age of 15, she was, at the time, the youngest MTV VJ ever. As an MTV VJ, she interviewed her father for the MTV Summer of Love 20th anniversary celebrations. For a while around 1989, she also presented a Saturday night phone-in request show on a local Bay Area radio station, KRQR-FM.

=== Acting ===
Having started off acting in school plays, Kantner has appeared in several movies (such as Airheads, The Stoned Age and The Evening Star), television sitcoms (notably Home Improvement) and stage plays. Her 1998 appearance in season seven of Home Improvement as the recurring character Willow Branch Leaf Wilson (she 'pruned' the name back to Willow Wilson) was her final professional acting role, and she has now retired from acting. She did, however, provide a few brief quotes for Jeff Tamarkin's book on the history of Jefferson Airplane.

=== Personal life ===
Like her mother, Kantner has, over the years, struggled with alcoholism. She has been sober since about 1998. She contributed a section to the book Playing It Straight by David Dodd, alongside her mother and other recovering substance abusers such as Dennis Hopper, Steven Tyler, and Ozzy Osbourne. In 1999, she married a Los Angeles dentist, Jamie Azdair, although the couple divorced in 2006. While they were married, she preferred to be known by her married name of China Azdair. On April 13, 2011, Kantner married actor and producer Seth Isler and now prefers to be known as China Isler.

After retiring from acting, she studied art history at UCLA. In 2007, she obtained a degree in Christian theology (with a minor in English) at Loyola Marymount University. In a 2007 interview, her mother stated, "My daughter loves studying Jesus. Some friends of hers turn their nose up at that. They don't understand that she is not talking about churches and what churches say; she is studying the actual words and message of Jesus." Since graduation Kantner became a Minister of Substance Use Disorder and Recovery at UrbanMission in Pomona, California; as of 2017, being the Faith Leader/Liaison at Facing Addiction.

=== Musical career ===
Kantner has, over the years, made several contributions to the music of Jefferson Starship as both songwriter and singer. However, she has also commented in interviews that she has no real musical aspirations of her own, claiming that she cannot sing very well. She has also said that having well-known musicians for parents actually lost her several parts, as directors automatically assumed she was also musical.

Kantner has several songwriting credits on various Jefferson Starship albums. The first is for the song "Don't Let It Rain", from the 1976 album Spitfire. This was followed by credits for "Things to Come" (Freedom at Point Zero, 1979), "Out of Control" (Winds of Change, 1982), and "The Sky Is No Limit" on her father's 1983 solo album Planet Earth Rock and Roll Orchestra.

Kantner appeared as credited lead vocalist on the song "Declaration of Independence" and contributing vocalist on "The Sky Is No Limit" and "Let's Go", all of which appear on Planet Earth Rock and Roll Orchestra. She also made an uncredited appearance on the songs "Wooden Ships" and "Volunteers" on the 1995 live album Deep Space/Virgin Sky, which was later re-released in an expanded form as Deeper Space/Extra Virgin Sky.

== Career ==
Theater According to her agency resume, Kantner appeared in the following productions:

- Batman - The Ensemble Theatre Company, San Francisco, California.
- Flying Hormones - The Ensemble Theatre Company, San Francisco, California.
- Touch Me - The Ensemble Theatre Company, San Francisco, California.
- The Two Orphans - The Ensemble Theatre Company, San Francisco, California.

Television Kantner has appeared as an actress in the following TV shows:

- Monty, as Geena (series regular), Touchstone/Fox Broadcasting, 1994.
- Murphy Brown, as Beth (guest star), Warner Brothers/CBS TV, 1996.
- Too Something (aka New York Daze), as Jennifer (guest star), Warner Brothers/Fox Broadcasting, 1996.
- L.A. Firefighters, as Flame (recurring character), 20th Century Fox/Fox Broadcasting, 1996.
- Grace Under Fire, as Waitress (guest star), Carsey-Werner/ABC TV, 1997.
- Home Improvement, as Willow Branch Leaf Wilson (recurring character), ABC TV, 1998.

She has also appeared as herself as a guest or contributor on the following shows:

- China Kantner's Guest VJ Hour, MTV, July 1986 to circa 1990.
- Behind The Music - Jefferson Airplane, VH1 TV, April 5, 1998.
- The Home & Family Show, The Family Channel, July 6, 1998.
- Politically Incorrect, ABC TV, November 26, 1999.

Film Kantner has appeared in the following films:

- Three of Hearts, as unknown character, New Line Films, 1993.
- The Stoned Age (aka Tack's Chicks), as Jill, Trimark Films, 1994.
- Airheads, as Female Rocker, 20th Century Fox, 1994.
- S.F.W., as Female Pantyhose Gunman, Black Dog Productions, 1994.
- Grace of My Heart, as Singer on beach, Universal Pictures, 1996.
- The Evening Star, as Jane, Paramount Pictures, 1996.
