= Dr. Tangalanga =

Argentine comedian (1916–2013)

- Born: Julio Victorio De Rissio; 10 November 1916; Buenos Aires, Argentina
- Died: 26 December 2013 (aged 97); Buenos Aires, Argentina
- Occupations: Comedian; writer
- Years active: 1964–2013
- Labels: DBN; Radio Tripoli

Julio Victorio De Rissio (10 November 1916 – 26 December 2013), better known by the stage name of Dr. Tangalanga, was a popular Argentine comedian known for his humorous prank phone calls to unsuspecting recipients.

== Career ==
Born in the Balvanera neighbourhood of Buenos Aires to Italian Argentine immigrants, De Rissio worked in a shoe factory during his early years. He began recording prank calls in the mid-1960s to provide comic relief for a bedridden friend. He released over 40 albums of prank calls since 1989, selling over 250 thousand copies, arguably becoming the most famous prank call artist in the Spanish-speaking world. He made extensive use of Argentine Lunfardo vernacular, and his tapes have been praised by critics as varied as humorist Carlos Loiseau and philosopher Alejandro Rozitchner.

== Discography ==
- Los llamados telefónicos del Dr. Tangalanga vol. 1 (1989)
- Los llamados telefónicos del Dr. Tangalanga vol. 2 (1990)
- Los llamados telefónicos del Dr. Tangalanga vol. 3 (1990)
- Los llamados telefónicos del Dr. Tangalanga vol. 4 (1990)
- Los llamados telefónicos del Dr. Tangalanga vol. 5 (1991)
- Los llamados telefónicos del Dr. Tangalanga vol. 6 (1991)
- Los llamados telefónicos del Dr. Tangalanga vol. 7 (1991)
- Los llamados telefónicos del Dr. Tangalanga vol. 8 (1992)
- Los llamados telefónicos del Dr. Tangalanga vol. 9 (1993)
- Los llamados inéditos del Dr. Tangalanga vol. 1 (1994)
- Los llamados inéditos del Dr. Tangalanga vol. 2 (1995)
- Los llamados inéditos del Dr. Tangalanga vol. 3 (1995)
- Los llamados inéditos del Dr. Tangalanga vol. 4 (1996)
- Dr. Tangalanga: Cuentos con amigos (1996)
- Los mejores llamados telefónicos del Dr. Tangalanga vol. 1 (1996)
- Los mejores llamados telefónicos del Dr. Tangalanga vol. 2 (1996)
- Los mejores llamados telefónicos del Dr. Tangalanga vol. 3 (1997)
- Los llamados de oro del Dr. Tangalanga (1997)
- Dr. Tangalanga es mundial, first Octavio's appearance (1998)
- Dr. Tangalanga en vivo (1998)
- Dr. Tangalanga: Llamados violentos (1998)
- Dr. Tangalanga: Cuentos con amigos (1998)
- Dr. Tangalanga: Colección privada vol. 1 (1998)
- Dr. Tangalanga: Colección privada vol. 2 (1998)
- Dr. Tangalanga: Colección privada vol. 3 (1999)
- Dr. Tangalanga: Colección privada vol. 4 (1999)
- De parte de Tangalanga (2000–2001)
- Tangalanga ataca de nuevo (2002)
- ¿En qué sentido me lo dice? (2002)
- ¿Me da su teléfono? (2003)
- WANTED (por matar de risa) (comp. 1980–1999) (2003)
- 40 Años Currando – Solo editado en Mexico – Para el show del Hard Rock Cafe, only released in Mexico (2004)
- Tangalanga en México (2004)
- Maestro 2005 (2005)
- 10 de noviembre de 2006 La Trastienda Club (Official Bootleg) (2006)
- Noventa pirulos y todavía te rompo (2006)
- Rioplatense (2006)
- Te sobra un número (2007)
- ¿Me puedo tomar confianza? (2007)
- ¡Olé, olé, olé! ¡Doctor! ¡Doctor! (2008)
- Mil gracias Uruguay (2008)
- Dr. Tangalanga: Colección privada vol. 5 (comp.) (2009)
- Dr. Tangalanga: Trapisondas (2010)
- Dr. Tangalanga: cuentos con amigos 2 (2010)
- Dr. Tangalanga: Tejemanejes (2011)
