= Phone Losers of America =

Online prank call community

- Formation: 1994
- Purpose: e-zine/Phreaking/Prank call
- Headquarters: Portland, Oregon, U.S.
- Region served: International
- Platforms: Internet
- Founder: Brad Carter (RBCP)
- Known for: The Snow Plow Show e-zine PLA Radio; Voice bridge Forums
- Website: phonelosers.com

The Phone Losers of America (PLA) is an internet prank call community founded in 1994 as a phone phreaking and hacking e-zine. Presently, the PLA hosts a prank call podcasts such as the Snow Plow Show, which has been active since 2012.

== History ==
The Phone Losers of America was founded by Brad Carter and Zak (el_jefe) in 1994, in an era when landlines were plentiful. Zak currently maintains a USA payphone directory.

The Phone Losers Of America published 46 issues of informative and comedic computer hacking files from 1994 - 1997.

After the Dino Allsman incident, Carter left Illinois and travelled to Corpus Christi, Texas. During the trip, he wrote issues 14 & 15. He also ended up running his own BBS called Whombat Communications, where he published issues 16-34.

During his last 6 months in Corpus Christi, Carter started calling BBSes all over the world to promote his PLA issues and promoting the creation of a PLA directory for the previous 34 issues. He decided to move to Oregon with his family. During that week the Belleville News-Democrat did 2 front page stories on the PLA and one editorial.The news coverage caused problems for Carter, as the police attempted to arrest him after another trip to Illinois to visit his parents. However, the police missed him by a few hours.

In 1995, Zak and another member named "Apok0lyps" pooled their money to start a business in Granite City, Illinois called RoyCo. The pair rented out a building and started selling computer systems before setting up an internet service provider called spiff.net. Months later the pair moved to Corpus Christi after selling the company.

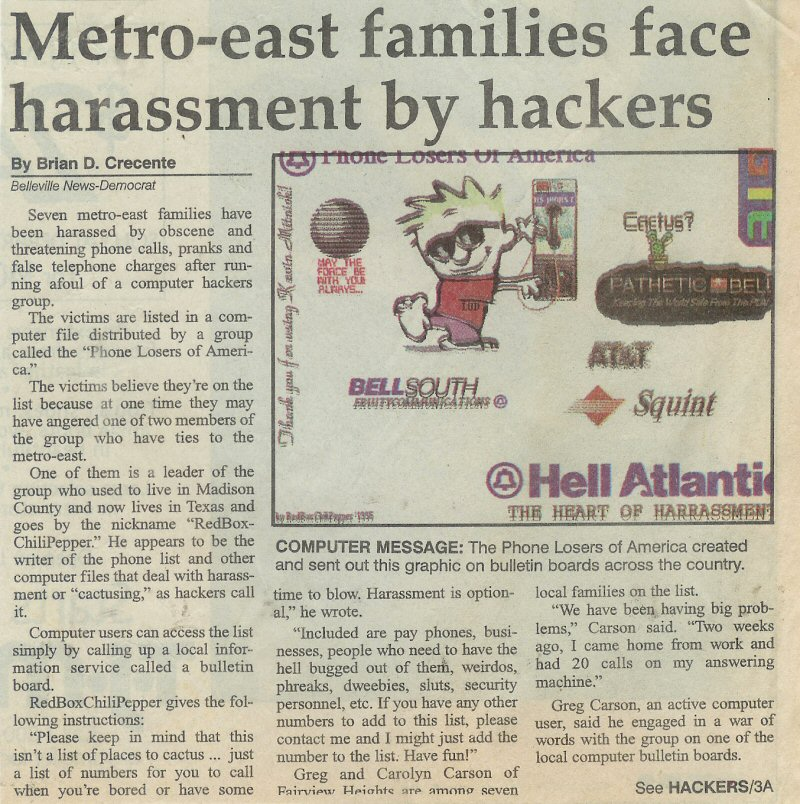
PLA news bulletin Belleville news-democrat

With the introduction of Caller ID Spoofing in the early 2000s, groups such as the PLA became notable for their utilization of the service for prank calling. Spoofing was commonly used to imitate law enforcement and corporate office numbers.

Throughout the 2000s, PLA email lists and discussion forums remained active, and Carter released a number of episodes of PLA TV. In 2002, he started an internet-based radio station called "PLA Radio", followed by a podcast of the same name in 2006. In 2012 after 29 episodes of PLA Radio, Carter started a new podcast called "The Snow Plow Show" which is still active as of 2026.

In August 2015, the Columbia Daily Tribune featured the PLA in an article about a series of "strange calls" received by local residents who had signed a petition against a crosswalk construction project. The article quoted an FBI representative who allegedly told the Tribune that the calls to Columbia residents "would likely be prosecuted on the local level."

In early November 2016, Carter reported that the FBI performed an early-morning raid on his recording studio, resulting in a temporary seizure of all technical equipment. The raid was triggered by an attempt to access customer profiles at numerous retail stores across the country, primarily Safeway, of which some were utilized for prank phone calls. The case was treated as a federal matter, and was presided over by Judge Marco A. Hernandez of the Federal District Court of Oregon. On October 16, 2017, Judge Hernandez sentenced Carter to eight months of home detention, followed by five years of probation. Carter must pay $19,600 in restitution to Safeway as a consequence.

== Activities ==
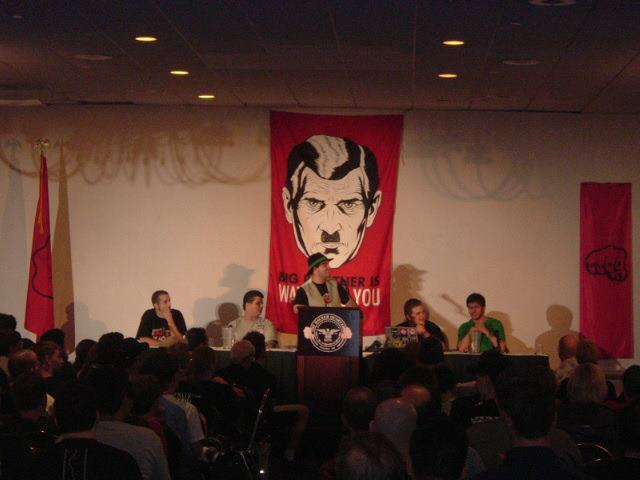
The PLA giving their panel at the 2004 Hackers on Planet Earth convention

The PLA maintains an archive of answering machine messages in text-based format, which Motherboard has described as being the "ringtones of their day".

The PLA has adopted the catchphrase "cactus", which dates back to an old prank call made by one of Carter's friends 'Amigados'. He would frequently make prank calls using nothing but the word "cactus", which would confuse the call's recipient.

In 2016, the PLA organized a month-long event called "Dingtember". This event has since become an annual group tradition, taking place each September. The core prank involves listeners of the show leaving anonymous notes on cars that read: "Sorry I dinged your car, please give me a call - Roy" and include a phone number made public by the show.
