= James Melkonian =

American screenwriter and film director (born 1961)

James Melkonian

James Melkonian (born April 6, 1961) is an American screenwriter and film director. He wrote and directed the films The Stoned Age (aka: Tack's Chicks) and The Jerky Boys: The Movie.

Melkonian has also worked as a film editor and post-production executive as well as an advertising writer, producer and director.

== Filmography (as writer and director) ==
- The Stoned Age (1994)
- The Jerky Boys: The Movie (1995)
