= Alejandro Rozitchner =

Argentine writer

- Born: 1960 (age 65–66); Buenos Aires, Argentina
- Occupations: Writer, journalist, musician
- Writing career
- Genres: Novels, essays, scripts

Alejandro Rozitchner (born 1960 in Buenos Aires) is an Argentine writer. "Artist of the ideas" or "intellectual nutritionist" are some of the names with which he describes his work. He is characterized by his affirmative thinking, his appreciation for enthusiasm (a concept on which he has published numerous articles and also a topic of several conferences), and for his open, casual, and provocative style.

== Biography ==
Alejandro Rozitchner has a bachelor's degree in philosophy from the Universidad Central de Venezuela.

He is the author of the novels El despertar del joven que se perdió la revolución (1998), Pernicioso vegetal (1999), Bienvenidos a mi (2003), and La venganza del oyente, published in 2008. He also wrote Argentina Impotencia. De la producción de crisis, a la producción de país (2002), Amor y País. Manual de discusiones (2005), and Hijos sin dios. Cómo criar chicos ateos, with his wife, Ximena Ianantuoni.

As a professional scriptwriter, he has written humorous scripts for the shows El palacio de la risa, with Antonio Gasalla; La cueva del chancho, with Juan Acosta, and joined the scriptwriter's staff of El circo Romano, with Gerardo Romano.

In 1991 he was the bassist in the first album of Illya Kuryaki and the Valderramas, "Fabrico Cuero". Subsequently, in 2000, he recorded an album with the band Juan Acosta y los navegando por dentro, artistically led by Argentine actor and humorist Juan Acosta.

In radio, he was a columnist for Mario Pergolini' s program, Cual es, at the Rock and Pop. The columns of 2002, a series of national rock lyrics that were interpreted from a philosophical standpoint, were grouped together in the book Escuchá qué tema. La filosofía del rock nacional. The opinion columns of 2003, were published in his book Ideas falsas. Moral para gente que quiere vivir (2004).

In television, he hosted his own program, "100 volando TV," and during 2005 and 2006 he participated in "Hora Clave", Mariano Grondona's program.

He writes articles and opinion columns for various publications, such as La Nación newspaper, Noticias magazine, Diario Ciudadano de Mendoza and Cronista Comercial.

As an inspirational speaker, he works at companies giving lectures on enthusiasm and creativity. He also conducts workshops and courses on philosophy and writing.

He worked at the Government of the City of Buenos Aires.

== Politics ==
He is an advisor to Mauricio Macri, former President of the Argentine Nation.

== Bibliography ==
1992 "La filosofía para chicos. Diario de una experiencia". Essay. Buenos Aires, Libros del Quirquincho.( Reissued in 2001, Buenos Aires, Editorial Santillana).

1993 "Saquen una hoja. Manual de supervivencia para el estudiante secundario", with Mario Pergolini. Buenos Aires, Editorial Planeta.

1993 "Conciencia rockera. La experiencia del mundo". Essay. Buenos Aires, Ediciones de la Flor.

1994 "Cómo educar a los padres", with Mario Pergolini. Buenos Aires, Editorial Planeta.

1998 "El despertar del joven que se perdió la revolución". Novel. Buenos Aires, Editorial Sudamericana.

1999 "Pernicioso vegetal". Novel. Buenos Aires, Editorial Sudamericana.

2000 "Tirados en el pasto", with Andrés Calamaro. Buenos Aires, Editorial Sudamericana. (2001. Madrid, Biblioteca Efe Eme)

2002 "Argentina Impotencia. De la producción de crisis, a la producción de país". Essay. Buenos Aires, Libros del Zorzal.

2003 "Escuchá qué tema. La filosofía del rock nacional". Essay. Buenos Aires, Editorial Planeta.

2003 "Bienvenidos a mi". Novel. Buenos Aires, Editorial Sudamericana.

2004 "Ideas falsas. Moral para gente que quiere vivir". Essay. Buenos Aires, Editorial Del Nuevo Extremo.

2005 "Amor y País. Manual de discusiones". Essay. Buenos Aires, Editorial Sudamericana.

2006 "Pensar para hacer. Cómo transformar la filosofía en una experiencia real". Essay. Editorial Santillana.

2007 "Hijos sin dios. Cómo criar chicos ateos", with Ximena Ianantuoni. Essay. Buenos Aires, Editorial Sudamericana.

2008 "La venganza del oyente". Novel. Buenos Aires, Editorial Del Nuevo Extremo.
