= Text roulette =

Act of sending a text message to a random phone number

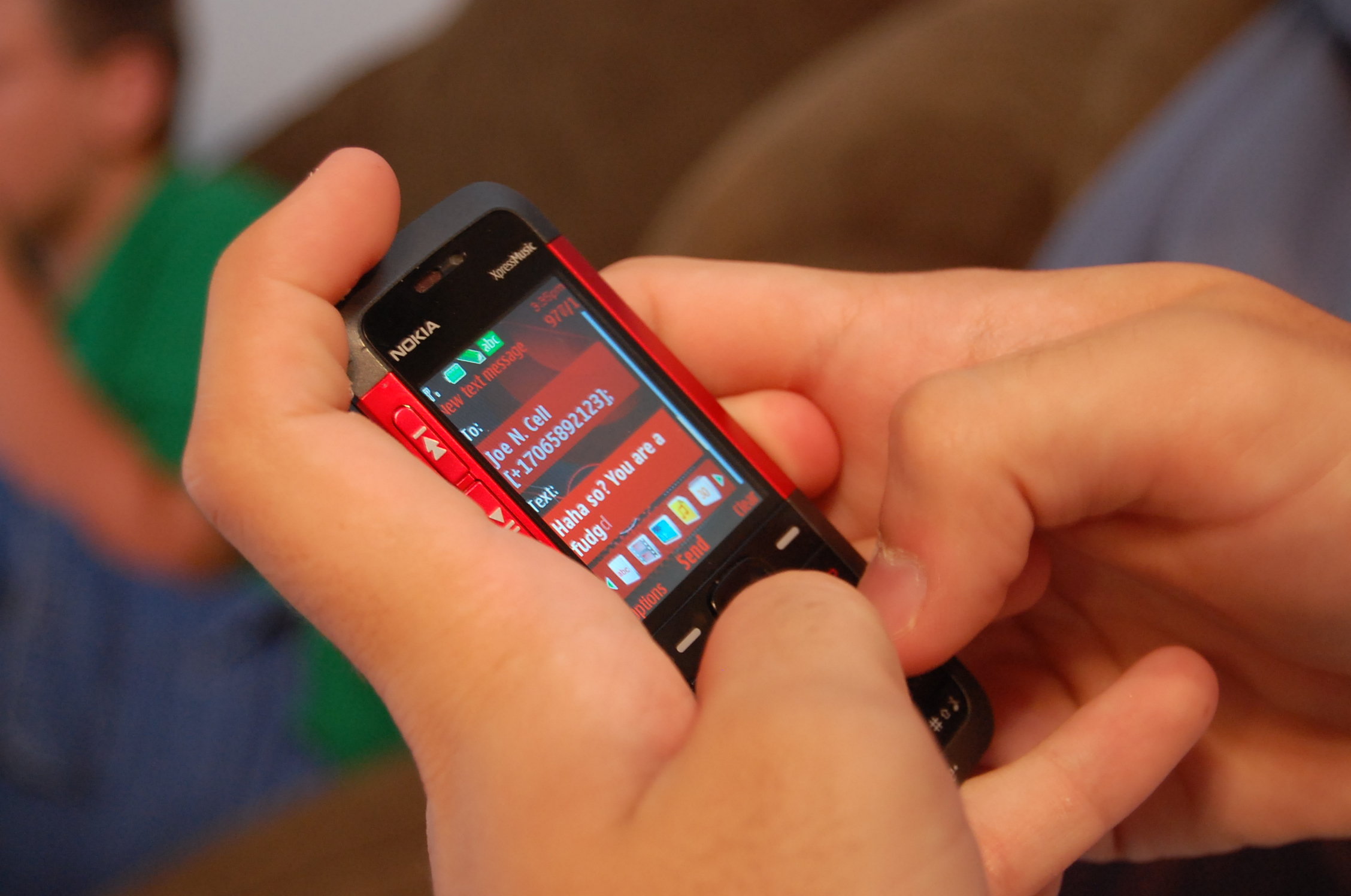
A person typing a text message

Text roulette or SMS roulette is a game played chiefly by schoolchildren, in which they compose a text message on their mobile phone then send it to one of their contacts or a made-up number at random.

== Popular use ==
BBC Radio 1 disc jockey Scott Mills makes regular use of texting as a form of entertainment. In an early form of the game in 2007, he encouraged listeners to send "I love you" messages to a contact at random.

In a 2010 episode of Channel 4 sitcom The Inbetweeners, the four main characters play text roulette with each other's phones.

The BBC One series Michael McIntyre's Big Show, broadcast since 2015, includes a "send to all" segment where the host asks a guest to send an embarrassing message to everyone on their contacts list.

== Demographics of users ==
In 2010, a United Kingdom survey of people aged 13 to 16 found that one in five had played a variation of the game in which the message must be obscene. A similar proportion had sent texts to previously unknown mobile numbers typed in at random, asking for the recipient to reply. Motivations included loneliness, "fun" and boredom, while 9% admitted being "dared" to do it. Of those who had played text roulette, one in three admitted to being in trouble from the recipient.

== Dangers ==
Neil McHugh, who had commissioned the survey, said it showed that young people did not realize the dangers of texting unknown numbers.

A writer for business organisation ICAEW commented that text roulette is a modern variation on an old pattern, i.e. young people finding ways to irritate adults by doing what is forbidden, but raises concerns about child safety.

In October 2010, Textslide debuted as an application that enables people to easily and safely engage in SMS conversations with strangers.

== See also ==
- Chatroulette
- Omegle
- Zumbl
