= John Swartz =

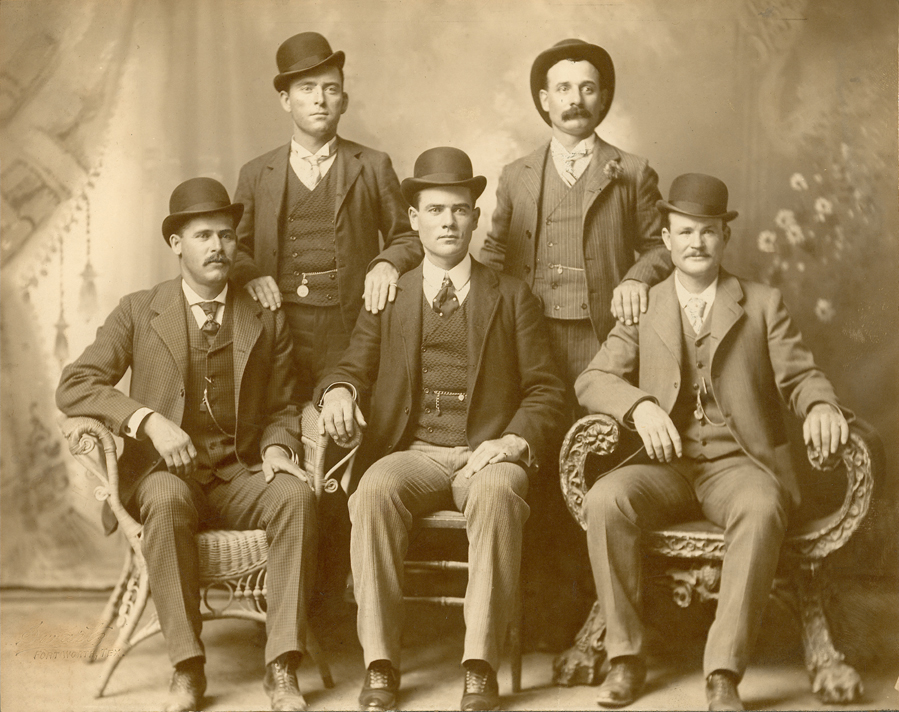
The Wild Bunch

John Swartz (1858–1930) was a photographer in Fort Worth, Texas, USA, in the late 19th and early 20th centuries. He is notable for taking the only known portrait of Butch Cassidy's Wild Bunch gang of outlaws. A copy of this iconic photograph is in the collection of the Smithsonian Institution's National Portrait Gallery (United States)

The Swartz brothers – David, John, and Charles – were three Virginia farm boys who ventured west, arriving in Fort Worth in the mid-1880s. Over the next 30 years, they observed the city through a camera lens, snapping pictures of people, events, and architecture – leaving a priceless legacy. They collectively produced thousands of photographs that were scattered to the four winds after their deaths. Hundreds of those images have survived, although the brothers themselves are largely forgotten.

The best-known photograph shows the five members of the “Wild Bunch” (aka, the “Fort Worth Five”) posed in John's studio in 1900. His studio was located at 705½ Main Street upstairs over John P. Sheehan's Saloon. The studio was on the edge of the red-light district known as "Hell’s Half-Acre"—the town's vice district consisting of a concentrated area of saloons, gambling halls, dance parlors, bawdy houses catering to the rough and rowdy tastes of the Chisholm Trail cowboys. One can imagine the outlaws having a few drinks at Sheehan's then trooping upstairs to get their picture taken. Sometime later, an unnamed Fort Worth detective was in Swartz's studio and recognized two or three men in a photo John had on display. The detective ordered sent the photo to the Denver office of the Pinkerton National Detective Agency who were leading the nationwide search for the gang. The Pinkerton's printed large quantity of “Wanted” circulars and blanketed the country with them. By May 15, 1901, those circulars were in the hands of lawmen from Nevada to Minnesota. That infamous image immortalized the gang and is credited with helping bring about their downfall.

Swartz's extensive photographic chronicle of early Fort Worth served as the inspiration of a major downtown revival and historical preservation development known as “Sundance Square.” The Swartz brothers’ cumulative work provides a visual chronicle of late 19th- and early 20th-century Fort Worth as well as a window into American life during that era.
