= Gentner =

Gentner is a surname of German origin. The first records of the Gentner name can be traced back to Württemberg, southwest Germany, in the late 1300s.

== Etymology ==
Various sources provide different theories regarding the meaning and origin of the surname, though a reliable proof does not yet exist to verify these speculations.

=== German origins ===
Ancestry.com claims that the name is a variant of the Ganter surname, which has roots in the south of Germany. The speculation is that Ganter is an occupational surname, derived from the middle high German word, "gant", which is loosely translated to mean "auctioneer" or the term "kanter ganter", which translates to "barrel rack". The Gentner surname is believed to have been initially given to auctioneers or those who made barrels for a living, also known as coopers.

=== French origins ===
Ancestry also traces the Ganter surname to Alsace–Lorraine, France. Again, this explanation supposes that the name is occupational in origin. The surname is said to have derived from the middle English term "ga(u)nter", or an old French term, "gantier", which translates to "maker of gloves".

=== Norse origins ===
Author Max Gottschald claims that the Gentner surname is derived from the German word "gand", which has roots in the old Norse words "gandy", meaning "magician" and "gandr", meaning "werewolf". The Gentner surname may also have derived from the French/German name Günther, meaning "battle-army", which also has roots in old norse. The surname Günther is said to have derived from the old norse word "gunnr", which means "battle", or the Proto-Germanic word "gunþiz", which means "act of killing". Gunnr is also the name of a Valkyrie in Norse mythology.

== Notable people ==
Notable people with the surname include:

- Christian Gentner (born 1985), German football player
- Dedre Gentner, American psychology professor
- Guy Gentner, Canadian politician
- Philip J. Gentner (1872–1941), American museum director
- Thomas Gentner (born 1988), German footballer
- Wolfgang Gentner (1906–1980), German nuclear physicist

== See also ==
- Gentner Drummond, American politician
- Else Gentner-Fischer (1883–1943), German opera singer
- Willy Schmidt-Gentner (1894–1964), German film score composer
