= Kamal Ahmed (comedian) =

American Director, Producer, Writer and Comedian (born 1966)

- কামাল আহমদ
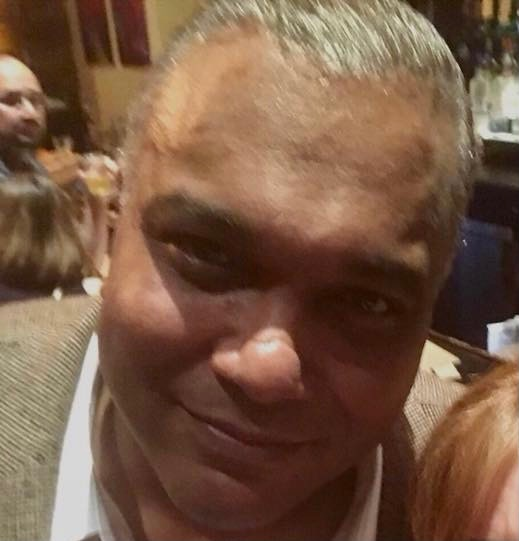
- Born: East New York, Brooklyn, New York City
- Occupations: Writer, director, producer, musician, comedian
- Years active: 1984-present

Kamal Ahmed (Bengali: কামাল আহমদ; born May 7, 1966), commonly known as Kamal, is an American director, comedian, and a former member of prank phone call comedy group The Jerky Boys.

== Early life and career ==
Kamal was born in East New York, Brooklyn and raised in Astoria, Queens and the Lower East Side of Manhattan. His father, Manir Ahmed, a former chemical engineer, started the restaurant "Shah Bagh" in the East Village, which eventually led to him owning a string of Indian restaurants in an area that became known as "Little India". Kamal's mother, originally from Trinidad and Tobago, worked for the United Nations. His sister, a chemical engineer, has worked for major pharmaceutical companies. Kamal developed an early interest in music and has become an accomplished bass guitar player and scores many of his productions.

Kamal was a founding member of The Jerky Boys and co-starred with John G. Brennan in the 1995 Touchstone comedy film The Jerky Boys: The Movie. He played Kissel, a World War II veteran; Tarbash the Egyptian Magician; Curly G. Cradle-Rock, and other characters on the Jerky Boys albums. Kamal also appeared in "Punch", a 1994 episode of Space Ghost Coast to Coast. Tensions began to rise between Brennan and Kamal during the filming of The Jerky Boys movie and their collaboration deteriorated further during the production of Big Money Hustlas, in which Kamal appeared in a cameo appearance.

In 2000, Kamal released a solo album titled Once a Jerk, Always a Jerk. He has made multiple television and radio appearances, including on Late Night with David Letterman, Late Night with Conan O'Brien and The Howard Stern Show. Kamal has also acted in and directed several films, including Laugh Killer Laugh, which was completed in 2015. In 2022, Kamal released his first mini-series, Crash the System, which was distributed on streaming media platforms worldwide.

== Filmography ==
As of 2022, Kamal has directed 8 full-length films and 1 TV mini series.

Directed features
Year	Title	Notes
2003	God Has a Rap Sheet	Writer, director, producer
2007	Rapturious	Writer, director, producer
2008	Uncle Freddy	Writer, director, producer
2010	Circus Maximus	Executive producer, producer
2012	1000 Times More Brutal	Writer, director, producer
2012	Brutal	Director
2015	Laugh Killer Laugh	Writer, director, producer
2018	The Martyr Maker	Writer, director, producer
2022	Crash the System	8 Episode mini series, writer, director, producer

Acting Roles
Year	Title	Role	Notes
1984	ABC Afterschool Specials	(uncredited)	TV series, 1 episode
1995	The Jerky Boys: The Movie	Kamal	
1995	The Jerky Boys: Don't Hang Up, Toughguy	Kamal	Video
1997	Men in Black	Voice of cab driver (ADR, uncredited)	
2000	Big Money Hustlas	Old man Kissel, security guard (as Kamal)	
2001	The Rules (For Men)	Ashalama	
2002	I Fouska	Cuban taxi driver	
2002	Paper Soldiers	Shawn's boss	
2003	The Sweet Life	Cabdriver	
2003	Mail Order Bride	Buddha	
2005	Survive This	Kamal	
2006	Beer League	Umpire #3	
2007	Rapturious	Cabdriver	
2007	Never Down	Cop	
2015	Laugh Killer Laugh	Detective 1	
2016	Terrifier	Voice on phone (voice)	
