= Johnny Brennan =

American actor

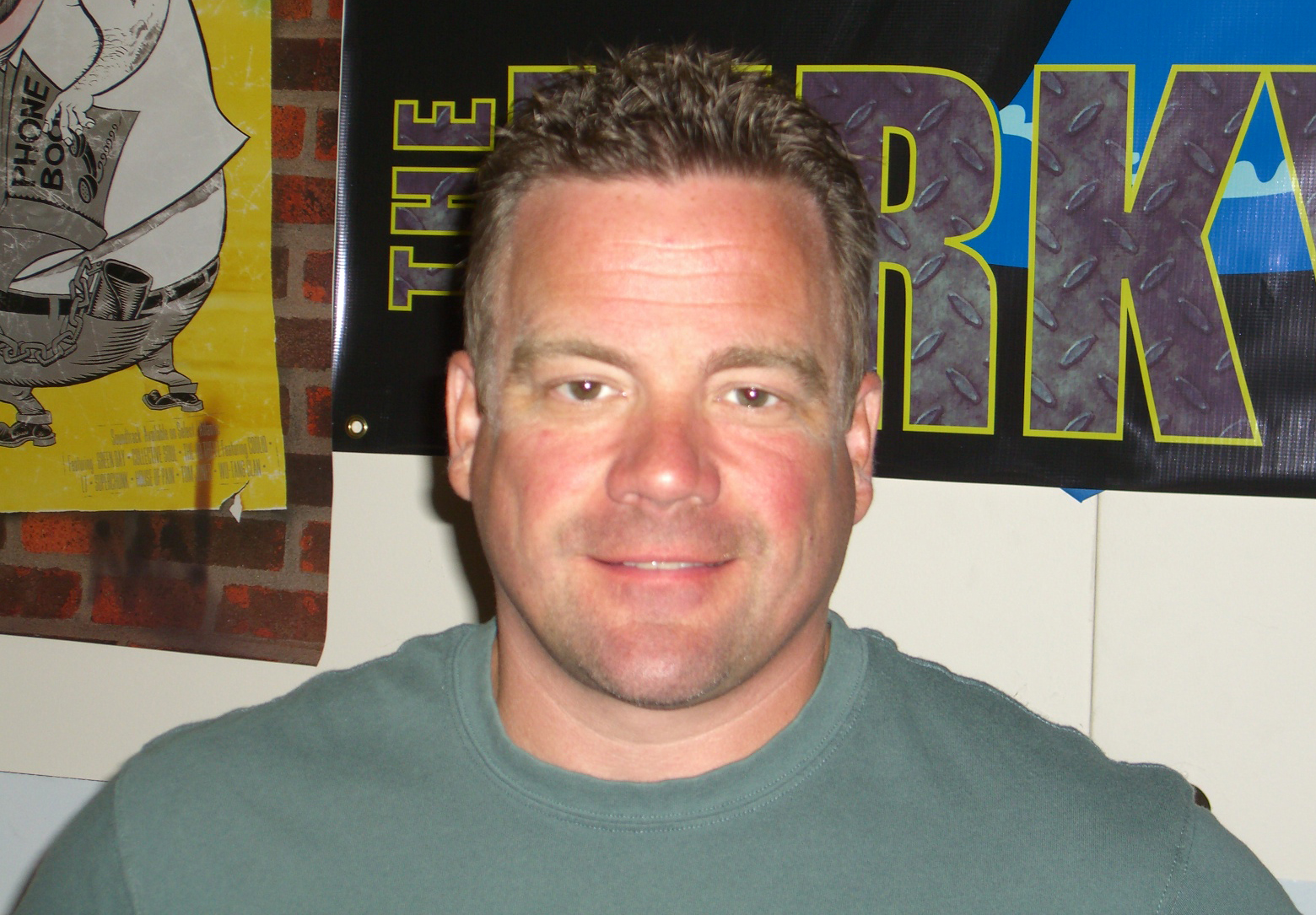
- Brennan at the Big Apple Convention, June 8, 2008
- Born: December 1, 1961 (age 64); Manhattan, New York, U.S.
- Occupations: Actor; voice actor; comedian; writer
- Years active: 1983–present

Johnny Brennan (born December 1, 1961) is an American actor, voice actor, comedian, and writer, known as the creator of The Jerky Boys, which released a series of prank phone call CDs, between 1993 and 1999.

He appears as himself as a member of the Jerky Boys in an episode of Space Ghost Coast to Coast in 1994.

In 1995, Johnny Brennan wrote and starred with Kamal Ahmed in a motion picture portraying the antics of Johnny's Jerky Boys characters called The Jerky Boys: The Movie (the film was shot between April and June 1994). In 1997, Johnny appeared in the Mariah Carey music video "Honey".

Brennan later became known for his voice work in the Emmy-nominated animated series Family Guy, where he performs the voices of Mort Goldman and Horace the bartender of the Drunken Clam.

In 2007, Brennan released Sol's Rusty Trombone without Ahmed. It was the first Jerky Boys release since 2001. In April, Brennan reprised his role of Frank Rizzo on the animated web series Clock Suckers in the episode "If You Can't Beat 'Em, Then You're a Pussy".

== Filmography ==
=== Film ===
Year	Title	Role	Notes
1995	The Jerky Boys	John / Frank 'Rubberneck' Rizzo	
2000	Big Money Hustlas	The Chief / Misfits Roadie	
2005	Stewie Griffin: The Untold Story	Horace / Additional Voices (voice)	Direct-to-video
2018	Mind of Its Own	Rocco	
2020	Metrics	Dicky	Short Film

=== Television ===
Year	Title	Role	Notes
2000–present	Family Guy	Mort Goldman / Horace / Zima Bottle / Various Characters (voice)	93 episodes

=== Music videos ===
Year	Title	Artist(s)	Role	Ref.
1997	"Honey"	Mariah Carey	Kidnapper	
2026	"Twisting the Knife" (Parts 1 & 2)	Ice Nine Kills featuring Mckenna Grace	Francis Rizzowitz	

=== Video games ===
Year	Title	Role	Notes
2012	Family Guy: Back to the Multiverse	Mort Goldman	
2014	Family Guy: The Quest for Stuff	Mort Goldman	
