= Prank call =

Phone call intended as a joke or prank

A prank call (also known as a crank call, a hoax call, or a goof call) is a telephone call intended by the caller as a practical joke played on the person answering. It is often a type of nuisance call and can be illegal under certain circumstances.

Recordings of prank phone calls became a staple of the obscure and amusing cassette tapes traded among musicians, sound engineers, and media traders in the United States from the late 1970s. Among the most famous and earliest recorded prank calls are the Tube Bar prank calls tapes, which centered on Louis "Red" Deutsch. Comedian Jerry Lewis was an incorrigible phone prankster, and recordings of his hijinks, dating from the 1960s and possibly earlier, still circulate to this day.

One victim of prank callers was Elizabeth II, who was fooled by Canadian DJ Pierre Brassard posing as Canadian Prime Minister Jean Chrétien, asking her to record a speech in support of Canadian unity ahead of the 1995 Quebec referendum. Another example is that of the prank calls made by the Miami-based radio station Radio El Zol. In one such call, they telephoned Venezuelan president Hugo Chávez and spoke to him pretending to be Cuban president Fidel Castro. They later reversed the prank, calling Castro and pretending to be Chávez. Castro began swearing at the pranksters live on air after they revealed themselves.

== Early examples ==
British physicist R. V. Jones recorded two early examples of prank calls in his 1978 memoir Most Secret War: British Scientific Intelligence 1939–1945. The first was by Carl Bosch, a physicist and refugee from Nazi Germany, who in about 1933 persuaded a newspaper journalist that he could see his actions through the telephone (rather than, as was the case, from the window of his laboratory through the window of the journalist's flat). The second was by Jones in about the same year at Oxford University, pretending to be a telephone engineer, convinced a chemistry research student that there was a fault with his telephone. The student was persuaded to do such things as sing loudly into the telephone, and hold it by the flex while standing first on one leg then on the other. He finally had to be physically restrained by one of Jones' colleagues (who was in on the joke) from lowering it into a bucket of water.

== Anonymity ==
Prank callers can now be easily found through caller ID, so it is often asserted that since the 1990s, prank calls have been harder to accomplish and thus waning in popularity. Most telephone companies permit callers to withhold the identifying information from calls using a vertical service code that blocks the caller's ID (*67 in North America, 141 in the UK), but potential victims may be reluctant to answer a call from an ID-blocked number. Wiretapping by several governments have also made prank calls easier to trace. Callers can also call from payphones in order to hide their identity, although this is becoming less common as pay phones began to phase out in the 2000s. The advent and advancements in digital switching technologies such as those found in SS7, unspoofable ANI, as well as outbound and inbound calls being logged at carrier exchange equipment, further complicate the pranksters will to remain anonymous while carrying out such activities.

Another increasingly popular option is to use some form of VoIP. With some VoIP services, the telephone number will simply not exist. These calls are extremely difficult to trace since they may pass through servers and routers operated by multiple corporations or entities in various countries. Although law enforcement agencies may theoretically be able to find where a VoIP call originates from if they tried, in practice, the amount of time, effort, and resources required would be too significant to use on ordinary prank calls.

== Political leaders ==
Sometimes, prank callers are able to connect with political leaders. In December 2005, a commercially operated radio station in Spain (COPE – owned by a series of institutions affiliated with the Catholic Church) played a prank on Bolivian president-elect Evo Morales. The hoaxster pretended to be Spanish Prime Minister José Luis Rodriguez Zapatero, congratulating Morales on his election and saying things like, "I imagine the only one not to have called you was George Bush. I've been here two years and he still hasn't called me". In an inversion of the typical pattern, in 2020 Russian opposition leader Alexei Navalny used a prank call to convince an FSB agent to admit poisoning Navalny earlier that year. George W. Bush was prank called by two Russian citizens in 2022; during this call, Bush stated, "I wanted Ukraine into NATO."

== Prank calls and the Internet ==
Ever since the opportunity has been available, there have been multiple internet radio stations dedicated to prank calls. Most of them feature a so-called "rotation" of prank calls, which is a constant broadcast of various prank calls submitted by the community, usually streamed from a SHOUTcast server host. Software such as Ventrilo has allowed prank calls to be carried out to a more private user-base, however, in real-time.

The internet has allowed many people to share their own personal prank calls and develop into communities. Prank calls can be carried out in many ways; live or pre-recorded. Web platforms such as Prankcast.com allow show hosts like Phone Losers of America to send live show alerts to their followers and broadcast prank calls live to their listeners, who can also chat with the host and discuss on-goings in real-time. The use of social networking and the popularity of user generated content also allows these prank calls to spread and popularity to grow.

A flaw of Craigslist and other social media sites is that it allows one to post telephone numbers without a means of confirming they own the number. A common ruse to generate prank calls is to post someone's name and phone number in an enticing Craigslist post. If this is done in a location with a different time zone than the victim, the victim may receive large number of phone calls at an inconvenient time. Craigslist, and many other sites, have a policy of not releasing the identity of the original poster without a court order. In Washington state, one cannot file an anti-harassment order against an anonymous person, leading to a catch-22 situation.

== Legal issues ==
Some prank calls are criminalized in many jurisdictions, for instance if the call involves calling the emergency services, while others may be protected as freedom of expression. For example, in the US, for a prank call to fall afoul of the Telecommunications Act, 47 U.S.C. § 223(a)(1), the call must be done with the intent to "abuse, threaten, or harass". In Australia, the 2Day FM incident described below was alleged by the Australian Communications and Media Authority to have violated Australian law, but on the grounds that the recorded call was publicly broadcast without the other party's consent.

Rudimentary criminal 'pranks' may range from simple telephone harassment to bomb threats. One such hoax call occurred in Perth, Western Australia, on New Year's Eve 2002, when a drunk teenager called the new anti-terrorist hot line to report a bomb threat against the New Year's Eve fireworks celebrations. The threat was taken seriously, and the celebrations were about to be cancelled when police discovered that no such threat existed. The teenager was then arrested for the false report.

More elaborate pranks rely on tricking the recipient into harmful behavior. An example of these was the 1996–2004 strip search phone call scam, in which a prankster posing as a police officer was able to cause store managers to strip search female employees. More recently, the Pranknet virtual community has been credited for causing tens of thousands of dollars in damage to many hotels and fast food restaurants. Posing as authority figures, such as fire alarm company representatives and hotel corporate managers, Pranknet participants called unsuspecting employees and customers in the United States via Skype and tricked them into damaging property, setting off fire sprinklers and other humiliating acts such as disrobing. They also post fraudulent ads on Craigslist, and then shout racial epithets and make violent threats of rape and murder against the people who call them to respond to the ads. Pranknet members listen in real-time and discuss the progress together in a private chat room. The group, who flaunted their anonymity, were outed when editors of The Smoking Gun, posing as journalists, persuaded them to visit unique URLs.

A series of prank calls by Joseph Sherer led to convictions and a twenty-year prison sentence for impersonating a physician, criminal endangerment, and aggravated assault. In one call, as described by the Montana Supreme Court, "Sherer, impersonating a sympathetic and caring doctor, instructed the victim to cut off her nipple. The victim's obedient actions flowed directly from Sherer's instructions."

Until his death in 2011, Oklahoma construction worker Frank Garrett was prank called and recorded countless times for his vitriolic reactions. The soundboard community that followed him caused at least three known incidents with the law: two in Kansas City, Missouri, and a third in Houston; both were for threats of violence against residents and the police with his name being used in the process. Both incidents were covered by local FOX News stations.

In 2012, Jacintha Saldanha, a nurse at King Edward VII Hospital who was attending a pregnant Catherine, Duchess of Cambridge, was deceived into transferring a prank call from Mel Greig and Mike Christian, the hosts of the Hot30 Countdown radio program broadcast on 2Day FM in Sydney, Australia, who were impersonating Queen Elizabeth II and Charles, Prince of Wales. The hoaxsters were able to ask the duty nurse questions about the duchess' health, making the answers public. Saldanha was later found dead in a suspected suicide. The incident and the following death received intense media coverage and triggered an investigation, but no charges were laid.

== Popular culture ==
Two early and famous prank phone calls are the "refrigerator" gag and the "Prince Albert" gag. The first involves calling a target to ask "is your refrigerator running?" When the responder says "yes", the prankster replies "Well, you'd better go catch it!" The second requires calling a commercial establishment to ask if they have "Prince Albert in a can". If the reply is yes, the prankster responses with "Then you'd better let the poor guy out!" The origin of both of these jokes is unknown, although it is theorized they may have been adapted from vaudeville routines rather than any single real-life incident. They have since been repeated in multiple outlets, though less for their comedic value than to convey the idea of a "prank phone call".

Bart Simpson's prank calls to Moe's Tavern are a running joke in early seasons of The Simpsons, as Bart would call Moe asking for people whose names are actually double entendres. Examples include "Mike Rotch" (my crotch), "Bea O'Problem" (B.O. problem) and "Al Coholic" (alcoholic). Moe would then announce the call to the bar patrons in a way that would cause himself embarrassment ("I'm lookin' for Amanda Hugginkiss [i.e. a man to hug and kiss]"), prompting Moe to threaten Bart with some manner of violent and gruesome fate. Occasionally Bart's prank would backfire when a person with such an unusual name happened to be present, as in the episode "Flaming Moe's" when Bart asks for "Hugh Jass" (huge ass), only for a man with the same name to answer. In another episode, "Donnie Fatso", criminal ringleader Fat Tony calls to ask for his business partner, "Yuri Nator" (urinator). Believing this to be another prank call, Moe tells him off, resulting in Moe being targeted by Fat Tony's thugs.

"Weird Al" Yankovic's song "Phony Calls" (a parody of "Waterfalls" by TLC, featured on his 1996 album Bad Hair Day) deals with prank phone calls; the song directly references both the "refrigerator" and the "Prince Albert" gags, and contains samples of Bart Simpson prank calling Moe's Tavern.

In John Carpenter's horror thriller, Halloween, a group of friends tease one another with prank calls as a Halloween trick. During one such prank, Lynda is strangled by Michael Myers while in the midst of a phone call with Laurie. Laurie, assuming it is another friend making a prank call, hangs up on Lynda's cries of distress.

Some performers such as The Jerky Boys, Tom Mabe and Roy D. Mercer, made a name for themselves producing albums of their recorded prank calls.

Sal "the Stockbroker" Governale and Richard Christy, writers on The Howard Stern Show, have made various prank calls to public access shows, talk radio, radio stations, and normal people at home. They also have a fictional radio show called the "Jack and Rod show" where they call a major celebrity for an interview and prank them with sound effects or fake guests such as Cousin Brucie (where Howard imitates a famous radio host while using an exaggerated version of his signature speech patterns) and many other pranks.

The television show Crank Yankers is a series of real-life prank calls made by celebrities and re-enacted on-screen by puppets for a humorous effect.

Fonejacker, a show started on April 4, 2007, on E4, stars Kayvan Novak performing prank calls to the general public and being shown with animated pictures in a Monty Python style with their mouths moving and live recordings as the victim receives the call.

Beginning in early 2011, 4chan organized a prank calling of the Gold and Silver Pawn Shop, home to the popular television show Pawn Stars. The callers would repeatedly ask the employees if they sold Battletoads, a video game for the Nintendo Entertainment System notorious for its difficulty. This call led Rick Harrison, owner of the store, to repeatedly swear and yell at the prank callers, who recorded this and uploaded it to YouTube. This originated several other similar videos of pranksters dialing random establishments and asking about Battletoads. Battletoads developer Rare has acknowledged the prank via an achievement named "Do You Have Battletoads?" in their 2015 game compilation Rare Replay.

== See also ==
- Bomb threat
- Caller ID spoofing
- Email spoofing
- Fonejacker
- Great Phone Calls Featuring Neil Hamburger
- List of practical joke topics
- Longmont Potion Castle
- Malicious Caller Identification
- Obscene phone call
- Phone Losers of America
- Phone scam
- Scam baiting
- Soundboard (computer program)
- The Jerky Boys
- The Masked Avengers' prank on Sarah Palin
- Text roulette
- Touch-Tone Terrorists
- Tube Bar
- Performers
  - Steve Allen
  - Guido Hatzis
  - Dr. Tangalanga (Julio Victorio De Rissio)
