= George Earth =

American songwriter (born 1966)

- Born: July 3, 1966 (age 60); Paterson, New Jersey, U.S.
- Origin: Santa Cruz, California, U.S.
- Occupations: Songwriter; Guitarist; Comic book artist Talk show host
- Instrument: Guitar
- Years active: 1982–present
- Label: Independent
- Website: www.georgeearth.com

George Earth (born July 3, 1966) is an American musician, guitarist, songwriter, composer, music producer, comic book artist, and talk show host from Echo Park, California. He is perhaps best known as the lead guitarist for both World Entertainment War and Switchblade Symphony, later touring and recording with Angel Corpus Christi, Stolen Babies, and other bands before forming Los Angeles-based Small Halo in 2008. He publishes a semi-regular comic book series and hosts a regular talk show, The Talk Show, in which he also leads The Talk Show Band.

== Biography ==
George Earth was born in Paterson, New Jersey in 1966. He lived in Athens, Greece briefly as a child between 1969 and 1970 before moving back to New Jersey with his parents. He lived briefly in California in 1976 and then moved back to Red Bank, New Jersey, where at age 13, he started playing guitar. He left Red Bank in 1980 and moved to Santa Cruz, California, where he attended high school and formed his first band with his two best friends, Gabe Butterfield and Keith Graves, who attended two other local high schools. Butterfield played drums and is the son of blues legend Paul Butterfield. Graves had played bass guitar until Earth joined them, whereupon Butterfield and Earth forced him to play guitar with them instead. Graves now performs with Prairie Prince and Quicksilver Messenger Service.

Earth's first serious recording was around 1982, on a record with Cyrille Verdeaux, on which he played guitar.

George found work in 1983 as a roadie for the Santa Cruz band Tao Chemical and its percussion offshoot, Tao Rhythmical, where he got to know the drummer for both bands, Rick Walker, who would connect him with some other key musicians in the region.

About 1985, Earth and vocalist and lyricist Xtremity X worked across the street from one another, met, and formed Heaven On. He played guitar to her lyrics, which she sang, and they soon gathered a pair of other young artists, the rhythm team of drummer Anthony Guess, who was a percussion student of Rick Walker's, and bassist Kevin Nuckolls, with whom Guess had played in several bands before. Keyboardist Kennedy Cosker, of The Quiet Ones, joined them at the last minute to compete in a contest, and together, the five-member band won the 1986 Battle of the Bands at the Louden Nelson Center for Performing Arts in Santa Cruz. Heaven On disbanded soon after that performance, though Earth, Guess, and Nuckolls would form a separate improvisation project that year, Circus Boy, performing one show in that grouping, at Diane's Place in Santa Cruz, before Earth and Guess began to jam with bassist Daniel Vee Lewis, Lewis' wife, Pipa Piñon, and keyboardist David Hannibal.

In 1986, Earth and Anthony Guess together conceived of the unnamed band that would later become World Entertainment War. Earth played lead guitar and co-wrote songs with drummer Guess. They invited both Daniel Vee Lewis and David Hannibal to play bass and keyboards, respectively, for the new group, which still remained nameless. Rick Walker suggested they contact another local musician friend of his, Rob Brezsny, also of Tao Chemical, who was developing a new and broad idea that he called "World Entertainment War". After seeing Brezsny perform a spoken word show to a pre-recorded music tape, they did a jam show together a few weeks later. Brezsny was invited to join the band as lead vocalist and co-writer and together they then adopted the name and the concept, World Entertainment War. Singer Darby Gould was recruited six months later to join the band as co-lead vocalist. Keyboardist Hannibal left the band shortly and was replaced briefly by Sam Loya, who was then replaced by Amy Excolere. They performed regularly and recorded two albums; a self-titled debut and a follow-up called Give Too Much, consisting of the same recordings with two added tracks recorded at the same time, both released in 1991 by MCA Records. Earth continued doing live performances with World Entertainment War in a variety of venues until the group disbanded in 1993.

That same year, Earth joined singer, songwriter, and accordionist Angel Corpus Christi as her international touring guitarist. In 1993 he formed a guitar and cello band called The Endorphines with Martha Burns of Amber Asylum playing the cello. That band auditioned drummers, including Eric Gebow, whom Earth would later form an improv duo with and who would later bring Earth into Switchblade Symphony.

In 1995, Earth joined Switchblade Symphony, with composer Susan Wallace and vocalist Tina Root, replacing Robin Jacobs on lead guitar. They released several recordings on Cleopatra Records, including Bread and Jam for Frances in 1997 and The Three Calamities in 1999, and they toured internationally for over four years in support of both albums, before disbanding in 1999; with Root going on to form the band Tre Lux. Earth and Root performed the final shows of Switchblade Symphony in 2000.

From 2001 to 2003, George Earth played guitar in Captain Bringdown, with bassist Paula O'Rourke and drummer John Weiss, and appears on their 2002 self-titled album, recorded at Hyde Street Studios in San Francisco. Weiss was later replaced by Thievery Corporation drummer El John Nelson, who later played on Earth's 2004 solo CD, Love Songs.

During that period he also did session work with several groups. He played guitar for Angel Corpus Christi; appearing on her 2003 CD recordings, Divine Healer and Louie Louie (a tribute to Lou Reed). He recorded with Shards, a guitar and drum duo he formed with drummer Mark Pino of Birdsaw. He did some session work with his former World Entertainment War bandmate, Rob Brezsny, and also with Caroline Blind's project, Sunshine Blind, playing guitar on their 2003 release, I Carry You.

George Earth stayed busy during 2003 to 2006, writing, recording and producing his own solo albums as Candymachine, aka Candymachine88, including Water, released on iTunes, and one song on each of the two albums he produced for Cleopatra Records; "Mr. Self Destruct" on Covered in Nails: A Tribute To Nine Inch Nails and "Ava Adore", with Tina Root, on A Gothic–Industrial Tribute to The Smashing Pumpkins. The album he produced for Tributized Records in 2006, Piggy: A Tribute to Nine Inch Nails, also featured he and Root performing as Candymachine88 on one song, "Mr. Self Destruct".

He played theremin for Red Elvises, recording with Oleg Bernov, Igor Yuzov, and others, on their 2004 studio release, Lunatics and Poets and he also joined Victim's Family guitarist Ralph Spight on his side project, The Freak Accident, playing theremin as well, on their 2004 album, Freak Accident. Also in 2004, Pretend Records released Earth's debut solo album, Love Songs.

In 2007, Earth was brought in to work with Heather Schmid by her producer/co-writer Rich Balmer on her CD, Goddess Awaits. Balmer had also worked with Tina Root, who co-wrote some material on another Schmid album, and Root had suggested to Earth that he work with Balmer. Later in 2007, George went on an international tour as the guitarist for Stolen Babies, replacing guitarist Davin Givhan, who had recently left the band. In 2008, Earth and Tina Root (aka Tina Minero, since 2002) rejoined again to form another music performance project, Small Halo, recording a self-titled 5-song EP that they released in 2009.

Since then Earth has pursued several other activities. He has been scoring music for independent films and television for several years and his recent work has included scoring music for major film trailers.

He continues his professional work and lives on a small farm in Echo Park, California.

== Trivia ==
Earth has also initiated several "joke bands". One early instance of these, dreamed up with his best (non-musician) friend Steve Brown, was the band Barking Crew, releasing the comedy single "Bark Me Betty", as a joke about their slang for fellatio, "barking", as in, "Did she bark your pole?" A later joke band was Fucking Jerks from San Jose, with a song recorded by the same name, created by Earth and another friend.

== Discography ==
With Barking Crew

- Bark Me Betty (1986)

With World Entertainment War

- World Entertainment War (1991) MCA Records
- Give Too Much (1991) MCA Records

Also appears with WEW on
- K-Mart Tribal Ballet on Komotion International Compilation Raizer X Records

With Switchblade Symphony

- Bread and Jam for Frances (1997) Cleopatra Records
- The Three Calamities CD (1999) Cleopatra Records

Also appears with Switchblade Symphony on

- Sinister Nostalgia (2001) (remixes) Cleopatra Records
- Sweet Little Witches CD (2003) Cleopatra Records

With Captain Bringdown

- Captain Bringdown CD (2002)

With Sunshine Blind

- I Carry You (2003)

With Angel Corpus Christi

- Divine Healer (album) CD (2003) Gulcher Records
- Louie Louie (a tribute to Lou Reed) CD import (2003)

With the Red Elvises

- Lunatics and Poets (2004) theremin

With The Freak Accident

- Freak Accident CD (2004) theremin

Solo work

- Love Songs (2004) Pretend Records

With Candymachine88

- Water album iTunes
- Ava Adore (with Tina Root), on A Gothic–Industrial Tribute to The Smashing Pumpkins Cleopatra Records (2001 & 2006) Various artists
- Mr. Self Destruct on Covered in Nails: A Tribute To Nine Inch Nails (Various Artists) Cleopatra Records (2000 & 2006) & Anagram (UK) 2001
- Mr. Self Destruct (with Tina Root) on Piggy: A Tribute to Nine Inch Nails (Various Artists) Tributized Records(2004 & 2006)

With Small Halo

- Small Halo EP (2009)

Production credits

- A Gothic–Industrial Tribute to The Smashing Pumpkins Cleopatra Records (2001 & 2006) Various artists
- Covered in Nails: A Tribute To Nine Inch Nails (Various Artists) Cleopatra Records (2000 & 2006) & Anagram (UK) 2001
- Piggy: A Tribute to Nine Inch Nails (Various Artists) Tributized Records(2004 & 2006)
