= Tina Root =

American singer-songwriter (born 1968)

- Also known as: Tina Minero
- Born: Bettina Root; October 2, 1968 (age 57); Los Angeles, California, U.S.
- Origin: San Francisco, California
- Genres: Dark wave; gothic rock; industrial rock; symphonic rock; trip hop
- Occupations: songwriter vocalist
- Instrument: Voice
- Years active: 1989–2015, 2024–present
- Labels: Cleopatra Records; Independent
- Formerly of: Switchblade Symphony • Tre Lux • Small Halo
- Website: Official website for Tre Lux

Tina Root (born Bettina Root; October 2, 1968), also now known as Tina Minero, is an American classically trained female vocalist and songwriter from Los Angeles, California. She was the lead singer of Switchblade Symphony during the mid to late 1990s. Her latest work included a solo performance and recording project, Tre Lux, and a partnership project, called Small Halo, with guitarist and fellow songwriter George Earth.

== Biography ==
Tina Root was born on October 2, 1968, in Los Angeles, California and still resides there. She is a classically trained vocalist with a background in musical theater. She married in June 2002 and has a daughter, Gabriella Star Minero, who was born in June 2007.

She formed the San Francisco-based band Switchblade Symphony in 1989, with composer Susan Wallace. They performed and recorded with several other band members over the years, including guitarists Robin Jacobs and George Earth, and drummers Eric Gebow, and Scott van Shoick. They released several records on Cleopatra Records, including the critically acclaimed albums Serpentine Gallery in 1995, Scrapbook in 1997, Bread and Jam for Frances in 1997 and The Three Calamities in 1999, and performed international tours in support of those albums until the group disbanded in 1999.

In April 2001, she created the solo trip hop project Tre Lux, performing her first show as Tre Lux in Montreal, Quebec, Canada in January 2002, with the help of San Francisco duo BeatDestruct. She has so far recorded one full-length album as Tre Lux (also known as Tré Lux), entitled A Strange Gathering, released in 2006 and featuring her covers of several other artists' hits, including one from Switchblade Symphony, Bad Trash.

In 2008, she reunited musically with former Switchblade Symphony guitarist George Earth to form Small Halo, a project that has so far recorded one self-titled five-song EP, which they released in 2009.

In 2010, Tina recorded vocals on the MC Lars song, Reaping Beauty, inspired by the SEGA game Bayonetta, which was included on the 2011 second re-release of Lars' album 21 Concepts (But a Hit Ain't One). In 2015, she retired from the music scene and became a realtor, although she announced her return to music in early 2024.

== Discography ==
With Switchblade Symphony

- Full-length albums and EPs
  - Serpentine Gallery (1995)
  - Scrapbook (1997) (out of print)
  - Bread and Jam for Frances (1997)
  - The Three Calamities (1999)
  - Sinister Nostalgia (2001) (remixes)
  - Sweet Little Witches (2003) (live performances and video track)
  - Serpentine Gallery Deluxe (2005)
- Singles
  - Clown (1996)
  - Drool (1997)
- Other
  - Fable (1991) (out of print demo cassette)
  - Elegy (1992) (out of print demo cassette)
  - Girlscout (single) (recorded with Jack Off Jill) (1998)
- Compilations
  - From The Machine, featured the song: "Mine Eyes" (Index Records, 1990)
  - Gothic Rock Volume 2: 80's Into 90's (1995)
  - Gothik (1995) (re-released in 2006)
  - Wired Injections (1996)
  - Gothic Divas Presents: Switchblade Symphony, Tre Lux, and New Skin (Cleopatra, 2006)
  - Psycho Tina's Hell House Of Horrors, featured the song "Witches (Live)" (Cleopatra, )

As Tre Lux

- A Strange Gathering Album (2006) covers

With Small Halo

- Small Halo EP (2009)
