= World Entertainment War =

American funk rock band

- Origin: Santa Cruz, California, U.S.
- Genres: Funk rock
- Years active: 1986–1993; 2000–2001; 2009–present
- Label: MCA
- Past members: George Earth; Anthony Guess; Daniel Lewis; Rob Brezsny; Darby Gould; Amy Excolere; Samuel Loya; David Hannibal; Jay Peterson

World Entertainment War was an American funk rock band, formed in 1986. They recorded four records before disbanding in 1993, and then played reunion concerts in 2000 and 2001, and again in 2009. The band describes itself as “a benevolent media virus programmed to prevent the entertainment criminals from stealing your imagination."

== History ==
In 1986, George Earth and Anthony Guess together conceived the unnamed band that would later become World Entertainment War. Earth played lead guitar and co-wrote songs with drummer Guess. They invited both bassist Daniel Vee Lewis and keyboardist David Hannibal, with whom they had recently been jamming, to play with the new group, which still remained nameless. Rick Walker of Tao Chemical, Guess's drum teacher, suggested they contact another local musician friend of his, Rob Brezsny, also of Tao Chemical, who was simultaneously developing a new and broad idea that he called "World Entertainment War". The band went to see Brezsny perform a spoken-word-to-tape show with Brezsny using a backing tape, called World Entertainment War, that he had recorded in Echo Park, California with fellow Tao Chemical member Michael Haumesser. They did a jam show together a few weeks later and Brezsny joined the band as lead vocalist and co-songwriter.

In 1986, the five, Earth, Guess, Lewis, Hannibal, and Brezsny, became World Entertainment War; adopting Brezsny's nascent concept and name. They practiced and performed regularly, keeping one song, "Prayer Wars", from Brezsny and Haumesser's original recording in their repertoire. They recorded an album of their earliest work, called Telepathics Anonymous.

Singer Darby Gould was recruited to join the band as co-lead vocalist six months later, by Brezsny, having heard her performing at UC Santa Cruz with a band called Ricardo's Bandoleros. As recalled by Gould in a 2006 interview, during the summer she graduated from college, 1986, Brezsny heard her sing Janis Joplin and Whitney Houston songs, sitting in with a cover band called The Same, at a garage after-party following a softball game. According to Gould, The Same had previously opened for the band Brezsny sang for at the time, Tao Chemical. Gould also stated in the interview, of her audition for World Entertainment War, "I had never done original songs before. The bass-player and drummer sold me. I never sung a note at my audition and was offered the job." Keyboardist Hannibal left the band shortly and was replaced briefly by Sam Loya, who was then replaced by Amy Excolere.

They began playing live shows and eventually sold out most of their shows in larger clubs in the Santa Cruz and San Francisco bay areas. They recorded their first independent record, an eight-song vinyl album entitled Televisionary, which they recorded at Sonic West Studios in San Jose, California, producing 1000 copies, and released in 1989 on Infomania Records in Santa Cruz. That album climbed to number 15 in the Independent College Radio Charts in 1989.

As they were finishing the first album's recording and continuing to tour, they received a message in Vancouver, British Columbia, from Sandy Pearlman, who had managed Black Sabbath and produced albums for The Clash and Blue Öyster Cult, among others, and who wanted to sign the band. Shortly after that, they played at San Francisco’s Club Kommotion, where they were approached by Pearlman. Pearlman had purchased San Francisco's punk and new wave music label, 415 Records, changed the name of the label to Popular Metaphysics, and formed a co-branding alliance with MCA Records. Al Teller had been president of Columbia Records when the 415 Records partnership began and by 1989 he was president of MCA; making a partnership between Popular Metaphysics and MCA a logical choice. He convinced MCA to sign the band, and vowed to make them famous.

Within a year, a recording contract was forged and with MCA's backing, World Entertainment War recorded their self-titled debut album at Pearlman's Alpha Omega Studios in Studio C of the Hyde Street Studios in San Francisco, as was specified in their MCA contract. Backing vocals were performed by Jonnie Axtell, Atom Ellis, Eugene "Bud" Harris, and Paul K. Johnson, II. Additional background vocals were provided by members of the diverse and loosely-knit team of occultists (Pagans, Druids, Ceremonialists, Goddess worshippers, and Faery-Folk) whose expertise Brezsny had recruited, and among whose often glaring doctrinal differences Brezsny had made peace, resulting in collaborative and highly theatrical rituals that became a signature of the band's iconoclastic live performances. "Imagine instead a pagan revival meeting mixed with a dance therapy session and a cynics' pep rally and a tribal hoedown and a lecture at the "Anarchists Just Wanna Have Fun" Think Tank". Mark Senasac engineered, mixed, and produced, with Ulrich Wild also engineering, and Stephen Marcussen did the mastering. In 1991 the self-titled debut CD was released on Popular Metaphysics, and distributed by MCA Records. Brezsny’s daughter, Zoe, was born on the same day the album was released.

Rock promoter Bill Graham saw the band perform at San Francisco's Paradise Lounge and soon became their manager. According to Brezsny, “He started coming on really strong to us: He told me that he’d never been this excited about a band since 1969...” Graham told the band’s members in no uncertain terms that he was going to make them “the Grateful Dead of the ’90s”. Graham was determined though, and began working with David Geffen to secure opening slots for the band with R.E.M. and Midnight Oil. Their album was nominated for a 1991 "Bammie", the Bay Area Music Award.

In October 1991, however, shortly after their album release, Graham was killed in a helicopter crash while returning home from a Huey Lewis show. Remaining promoters at Bill Graham Presents were unable to properly promote the band and the album languished. Brezsny moved to Marin and Earth moved to San Francisco as the band's enthusiasm drifted to other projects. Excolere quit the band in 1992. Remaining members continued doing live performances as World Entertainment War in a variety of venues until the group disbanded in 1993. Gould had begun singing with Jefferson Starship, after Paul Kantner heard her sing at a World Entertainment War show and recruited her to replace Grace Slick. Brezsny wanted to do more writing and they decided to split. During one of their final performances, on Jan. 8, 1993 at San Francisco's Digital Be-In, one of Brezsny's heroes, Timothy Leary, joined them onstage and sang with the band.

Their third album, Give Too Much, contained some of the same recordings and two other tracks recorded at the same time. Some songs were re-recorded at Norm Kerner's Brilliant Studios in San Francisco. The album was released later by Brezsny, after purchasing back the masters from Pearlman, who had secured half of the publishing rights to their songs under the MCA contract.

== Post-breakup activities ==
Darby Gould would later join Paul Kantner, Papa John Creach, Jack Casady, Prairie Prince and others as lead female vocalist in a variety of lineups including Wooden Ships, Jefferson Starship - The Next Generation, and Jefferson Starship. Excolere would also appear and record as a vocalist with Jefferson Starship - The Next Generation. Jefferson Starship covered the World Entertainment War song "Dark Ages" on their album Deep Space / Virgin Sky, and they also covered "In a Crisis", on their album Jefferson's Tree of Liberty with Gould contributing vocals to both.

George Earth had previously worked with Guess in the Santa Cruz bands, Heaven On and Circus Boy. He would later record and tour with Switchblade Symphony, still later touring with Angel Corpus Christi and Stolen Babies, and he performed, composed, recorded, and produced numerous other artists before forming Los Angeles-based Small Halo in 2008. His most recent work has been focused on scoring music for films and television scripts.

Daniel Lewis had played bass with Brezsny in Tao Chemical. He went on to form Jivehounds with Guess and also composed, recorded and performed as a bassist for numerous other projects, including Pipa & the Shapeshifters, Tranceport, Delta 9, Andrew Robert Nelson and presently, Dreambeach, with cofounder & vocalist, Pipa Piñon, The Joint Chiefs, the Al James Band, and Solcircle.

Anthony Guess had played with George Earth in Heaven On and had been the original percussionist for Camper Van Beethoven. He went on to form Jivehounds with Daniel Lewis and then moved to Seattle, Washington to perform, compose, record, and tour with many other bands and performers, including Calm Down Juanita, and Travis Morrissey & the Good Ship, before forming his current project, Seattle-based I Die Everyday, in 2010.

Rob Brezsny had previously sung in Kamikaze Angel Slander and, with Lewis, in Tao Chemical. He has gone on to publish several books and poetry, and his weekly horoscope column, "Free Will Astrology" – originally "Real Astrology" – runs in around 120 periodicals.

== Reunion ==
In 2000, four of the band's members, Rob Brezsny, George Earth, Daniel Lewis, and Amy Escolere, reunited with two other musicians and played a few shows to celebrate Brezsny’s book tour for The Televisionary Oracle. Earth, Brezsny, and Escolere then joined to play at Burning Man 2001.

World Entertainment War resurfaced again in late 2009; this time with the full 1993 lineup of Earth, Guess, Lewis, Escolere, Brezsny, and Gould. They played a reunion show on Oct. 24, 2009, at 19 Broadway, a Marin County venue in the town of Fairfax, California, which Santa Cruz Good Times newspaper editor Greg Archer pre-announced as, "the most provocative comeback of the season",

== Members ==
- Rob Brezsny (lead vocals)
- Darby Gould (lead vocals)
- George Earth (guitar)
- Anthony Guess (drums)
- Daniel Lewis (bass)
- Amy Excolere (keyboards)

== Discography ==
=== Televisionary (1989) ===
Recorded at Sonic West Studios in San Jose, California; contains eight songs; 1000 copies produced on vinyl, released in 1989 on Infomania Records in Santa Cruz.

==== Track listing ====
- Side 1
1. Marlboro Man, Jr. 4:25
2. Left Hand Fights the Right 4:09
3. Dance Your Monster 4:05
4. Purity Test, Part 1 1:40
5. Televisionary 6:08
- Side 2
1. K-Mart Tribal Ballet 4:42
2. Cooked Intelligence 4:12
3. I Dropped Out of Kindergarten 3:51
4. Purity Test, Part 2 :44
5. Triple Witching Hour 6:58

=== World Entertainment War (1991) ===
Recorded at Alpha Omega Studios, produced, engineered, and mixed by Mark Senesac, engineered by Ulrich Wild, mastered by Stephen Marcussen, and released in Germany on CD (MCD-10137) and album (MCAD10137), by Popular Metaphysics/MCA. Artwork: Cover concept by Richard Stutting & Rob Brezsny; art direction/design & collage by Richard Stutting; photography by Egon; colorization by Hugh Brown. "Magickal weapons" used in live performances, courtesy of "a female faust", were featured in the colorized collage that became the cover.

1. Relax 0:54
2. Dark Ages 3:59
3. Apathy And Ignorance 0:46
4. Get Outta My Head 2:10
5. Telepathics Anonymous 0:42
6. Proud Americans 4:22
7. We Have Ways 4:59
8. Kick Your Own Ass 4:50
9. Prayer 1:30
10. Prayer Wars 4:00
11. Snake Dance 4:32
12. For Your Ears Only 0:26
13. Break The Law 3:04
14. Kick In 3:55
15. Purity Test 0:33
16. Pagan Jake's Dream Girl 3:30
17. Televisionary 5:12
18. Control Yourself 3:00
19. In A Crisis 4:10
20. Mediapocalypse 0:20

=== Give Too Much ===
Released by Brezsny; partially consisting of recordings from the MCA album including two unreleased tracks. The track order is different, and some of the songs have different titles. Some songs were re-recorded at Brilliant Studios in San Francisco.

1. Relax
2. Dark Ages
3. Apathy and Ignorance
4. Pagan Jake's Dream Girl
5. Telepathics Anonymous
6. Marlboro Man Jr.
7. Kick Your Own Ass
8. We Have Ways
9. Garbageland
10. Yaya Gaga
11. Prayer Wars
12. For Your Ears Only
13. Kick In
14. Snake Dance
15. Break the Law
16. Televisionary
17. Purity Test
18. Get Outta My Head
19. Furnace of Nuclear Love
20. In a Crisis
21. Control Yourself
22. Mediapocalypse
