= Darby Gould =

American vocalist (born 1965)

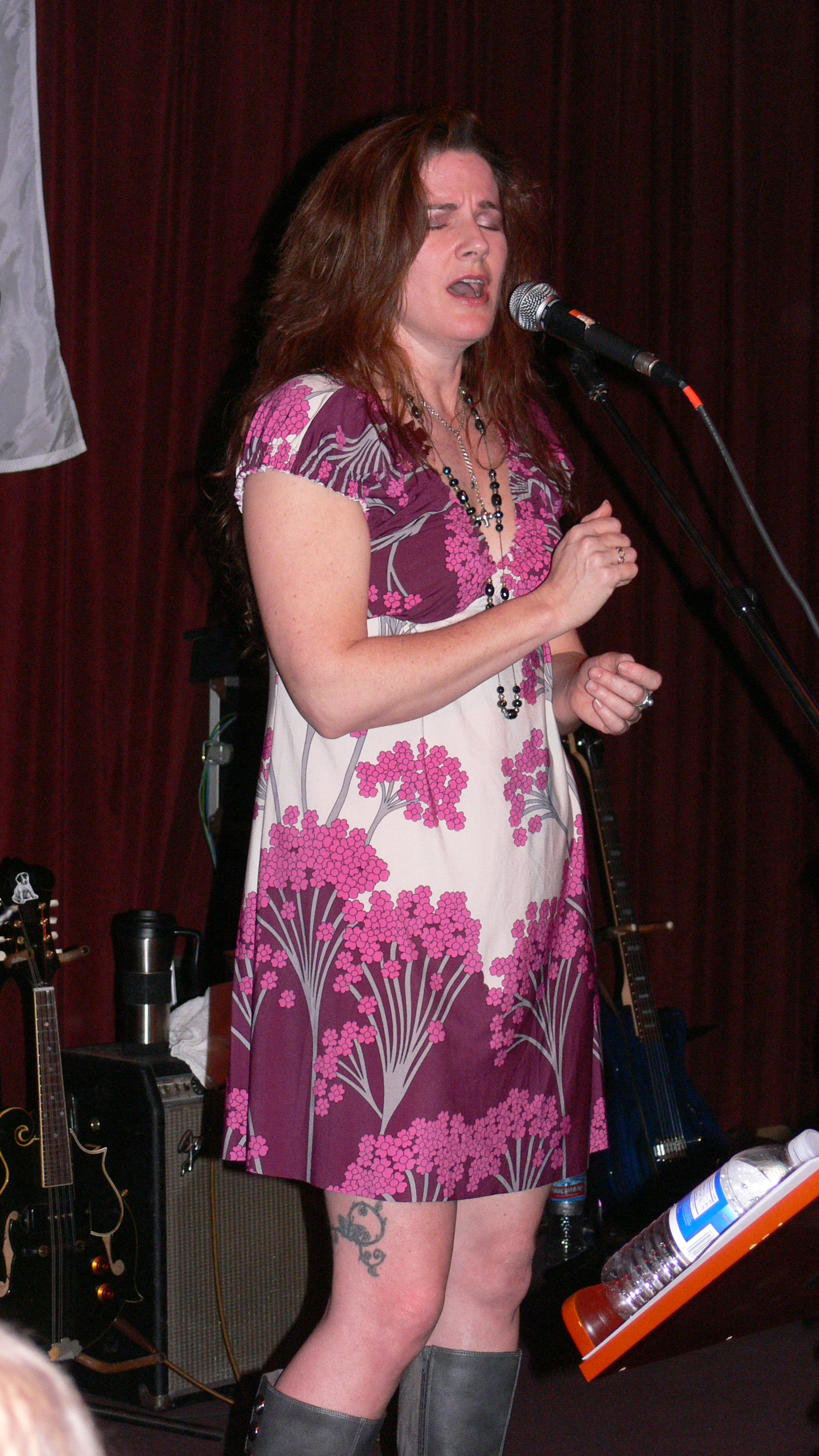
- Darby Gould performing with Jefferson Starship in Sebastopol, California on April 11, 2009.

Background information
- Born: Darby Marie Gould; 1965 (age 60–61)
- Genres: Rock, alternative, folk, soul, blues
- Occupation: Vocalist
- Instruments: Vocals, piano, ukulele
- Years active: 1977–present
- Labels: MCA, CMC International, The Lab

Darby Marie Gould (aka Darby Venegas) is an American vocalist best known for her work with Jefferson Starship and World Entertainment War. Over the years she has developed a loyal following based on her passionate, soulful vocals and intense stage presence.

== Early life ==
The daughter of a minister father and a pianist mother, Darby Gould's first experiences of singing in front of an audience occurred in church. At age 12 she joined her first band, Eclipse, in Tustin, California. In high school she also performed at weddings, musicals and sang the National Anthem at various events. Darby attended the University of California, Santa Cruz, receiving a BA in Music. She received the Chancellor's Award for the performance of her Senior Recital. Throughout her college years, she was a member of various bands, including The Same, Rickardo's Bandoleros and Barbie Berkeley & the Redirects.

== World Entertainment War ==
After college, Darby continued to sing with several bands. In Spring 1987 she joined the newly formed Santa Cruz group, World Entertainment War (WEW), fronted by astrologer Rob Brezsny. WEW built up an enthusiastic following in Santa Cruz and the Bay Area, releasing an independent album, “Televisionary” in 1989 and a self-titled album in 1991 on Popular Metaphysics (formerly 415 Records), distributed by MCA Records. The band was managed by Bill Graham, with Graham developing plans to have WEW tour as an opening act for R.E.M. Graham's untimely death in October 1991 prevented these plans from being realized. Darby began an association with Paul Kantner, appearing first as a guest singer on several dates with Paul Kantner's Wooden Ships and also contributing lead vocals to one track of Kantner's still unfinished album with women vocalists.

== Jefferson Starship – The Next Generation ==
In late 1991 Kantner began plans to convert his Wooden Ships project into a reconstituted version of Jefferson Starship, initially adding on the “Next Generation” moniker (JS-TNG) to differentiate it from the commercialized and controversial version of the band from the 1980s. From Wooden Ships, Kantner brought in lead guitarist Mark “Slick” Aguilar and keyboard player Tim Gorman. Jefferson Airplane and Hot Tuna members Jack Casady on bass and Papa John Creach on violin also signed up, along with Tubes drummer, Prairie Prince. With Grace Slick in retirement, the female vocalist position went to Darby Gould.

JS-TNG made their public debut at Konocti Harbor in California on January 24, 1992, with a song list composed of Jefferson Airplane classics (Darby initially resisted performing “Somebody to Love” and “White Rabbit” out of respect for her predecessor), Jefferson Starship material and songs from Paul Kantner's solo albums. Gould also brought along two songs from World Entertainment War's repertoire, “Dark Ages” and “In a Crisis”. JS-TNG began touring extensively. Concurrently with the launch of JS-TNG, World Entertainment War was winding down and Darby started her own band, Blind Tom, composed of Gould on lead vocals, Tom Venegas and Tim Gilman on guitars, Jim Bailey on drums and Jared Rodgers on bass. Blind Tom's style was centered more on her personal preference for hard rock and heavy metal than the music Gould had performed with bands in the past.

Scheduling difficulties ensued as Darby decided to perform primarily with Blind Tom, and JS-TNG began working with original Jefferson Airplane female vocalist, Signe Toly Anderson, and hiring a previous unknown, Diana Mangano, initially as Gould's substitute. Some of Darby's highlights during this period with JS-TNG included tours of Europe during March 1993 and Japan in 1995. By 1994, Darby was splitting JS-TNG vocal duties with Mangano.

Gould's highest profile show with JS-TNG occurred on January 21, 1995 at the House of Blues in Hollywood, CA. The concert, set up as a fundraiser for the family of Papa John Creach who had passed the previous year, saw the return of Grace Slick to the band, albeit for one show only. Darby sang the lead vocals for the first two hours, contributing what many consider to be the recording highlight of her career, on a version of Nona Hendryx’s “Women Who Fly”, a song Gould had been performing with JS-TNG since early 1992. Slick took over the lead vocals for the next half-hour, with Darby contributing backing vocals (along with Paul and Grace's daughter, China Kantner) to some of the songs. Highlights of that concert were released later that year on the live album, Deep Space/Virgin Sky.

In mid-1995 Diana Mangano permanently took over the female vocalist position in JS-TNG for the next 13 years. Darby continued to focus on Blind Tom and also started an acoustic duo with Tom Venegas, dubbed Goo Bonnet, playing cafes and small venues in the Bay Area. In 1996 she returned to the workforce, deciding to sing only on a part-time basis. During this period she also began appearing as a substitute for the female singers in the Bay Area party band, Big Bang Beat, as well as making occasional appearances with Jefferson Starship and filling in for other local bands.

== Recent activity ==
Balancing parenthood with work and her part-time music career, she still found time to rejoin her old bandmates. After a five-year absence from Jefferson Starship, Darby returned in 2000 on a part-time basis. Gould contributed lead vocals to three tracks on the 2008 Jefferson Starship album, Jefferson's Tree of Liberty. Darby also participated in numerous session work, including Electronic Arts' Sims 2 Nightlife computer game expansion pack. December 2008 saw Gould's debut in the 1960s girl group tribute theatrical performance of The Coverlettes Cover Christmas at the Aurora Theatre in Berkeley, CA. Several critics singled out Darby for her performances. October 2009 saw a reunion concert featuring all six members of World Entertainment War for the first time since 1992. In December 2010, Darby began contributing vocals to a continuing series of recordings under the group name, "Paul Kantner's Windowpane Collective". In 2013 she began appearing with Big Brother and the Holding Company. She also joins instrumental band, Points North, when they perform as their alter ego, Fred Barchetta, stepping in as the lead singer for the Rush tribute band. Along with Big Brother and Fred Barchetta, she currently plays with guitarist Jeff Tamelier in an acoustic duo dubbed Mt. Tam, as well as appearing frequently with Tamelier in supergroup Camp Jeff alongside drummer Jeff Campitelli.

== Selected discography ==
- Televisionary World Entertainment War (1989)
- Psychefunkapus Psychefunkapus (1990)
- World Entertainment War World Entertainment War (1991)
- Troubadours of Folk Various Artists (VHS) (1993)
- Deep Space – Virgin Sky Jefferson Starship (1995)
- Downtown America Dave Sharp (1996)
- Windows of Heaven Jefferson Starship (1998)
- Give Too Much World Entertainment War (2000)
- Deeper Space - Extra Virgin Sky Jefferson Starship (2003)
- Sims 2 Nightlife Expansion Pack (Computer Game) (2005)
- Summer of Love - 40th Anniversary Various Artists (2007)
- Jefferson's Tree of Liberty Jefferson Starship (2008)
- Chet Helms Tribal Stomp Various Artists (2008)
- Windowpane Collective Vol. 1 - A Martian Christmas (2010)
- Windowpane Collective Vol. 2 - Venusian Love Songs (2011)
