= Jefferson Airplane (album) =

Studio album by Jefferson Airplane
- Released: August 22, 1989
- Recorded: 1989
- Studio: The Record Plant, Los Angeles
- Genre: Rock
- Length: 54:33
- Label: Epic
- Producer: Ron Nevison; Greg Edward; Jefferson Airplane

Jefferson Airplane chronology
2400 Fulton Street (1987)	Jefferson Airplane (1989)	Live at the Monterey Festival (1991)

Singles from Jefferson Airplane
- 1. "Summer of Love" Released: August 1989; 2. "Planes" Released: September 1, 1989; 3. "True Love" Released: November 17, 1989

Professional ratings
Review scores
Source	Rating
Allmusic	2.5/5 stars
Classic Rock	3/10 stars
The Encyclopedia of Popular Music	1/5 stars
Rolling Stone	2/5 stars

Jefferson Airplane is the eighth and final studio album by San Francisco rock band Jefferson Airplane, released on Epic Records in 1989. Marty Balin, Paul Kantner, Grace Slick, Jorma Kaukonen and Jack Casady all returned for the album and supporting tour, though Spencer Dryden did not participate. The album and accompanying tour would mark the last time Jefferson Airplane would perform together until their 1996 induction to the Rock and Roll Hall of Fame.

== Overview ==
Paul Kantner, Marty Balin, and Jack Casady had toured as the KBC Band and released an eponymous album in 1986. Grace Slick had recently left Starship after performing lead vocals on their album No Protection in 1987, and planned to retire from music. Jorma Kaukonen had been performing solo work and performing live with Jack Casady as Hot Tuna. Kantner left KBC Band in 1987 but joined Hot Tuna on stage for the 1987–1988 tour. Kaukonen invited Slick to play a concert at the Fillmore with Hot Tuna in 1988 where she performed harmony vocals on "Third Week in the Chelsea" and lead vocals along with Kantner for "Wooden Ships". In 1989, Slick was convinced to join the band again and the five members finally got together to discuss a reunion tour and album. Joining Jefferson Airplane for the tour along with Kenny Aronoff on drums were Tim Gorman – who had played with KBC Band – on keyboards, Randy Jackson on guitar, and Jorma's brother Peter Kaukonen also on guitar. Gorman and Jackson did not participate on the album. Aronoff joined the band as drummer for the tour and in the studio. The album was produced by Ron Nevison, who had previously produced the Jefferson Starship albums Freedom at Point Zero, Modern Times and Nuclear Furniture, as well as Slick's solo album Software. Kaukonen was displeased with Kantner and Slick's methods in the studio; "Their approach to recording was not the way we used to do it in the old days. It was very much the modular, sequenced LA way of recording. It works for some people but not me. It just wasn't even fun. It was well done but not very passionate."

The first music video made to promote the album was for the Kantner-penned "Planes". The video helped the single rise to #24 on the Billboard charts for mainstream rock, although the album itself only rose to #85 on the Billboard 200. "Planes" and Balin's song "Summer of Love" were both previously performed live by KBC Band, and the first studio versions of these songs were made for this album. The latter song did not have a music video but rose to #15 on the adult contemporary charts. Steve Porcaro and David Paich of Toto wrote the final single, "True Love", and also appeared on the song along with bandmate Mike Porcaro. The music video for "True Love" saw less airtime than the video for "Planes". The Kaukonen compositions "Ice Age" and "Too Many Years" had previously been recorded in acoustic versions for the Kaukonen solo album Too Hot to Handle, and received a multi-instrumental treatment here. Kaukonen wrote one more song for the album, the instrumental "Upfront Blues." At least two songs were written but rejected for the album: Balin's "Let's Go" and Slick's "Harbor in Hong Kong".

After the album was released, Hot Tuna signed to Epic and released Pair a Dice Found—their first studio album in fourteen years.

== Track listing ==
Jefferson Airplane track listing
No.	Title	Writer(s)	Length
1.	"Planes (Experimental Aircraft)"	Paul Kantner	4:26
2.	"Freedom"	Grace Slick	4:54
3.	"Solidarity" (translated by John Willett)	Bertolt Brecht, Marty Balin, Mark Cummings	5:08
4.	"Madeleine Street"	Kantner, Balin	4:15
5.	"Ice Age"	Jorma Kaukonen	4:16
6.	"Summer of Love"	Balin	4:15
7.	"The Wheel (For Nora and Nicaragua)" (translated by Margaret Randall)	Kantner, additional lyrics by Otto René Castillo (Note: borrowed with permission from the poem "For the Good of All")	6:08
8.	"Common Market Madrigal"	Slick	2:46
9.	"True Love"	Steve Porcaro, David Paich	3:43
10.	"Upfront Blues"	Kaukonen	2:02
11.	"Now Is the Time"	Slick	4:53
12.	"Too Many Years"	Kaukonen	4:10
13.	"Panda"	Slick	3:37

== Personnel ==
Jefferson Airplane

- Grace Slick – vocals, keyboards
- Paul Kantner – vocals, guitars
- Marty Balin – vocals
- Jack Casady – bass
- Jorma Kaukonen – vocals, guitars

Additional personnel

- Kenny Aronoff – drums, percussion
- David Paich – keyboards
- Michael Landau – guitars
- Nicky Hopkins – keyboards
- Flo & Eddie – background vocals
- Charles Judge – keyboards
- Efrain Toro – percussion
- Peter Kaukonen – guitars
- Mike Porcaro – bass
- Steve Porcaro – keyboard programming

Production

- Ron Nevison – producer, engineer, mixer
- Greg Edward – producer, engineer, mixer
- Jefferson Airplane – producer
- Recorded at The Record Plant, Los Angeles
- Jim Mitchell & Rumbo Recorders, Los Angeles – assistant engineer
- Gina Immel – assistant engineer
- Mixed at Can-Am Recorders, Los Angeles
- Toby Wright – assistant mixer
- Trudy Green – management
- Lynda Lou Bouch – production coordinator
- Paul Jamieson – drum technician
- Don Barlow – guitar technician
- Billy Goodman – equipment manager/tour
- John Danaher – keyboard technician/tour
- Pre-Production: The Power Plant
- Carl Studna – photography

== Charts ==
Chart (1989)	Peak position
US Billboard 200	85

== Singles ==
- "Summer of Love" (1989) (single only, no video)
- "Planes" (1989)
- "True Love" (1989)
