= KBC Band =

US musical group (1985–1987)

- Origin: San Francisco, California, United States
- Genre: Rock
- Years active: 1985–1987
- Spinoff of: Jefferson Airplane; Jefferson Starship
- Past members: Slick Aguilar; Marty Balin; Jack Casady; Keith Crossnan; Tim Gorman; Paul Kantner; Darrell Verdusco

KBC Band (also sometimes referred to as The Kantner Balin Casady Band) was formed in 1985 by former Jefferson Airplane (later Jefferson Starship) members Paul Kantner (guitar and vocals), Marty Balin (vocals and guitar) and Jack Casady (bass). Other members included Keith Crossnan (saxophone, guitar and vocals), Tim Gorman (keyboards and vocals), Slick Aguilar (guitar and vocals) and Darrell Verdusco (drums). Their sole LP, KBC Band, featured the singles "America" and "It's Not You, It's Not Me."

The band performed supporting tours from 1985 to 1987 before Kantner left for Nicaragua to investigate the Sandinista situation. The band did not perform after his return. Kantner said that Balin was becoming "difficult" near the end of KBC's existence. However, Kantner and Casady continued to perform onstage together during Hot Tuna concerts in late 1987 and early 1988, and the three reunited with Grace Slick and Jorma Kaukonen for a Jefferson Airplane reunion album and a reunion tour in 1989, along with Tim Gorman on keyboards for the tour. The album included three songs that had been performed by KBC Band: "Planes", "Solidarity" and "Summer of Love". They had also performed "Let's Go", which was considered for but rejected from that album.

In 1992, Kantner, Casady, Aguilar, and Gorman reformed Jefferson Starship. Balin would also eventually rejoin them in 1993. All members of KBC Band except for Verdusco and Crossnan participated in the recording of Deep Space/Virgin Sky and Windows of Heaven. Verdusco has been a member of Starship featuring Mickey Thomas since 1995.

== Personnel ==
- Slick Aguilar - lead guitar, backing vocals
- Marty Balin - lead and backing vocals, rhythm guitar (died 2018)
- Jack Casady - bass
- Keith Crossan - saxophone, rhythm guitar, backing vocals
- Tim Gorman - keyboards, backing vocals (died 2025)
- Paul Kantner - rhythm guitar, lead and backing vocals (died 2016)
- Darrell Verdusco - drums, backing vocals
