= Antero Alli =

Finnish astrologer (1952–2023)

- Born: Arto Antero Alexander Alli; 11 November 1952; Helsinki, Finland
- Died: 9 November 2023 (aged 70); Portland, Oregon, U.S.
- Occupations: Astrologer, filmmaker, theatre director, writer

Arto Antero Alexander Alli (11 November 1952 – 9 November 2023) was a Finnish astrologer, filmmaker, theatre director, and writer. He wrote esoteric books on experimental theatre, astrology and Timothy Leary's 8-circuit model of consciousness. He lived in Portland, Oregon, where he conducted workshops and staged paratheatrical productions, some of which have been released as video documents.

== Early life and education ==
He was born in Helsinki, Finland, where he maintained citizenship.

== Film and theatrical work ==
Alli called his work in experimental theatre paratheatre, a term borrowed from the writings of Jerzy Grotowski. He conducted private paratheatrical workshops in the San Francisco Bay Area (1977–1983 and 1996–2015), some of which evolved into public productions and provided the material for his films. In late 2015, he relocated to Portland to continue his work.

Between 1976 and 1999, Alli wrote and directed a series of plays exploring mystical themes: Circles (1976), Coronation at Stillnight (1977), The Conjunction (1978), Chapel Perilous (1983), Animamundi (1989), and Hungry Ghosts of Albion (1999). Between 1992 and 2002, Alli co-curated the Nomad Film Festival, a Pacific coast touring venue featuring short experimental films and videos. After 1993, he focused on underground feature-length art films with mystical themes, such as The Oracle (1993), The Drivetime (1995), Tragos (2001), Hysteria (2002), Under a Shipwrecked Moon (2003), and The Greater Circulation (2005), a cinematic treatment of Rainer Maria Rilke's Requiem for a Friend. In 2015, he stopped making feature films to return full-time to creating intermedia ritual-based theatre works such as Turbulence of Muses (2016), Bardoville (2017), Soror Mystica (2017), Fallen Monsters (2018), and Escape from Chapel Perilous (2018). Over the next four years, he returned to cinema with three features, The Vanishing Field (2020), The Alchemy of Sulphur, and Tracer (2022).

== Writing ==
Alli's books span a number of subjects, but all share common themes with his paratheatrical efforts: archetypes, personal mythology and the use of ritual to transform consciousness. Like his colleague Rob Brezsny, Alli proposes a free will approach to astrology, which provides clients with information to make decisions rather than deterministic predictions; in his introduction to Astrologik, Brezsny calls Alli's approach "a rowdy and iridescent system of astrology that liberates and never ensnares." In Towards an Archaeology of the Soul (2003) and State of Emergence (2020), Alli presents detailed accounts of the theories, methods, and processes of an original Paratheatre medium he has been developing since 1977. These books include his notes on how these methods can be applied to live performance.

From 1991 to 1995, Alli was editor/publisher of Talking Raven Quarterly, a Seattle-based literary journal featuring the writings of Robert Anton Wilson, Hakim Bey, and Brezsny, among others.

In 2006, Alli taught a course on his book AngelTech at Robert Anton Wilson's Maybe Logic Academy.

== Books ==
- Alli, Antero (1987). AngelTech. New Falcon. ISBN 1-56184-009-2
- Alli, Antero (1988). All Rites Reversed: Ritual Technology for Self-Initiation. New Falcon. ISBN 0-941404-81-1
- Alli, Antero (1988). The Akashic Record Player: A Non-Stop Geomantic Conspiracy. New Falcon. ISBN 0-941404-91-9
- Alli, Antero (1990). Astrologik. Vigilantero Press. ISBN 0-9616829-1-4
- Alli, Antero (1993). Letters, Essays and Premonitions. Vigilantero Press/Vertical Pool.
- Alli, Antero and Sylvie Pickering (1996). The Vertical Oracle. Vertical Pool. ISBN 0-9657341-0-2
- Alli, Antero (2003). Towards an Archeology of the Soul. Vertical Pool. ISBN 0-9657341-2-9
- Hyatt, Christopher S. and Antero Alli (1988 then 2006). A Modern Shaman's Guide to a Pregnant Universe. New Falcon. ISBN 1-56184-241-9
- Alli, Antero (2009). The Eight-Circuit Brain: Navigational Strategies for the Energetic Body. Vertical Pool. ISBN 978-0-9657341-3-4
- Alli, Antero (2020). "State of Emergence: Experiments in Group Ritual Dynamics". The Original Falcon Press. ISBN 978-1-935150-71-8
- Alli, Antero (2022). "Experiential Astrology: From the Map to the Territory". The Original Falcon Press. ISBN 978-1-61869-715-8
- Alli, Antero (2023). "Last Words: Towards an Insurrection of the Poetic Imagination". The Original Falcon Press. ISBN 1-61869-973-3
- Alli, Antero (2023). "Sacred Rites: Journal Entries of a Gnostic Heretic". The Original Falcon Press. ISBN 1-61869-954-7

== Filmography ==
- Requiem for a Friend (1991; 40 min)
- Archaic Community (1992; 80 min), a paratheatre video document
- The Drivetime (1995; 88 min)
- The Oracle (1993; 70 min)
- Lily in Limbo (1996; 27 min)
- Tragos: A Cyber-Noir Witch Hunt (2000; 105 min)
- Roadkill (2001; 27 min)
- Hysteria (2002; 83 min)
- Under a Shipwrecked Moon (2003; 96 min)
- Orphans of Delirium (2004; 82 min), a paratheatre video document
- The Greater Circulation (2005; 93 min)
- The Mind Is a Liar and a Whore (2007; 92 min)
- The Invisible Forest (2008; 111 min.)
- To Dream of Falling Upwards (2011–2021; 120 min)
- Flamingos (2012; 90 min)
- dreambody/earthbody (2012; 80 min), a paratheatre video document
- The Book of Jane (2013; 117 min)
- Out of the Woods (2015–2021; 87 min)
- The Vanishing Field (2020; 72 min)
- The Alchemy of Sulphur (2021; 109 min)
- Tracer (2022; 93 min)
- The Celebrants (2023; 32 min)
- Blue Fire (2023; 90 min)

== See also ==
- Eight-circuit model of consciousness
- Experimental theatre
- Western astrology
