= Daniel Vee Lewis =

American musician and bass player (born 1959)

- Also known as: Daniel Lewis
- Born: July 15, 1959
- Genres: Rock, alternative rock
- Occupation(s): Musician, songwriter
- Instrument: Bass
- Years active: 1971–present
- Website: dreambeach.net/pipa_daniel.htm

Daniel Vee Lewis (born July 15, 1959) is an American musician and bass player, perhaps best known as the bassist for the Santa Cruz, California-based group World Entertainment War. His current projects include Dreambeach, with cofounder & vocalist, Pipa Piñon, and performance work with Solcircle, The Joint Chiefs, and The Al James Band.

== Biography ==
Daniel Vee Lewis was born on July 15, 1959, in Salt Lake City, Utah. He was raised in Los Angeles and later moved to Santa Cruz, California. He started playing drums in rock bands at 12 years old and took some formal training on drums before he switched to the bass guitar, which he taught himself to play well by the age of 16. He finished high school in Santa Cruz, California and then enrolled in jazz improvisation courses at Cabrillo College, where one of his instructors was trumpet player Ray Brown of the Stan Kenten Band.

Lewis played in Tao Chemical with Rob Brezsny.

From 1988 until their disbandment in 1993, he was the bass guitarist for World Entertainment War, playing with vocalists Rob Brezsny and Darby Gould, drummer Anthony Guess, and keyboardist Amy Excolere on two albums, one on MCA Records. Bill Graham, World Entertainment War's manager, once said of Lewis, backstage at one of their shows, "I love your bass style. You've got that animal/juju thing going on."

He and Guess went on after that to play old-school funk and disco music in Jivehounds, another Santa Cruz-based band that also featured vocalist Dante Dark.

He currently plays bass guitar for the Santa Cruz-based band Solcircle, which he helped form in the early 1980s, then as Special Fun, and which currently consists also of wind instrumentalist Gary Regina, percussionists Michael Horne and Gary Kehoe, and guitarist and videographer Bob von Elgg. Solcircle released a self-titled CD album on August 31, 2002 on Audio Amigos Records. Adam Cotton of the Metro Santa Cruz newspaper called them, "One of the most visionary bands in the history of the Santa Cruz music scene."

Since 2003, Lewis has also played bass guitar for The Joint Chiefs, a funk, acid jazz and classic rhythm & blues band that started in 1990 and plays regularly in the Northern California and San Francisco Bay areas. The Joint Chiefs consists of Lewis with bandleader, composer, and guitarist Don Caruth, saxophonist Bob Biala, and drummer Don Thomas.

Other fruitful collaborations during his thirty-plus-year musical career have included Free Wheelin', Unknown Jeromes, Aligator and his Zydeco Swamp Band, Tranceport, Tao Chemical, Mic Overman and the Maniacs, Johnny Fabulous, Delta 9, Ariel Thierman, Cosmic Flash, Laura Valatis, Greg Chansky, and Soulbabies.
