= Drive time (disambiguation) =

Drive time, in broadcasting, is a part of the day in which many drivers are listening to radio.

Drive time may also refer to:

- DriveTime, a used car seller and automobile finance company
- The Drivetime, a 1995 science fiction film
- "Drive Time", a 1993 song by Lisa Stewart
