= Love Club (disambiguation) =

Love Club was an American goth band.

Love Club may also refer to:

- The Love Club EP, a 2013 extended play by Lorde, or the title track
- "Love Club", a song by Big Bang from Big Bang (2009 album)
