= Slick Aguilar =

American guitarist (born 1954)

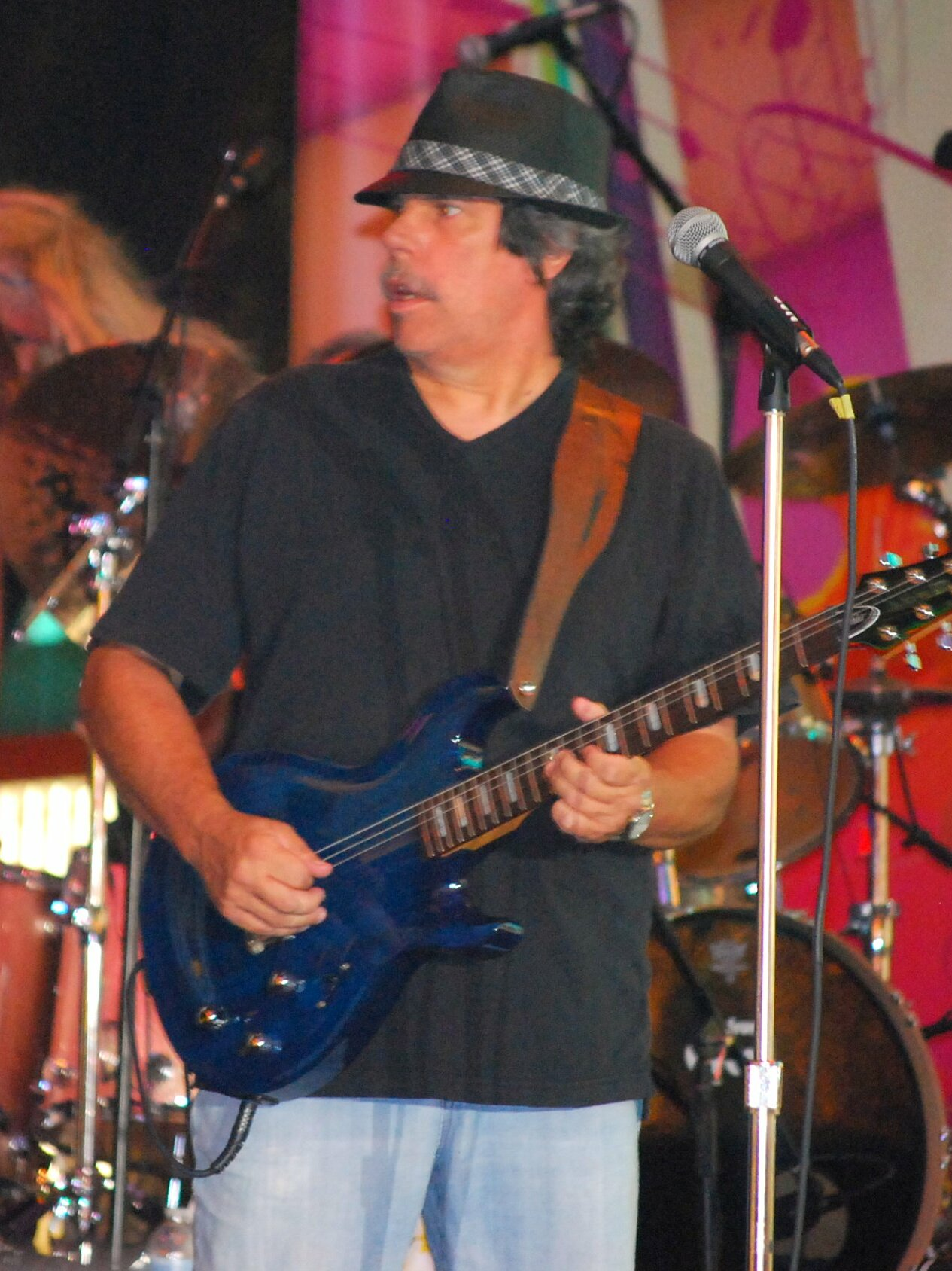
- Aguilar performing with Jefferson Starship in 2010

Background information
- Born: Mark Aguilar; 1954 (age 71–72); Fort Campbell, Kentucky, U.S.
- Genres: Rock
- Instrument: Guitar
- Years active: 1970s–present
- Formerly of: KBC Band

Mark "Slick" Aguilar (born 1954) is an American guitarist. He has worked with a number of notable musicians but is probably best known as a member of Jefferson Starship. From 1974 to 1980 he was an in house guitar player for TK studios in N. Miami. He recorded with KC & the Sunshine Band, Bobby Caldwell, Latimore, George & Gwen McCrae, Clarence Reid, Timmy Thomas and Betty Wright. He played guitar with KC & the Sunshine Band and Wayne Cochran during the late 1970s before moving to the West Coast. It was there that he recorded with, Buddy Miles' band and in 1982-84 he toured with David Crosby. In 1984 Slick joined Marty Balin's band which led to him being hired to play lead guitar in the KBC Band.

When Paul Kantner reformed Jefferson Starship in 1992 he hired Slick as the band's lead guitarist, a position that lead to musical director that he held until 2012. He also sometimes performed with Marty Balin as a duo.

In 2016 Slick formed the Airplane Family including Joli Valenti (son of Dino Valenti, Quick Silver Gold), Michael Falzarano (Hot Tuna, New Riders of the Purple Sage), Prairie Prince (co-founder of the Tubes, Todd Rundgren, Jefferson Starship), Peter Kaukonen (Jefferson Airplane, Jefferson Starship, Hot Tuna), Darby Slick (The Great Society, Composer of Somebody to Love), Darby Gould Venegas (Jefferson Starship). Also formed in 2016 the Live/Dead69 Band with the original keyboard player from the Grateful Dead in 1967-70 Tom Constanten, Mark Karan (Rat Dog, Dave Mason, Furthur, Phil and Friends), Robin Sylvester (Rat Dog, Marty Balin Band), Prairie Prince or Joe Chirco (Zen Tricksters). As of 2022, his son Mark Aguilar joined The Airplane Family. The two have collaborated over the years on many different occasions and are currently out as the Aguilar Family Band.

== Discography ==
with PAX band (Peru)

- May god and your will land you and your soul miles away from evil (Sono Radio 1972)

with KBC Band

- KBC Band (1986)

with Jefferson Starship

- Deep Space / Virgin Sky (1995)
- Windows of Heaven (1999)
- Across the Sea of Suns (2001)
- Jefferson's Tree of Liberty (2008)
