= The Drivetime =

- Publicity still
- Directed by: Antero Alli
- Written by: Antero Alli; Rob Brezsny (add'l text)
- Produced by: Antero Alli
- Starring: Michael Douglas; Michael George; Susan Mansfield; Kristen Kosmas,
- Cinematography: Antero Alli
- Edited by: Antero Alli; John Comerford
- Distributed by: ParaTheatrical ReSearch112905
- Release date: August 30, 1995
- Running time: 88 minutes
- Country: United States
- Language: English
- Budget: US$5,000

The Drivetime is a 1995 science fiction film directed, written, and produced by the Finnish-American filmmaker Antero Alli.

== Plot ==
The film opens in the year 2023 in the Nostradamus Islands. A librarian named Flux recalls a series of earthquakes that destroyed the continental United States. A totalitarian government took control of the United States following the disaster, but video footage from the pre-earthquake world was lost. The government sends Flux back in time to the Seattle, Washington, of 1999, to locate video footage of a riot that took place prior to the earthquake. He arrives in a society where telecommunications technology has replaced human interactions and where police operations are presented as television entertainment. He also discovers the government is putting forth footage of non-existent riots as a means of establishing law and order.

== Production ==
The Drivetime was produced on a budget of US$5,000 (currently $11,000). Rob Brezsny, author of the syndicated newspaper column "Real Astrology", wrote the text for the film's psychedelic infomercials.

Alli shot The Drivetime in five different video formats—BETA SP, HI-8, VHS, C-VHS, SVHS—and in Super 8 film. The riot footage was culled from the September 10, 1994, riots in Seattle's Capitol Hill neighborhood that protested alleged police brutality.

== Release ==
The Drivetime was first screened at the Velvet Elvis Arts Theater in Seattle in August 1995. The film had a limited theatrical release and was later distributed on DVD.

The Drivetime received mixed reviews. Phil Hall praised it in Wired as "one of the most chilling yet innovative cinematic essays on the flaws of today's technology-obsessed society" while Steven Seid of the Pacific Film Archive praised the film's "provocative visuals" and noted it was "at its best when plying its 'televisionary' speculations about a spiritual resurgence that will overwhelm virtuality." However, Robert Firsching, writing for the Amazing World of Cult Movies, dismissed The Drivetime as a “silly mess".
