= Love Club =

- Origin: U.S.
- Genre: Gothic rock
- Years active: 1987-1992
- Label: MCA Records
- Members: Deborah Borchers; Lawrence Doyle
- Past members: Lawrence Doyle; Craig Spitzer; Randy Gzebb; Jeff St. Pierre; John Scampoli; Trey Long; John Distefano

Love Club was a San Francisco-based American gothic rock band of the 1980s and 1990s, founded and fronted by vocalist and pianist Deborah Borchers, with guitarist Lawrence (Larry) Doyle. They were one of the few bands signed by Sandy Pearlman to his Popular Metaphysics label. Under that label's co-branding contract with MCA Records, Love Club released one nine-song album, "Lime Twigs and Treachery", in 1990.

== History ==
Borchers started singing at seven years old and started Love Club with Larry Doyle in the 1980s. Their style of music is a goth-influenced alternative trance funk. One of the earliest lineups of the band 87-89 included Larry Doyle, Deborah Borchers, Jeff St. Pierre and John Scampoli, the musicians involved in recording "Lime Twigs and Treachery". While the album did not enjoy much commercial success, Paul Nash of Trouser Press called Borchers a "skilled diva" and compared her vocals with those of Danielle Dax and Nina Hagen. Alex Henderson of All Music Guide said of the band, "As much as Love Club thrives on dissonance, the band also has a fine melodic sense," and of Borchers that she, "sometimes brings to mind Tori Amos, but Club tends to be more aggressive, as well as more accessible."

At one point, the band also included bassist Craig Spitzer, and drummer Randy Gzebb. At the time of one of their press kits for Popular Metaphysics, a later lineup of the band was featured, which was in place from 1989 to 1992, consisting of Borchers and Doyle with bassist Trey Long and percussionist and musicologist John Distefano. That lineup was featured on 'Screaming Echos'.

== Post-dissolution activities ==
Borchers' vocals were featured on one song, Arabia Avalon, on the 1994 Frank Rothkamm CD album, "Frank Genius Presents Planet Genius", released in the U.S. by Flux Records (FLX1)

Borcher began to write again in 1999 after a long hiatus, with guitarist and synthesist Greg Reed (co-writer on "Once Upon a Time" and with her vocals, melody and harmonies, for a project entitled "The Nature of Desire".

Borchers was later featured on the Moda song, Enchanted Breaks, included on the CD album, "Future House" (various artists), released Aug 22, 2005 in the UK on Kickin' Records (KICK CD 142)

== Members ==
- Deborah Borchers
- Lawrence Doyle
- Craig Spitzer
- Randy Gzebb
- Jeff St. Pierre
- John Scampoli
- Trey Long
- John Distefano

== Discography ==
Lime Twigs and Treachery (1990)

Recorded at, mastered by Stephen Marcussen, produced by Bill Buchanan, and released in the US on Aug. 17, 1990 on the Popular Metaphysics/MCA Records label. (MCAD-10034)

Track Listing:

- 1. "One Last Kiss" (3:34)
- 2. "Corpses In The Sand" (4:35)
- 3. "Holding Heaven's Hand" (4:44)
- 4. "The Mirror" (10:00)
- 5. "Killing Ground" (4:08)
- 6. "Sad Eyes" (3:06)
- 7. "Distant" (4:26)
- 8. "Eternity" (3:52)
- 9. "The Thief" (4:44)

Bass: Craig Spitzer; Drums: Bryan Mantia, Randy Gzebb; Guitar: Lawrence Doyle; Producer, Keyboards (Additional): Jackson Gilder; Tin Whistle (Penny), Goblet Drum (Darbukka), Tar (lute): Bill Buchanan; Violin: David Balakrishnan; Vocals, Piano: Deborah Borchers

Screaming Echos (Live)

Track Listing:

Love Club Live: The Last Years

Track Listing: ?. "Cry to the Ocean"

Solo

"Duenna Muse" with Greg Reed.
