= Serpentine Gallery (album) =

Studio album by Switchblade Symphony
- Released: September 11, 1995
- Recorded: 1991–May 1995
- Studios: DCP Studio, Guru Studio
- Genre: Gothic rock
- Length: 46:44
- Label: Cleopatra Records
- Producers: Switchblade Symphony, George Stone

Switchblade Symphony chronology
Serpentine Gallery (1995)	Scrapbook (1997)

Professional ratings
Review scores
Source	Rating
AllMusic	3/5 stars

Serpentine Gallery is the debut studio album by Switchblade Symphony. A deluxe edition with a bonus disc was released in 2005.

== Track listing ==
1. "Bad Trash" – 3:42
2. "Dissolve" – 4:31
3. "Wallflower" – 4:58
4. "Wrecking Yard" – 5:09
5. "Clown" – 5:35
6. "Cocoon" – 2:07
7. "Dollhouse" – 4:06
8. "Sweet" – 5:43
9. "Gutter Glitter" – 3:48
10. "Mine Eyes" – 4:24
11. "Bloody Knuckles" – 2:41

=== 2005 re-release bonus disc ===
1. "Waiting Room"
2. "Chain"
3. "Rain"
4. "Numb"
5. "Ride"
6. "Novocaine"
7. "Wrecking Yard"
8. "Sweet" (Burning Mix)
9. "Blue"
10. Live 105 Radio Interview
11. "Clown" music video

== Reception ==
Mark Jenkins reviewed the album for the Washington Post.
