= Tre Lux =

Musical project of Tina Root

Tre Lux (also known as Tré Lux) is the solo trip hop project of Tina Root, the vocalist of Switchblade Symphony.

== A Strange Gathering ==
Her first full-length album, A Strange Gathering, was released September 19, 2006. It is composed of cover songs.

1. "Never Let Me Down Again" – Depeche Mode cover – 4:24
2. "Come Away with Me" – Norah Jones cover – 5:20
3. "Wild Horses" – The Rolling Stones cover – 3:06
4. "Yellow" – Coldplay cover – 4:43
5. "The Chauffeur" – Duran Duran cover – 4:13
6. "I Know There's Something Going On" – Anni-Frid Lyngstad (a.k.a. Frida) cover – 4:42
7. "What's On Your Mind (Pure Energy)" – Information Society cover – 3:49
8. "Black Hole Sun" – Soundgarden cover – 4:42
9. "Karma Police" – Radiohead cover – 3:55
10. "(Every Day Is) Halloween" – Ministry cover – 4:17
11. "Run" – Snow Patrol cover – 6:02
12. "Bad Trash" – Switchblade Symphony cover – 4:31

== Website/MySpace Downloads ==
The following songs were released on TreLux.com or the project's MySpace page in the early-mid 2000's.

1. "Frosty" – A cover of "Frosty the Snowman"
2. "Movement"
3. "South Side" – Moby cover – 4:03 (This song was also later released on a Moby tribute album titled Replay: A Tribute to Moby.)
4. "Stop"
