= Popular Metaphysics =

American record label

- Founded: 1989
- Founder: Sandy Pearlman
- Status: Inactive
- Distributor(s): MCA
- Genre: gothic Post-punk funk rock
- Country of origin: United States
- Location: San Francisco, California

Popular Metaphysics was a record label created by Sandy Pearlman in Studio C of the Hyde Street Studios in San Francisco in 1989. The label was short lived, but it signed a few solid acts and released their records on the MCA label, including Love Club (1990), Manitoba's Wild Kingdom (1990), and World Entertainment War (1991).

== History ==
In 1986, Sandy Pearlman leased Studio C in San Francisco's Hyde Street Studios from studio owner Dan Alexander. Pearlman ran Studio C as Alpha & Omega Studio until 1991. He also used it for his own projects, including those on his short-lived MCA-distributed label Popular Metaphysics, and he also sub-leased it to other producers and artists.

Howie Klein was the owner and President of 415 Records and he had been named general manager of Reprise Records in 1989; later, in 1995, he would become president of Reprise Records and executive vice president of Warner Bros. Records, a position he held until his retirement in 2001. Sandy Pearlman took over as President of 415 Records when Klein left and A&R Director Daniel Levitin stayed to help run the label. Levitin had held that position with 415 Records when Columbia Records severed their co-branding contract earlier in 1989. By this time, Al Teller, who had been president of Columbia when the 415 partnership began, was now president of MCA Records and so, Pearlman formed a new co-branding alliance between 415 Records and MCA. Three months after Klein left, in 1989, Pearlman bought 415 Records and named Tom Schedler head of his A&R department. Shortly after, Pearlman changed the label's name to Popular Metaphysics, ending the 415 Label.

In 1990, Mark Garvey's Songwriters' Market published a listing that read as follows: "*SANDY PEARLMAN, INC., 245 Hyde St., San Francisco CA 94102. (415)885-4999. A&R Director: Natasha V. Record producer, record company (Popular Metaphysics, formerly 415), recording studio (Alpha & Omega Recording, Hyde Street Studios)."

Popular Metaphysics signed and released records through its co-branding agreement with MCA for a diverse but small group of artists, including Love Club, Manitoba's Wild Kingdom, and World Entertainment War. Not every artist that Popular Metaphysics courted was co-branded by MCA. In the summer of 1990, Salt Lake City, Utah alternative band Idaho Syndrome, did a showcase for a label representative, and expected to be signed, contingent on MCA's final approval. As lead singer Ryley Fogg described it two years later, "They didn't like dirge rock," and the deal fell through.

== Artists signed to Popular Metaphysics ==
Popular Metaphysics signed artists included:

- Love Club
- Manitoba's Wild Kingdom
- World Entertainment War

== Discography ==
- Love Club

Lime Twigs and Treachery (1990)

Recorded at, engineered by, mastered by Stephen Marcussen, produced by Bill Buchanan, and released as a CD in the US (cat# MCAD-10034) on Jan 1, 1990 on the Popular Metaphysics/MCA Records label.

- Manitoba's Wild Kingdom

...And You? (1990)

Recorded at, engineered by, with Ulrich Wild assisting, mastered by, produced by Andy Shernoff and released in Germany as a vinyl LP album (cat.# 2292-57200-1), in the UK as a cassette tape album (cat.# MCGC 6087), and in the US as a CD album (cat# MCAD 6367) and cassette (cat# 6367), on Popular Metaphysics, co-branded with MCA.

- World Entertainment War

World Entertainment War (1991)

Recorded at Alpha Omega Studios, engineered by Ulrich Wild and Mark Senasac, produced and mixed by Mark Senasac, mastered by Stephen Marcussen, and released in the US and Germany on CD (cat# MCD-10137), cassette, (cat# 10137) and album (cat# MCAD10137), by Popular Metaphysics/MCA.
