= KBC Band (album) =

Studio album by KBC Band
- Released: October 9, 1986
- Recorded: 1986 at The Plant, Sausalito and Fantasy Studios, Berkeley
- Genre: New wave, pop rock, hard rock
- Length: 41:11
- Label: Arista
- Producer: KBC Band; Jim Gaines; John Boylan

Professional ratings
Review scores
Source	Rating
AllMusic	3.5/5 stars

KBC Band is KBC Band's only album, featuring Paul Kantner, Marty Balin, and Jack Casady from Jefferson Airplane.

The single "It's Not You, It's Not Me" was released shortly before the album's release, the second single was "America".

When originally released, the album cover was printed on both the outside and inside. In one vinyl release, the inside jacket of the album had a picture of a road with a car traveling on it with sign in the distance that said: "Life is a test. Had this been a real life, you would have been told where to go and what to do" — a satire of the message broadcast by the Emergency Broadcast System.

Outtakes were included on the Marty Balin albums Balince and Nothin' 2 Lose: The Lost Studio Recordings.

== Track listing ==
Side one
No.	Title	Writer(s)	Length
1.	"Mariel"	Paul Kantner; Marty Balin	4:30
2.	"It's Not You, It's Not Me"	Van Stephenson; Phil Brown	3:33
3.	"Hold Me"	David Evan; Gene Heart	6:30
4.	"America"	Kantner; Balin	6:18

Side two
No.	Title	Writer(s)	Length
1.	"No More Heartaches"	Cary Sharaf	3:30
2.	"Wrecking Crew"	Mark "Slick" Aguilar; Tim Gorman	3:42
3.	"When Love Comes"	Heart; Evan	4:22
4.	"Dream Motorcycle"	Kantner; Balin	3:47
5.	"Sayonara"	Kazumasa Oda	4:59
Total length:			41:11

== Personnel ==
KBC Band

- Paul Kantner – vocals, rhythm guitar
- Marty Balin – vocals, rhythm guitar
- Jack Casady – bass
- Mark "Slick" Aguilar – lead guitar, background vocals
- Keith Crossan – saxophone, background vocals
- Tim Gorman – keyboards, background vocals
- Darrell Verdusco – drums, background vocals

Additional personnel

- Pete Escovedo – percussion on "Mariel"

== Production ==
- KBC Band – producer on all tracks
- Jim Gaines – producer and engineer on all tracks except "Sayonara"
- John Boylan – producer on "It's Not You, It's Not Me" and "Sayonara", additional production on "When Love Comes" and "No More Heartaches"
- Paul Grupp – engineer on "Sayonara"
- Stephen Hart, Rick Sanchez, Robert Missbach, Maureen Droney – assistant engineers
- Stephen Hart – additional engineering
- Frank Filipetti – mixing engineer
- Moira Marquis – assistant mixing engineer
- Steven Shmerler – art direction
- Leon Leach – inner sleeve photography
- Dyer/Kahn, Inc. – design
- Milton Sincoff – art production
- Vincent Lynch, Lynchpin Productions – management
- Cynthia Bowman – public relations
- Recorded at the Plant, Sausalito and Fantasy Studios, Berkeley
- Mixed at Right Track Recording, New York

== Charts ==
Chart (1986)	Peak position
The Billboard 200	75

=== Singles ===
Year	Single	Chart	Position
1986	"It's Not You, It's Not Me"	The Billboard Hot 100	89
1986	"It's Not You, It's Not Me"	Billboard Album Rock Tracks	6
1987	"America"	Billboard Album Rock Tracks	8
