= Deep Space/Virgin Sky =

Deep Space / Virgin Sky

Live album by Jefferson Starship
- Released: June 27, 1995 (original); 2003 (expanded)
- Recorded: January 21, 1995
- Venue: House of Blues (West Hollywood)
- Genre: Rock, psychedelic rock
- Length: 74:12
- Label: Intersound Records (original); Rainman, Inc, (expanded)
- Producer: Paul Kantner; Michael Gaiman

Jefferson Starship chronology
Nuclear Furniture (1984)	Deep Space / Virgin Sky (1995)	Windows of Heaven (1999)

Alternative cover
- Cover art of 2003 expanded release

Professional ratings
Review scores
Source	Rating
AllMusic	1.5/5 stars

Deep Space/Virgin Sky is a 1995 album by Jefferson Starship recorded live at the House of Blues in West Hollywood on the Sunset Strip. The concert was performed as a benefit memorial for violinist Papa John Creach, who had died in 1994, with proceeds going to his family.

The original album rearranged the order of songs as performed and was divided into two parts with the first half featuring new material and the second half of the album featuring the classic hits of Jefferson Starship and Jefferson Airplane, including an appearance by Grace Slick performing vocals on "Law Man," "Wooden Ships," "Somebody to Love" and "White Rabbit." It was the first time she had performed on stage since 1989. In 2003, the entire concert was released as a double CD entitled Deeper Space/Extra Virgin Sky with the original order of the performance restored.

== Original track listing (1995) ==
No.	Title	Writer(s)	Length
1.	"Shadowlands"	Paul Kantner	4:42
2.	"Ganja of Love"	Marty Balin	5:22
3.	"Dark Ages"	World Entertainment War	4:52
4.	"I'm on Fire"	Kantner	3:33
5.	"Papa John"	Balin	4:45
6.	"Women Who Fly"	Nona Hendryx	6:18
7.	"Gold"	L. Rowan	4:59
8.	"The Light"	Kantner	6:24
9.	"Crown of Creation"	Kantner	3:28
10.	"Count on Me"	Jesse Barish	4:46
11.	"Miracles"	Balin	7:44
12.	"Intro to Law Man" (by Grace Slick)		0:54
13.	"Law Man"	Grace Slick	2:55
14.	"Wooden Ships"	David Crosby, Kantner, Stephen Stills	6:03
15.	"Somebody to Love"	Darby Slick	3:27
16.	"White Rabbit"	G. Slick	3:28

== Expanded track listing (2003) ==
Disc one
No.	Title	Writer(s)	Length
1.	"Sunrise"	G. Slick	1:40
2.	"Have You Seen the Saucers"	Kantner	4:02
3.	"3/5 of a Mile in 10 Seconds"	Balin	4:35
4.	"Crown of Creation"	Kantner	3:29
5.	"I'm on Fire"	Kantner	3:32
6.	"Count on Me"	Barish	4:45
7.	"Gold"	Rowan	4:59
8.	"Shadowlands"	Kantner	4:41
9.	"Women Who Fly"	Hendryx	6:18
10.	"Dark Ages"	World Entertainment War	4:51
11.	"America"	Balin, Kantner	9:48
12.	"Miracles"	Balin	7:43

Disc two
No.	Title	Writer(s)	Length
1.	"Ganja of Love"	Balin	5:21
2.	"Plastic Fantastic Lover"	Balin	4:27
3.	"The Light"	Kantner	6:23
4.	"John's Other"	Papa John Creach	7:03
5.	"Somebody to Love"	D. Slick	3:27
6.	"Intro to Lawman" (by Grace Slick)		0:53
7.	"Law Man"	G. Slick	2:56
8.	"Wooden Ships"	Crosby, Kantner, Stills	6:02
9.	"White Rabbit"	G. Slick	3:29
10.	"Volunteers"	Balin, Kantner	6:27
11.	"Papa John"	Balin	4:44
12.	"The Other Side of This Life"	Fred Neil	11:08

== Personnel ==
- Jack Casady – basses
- Marty Balin – lead vocals, acoustic guitar, percussion
- Paul Kantner – lead vocals, 12-string guitar
- Prairie Prince – drums
- Slick Aguilar – lead guitar
- Tim Gorman – keyboards, vocals
- Darby Gould – vocals

=== Additional personnel ===
- Grace Slick – vocals on "Somebody to Love," "Law Man," "Wooden Ships," "White Rabbit" and "Volunteers"
- Merl Saunders – keyboards on "John's Other"
- David LaFlamme – violin on "John's Other"

=== Production ===
- Michael Gaiman – producer
- Paul Kantner – producer
- Greg Irons – cover art (original release)
- Prairie Prince – inside art (original release), cover art (expanded release)
- Andy Slote – mixing
- Jeff Kliment – remixing
- Rebecca Inez Bockelie – poetry
- Otto Rene Castillo – poetry
