= Switchblade Symphony =

American dark wave band

Background information
- Origin: San Francisco, California, U.S.
- Genres: Dark wave; gothic rock; symphonic rock; industrial rock
- Years active: 1989–1999
- Label: Cleopatra
- Past members: Susan Wallace; Tina Root; Robin Jacobs; George Earth; Eric Gebow; Scott van Shoick; Justin Clayton

Switchblade Symphony was an American dark wave band from San Francisco, California. Their music combined orchestral sounds with heavy synth sequences and ethereal vocals to create a union of classical music and gothic rock.

== History ==
Switchblade Symphony was formed in 1989 by composer Susan Wallace and vocalist Tina Root. The band's name refers to the cutting up elements of classical music to mix them with harder sounds.

They released their first album in 1995 on the Cleopatra Records label. They also had two live guitarists, first Robin Jacobs (who later joined Razor Skyline) and then George Earth (most recently of Small Halo, also with Tina Root), and three live drummers, first Eric Gebow (now with Blue Man Group), Justin Clayton, and then Scott van Shoick. The band's second album, Bread and Jam for Frances, was released in 1997. The album peaked at #119 on the CMJ Radio Top 200. By April 1999, the band had sold 80,000 copies of both of their albums.

They released their third and final studio album, “The Three Calamities" in May 1999, also on Cleopatra.

Switchblade Symphony disbanded in November 1999. Subsequently, Tina Root started Tre Lux. In 2008, Tina Root and George Earth formed Small Halo, a band based out of Los Angeles, California.

Their song "Clown" was featured in the 1998 film Wicked starring Julia Stiles. Their song "Gutter Glitter" was also featured in an episode of The Boulet Brothers' Dragula.

== Discography ==
=== Albums and EPs ===
- Serpentine Gallery (1995)
- Scrapbook (1997) (EP) (out of print)
- Bread and Jam for Frances (1997)
- The Three Calamities (1999)
- Sinister Nostalgia (2001) (remixes)
- Sweet, Little Witches (2003) (live performances and video track)
- Serpentine Gallery Deluxe (2005)
- Live in Los Angeles (2019) (live performance)

=== Singles ===
- "Clown" (1996)
- "Drool" (1997)

=== Other ===
- Fable (1991) (out of print demo cassette)
- Elegy (1992) (out of print demo cassette)
- "Girlscout" (single) (recorded with Jack Off Jill) (1998)

=== Compilation albums ===
- From the Machine, featured the song: "Mine Eyes" (Index Records, 1990)
- Gothic Rock Volume 2: 80's Into 90's (1995)
- Gothik (1995) (re-released in 2006)
- Wired Injections (1996)
- Gothic Divas Presents: Switchblade Symphony, Tre Lux, and New Skin (Cleopatra, 2006)
- Psycho Tina's Hell House Of Horrors, featured the song "Witches (Live)" (Cleopatra, )
- Burning From the Outside: Retail Slut, featured the song "Clown (Razed In Black Vs. Transmutator Remix) " (Cleopatra, 2007)
- The Devil's Songbook, featured the song "Wicked" (2010)
- Virgin Voices 2, A Tribute to Madonna, featured the song "Lucky Star"
