= The Three Calamities =

Studio album by Switchblade Symphony
- Released: May 25, 1999
- Genre: Trip hop, darkwave, gothic rock
- Length: 49:02
- Label: Cleopatra Records
- Producer: Switchblade Symphony

Switchblade Symphony chronology
Bread and Jam for Frances (1997)	The Three Calamities (1999)	Sinister Nostalgia (2001)

Professional ratings
Review scores
Source	Rating
AllMusic	4/5 stars

The Three Calamities is the third and final studio album from Switchblade Symphony. The album peaked at #25 on the CMJ RPM Charts in the U.S.

== Track listing ==
1. "Invisible" – 3:56
2. "Wicked" – 4:18
3. "Naked Birthday" – 4:11
4. "Invitation" – 3:23
5. "Fear" – 3:59
6. "Monsters" – 2:00
7. "Therapy" – 4:13
8. "Copycat" – 4:52
9. "Green" – 7:12 (not listed on the album cover)
10. "Into the Sky" – 4:10
11. "Anmorata" – 6:39
12. "Witches" – 4:19
13. "Drool (Mother)" – 5:11
14. "Clown" – 5:35
