= Bread and Jam for Frances =

Studio album by Switchblade Symphony
- Released: September 16, 1997
- Studio: Brilliant Studios, Private Island Trax
- Genre: Trip hop; dark wave
- Label: Cleopatra Records
- Producer: Switchblade Symphony

Switchblade Symphony chronology
Scrapbook (1997)	Bread and Jam for Frances (1997)	The Three Calamities (1999)

Bread and Jam for Frances is the second studio album by Switchblade Symphony. It was recorded at Brilliant Studios in San Francisco and Private Island Trax in Hollywood and mastered at Private Island Trax. The original CD artwork erroneously listed 15 tracks, with "Harpsichord" at track 7, though that song was not on the CD and later pressings corrected the error. The positions of "Dirty Dog" and "Roller Coaster" are also switched. The album peaked at #119 on the CMJ Radio Top 200.

== Critical reception ==
Professional ratings
Review scores
Source	Rating
AllMusic	3/5 stars

Dean Carlson for AllMusic praised the album for taking the "darkwave pretensions of Switchblade Symphony's previous material and pushed it through an even more stylized electronic filter."

Mark Jenkins of the Washington Post said the album sounded similar to Siouxsie and the Banshees, but praised the instrumentals of Susan Wallace, noting that "She incorporates hip-hop scratching, industrial rhythms and found sound into the band's music, giving tracks like 'Roller Coaster' and 'Harpsichord' a clattering vitality that belies their voice-from-the-grave ambience."

== Track listing ==
No.	Title	Writer(s)	Length
1.	"Witches"		4:18
2.	"Dirty Dog"	Eric Gebow, George Earth	4:22
3.	"Roller Coaster"		2:49
4.	"Situation #58"		0:56
5.	"Soldiers"		5:01
6.	"Sleep"		3:01
7.	"Funnel"		5:27
8.	"Insect"		3:42
9.	"Rampid"		3:04
10.	"Situation #9" (Guitar by Tina Root)		0:42
11.	"Sheep"		4:24
12.	"Fractal"	Eric Gebow, George Earth	1:45
13.	"Sick Mary"		0:58
14.	"Episode G 15" (Toy guitar by Eric Gebow)		0:46
Total length:			41:15
