= Rob Brezsny =

American astrologer, author, and musician

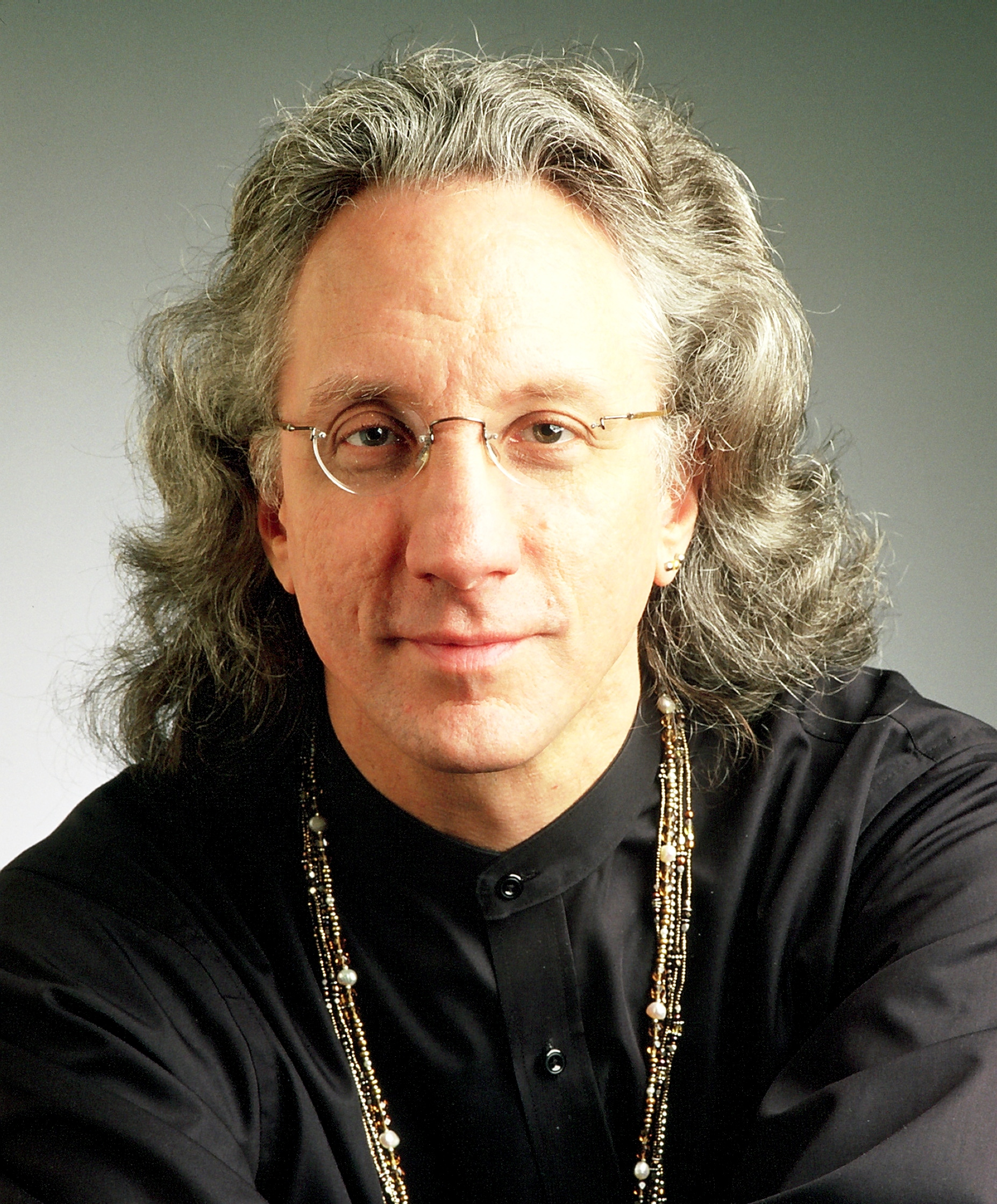
- Occupations: Astrologer; Author; Musician
- Website: www.freewillastrology.com

Rob Brezsny (born 21 June...) is an American astrologer, author, and musician. His weekly horoscope column "Free Will Astrology" – formerly "Real Astrology" – has been published since 1980, and by 2010 was syndicated in around 120 periodicals.

== Career ==
Brezsny uses first-person narrative in his horoscope columns, as well as a more literary approach than conventional horoscopes use. He conceives of astrology not as a science but as "a poetic language of the soul", comparing it to "a Neruda poem, Kandinsky paintings or a Nick Cave song." The Utne Reader described the column as "a blend of spontaneous poetry, feisty politics, and fanciful put-on", and The New York Times called it "glib, hectoring, oblique", and said that it appeals primarily to urban professionals "who turn to it for irreverence as much as for insight." Brezsny is quoted as saying "I'm on a mission to save people from the genocide of the imagination," and told the Times that his "secret agenda" is "to be a poet who gets paid for writing poetry." Brezsny said "I predict the present. I don't believe in predicting the future." The head of the mainstream New York Astrology Center called Brezsny's column "silly".

In the 1970s and 1980s, Brezsny was a singer and songwriter for Santa Cruz, California bands such as Kamikaze Angel Slander and Tao Chemical, and then, in the early 1990s, for the band World Entertainment War, for whom Brezsny wrote the song "Dark Ages", which was later recorded by Jefferson Starship for their 1995 album Deep Space / Virgin Sky. Jefferson Starship also recorded the World Entertainment War song "In A Crisis" on their 2008 album Jefferson's Tree of Liberty.

Brezsny contributed to the writing and soundtrack of the 1995 science fiction independent film The Drivetime.

Brezsny is author of the books Images Are Dangerous (1985); The Televisionary Oracle (2000), a novel; and a self-help book, Pronoia Is the Antidote for Paranoia: How the Whole World Is Conspiring To Shower You with Blessings (2005), which derives its name from the concept of pronoia.
