= Paul Kantner =

American rock musician (1941–2016)

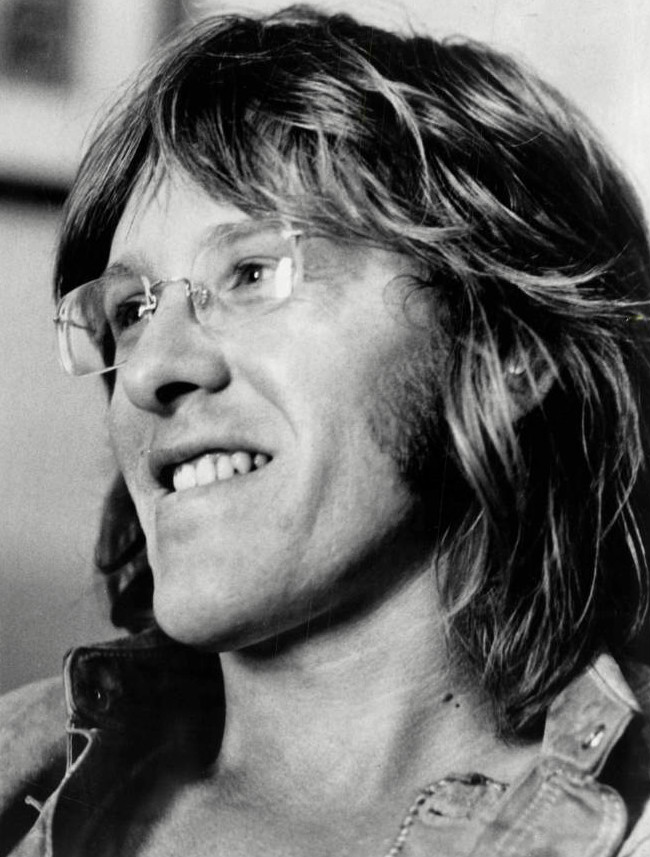
- Kantner in 1975

Background information
- Born: Paul Lorin Kantner; March 17, 1941; San Francisco, California, U.S.
- Died: January 28, 2016 (aged 74) San Francisco, California, U.S.
- Genres: Psychedelic rock; folk rock; acid rock
- Occupation: Musician
- Instruments: Guitar; vocals
- Years active: 1964–2016
- Labels: RCA; Grunt; Arista
- Formerly of: Jefferson Airplane; Jefferson Starship; KBC Band

Paul Lorin Kantner (March 17, 1941 – January 28, 2016) was an American rock musician. He is best known as the co-founder, rhythm guitarist, and a secondary vocalist of Jefferson Airplane, a leading psychedelic rock band of the counterculture era. He continued these roles as a member of Jefferson Starship, Jefferson Airplane's successor band.

Jefferson Airplane was formed in 1965 when Kantner met Marty Balin. Kantner eventually became the leader of the group and led it through its highly successful late-1960s period. In 1970, while still active with Jefferson Airplane, Kantner and several Bay Area musicians recorded the album Blows Against the Empire, which was co-credited to both Paul Kantner and "Jefferson Starship".

Jefferson Airplane continued to record and perform until 1973. Kantner revived the Jefferson Starship name in 1974 and continued to record and perform with them through 1984. He later led a reformed Jefferson Starship from 1992 until his death in 2016. Kantner had the longest continuous membership with the band, with 19 years in the original run of Jefferson Airplane and Jefferson Starship and 24 years in the revived Jefferson Starship. At times, he was the only founding Jefferson Airplane member to remain in Jefferson Starship. He was inducted into the Rock and Roll Hall of Fame as a member of Jefferson Airplane in 1996.

== Early life ==
Kantner was born on March 17, 1941, in San Francisco, California, the son of Cora Lee (Fortier) and Paul Schell Kantner. Kantner had a half-brother and a half-sister by his father's first marriage, both much older than he. His father was of German descent, and his mother was of French and German ancestry. His mother died when he was eight years old, and Kantner remembered that he was not allowed to attend her funeral; his father sent him to the circus instead.

After his mother's death, his father, who was a traveling salesman, sent young Kantner to Catholic military boarding school. At the age of eight or nine, in the school's library, he read his first science fiction book, finding an escape by immersing himself in science fiction and music from then on. As a teenager he went into total revolt against all forms of authority, and he decided to become a protest folk singer in the manner of his musical hero, Pete Seeger.

After graduating from Saint Mary's College High School, he attended the University of Santa Clara (where he first befriended classmate Jorma Kaukonen) and San Jose State College (now San José State University), completing three years of coursework before dropping out to enter the music scene. For a while, he shared a communal house in Venice, Los Angeles with several other folk singers who would subsequently transition to rock, including David Crosby and David Freiberg.

== Musical career ==
=== 1965–1974: Jefferson Airplane, Blows Against the Empire, Sunfighter, and Baron von Tollbooth ===
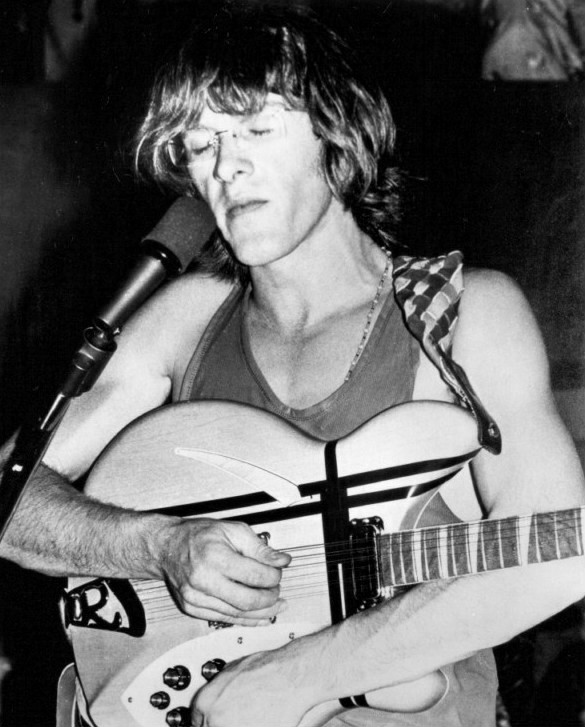
Kantner in 1972

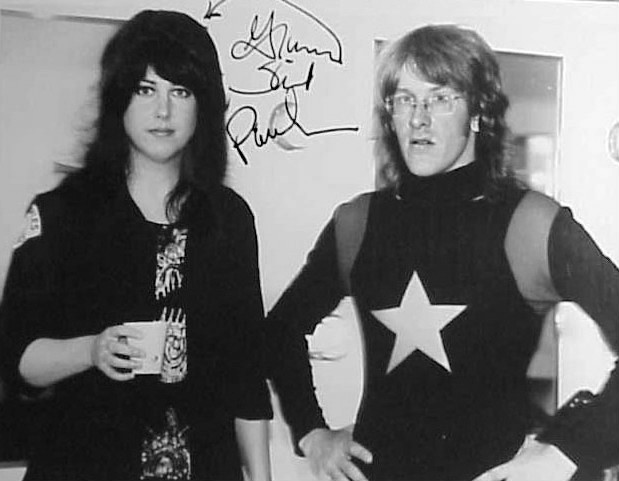
Kantner and Grace Slick, circa 1977, while members of Jefferson Starship

During the summer of 1965, singer Marty Balin saw Kantner perform at the Drinking Gourd, a San Francisco folk club, and invited him to co-found a new band, Jefferson Airplane. When the group needed a lead guitarist, Kantner recommended Kaukonen. As rhythm guitarist and one of the band's singers, Kantner was the only musician to appear on all albums recorded by Jefferson Airplane as well as Jefferson Starship. Kantner's songwriting often featured whimsical or political lyrics with science fiction or fantasy themes, usually set to music that had an almost martial rock sound.

Although the band retained a relatively egalitarian songwriting structure, Kantner became Jefferson Airplane's dominant creative force from 1967's After Bathing at Baxter's onward, writing the chart hits "The Ballad of You and Me and Pooneil", "Watch Her Ride" and "Crown of Creation"; the controversial "We Can Be Together"; and, with Balin, "Today" (an earlier effort from Surrealistic Pillow) and "Volunteers". He also co-wrote the song "Wooden Ships" with David Crosby and Stephen Stills, but was not credited initially due to pending litigation with Jefferson Airplane's first manager. Balin praised Kantner's music, but said Kantner was difficult to get along with and that he refused to do the music of others.

With Jefferson Airplane, Kantner was among the performers at the Monterey Jazz Festival in 1966, the 1967 Monterey Pop Festival and the 1969 Woodstock Festival. In 1969, the group played at Altamont, where Balin was knocked unconscious during their set by a Hells Angels member hired as security for the concert. Kantner appears in the documentary film about the Altamont concert, Gimme Shelter, in an on-stage confrontation with a Hell's Angel regarding the altercation.

Despite its commercial success, the Airplane was plagued by intra-group fighting, causing the band to begin splintering at the height of its success. This was exacerbated by manager Bill Graham, who prodded the group to do more touring and more recording. During the transitional period of the early 1970s, as the Airplane started to come apart, Kantner recorded Blows Against The Empire, a concept album featuring an ad hoc group of musicians whom he dubbed Jefferson Starship. This earliest edition of Jefferson Starship included members of Crosby, Stills, Nash & Young (David Crosby and Graham Nash) and the Grateful Dead (Jerry Garcia, Bill Kreutzmann and Mickey Hart) alongside some of the other members of Jefferson Airplane (Grace Slick, Joey Covington and Jack Casady).

In Blows Against the Empire, Kantner and Slick sang about a group of people escaping Earth in a hijacked starship. The album was nominated in 1971 for the Hugo Award, the premiere prize awarded by science fiction fandom. Although it received a plurality of the vote in the Best Dramatic Presentation category, this was superseded by a majority that elected not to award the prize that year. A sequel (Planet Earth Rock and Roll Orchestra) including several Blows Against the Empire participants was released as a Kantner solo album in 1983.

Kantner had been in love with Grace Slick for some time, but she was involved in a relationship with the band's drummer, Spencer Dryden. After their two-year affair ended, he finally had a chance with Grace. In 1969, they began living together publicly as a couple. Rolling Stone called them "the psychedelic John and Yoko." Slick became pregnant, and a song about their child's impending birth, "A Child Is Coming," appeared on Blows Against the Empire. Kantner and Slick's daughter China Wing Kantner was born in 1971.

Kantner and Slick released two follow-up albums. Sunfighter was an environmentalism-tinged album released in 1971 to celebrate China's birth. China appears on the album cover, and the track list includes "China", a song written and sung by Slick about her new baby. Kantner and Slick made news again in 1972, when they were accused of assaulting a policeman after their Akron, Ohio concert. 1973's Baron von Tollbooth and the Chrome Nun was named after the nicknames David Crosby had given to the couple. Through longtime friend Jack Traylor, Kantner discovered teenaged guitarist Craig Chaquico in 1971. Chaquico contributed to Sunfighter and Baron von Tollbooth before going on to play with all of the incarnations of the Starship name until 1990.

=== 1974–1984: Jefferson Starship and Planet Earth Rock and Roll Orchestra ===
After Kaukonen and Casady left the Airplane in 1973 to devote their full attention to Hot Tuna, the core band on Baron von Tollbooth was formally reborn as Jefferson Starship in early 1974. Kantner, Slick and the three remaining late-Airplane holdovers (vocalist/bassist/keyboardist David Freiberg; drummer John Barbata; and electric fiddler Papa John Creach) were joined by Chaquico and Peter Kaukonen (Jorma's brother), who was shortly replaced by Pete Sears, a contributor to previous solo efforts by Creach and Slick who alternated with Freiberg on bass and keyboards. Following a long sabbatical, Marty Balin began to work with Jefferson Starship while their first album, Dragon Fly, was still in the works, co-writing the early power ballad "Caroline" with Kantner and performing the song on the album. Although "Caroline" failed to chart, the album peaked at No. 11, better than any Jefferson Airplane-related effort in three years. By 1975's bestselling Red Octopus (including the No. 3 hit "Miracles"), Balin was a full member and had ensconced himself as a major creative force in the group with the epochal song. Both Red Octopus and 1976's Spitfire (which featured another Balin-penned hit in the No. 12 "With Your Love") saw Kantner amalgamate his usual songwriting approach with the soft rock ethos favored by the group in such songs as "I Want To See Another World," "St. Charles" (a minor hit that peaked at No. 64 in 1976) and the "Song to the Sun" suite.

Although Earth (1978) – to which Kantner contributed just one song – duplicated the success of Red Octopus and Spitfire with two major Balin-sung soft rock hits (Jesse Barish's "Count on Me" [No. 8] and N. Q. Dewey's "Runaway" [No. 12]), Jefferson Starship saw major personnel changes before year's end. Slick had left Kantner in 1975 to marry Skip Johnson, a Jefferson Starship roadie. Despite the dissolution of their romantic relationship, she remained with the band through June 1978, when she left the group to seek rehabilitation for her alcoholism after Kantner asked for her resignation following two disastrous concerts in Germany. Shortly thereafter, Balin quit the group in October 1978 to pursue a solo career. While no attempt was made to replace Slick, Balin was soon replaced by Mickey Thomas, who had previously achieved success as a member of the Elvin Bishop Group.

Freedom at Point Zero, a hard rock album dominated by Kantner compositions, was released in November 1979; it marked the band's last Top Ten album (peaking at No. 10) and included the No. 14 "Jane", a collaboration between Freiberg, musician Jim McPherson, Kantner and Chaquico. Kantner's new wave-inspired "Girl with the Hungry Eyes" also charted, peaking at No. 55.

In October 1980, Kantner was taken to Cedars-Sinai Medical Center in serious condition from a cerebral hemorrhage. Kantner had been working in Los Angeles on an album when he became ill. He was 39 years old at the time and beat considerable odds with a full recovery without surgery. A year later, Kantner talked about the experience, saying, "If there was a Big Guy up there willing to talk to me, I was willing to listen. But nothing happened. It was all just like a small vacation." It was his second brush with serious illness or injury, having suffered a serious motorcycle accident in the early 1960s: "I hit a tree at 40 miles an hour head first and nearly shattered my skull. I had a plate in there for a while." The injury from the motorcycle accident was credited with saving Kantner from serious complications from the cerebral hemorrhage; the hole left by the accident relieved the accompanying cranial pressure.

Grace Slick returned for 1981's Modern Times. The album, which peaked at No. 26, featured "Stairway to Cleveland (We Do What We Want)," a Kantner-penned declamatory punk rock pastiche inspired by a phrase uttered by Nite City guitarist Paul Warren. It marked the beginning of a new era of diminished success for the group; although Modern Times, Winds of Change (1982; No. 26) and Nuclear Furniture (1984; No. 28) all attained RIAA gold certifications and yielded several minor hits, they failed to eclipse the Balin-era group from a critical or commercial standpoint. Despite Kantner's efforts to retain a dialogue with the punk/new wave vanguard and a more idiosyncratic approach (exemplified by a lyrical collaboration with Ronnie Gilbert of The Weavers on the latter album), Jefferson Starship became increasingly beholden to the limitations of the album-oriented rock format. Additionally, the band continued to depend on external collaborators, including lyricist Jeannette Sears (the wife of Pete Sears) and songwriter/producer Peter Wolf.

In June 1984, Kantner left Jefferson Starship, complaining that the band had become too commercial and strayed too far from its countercultural roots. At the time, he was the only remaining original member of Jefferson Airplane in the group. Kantner made his decision to leave in the middle of the Nuclear Furniture tour. Upon his departure, Kantner took legal action against his former bandmates over the group's name after the rest of the band resolved to continue as Jefferson Starship; as Kantner's lawsuit proceeded, the group briefly performed as "Starship Jefferson." Kantner settled in March 1985, and the group name was reduced to Starship. Under the terms of the settlement, no group could call itself Jefferson Starship without Paul Kantner as a member, and no group can call itself Jefferson Airplane unless Grace Slick is on board.

=== 1984–2016: KBC Band, Jefferson Airplane reunion, and Jefferson Starship: The Next Generation ===
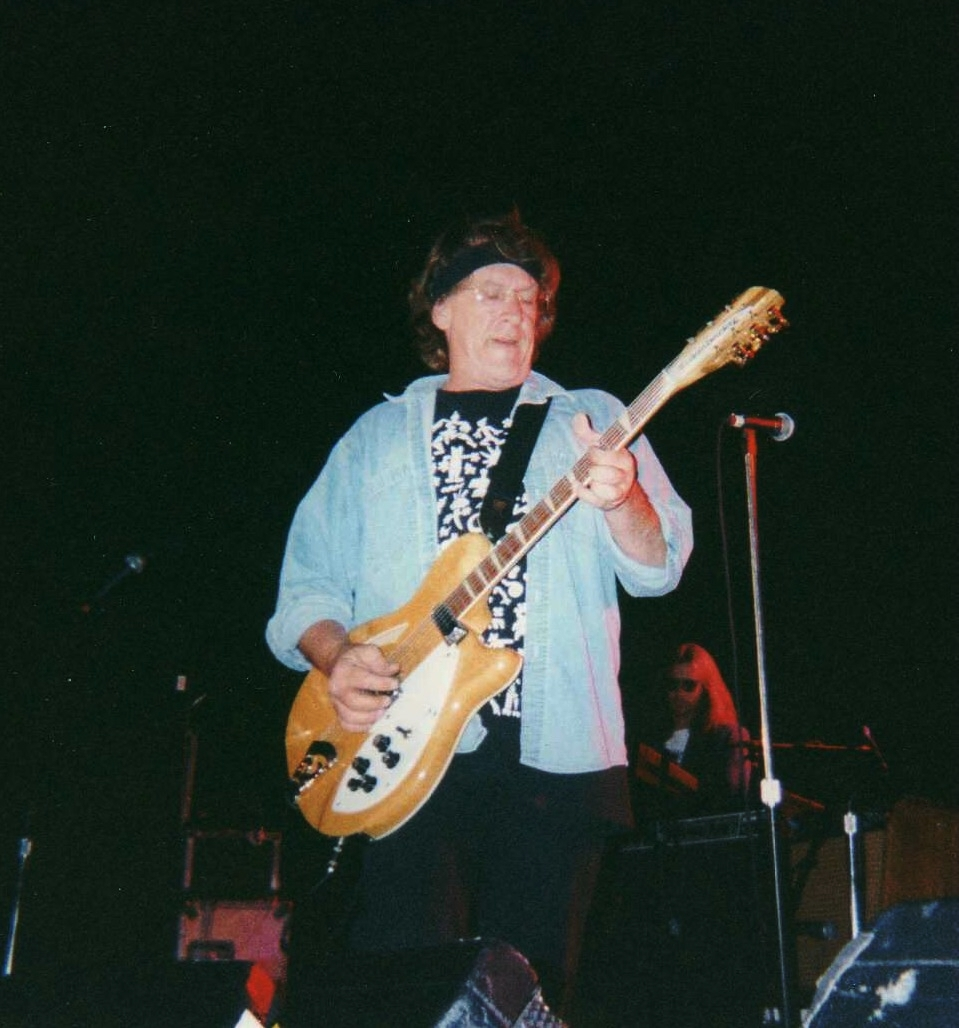
Kantner in concert with Jefferson Starship, 1996

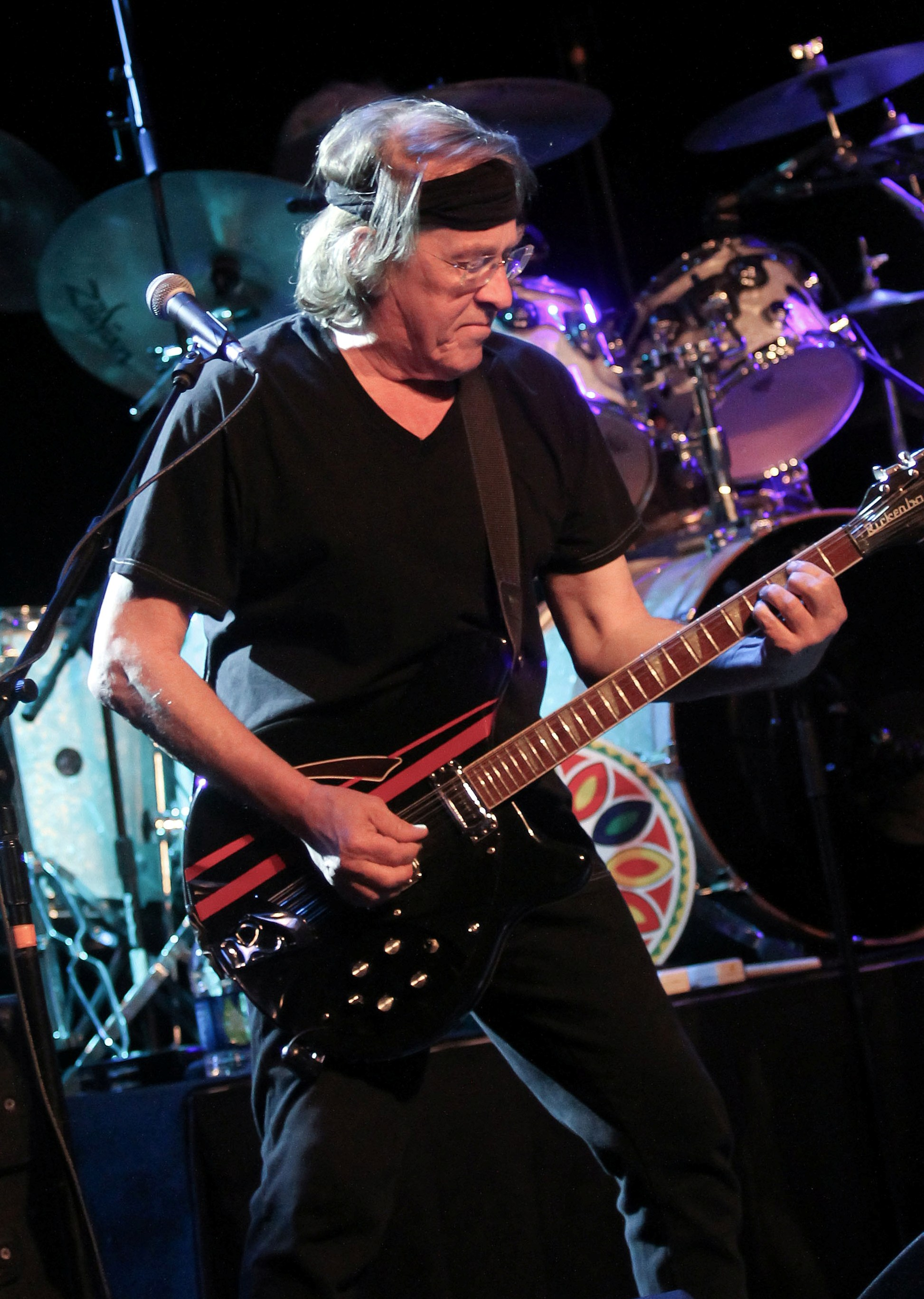
Kantner performing in 2011

In 1985, Kantner formed the KBC Band with Balin and Jack Casady; they released their only album, KBC Band, two years later on Arista Records. Although the album stalled at No. 75 in Billboard, a video was made for "America" (a Kantner-Balin collaboration that peaked at No. 8 on the Billboard Album Rock Tracks chart) and the band embarked on a national tour. In 1986, Kantner headed for court with Slick and her husband Skip Johnson over the taping of some telephone conversations.

With Kantner reunited with Balin and Casady, the KBC Band opened the door to a full-blown Jefferson Airplane reunion. Following the demise of the KBC Band in 1987, Kantner briefly rejoined Hot Tuna after performing in the band's first lineup eighteen years earlier. In 1988, Grace Slick sat in with the band at a San Francisco concert. This led to a formal reunion of the classic 1966-1970 Jefferson Airplane lineup save for Spencer Dryden. A self-titled album was released by Columbia Records. While the accompanying tour was a success, the revival proved to be short-lived; as in 1973, the group never formally disbanded. According to Grace Slick, the reunion began as a joke: "We hadn't even talked for a year, and we were battling legally – in fact, there are still some standing lawsuits between me and Paul, something to do with the Airplane. Anyway, the idea was that I'd just sneak in, stand at the side of the stage and come out and sing 'White Rabbit' and see what Paul did. Paul never got the joke, but he liked it, the audience liked it, and that's how it started."

Kantner and his Jefferson Airplane bandmates were inducted into the Rock and Roll Hall of Fame in 1996. The induction ceremony marked the first performance by most of the "classic" lineup of Marty Balin, Jorma Kaukonen, Jack Casady, Spencer Dryden and Kantner since 1970. Grace Slick had to miss the ceremonies because of a serious leg infection, but sent a message which Kantner delivered: "Grace sends her love."

In early 1992, Kantner reformed Jefferson Starship, with Balin joining a year later. Although Balin was forced to scale back his involvement with the group due to family exigencies in the mid-2000s, Kantner continued to tour and record with the band through 2015. Kantner was joined in the later versions of Jefferson Starship with various former Airplane and Starship members, most notably Casady and Freiberg, who effectively replaced Balin once again in 2005. With their latest female vocalist Cathy Richardson and Kantner's son Alexander Kantner on bass, Jefferson Starship released their first studio album since Windows of Heaven, titled Jefferson's Tree of Liberty in September 2008. The album was a return to Kantner's musical roots featuring covers of 1950s and 1960s protest songs from the American folk music revival.

In late 2010 Kantner started to compile collections of "sonic art" performed by him and various artists, including a mix of cover songs, sound effects, and spoken word, releasing multiple volumes under the title "Paul Kantner Windowpane Collective".

On March 25, 2015, it was reported that Kantner had suffered a heart attack. "Paul's health took a bad turn this week," the members of Jefferson Starship said via a Facebook post. "He's in the hospital, stable and undergoing tests to find out exactly what's going on, but doctors suspect he had a heart attack. He is in the best possible care and we are sending him all of our best wishes, good thoughts and healing vibes." The band also stated that they're "continuing the tour without him, as most of the shows are sold out or close to it and we have to honor our contracts and our fans who bought tickets and put on the best show possible," the band said in its official statement. "We will dedicate every show to Paul until he is well enough to rejoin us onstage." Kantner returned to the group later on in the year, in time to celebrate the 50th anniversary of Jefferson Airplane with special shows that also featured Grateful Dead tribute group Jazz is Dead.

== Personal life ==
Kantner had three children, including China Kantner. After joining the late 1960s San Francisco rock scene's exodus to suburban Marin County by briefly relocating to Bolinas, California in the early 1970s, he decided to return to San Francisco as the Jefferson Starship era dawned, residing for many years in "a beautiful house perched over the blue Pacific in the ritzy Sea Cliff neighborhood." Later in life, he moved to North Beach, where he frequented the original Caffe Trieste.

A lifelong cigarette smoker (with a penchant for unfiltered Camels), Kantner prophetically stated in a late-in-life interview, "I'm not going to give up the few things I enjoy. Might as well die of something I like." Identifying as a political anarchist, Kantner advocated the use of entheogens such as LSD for mind expansion and spiritual growth. He also was a prominent advocate of the legalization of marijuana, which he regularly consumed for most of his adult life. In a 1986 interview, Kantner shared his thoughts about cocaine and alcohol, saying: "Cocaine, particularly, is a bummer. It's a noxious drug that turns people into jerks. And alcohol is probably the worst drug of all. As you get older and accomplish more things in life in general, you realize that drugs don't help, particularly if you abuse them." When Kantner suffered a cerebral hemorrhage in 1980, his attending physician at Cedars-Sinai, Stephen Levy, was quick to point out it was not a drug-related problem, saying: "There is zero relationship between Paul's illness and drugs. He doesn't use drugs."

Belying his reputation as a near-teetotaler during the commercial heyday of Jefferson Airplane and Jefferson Starship, Kantner began to use alcohol more frequently in his later years, with bandmate Jude Gold ultimately characterizing Kantner's vodka intake as an "on-again/off-again love affair." In a 2016 reminiscence, Marty Balin reflected on this period: "It was sad to see. He didn't do anything to take care of his health with all his drinking and everything, smoking cigarettes all the time, pushing himself too much. He asked me to join him for this last go-round. He'd been touring around the world and I talked to him and said, 'You better be careful. Take care of yourself. You've got a grueling schedule.' He just said, 'Don't worry about me. I can do anything. I'm strong as a bull.' He WAS a hard-headed German."

== Death ==
Kantner died in San Francisco at the age of 74 on January 28, 2016, from multiple organ failure and septic shock after he suffered a heart attack days earlier. Shortly after Kantner's death, Grateful Dead drummer Mickey Hart called Kantner the band's backbone and said Kantner should have received the kind of credit that Slick, Casady and Kaukonen received. Coincidentally, he died on the same day as Airplane co-founder Signe Toly Anderson.

== Views on San Francisco and the 1960s ==
Kantner spent much of his life in San Francisco, a city of artistic and cultural freedom. He described it as “49 square miles surrounded by reality” and viewed the 1960s as a time of limitless possibilities. Reflecting on the era, he frequently recounted a belief that, for a brief period in 1966, the stars were so aligned that nearly any dream could be fulfilled – a sentiment he would emphasize by adding, “Which, needless to say, it was.”

== Discography ==
- Blows Against the Empire (1970) (credited to Paul Kantner/Jefferson Starship)
- Sunfighter (1971) (with Grace Slick)
- Baron von Tollbooth & the Chrome Nun (1973) (with Grace Slick and David Freiberg)
- Planet Earth Rock and Roll Orchestra (1983)
- A Guide Through the Chaos (A Road to the Passion): The Spoken Word History of The Jefferson Airplane & Beyond (1996)
- Windowpane Collective Vol. 1 – A Martian Christmas (2010)
- Windowpane Collective Vol. 2 – Venusian Love Songs (2011)

Other appearances

Year	Album	Collaborator	Comment
1971	If I Could Only Remember My Name	David Crosby	backing vocals on "What Are Their Names"
1971	Papa John Creach	Papa John Creach	rhythm guitar on "String Jet Rock"
1972	Rolling Thunder	Mickey Hart	rhythm guitar & backing vocals on "Blind John"
1974	Manhole	Grace Slick	vocals on "Theme from the Movie Manhole", "It's Only Music" & "Epic No. 38"; 12-string guitar on "It's Only Music"; rhythm guitar and glass harmonica on "Epic No. 38"
1984	Software	Grace Slick	backing vocals on "All the Machines" & "It Just Won't Stop"

== Films and books ==
=== Filmography ===
In 2004, a documentary containing 13 Jefferson Airplane performances and bandmember interviews was released on DVD. In 1991, Kantner and Slick appeared and provided commentary in The Doors: Live In Europe 1968. This VHS documentary film explores the experiences of the American rock band The Doors while touring Europe with Jefferson Airplane in 1968. Released on DVD in 2004.

- Fly Jefferson Airplane (2004)
- The Doors: Live In Europe 1968 (1991)

=== Books ===
- Nicaragua Diary. How I Spent My Summer Vacation, Or, I Was a Commie Dupe for the Sandinistas. by Paul Kantner, Little Dragon Press; 1st edition (1987)
- The Planet Earth Rock & Roll Orchestra. by Paul Kantner, Little Dragon Press; 1st edition (2001)
- Lyrica: Paul Kantner's Theory of Everything. by Paul Kantner, Little Dragon Press; 1st edition (2003)
