= List of Tower of Power members =

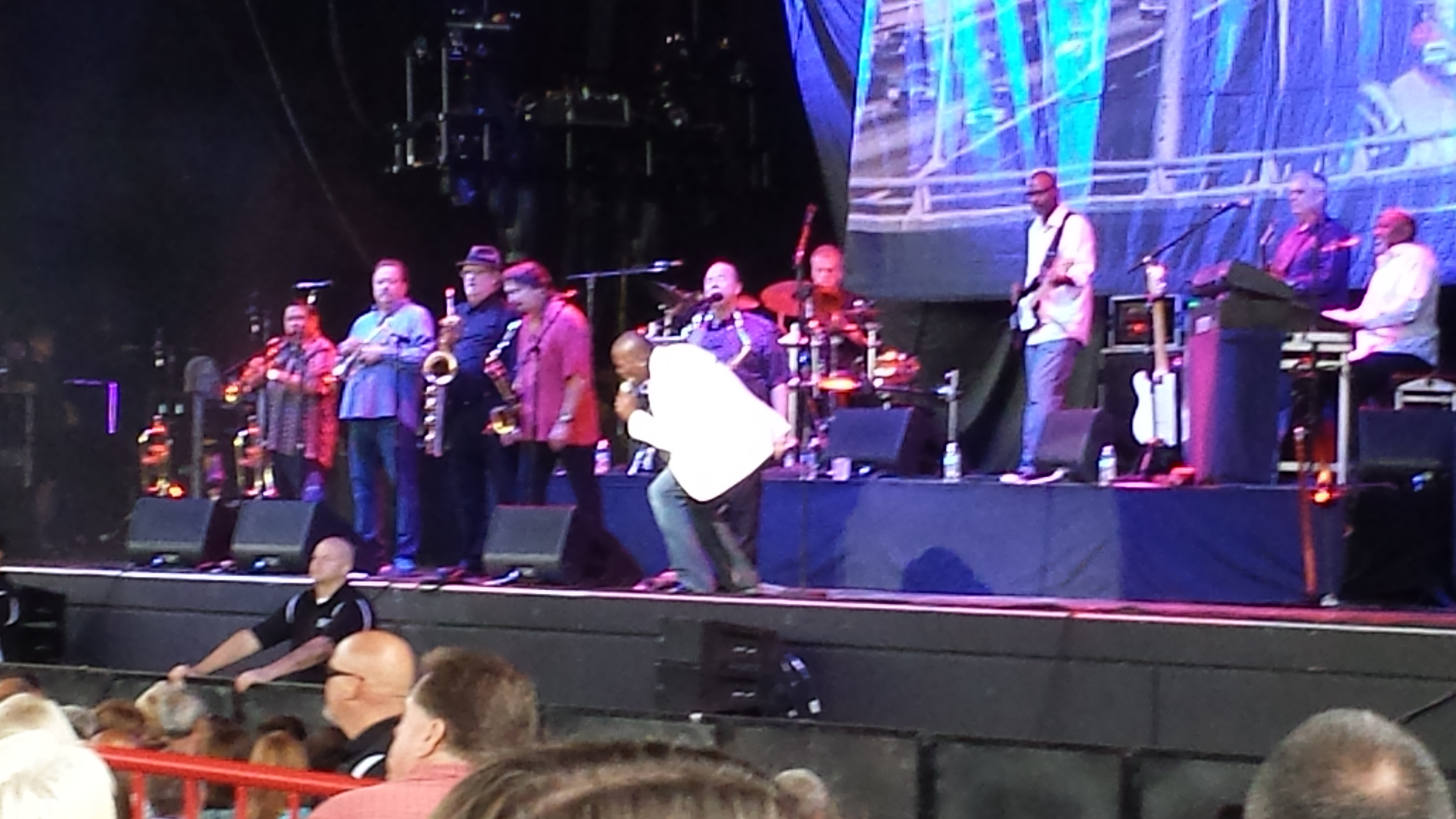
Tower of Power performing in 2014.

Tower of Power (TOP) is an American rhythm and blues band from Oakland, California. Formed in August 1968, the group is centred on a horn section which originally featured tenor saxophonists Emilio "Mimi" Castillo and Steven "Skip" Mesquite, baritone saxophonist Stephen "Doc" Kupka, and trumpeters Greg Adams, David Padron, Mic Gillette and Ken Balzell. The rest of the original lineup included vocalist Rufus Miller, guitarist Willie James Fulton, bassist Francis Rocco Prestia and drummer David Garibaldi.

Castillo and Kupka remain the only constant members of TOP, the current incarnation of which also features trumpeter Adolfo Acosta (since 2000), tenor saxophonist Tom E. Politzer (since 2002), guitarist Jerry Cortez (since 2010), bassist Marc van Wageningen (since 2018), keyboardist/vocalist Michael Jerel (from 2022 to 2024 and since 2025), trumpeter Dave Richards (since 2023), drummer Pete Antunes, and vocalist Jordan John (both since 2024).

== History ==
=== 1968–1981 ===
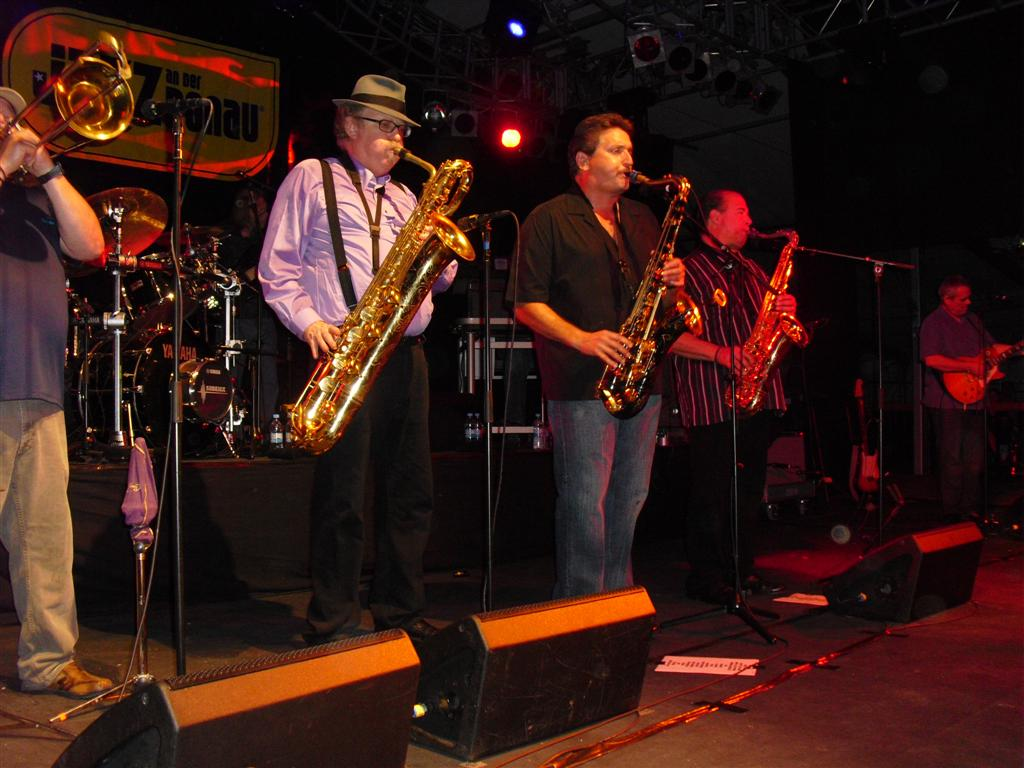
TOP was formed in 1968 by Emilio Castillo (first from right) and Stephen Kupka (first visible from left).

TOP was formed in August 1968, after Emilio Castillo and Stephen Kupka met for the first time the month before. The original horn section also featured Steven "Skip" Mesquite on lead tenor saxophone, alongside Greg Adams, David Padron, Mic Gillette and Ken Balzell on trumpets and other brass. The rest of the band was filled out by vocalist Rufus Miller, guitarist Willie James Fulton, bassist Rocco Prestia and drummer David Garibaldi. During the recording of the group's debut album East Bay Grease in 1969, Rick Stevens replaced Miller in time to perform lead vocals on one track. Following the release of East Bay Grease, only Adams and Gillette remained on trumpets, while the group had been joined by Brent Byars on additional percussion. The new lineup released Bump City in 1972.

Shortly after the release of Bump City, Stevens, Fulton and Mesquite were replaced by Lenny Williams, Bruce Conte and Lenny Pickett, respectively, while Chester Thompson joined as the band's first keyboardist. In 1973 the band released a self-titled album, which was followed in 1974 by Back to Oakland. During the recording of the group's next album Urban Renewal, Garibaldi briefly left due to increasing drug use amongst other members. His place was taken by David Bartlett, before he returned in early 1975. Around the same time, Williams departed to pursue a solo career and Hubert Tubbs took over. Tubbs and Garibaldi left after In the Slot, replaced by Edward McGee and Ron E. Beck. Ain't Nothin' Stoppin' Us Now followed in 1976, before Prestia was fired in late 1977 due to ongoing problems with substance abuse. At the same time, McGee was forced to leave due to vocal problems. The pair were replaced by Victor Conte and Michael Jeffries.

With Jeffries and Conte, TOP released We Came to Play! in 1978, before both Contes and Beck left the band – Garibaldi returned again, while Danny Hoefer and Vito Sanfilippo took over on guitar and bass. After the release of Back on the Streets, Garibaldi left for a third time in 1980. He was replaced by Mark Sanders, while original guitarist Willie Fulton also returned in place of Hoefer. In 1981, the horn section expanded to three trumpeters again with the addition of Rick Waychesko. This 11-piece lineup released Direct that year.

=== 1981–1994 ===
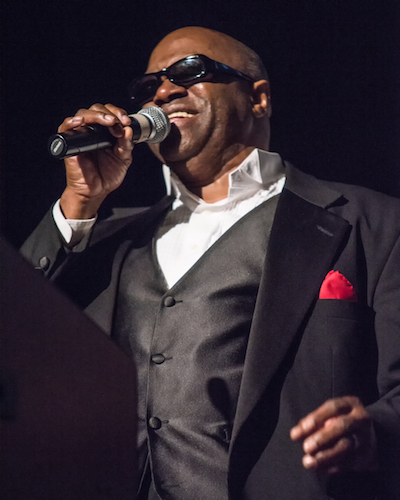
Ellis Hall was TOP's lead singer in the mid- to late-1980s. He also played keyboards and rhythm guitar.

Shortly after the release of Direct, long-term lead tenor saxophonist Lenny Pickett was replaced by Marc Russo. Waychesko left in 1982. During this period, TOP recorded an album that went unreleased until 1999, when it was issued as Dinosaur Tracks. After these sessions, in early 1983, keyboardist Chester Thompson left to join Santana. He was replaced by David K. Mathews. Around the same time, Mike Cichowicz took over from Waychesko. In 1984, the band's original bassist Francis Rocco Prestia returned, lead trumpet player Mic Gillette left to spend more time with his family, Ellis Hall replaced Michael Jeffries, and Mark Craney replaced Sanders. The following year, Richard Elliot replaced Russo. Craney remained until the summer of 1986, when he was forced to leave after contracting kidney disease.

In 1986, with Mick Mestek and Lee Thornburg replacing Craney and Cichowicz, the band recorded its first album in five years; the result, T.O.P., received a limited release, before it was edited and issued more widely as Power in 1987. After the album's recording, Fulton was replaced by Danny Jacob. By 1987, Jacob had made way for Frank Biner, while Mestek had been replaced by Steve Monreal. During 1988, Zeke Zirngiebel replaced Biner and Steve Grove replaced Elliot; Hall also left, with Castillo handling the majority of lead vocals, and Nick Milo taking over on keyboards. Later that year, Carmen Grillo took over from Zirngiebel on guitar.

During the tumultuous period following the release of 1987's Power, TOP reportedly came close to disbanding due to ongoing substance issues for leaders Castillo and Kupka, who became clean in 1988 and 1989, respectively. The additions of Milo and Grillo were followed by that of new vocalist Tom Bowes and drummer Russ McKinnon in 1989. Grove left in 1992, replaced by Paul Perez for the recording of 1993's T.O.P. For subsequent tour dates, David Mann took over the position.

=== 1994–2009 ===
Early 1994 saw another string of personnel changes in TOP: vocalist Brent Carter replaced Tom Bowes, drummer Herman Matthews replaced Russ McKinnon, and trumpeters Greg Adams and Lee Thornburg were replaced by Bill Churchville and Barry Danelian. Adams, a constant member since the band's formation, later stated about his departure simply that "I was at a point in my life where I needed to do something different. I was stagnating." The new lineup released Souled Out in 1995. The following year, John Scarpulla replaced David Mann. In early 1997, former Starship guitarist Jeff Tamelier replaced Carmen Grillo. After the release of Rhythm & Business that year, Danelien was replaced by Don Harris, who toured with the group from June to December 1997.

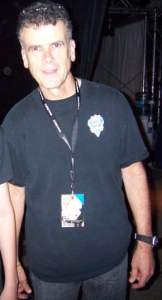
Original drummer David Garibaldi returned to TOP for a fourth tenure in early 1998, after 18 years away.

At the beginning of 1998, Matthews, Scarpulla and Harris were replaced by David Garibaldi (returning for his fourth tenure), Norbert Stachel and Jesse McGuire, respectively. The group recorded live album Soul Vaccination that October, after which Nick Milo left and Roger Smith took his place. In 2000, the band went through three more lineup changes: Mike Bogart replaced McGuire early in the year, Adolfo Acosta took over from Churchville in July, and Larry Braggs replaced Carter in November. When Stachel left to join Roger Waters' solo touring band in January 2002, Tom E. Politzer took his place in March.

During 2002 and 2003, Rocco Prestia was forced to step back from touring with TOP after having a liver transplant; he was replaced initially by Marc van Wageningen and later by Bobby Vega. In 2003, the band released its first studio album since 1997, Oakland Zone. By early 2006, Tamelier had left the band, replaced in the spring for tour dates by Trey Stone. By June that year, Stone had been replaced by former TOP guitarist Bruce Conte. Within a year he'd been replaced by Charles Spikes, who was replaced in late 2007 by Mark Harper. In 2008, TOP performed a special show to mark the 40th anniversary of its formation, which featured guest appearances by multiple former band members, and was released in 2011. The band issued Great American Soulbook in 2009, featuring Conte and Harper.

=== Since 2009 ===
In August 2009, TOP founding member Mic Gillette rejoined the group after 25 years out of the lineup, when Mike Bogart departed "to pursue a career in music education". In January 2010, Jerry Cortez replaced Mark Harper on guitar. Gillette left again in February 2011, temporarily replaced by the returning Lee Thornburg before Sal Cracchiolo took over that August. In the summer of 2013, vocalist Larry Braggs announced that he would be leaving TOP at the end of the year. He was temporarily replaced starting in September by Ray Greene, who later became an official member when Braggs left in December. By April 2016, Marcus Scott had taken over the role of TOP's lead vocalist, after Greene left to join Santana in February.

During 2018, Rocco Prestia was forced to retire permanently from touring with TOP due to ongoing health issues, with former stand-in Marc van Wageningen taking his place again. Prestia continued to perform on studio recordings, but the band considered van Wageningen their 'official' bassist. Prestia later died on September 29, 2020. The band released Soul Side of Town in 2018 followed by Step Up in 2020, both of which featured recordings by the Greene- and Scott-fronted incarnations of the band. Also in 2018, the group performed a 50th anniversary show which was released as an album in 2021, featuring former members including tenor saxophonist Lenny Pickett, keyboardist Chester Thompson, guitarist Bruce Conte and vocalist Greene, who played trombone.

When they returned to touring in 2021 after a break due to the COVID-19 pandemic, the lineup of TOP featured Greene returning on lead vocals and Harry Kim in place of trumpeter Cracchiolo. Due in part to Kim's busy schedule, he was soon replaced by Mike Bogart, who played lead trumpet with the band from 2000 to 2009. In early 2022, Greene once again departed for Santana, and was replaced by former The Voice contestant Mike Jerel. In 2023, Bogart left for a second time and was replaced by Dave Richards.

In January 2024, David Garibaldi announced his retirement from the band, and Jerel departed soon after. After brief stints by former members Herman Matthews (drums) and Ray Greene (vocals), Pete Antunes joined the band on drums and Jordan John took over on vocals. Roger Smith announced his retirement a year later, and former lead vocalist Mike Jerel returned to the band in 2025 to replace him on keys.

== Members ==
=== Current ===
Image	Name	Years active	Instruments	Release contributions
	Emilio "Mimi" Castillo	1968–present	tenor saxophone; backing and occasional lead vocals	all releases
	Stephen "Doc" Kupka	1968–present	baritone saxophone; oboe; backing vocals	all releases
	Adolfo Acosta	2000–present	trumpet; flugelhorn; backing vocals	Oakland Zone (2003); Great American Soulbook (2009); 40th Anniversary (2011); Soul Side of Town (2018); Step Up (2020); 50 Years of Funk & Soul: Live at the Fox Theater, Oakland CA (2021)
	Tom E. Politzer	2002–present	tenor, alto and baritone saxophones; clarinets; flutes; backing vocals	Oakland Zone (2003); Great American Soulbook (2009); 40th Anniversary (2011); Soul Side of Town (2018); Step Up (2020); 50 Years of Funk & Soul: Live at the Fox Theater, Oakland CA (2021)
	Jerry Cortez	2010–present	guitar; backing vocals	Soul Side of Town (2018); Step Up (2020); 50 Years of Funk & Soul: Live at the Fox Theater, Oakland CA (2021)
	Marc van Wageningen	2018–present (touring only 2018–2020; plus touring appearances beforehand)	bass	Soul Side of Town (2018); Step Up (2020); 50 Years of Funk & Soul: Live at the Fox Theater, Oakland CA (2021)
	Mike Jerel	2022–2024; 2025–present	keyboards; organ; trumpet; backing vocals; lead vocals (2022–2024)	none
	Dave Richards	2023–present	trumpet; flugelhorn; trombone; backing vocals	none
	Pete Antunes	2024–present	drums; percussion	none
	Jordan John	2024–present	lead vocals	none

=== Former ===
Image	Name	Years active	Instruments	Release contributions
	Greg Adams	1968–1994	trumpet; flugelhorn; French horn; backing vocals	all releases from East Bay Grease (1970) to T.O.P. (1993); Dinosaur Tracks (1999); The East Bay Archive Volume 1 (2008); 40th Anniversary (2011); Hipper Than Hip (2013); Live at Calderone Concert Hall (2015)
	Mic Gillette	1968–1984; 2009–2011 (died 2016)	trumpet; trombone; flugelhorn; French horn; backing vocals	all releases from East Bay Grease (1970) to Direct (1981); Rhythm & Business (1997); Dinosaur Tracks (1999); The East Bay Archive Volume 1 (2008); 40th Anniversary (2011); Hipper Than Hip (2013); Live at Calderone Concert Hall (2015)
	Francis Rocco Prestia	1968–1977; 1984–2020 (studio member only 2018–2020, until his death)	bass	all releases from East Bay Grease (1970) to Ain't Nothin' Stoppin' Us Now (1976), and from T.O.P. (1986) to Step Up (2020) (except Dinosaur Tracks)
	David Garibaldi	1968–1974; 1975–1976; 1979–1980; 1998–2024	drums; percussion; backing vocals	all releases from East Bay Grease (1970) to Live and in Living Color (1976), and from Soul Vaccination: Tower Of Power Live (1999) to 50 Years of Funk & Soul: Live at the Fox Theater, Oakland CA (2021); We Came to Play! (1978); Back on the Streets (1979); Soul Vaccination (1999)
	Willie James Fulton	1968–1972; 1980–1986	guitar; backing and occasional lead vocals	East Bay Grease (1970); Bump City (1972); Direct (1981); T.O.P. (1986); What Is Hip: Live at Iowa State University (1987); Dinosaur Tracks (1999)
	Steven "Skip" Mesquite	1968–1972 (died 2010)	tenor saxophone; flute; backing vocals	East Bay Grease (1970); Bump City (1972); 40th Anniversary (2011)
	David Padron	1968–1970	trumpet	East Bay Grease (1970)
	Ken Balzell (died 1991)	1968–1970	trumpet	East Bay Grease (1970)
	Rufus Miller	1968–1969 (died 2016)	lead and backing vocals	East Bay Grease (1970)
	Rick Stevens	1969–1972 (died 2017)	lead and backing vocals	East Bay Grease (1970); Bump City (1972)
	Brent Byars	1970–1974 (died 1987)	percussion; backing and lead vocals	Bump City (1972); Tower of Power (1973); Back To Oakland (1974); Urban Renewal (1975); The East Bay Archive Volume 1 (2008); 40th Anniversary (2011); Hipper Than Hip (2013)
	Chester Thompson	1972–1983	keyboards; synthesizers; backing vocals	all releases from Tower of Power (1973) to Direct (1981); Dinosaur Tracks (1999); The East Bay Archive Volume 1 (2008); 40th Anniversary (2011); Hipper Than Hip (2013); Live at Calderone Concert Hall (2015); 50 Years of Funk & Soul: Live at the Fox Theater, Oakland CA (2018)
	Lenny Pickett	1972–1981	tenor, alto and baritone saxophones; flutes; clarinet; synthesizers; backing vocals	all releases from Tower of Power (1973) to Direct (1981); T.O.P. (1993); Dinosaur Tracks (1999); The East Bay Archive Volume 1 (2008); Hipper Than Hip (2013); Live at Calderone Concert Hall (2015); 50 Years of Funk & Soul: Live at the Fox Theater, Oakland CA (2018)
	Bruce Conte	1972–1978 (died 2021)	guitar; backing and additional lead vocals	all releases from Tower of Power (1973) to We Came to Play! (1978); The East Bay Archive Volume 1 (2008); Great American Soulbook (2009); Hipper Than Hip (2013); Live at Calderone Concert Hall (2015)
	Lenny Williams	1972–1975	lead and backing vocals	Tower of Power (1973); Back to Oakland (1974); Urban Renewal (1975); The East Bay Archive Volume 1 (2008); Hipper Than Hip (2013)
	David Bartlett	1974–1975 (died 1990s)	drums; percussion; backing vocals	Urban Renewal (1975); In the Slot (1975); Live at Calderone Concert Hall (2015)
	Ron E. Beck	1976–1978	drums; percussion; backing and additional lead vocals	Ain't Nothin' Stoppin' Us Now (1976); We Came to Play! (1978); 40th Anniversary (2011)
	Edward McGee	1976–1977 (died 2017)	lead and backing vocals	Ain't Nothin' Stoppin' Us Now (1976)
	Michael Jeffries	1977–1984	lead and backing vocals	We Came to Play! (1978); Back on the Streets (1979); Direct (1981); Dinosaur Tracks (1999); 40th Anniversary (2011)
	Victor Conte	1977–1978 (died 2025)	bass	We Came to Play! (1978)
	Vito Sanfilippo	1978–1984	bass; backing vocals	Back on the Streets (1979); Direct (1981); Dinosaur Tracks (1999); 40th Anniversary (2011)
	Danny Hoefer	1978–1980	guitar	Back on the Streets (1979)
	Mark Sanders	1980–1984	drums; percussion	Direct (1981); Dinosaur Tracks (1999)
	Rick Waychesko	1981–1982	trumpet	Direct (1981)
	Marc Russo	1981–1985	alto and tenor saxophones	Dinosaur Tracks (1999); 40th Anniversary (2011)
	David K. Mathews	1983–1985	keyboards; synthesizers	What Is Hip: Live at Iowa State University (1987); 40th Anniversary (2011)
	Mike Cichowicz	1983–1985	trumpet; flugelhorn	What Is Hip: Live at Iowa State University (1987)
	Ellis Hall	1984–1988	lead and backing vocals; keyboards; rhythm guitar	T.O.P. (1986); Power (1987); What Is Hip: Live at Iowa State University (1987); 40th Anniversary (2011)
	Mark Craney	1984–1986 (died 2005)	drums	What Is Hip: Live at Iowa State University (1987)
	Richard Elliot	1985–1988	tenor and alto saxophones; lyricon	T.O.P. (1986); Power (1987); What Is Hip: Live at Iowa State University (1987); 40th Anniversary (2011)
	Lee Thornburg	1985–1994; 2011 (touring)	trumpet; flugelhorn; trombone; backing and additional lead vocals	T.O.P. (1986); Power (1987); Monster on a Leash (1991); T.O.P. (1993)
	Mick Mestek	1986–1987	drums	T.O.P. (1986); Power (1987); 40th Anniversary (2011)
	Danny Jacob	1986–1987	guitar	none
	Steve Monreal	1987–1989	drums	none
	Frank Biner	1987–1988 (died 2001)	guitar; backing vocals	none
	Nick Milo	1988–1998	keyboards; synthesizers; backing vocals	all releases from Monster on a Leash (1991) to Soul Vaccination (1999); 40th Anniversary (2011)
	Steve Grove	1988–1992	tenor and alto saxophones	Monster on a Leash (1991)
	Zeke Zirngiebel	1988	guitar; backing vocals	none
	Carmen Grillo	1988–1997	guitar; backing vocals	Monster on a Leash (1991); T.O.P. (1993); Souled Out (1995); 40th Anniversary (2011)
	Tom Bowes	1989–1994	lead and backing vocals	Monster on a Leash (1991); T.O.P. (1993)
	Russ McKinnon	1989–1994	drums; percussion	Monster on a Leash (1991); T.O.P. (1993); 40th Anniversary (2011)
	Paul Perez	1992–1993	tenor saxophone	T.O.P. (1993)
	David Mann	1993–1996	tenor saxophone	Souled Out (1995)
	Brent Carter	1994–2000	lead and backing vocals	Souled Out (1995); Rhythm & Business (1997); Soul Vaccination (1999)
	Bill Churchville	1994–2000	trumpet; flugelhorn; trombone; backing vocals	Souled Out (1995); Rhythm & Business (1997); Soul Vaccination (1999); 40th Anniversary (2011)
	Herman Matthews	1994–1998; 2024	drums; percussion	Souled Out (1995); Rhythm & Business (1997); 40th Anniversary (2011)
	Barry Danelian	1994–1997	trumpet; flugelhorn	Souled Out (1995); Rhythm & Business (1997)
	John Scarpulla	1996–1998	tenor saxophone	Rhythm & Business (1997)
	Jeff Tamelier	1997–2006	guitar; backing and additional lead vocals	Rhythm & Business (1997); Soul Vaccination (1999); Oakland Zone (2003); 40th Anniversary (2011)
	Don Harris	1997 (died 2023)	trumpet; flugelhorn	none
	Roger Smith	1998–2025	keyboards; organ; backing vocals	Oakland Zone (2003); Great American Soulbook (2009); 40th Anniversary (2011); Soul Side of Town (2018); Step Up (2020); 50 Years of Funk & Soul: Live at the Fox Theater, Oakland CA (2021)
	Norbert Stachel	1998–2002	tenor saxophone; flute	Soul Vaccination (1999); 40th Anniversary (2011)
	Jesse McGuire	1998–2000	trumpet; backing vocals	Soul Vaccination (1999)
	Mike Bogart	2000–2009; 2021–2023	trumpet; flugelhorn; trombone	Oakland Zone (2003); Great American Soulbook (2009); 40th Anniversary (2011)
	Larry Braggs	2000–2013	lead and backing vocals	Oakland Zone (2003); Great American Soulbook (2009); 40th Anniversary (2011)
	Bobby Vega	2002–2003 (touring substitute)	bass	none
	Trey Stone	2006	guitar	none
	Charles Spikes	2007	guitar	none
	Mark Harper	2007–2010	guitar	Great American Soulbook (2009); 40th Anniversary (2011)
	Sal Cracchiolo	2011–2021	trumpet; flugelhorn; backing vocals	Soul Side of Town (2018); Step Up (2020); 50 Years of Funk & Soul: Live at the Fox Theater, Oakland CA (2021)
	Ray Greene	2013–2021; 2024	lead and backing vocals; trombone	Soul Side of Town (2018); Step Up (2020); 50 Years of Funk & Soul: Live at the Fox Theater, Oakland CA (2021)
	Marcus Scott	2016–2021	lead and backing vocals	Soul Side of Town (2018); Step Up (2020); 50 Years of Funk & Soul: Live at the Fox Theater, Oakland CA (2021)
	Harry Kim	2021 (died 2026)	trumpet; flugelhorn	none

== Lineups ==
Period	Members		Releases
Period	Horn section	Rhythm section	Releases
1968–1969	Skip Mesquite – tenor saxophone, backing vocals; Emilio Castillo – tenor saxophone, backing vocals; Stephen "Doc" Kupka – baritone saxophone, backing vocals; Greg Adams – trumpet, flugelhorn, backing vocals; Mic Gillette – trumpet, trombone, backing vocals; David Padron – trumpet; Ken Balzell – trumpet	Rufus Miller – lead and backing vocals; Willie James Fulton – guitar, backing vocals; Francis Rocco Prestia – bass; David Garibaldi – drums, percussion, vocals	East Bay Grease (1970) – five tracks
1969–1970	Skip Mesquite – tenor saxophone, backing vocals; Emilio Castillo – tenor saxophone, backing vocals; Stephen "Doc" Kupka – baritone saxophone, backing vocals; Greg Adams – trumpet, flugelhorn, backing vocals; Mic Gillette – trumpet, trombone, backing vocals; David Padron – trumpet; Ken Balzell – trumpet	Rick Stevens – lead and backing vocals; Willie James Fulton – guitar, backing vocals; Francis Rocco Prestia – bass; David Garibaldi – drums, percussion, vocals	East Bay Grease (1970) – one track
1970–1972	Skip Mesquite – tenor saxophone, backing vocals; Emilio Castillo – tenor saxophone, backing vocals; Stephen "Doc" Kupka – baritone saxophone, backing vocals; Greg Adams – trumpet, flugelhorn, backing vocals; Mic Gillette – trumpet, trombone, backing vocals	Rick Stevens – lead and backing vocals; Willie James Fulton – guitar, backing vocals; Francis Rocco Prestia – bass; David Garibaldi – drums, percussion, vocals; Brent Byars – percussion, backing vocals	Bump City (1972)
1972–1974	Emilio Castillo – tenor saxophone, backing vocals; Lenny Pickett – saxophones, flute, backing vocals; Stephen "Doc" Kupka – baritone saxophone, backing vocals; Greg Adams – trumpet, flugelhorn, backing vocals; Mic Gillette – trumpet, trombone, backing vocals	Lenny Williams – lead and backing vocals; Bruce Conte – guitar, backing vocals; Francis Rocco Prestia – bass; Chester Thompson – keyboards, backing vocals; David Garibaldi – drums, percussion, vocals; Brent Byars – percussion, backing vocals	Tower of Power (1973); Back to Oakland (1974); Urban Renewal (1975) – one track; The East Bay Archive Volume 1 (2008); Hipper Than Hip (2013)
Late 1974 – early 1975	Emilio Castillo – tenor saxophone, backing vocals; Lenny Pickett – saxophones, flute, backing vocals; Stephen "Doc" Kupka – baritone saxophone, backing vocals; Greg Adams – trumpet, flugelhorn, backing vocals; Mic Gillette – trumpet, trombone, backing vocals	Lenny Williams – lead and backing vocals; Bruce Conte – guitar, backing vocals; Francis Rocco Prestia – bass; Chester Thompson – keyboards, backing vocals; David Bartlett – drums, percussion, vocals	Urban Renewal (1975) – remaining tracks
Early 1975 – early 1976	Emilio Castillo – tenor saxophone, backing vocals; Lenny Pickett – saxophones, flute, backing vocals; Stephen "Doc" Kupka – baritone saxophone, backing vocals; Greg Adams – trumpet, flugelhorn, backing vocals; Mic Gillette – trumpet, trombone, backing vocals	Hubert Tubbs – lead and backing vocals; Bruce Conte – guitar, backing vocals; Francis Rocco Prestia – bass; Chester Thompson – keyboards, backing vocals; David Garibaldi – drums, percussion, vocals	In the Slot (1975); Live and in Living Color (1976); Live at Calderone Concert Hall (2015)
Early 1976 – late 1977	Emilio Castillo – tenor saxophone, backing vocals; Lenny Pickett – saxophones, flute, backing vocals; Stephen "Doc" Kupka – baritone saxophone, backing vocals; Greg Adams – trumpet, flugelhorn, backing vocals; Mic Gillette – trumpet, trombone, backing vocals	Edward McGee – lead and backing vocals; Bruce Conte – guitar, backing vocals; Francis Rocco Prestia – bass; Chester Thompson – keyboards, backing vocals; Ron E. Beck – drums, percussion, vocals	Ain't Nothin' Stoppin' Us Now (1976)
Late 1977 – summer 1978	Emilio Castillo – tenor saxophone, backing vocals; Lenny Pickett – saxophones, flute, backing vocals; Stephen "Doc" Kupka – baritone saxophone, backing vocals; Greg Adams – trumpet, flugelhorn, backing vocals; Mic Gillette – trumpet, trombone, backing vocals	Michael Jeffries – lead and backing vocals; Bruce Conte – guitar, backing vocals; Victor Conte – bass; Chester Thompson – keyboards, backing vocals; Ron E. Beck – drums, percussion, vocals	We Came to Play! (1978)
1978–1980	Emilio Castillo – tenor saxophone, backing vocals; Lenny Pickett – saxophones, flute, backing vocals; Stephen "Doc" Kupka – baritone saxophone, backing vocals; Greg Adams – trumpet, flugelhorn, backing vocals; Mic Gillette – trumpet, trombone, backing vocals	Michael Jeffries – lead and backing vocals; Danny Hoefer – guitar; Vito Sanfilippo – bass, backing vocals; Chester Thompson – keyboards, backing vocals; David Garibaldi – drums, percussion, vocals	Back on the Streets (1979)
1980–1981	Emilio Castillo – tenor saxophone, backing vocals; Lenny "Doc" Pickett – saxophones, flute, backing vocals; Stephen Kupka – baritone saxophone, backing vocals; Greg Adams – trumpet, flugelhorn, backing vocals; Mic Gillette – trumpet, trombone, backing vocals	Michael Jeffries – lead and backing vocals; Willie James Fulton – guitar, backing vocals; Vito Sanfilippo – bass, backing vocals; Chester Thompson – keyboards, backing vocals; Mark Sanders – drums	Dinosaur Tracks (1999) – one track
1981	Emilio Castillo – tenor saxophone, backing vocals; Lenny Pickett – saxophones, flute, backing vocals; Stephen "Doc" Kupka – baritone saxophone, backing vocals; Greg Adams – trumpet, flugelhorn, backing vocals; Mic Gillette – trumpet, trombone, backing vocals; Rick Waychesko – trumpet	Michael Jeffries – lead and backing vocals; Willie James Fulton – guitar, backing vocals; Vito Sanfilippo – bass, backing vocals; Chester Thompson – keyboards, backing vocals; Mark Sanders – drums	Direct (1981)
1981–1982	Emilio Castillo – tenor saxophone, backing vocals; Marc Russo – alto and tenor saxophones; Stephen "Doc" Kupka – baritone saxophone, backing vocals; Greg Adams – trumpet, flugelhorn, backing vocals; Mic Gillette – trumpet, trombone, backing vocals; Rick Waychesko – trumpet	Michael Jeffries – lead and backing vocals; Willie James Fulton – guitar, backing vocals; Vito Sanfilippo – bass, backing vocals; Chester Thompson – keyboards, backing vocals; Mark Sanders – drums	none
1982–1983	Emilio Castillo – tenor saxophone, backing vocals; Marc Russo – alto and tenor saxophones; Stephen "Doc" Kupka – baritone saxophone, backing vocals; Greg Adams – trumpet, flugelhorn, backing vocals; Mic Gillette – trumpet, trombone, backing vocals	Michael Jeffries – lead and backing vocals; Willie James Fulton – guitar, backing vocals; Vito Sanfilippo – bass, backing vocals; Chester Thompson – keyboards, backing vocals; Mark Sanders – drums	Dinosaur Tracks (1999) – remaining tracks
1983–1984	Emilio Castillo – tenor saxophone, backing vocals; Marc Russo – alto and tenor saxophones; Stephen "Doc" Kupka – baritone saxophone, backing vocals; Greg Adams – trumpet, flugelhorn, backing vocals; Mic Gillette – trumpet, trombone, backing vocals; Mike Cichowicz – trumpet, flugelhorn	Michael Jeffries – lead and backing vocals; Willie James Fulton – guitar, backing vocals; Vito Sanfilippo – bass, backing vocals; David K. Mathews – keyboards; Mark Sanders – drums	none
1984–1985	Emilio Castillo – tenor saxophone, backing vocals; Marc Russo – alto and tenor saxophones; Stephen "Doc" Kupka – baritone saxophone, backing vocals; Greg Adams – trumpet, flugelhorn, backing vocals; Mike Cichowicz – trumpet, flugelhorn	Ellis Hall – lead vocals, keyboards, guitar; Willie James Fulton – guitar, backing vocals; Francis Rocco Prestia – bass; David K. Mathews – keyboards; Mark Craney – drums	none
1985	Emilio Castillo – tenor saxophone, backing vocals; Richard Elliot – saxophones, lyricon; Stephen "Doc" Kupka – baritone saxophone, backing vocals; Greg Adams – trumpet, flugelhorn, backing vocals; Mike Cichowicz – trumpet, flugelhorn	Ellis Hall – lead vocals, keyboards, guitar; Willie James Fulton – guitar, backing vocals; Francis Rocco Prestia – bass; David K. Mathews – keyboards; Mark Craney – drums	What Is Hip: Live at Iowa State University (1987)
1985–1986	Emilio Castillo – tenor saxophone, backing vocals; Richard Elliot – saxophones, lyricon; Stephen "Doc" Kupka – baritone saxophone, backing vocals; Greg Adams – trumpet, flugelhorn, backing vocals; Lee Thornburg – trumpet, trombone, vocals	Ellis Hall – lead vocals, keyboards, guitar; Willie James Fulton – guitar, backing vocals; Francis Rocco Prestia – bass; Mark Craney – drums	none
1986	Emilio Castillo – tenor saxophone, backing vocals; Richard Elliot – saxophones, lyricon; Stephen "Doc" Kupka – baritone saxophone, backing vocals; Greg Adams – trumpet, flugelhorn, backing vocals; Lee Thornburg – trumpet, trombone, vocals	Ellis Hall – lead vocals, keyboards, guitar; Willie James Fulton – guitar, backing vocals; Francis Rocco Prestia – bass; Mick Mestek – drums	T.O.P. (1986); Power (1987)
1986–1987	Emilio Castillo – tenor saxophone, backing vocals; Richard Elliot – saxophones, lyricon; Stephen "Doc" Kupka – baritone saxophone, backing vocals; Greg Adams – trumpet, flugelhorn, backing vocals; Lee Thornburg – trumpet, trombone, vocals	Ellis Hall – lead vocals, keyboards, guitar; Danny Jacob – guitar; Francis Rocco Prestia – bass; Mick Mestek – drums	none
1987–1988	Emilio Castillo – tenor saxophone, backing vocals; Richard Elliot – saxophones, lyricon; Stephen "Doc" Kupka – baritone saxophone, backing vocals; Greg Adams – trumpet, flugelhorn, backing vocals; Lee Thornburg – trumpet, trombone, vocals	Ellis Hall – lead vocals, keyboards, guitar; Frank Biner – guitar, backing vocals; Francis Rocco Prestia – bass; Steve Monreal – drums	none
1988	Emilio Castillo – lead vocals, tenor saxophone; Steve Grove – tenor and alto saxophones; Stephen "Doc" Kupka – baritone saxophone, backing vocals; Greg Adams – trumpet, flugelhorn, backing vocals; Lee Thornburg – trumpet, trombone, vocals; Alan Chez Lead trumpet , vocals	Zeke Zirngiebel – guitar, backing vocals; Francis Rocco Prestia – bass; Nick Milo – keyboards, backing vocals; Steve Monreal – drums	none
1988–1989	Emilio Castillo – lead vocals, tenor saxophone; Steve Grove – tenor and alto saxophones; Stephen "Doc" Kupka – baritone saxophone, backing vocals; Greg Adams – trumpet, flugelhorn, backing vocals; Lee Thornburg – trumpet, trombone, vocals	Carmen Grillo – guitar, backing vocals; Francis Rocco Prestia – bass; Nick Milo – keyboards, backing vocals; Steve Monreal – drums	none
1989–1992	Emilio Castillo – tenor saxophone, backing vocals; Steve Grove – tenor and alto saxophones; Stephen "Doc" Kupka – baritone saxophone, backing vocals; Greg Adams – trumpet, flugelhorn, backing vocals; Lee Thornburg – trumpet, trombone, vocals	Tom Bowes – lead and backing vocals; Carmen Grillo – guitar, backing vocals; Francis Rocco Prestia – bass; Nick Milo – keyboards, backing vocals; Russ McKinnon – drums, percussion	Monster on a Leash (1991)
1992–1993	Emilio Castillo – tenor saxophone, backing vocals; Paul Perez – tenor saxophone; Stephen "Doc" Kupka – baritone saxophone, backing vocals; Greg Adams – trumpet, flugelhorn, backing vocals; Lee Thornburg – trumpet, trombone, vocals	Tom Bowes – lead and backing vocals; Carmen Grillo – guitar, backing vocals; Francis Rocco Prestia – bass; Nick Milo – keyboards, backing vocals; Russ McKinnon – drums, percussion	T.O.P. (1993)
1993–1994	Emilio Castillo – tenor saxophone, backing vocals; David Mann – tenor saxophone; Stephen "Doc" Kupka – baritone saxophone, backing vocals; Greg Adams – trumpet, flugelhorn, backing vocals; Lee Thornburg – trumpet, trombone, vocals; Alan Chez Lead trumpet , vocals .	Tom Bowes – lead and backing vocals; Carmen Grillo – guitar, backing vocals; Francis Rocco Prestia – bass; Nick Milo – keyboards, backing vocals; Russ McKinnon – drums, percussion	none
1994–1996	Emilio Castillo – tenor saxophone, backing vocals; David Mann – tenor saxophone; Stephen "Doc" Kupka – baritone saxophone, backing vocals; Bill Churchville – trumpet, trombone, backing vocals; Barry Danelian – trumpet, flugelhorn	Brent Carter – lead and backing vocals; Carmen Grillo – guitar, backing vocals; Francis Rocco Prestia – bass; Nick Milo – keyboards, backing vocals; Herman Matthews – drums, percussion	Souled Out (1995)
1996–1997	Emilio Castillo – tenor saxophone, backing vocals; John Scarpulla – tenor saxophone; Stephen "Doc" Kupka – baritone saxophone, backing vocals; Bill Churchville – trumpet, trombone, backing vocals; Barry Danelian – trumpet, flugelhorn	Brent Carter – lead and backing vocals; Carmen Grillo – guitar, backing vocals; Francis Rocco Prestia – bass; Nick Milo – keyboards, backing vocals; Herman Matthews – drums, percussion	none
Early – June 1997	Emilio Castillo – tenor saxophone, backing vocals; John Scarpulla – tenor saxophone; Stephen "Doc" Kupka – baritone saxophone, backing vocals; Bill Churchville – trumpet, trombone, backing vocals; Barry Danelian – trumpet, flugelhorn	Brent Carter – lead and backing vocals; Jeff Tamelier – guitar, backing vocals; Francis Rocco Prestia – bass; Nick Milo – keyboards, backing vocals; Herman Matthews – drums, percussion	Rhythm & Business (1997)
June – December 1997	Emilio Castillo – tenor saxophone, backing vocals; John Scarpulla – tenor saxophone; Stephen "Doc" Kupka – baritone saxophone, backing vocals; Bill Churchville – trumpet, trombone, backing vocals; Don Harris – trumpet, flugelhorn	Brent Carter – lead and backing vocals; Jeff Tamelier – guitar, backing vocals; Francis Rocco Prestia – bass; Nick Milo – keyboards, backing vocals; Herman Matthews – drums, percussion	none
February – late 1998	Emilio Castillo – tenor saxophone, backing vocals; Norbert Stachel – tenor saxophone, flute; Stephen "Doc" Kupka – baritone saxophone, backing vocals; Bill Churchville – trumpet, trombone, backing vocals; Jesse McGuire – trumpet, backing vocals	Brent Carter – lead and backing vocals; Jeff Tamelier – guitar, backing vocals; Francis Rocco Prestia – bass; Nick Milo – keyboards, backing vocals; David Garibaldi – drums, percussion, vocals	Soul Vaccination (1999)
Late 1998 – February 2000	Emilio Castillo – tenor saxophone, backing vocals; Norbert Stachel – tenor saxophone, flute; Stephen "Doc" Kupka – baritone saxophone, backing vocals; Bill Churchville – trumpet, trombone, backing vocals; Jesse McGuire – trumpet, backing vocals	Brent Carter – lead and backing vocals; Jeff Tamelier – guitar, backing vocals; Francis Rocco Prestia – bass; Roger Smith – keyboards, backing vocals; David Garibaldi – drums, percussion, vocals	none
February – July 2000	Emilio Castillo – tenor saxophone, backing vocals; Norbert Stachel – tenor saxophone, flute; Stephen "Doc" Kupka – baritone saxophone, backing vocals; Bill Churchville – trumpet, trombone, backing vocals; Mike Bogart – trumpet, flugelhorn, trombone	Brent Carter – lead and backing vocals; Jeff Tamelier – guitar, backing vocals; Francis Rocco Prestia – bass; Roger Smith – keyboards, backing vocals; David Garibaldi – drums, percussion, vocals	none
July – November 2000	Emilio Castillo – tenor saxophone, backing vocals; Norbert Stachel – tenor saxophone, flute; Stephen "Doc" Kupka – baritone saxophone, backing vocals; Mike Bogart – trumpet, flugelhorn, trombone; Adolfo Acosta – trumpet, flugelhorn, vocals	Brent Carter – lead and backing vocals; Jeff Tamelier – guitar, backing vocals; Francis Rocco Prestia – bass; Roger Smith – keyboards, backing vocals; David Garibaldi – drums, percussion, vocals	none
November 2000 – January 2002	Emilio Castillo – tenor saxophone, backing vocals; Norbert Stachel – tenor saxophone, flute; Stephen "Doc" Kupka – baritone saxophone, backing vocals; Mike Bogart – trumpet, flugelhorn, trombone; Adolfo Acosta – trumpet, flugelhorn, vocals	Larry Braggs – lead and backing vocals; Jeff Tamelier – guitar, backing vocals; Francis Rocco Prestia – bass; Roger Smith – keyboards, backing vocals; David Garibaldi – drums, percussion, vocals	none
March 2002 – early 2006	Emilio Castillo – tenor saxophone, backing vocals; Tom E. Politzer – tenor saxophone, flute, vocals; Stephen "Doc" Kupka – baritone saxophone, backing vocals; Mike Bogart – trumpet, flugelhorn, trombone; Adolfo Acosta – trumpet, flugelhorn, vocals	Larry Braggs – lead and backing vocals; Jeff Tamelier – guitar, backing vocals; Francis Rocco Prestia – bass; Roger Smith – keyboards, backing vocals; David Garibaldi – drums, percussion, vocals	Oakland Zone (2003)
Spring 2006	Emilio Castillo – tenor saxophone, backing vocals; Tom E. Politzer – tenor saxophone, flute, vocals; Stephen "Doc" Kupka – baritone saxophone, backing vocals; Mike Bogart – trumpet, flugelhorn, trombone; Adolfo Acosta – trumpet, flugelhorn, vocals	Larry Braggs – lead and backing vocals; Trey Stone – guitar; Francis Rocco Prestia – bass; Roger Smith – keyboards, backing vocals; David Garibaldi – drums, percussion, vocals	none
June 2006 – early 2007	Emilio Castillo – tenor saxophone, backing vocals; Tom E. Politzer – tenor saxophone, flute, vocals; Stephen "Doc" Kupka – baritone saxophone, backing vocals; Mike Bogart – trumpet, flugelhorn, trombone; Adolfo Acosta – trumpet, flugelhorn, vocals	Larry Braggs – lead and backing vocals; Bruce Conte – guitar, backing vocals; Francis Rocco Prestia – bass; Roger Smith – keyboards, backing vocals; David Garibaldi – drums, percussion, vocals	Great American Soulbook (2009)
Early – late 2007	Emilio Castillo – tenor saxophone, backing vocals; Tom E. Politzer – tenor saxophone, flute, vocals; Stephen "Doc" Kupka – baritone saxophone, backing vocals; Mike Bogart – trumpet, flugelhorn, trombone; Adolfo Acosta – trumpet, flugelhorn, vocals	Larry Braggs – lead and backing vocals; Charles Spikes – guitar; Francis Rocco Prestia – bass; Roger Smith – keyboards, backing vocals; David Garibaldi – drums, percussion, vocals	none
Late 2007 – August 2009	Emilio Castillo – tenor saxophone, backing vocals; Tom E. Politzer – tenor saxophone, flute, vocals; Stephen "Doc" Kupka – baritone saxophone, backing vocals; Mike Bogart – trumpet, flugelhorn, trombone; Adolfo Acosta – trumpet, flugelhorn, vocals	Larry Braggs – lead and backing vocals; Mark Harper – guitar; Francis Rocco Prestia – bass; Roger Smith – keyboards, backing vocals; David Garibaldi – drums, percussion, vocals	Great American Soulbook (2009); 40th Anniversary (2011)
August 2009 – January 2010	Emilio Castillo – tenor saxophone, backing vocals; Tom E. Politzer – tenor saxophone, flute, vocals; Stephen "Doc" Kupka – baritone saxophone, backing vocals; Adolfo Acosta – trumpet, flugelhorn, vocals; Mic Gillette – trumpet, trombone, backing vocals	Larry Braggs – lead and backing vocals; Mark Harper – guitar; Francis Rocco Prestia – bass; Roger Smith – keyboards, backing vocals; David Garibaldi – drums, percussion, vocals	none
January 2010 – February 2011	Emilio Castillo – tenor saxophone, backing vocals; Tom E. Politzer – tenor saxophone, flute, vocals; Stephen "Doc" Kupka – baritone saxophone, backing vocals; Adolfo Acosta – trumpet, flugelhorn, vocals; Mic Gillette – trumpet, trombone, backing vocals	Larry Braggs – lead and backing vocals; Jerry Cortez – guitar, backing vocals; Francis Rocco Prestia – bass; Roger Smith – keyboards, backing vocals; David Garibaldi – drums, percussion, vocals	none
February – August 2011	Emilio Castillo – tenor saxophone, backing vocals; Tom E. Politzer – tenor saxophone, flute, vocals; Stephen "Doc" Kupka – baritone saxophone, backing vocals; Adolfo Acosta – trumpet, flugelhorn, vocals; Lee Thornburg – trumpet, trombone, vocals	Larry Braggs – lead and backing vocals; Jerry Cortez – guitar, backing vocals; Francis Rocco Prestia – bass; Roger Smith – keyboards, backing vocals; David Garibaldi – drums, percussion, vocals	none
August 2011 – December 2013	Emilio Castillo – tenor saxophone, backing vocals; Tom E. Politzer – tenor saxophone, flute, vocals; Stephen "Doc" Kupka – baritone saxophone, backing vocals; Adolfo Acosta – trumpet, flugelhorn, vocals; Sal Cracchiolo – trumpet, flugelhorn, vocals	Larry Braggs – lead and backing vocals; Jerry Cortez – guitar, backing vocals; Francis Rocco Prestia – bass; Roger Smith – keyboards, backing vocals; David Garibaldi – drums, percussion, vocals	none
December 2013 – February 2016	Emilio Castillo – tenor saxophone, backing vocals; Tom E. Politzer – tenor saxophone, flute, vocals; Stephen "Doc" Kupka – baritone saxophone, backing vocals; Adolfo Acosta – trumpet, flugelhorn, vocals; Sal Cracchiolo – trumpet, flugelhorn, vocals	Ray Greene – lead vocals, trombone; Jerry Cortez – guitar, backing vocals; Francis Rocco Prestia – bass; Roger Smith – keyboards, backing vocals; David Garibaldi – drums, percussion, vocals	Soul Side of Town (2018) – select tracks; Step Up (2020) – select tracks
April 2016 – June 2018	Emilio Castillo – tenor saxophone, backing vocals; Tom E. Politzer – tenor saxophone, flute, vocals; Stephen "Doc" Kupka – baritone saxophone, backing vocals; Adolfo Acosta – trumpet, flugelhorn, vocals; Sal Cracchiolo – trumpet, flugelhorn, vocals	Marcus Scott – lead and backing vocals; Jerry Cortez – guitar, backing vocals; Francis Rocco Prestia – bass; Roger Smith – keyboards, backing vocals; David Garibaldi – drums, percussion, vocals	Soul Side of Town (2018) – select tracks; Step Up (2020) – select tracks
June 2018 – December 2020	Emilio Castillo – tenor saxophone, backing vocals; Tom E. Politzer – tenor saxophone, flute, vocals; Stephen "Doc" Kupka – baritone saxophone, backing vocals; Adolfo Acosta – trumpet, flugelhorn, vocals; Sal Cracchiolo – trumpet, flugelhorn, vocals; alan Chez lead trumpet , vocals	Marcus Scott – lead and backing vocals; Jerry Cortez – guitar, backing vocals; Marc van Wageningen – bass; Roger Smith – keyboards, backing vocals; David Garibaldi – drums, percussion, vocals	50 Years of Funk & Soul (2021)
2021	Emilio Castillo – tenor saxophone, backing vocals; Tom E. Politzer – tenor saxophone, flute, vocals; Stephen "Doc" Kupka – baritone saxophone, backing vocals; Adolfo Acosta – trumpet, flugelhorn, vocals; Harry Kim – trumpet, flugelhorn	Ray Greene – lead vocals, trombone; Jerry Cortez – guitar, backing vocals; Marc van Wageningen – bass; Roger Smith – keyboards, backing vocals; David Garibaldi – drums, percussion, vocals	none
2022 – July 2023	Emilio Castillo – tenor saxophone, backing vocals; Tom E. Politzer – tenor saxophone, flute, vocals; Stephen "Doc" Kupka – baritone saxophone, backing vocals; Adolfo Acosta – trumpet, flugelhorn, vocals; Mike Bogart – trumpet, flugelhorn	Mike Jerel – lead vocals; Jerry Cortez – guitar, backing vocals; Marc van Wageningen – bass; Roger Smith – keyboards, backing vocals; David Garibaldi – drums, percussion, vocals	none
July 2023 – February 2024	Emilio Castillo – tenor saxophone, backing vocals; Tom E. Politzer – tenor saxophone, flute, vocals; Stephen "Doc" Kupka – baritone saxophone, backing vocals; Adolfo Acosta – trumpet, flugelhorn, vocals; Dave Richards – trumpet, flugelhorn	Mike Jerel – lead vocals; Jerry Cortez – guitar, backing vocals; Marc van Wageningen – bass; Roger Smith – keyboards, backing vocals; David Garibaldi – drums, percussion, vocals	none
February 2024 – January 2025	Emilio Castillo – tenor saxophone, backing vocals; Tom E. Politzer – tenor saxophone, flute, vocals; Stephen "Doc" Kupka – baritone saxophone, backing vocals; Adolfo Acosta – trumpet, flugelhorn, vocals; Dave Richards – trumpet, flugelhorn	Jordan John – lead vocals; Jerry Cortez – guitar, backing vocals; Marc van Wageningen – bass; Roger Smith – keyboards, backing vocals; Pete Antunes – drums, percussion	none
January 2025 – present	Emilio Castillo – tenor saxophone, backing vocals; Tom E. Politzer – tenor saxophone, flute, vocals; Stephen "Doc" Kupka – baritone saxophone, backing vocals; Adolfo Acosta – trumpet, flugelhorn, vocals; Dave Richards – trumpet, flugelhorn	Jordan John – lead vocals; Jerry Cortez – guitar, backing vocals; Marc van Wageningen – bass; Mike Jerel – keyboards, backing vocals; Pete Antunes – drums, percussion	none to date
