= Rhythm & Business =

Studio album by Tower of Power
- Released: 1997
- Length: 66:41
- Label: Epic
- Producer: Emilio Castillo

Tower of Power chronology
| Souled Out (1995) | Rhythm & Business (1997) | Direct Plus (1997) |

Rhythm and Business is an album by the American band Tower of Power. It was released in 1997. The band promoted the album by playing the Red Sea Jazz Festival, among other concert dates.

== Production ==
The album was produced by bandmember Emilio Castillo. The band had decided not to chase any kind of market trend, and instead record what it wanted. Castillo, Stephen Kupka, and Frances Rocco Prestia were the only founding members who played on Rhythm & Business. The title track is about the state of 1990s R&B and the music industry.

== Critical reception ==
Professional ratings
Review scores
| Source | Rating |
|---|---|
| AllMusic | 2.5/5 stars |
| The Encyclopedia of Popular Music | 3/5 stars |
| Los Angeles Daily News | 3/4 stars |
| MusicHound Rock: The Essential Album Guide | 2.5/5 stars |

The Boston Globe wrote that "the implausibly soulful baritone sax of Stephen 'Doc' Kupka, Castillo's partner since 1969, is highlighted on 'Spank-A-Dang' and 'East Bay Way'." The Los Angeles Daily News noted that "Tower of Power has never lost the ability to turn up the heat on slippery funk grooves and soulful ballads."

The Blade deemed the album "plain old funk and soul," writing that, "at times, it's like listening in on a jam session as the horns blare and the drums pound." The Sunday News called it "a funky soul assembly of churning Hammond organ, snappy chicken-scratch rhythm guitar, ear-bending wah-wah guitar, high-powered thumb-popping funk bass, soaring gospel-tinged soul singing and those nasty, legendary, extraordinary Tower of Power horns." Christina Cole, of the Anchorage Daily News, listed the album among the best of 1997.

AllMusic wrote that "these guys know all there is to know about R&B and on Rhythm & Business they combine their musical passion, knowledge and abilities into that one-of-a-kind Tower of Power sound."

== Track listing ==
| No. | Title | Length |
|---|---|---|
| 1. | "So I Got to Groove (Stephen Kupka, Emilio Castillo, Herman Matthews)" | 5:44 |
| 2. | "Crazy for You (Marlon McClain, Kupka, Castillo)" | 4:37 |
| 3. | "East Bay Way (Kupka, Castillo, Jeff Tamelier)" | 4:48 |
| 4. | "Unconditional Love (McClain, Kupka, Castillo, Nate Phillips, Wayne Jackson)" | 6:58 |
| 5. | "You Do the Math (Kupka, Tamelier, Jim Pugh)" | 4:47 |
| 6. | "The More You Know (Kupka, Castillo)" | 5:49 |
| 7. | "Recapture the Magic (Kupka, Castillo)" | 5:33 |
| 8. | "What's Your Trip (McClain, Kupka, Castillo)" | 5:40 |
| 9. | "Rhythm and Business (Kupka, Castillo, Matthews, Michael Caplan)" | 4:08 |
| 10. | "Don't Knock Me Down (Kupka, Castillo, Ken Kessie)" | 3:40 |
| 11. | "That Was Then and This Is Now (Kupka, Castillo, Nick Milo)" | 4:35 |
| 12. | "It Really Doesn't Matter (Castillo, Tony Flores)" | 4:35 |
| 13. | "Spank-a-Dang (Matthews, Milo)" | 5:44 |
