= Power (Tower of Power album) =

Studio album by Tower of Power
- Released: 1986 (Europe); 1987 (US)
- Recorded: 1986
- Studio: The Complex (Los Angeles, California)
- Genre: Soul, funk
- Label: Cypress Records (US); Genlyd Records (Europe)
- Producer: Emilio Castillo

Tower of Power chronology
Direct (1981)	Power (1986)	Monster on a Leash (1991)

Power is a studio album by Tower of Power released in 1987 on the A&M Records-distributed Cypress Records label. It was released a year earlier with additional and/or different songs in Europe under the title T.O.P. (not to be confused with their 1993 album of the same name). This was the only album to feature vocalist Ellis Hall, a protégé of Ray Charles, who also plays keyboards and rhythm guitar. Hall was unique to TOP as he is thus far the only blind lead vocalist of the group. It also marked the final departure of original guitarist Willie Fulton, and the return of original bassist Francis "Rocco" Prestia. It also marks the debut of trumpeter Lee Thornburg, saxophonist Richard Elliot, and drummer Mick Mestek.

== Track listing ==
=== US Version ===
SIDE ONE

1. "Baby's Got the Power" (Ellis Hall Jr., Greg Adams, Billy Kent) - 3:06
2. "Credit" (Stephen "Doc" Kupka) - 4:06
3. "Some Days Were Meant for Rain" (Hall) - 4:52
4. "Boys Night Out" (Hall) - 5:46

SIDE TWO

1. "Ball and Chain" (Max Carl) - 3:18
2. "Through Lovers' Eyes" (Joe Curiale, Hall, Pamela Phillips Oland) - 3:39
3. "Count On Me" (André Pessis, Kevin Wells) - 3:24
4. "On the One"* (Hall) - 3:58
5. "Up Against Yourself"* (Hall) - 3:16

=== European Version as T.O.P. ===
SIDE ONE

1. "Baby's Got the Power" - 3:06
2. "Ball and Chain" - 3:18
3. "Heartbreak in the Makin'"** (Ned Doheny, Robben Ford) - 4:15
4. "You Ought to Be Havin' Fun" (1986 Version)** (Emilio Castillo, Stephen "Doc" Kupka, Hubert Tubbs) - 3:22
5. "Boys Night Out" - 5:46

SIDE TWO

1. "Credit" - 4:06
2. "Through Lovers' Eyes" - 3:39
3. "Some Days Were Meant for Rain" - 4:52
4. "Doggin' at the Cathouse"** (Emilio Castillo, Stephen "Doc" Kupka) - 3:25
5. "Count On Me" - 3:24

(*) US Version only
(**) European Version only

== Trivia ==
"Credit" was one of the songs from the Dinosaur Tracks sessions. T.O.P. re-recorded it for this album. Also on the European version, they re-record their 1976 song "You Ought to Be Havin' Fun" which was originally released on Ain't Nothin' Stoppin' Us Now.

== Personnel ==
Tower of Power

- Ellis Hall – lead vocals (1, 2, 3, 6, 7), keyboards, rhythm guitar, lead guitar (8), rhythm arrangements (8, 9)
- Willie Fulton – lead guitar, backing vocals
- Rocco Prestia – bass
- Mick Mestek – drums
- Richard Elliot – alto saxophone, tenor saxophone, Lyricon
- Emilio Castillo – tenor saxophone, backing vocals
- Stephen "Doc" Kupka – baritone saxophone
- Greg Adams – trumpet, flugelhorn, backing vocals, horn arrangements, string arrangements
- Lee Thornburg – trumpet, flugelhorn, backing vocals, lead vocals (5)

Additional musicians

- Stanley Benders – percussion on "On The One"
- Maxayn Lewis, Marilyn Scott and Patty Unatis – backing vocals on "On The One"

== Production ==
- Tim MacDonaugh – executive producer
- Gene Vano – executive producer
- Emilio Castillo – producer
- Ellis Hall – co-producer
- Ron Pendragon – engineer, mixing (1, 4−9)
- Sharon Rice – second engineer
- Duane Seykora – second engineer
- George Massenburg – mixing (2, 3)
- Doug Sax – mastering at The Mastering Lab (Hollywood, California)
- Linda Larson – production assistant
- Leslie Winter – art direction, design
- Stuart Watson – front cover photography
- Jan Jul – back cover photography
