= Soul Vaccination: Tower of Power Live =

Live album by Tower of Power
- Released: 1999
- Recorded: October 8 & 10, 1998
- Venue: The Fillmore, San Francisco and Fox Theatre, Stockton, California
- Genre: Soul, funk
- Length: 71:32
- Label: 550 Music/Epic
- Producer: Emilio Castillo

Tower of Power chronology
Rhythm & Business (1997)	Soul Vaccination: Tower of Power Live (1999)	Oakland Zone (2003)

Soul Vaccination: Tower of Power Live is the second live album by the soul/funk group Tower of Power. It was recorded live in California during their 1998 world tour at two venues: The Fillmore in San Francisco and the Fox Theatre in Stockton.

== Track listing ==
All tracks composed by Emilio Castillo and Stephen Kupka

1. "Soul with a Capital 'S'" - 5:04
2. "I Like Your Style" (Castillo, Kupka, Nick Milo) - 3:42
3. "Soul Vaccination" - 4:56
4. "Down to the Night Club (Bump City)" (Castillo, Kupka, David Garibaldi) - 3:14
5. "Willing to Learn" - 6:06
6. "Souled Out" (Castillo, Kupka, Marlon McClain) - 4:58
7. "Diggin' on James Brown" (Castillo, Kupka, Ken Kessie) - 4:53
8. "(To Say the Least) You're the Most" (Johnny Guitar Watson, Larry Williams) - 4:33
9. "You Strike My Main Nerve" (Castillo, Kupka, Lenny Williams, Louis Gordon) - 3:55
10. "Can't You See (Your Doin' Me Wrong)" (Castillo, Kupka, Lenny Williams) - 3:26
11. "You Got to Funkifize" - 4:46
12. "So Very Hard to Go" - 3:49
13. "What Is Hip?" (Castillo, Kupka, David Garibaldi) - 6:01
14. "You're Still a Young Man" - 5:59
15. "So I Got to Groove" (Castillo, Kupka, Herman Matthews) - 6:08
16. "Way Down To The Ground" - 4:35

== Personnel ==
Tower of Power

- Brent Carter – lead vocals (1, 2, 3, 5, 6, 8, 9, 10, 12−15)
- Nick Milo – keyboards, backing vocals
- Jeff Tamelier – guitars, backing vocals, co-lead vocals (4)
- Francis Rocco Prestia – bass
- David Garibaldi – drums
- Stephen "Doc" Kupka – baritone saxophone
- Norbert Stachel – lead tenor saxophone, all tenor sax solos
- Emilio Castillo – tenor saxophone, backing vocals, lead vocals (4, 7, 11)
- Bill Churchville – trumpet, flugelhorn, lead trumpet (5, 10, 11), flugelhorn solo (12), trumpet solo (13), backing vocals
- Jesse McGuire – lead trumpet, trumpet solo (5, 9), backing vocals, band introduction

Horn arrangements

- Greg Adams (1−4, 6, 8−14)
- Barry Danielian (5, 7)
- David Mann (5, 7)
- Dave Eskridge (15)

== Production ==
- Emilio Castillo – producer
- Biff Dawes – recording (1, 3, 4, 5, 7, 8, 11−15)
- Tom Flye – recording (2, 6, 9, 10)
- Clarke Rigsby – additional recording, mixing
- Doug Field – recording assistant (1, 3, 4, 5, 7, 8, 11−15)
- Phil Kneebone – recording assistant (1, 3, 4, 5, 7, 8, 11−15)
- Chuck Orozcko – recording assistant (2, 6, 9, 10)
- Scott Peets – recording assistant (2, 6, 9, 10)
- Vlado Meller – mastering at Sony Music Studios (New York City, New York)
- Michael Caplan – A&R
- Ari Kast – packaging manager
- Josh Cheuse – design
- Joe Newton – illustrations
- Eric Camden – photography
- Bret Lopez – photography
- Stephen Moore – production director
- Jack Hylan – tour manager
- Louis Lind – tour manager
- Gerald McCarthy – stage crew, setup
- Nico Vonk – monitor mix engineer
