= We Came to Play! =

Studio album by Tower of Power
- Released: 1978
- Studios: Cherokee (Hollywood, California)
- Genres: Soul, funk
- Length: 38:40
- Label: Columbia
- Producer: Steve Cropper

Tower of Power chronology
Ain't Nothin' Stoppin' Us Now (1976)	We Came to Play! (1978)	Back on the Streets (1979)

We Came to Play! is an album by the American band Tower of Power, released in 1978. It marked the debut of singer Michael Jeffries, who would stay with T.O.P. through the mid-1980s. Steve Cropper produced the album. It peaked at No. 89 on the Billboard 200.

We Came to Play! features Victor Conte, the future founder of the controversial BALCO, on bass, and who is also the cousin of band guitarist Bruce Conte. Drummer Ron Beck takes a lead vocal spot on "Love Bug", which features founding T.O.P. drummer David Garibaldi on second drums. Garibaldi would return to the band on the next album, but neither Conte, Bruce or Victor, would after this album.

== Critical reception ==
Professional ratings
Review scores
Source	Rating
AllMusic	1/5 stars
The Encyclopedia of Popular Music	3/5 stars
The Rolling Stone Album Guide	2.5/5 stars

The Globe and Mail noted that "the band has traded away some distinction in dispensing with the patented horn parts (above all else, one knew it was the Tower of Power Horns when they played), but it has gained style in both the up-tempo numbers in the ballad which will please mainstream listeners without losing the rhythmic punch that was their second most identifiable trademark."

== Track listing ==
1. "We Came to Play" (Emilio Castillo, Stephen "Doc" Kupka) - 3:38
2. "Lovin' You Is Gonna See Me Thru" (Clifford Coulter) - 6:04
3. "Let Me Touch You" (Victor Conte, Chester Thompson, S. Beck, Ron E. Beck, Edward McGee) - 4:33
4. "Yin-Yang Thang" (Emilio Castillo, Stephen "Doc" Kupka) - 4:23
5. "Share My Life" (Bruce Conte, Hubert Tubbs, Coleman Head) - 3:56
6. "Bittersweet Soul Music" (Rob Moitoza) - 3:28
7. "Am I a Fool" (Hubert Tubbs, Emilio Castillo, Stephen "Doc" Kupka) - 3:58
8. "Love Bug" (Ron E. Beck, Steve Cropper, Victor Conte, Chester Thompson) - 4:01
9. "Somewhere Down the Road" (Bruce Conte, Coleman Head) - 4:39

== Personnel ==
Tower of Power

- Michael Jeffries – lead vocals (1−7, 9)
- Chester Thompson – acoustic piano, Yamaha electric grand piano, Fender Rhodes, clavinet, ARP String Ensemble, Minimoog, Polymoog, organ, backing vocals
- Bruce Conte – guitars, backing vocals
- Victor Conte – bass
- Ronnie Beck – drums, backing vocals; lead vocals (8)
- Lenny Pickett – alto saxophone, first tenor saxophone, Lyricon, clarinet, contrabass clarinet, alto flute, bass flute, E-mu synthesizer; synth solo (9)
- Stephen "Doc" Kupka – baritone saxophone
- Emilio Castillo – second tenor saxophone, backing vocals
- Mic Gillette – trombone, bass trombone, trumpet, flugelhorn, backing vocals
- Greg Adams – trumpet, flugelhorn

Additional musicians

- Steve Cropper – additional guitars (2, 3, 6, 8, 9)
- David Garibaldi – additional drums (8)
- Gerald Vinci – concertmaster
- Clifford Coulter – backing vocals (2)
- Carol Rogers – backing vocals (5)
- Brooks Hunnicutt – backing vocals (6)
- Lisa Roberts – backing vocals (6)
- Karen Wright – backing vocals (6)
- Jim McCandless – bass backing vocals (8)

Production

- Steve Cropper – producer
- Alan Chinowsky – engineer, mixing
- Frank "Cheech" D'Amico – assistant engineer
- Steve Fontano – assistant engineer
- Alex Kashevaroff – assistant engineer
- Rick Sanchez – assistant engineer
- Vic Anesini – remastering at Sony Music Studios (New York City, New York)
- Tower of Power – art direction
- Bruce Steinberg – design, photography
