= Direct (Tower of Power album) =

Live album by Tower of Power
- Released: 1981
- Genres: Soul, funk
- Label: Sheffield Lab
- Producer: Larry Brown

Tower of Power chronology
Back on the Streets (1979)	Direct (1981)	Power (1987)

Professional ratings
Review scores
Source	Rating
AllMusic	1/5 stars

Direct is a 1981 live in-studio album by Tower of Power. It was their only album for the direct-to-disc record label Sheffield Lab. It also marked the return of original guitarist Willie James Fulton, not heard from since 1972's Bump City, and the last album to feature saxophonist Lenny Pickett. Mark Sanders plays drums on this album. Between this album and their 1987 comeback album Power, they would record the sessions that later became the Dinosaur Tracks CD. Besides that, save for the original single release of "Simple as That" (from the same Dinosaur Tracks sessions), this would be their last new release until 1987. It contained mostly songs from their previous albums, but included new material as well.

Direct would later be re-released with alternate takes on CD as Direct Plus! in 1997.

== Track listing ==
Side one

1. "Fanfare/And You Know It" (Greg Adams/Emilio Castillo, Stephen Kupka) originally recorded for Back on the Streets - 2:44
2. "You're Gonna Need Me" (Albert King) New track - 4:02
3. "Squib Cakes" (Chester Thompson) originally recorded for Back to Oakland - 7:34

Side two

1. "That's Why I Sing" (Chester Thompson) New track, later re-recorded during the Dinosaur Tracks sessions in 1983 - 4:57
2. "What Is Hip?" (Emilio Castillo, Stephen Kupka) originally recorded for Tower of Power - 4:40
3. "Never Let Go of Love" (Greg Levias, Hilary Thompson, Michael Jeffries) New track, later re-recorded during the Dinosaur Tracks sessions in 1983 - 4:06

== Personnel ==
- Michael Jeffries – lead vocals
- Chester Thompson – keyboards, arrangements (3, 4)
- Willie Fulton – guitars, lead vocals (2)
- Vito San Filippo – bass
- Mark Sanders – drums
- Victor Feldman – percussion
- Lenny Pickett – alto saxophone, tenor saxophone, saxophone solo (3, 6)
- Emilio Castillo – tenor saxophone
- Stephen "Doc" Kupka – baritone saxophone
- Mic Gillette – trombone, trumpet, flugelhorn
- Greg Adams – trumpet, flugelhorn, arrangements (1, 5, 6), flugelhorn solo (3), trumpet solo (5)
- Rick Waychesko – trumpet
- Jim Gilstrap – guest singer
- Edie Lehmann – guest singer
- Oren Waters – guest singer

Production

- Doug Sax – executive producer
- Lincoln Mayorga – executive producer
- Spencer Proffer – executive producer
- Larry Brown – producer, recording
- Mike Sanders – assistant engineer
- Tom Pessagno – technician
- Patricia Meredith – production coordinator
- Dave McDonald – production manager
- Tina Nichols – design, illustration
- Miguel – photography

Sheffield Lab credits

- Steve Haselton – chief engineer
- Andrew Teton – field chief technician
- Lincoln Mayorga – booth supervisor
- Dick Doss – disc processing
- Rick Goldman – disc processing
- Mike Reese – lathe operator
- Lois Walker – lathe operator
- Ed Hukoveh – lathe design
