= In the Slot =

Studio album by Tower of Power
- Released: September 1975
- Studios: Record Plant, Sausalito, CA
- Genres: Funk, soul, R&B
- Length: 38:20
- Label: Warner Bros.
- Producers: Emilio Castillo, Tower of Power

Tower of Power chronology
Urban Renewal (1975)	In the Slot (1975)	Live and in Living Color (1976)

Professional ratings
Review scores
Source	Rating
AllMusic	3/5 stars

In the Slot is a Tower of Power album released in 1975. It was their last studio album for Warner Bros. Records. It also marked the debut of new vocalist Hubert Tubbs. David Garibaldi returns to the drummer's throne after being absent from the previous album Urban Renewal (save for one track), although the drummer from that album, David Bartlett, does appear as a background vocalist on this album, as does Garibaldi's next successor, Ron Beck. "Ebony Jam" and "Drop It in the Slot" were sampled on the Beastie Boys' 1989 album Paul's Boutique.

== Track listing ==
LP side one

1. "Just Enough and Too Much" (Emilio Castillo, Stephen Kupka, Frank Biner) - 3:25
2. "Treat Me Like Your Man" (Lenny Williams, Emilio Castillo, Stephen "Doc" Kupka) - 3:08
3. "If I Play My Cards Right" (Frank Biner, Stephen "Doc" Kupka, Emilio Castillo) - 3:14
4. "As Surely as I Stand Here" (Stephen "Doc" Kupka, Chester Thompson, Emilio Castillo) - 5:17
5. "Fanfare: Matanuska" (Greg Adams) - 0:16
6. "On the Serious Side" (Emilio Castillo, Stephen "Doc" Kupka) - 2:54

LP side two

1. "Ebony Jam" (Chester Thompson) - 6:45
2. "You're So Wonderful, So Marvelous" (Frank Biner, Stephen "Doc" Kupka, Emilio Castillo) - 3:13
3. "Vuela por Noche" (David Garibaldi, Bruce Conte, Greg Adams, Francis Rocco Prestia) - 1:34
4. "Essence of Innocence" (Chester Thompson) - 0:35
5. "The Soul of a Child" (Stephen "Doc" Kupka, Bruce Conte, Emilio Castillo) - 4:56
6. "Drop It in the Slot" (Emilio Castillo, Stephen "Doc" Kupka) - 3:12

== Personnel ==
Tower of Power

- Hubert Tubbs – lead vocals
- Chester Thompson – acoustic piano, clavinet, organ, ARP String Ensemble, bass pedals, backing vocals, arrangements (1, 4, 7, 10)
- Bruce Conte – guitars, backing vocals
- Francis Rocco Prestia – bass guitar
- David Garibaldi – drums
- Lenny Pickett – clarinet, contrabass clarinet, flute, piccolo flute, Lyricon; alto and soprano saxophones, 1st tenor saxophone, all saxophone solos
- Stephen "Doc" Kupka – baritone saxophone
- Emilio Castillo – 2nd tenor saxophone, backing vocals, co-lead vocals (8)
- Mic Gillette – trombone, bass trombone, trumpet, piccolo trumpet, flugelhorn, backing vocals
- Greg Adams – trumpet (with solo on 9), flugelhorn (with solo on 7), arrangements (2, 3, 5−9, 11, 12), string arrangements and conductor
- Tower of Power – arrangements (1, 3, 6, 12)

Additional backing vocals

- Bootche Anderson, David Bartlett, Ron E. Beck, Frank Biner, Roger Rifkind, Marilyn Scott and Pepper Watkins

Production

- Emilio Castillo – producer
- Tower of Power – producers
- Alan Chinowsky – engineer
- Tom Flye – engineer
- Chris Morris – assistant engineer
- Bruce Steinberg – album design, photography
- Ellie Oberzil – design assistant
