= Back on the Streets (Tower of Power album) =

Studio album by Tower of Power
- Released: 1979
- Genres: Soul, funk
- Label: Columbia
- Producers: Michael McKinney, Richard Evans, Emilio Castillo

Tower of Power chronology
We Came to Play! (1978)	Back on the Streets (1979)	Direct (1981)

Professional ratings
Review scores
Source	Rating
AllMusic	1/5 stars
MusicHound Rock: The Essential Album Guide	3.5/5 stars
The Virgin Encyclopedia of R&B and Soul	3/5 stars

Back on the Streets is an album by the American band Tower of Power, released in 1979. It was their last album with Columbia Records. The title derives from the song "Back on the Streets Again" from their debut album East Bay Grease. David Garibaldi returns to the drummer's spot a third time, only to leave after this album, again. (He would not return again until 1998) It also marked the debut of bassist Vito San Filippo and guitarist Danny Hoefer. This would be Hoefer's only album as a member of Tower of Power.

Back on the Streets peaked at No. 106 on the Billboard 200.

== Track listing ==
1. "Rock Baby" (Crockett, Michael Jeffries) – 4:48
2. "Our Love" (Clifford Coulter, McGee) – 3:34
3. "Heaven Must Have Made You" (Geoffrey Leib) – 3:33
4. "And You Know It" (Emilio Castillo, Kupka) – 3:02
5. "Nowhere to Run" (Lamont Dozier, Eddie Holland, Brian Holland) – 4:35
6. "Something Calls Me" (Lenny Pickett) – 4:24
7. "It Takes Two (To Make It Happen)" (Emilio Castillo, David Garibaldi, Michael Jeffries, Thompson) – 3:37
8. "In Due Time" (duet with Cheryl Lynn) (Crockett, Jeffries) – 4:10
9. "Just Make a Move (And Be Yourself)" (Thompson) – 5:10

== Personnel ==
Tower of Power

- Michael Jeffries – lead and backing vocals
- Chester Thompson – acoustic piano, Fender Rhodes, clavinet, Minimoog, backing vocals; organ (solo on track 9), horn arrangements (1, 5, 7, 8, 9), string arrangements (7)
- Danny Hoefer – guitars (solo on track 4)
- Vito San Filippo – bass, backing vocals
- David Garibaldi – drums, Syndrums
- Emilio Castillo – tenor saxophone, backing vocals
- Lenny Pickett – synthesizers, backing vocals, alto saxophone, soprano saxophone; tenor saxophone (solo on track 5), horn arrangements (6)
- Stephen "Doc" Kupka – baritone saxophone, backing vocals
- Mic Gillette – trombone, bass trombone, trumpet, flugelhorn, piccolo trumpet, backing vocals
- Greg Adams – trumpet, flugelhorn, backing vocals; horn arrangements (2, 4)

Additional musicians

- Greg Crockett – guitars (8)
- Paulinho da Costa – percussion (1, 5)
- Eddie "Bongo" Brown – percussion (2, 5)
- Bill Lamb – brass (1, 2, 3, 5)
- Gayle Levant – harp (3)
- Tower of Power – rhythm arrangements (1, 2, 3, 5)
- McKinley Jackson – rhythm arrangements (1, 2, 3, 5), horn arrangements (3), string arrangements (3)
- Richard Evans – string arrangements (8)
- Harry Bluestone – concertmaster (2, 3)
- Sol Bobrov – concertmaster (7, 8)
- The Jones Girls – backing vocals (1, 2, 3, 5)
- Cheryl Lynn – lead vocals (8)

Production

- Emilio Castillo – producer, mixing supervisor
- McKinley Jackson – producer (1, 2, 3, 5)
- Richard Evans – producer (4, 6−9)
- Tower of Power – co-producers
- Alan Chinowsky – engineer, mixing
- Jim Gaines – engineer, mixing
- Paul Serrano – engineer
- Michael Stone – mixing
- Steve Fontano – assistant engineer
- Phil Jamtaas – assistant engineer
- Rick Sanchez – assistant engineer
- John Golden – original mastering
- Vic Anesini – 1993 digital remastering
- Bruce Steinberg – art direction, design, photography
- Steve Zeifman – color printing

Studios

- Recorded at Record Plant, Los Angeles (California); Record Plant, Sausalito (California); United Western Recorders (Hollywood, California); Universal Recording Studio and P.S. Recording Studios (Chicago, Illinois).
- Mixed at Record Plant, Los Angeles, and Record Plant, Sausalito.
- Mastered at Kendun Recorders (Burbank, California).
- Remastered at Sony Music Studios (New York City, New York).
