= Monster on a Leash =

Studio album by Tower of Power
- Released: 1991
- Studios: Schnee and Hollywood Sound (Hollywood, California).
- Genres: Soul, funk
- Length: 57:55
- Label: Epic
- Producer: Emilio Castillo

Tower of Power chronology
Power (1987)	Monster on a Leash (1991)	T.O.P. (1993)

Monster on a Leash is an album by the American band Tower of Power, released in 1991. It peaked at No. 19 on Billboard's Contemporary Jazz Albums chart.

== Production ==
Huey Lewis cowrote "How Could This Happen to Me" and "Keep Your Monster on a Leash". Tower of Power employed a 10-member lineup for the recording of the album.

== Critical reception ==
Professional ratings
Review scores
Source	Rating
AllMusic	3/5 stars
Chicago Tribune	2.5/4 stars

The Baltimore Sun wrote that "it's not the band's brassy bluster that makes it worth hearing, but the rhythm section's refried soul grooves." The Washington Post opined that "except for a few tracks ... the combination of Tom Bowes's rather generic R&B vocals and some uninspired lyrics is sorely outclassed by the group's surging horn arrangements and incessant dance grooves."

== Track listing ==
All songs written by Emilio Castillo and Stephen "Doc" Kupka unless otherwise noted.

1. "A Little Knowledge (Is a Dangerous Thing)" - 4:24 (Castillo, Dana Meyers, Milo, Zeke Zirngiebel)
2. "How Could This Happen to Me" - 4:10
3. "Who Do You Think You Are" - 4:22 (Bobbie Candler, Grillo, Greg Mathieson, Danny Seidenberg)
4. "Attitude Dance" - 5:36
5. "You Can't Fall Up (You Just Fall Down)" - 4:55 (Castillo, Skip Knape, Kupka)
6. "Funk the Dumb Stuff" - 5:27
7. "Believe It" - 4:35 (Adams, Castillo, Prestia)
8. "Personal Possessions" - 5:06 (Troy Dexter, Grillo)
9. "Miss Trouble (Got a Lot of Nerve)" - 4:45 (Castillo, Kupka, David Woodford)
10. "Keep Your Monster on a Leash" - 4:33 (Castillo, Kupka, Tim Scott, Huey Lewis)
11. "Someone New" - 4:28 (Adams)
12. "Mr. Toad's Wild Ride" - 5:26 (Milo)

== Personnel ==
- Tom Bowes – lead vocals
- Nick Milo – keyboards
- Carmen Grillo – guitars, backing vocals
- Rocco Prestia – bass
- Russ McKinnon – drums, percussion
- Steve Grove – alto saxophone, tenor saxophone
- Emilio Castillo – tenor saxophone, backing vocals, lead vocals (6)
- Stephen 'Doc' Kupka – baritone saxophone
- Lee Thornburg – trombone, trumpet, flugelhorn, backing vocals, lead vocals (10)
- Greg Adams – trumpet, flugelhorn, backing vocals, horn and string arrangements

Production

- Emilio Castillo – producer
- Al Schmitt – recording, mixing
- Bob Loftus – assistant engineer
- Chris Rich – assistant engineer
- Doug Sax – mastering at The Mastering Lab (Hollywood, California)
- Michael Caplan – A&R
- Maureen Droney – production coordinator
- Jerry Manuel – production manager
- David Coleman – art direction
- Nancy Donald – art direction
- David Michalek – photography
