= Ellis Hall (musician) =

American singer-songwriter (born 1951)

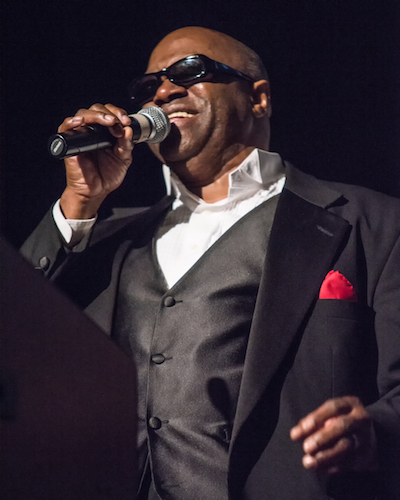
- Ellis Hall performing Soul Unlimited in 2017
- Born: Ellis Hall Jr. May 10, 1951 (age 75); Savannah, Georgia, U.S.
- Occupations: Singer; Songwriter; Composer; Multi-instrumentalist; Actor
- Years active: 1967–present
- Spouses: Susan Hancock (m. 1973; div. 1983); Ruth Ann Capone (m. 1987; div. 1992); Karen Murphy (m. 1994; died 2007); Leighala Jimenez (m. 2013)
- Children: Four
- Musical career
- Genres: Soul; rhythm & blues; jazz; funk; gospel; rock; blues
- Instruments: Vocals; keyboards; drums; guitar; bass
- Labels: CBS; Columbia; HCRC Records; Cypress/A&M Records; Crossover Records; Ear-Say Records; Priority
- Website: ellishall.com

Ellis Hall Jr. (born May 10, 1951, in Savannah, Georgia) known professionally as Ellis Hall is an American singer-songwriter, multi-instrumentalist, actor and composer. He was described as "The Ambassador of Soul" by conductor, Jeff Tyzik. Hall has been blind since the age of 18. Citing Ray Charles as his inspiration, Hall has written over 4000 soul, gospel, blues and pop songs, and has performed with Stevie Wonder, James Taylor, Natalie Cole, Patti LaBelle, Toby Keith, Herbie Hancock, George Benson, Bobby Womack, Sheila E, Maurice White of Earth, Wind and Fire, Tower of Power and Ray Charles. Charles signed Hall to his record label Crossover Records, and mentored him until Charles' death in 2004.

== Early life and education ==
Hall was born on May 10, 1951, in Savannah, Georgia, the son of Ellis Hall Sr. and Arvanna Harris. He and his brothers and sisters were raised in his parents' Southern Baptist household in Claxton, Georgia. Hall was diagnosed with congenital glaucoma at an early age. With only partial and deteriorating vision in his left eye, he was declared legally blind and the family moved to Boston, Massachusetts, to allow him to attend The Perkins School for the Blind in Watertown. He began piano lessons in the third grade and caught the performing bug singing doo-wop by the corner store where he would take the money he earned singing and buy chips and soda. He really got serious about having a career in music at the age of 14, when he caught a performance of the B3 organ quartet Quint Harris & the Preachers at Jim Nance's Lounge in Boston and witnessed how they whipped the audience into a frenzy. After that show, Hall built his own drum kit so he could start playing drums and he added the bass to his instrument practice lineup. Ever mindful of his fate, he would practice all of his instruments in the dark so he would always be able to play them, with or without his vision. While in high school, he played football and competed in wrestling with his left eye remaining strong enough to manage, however, a wrestling injury to that left eye would take away his sight completely in 1969, at the age of 18.

== Music career ==
Due to his extensive musical education while in school, Hall eventually mastered the drums, piano, keyboards, guitar, upright and electric bass. He was able to develop and define himself as a vocalist as well, possessing a five-octave range. Hall's first professional recording was for rocker Paul Pena on Capitol Records in 1971, playing bass and singing background vocals on his single "The River", "Adorable One" and "Woke Up This Morning". His first release as a solo artist was a version of the Motown song from the 1960s, "Every Little Bit Hurts". In 1973, he formed the Ellis Hall Group. The Ellis Hall Group was managed by Don Rosenberg and featured a rotating roster of members including: Ellis Hall (founder), Stanley Benders (percussion), David Fuller (drums), Michael Thompson (guitar), Freddie Mueller (bass/sound), Tony Vaughn (bass), Jeffrey Lockhart (guitar), Patti Unitas (vocals), Pat Thomason (vocals), Buddy Baptista (drums), Richie Marshall (drums) and Jackie Baird III (guitar). Their first gig was opening for Earth, Wind and Fire on the Boston stop of their 1974 tour. They would go on to perform for Jacqueline Kennedy Onassis at the Kennedy Compound, and for Nelson Mandela in Johannesburg, South Africa, Harvard University as well as open for the Temptations, the Spinners, Taj Mahal and Tower of Power, whose band leader, Emilio Castillo asked him on four separate occasions to join Tower of Power.

After relocating to California in the early 1980s, Hall took Castillo up on the offer to join Tower of Power. He sang lead vocals and composed music for their 1987 album, Power (known as T.O.P. in Europe), on which he released the ballad "Some Days Were Meant For Rain", which was previously written while he was with the Ellis Hall Group, and dedicated to his former manager who was having marital problems at the time. After leaving Tower of Power, Hall worked as a session musician and featured artist on records with artists including the California Raisins, John Klemmer, Carl Anderson, Larry Dunn, George Duke and Kenny G, the latter with whom he scored an R&B hit singing a Preston Glass-produced remake of Junior Walker and The All-Stars' "What Does It Take (To Win Your Love)" from the album, Duotones (Arista – 1986).

Hall both wrote and performed on the soundtracks of multiple television movies and films including The Lion King 2, Shrek 2, Chicken Run, Invincible, and Bruce Almighty, sang gospel tunes in the comedy film, Big Momma's House with Martin Lawrence, and sang a Louis Armstrong tune in the crime drama film Catch Me If You Can with Leonardo DiCaprio.

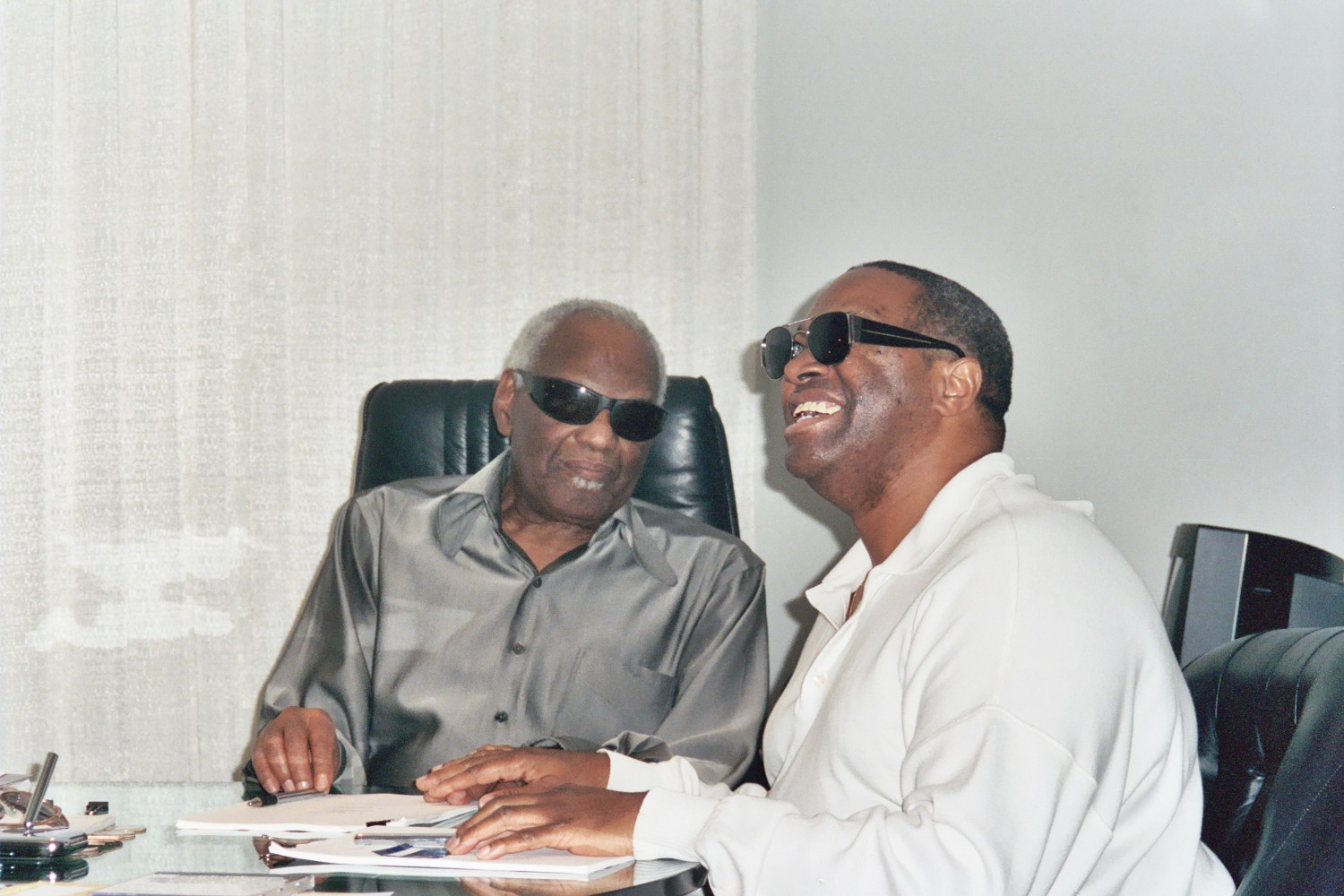
Ray Charles signs Hall to Crossover Records in 2002. Charles co-produced Hall's album Straight Ahead released in 2004

In 2001, Don Griffin introduced Hall to Ray Charles at West L.A. Music's annual Christmas party, where Hall was performing and Ray Charles was a guest. Ray was impressed when he heard Ellis playing "I Can See Clearly Now," After saying hello, Charles stayed for the entire performance and got in touch with Hall the next day. Their association lasted until Charles' death in 2004. Hall is called a protege of Charles, but he was already a mature artist when their friendship began. Charles signed Hall to his Crossover Records label in 2002. Hall was the only artist Charles signed to his label; as well as co-produced his first album. In October 2003, Hall played the Kennedy Center at Charles' request. Charles died just prior to Hall's release of Straight Ahead (2004). During the filming of the Taylor Hackford's film Ray starring Jamie Foxx, Hall was an onset advisor.

Hall continues to be extremely prolific. In 2015, he was nominated for an Ovation Theater Award "Best Male Lead in a Musical" on his first major play The Gospel at Colonus as well as a cast nomination for The NAACP Theater Awards.

Hall is currently featured on three songs on the Bootsy Collins release The Power of the One, one of which, "Wishing Well," was written by Ellis and Michael Sembello. He is featured on the remake of the Steve Winwood hit "Roll With It" from Jermaine Lockhart, which was released on George Benson's new label venture. At the end of 2020, Hall was honored with the Lifetime Achievement Award for his work with music in film and television, at the 15th Anniversary of the PVIFF-Peachtree Village International Film Festival in Atlanta, Georgia.

On the Friday before Valentine's Day 2021, Ellis released a re-make of "Let Me Call You Sweetheart", featuring Tata Vega.

It was announced in August 2021 that Ellis would be will be releasing his next studio album, Doc Kupka Presents: Let's Make an Arrangement, on Strokeland Records (via Regime Music Group) on September 10, 2021. "Let's Make an Arrangement" was co-written by Stephen "Doc" Kupka of Tower of Power, which Ellis also fronted.

== Symphony ==
On Charles' advice, Hall began to focus on the symphony show circuit after completing his album. Hall performed his first symphony at the Hollywood Bowl in 2005 in a commemoration for the 75th birthday of Ray Charles "A Night With Concord Records" presented by the Los Angeles Philharmonic Association's Jazz at the Bowl series and has since been playing with 81-piece orchestras internationally, including the Boston Pops and the Pittsburgh Symphony with Marvin Hamlisch conducting. Hall's first concept show was "Ellis Hall Presents: Ray, Motown and Beyond". In September 2016, he debuted his most recent concept show "Beyond Ellis Hall: Soul Unlimited" (conducted by Jeff Tyzik) where he adapted songs from David Bowie's "Let's Dance" to "Something" by George Harrison (which Hall recorded on his album Straight Ahead featuring Billy Preston on organ). Both "Ray, Motown and Beyond" and "Soul Unlimited" Hall co-produced with his wife and manager, Leighala Jimenez-Hall.

== Personal life ==
Ellis Hall married his artist manager Leighala Jimenez-Hall in May 2013, two years after they met on the Legendary Rhythm and Blues Cruise in 2011. This makes him the stepfather of Jimenez-Hall's daughter, Krystina Arielle.

== Philanthropy ==
Hall is involved with Gary Miller in Rock Against Trafficking and Artists UNited Against Human Trafficking, a partnership between United Nations Office on Drugs and Crime and artists committed to working against the crime of trafficking in persons. He recorded his own version of Sting's "Let Your Soul Be Your Pilot" for Rock Against Trafficking's compilation album, as well as the backend track for "Set Them Free", from which comes the name of the album. On the three-disc compilation, Music To Inspire – Artists UNited Against Human Trafficking, he provided the song "Be the Change".

He regularly returns to Boston for the Perkins School's annual gala event and has performed twice as the headliner with the Chorus in 2015 and 2018.

In 2020, Hall was one of the featured 'Voices 4 One World' on the charity single "One World." The song reunited songwriters 30 years after they met in Moscow during the 1989 Glasnost event "Music Speaks Louder Than Words." The songwriter Franke Previte and Pamela Phillips Oland, along with Estonian songwriters Sergei Manoukyan and Mikk Targo, created an entirely new recording of their collaboration with updated lyrics, retooled for the sole purpose of giving 100% of all proceeds to five major charity partners hit particularly hard by the pandemic (Musicians Foundation, The Actors Fund, First Responders Children's Foundation and the NAACP Legal Defense Fund). Hall returned to the project 30 years after singing the original demo recording of "One World", later recorded by Earth, Wind & Fire. The song reached number 27 on the Billboard Top 30 Mainstream Adult Contemporary chart.

== Discography ==
- The Spirit Lingers On...and On – ESP-Disk (2005)
- Straight Ahead – Crossover Records (2004)
- Love Can Make It Better – Crossover Records (2004)
- The Spirit Lingers On – ESP-Disk (1999)
- From Where I Stand (with Carl Anderson) – Chameleon Records (1989)
- Every Little Bit Hurts / Back It Up (Try It Again) / 12 inch – Houston Connection Recording Corporation (1983)

== Vocal credits ==
Year	Album (Artist)	Song(s)	Record label
1971	Paul Pena (Paul Pena)	"The River", "Adorable One" and "Woke Up This Morning"	Capitol Records
1973	Musical Visions (Various Artists)	"Georgia on My Mind"	Amphion Modern
1986	TOP (Tower of Power)		Genlyd
1986	Duotones (Kenny G)	"What Does It Take (To Win Your Love)"	Arista Records
1987	Power (Tower of Power)		Cypress Records
1987	California Raisins Sing The Hit Songs (The California Raisins)		Priority Records
1987	I Heard It Through the Grapevine (The California Raisins)	"You Can't Hurry Love"	Priority Records
1988	Out of Control (Dynasty)		Solar
1988	Christmas with The California Raisins (The California Raisins)		Priority Records
1988	Paradise Citizens (Randy Bernsen)	"Open Invitation"	Zebra Records
1988	101 North (101 North)	"Suzanne"	Valley Vue Records
1989	Music (John Klemmer)		MCA Records
1991	Midnight Matinee (Amanda McBroom)		Analogue Productions
1993	Lover's Silhouette (Larry Dunn Orchestra)		101 South Records
1994	Kathy Troccoli (Kathy Troccoli)	"Never My Love" and "If I'm Not in Love"	Reunion Records
1995	Thread (Thread)		Laughing Gull Records
1995	Reach for the Dream (Michael Sembello from Brother Time)		Canyon International
1997	Nu Flavor (Nu Flavor)	"Soul To Soul"	Reprise Records
1998	La Mia Risposta (Laura Pausini)	"Looking for an Angel"	CGD East West
2001	Voices (Daniel Lentz)	"A Tiger in the Garden"	Aoede Records
2002	Through the Looking Glass (Toto)	"Living for the City"	CMC, EMI
2004	Tambourine (Tift Merritt)	"Shadow in the Way"	Lost Highway
2005	Size Does Matter (Funk This!)	"Ungawa"	Not on Label
2006	Living with War (Neil Young)		Reprise Records
2010	Folk Songs for Jazzers (Frank Macchia)		Cacophony
2010	Son of Folk Songs for Jazzers (Frank Macchia)	"Careless Love"	Cacophony

== Filmography ==
Year	Title	Role	Notes
1985	Perfect	Soundtrack	Performer: "By Design"
1988	Arthur 2: On the Rocks	Soundtrack	Writer: "Boys Night Out"
1991	Highlander II: The Quickening	Soundtrack	Performer: "It's a Perfect, Perfect World"
1998	The Lion King II: Simba's Pride	Soundtrack	Performer: "One of Us"
2000	Big Momma's House	Actor	Organist
2000	Chicken Run	Soundtrack	Performer: "Flip, Flop and Fly"
2002	Catch Me If You Can	Soundtrack	Performer: "I'm Shooting High"
2002	Catch Me If You Can	Actor	Piano player/Singer
2003	Bruce Almighty	Actor	Performer
2004	A Day Without a Mexican	Soundtrack	Performer: "Cielito Lindo"
2006	Crooked	Soundtrack	Performer: "Get It", "Joy to the World"
2006	Invincible	Soundtrack	Performer: "What Is Real"
2011	Beneath the Darkness	Soundtrack	Performer: "Love Sick"
2016	2035	Actor	Harris Arvanne, Source

== Television ==
Year	Title	Role	Notes
1986	The Right of the People	Soundtrack	Performer: "America the Beautiful"
1990	Cop Rock	Soundtrack	Performer: "Clean It Up"
1992	The Wonder Years	Actor	The Wedding Singer
1996	Adventures from the Book of Virtues	Soundtrack	Performer: "Workin Is Fun"
