= Ain't Nothin' Stoppin' Us Now =

Studio album by Tower Of Power
- Released: 1976
- Studios: Kendun Recorders, Burbank, California; Record Plant, Los Angeles; Record Plant, Sausalito; CBS, San Francisco
- Genres: Soul, funk
- Length: 38:19
- Label: Columbia
- Producers: Emilio Castillo, Tower of Power

Tower Of Power chronology
Live and in Living Color (1976)	Ain't Nothin' Stoppin' Us Now (1976)	We Came to Play! (1978)

Professional ratings
Review scores
Source	Rating
AllMusic	3/5 stars

Ain't Nothin' Stoppin' Us Now is an album by Tower of Power released in 1976, the band's first record on Columbia Records. Ron Beck takes up the drummers spot after David Garibaldi exited for a second time.

This also would be the last album to feature bassist Francis "Rocco" Prestia as he would go on an extended hiatus from the band until his return in 1986. It is also the only album to feature vocalist Edward McGee.

== Release history ==
In addition to the standard 2 channel stereo version the album was also released by Columbia in a 4 channel quadraphonic version in 1976 on LP and 8-track tape. The quad LP was encoded with the SQ matrix.

This album was reissued in the UK on the Super Audio CD format in 2016 by Dutton Vocalion. This release contains the complete stereo and quad recordings.

== Track listing ==
1. "Ain't Nothin' Stoppin' Us Now" (Emilio Castillo, Stephen "Doc" Kupka, David Bartlett) – 3:58
2. "By Your Side" (Edward McGee, Clifford Coulter) – 4:30
3. "Make Someone Happy" (Ron E. Beck, Keith Rogers) – 2:47
4. "Doin' Alright" (Bruce Conte, Coleman Head) – 4:48
5. "Because I Think the World of You" (Stephen "Doc" Kupka, Frank Biner) – 3:00
6. "You Ought to Be Havin' Fun" (Hubert Tubbs, Emilio Castillo, Stephen "Doc" Kupka) – 3:06
7. "Can't Stand to See the Slaughter" (Stephen "Doc" Kupka, Emilio Castillo) – 2:47
8. "It's So Nice" (T. Castillo, Emilio Castillo, David Bartlett, Stephen "Doc" Kupka, Frank Biner) – 5:39
9. "Deal with It" (Chester Thompson) – 3:20
10. "While We Went to the Moon" (Stephen "Doc" Kupka, David Bartlett, Emilio Castillo) – 4:24

== Personnel ==
Tower of Power

- Edward McGee – lead vocals
- Chester Thompson – acoustic piano, Fender Rhodes, clavinet, organ, Moog synthesizer, bass pedals, backing vocals, horn arrangements (7, 9, 10), string arrangements and conductor (10)
- Bruce Conte – guitars, backing vocals
- Francis Rocco Prestia – bass guitar
- Ron E. Beck – drums, percussion, backing vocals
- Stephen "Doc" Kupka – baritone saxophone
- Lenny Pickett – tenor saxophone (with solo on 1 and 2), alto saxophone, Lyricon
- Emilio Castillo – tenor saxophone, backing vocals
- Mic Gillette – trombone, bass trombone, trumpet, flugelhorn, baritone horn, backing vocals; "superbone" solo (10)
- Greg Adams – trumpet, flugelhorn, backing vocals, horn arrangements (1−6, 8), string arrangements and conductor (2, 4, 5, 8), flugelhorn solo (3)

Additional musicians

- Bill Lamb – trombone (2), trumpet (2), flugelhorn (2)
- Tower of Power – horn arrangements (1, 8)
- Patricia Henley – backing vocals (1, 2, 4, 5, 6)
- Melba Joyce – backing vocals (1, 2, 4, 5, 6)
- Ivory Stone – backing vocals (1, 2, 4, 5, 6)
- Carol Rogers – backing vocals (3, 9, 10)

Production

- Emilio Castillo – producer
- Tower of Power – producers
- Alan Chinowsky – production assistant, engineer, mixing
- Bob Edwards – engineer, assistant engineer
- Jim Gaines – mixing
- Rich Ehrman – assistant engineer, mix assistant
- Bruce Steinberg – art direction, design, photography

Studios

- Recorded at Kendun Recorders (Burbank, California); Record Plant, Los Angeles (California); Record Plant, Sausalito (California); CBS Studios (San Francisco, California).
- Mixed at Record Plant, Sausalito.
