= Step Up (Tower of Power album) =

Studio album by Tower of Power
- Released: March 20, 2020
- Studios: Blue Moon, Los Angeles; Track Shack, Sacramento
- Genres: Funk; soul
- Length: 55:25
- Label: Mack Avenue
- Producers: Joe Vannelli; Emilio Castillo

Tower of Power chronology
Soul Side of Town (2018)	Step Up (2020)

Step Up is the nineteenth studio album by American group Tower of Power, on Mack Avenue Records. It was recorded over the course of the 2010s, and was released on March 20, 2020. This album is the last Tower of Power album to feature lead vocalists Ray Greene and Marcus Scott, and is also the last album to feature legendary bassist Francis Rocco Prestia before his death a few months later.

== Track listing ==
1. "East Bay, All the Way!" (Garibaldi, Prestia, Smith, Cortez) - 0:54
2. "Step Up" (Castillo, Smith) - 5:10
3. "The Story of You and I" (Castillo, Kupka) - 4:48
4. "Who Would Have Thought" (Kupka, Nick Lane, Lamont Van Hook) - 3:58
5. "Addicted to You" (Castillo, Sydney Justin) - 4:45
6. "Look in My Eyes" (Prestia, Thomas William Schuman, Kevin Henry Whalum) - 3:45
7. "You da One" (Prestia, Thomas William Schuman, Sennie Rudolph Martin) - 4:23
8. "Sleeping with You Baby" (Castillo, Kupka) - 5:43
9. "If It's Tea Give Me Coffee" (Kupka, William Ross) - 3:16
10. "Beyond My Wildest Dreams" (Bruce Conte) - 3:22
11. "Any Excuse Will Do" (Castillo, Kupka, Lenny Pickett) - 4:43
12. "If You Wanna Be a Winner" – 3:22 (Castillo, Garibaldi, Prestia, Smith, Cortez) - 3:22
13. "Let's Celebrate Our Love" (Castillo, Mark Dolin) 4:26
14. "East Bay! Oaktown All the Way!" (Garibaldi, Prestia, Smith, Cortez) - 1:08

== Personnel ==
- Emilio Castillo - bandleader, second tenor saxophone, lead vocals (on "Look In My Eyes" and "Any Excuse Will Do"), background vocals
- Stephen "Doc" Kupka - baritone saxophone
- Francis Rocco Prestia - bass guitar
- David Garibaldi - drums
- Roger Smith - keyboards, Hammond B3 organ, lead vocals (on "You da One")
- Jerry Cortez - guitars, background vocals, electric sitar (on "Who Would Have Thought?")
- Tom E. Politzer - first tenor saxophone, alto saxophone (on "The Story of You and I" and "Any Excuse Will Do")
- Adolfo Acosta - second trumpet, flugelhorn
- Sal Cracchiolo - first trumpet, flugelhorn
- Marcus Scott - lead vocals (on "The Story of You and I", "Sleeping With You Baby", and "Let's Celebrate Our Love"), background vocals
- Ray Greene - lead vocals (on "Step Up", "Who Would Have Thought?", "Addicted To You", "If It's Tea Give Me Coffee", "Beyond My Wildest Dreams", and "If You Wanna Be a Winner"), background vocals, trombone
- Joe Vannelli - keyboards, auxiliary percussion, vibes, marimba
- Chuck Hansen - bass saxophone (on "If You Wanna Be a Winner")
- Leah Meux - background vocals
- Tiwana Porter - background vocals
- Melanie Jackson - background vocals
- Dave Eskridge - horn and string arrangements
