= Hubert Tubbs =

American singer

Hubert Tubbs (November 18, 1947 - September 9, 2024) was an American vocalist, singer, and songwriter of soul, funk, and gospel and has cooperated with a number of music acts.

His debut introduction was as a lead vocalist for the band Tower of Power (also known as TOP), an American R&B-based band, originating in Oakland, California. In 1975 he replaced Lenny Williams, who had fronted the band between early 1973 and late 1974.

Tubbs became lead vocalist for TOP's 1975 album In the Slot and again appearing as lead singer for the band's 1976 tour and live album Live and in Living Color. He would serve as a co-writer on the ensuing albums Ain't Nothin' Stoppin' Us Now in 1976 with "You Ought to Be Havin' Fun" and 1978 album We Came to Play! with "Share My Life" and "Am I a Fool?".

Tubbs moved from the USA to Austria at the end of the 90s, where The Horny Funk Brothers (also known as HFB) were founded in 1999 with Hubert Tubbs as frontman.

In 2007, he collaborated with The Freedom Warriors in a joint album called ... And Nothing But the Truth that featured Tubbs and Sista Sonic. In 2008 he appeared with The Johnwaynes in the EP Muzzle that featured Tubbs and in deep house artist Fritz Da Groove in the MP3 "It's Alright" / "Sunshine".

In 2014, he came to prominence again with being featured as vocalist for the French electropop trio Panzer Flower in their song "We Are Beautiful".

In 2021, The Horny Funk Brothers feat. Hubert Tubbs released the CD "Funky Is The Way We Roll".

Tubbs died in Vienna, Austria in September of 2024.

== Discography ==
=== Albums and EPs ===
with Tower of Power

- 1975: In the Slot
- 1976: Live and in Living Color

with The Horny Funk Brothers

- 2021: Funky Is The Way We Roll

Joint albums

- 2007: ... And Nothing But the Truth (The Freedom Warriors featuring Hubert Tubbs and Sista Sonic)
- 2008: Muzzle EP (The Johnwaynes featuring Hubert Tubbs)

=== Singles ===
Featured in

Year	Single	Peak positions			Album
Year	Single	FR	BEL (Vl)	BEL (Wa)	Album
2014	"We Are Beautiful" (Panzer Flower featuring Hubert Tubbs)	17	11	9	

Others

- 2008: "It's Alright" / "Sunshine" (Fritz Da Groove featuring Hubert Tubbs)

== In popular culture ==
- in 1987, he was part of the soundtrack for the film Blind Date with the song "Crash, Bang, Boom".
