= Souled Out (Tower of Power album) =

Studio album by Tower of Power
- Released: August 15, 1995
- Studios: The Complex (Los Angeles, California); Stagg Street Studio (Los Angeles, California); JHL Sound (Pacific Palisades, California); Wings West Recording (Easton, Connecticut)
- Genre: R&B
- Length: 50:25
- Label: Epic
- Producers: Emilio Castillo, Jeff Lorber

Tower of Power chronology
T.O.P. (1993)	Souled Out (1995)	Rhythm & Business (1997)

Souled Out is a 1995 album by Tower of Power on Epic Records. It marked the debut of lead vocalist Brent Carter and drummer Herman Matthews, who, coincidentally, is a distant cousin of former TOP vocalist Rick Stevens. Founding member, baritone saxophone player Stephen "Doc" Kupka graces the front cover of the album. Jeff Lorber co-produced this album with band leader Emilio Castillo.

== Track listing ==
1. "Souled Out" (Castillo, Kupka, Marion McClain) - 3:49
2. "Taxed to the Max" (Kupka, Jeff Lorber, Jeff Pescetto) - 4:19
3. "Keep Comin' Back" (Lorber, Pescetto) - 3:47
4. "Soothe You" (Troy Dexter, Grillo) - 3:52
5. "Do You Wanna (Make Love to Me)" (Castillo, Lorber) - 3:51
6. "Lovin' You Forever" (McClain) - 4:15
7. "Gotta Make a Change" (Danielian, Bob Franceschini, Ozzie Mendelez) - 3:38
8. "Diggin' on James Brown" (Castillo, Ken Kessie) - 4:40
9. "Sexy Soul" (Castillo) - 4:43
10. "Just Like You" (Castillo, Kupka, Pescetto) - 4:27
11. "Once You Get a Taste" (Castillo, Kessie, James Wirrick) - 4:01
12. "Undercurrent" (Danielian, Mann) - 5:01

== Personnel ==
Tower of Power

- Brent Carter – lead and backing vocals
- Emilio Castillo – tenor saxophone, backing vocals, lead vocals (8)
- Stephen "Doc" Kupka – baritone saxophone
- David Mann – alto saxophone, tenor saxophone, horn arrangements (1, 5, 8, 9, 10, 12), tenor sax solo (8, 9, 12)
- Bill Churchville – trombone, trumpet, flugelhorn, horn arrangements (2, 3, 4), lead trumpet (2, 3, 4, 6, 9, 11), trumpet solo (7)
- Barry Danielian – trumpet, lead trumpet (1, 5, 7, 8, 10, 12), horn arrangements (1, 5, 7−10, 12), flugelhorn solo (6), trumpet solo (12)
- Nick Milo – keyboards, Hammond B3 organ solo (2), Minimoog solo (3)
- Carmen Grillo – guitars, guitar solo (11), backing vocals
- Rocco Prestia – bass
- Herman Matthews – drums, percussion, hum-drum (12)

Additional musicians

- Jeff Lorber – clarinet (2, 5), guitars (5)
- Lenny Castro – percussion (3, 4)
- Brandon Fields – saxophone (3, 4)
- Dave Eskridge – horn arrangements (6, 11)
- Bob Franceschini – horn arrangements (7)
- Ozzie Melendez – horn arrangements (7)

== Production ==
- Emilio Castillo – producer
- Jeff Lorber – producer (3−6), overdub recording
- Jeff Pescetto – lead vocal production (2, 5)
- Barry Danielian – co-producer (12)
- David Mann – co-producer (12)
- Ken Kessie – basic track recording
- Alan Meyerson – basic track recording, mixing
- Richard Bosworth – overdub recording
- Randy Faustino – overdub recording
- Roland Alvarez – assistant engineer
- Trent Slatton – assistant engineer
- Michael Caplan – A&R
- Maureen Droney – production coordinator
- Al Masocco – product manager
- David Coleman – art direction
- Christine Wilson – design
- Bret Lopez – photography
- Mimi DeBlaso – stylist
- Michelle Zarin – management

Studios

- Recorded at The Complex and Stagg Street Studio (Los Angeles, California); JHL Sound (Pacific Palisades, California): Wings West Recording (Easton, Connecticut).
- Mixed at JHL Sound

== In popular culture ==
The 2002 Baby Einstein video movie, Baby Newton: All About Shapes, originally parodied the track "Diggin' on James Brown" under the title "I Know My Shapes", as written and performed by Jack Moss, with lyrics contextualizing the usage of shapes to draw a clown. Likely due to potential copyright concerns surrounding "James Brown" as the basis, "I Know My Shapes" was rewritten and recomposed for a 2004 rerelease of Baby Newton (which is the current version officially distributed on DVD and streaming), with Callie Moore replacing Jack Moss as the singer and songwriter.
