= Bruce Conte =

American guitarist (1950–2021)

- Born: March 3, 1950; Sanger, California, U.S.
- Died: August 8, 2021 (aged 71) Cebu, Philippines
- Genres: Rhythm and blues jazz fusion
- Occupation: Musician
- Instrument: Guitar
- Years active: 1967–2021
- Formerly of: Tower of Power
- Website: www.bruceconte.com

Bruce Anthony Conte (March 3, 1950 – August 8, 2021) was an American R&B and jazz fusion guitarist, known primarily for his work with the band Tower of Power, of which he was a member from 1972 to 1979. He performed on seven albums and rejoined the band for live work briefly in 2006-2007.

== Biography ==
Bruce Conte was born in Sanger, and grew up in Fresno, California USA. Conte and his cousin Victor Conte began playing in a 'family' rhythm and blues band as junior high school students in the early 1960s. Throughout high school they performed in the rhythm sections of several local bands, including Common Ground, playing the local club scene in 1967–69.

In 1969, Conte moved to the San Francisco Bay Area and joined The Loading Zone, who shared rehearsal halls with, and regularly opened shows for, Tower of Power. Conte became close to Tower of Power's founder and leader, Emilio Castillo, and to Stephen Kupka—the primary songwriters for the group—and began co-writing songs with them and occasionally sitting in with the band.

In 1972, Tower of Power began recording their eponymously titled third album, but at the beginning of the sessions, Castillo decided to change a number of band members and Conte and fellow Loading Zone member Lenny Pickett were invited to join, along with lead vocalist Lenny Williams.

Conte remained with Tower Of Power until 1979, performing on the albums Tower of Power, Back to Oakland, Urban Renewal, In The Slot, Ain't Nothin' Stoppin' Us Now, We Came to Play!, and the live album Live And In Living Color. Conte also contributed backing vocals, as well as a number of songs to these albums both as sole and co-writer.

In an interview with Robb Lawrence, Conte cited as his primary influences Albert King, Grant Green, George Benson and Jimmy Nolen (primarily his work with James Brown). Conte's lead playing is mostly in an expanded blues style often using blues, pentatonic and Dorian mode scales.

After leaving Tower of Power in 1979, Conte played in a number of groups in the San Francisco and Los Angeles areas, as well as with Al McKay in his All-Stars and released four solo albums. One of these is Bullet Proof on Severn Records (2002).

In 2006, Conte rejoined Tower of Power, touring with the band for 14 months, before moving to Cebu in the Philippines.

Back in Los Angeles in 2012, Conte, an insulin-dependent diabetic, announced that a routine blood test in July of that year had revealed that he had leukemia. An appeal to raise funds for his medical treatment was established via the Jeremy Wilson Foundation.

== Equipment ==
Conte's guitar throughout nearly his entire period with Tower of Power was a 1957 Gibson Les Paul Goldtop. Conte performed primarily using the neck pick-up and played the guitar so much that he wore through the pickup cover. Conte sold the guitar in 2006.

During the Tower of Power years, Conte played through a 1967 Fender Super Reverb in the studio, using a Fender Quad Reverb or sometimes Twin Reverb for live work. He also used Vox wah wah and MXR Phase 90 effects pedals. More recently Conte has played a Baker guitar through a Rivera amplifier.

== Death ==
Conte died on August 8, 2021, after being diagnosed with leukemia.
