= Rocco Prestia =

American bassist (1951–2020)

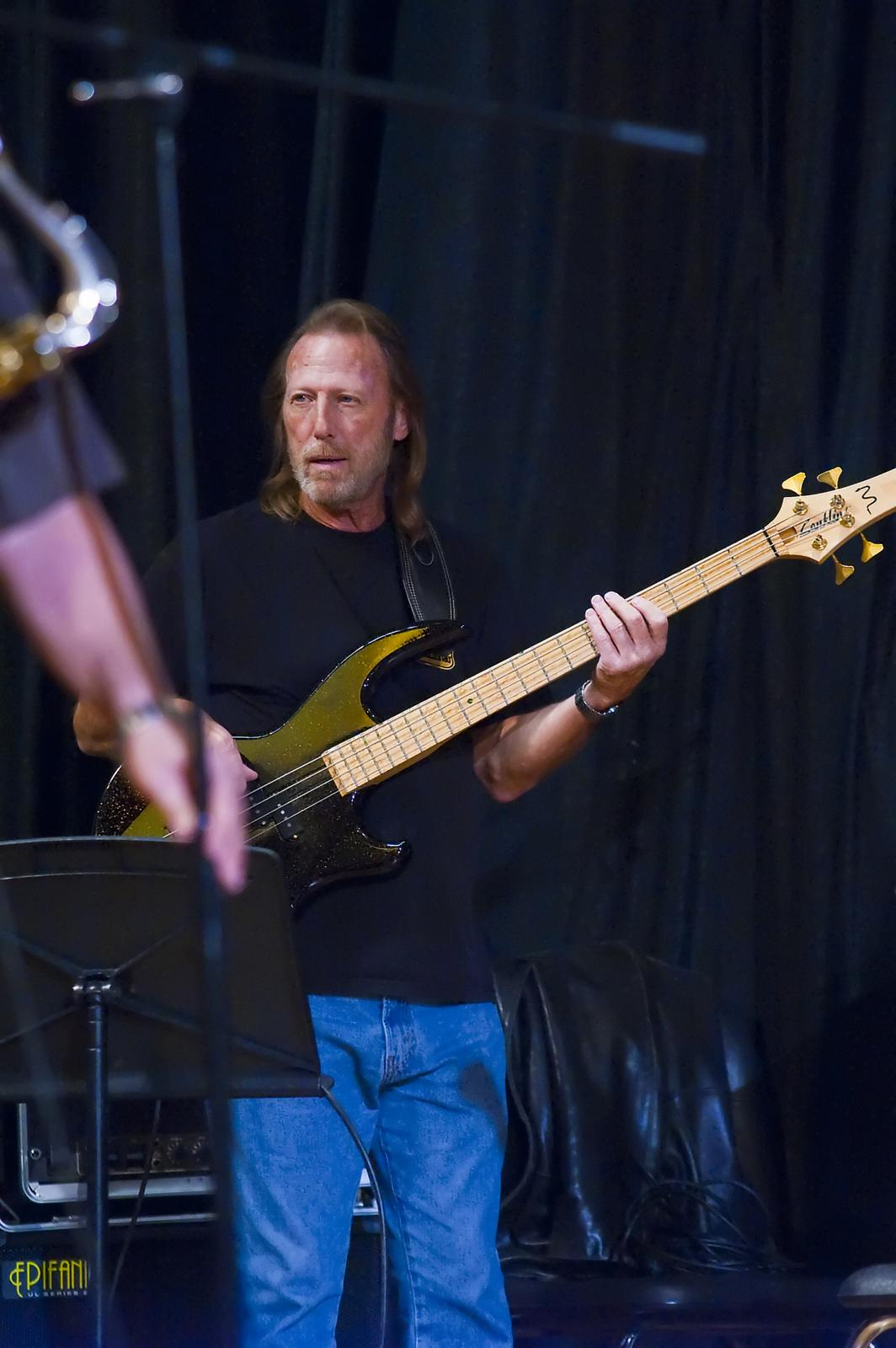
- Prestia in 2010

Background information
- Born: Francis Rocco Prestia Jr. March 7, 1951; Sonora, California, U.S.
- Died: September 29, 2020 (aged 69) Las Vegas, Nevada, U.S.
- Genres: Smooth jazz, jazz-funk, funk, rhythm and blues
- Occupation: Musician
- Instrument: Electric bass
- Years active: 1970–2020
- Formerly of: Tower of Power

Francis Rocco Prestia Jr. (March 7, 1951 – September 29, 2020) was an American bassist, best known for his contributions with the funk band Tower of Power.

== Biography ==
Born in Sonora, California, Prestia started playing electric guitar as an adolescent. When he auditioned for Emilio Castillo's band, Tower of Power, Castillo persuaded him to switch to electric bass.

Prestia contributed to the band for the next three decades, before he became seriously ill in 2001. His fans and friends created a foundation in order to help pay the artist's medical costs. On December 5, 2014, Prestia underwent successful liver transplant surgery.

Rocco is survived by the loves of his life, Julian Francis Rocco Prestia and Alicia-Lyn JoAnn Prestia.

== Technique and influences ==
Prestia was a master of fingerstyle funk bass playing. His technique made heavy use of left hand muting. He muted his strings lightly to create a thick percussive sound while maintaining pitch clarity. He also frequently incorporated ghost notes to fill empty space. His characteristic sound, in combination with a highly rhythmic approach to bass lines, makes Prestia's sound unmistakable.

Along with James Jamerson, Stanley Clarke, Anthony Jackson and Alphonso Johnson, Prestia belonged to a generation of musicians that fostered a revolution on the electric bass—inspiring the innovative work of Jaco Pastorius in the mid-1970s. Prestia's influential style can be heard on classic Tower of Power tracks such as the 1973 hit "What is Hip". Prestia cited James Jamerson and the different musicians who worked for James Brown (particularly Bootsy Collins) as his main influences.

== Equipment ==
Prestia's primary instruments were his Fender Precision basses (a purple transparent American Deluxe and a natural ash-bodied short-lived signature model with a reverse split pickup and a 2-band EQ). He later maintained an association with the Conklin company that provided him a custom built four-string instrument, one of the few in the company's catalog.

In January 2013, ESP Guitars announced that Prestia had joined their roster of endorsing artists. The company made reference to the introduction of their LTD RB series on May 22, 2014.

== Death ==
Prestia died on September 29, 2020, at age 69, in a Las Vegas hospice.

== Discography ==
=== As leader ===
- Everybody on the Bus! (1999)

=== With Tower of Power ===
- East Bay Grease (1970)
- Bump City (1972)
- Tower of Power (1973)
- Back to Oakland (1974)
- Urban Renewal (1975)
- In The Slot (1975)
- Live and in Living Color (1976)
- Ain't Nothin' Stoppin' Us Now (1976)
- Power (1987)
- Monster on a Leash (1991)
- T.O.P. (1993)
- Souled Out (1995)
- Rhythm & Business (1997)
- Direct Plus (1997)
- Soul Vaccination Live (1999)
- Dinosaur Tracks (2000)
- Oakland Zone (2003)
- The Great American Soul Book (2009)
- Soul Side of Town (2018)
- Step Up (2020)

=== With Other Artists ===
- Carmen Grillo, Both Sides Of The Coin (1996)
- Bruce Conte, Right From My Heart (1997) (bass on "Thump")
- Yoichi Murata, Hook Up (1999) (bass on "Positive Sign", "When You Leave (And I...)", "Carry On")
- Gov't Mule, The Deep End, Volume 2 (2002) (bass on "What Is Hip?")

== Videography ==
- Fingerstyle Funk (1993)
- Francis Rocco Prestia: Live at Bass Day (1998)
