= Tower of Power =

American R&B and funk band

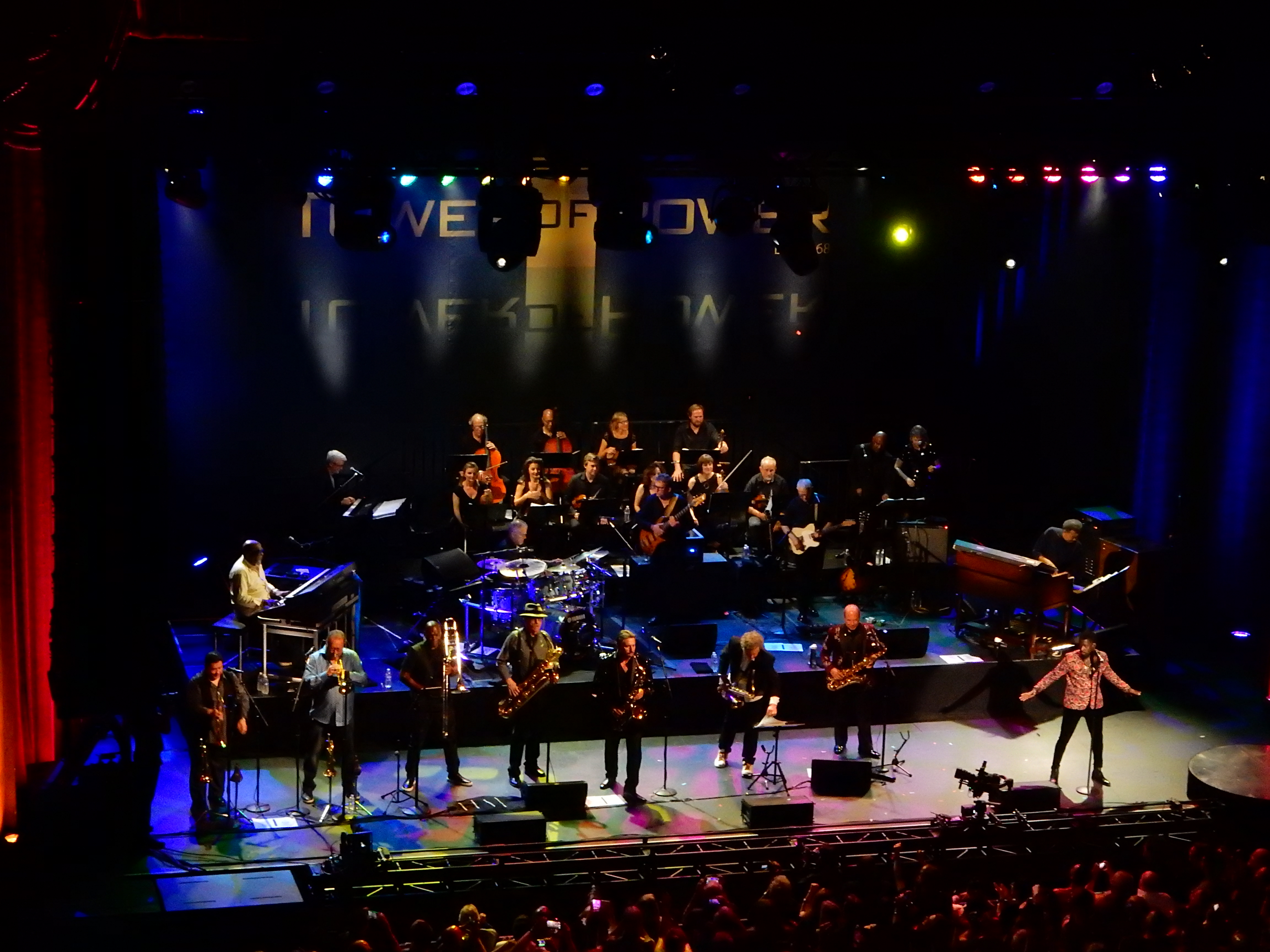
- Tower of Power performing in 2018

Background information
- Origin: Oakland, California, U.S.
- Genres: Soul; funk; R&B; jazz; jazz-funk
- Years active: 1968–present
- Labels: Warner Bros.; Columbia; Epic; San Francisco; Mack Avenue
- Members: Emilio Castillo; Stephen 'Doc' Kupka; Adolfo Acosta; Tom E. Politzer; Jerry Cortez; Marc van Wageningen; Dave Richards; Pete Antunes; Jordan John; Mike Jerel
- Past members: see past members
- Website: www.towerofpower.com

Tower of Power is an American R&B and funk band and horn section, originating in Oakland, California, that has been performing since 1968. The band has had a number of lead vocalists, the best-known being Lenny Williams, who fronted the band between early 1973 and late 1974, the period of their greatest commercial success. They have had eight songs on the Billboard Hot 100; their highest-charting songs include "You're Still a Young Man", "So Very Hard to Go", "What Is Hip?", and "Don't Change Horses (in the Middle of a Stream)".

== History ==
In the summer of 1968, tenor saxophonist/vocalist Emilio Castillo met Stephen "Doc" Kupka, who played baritone sax. Castillo had played in several bands, and hired Kupka after a home audition on the advice of his father. Within months the group, then known as The Motowns, began playing various gigs around Oakland and Berkeley, attracting audiences from minority and counterculture communities.

In order to play Bill Graham's Fillmore Auditorium in San Francisco, the band changed its name to Tower of Power, which then stuck.

By 1970, the renamed band—now including trumpet/arranger Greg Adams, first trumpet Mic Gillette, first saxophone Skip Mesquite, Francis "Rocco" Prestia on bass, Willie Fulton on guitar, and drummer David Garibaldi—signed a recording contract with Bill Graham's San Francisco Records and released their first album, East Bay Grease. Rufus Miller performed most of the lead vocals on this debut album. The group was first introduced to the San Francisco Bay area by radio station KSAN, which played a variety of artists such as Cold Blood, Eric Mercury, and Marvin Gaye.

Augmented by percussionist/conga/bongo player Brent Byars, Tower of Power was released from their San Francisco label contract and moved to Warner Bros. Records. Rick Stevens replaced Rufus Miller as lead singer on 1972's Bump City, which gave the band their first national exposure. This album included the hit single "You're Still a Young Man", which peaked at No. 29 on the Billboard Hot 100 and was Stevens' pinnacle vocal performance before leaving the band. Emilio Castillo, who co-wrote the tune with Stephen Kupka, told Songfacts that the song was based on a true story about him and a former girlfriend who was six years his senior.

Tower of Power, released in the spring of 1973, was the third album for the band. It featured soul singer Lenny Williams on lead vocals and Lenny Pickett on lead tenor saxophone. Bruce Conte replaced guitarist Willie Fulton and keyboardist Chester D.Thompson also joined the band during the recording of the album. The album spawned their most-successful single "So Very Hard to Go". Although the single peaked at No. 17 on the Billboard Hot 100, it was included in the Top 10 in the surveys of many West Coast Top 40 radio stations, placed No. 1 on several of them. The album also charted two other singles on the Billboard Hot 100, "This Time It's Real" and "What Is Hip?"

1974's Back to Oakland spawned the hit single "Don't Change Horses (in the Middle of a Stream)", which reached No. 26 on the Billboard Hot 100, and "Time Will Tell", which charted at No. 69. The funk-jazz instrumental "Squib Cakes" also came from this album.

On Urban Renewal (1974), the band moved more toward funk than soul; however, they continued recording ballads as well. Williams left the band in late 1974, and was replaced as vocalist by Hubert Tubbs. The band's airplay on chart radio declined. During the late 1970s they briefly tried recording disco-sounding material.

On January 12, 2017, long-time drummer David Garibaldi and bassist Marc Van Wageningen were hit by an Amtrak train--which had been obscured by another train that just passed--as they walked across tracks embedded in the middle of Embarcadero Street before a performance in the neighborhood of Oakland's Jack London Square. They both survived the accident, likely due to the fact the street-running train was only traveling ~15 mph. According to their manager, Jeremy Westby, they were both "responsive and being treated at a local hospital". They fully recovered and returned to the active lineup later that year.

== Collaborations ==
Tower's horn section appeared on a number of other artists' recordings, including Otis Redding, Aaron Neville, Aerosmith, Bonnie Raitt, David Sanborn, Eric Clapton, Elton John, Labelle, Huey Lewis, Little Feat, Heart, Michelle Shocked, Paula Abdul, Santana, Masayoshi Takanaka, and Stevie Nicks.

The horn section also recorded with bassist Larry Graham's Graham Central Station, Grateful Dead, Carlos Santana, Journey, Elkie Brooks, Cat Stevens (on his Foreigner Suite), Luis Miguel, Linda Lewis, R.A.D. (Rose Ann Dimalanta), Jermaine Jackson, John Lee Hooker, Helen Reddy, Rufus, Rod Stewart, Jefferson Starship, Mickey Hart, Heart, Damn Yankees, Frankie Valli, Spyro Gyra, KMFDM, Lyle Lovett, Poison, Phish (two songs on their album Hoist), Toto, Pharoahe Monch, Ned Doheny, and the Brothers Johnson among many other acts.

The song "So Very Hard To Go" was featured on the soundtracks of the 2002 film City of God, and Will Ferrell's 2008 film Semi-Pro.

== Members ==
Current members

- Emilio "Mimi" Castillo – tenor saxophone, backing and lead vocals (1968–present)
- Stephen "Doc" Kupka – baritone saxophone, backing vocals (1968–present)
- Adolfo Acosta – trumpet, flugelhorn, backing vocals (2000–present)
- Tom E. Politzer – tenor, alto and baritone saxophones, clarinet, flute, backing vocals (2002–present)
- Jerry Cortez – guitar, sitar, backing vocals (2010–present)
- Marc van Wageningen – bass (2018–present; plus touring appearances beforehand)
- Dave Richards – trumpet, flugelhorn, trombone, backing vocals (2023-present)
- Pete Antunes – drums, percussion (2024–present)
- Jordan John – lead vocals (2024–present)
- Mike Jerel – keyboards, backing vocals (2025–present)

== Discography ==
=== Studio albums ===
Year	Album	Chart positions			Certifications
Year	Album	US Pop	US R&B	US Jazz	Certifications
1970	East Bay Grease	106	–	–	
1972	Bump City	85	16	–	
1973	Tower of Power	15	11	–	RIAA: Gold
1974	Back to Oakland	26	13	–	
1975	Urban Renewal	22	19	–	
1975	In the Slot	67	29	–	
1976	Ain't Nothin' Stoppin' Us Now	42	25	–	
1978	We Came to Play!	89	33	–	
1979	Back on the Streets	106	28	–	
1981	Direct	–	–	–	
1987	Power (US version of TOP album)	–	–	–	
1991	Monster on a Leash	–	–	19	
1993	T.O.P.	–	92	–	
1995	Souled Out	–	–	7	
1997	Rhythm & Business	–	–	–	
1999	Dinosaur Tracks (recorded 1980–1983)	–	–	–	
2003	Oakland Zone	–	–	–	
2009	The Great American Soulbook	–	–	3	
2018	Soul Side of Town	–	–	–	
2020	Step Up	–	–	–	
2023	It's Christmas	–	–	–	
"–" denotes releases that did not chart.

=== Live albums ===
Year	Album	Chart positions		
Year	Album	US Pop	US R&B	US Jazz
1976	Live and in Living Color	99	29	–
1999	Soul Vaccination: Tower of Power Live	–	–	8
2008	The East Bay Archive Volume 1 (recorded April 1973 at K-K-K-Katy's, Boston, MA)	–	–	–
2011	40th Anniversary: The Fillmore Auditorium, San Francisco	–	–	6
2013	Hipper Than Hip: Yesterday, Today & Tomorrow (Live on the Air & In the Studio 1974)	–	–	–
2021	50 Years of Funk & Soul - Live at the Fox Theater Oakland CA - June 2018	–	–	–
"–" denotes releases that did not chart.

=== Compilations ===
- 1974: Funkland
- 1999: What Is Hip? The Tower of Power Anthology
- 2001: The Very Best of Tower of Power: The Warner Years
- 2002: Soul with a Capital "S" - The Best of Tower of Power
- 2003: Havin' Fun
- 2003: What Is Hip and Other Hits

=== Singles ===
Year	Title	Chart positions			Album
Year	Title	US	US R&B	CAN	Album
1971	"Back on the Streets Again"	–	–	–	East Bay Grease
1972	"You're Still a Young Man"	29	24	30	Bump City
1972	"Down to the Nightclub"	66	–	–	Bump City
1973	"So Very Hard to Go"	17	11	36	Tower of Power
1973	"This Time It's Real"	65	27	–	Tower of Power
1974	"What Is Hip?"	91	39	–	Tower of Power
1974	"Time Will Tell"	69	27	75	Back to Oakland
1974	"Don't Change Horses (In the Middle of a Stream)"	26	22	59	Back to Oakland
1974	"Only So Much Oil in the Ground"	–	85	–	Urban Renewal
1975	"Willing to Learn"	–	77	–	Urban Renewal
1975	"You're So Wonderful, So Marvelous"	–	57	–	In the Slot
1975	"Treat Me Like Your Man"	–	–	–	In the Slot
1976	"You Ought to Be Havin' Fun"	68	62	–	Ain't Nothin' Stoppin' Us Now
1976	"Ain't Nothin' Stoppin' Us Now"	–	95	–	Ain't Nothin' Stoppin' Us Now
1978	"Lovin' You Is Gonna See Me Thru"	–	98	–	We Came to Play!
1978	"We Came to Play"	–	–	–	We Came to Play!
1979	"Rock Baby"	–	61	–	Back on the Streets
1979	"In Due Time"	–	–	–	Back on the Streets
"–" denotes releases that did not chart or were not released in that territory.

=== Videos and DVDs ===
- 1986: Credit (the band's first music video, released to promote Power)
- 2003: Tower of Power in Concert (1998, Live at Ohne Filter, just after the return of David Garibaldi)
- 2007: Live from Leverkusen (recorded in November 2005)
- 2011: 40th Anniversary (Live) (recorded in 2009)
- 2020: Look In My Eyes (the band's first music video in over 30 years, released to promote Step Up)

Note: Over the decades, there have been many televised performances of Tower of Power, several of which can be found on YouTube. In 2011, Time Life released TOP's November 10, 1973 Soul Train performance of "What is Hip?" on the CD The Best of Soul Train Live.

== See also ==
- Lenny Williams
