= Live and in Living Color =

Live album by Tower Of Power
- Released: 1976
- Venues: Sacramento Memorial Auditorium, Sacramento, California; Cerritos College, Norwalk, California
- Genres: Soul, funk
- Length: 38:19
- Label: Warner Bros.
- Producers: Emilio Castillo, Tower of Power

Tower Of Power chronology
In The Slot (1975)	Live and in Living Color (1976)	Ain't Nothin' Stoppin' Us Now (1976)

Professional ratings
Review scores
Source	Rating
Christgau's Record Guide	B

Live and in Living Color is a 1976 live album by Tower of Power and is their last album on Warner Bros. Records. It features a few of their biggest hits and some gems from their first album East Bay Grease. David Garibaldi left the band again after this album.

== Track listing ==
1. "Down to the Nightclub (Bump City)" (David Garibaldi, Emilio Castillo, Steve Kupka) - 2:30
2. "You're Still a Young Man" (Emilio Castillo, Steve Kupka) - 5:14
3. "What Is Hip?" (David Garibaldi, Emilio Castillo, Steve Kupka) - 6:35
4. "Sparkling in the Sand" (Emilio Castillo, Lawrence J. Lopez, Steve Kupka) - 8:12
5. "Knock Yourself Out" (Emilio Castillo, Steve Kupka) - 23:08

== Personnel ==
Tower of Power

- Hubert Tubbs - lead vocals
- Bruce Conte - guitar, co-lead vocals on "Sparkling in the Sand"
- Chester Thompson - organ, keyboards, vocals
- Francis "Rocco" Prestia - bass
- David Garibaldi - drums
- Lenny Pickett - first tenor saxophone, soprano saxophone, alto saxophone, flute
- Emilio Castillo - second tenor saxophone, vocals
- Stephen "Doc" Kupka - baritone saxophone
- Mic Gillette - trumpet, trombone, flugelhorn, piccolo trumpet, bass trombone, vocals
- Greg Adams - trumpet, flugelhorn
