= Greg Adams (musician) =

American trumpet/flugelhorn player and arranger

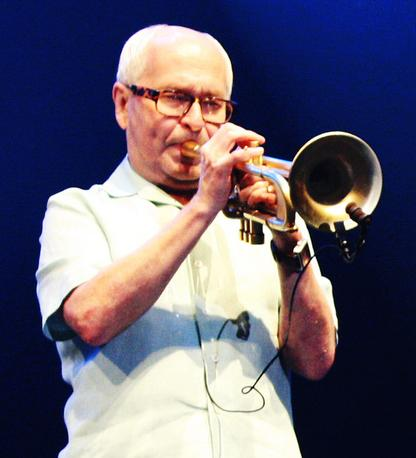

Background information
- Origin: San Francisco Bay Area, California, United States
- Genres: Smooth jazz
- Instruments: Trumpet; flugelhorn
- Years active: 1970–present
- Formerly of: Tower of Power
- Website: gregadamsmusic.com

Greg Adams is an American trumpet/flugelhorn player and music arranger, probably best known for his work with the band Tower of Power.

== Early life ==
Adams grew up in the San Francisco Bay Area, and while attending Westmoor High School in Daly City he had already established a reputation as a musical prodigy.

== Career ==
He had made plans to attend the Berklee School of Music in Boston, but instead accepted an invitation to join Tower of Power for their first album, East Bay Grease (1970). He remained with the band for 25 years and was responsible for many of their distinctive horn arrangements, including "What Is Hip?" (1973) which earned him a Grammy Award nomination.

In 1995 Adams recorded his first solo album, Hidden Agenda (Epic), which reached #1 on the U.S. smooth jazz charts. His subsequent albums include Midnight Morning (Ripa, Blue Note) (2002), Firefly (215) (2004), and Cool To The Touch (Ripa) (2006).

Adams has recorded with and/or arranged for other artists, including Chicago, Heart, Elton John, Huey Lewis and the News, Little Feat, Bonnie Raitt, and Carlos Santana. In 1989 he was nominated (with Paul Shaffer) for an Emmy Award for his arrangements for the Late Night with David Letterman seventh anniversary special.

Since 2009, Adams has led the band Greg Adams and East Bay Soul as founder.

== Awards and nominations ==
=== Grammy Awards ===
Greg Adams has been nominated for one Grammy Award.

Year	Nominee / work	Award	Result
1981	"What Is Hip"	Best Instrumental Arrangement Accompanying Vocal(s)	Nominated

== Discography ==
- Hidden Agenda (1995)
- Midnight Morning (2002)
- Firefly (2004)
- Cool to the Touch (2006)
- East Bay Soul (2009)
- East Bay Soul 2.0 (2012)
- East Bay Soul: That's Life (2015)
- East Bay Soul: Conversation (2018)
- East Bay Soul: Underneath the Mistletoe (2019)
- East Bay Soul: The Real (2023)
