= Emilio Castillo =

American saxophone player and composer

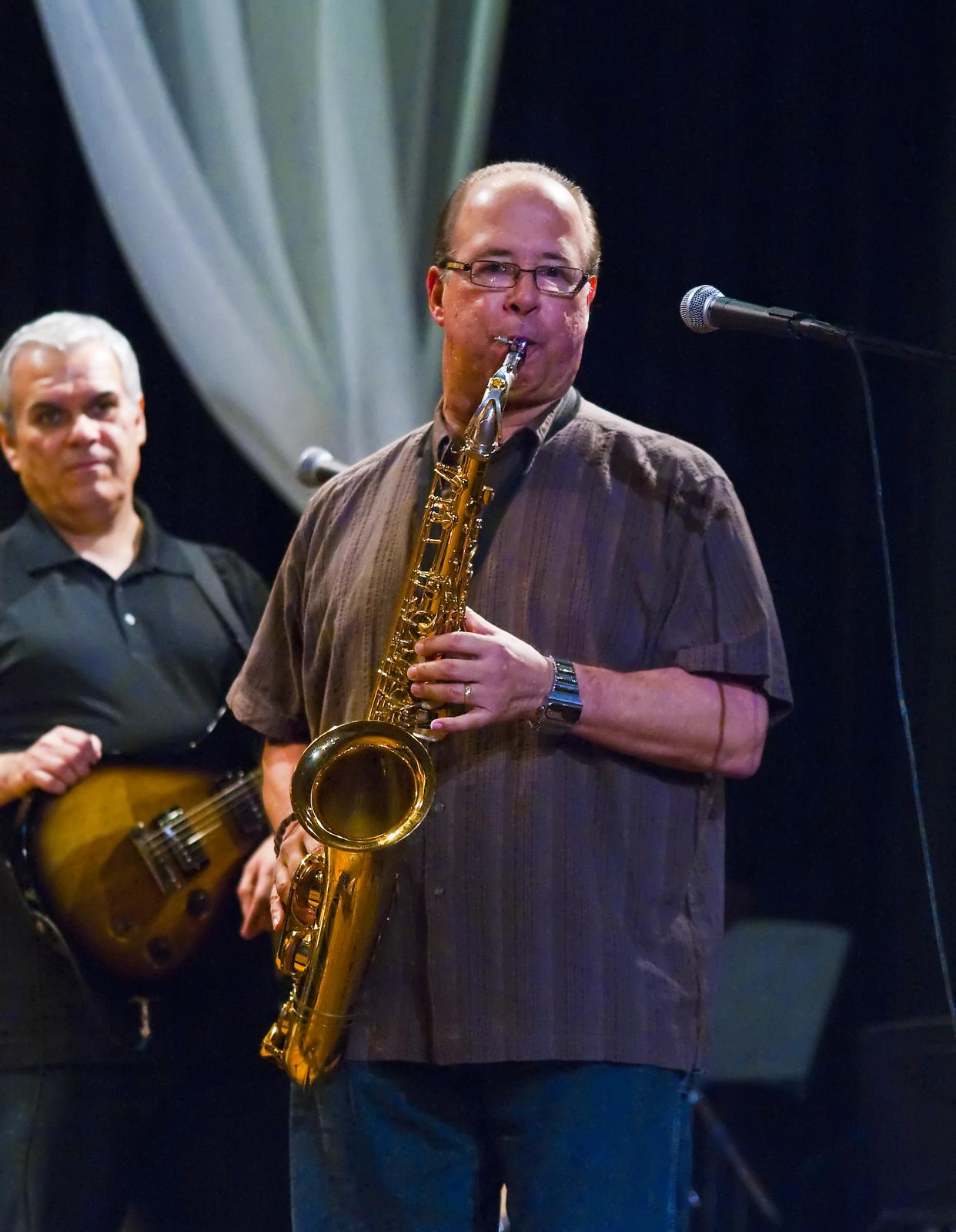
- Castillo in 2010

Background information
- Born: September 24, 1950 (age 75); Detroit, Michigan, U.S.
- Genres: Soul; funk
- Occupation: Musician
- Instruments: Saxophone; vocals; organ; guitar
- Years active: 1965–present

Emilio Castillo (born September 24, 1950) is an American saxophone player and composer, best known as the founder of the band Tower of Power.

== Background ==
In 1965, Emilio Castillo took to music after he and his brother Jack were caught stealing by his father who told him he could stay in his room until he thought of something to 'Keep him off the street'. Castillo and his brother chose music. Emilio chose saxophone and Jack chose drums.

He took lessons in saxophone, piano, and guitar, and also took lessons in music theory from one-time Dave Brubeck bass player Norman Bates. His first musical endeavor was in Extension Five which later became The Gotham City Crime Fighters due to the Batman craze at the time. He played both organ and sax. The group also consisted of his brother Jack on drums, Jody Lopez on guitar Frank “Rocco’ Houghton on bass (later going by the name of Francis Rocco Prestia), and Dave Genthner on vocals. In March, 1966 they released the song "Who Stole The Batmobile"

After seeing Bay Area soul band The Spyders, Castillo switched to saxophone and formed 'The Motowns' playing soul music covers.

After meeting baritone sax player Stephen "Doc" Kupka Castillo switched, on Kupka's suggestion, to performing original material and the band changed its name to 'Tower of Power'. The band recorded their first album, East Bay Grease, in 1970. Castillo has been with the band ever since, as leader and 2nd tenor saxophonist. He and Kupka are also responsible for writing many of the band's best-known songs.

== Work with other artists ==
He contributed to the track "Shoo-Fly" which was on José Feliciano's For My Love...Mother Music, released in 1974. Castillo and Stephen Kupka worked with Frankie B., producing both sides of the 1982 single "I'm A Midnight Mover" which was written by Bobby Womack and Wilson Pickett". He provided background vocals on "Who Do You Love" which was on Carlos Santana's 1983 album Havana Moon. Along with Stephen Kupka, Castillo co-composed the music for the song "Que Nivel De Mujer" which appears on the Aries album by Luis Miguel, released in 1993. He also played tenor saxophone on the track.
