= List of Occitans =

This is a non-exhaustive list of people who were born in the Occitania historical territory, or notable people from other regions of France or Europe with Occitan roots, or notable people from other regions of France or Europe who have other significant links with the historical region. One may note that this article, 'Notable people from Occitania', is compound for a large part of personalities from the historical region of Occitania and/or who own an Occitan patronym and/or who lived for the major part of their lives in the Occitania historical territory, yet an important part of the list members still can't be considered as belonging to the Occitan historical heritage, mainly due to their mother-tongue, French.

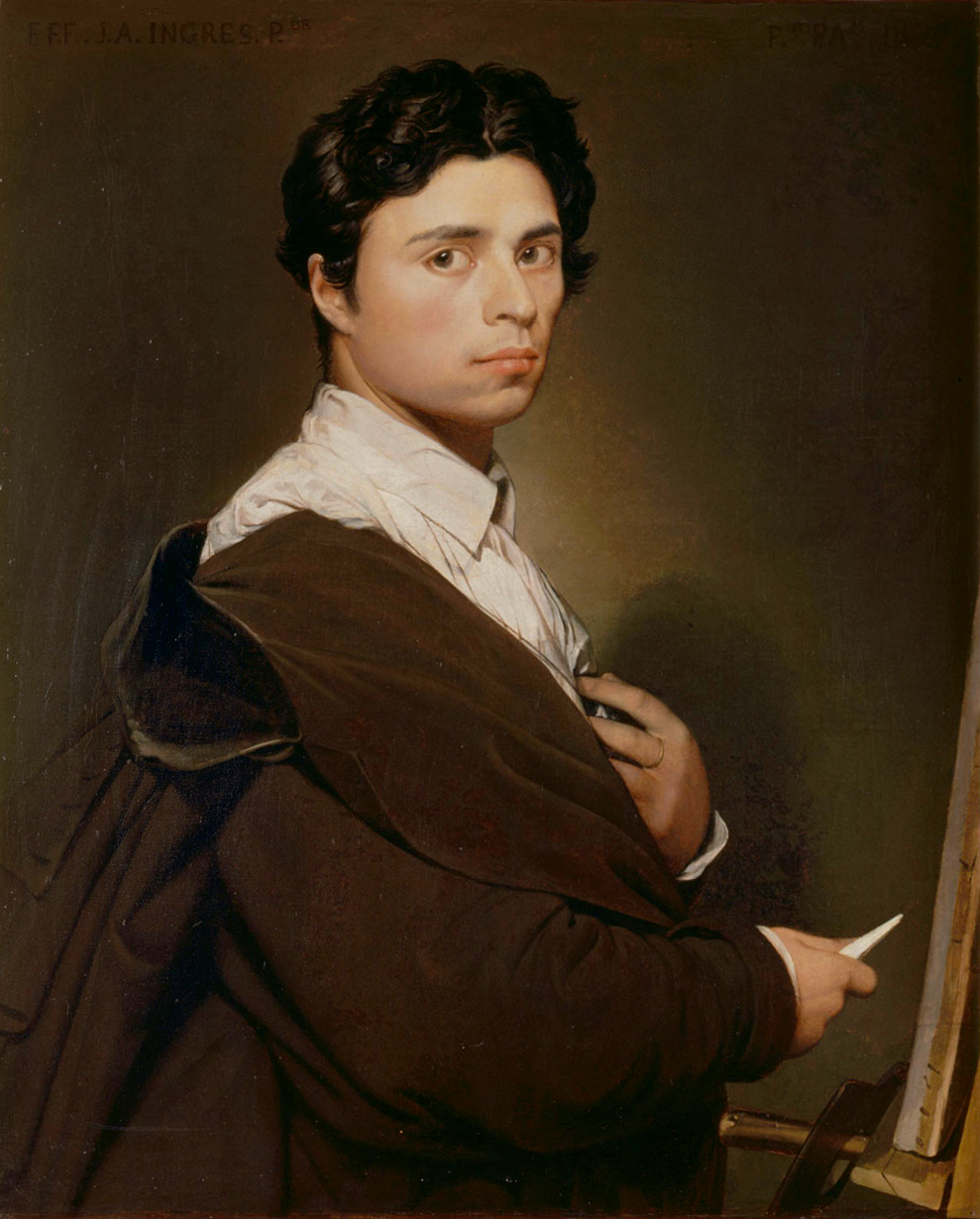
Dominique Ingres, Self-portrait.

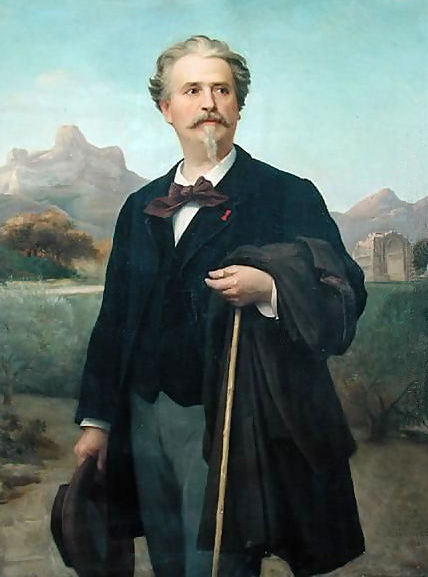
Frédéric Mistral, Symbol of the Occitan revival.

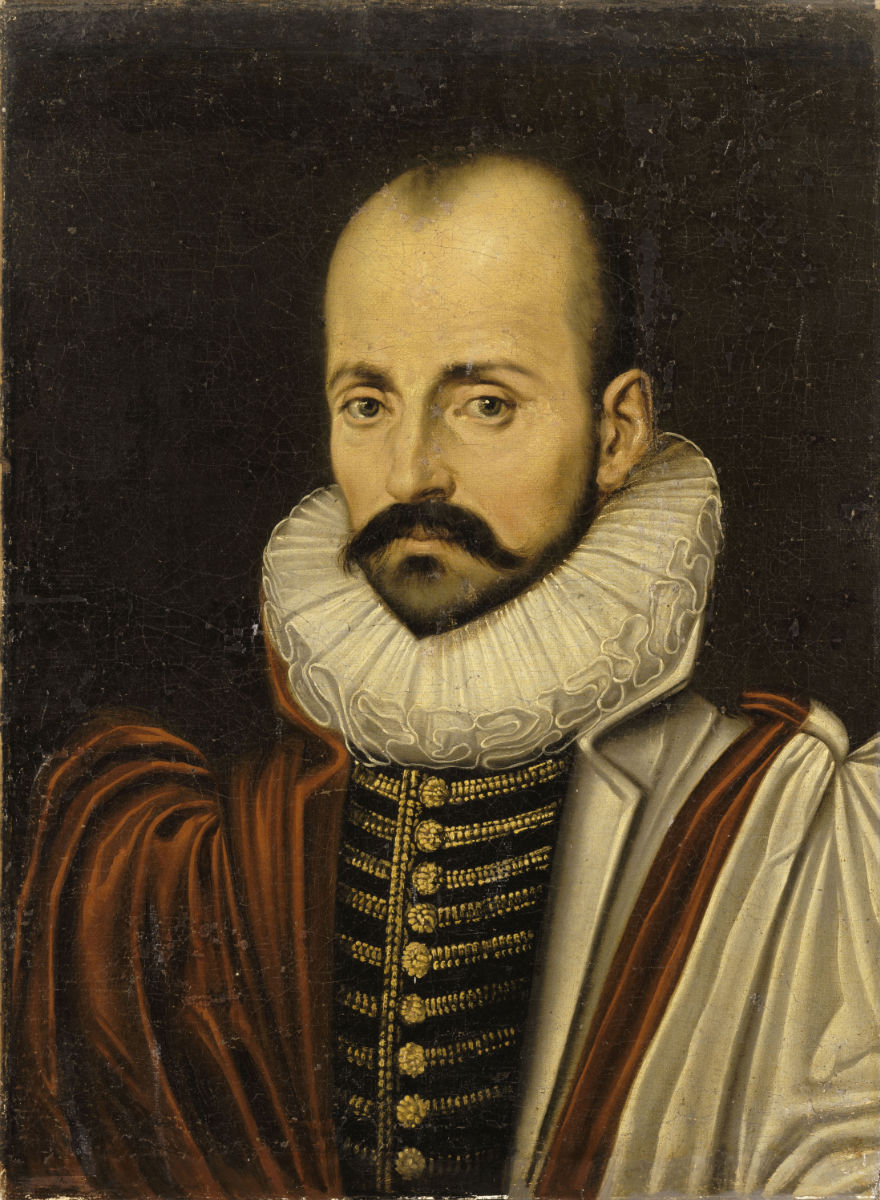
Montaigne, prominent thinker of the Renaissance.

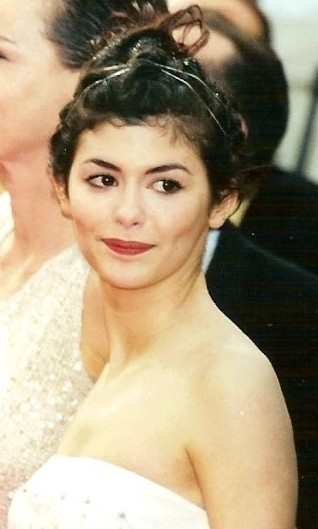
Audrey Tautou, famous actress and model.

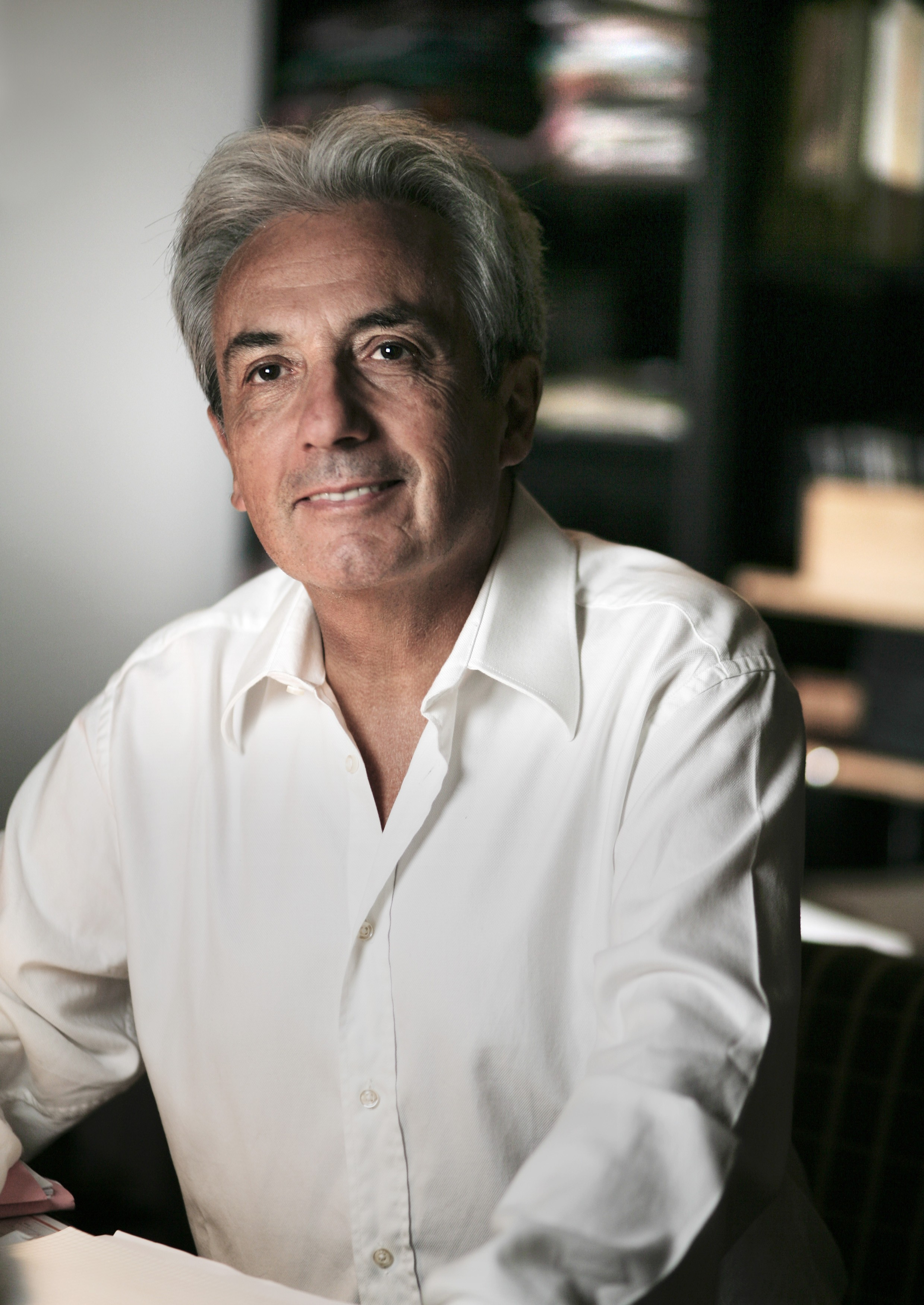
Albert Fert, 2007 Nobel Prize in Physics.

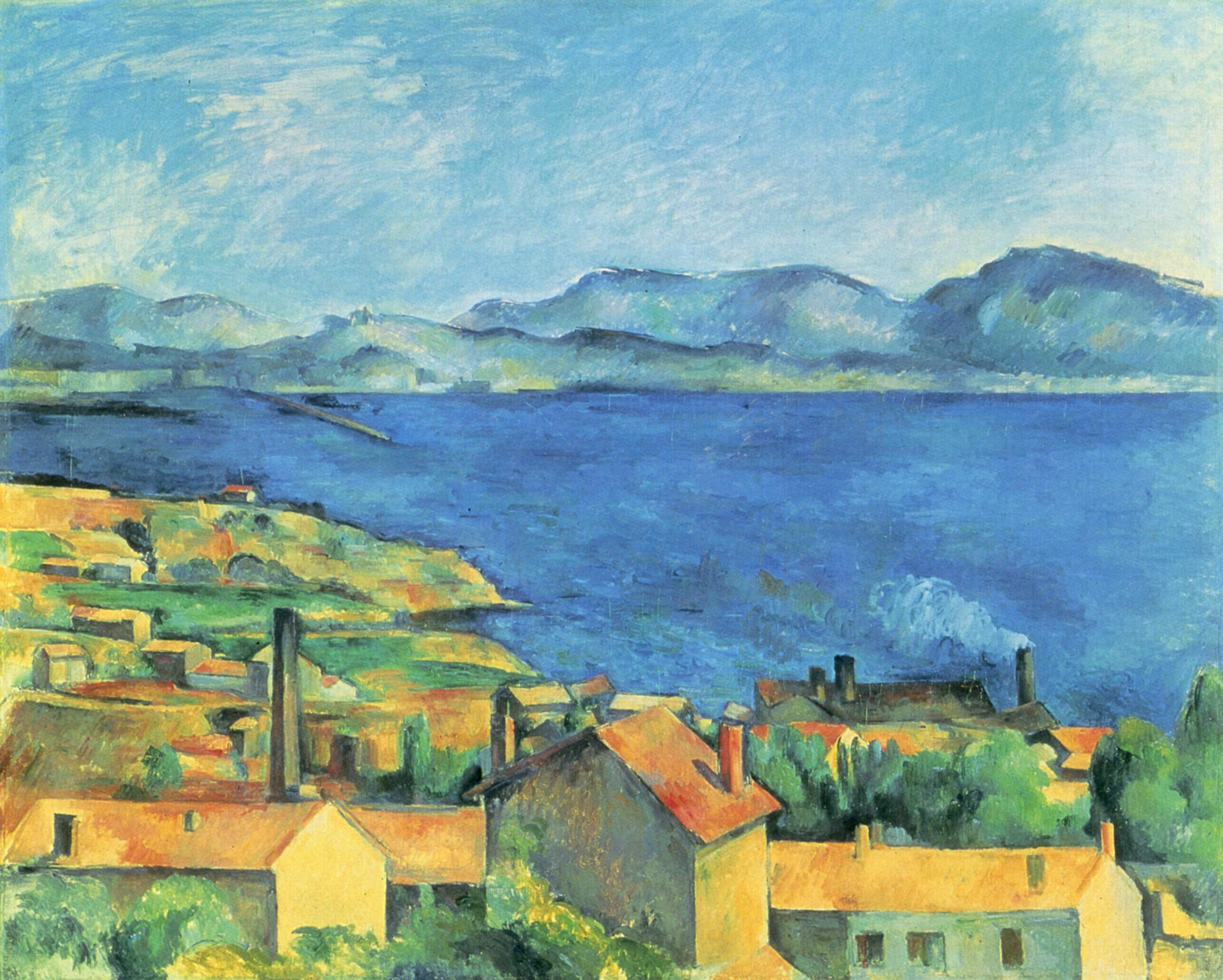
Paul Cézanne, Bay of Marseilles. Cézanne loved to paint his native Provence.

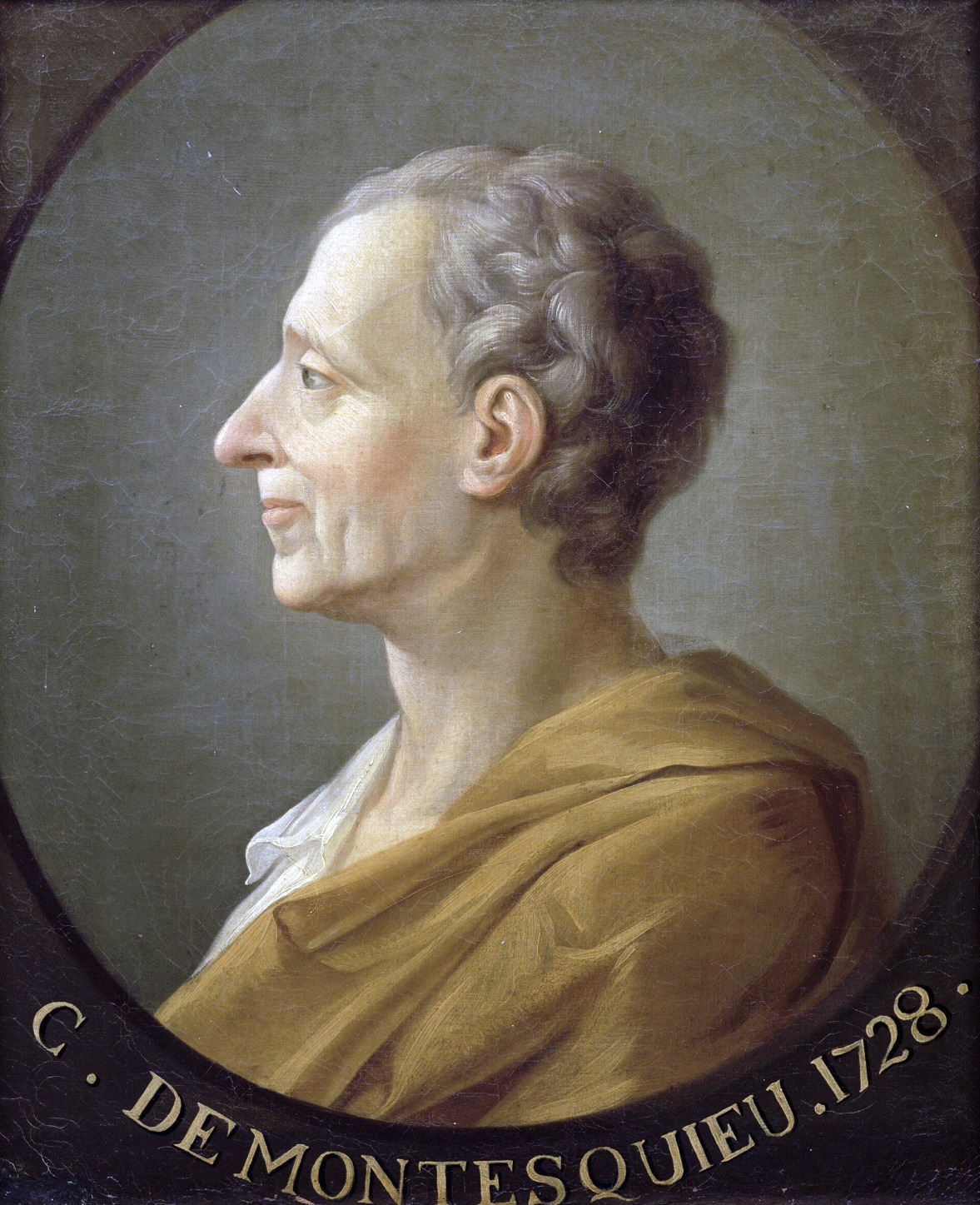
Montesquieu, a major figure of the Enlightenment.

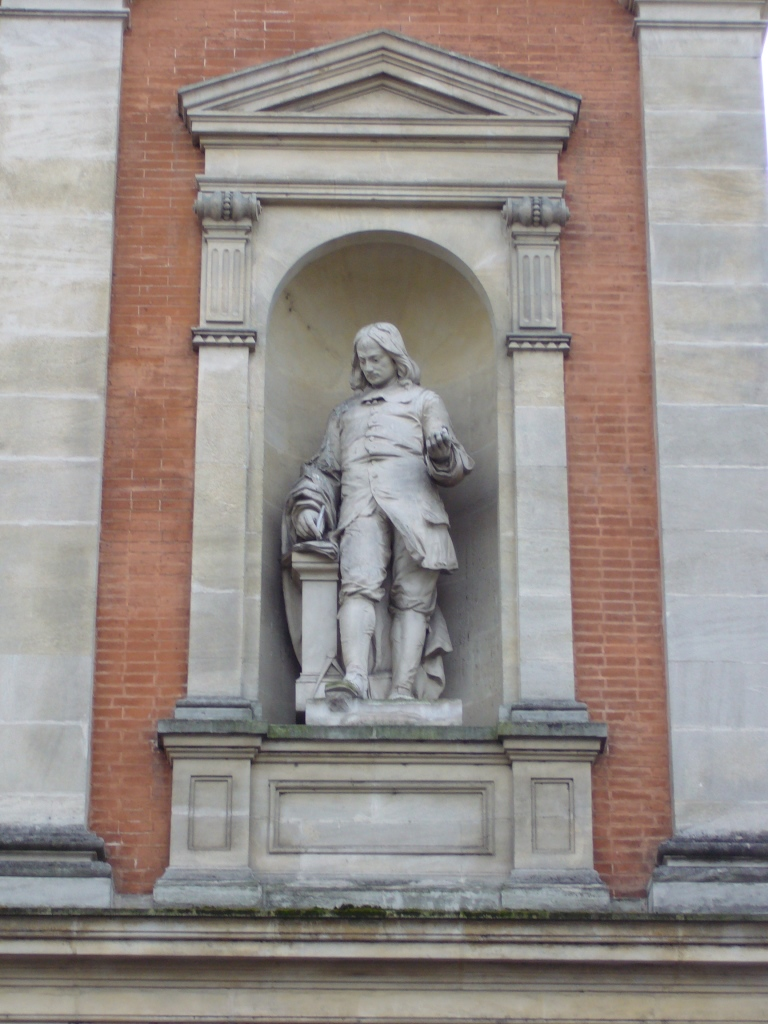
Pierre de Fermat, considered as one of the greatest French mathematicians of the Renaissance, who is given the Fermat's Last Theorem.

== Writers, playwrights and poets ==
- Petronius, courtier during the reign of Nero from Massalia, author of the Satyricon.
- Ausonius, 4th century Roman poet from Burdigalia.
- Bertran de Born, 12th century troubadour.
- William IX, Duke of Aquitaine, early troubadour and knight crusader.
- Marcabru, early 12th century troubadour.
- Monge de Montaudon, 12th century troubadour.
- Peire Vidal, early 13th century troubadour.
- Jaufre Rudel, major troubadour and crusader.
- Peire d'Alvernhe, second half of the 12th century troubadour.
- Comtessa de Dia, 12th century trobairitz (female troubadour).
- Raimbaut de Vaqueiras, 13th century troubadour and knight crusader during the Fourth Crusade.
- Arnaut Daniel, late 12th century major troubadour.
- Bernard de Ventadour, 12th century major troubadour.
- Peire Cardenal, 13th century troubadour.
- Antoine de la Sale, 15th century courtier, educator and writer.
- Mellin de Saint-Gelais, Poet Laureate of Francis I of France.
- Augièr Galhard, 16th century writer.
- Clément Marot, 16th century Renaissance poet.
- Théodore Agrippa d'Aubigné, early 17th century Baroque poet.
- Bartas, 17th century poet who wrote both in French and in Occitan.
- Honoré d'Urfé, 17th century Pastoral writer.
- Jean-Louis Guez de Balzac, 17th century Baroque author.
- La Rochefoucauld, 17th century moralist born in Paris to the famous noble Rochefoucauld family whose origins go back to Charente, where he had his residence.
- Théophile de Viau, 17th century Baroque poet and dramatist.
- Cyrano de Bergerac, 17th century novelist and playwright. He was from a Dordognaise aristocratic family from Bergerac, although he never lived there in his entire life.
- Fénelon, 17th century Renaissance writer.
- Nicolas Chamfort, 18th century poet, member of the Jacobin club.
- Marquis de Sade, 18th century aristocrat, revolutionary politician, philosopher, and writer. Born in Paris, he was the heir of the Provençal Sade house, one of the oldest family of the region. He was thus Lord of Saumane, Lacoste and Co-Lord of Mazan where he had several residences, including the famous Château de Lacoste.
- Marquis de Pompignan, 18th century man of letter.
- Luc de Clapiers, marquis de Vauvenargues, 18th century moralist.
- Baron de Montesquieu, an important writer and philosopher of the 18th century Enlightenment.
- Jean-François Marmontel, historian and novelist, member of the Encyclopédistes movement.
- Fleury Mesplet, founder of the Montreal Gazette (1778).
- André Chénier, late 18th century poet and figure of French Romanticism.
- Jansemin, 19th century Occitan language poet.
- Comte de Lautréamont, 19th century poet born in Uruguay to François Ducasse (consular officer) and his wife Jacquette-Célestine Davezac, both from Southwestern France from which they returned when Ducasse was thirteen, in Tarbes and later in Pau where the poet begun to write his first works.
- Émile Augier, 19th century dramatist.
- Honoré de Balzac, 19th century realist writer. Born in Tours, he was the son of Bernard François Balssa, an administrator from the Tarn department in South West France, who was despatched to Tours to coordinate supplies for the Army during the Directory. François changed his name to the more noble sounding Balzac, and his son Honoré later added — without official recognition — the nobiliary particle: "de". According to André Maurois and Philibert Auberrand, the original family name Balssa came from the radical bals which in Occitan means "steep rock". Another commonly admitted theory is that Balssa came from the Occitan balsan, derived from Late Latin balteanus, describing a horse with white patches on its paws.
- André Antoine, actor, theatre manager, film director, author, and critic as well as one of the leading member of the Naturalist movement.
- Théophile Gautier, 19th century poet and writer.
- Jules Vallès, 19th century writer.
- Émile Gaboriau, 19th century writer, journalist and novelist.
- Jules Laforgue, 19th century poet.
- Maurice de Guérin, 19th century poet.
- Alphonse Daudet, 19th century novelist.
- Pierre Loti, 19th century novelist and naval officer.
- Frédéric Mistral, 19th century and early 20th century Occitan-language poet and 1904 Nobel Prize in Literature winner. Chilean poet Gabriela Mistral chose her pen name after him.
- Théodore Aubanel, 19th century poet.
- Edmond Rostand, late 19th century playwright and novelist.
- Charles Maurras, late 19th century and 20th century influential poet, author and critic.
- Marguerite Genès 20th century woman of letters and teacher who wrote in Occitan and French.
- Saint-Pol-Roux, 20th century poet.
- Paul Valéry, 20th century poet.
- Jean Paulhan, 20th century writer and intellectual.
- Henri Bosco, 20th century writer.
- Pierre Reverdy, 20th century poet.
- André Gide, 20th century writer and 1947 Nobel Prize in Literature. Born in Paris, his family was from Uzès, in the Gard department. He was from an old Protestant family from Southern France. His father Paul Gide and his uncle Charles Gide, were both born in Uzès. Gide is a popular last name in the Gard and Bouches du Rhône departments.
- Francis Jammes, 20th century lyrical poet.
- Jean Giraudoux, 20th century novelist, essayist and playwright.
- Jules Romains, 20th century poet and writer, founder of the Unanimism literary movement.
- Francis Ponge, 20th century poet and essayist.
- Léon Bloy, Christian writer.
- Jules Supervielle, 20th century poet.
- Jean Anouilh, 20th century playwright.
- René Char, 20th century poet.
- François Mauriac, 20th century writer and 1952 Nobel Prize in Literature winner.
- Marcel Pagnol, 20th century writer.
- Marguerite Duras, 20th century writer. Born Marguerite Donnadieu in French Indochina, she chose her pen name after Duras, the commune her parents originated from, in the Lot-et-Garonne department.
- Jean Giono, 20th century writer.
- Antonin Artaud, 20th century dramatist, poet, essayist, actor, and theatre director.
- Pierre Boulle, 20th century writer.
- Margareta Priolo, 20th century writer, singer, teacher
- Françoise Sagan, 20th century novelist, screenwriter and playwright.
- Marcela Delpastre, 20th century Occitan-language writer.
- Jean Vilar, theatre director and actor, founder of the Festival d'Avignon.
- Anne Desclos, 20th century journalist and novelist.
- Joan Bodon, 20th century Occitan-language writer. His mother, Albanie Boudou (née Balssa), was said to be connected by blood with 19th century novelist Honoré de Balzac.
- Jean Echenoz, 20th century writer.
- Jean Lacouture, 20th century journalist, historian and author, known for his biographies of famous statesmen (including the likes of Charles de Gaulle and of Hô Chi Minh).
- J. M. G. Le Clézio, 20th century writer and poet, 2008 Nobel Prize in Literature winner.
- Philippe Sollers, 20th century writer and critic.
- René Barjavel, 20th century science fiction author.
- Renat Nelli, 20th century writer and founder of the Institut d'Estudis Occitans.
- Romain Puertolas, contemporary writer.
- Charles Dantzig, contemporary writer.

== Philosophers and thinkers ==
- Favorinus, Roman skeptical philosopher.
- Isaac the Blind, medieval kabbalistic philosopher.
- Samuel ibn Tibbon, medieval philosopher and doctor.
- Gersonides, medieval philosopher, Talmudist, mathematician, physician, astronomer and astrologer.
- Étienne de La Boétie, judge, writer and philosopher known for his Discourse on Voluntary Servitude.
- Michel de Montaigne, one of the most influential writers of the French Renaissance. He is known for popularizing the essay as a literary genre.
- Pierre Bayle, philosopher and writer, forerunner of the Encyclopedists and an advocate of the principle of the toleration of divergent beliefs, his works subsequently influenced the development of the Enlightenment.
- Pierre Gassendi, philosopher and mathematician. His best known intellectual project attempted to reconcile Epicureanism atomism with Christianity.
- Jean Domat, rationalist jurist.
- Blaise Pascal, mathematician, physicist, inventor, writer and Christian philosopher.
- Emmanuel Joseph Sieyès, essayist and political theorist of the French Revolution. He also made significant theoretical contributions to the nascent social sciences.
- Pierre Jean George Cabanis, 18th-century physiologist and Materialist philosopher.
- Auguste Comte, philosopher, he was a founder of the discipline of sociology and of the doctrine of positivism.
- Charles Bernard Renouvier, 19th-century philosopher.
- Lou Andreas-Salomé, female psychoanalyst, born in Russia to German parents from partly Huguenot descent that originated from Avignon.
- Jean Hyppolite, philosopher, known for championing the work of Georg Wilhelm Friedrich Hegel.
- Pierre Teilhard de Chardin, philosopher and Jesuit priest, who trained as a paleontologist and geologist and took part in the discovery of Peking Man. He conceived the idea of the Omega Point (a maximum level of complexity and consciousness towards which he believed the universe was evolving) and developed Vladimir Vernadsky's concept of noosphere.
- Louis Lavelle, 20th-century philosopher, influenced by Continental philosophy and Spiritualism.
- Jean Cavaillès, 20th-century philosopher and mathematician who took part in the French Resistance within the Libération movement. He came from a long line of Huguenot officers from the South West of France. His last name, Cavaillès, derivates from cavalh, the Occitan word for horse.
- Henri Lefebvre, 20th-century Marxist philosopher and sociologist.
- Jean-Paul Sartre, 20th-century philosopher, playwright, novelist and political activist. Born in Paris, his father originated from Thiviers, in Dordogne where young Sartre spent his holidays. His last name Sartre, came from "satre", the occitan word for "tailor".
- Paul Ricœur, 20th Century philosopher, best known for combining phenomenological description with hermeneutics.
- Maurice Merleau-Ponty, 20th-century phenomenological philosopher.
- Henri Lefebvre, Marxist philosopher and sociologist.
- Georges Canguilhem, philosopher and physician, specialized in the philosophy of science.
- Georges Bataille, 20th-century influential intellectual and literary figure.
- Pierre Bourdieu, sociologist, anthropologist and philosopher, his sociological work is dominated by the analysis of the reproduction mechanisms of the social hierarchies.
- Jean Wahl, 20th century existentialist philosopher and scholar.
- Michel Serres, 20th-century philosopher, his works are generally focused on the scientific progress and its effect on our society.
- Georges Dumézil, comparative philologist. He was born in Paris to a Girondin family from Bayon.
- René Girard, 20th-century anthropological philosopher, historian and literary critic.
- Jean Carbonnier, 20th century prominent jurist.
- Jacques Ellul, 20th-century philosopher, law professor, sociologist, lay theologian, and Christian anarchist.
- Alain Badiou, 20th-century marxist philosopher. Born in French Morocco, his father Raymond Badiou was mayor of Toulouse from 1944 to 1958. His last name, Badiou, comes from the Occitan badiu for simpleton.
- Daniel Bensaïd, 20th-century Trotskyist philosopher.
- Marcel Conche, contemporary philosopher, specialist of Heraclite and Pre-Socratic philosophy.
- Jean-Luc Nancy, contemporary philosopher.

== Scientists ==
- Tacitus, Roman historian, author of the Annals and the Histories, probably born in Gallia Narbonensis.
- Gennadius of Massilia, 5th century Christian priest, polemist, theologian and historian.
- Pope Sylvester II, prolific scholar and teacher who endorsed and promoted study of Arab and Greco-Roman arithmetic, mathematics, and astronomy, reintroducing to Europe the abacus and armillary sphere, which had been lost to Europe.
- Gregory of Tours, historian and Bishop of Tours. He is the main contemporary source for Merovingian history. His most notable work was his Decem Libri Historiarum or Ten Books of Histories, better known as the Historia Francorum ("History of the Franks").
- Guy de Chauliac, physician and surgeon, author of the influential treatise Chirurgia magna.
- Jean de Roquetaillade, Franciscan alchemist.
- Joseph Justus Scaliger, religious leader and scholar, considered as the father of chronology.
- Bernard Palissy, potter, Hydraulics engineer and craftsman, famous for his imitations of Chinese porcelain.
- Nostradamus, apothecary who published collections of prophecies that have since become famous worldwide. He was also a physician.
- Oronce Finé, mathematician and cartographer.
- Michel Rolle, mathematician, best known for the 1691 Rolle's theorem.
- Olivier de Serres, author and major soil scientist who promoted crop rotation as a way of preserving soil nutrients.
- Nicolas-Claude Fabri de Peiresc, astronomer, antiquary and savant.
- Alexandre de Rhodes, Jesuit missionary and lexicographer who published the first trilingual Vietnamese–Portuguese–Latin dictionary in 1651.
- Henri Pitot, hydraulic engineer, inventor of the Pitot tube and author of the Pitot theorem in plane geometry.
- Jean Astruc, professor of medicine, who wrote the first great treatise on syphilis and venereal diseases.
- Pierre de Fermat, amateur mathematician who is given credit for early developments that led to infinitesimal calculus, including his technique of adequality.
- Louis Bertrand Castel, mathematician and physician.
- Jean-Antoine Chaptal, chemist, physician, agronomist, industrialist, statesman, educator and philanthropist, discoverer of the chaptalizatio procedure.
- Louis Feuillée, botanist, astronomer and geographer.
- Michel Adanson, botanist and naturalist; the Adansonia, commonly known as the baobab tree, was named after him.
- Jean-Baptiste Denys, physician, notable for having performed the first fully documented human blood transfusion.
- Réaumur, scientist who contributed to many different fields, especially entomology and metallography.
- Joseph Pitton de Tournefort, one of the most prominent figure of the late 16th century Botany.
- Charles Plumier, botanist and botany explorer, after whom the frangipani genus Plumeria is named.
- François Laurent d'Arlandes, pioneer of hot air ballooning.
- Montgolfier brothers, inventors of the Montgolfière-style hot air balloon.
- Jean-Charles de Borda, mathematician and physicist, he developed the Borda count voting system and contributed to the construction of the standard metre, basis of the metric system.
- Joseph Louis Gay-Lussac, chemist and physicist, famous for his two gas laws.
- François Magendie, physiologist.
- Jean-Louis-Marc Alibert, notable dermatologist.
- Élie Cartan, notable mathematician, known for the closed-subgroup theorem, among other contributions to group theory and differential geometry.
- Eugène Rouché, mathematician, whom the Rouché's theorem was named after.
- Camille Jordan, mathematician, known for his works on group theory and for the Jordan curve theorem. The Jordans are a notable family from Die where Camille Jordan's father originated from.
- Édouard Goursat, mathematician, after whom was named the Goursat tetrahedron.
- Déodat Gratet de Dolomieu, notable geologist after whom was the Dolomite rock.
- François Mignet, historian and protagonist of the French Revolution about which he wrote a History of the French Revolution in 1824.
- Marc Seguin, engineer, inventor of the wire-cable suspension bridge and the multi-tubular steam-engine fire-tube boiler.
- Bernard de Montfaucon, Benedictine monk regarded as one of the founders of modern archaeology.
- Joseph-Ignace Guillotin, physician who proposed a painless method for executions that eventually inspired the guillotine.
- Gaspard-Gustave de Coriolis, mathematician, mechanical engineer and scientist known for the Coriolis effect. Born in Paris to a noble Provençal family, his uncle Honoré-Gaspard de Coriolis was a local Roman Catholic cleric and historian.
- Bertrand Pelletier, pharmacist and chemist.
- Jean-Baptiste Dumas, chemist, best known for his works on organic analysis and synthesis, as well as the determination of atomic weights (relative atomic masses) and molecular weights by measuring vapor densities.
- Marc René, marquis de Montalembert, military engineer.
- Philippe Pinel, physician who was instrumental in the development of a more humane psychological approach to the custody and care of psychiatric patients and pioneer of the moral therapy.
- Augustin Pyramus de Candolle, Swiss botanist, he came from one of the oldest noble families of Provence that moved to Switzerland at the end of the 16th century to escape religious persecution.
- Aimé Bonpland, explorer and botanist, who traveled with Alexander von Humboldt in Latin America from 1799 to 1804.
- Charles-Augustin de Coulomb, physician, author of the Coulomb's law. He gave the definition of the electrostatic force of attraction and repulsion, and did important work on friction.
- Jean-Baptiste Say, economist, famous for his law of markets. Born in Lyon, he was from a Protestant family who originated from Florac, in Lozère. The Say family moved to Nîmes after the revocation of the Edict of Nantes to finally reach Geneva, where his father was born. Say was a particularly popular last name in the Tarn-et-Garonne department at that time and its origins are quite murky.
- Antoine-François Bertrand de Molleville, politician and scientist, inventor of the secateurs.
- René Lesson, surgeon, naturalist, ornithologist, and herpetologist.
- Louis-Sébastien Lenormand, chemist, physicist, inventor and the first pioneer in modern parachuting in the world.
- Dominique Jean Larrey, considered as the first modern military surgeon.
- François-Vincent Raspail, chemist, naturalist, physician and political figure, founder of Cytochemistry.
- François Arago, important mathematician, astronomer and physicist.
- Jean Pierre Flourens, physiologist and a pioneer in anesthesia.
- Antoine Bussy, chemist, who is credited to have isolated the element beryllium, in 1828, the same year as Friedrich Wöhler.
- Élisée Reclus, renowned geographer, writer and anarchist, precursor of Social geography.
- Alphonse Borrelly, astronomer, who discovered an important number of asteroids and comets, including the periodic comet 19P/Borrelly.
- Philippe de Girard, uncredited inventor of the Tin canning process and inventor of the first flax spinning frame in 1810. The industrial town of Żyrardów in Poland was thus named after him.
- Antoine Jérôme Balard, chemist, one of the discoverers of bromine.
- Jean Marc Gaspard Itard, physician and pedagogue, notably credited with describing the first case of Tourette syndrome. He was also educator of the deaf, and experienced his theories in the celebrated case of Victor of Aveyron.
- Frédéric Bastiat, economist, classical liberalist, he developed the economic concept of opportunity cost, and introduced the Parable of the broken window.
- Pierre Frédéric Sarrus, mathematician, known for having developed the Sarrus linkage.
- Jean-François Champollion, decipherer of the Egyptian hieroglyphs.
- Paulin Talabot, railway and canal engineer.
- Pierre André Latreille, famous zoologist, specialising in arthropods.
- Antoine Marfan, one of the most important figures of modern pediatrics and first describer of the Marfan syndrome.
- Henri Fabre, aviator and inventor of the first successful seaplane, the Fabre Hydravion.
- Charles Cros, poet and inventor, best known for being the first person to conceive a method for reproducing recorded sound, an invention he named the Paleophone.
- Charles Gaudichaud-Beaupré, botanist who made several expeditions in Oceania and South America.
- Jean Cruveilhier, pathologist and anatomist.
- Joseph Monier, gardener and one of the principal inventors of reinforced concrete.
- Guillaume Dupuytren, anatomist and military surgeon.
- Gabriel Tarde, sociologist, criminologist and social psychologist who conceived sociology as based on small psychological interactions among individuals.
- Georges Sagnac, physicist who lent his name to the Sagnac effect.
- Édouard Roche, astronomer and mathematician, best known for his work in celestial mechanics.
- Paul-Émile Lecoq de Boisbaudran, chemist, discoverer of gallium, samarium and dysprosium.
- André-Louis Cholesky, mathematician and military officer, best known for the Cholesky decomposition in linear algebra.
- Jacques-Arsène d'Arsonval, physician, physicist, and inventor of the moving-coil D'Arsonval galvanometer and the thermocouple ammeter.
- Auguste Charlois, astronomer, who discovered around 99 asteroids.
- Jean Gaston Darboux, mathematician, he made several important contributions to geometry and mathematical analysis.
- Arthur Fallot, physician, who described in detail the four anatomical characteristics of the tetralogy of Fallot.
- Alphonse Beau de Rochas, engineer who originated the principle of the four-stroke internal-combustion engine.
- Émile Borel, mathematician, known for being along with Henri Lebesgue and René-Louis Baire one of the pioneers of the measure theory and its application to probability theory. He was also a politician and member of the French Resistance, and is regarded as one of the precursors of the European idea.
- Édouard Lartet, palaeontologist and one of the founders of modern palaeontology.
- Ernest Fourneau, medicinal chemist who made major contributions to the discovery of synthetic local anesthetics, as well as in the synthesis of suramin.
- Jean Favard, mathematician, best known for the Favard constant.
- Alfred Binet, psychologist who invented the first practical intelligence test, the Binet–Simon scale.
- Claude Gay, prominent botanist and naturalist of the Chilean flora.
- Michel Chevalier, engineer and economist.
- Joseph Valentin Boussinesq, mathematician and physician who made significant contributions to the theory of hydrodynamics and heat. He is the first developer of the Korteweg–de Vries equation.
- Albert Calmette ForMemRS, physician, bacteriologist and immunologist, who discovered the Bacillus Calmette–Guérin used in the BCG vaccine against tuberculosis and conceived the first antivenom for snake venom known as the Calmette's serum.
- Émile Duclaux, microbiologist and chemist.
- Louis Mékarski, engineer and inventor who patented the Mekarski system of compressed-air powered trams.
- Louis Arthur Ducos du Hauron, one of the pioneers of color photography.
- Jean-Henri Fabre, prominent entomologist.
- Gaston Planté, physicist who invented the lead–acid battery in 1859. The lead-acid battery eventually became the first rechargeable electric battery marketed for commercial use.
- Guillaume Bigourdan, astronomer who won the Gold Medal of the Royal Astronomical Society in 1919.
- Clément Ader, aviation precursor.
- Charles Fabry, physicist, co-inventor of the Fabry–Pérot interferometer.
- Bernard Brunhes, geophysicist who discovered the Earth's magnetic field reversals.
- Giuseppe Peano, Italian mathematician, best known for his works in logic, born in Coni, in Piedmontese Occitania.
- Georges Jean Marie Darrieus, aeronautical engineer and inventor of the Darrieus rotor.
- Paul Vidal de La Blache, one of the most prominent figure of modern French geography.
- Pierre Paul Émile Roux, physician, bacteriologist and immunologist as well as co-founder of the Pasteur Institute and responsible for the Institute's production of the anti-diphtheria serum.
- Eugène Freyssinet, structural and civil engineer, precursor of prestressed concrete.
- Paul Broca, physician, surgeon, anatomist, and anthropologist.
- Madeleine Brès, the first French woman, and one of the first in Europe, to obtain a medical degree.
- Paul Sabatier, chemist, awarded of the 1912 Nobel Prize in Chemistry along with Victor Grignard.
- Jean Cabannes, physicist, specializing in optics.
- Paul Dirac, English theoretical physicist who made fundamental contributions to the early development of both quantum mechanics and quantum electrodynamics. His paternal family originated from Dirac, in South West France, and moved to Switzerland after the revocation of the Edict of Nantes to finally join Bristol where Paul was born.
- Henri Dulac, mathematician who refined the Bendixson–Dulac theorem.
- Olinde Rodrigues, mathematician, best known for the Rodrigues' rotation formula in vectors.
- Marcellin Boule, palaeontologist.
- André Lichnerowicz, differential geometer and mathematical physicist.
- Jacques Cousteau, French naval officer and explorer who co-developed the Aqua-Lung, pioneered marine conservation and helped to popularize Oceanography throughout the world.
- Pierre Ossian Bonnet, mathematician, best known for the Gauss–Bonnet theorem.
- Paul Montel, mathematician, known for his notion of Normal family.
- Célestin Freinet, prominent pedagogue and educational reformer.
- Gaston Julia, mathematician, born in French Algeria to a Pyrenean family.
- René Grousset, historian and prominent specialist in Asian history.
- Germaine Tillion, ethnologist and Resistant.
- Jean Dausset, immunologist, awarded the 1980 Nobel Prize in Physiology or Medicine along with Baruj Benacerraf and George Davis Snell.
- Edmond Malinvaud, economist.
- Michel Raynaud, mathematician.
- Maurice Duverger, sociologist and jurist, who developed the Duverger's law.
- Alexander Grothendieck German-born French mathematician who grew up in Montpellier where he attended the municipal University and lived for the rest of his live in Ariège as a hermit, until his death in 2014.
- Alfred Sauvy, demographer, anthropologist and historian who first coined the term Third World.
- Jean-Marie Souriau, mathematician, known for works in symplectic geometry, in which he was one of the pioneers.
- Jean-Pierre Serre, mathematician, who made fundamental contributions to algebraic topology, algebraic geometry, and algebraic number theory. He was awarded the Fields Medal in 1954, the Wolf Prize in 2000 and the Abel Prize in 2003, making him one of four mathematicians to achieve this (along with Pierre Deligne, John Milnor, and John G. Thompson).
- Jacques Le Goff, historian and eminent specialist of the Middle Ages, most specifically the 12th and 13th centuries.
- André Neveu, physicist who co-invented the Neveu–Schwarz algebra and the Gross–Neveu model.
- Jacques-Louis Lions, mathematician, awarded of the 1991 Japan Prize and Harvey Prize. He is listed as an ISI highly cited researcher. He was elected president of the International Mathematical Union in 1991.
- Robèrt Lafont, linguist.
- Frank Merle, mathematician, specializing in partial differential equations and mathematical physics, awarded of the 2005 Bôcher Prize.
- Albert Fert, physicist, one of the discoverers of giant magnetoresistance which brought about a breakthrough in gigabyte hard disks, awarded of the 2007 Nobel Prize in Physics, together with Peter Grünberg.
- Alain Connes, mathematician, who revolutionized the Von Neumann algebra, resolving major problems on this field, notably the classification of the Type III factors. He was awarded of the 1982 Fields Medal.
- Pierre-Paul Grassé, zoologist.
- Bernard Gregory, physicist, former director-general of CERN.
- Christian Metz, film theorist and semiologist.
- Pierre-Louis Lions, mathematician, who received the 1994 Fields Medal for his works on nonlinear partial differential equations.
- Michel Talagrand, mathematician, specializing in functional analysis and probability theory.
- Alain Colmerauer, computer scientist and creator of the logic programming language Prolog.
- Michel Broué, mathematician, specializing in algebraic geometry and representation theory.
- Cédric Villani, mathematician, awarded of the 2010 Fields Medal for his works on partial differential equations and mathematical physics.
- Jean-Jacques Laffont, economist, specializing in public economics and information economics, he was awarded of the 1993 Yrjö Jahnsson prize along with his colleague and collaborator Jean Tirole.
- Jean-Loup Chrétien, retired Général de Brigade (brigadier general) in the Armée de l'Air (French air force), and former CNES spationaut.
- Henry de Lumley, notable contemporary archeologist and prehistorian.
- Alain Carpentier, surgeon, who is given credit for the development of the first fully implantable artificial heart.
- Alfred A. Tomatis, prominent otolaryngologist and inventor.
- André Turcat, Air Force pilot and test pilot.
- Catherine Cesarsky, astronomer and former president of the International Astronomical Union.
- Boris Cyrulnik, doctor, ethologist, neurologist, and psychiatrist.
- Alain Aspect, physicist, known for his works on Bell test experiments.
- Bernard Maris, economist, murdered on 7 January 2015, during the Charlie Hebdo shooting.
- Haïm Brezis, mathematician, fellow of the American Mathematical Society since 2012.
- Arnaud Denjoy, mathematician, who first defined the Denjoy integral.
- Jérôme Rota, software developer, co-founder of DivX, Inc.
- Thierry Aubin, mathematician, leading expert on Riemannian geometry.
- Lucien Le Cam, mathematician, best known for Le Cam's theorem in probability theory.
- Jean-Jacques Moreau, mathematician and mechanician. He discovered the helicity invariant in fluid dynamics.
- Jacqueline Ferrand, mathematician, who mainly worked on Riemannian manifolds.
- Jacques Marescaux, surgeon, believed to be the first one in the world to operate a person without leaving a scar.

== Artists ==
- Trophime Bigot, late 16th century Baroque painter.
- Pierre Puget, 17th century Baroque painter and sculptor.
- Louis-Michel van Loo, 18th century painter and portraitist.
- Jean-Honoré Fragonard, 18th-century rococo painter and printmaker.
- Claude Joseph Vernet, 18th-century painter.
- Jean-Auguste-Dominique Ingres, 19th-century neoclassical painter.
- Auguste Renoir, 19th-century artist, one of the leading painter in the development of the Impressionist style.
- Henri de Toulouse-Lautrec, 19th-century Post-Impressionist painter, printmaker, draughtsman and illustrator.
- Rosa Bonheur, 19th-century realist painter.
- Frédéric Bazille, 19th-century Impressionist painter.
- William-Adolphe Bouguereau, 19th-century academic painter.
- Odilon Redon, 19th-century symbolist painter, printmaker, draughtsman and pastellist.
- Alexandre Cabanel, 19th-century academic painter.
- Jean-Paul Laurens, 19th-century academic painter and sculptor.
- Honoré Daumier, printmaker, caricaturist, painter, and sculptor, whose many works offer commentary on social and political life in France in the 19th century.
- Paul Cézanne, 19th-century post-impressionist painter whose work laid the foundations of the transition from the 19th-century conception of artistic endeavour to a new and radically different world of art in the 20th century.
- Suzanne Valadon, 19th-century and early 20th-century.
- Arthur Batut, early 20th-century photographer and pioneer of aerial photography.
- Eugène Atget, early 20th-century photographer, regarded as one of the pioneer of documentary photography.
- Sem, early 20th-century caricaturist.
- Albert Marquet, 20th-century Fauvist painter.
- Aristide Maillol, 20th-century sculptor, painter and printmaker.
- Antoine Bourdelle, 20th-century sculptor, painter, and teacher.
- Yves Klein, 20th-century artist, considered an important figure in post-war European art.
- César, 20th-century sculptor and member of the Nouveau Réalisme.
- Arman, 20th-century painter, sculptor and printmaker, member of the Nouveau Réalisme.
- Lucien Clergue, photographer.
- Edmund Dulac, magazine illustrator and stamp designer.
- Pierre Soulages, painter, engraver and sculptor.
- Jean Dieuzaide, photographer.
- Sempé, cartoonist.
- Daniel Goossens, cartoonist.

== Architects ==
- Guillaume Cammas, 18th-century painter and architect, author of the Capitole de Toulouse's facade.
- Jean-Baptiste Michel Vallin de la Mothe, who became Catherine II official court architect and mainly worked in Saint-Petersburg.
- Jean Nouvel, he obtained the Aga Khan Award for Architecture, the Wolf Prize in Arts in 2005 and the Pritzker Prize in 2008.
- Pascal Coste, architect, who knew success in his hometown of Marseille.
- Dominique Perrault, urban planner and architect, known for the design of the French National Library.
- Paul Andreu, architect, known for his designs of airports.

== Musicians ==
- Jean de Sainte-Colombe, 17th century celebrated master of the Viol.
- André Campra, late 17th century and early 18th century composer and conductor.
- Jean-Joseph de Mondonville, 18th century composer and violinist.
- Gabriel Fauré, 19th- and early 20th-century Post-romantic composer and organist.
- Déodat de Séverac, 19th- and early 20th-century Impressionist composer, influenced in his works by his native Languedoc.
- Aristide Cavaillé-Coll, 19th-century prominent organ builder.
- Emmanuel Chabrier, 19th-century Romantic composer.
- Hortense Schneider, 19th-century operetta star.
- Marius Petipa, 19th-century influential ballet choreographer.
- Joseph Canteloube, 20th-century composer and musicologist.
- André Messager, 20th-century composer.
- Lily Pons, 20th-century popular Opera soprano.
- Georges Auric, 20th-century composer. Member of Les Six.
- Darius Milhaud, 20th-century composer and teacher. Member of Les Six.
- Emma Calvé, Belle Époque star soprano.
- Olivier Messiaen, 20th-century composer and organist.
- Michel Petrucciani, 20th-century jazz pianist.
- Maurice Ravel, 20th-century composer, pianist and conductor.
- David Fray, classical pianist.
- Jean-Claude Malgoire, 20th century conductor.
- Maurice Béjart, prominent choreographer and opera director.
- Maurice André, trumpeter.
- Benjamin Millepied, dancer and choreographer.
- Les Ablettes, 20th-century punk rock band.
- Alidé Sans
- Alonzo
- Marcel Amont, 20th-century French singer and Occitan-language songwriter.
- Ève Angeli
- Art Mengo
- Thierry Amiel
- The Avener, DJ and music producer.
- Gilbert Bécaud, 20th-century singer.
- Priscilla Betti
- Guy Bonnet, 20th-century Occitan-language songwriter.
- Boulevard des Airs
- Georges Brassens, 20th-century songwriter, known for its poetic lyrics and using of black humor.
- Alan Braxe, electronic music artist.
- Francis Cabrel, 20th-century singer and songwriter.
- Cécilia Cara
- Cats on Trees
- Chinese Man, trip hop band.
- Cocoon
- Collectif Métissé, Soma Riba.
- Caroline Costa
- Lou Dalfin
- Emma Daumas
- Anne-Marie David, singer and winner of the 1973 Eurovision Song Contest.
- Rosina de Pèira
- Dionysos
- Diabologum
- Julien Doré, singer and songwriter.
- Eiffel
- Pauline Ester, 20th-century singer.
- Eths
- Fabulous Trobadors
- Faf Larage
- Fascagat
- Félicien Taris
- Fréro Delavega
- Gojira, heavy metal band.
- Gold
- Goulamas'k
- Gipsy Kings
- Hyphen Hyphen, electro-pop band.
- IAM, late 20th-century hip hop band.
- Images
- Imany
- Jean-Roch, influential DJ.
- Joanda
- Jul
- Kaolin
- Marina Kaye
- Kazero
- Kid Wise
- Kungs
- Francis Lai, award-winning composer.
- La Femme, psych-punk rock band.
- La Mal Coiffée, occitan vocal band.
- Jean-Jacques Lafon, 20th-century singer.
- Marie Laforêt, 20th-century singer.
- Francis Lalanne, 20th-century singer.
- Serge Lama, 20th-century singer.
- Boby Lapointe, 20th-century singer.
- M83, electro band.
- Jean-Pierre Mader, 20th-century singer.
- Christophe Maé, singer and songwriter.
- Mans de Breish, 20th-century Occitan-language songwriter.
- Mélissa Mars
- Claude Marti, 20th-century Occitan-language songwriter.
- Massilia Sound System
- Mireille Mathieu, 20th-century singer.
- Møme
- Moos
- Jean-Joseph Mouret, composer from the Baroque era.
- Jean-Louis Murat, singer and songwriter.
- Los de Nadau, Occitan-language band from Gascony (Béarn), one of the main band of Nòva cançon in the 1970s.
- Les Naufragés, Spi et la Gaudriole, folk band (ex-OTH).
- Noir Désir, 20th-century rock band.
- Claude Nougaro, 20th-century singer and songwriter.
- Oai Star
- OTH, 20th-century punk rock band.
- Patric, 20th-century Occitan-language songwriter.
- Sabine Paturel
- Panzer Flower, electro-pop band.
- Partenaire Particulier, electronic and new wave band.
- Pierre Perret, 20th-century singer and songwriter.
- Stéphane Pompougnac, DJ and record producer.
- Sylvie Pullès
- Regg'Lyss
- Rinôçérôse
- Ringo, 20th-century singer.
- Dick Rivers, 20th-century singer.
- Gaëtan Roussel
- Olivia Ruiz
- Patrick Sébastien, 20th-century singer.
- Hélène Ségara, 20th-century singer.
- Jean Ségurel
- Émilie Simon, singer and composer of electronic music.
- Soko, singer and songwriter.
- Soprano
- Stéphanie
- Stille Volk
- Michèle Torr, 20th-century singer.
- Charles Trenet, 20th-century singer and songwriter.
- Wazoo
- Zebda

== Statesmen, entrepreneurs, religious figures and activists ==
- Lucius Caesar, grandson and heir of Augustus who unexpectedly died at the age of 18, compelling Augustus to redraw the line of succession by adopting Tiberius.
- Marcus Antonius Primus, Roman senator who took an important part as a general in the 69 Civil war.
- Saint Sebastian, early Christian saint and martyr from Gallia Narbonensis.
- Victor of Marseilles, saint of the Catholic Church and the Eastern Orthodox Church.
- Saint Faith, saint and martyr during Diocletian persecution of the Christians.
- Constantine II, Roman Emperor from 337 to 340.
- Alaric II, second king of the Visigoths.
- Saint Eligius, Catholic Saint and Patron saint of the goldsmiths.
- Gesalec, king of the Visigoths from 507 to 511.
- William I of Provence, Count of Provence, leader of the 973 Battle of Tourtour that expelled the Al-Andalusi pirates out of Fraxinetum.
- Raymond of Saint-Gilles, a prominent Crusader, participated in the First Crusade and the Crusade of 1101 and founded the County of Tripoli, starting a line of Occitan Counts ruling there. He was also Count of Toulouse.
- Richard I of England, 12th-century King of England, spent most of his life in Aquitaine and spoke Occitan language. He was an important patron of the troubadours.
- Garsenda, 12th-century countess and trobairitz.
- Eleanor of Aquitaine, 12th-century Duchess of Aquitaine, Queen consort of France and later Queen consort of England, often regarded as one of the wealthiest and most powerful women in western Europe during the High Middle Ages.
- Beatrice de Planissoles, Cathar minor noble.
- Saint Roch, Catholic saint and confessor.
- Bernard Gui, Papal inquisitor, diplomat and historian.
- Pope Clement V, Pope from 5 June 1305 to 1314, he started the Avignon Papacy.
- Pope John XXII, Pope from 1316 to 1334.
- Pope Benedict XII, Pope from 1334 to 1342.
- Pope Clement VI, Pope from 1342 to 1352.
- Pope Innocent VI, Pope from 1352 to 1362.
- Pope Urban V, Pope from 1362 to 1370.
- Pope Gregory XI, Pope from 1370 to 1379 and last Avignon Pope.
- Richard II of England, 14th- century King of England who inspired William Shakespeare's play.
- William Farel, evangelist, Protestant reformer and a founder of the Reformed Church in the Principality of Neuchâtel and in the Republic of Geneva.
- Francis I of France, 16th-century first King of France from the Angoulême branch who paved the way for the French Renaissance.
- Marguerite de Navarre, 16th-century princess of France and patron of Humanists and reformers. She is sometimes regarded as the "First Modern Woman" due to her independence and important role in the spreading of the Renaissance in the French Kingdom.
- Jeanne d'Albret, 16th-century Queen regnant of Navarre and a key-figure of Protestantism in France.
- Henry IV of France, 16th-century King of France, known as Le Bon Roi Henri (Good King Henry), he remains one of the most emblematic King of France, notably for having been raised in the Protestant faith.
- Vincent de Paul, Roman Catholic priest who dedicated himself to serving the poor.
- Jean Nicot, diplomat and scholar who introduced snuff tobacco to the French royal court. The tobacco plant, Nicotiana, a flowering garden plant, was named after him by Carl Linnaeus, as was nicotine.
- Henri Arnaud, 17th-century pastor of the Waldensians in Piedmont.
- Pierre-Esprit Radisson, explorer and fur trader, co-founder of the Hudson's Bay Company.
- Olympe de Gouges, 18th-century activist, known as one of the pioneer of Feminism.
- Louis de Bonald, 18th-century politician, a counter-revolutionary and conservator, known for his social theories that would later inspire Sociology.
- Paul Barras, main executive leader of the Directory regime.
- Étienne Charles de Loménie de Brienne, churchman, politician and finance minister of Louis XVI.
- Honoré Gabriel Riqueti, comte de Mirabeau, leader of the early stages of the French Revolution.
- Jean Jacques Régis de Cambacérès, nobleman and lawyer, who headed the special commission in charge of establishing the Napoleonic Code.
- Charles XIV John (Jean Bernadotte), 19th-century Jacobines leader, Marshal of France, later King of Sweden and Norway (as Charles III in the latter), founder of the House of Bernadotte, the current royal family of Sweden.
- Désirée Clary, Queen of Sweden and of Norway.
- Adolphe Thiers, statesman, who came to epitomize by his life-long political career — during which he served under the monarchy, the republic and the Empire — the tumultuous dynamics of the 19th century politics in France.
- Louis Auguste Blanqui, socialist and political activist, notable for his revolutionary theory of Blanquism.
- François Guizot, historian, orator and statesman, key figure in French politics prior to the Revolution of 1848.
- Léon Gambetta, 19th-century Prime minister of France, a prominent political figure during and after the difficult period of the Franco-Prussian War, viewed as a humiliation by the French. He was also the proclaimer of the Third Republic.
- Bernadette Soubirous, Christian mystic and Saint. After her visions, Lourdes went on to become a major pilgrimage site.
- Charles Dupuy, 19th-century statesman, three times Prime Minister of France.
- Marie François Sadi Carnot, 19th-century statesman and fifth president of the Third Republic.
- Charles de Freycinet, early 20th-century statesman, four times Prime Minister of France.
- Théodore Steeg, 20th-century Radical politician.
- Armand Fallières, 20th-century statesman and president of the French republic from 1906 to 1913.
- Jean Jaurès, 20th-century statesman and one of the most important figure of the French Left.
- Émile Combes, statesman, who led the French Left political coalition Bloc des gauches's cabinet from June 1902 – January 1905.
- Gaston Doumergue, 20th-century statesman. He was the 13th President of France.
- Vincent Auriol, 20th-century French president. He was the first president of the Fourth Republic.
- André and Édouard Michelin, industrialists and founders of the Compagnie Générale des Établissements Michelin in 1888 in Clermont-Ferrand.
- Édouard Daladier, French Radical politician and Prime Minister of France at the start of the Second World War.
- François Darlan, 20th-century Prime Minister of France during the pro-German Vichy regime.
- Jean Moulin, hero of the French resistance.
- Gabriel Péri, Communist journalist and prominent Resistant, arrested and shot by the German occupier at the Forteresse du Mont-Valérien.
- Marie-Madeleine Fourcade, Resistant.
- Georges Loustaunau-Lacau, Resistant.
- Germaine Tillion, Resistant.
- Claude de Baissac, agent of the Special Operations Executive.
- Begum Om Habibeh Aga Khan, fourth and last wife of Sir Sultan Muhammad Shah, Aga Khan III.
- Jean Monnet, 20th-century political economist and diplomat. He is regarded by many as the chief architect of European unity and the founding father of the European Union.
- René Cassin, 1968 Nobel Peace Prize for his work in drafting the Universal Declaration of Human Rights, adopted by the United Nations United Nations General Assembly on 10 December 1948.
- Georges Pompidou, 20th-century French president.
- Jeanne Calment, supercentenarian who has the longest confirmed human lifespan on record.
- Henrik, Prince Consort of Denmark, husband of Queen Margrethe II.
- Valéry Giscard d'Estaing, 20th-century French president.
- Simone Veil, 20th-century lawyer and politician, survivor from the Auschwitz-Birkenau concentration camp, she is primary known as the mother of the law legalizing abortion in France on 17 January 1975.
- Jean-Luc Lagardère, founder and former CEO of the Lagardère Group.
- François Mitterrand, President of France from 1981 to 1995. He was, therefore, the longest-serving President of France and the first one from the Left under the Fifth Republic.
- Claude Bébéar, founder and former CEO of AXA.
- Bernard Kouchner, politician and physician, co-founder of Medecins Sans Frontiers.
- Michel Camdessus, applied economist and managing director of the IMF from 1987 to 2000, which makes him the longest serving managing director of this international institution.
- Lucien Barrière, heir and founder of the Lucien Barrière group.
- François Bayrou, leader of the centrist political party MoDem.
- Francis Bouygues, businessman and film producer, founder of Bouygues.
- Ives Roqueta, Occitan-language author and activist.
- Max Roqueta, Occitan-language activist, former president of the Institut d'études occitanes (Occitan research Institute).
- Daniel Cohn-Bendit, French-German politician.
- Michel Ancel, video game designer, creator of the Rayman game series.
- Frédérick Raynal, video game designer, creator of 1992 game Alone in the Dark.

== Sport and dance ==
- Marie Sallé, 18th century dancer.
- Jules Léotard, 19th century Acrobatic performer who developed the art of trapeze.
- Madame Saqui, 19th century popular funambulist.
- Mathieu Ganio, Danseur Étoile of the Paris Opera Ballet.
- Bernard Laporte, rugby union coach and former French Secretary of State for Sport. He was head coach of the France national team, the head coach at Rugby Club Toulonnais and president of the French Rugby Union.
- Claude Onesta, handball coach and responsible of France's Men's handball team since 2001. He has won titles in major competitions such as The Olympics, The World Championship, and The European Championship.
- Claude Puel, current head coach of the OGC Nice.
- Louis Chiron, successful first half of the 20th century racing driver, after whom was named the Bugatti Chiron.
- Gustave Sandras, gymnast, first Olympic gold medal in gymnastics of all time, in 1900.
- Jean-Pierre Rives, former rugby union footballer. "A cult figure in France," according to the BBC, he came to epitomise the team's spirit and "ultra-committed, guts-and-glory style of play. He was awarded the Order of the Legion of Honor and was inducted into the International Rugby Hall of Fame. He is one of the most emblematic rugby union footballers of all time and described by Australian actor Hugh Jackman as "A small guy on the field, he finished every game with blood on face".
- Philippe Sella, former rugby league and rugby union footballer. An important figure of the French rugby union team as well as the London Saracens. He later became a member of the International Rugby Hall of Fame in 1999 and the IRB Hall of Fame in 2008.
- Several rugby union footballers are members of the IRB Hall of Fame such as Jean Prat, Jo Maso and André Boniface as well as contemporary players like Yannick Jauzion, Fabien Pelous, William Servat, Cédric Heymans, Maxime Médard, Aurélien Rougerie, Dimitri Szarzewski, Yoann Huget and Hugo Bonneval.
- Adolphe Bousquet, two times Olympic medalist in rugby union.
- Daniel Elena, rally co-driver of Sébastien Loeb who owns the most victories in the history of the WRC.
- Guy Lacombe, 1984 Olympic champion in football.
- François Borde, Olympic medalist in rugby union.
- Several professional swimmers such as Olympic champions Camille Lacourt, Clément Lefert, Alain Bernard and Yannick Agnel.
- Renaud Lavillenie, pole vaulter, Olympic champion, and current world record holder.
- Tony Estanguet, slalom canoeist, multiple times Olympic gold medalist.
- Colette Besson, Olympic champion athlete.
- Joël Bouzou, 1987 World Champion of modern pentathlon.
- Herman Georges Berger, fencer, 1908 Olympic champion in épée competition.
- Nicole Duclos, athlete.
- Joseph Guillemot, Olympic champion long-distance runner.
- Stéphane Diagana, world champion athlete.
- Sébastien Ogier, rally driver and current holder of the World Rally Drivers' Championship.
- Nicolas Vouilloz, former rally driver.
- Gustave Garrigou, cyclist and Tour de France winner.
- Antonin Magne, cyclist and Tour de France winner.
- Roger Lapébie, cyclist and Tour de France winner.
- Jean-Christophe Péraud, cyclist, second of the 2014 overall Tour de France.
- Raymond Poulidor, iconic cyclist, known as The Eternal Second.
- Romain Bardet, cyclist.
- Manuel Busto, cyclist.
- Jules Merviel, cyclist.
- Lucien Aimar, cyclist who won the 1966 Tour de France.
- Charles Coste, cyclist and Olympic medalist.
- Johanne Defay, surfer who won three World Surf League events.
- Guillaume Néry, free-diver.
- Alain Giresse, retired international footballer and member of the Euro 84 winning team.
- Eric Cantona, former International footballer and important player of Manchester United F.C. in the mid-1990s.
- David Ginola, former international footballer.
- Zinedine Zidane, former international footballer.
- Laurent Blanc, former international footballer.
- Didier Deschamps, former international footballer.
- Vincent Candela, former international footballer.
- Fabien Barthez, former international footballer.
- Johan Micoud, former international footballer and member of the Euro 2000 winning team.
- Gaël Clichy, international footballer, currently plays for Manchester City F.C..
- Philippe Mexès, international footballer, currently plays for Milan.
- Samir Nasri, international footballer, currently plays for Manchester City F.C..
- Mathieu Flamini, international footballer, currently plays for Arsenal F.C..
- Aymeric Laporte, professional footballer, currently plays for Athletic Bilbao.
- Blaise Matuidi, international footballer, currently plays for Paris Saint-Germain.
- Lucas Hernandez, international footballer, currently plays for Atlético Madrid.
- Hugo Lloris, international footballer, currently plays for Tottenham Hotspur F.C..
- Laurent Koscielny, international footballer, currently plays for Arsenal F.C..
- Several handball players such as Xavier Barachet, Michaël Guigou, William Accambray, Théo Derot and Jérôme Fernandez.
- Richard Gasquet and Gilles Simon, tennis players.
- Alexandra Lacrabère, female handball player.
- Thomas Heurtel, international basketball player from Anadolu Efes Istanbul.
- Louis François, Greco-Roman wrestler.
- Céline Dumerc, Sandrine Gruda and Paoline Salagnac, female basketball players.
- Yoann Jaumel, Earvin N'Gapeth, Pierre Pujol and Kévin Tillie, international volleyball players.
- Martin Fourcade, Olympic champion biathlete.
- Adrien Hardy, Olympic medalist rower.
- Brigitte Guibal, Olympic medalist slalom canoer.
- Marion Bartoli, former professional tennis player and winner of the 2013 Wimbledon Championships singles title.
- Pierre Jonquères d'Oriola and Christian d'Oriola, Olympic medalists in fencing.
- Jérémie Azou, Olympic champion in rowing.
- Guy de Luget, Olympic medalist in fencing.
- Dominique Sarron and Christian Sarron, Grand Prix motorcycle road racers.
- Gabriella Papadakis, Olympic medalist in ice dancing.
- Émilie Andéol, judoka.
- Martin Braud and Cédric Forgit, slalom canoer.
- Annie Famose, Alpine skier and Olympic medalist.
- Marielle Goitschel, Alpine skier and Olympic champion.
- Isabelle Delobel, ice dancer.
- François Gabart, professional offshore yacht racer who won the 2012–13 Vendée Globe.
- Audrey Prieto, female freestyle wrestler.
- Gauthier de Tessières, alpine ski racer.
- Emmanuel Hostache, 1999 Olympic champion in bobsleigh.
- Claude Piquemal, athlete.
- Wilfrid Forgues, Olympic medalist slalom canoer.
- René Thomas, early 20th-century motor racing champion.
- Mathieu Crépel, professional snowboarder.
- Isabelle Blanc, snowboarder and Olympic champion.
- Erwann Le Péchoux, world champion in fencing.
- Marie-Laure Brunet, Olympic biathlete.
- Xavier de Le Rue, big mountain snowboarder.
- Doriane Vidal, snowboarder and Olympic medalist.
- Pierre Vaultier, snowboarder and Olympic champion.
- Marie Marvingt, athlete, mountaineer, aviator and journalist.
- Johann Zarco, Grand Prix motorcycle racer.
- René Arnoux, motor racing driver.
- Joris Daudet, cyclist, 1997 and 2016 World Cup overall title winner in BMX.
- Cyril Abidi, kickboxer.
- Jules Bianchi, motor racing driver.
- Puig Aubert, prominent rugby league figure.
- Richard Tardits, former American football linebacker for the New England Patriots of the NFL.
- Boris Bede, Canadian football player.
- Bruce Bochy, former baseball player and current manager of the San Francisco Giants.
- Jehan Buhan, Olympic champion in foil competition.
- Jacques Lataste, two times Olympic champion in the team foil competition.
- Jean-Claude Magnan, Olympic champion in foil competition.
- Pascale Trinquet, Olympic champion in foil competition.
- Brigitte Latrille-Gaudin, Olympic champion in the team foil competition.
- Lionel Plumenail, Olympic champion in the team foil competition.
- Roger François, 1928 Olympic champion in weightlifting.
- Jean-Noël Ferrari, Olympic champion in the team foil competition.
- Guy Lapébie, cyclist, two times Olympic Champion in 4000m team pursuit and in Team road race.
- Arnaud Geyre, racing cyclist, Olympic champion in cycling at the 1956 Summer Olympics men's team road race.
- Serge Maury, sailor, 1972 Olympic champion in the finn class.
- Gaston Aumoitte, Olympic champion in Croquet.
- Maurice Larrouy, Olympic champion in Shooting.
- Marguerite Broquedis, 1912 Olympic champion in tennis.
- Jean Boiteux, 1952 Olympic champion in freestyle swimming.
- Camille Muffat, 2012 Olympic champion in freestyle swimming.
- Henri Deglane, Olympic champion in Greco-Roman wrestling.
- Marie-Claire Restoux, 1996 Olympic champion in judo.
- Boris Sanson, Olympic champion in team fencing.
- Nicolas Lopez, Olympic champion in team fencing.
- André Labatut, Olympic champion in the foil and épée competitions.
- René Bougnol, Olympic champion in the team foil event.
- Émile Coste, Olympic champion in the individual foil event.
- Pierre Durand, Jr., 1988 Olympic champion in equestrian individual jumping.
- Jean Teulère, Olympic champion in equestrian team eventing.
- Charles Coste, 1948 Olympic champion in team puruit.
- Fernand Decanali, 1948 Olympic champion in team pursuit.
- Frank Adisson, 1996 Olympic champion in slalom canoeing.
- Benoît Peschier, 2004 Olympic champion in slalom canoeing.
- Sébastien Vieilledent, Olympic champion in rowing.
- Charles Leclerc, racing driver.
- Michel Andrieux 2000 Olympic champion in rowing.
- Laurent Porchier, Olympic champion in rowing.
- Bernard Malivoire, Olympic champion in rowing.
- Virginie Dedieu, Olympic medalist in synchronized swimming.
- Jean-Philippe Gatien, Olympic silver medalist in table tennis.
- Astier Nicolas and Mathieu Lemoine, Olympic champion during the 2016 equestrian Team eventing
- Dominique Gardères, horse rider, 1900 co-Olympic champion in the high jump event.
- Didier Courrèges, horse rider, co-Olympic champion in 2004. He was born in Normandy from a Béarnais background, and grew up in Pau.
- Denis Gargaud Chanut, Olympic champion in slalom canoeing.
- Lucas Puig, Adidas-sponsored skateboarder, who made appearance in the Electronic Arts's games Skate It, Skate 2 and Skate 3.
- David Roumieu, rugby union footballer.
- Richard Jouve, Olympic medalist in Cross-country skiing.
- Perrine Laffont, Olympic champion in mogul skiing.
- Jack LaLanne, American fitness expert, he came from a Béarnais background from Oloron-Sainte-Marie.

== Cinema and actors ==
- William Abadie, actor.
- Ariane Ascaride, actress and screenwriter.
- Lionnel Astier, film and television actor, famous for his role of Léodagan in Kaamelot. Lionnel Astier is the father of Alexandre Astier.
- Jacques de Baroncelli, film director of the Silent film era.
- Emmanuelle Béart, actress and model.
- Bertrand Bonello, film director, member of the New French Extremity movement.
- Sandrine Bonnaire, actress, film director and screenwriter.
- Charles Boyer, 20th-century actor who had a successful carrier at Hollywood where he played in movies like The Garden of Allah along with actresses such as Marlene Dietrich and Hedy Lamarr.
- Robert Bresson, 20th-century film director and probably the most influential figure of the French New Wave.
- Capucine, fashion model and actress.
- Georges Carrère, actor.
- Jean-Claude Carrière, screenwriter, actor and Academy Award honoree.
- André Cayatte, film director from the Nouvelle Vague who won two Golden Lions in 1950 and 1960.
- Nicolas Cazalé, actor and model.
- Timothée Chalamet, American actor. His father's side is from Nîmes. He spent his holidays in the family house of Le Chambon-sur-Lignon.
- Delphine Chanéac, model and actress.
- René Clément, director and screenwriter.
- Mireille Darc, actress and model.
- Danielle Darrieux, actress and pop icon who had a successful carrier at Hollywood.
- Dugazon, late 18th century theater actor.
- François Dupeyron, film director and screenwriter.
- Jean Eustache, film director.
- Fernandel, 20th-century actor and singer, who played in classic French, Italian and later American movies such as Paris Holiday or again Around the World in 80 Days.
- Louis Feuillade, 20th-century director of the silent film era.
- Rémi Gaillard, famous YouTube prankster.
- Michel Galabru, actor.
- Armand Gatti, playwright, screenwriter and filmmaker.
- Robert Guédiguian, film director, screenwriter, producer and actor.
- Alain Guiraudie, film director and screenwriter.
- Mylène Jampanoï, actress.
- Louis Jourdan, film and television actor.
- Lou de Laâge, television, film and stage actress.
- Bernadette Lafont, actress, famous for her role in 1960s Nouvelle Vague movies.
- Georges Lautner, film director.
- Philippe Léotard, actor, poet and singer.
- Jean-Xavier de Lestrade, award-winning film director.
- Max Linder, 20th-century actor, director, screenwriter, producer and comedian of the Silent film era.
- Jean-Pierre Malo, actor.
- Simone Mareuil, actress, best known for her role in Luis Buñuel movie Un Chien Andalou.
- Gilles Marini, actor.
- Jean-Baptiste Maunier, actor and singer.
- Jean-Pierre Mocky, film director, actor, screenwriter and producer.
- Michel Modo, actor.
- Édouard Molinaro, film director and screenwriter.
- Clara Morgane, pornographic actress.
- Paul Mounet, actor of the early silent film era.
- Géraldine Pailhas, actress.
- Gina Palerme, actress and dancer of the silent film era.
- Gérard Philipe, actor.
- Maurice Pialat, film director and screenwriter.
- Raimu, actor.
- Georges Riquier, actor.
- Éric Rohmer, 20th Century film director and one of the most important members of the French New Wave.
- Henri Serre, Nouvelle Vague actor.
- Maurice Ronet, actor, director, and writer.
- Pierre Schoendoerffer, film director, screenwriter, writer, war reporter and war cameraman who won the Academy Award for Documentary Feature for The Anderson Platoon.
- Barbara Schulz, actress.
- Simone Simon, actress.
- Audrey Tautou, actress and model, she achieved international recognition for her lead role in the 2001 film Amélie (2001), and later played in movies such as Stephen Frears's Dirty Pretty Things (2002) and Ron Howard's The Da Vinci Code (2006).
- André Téchiné, film director from the late Nouvelle Vague who won the Best Director Award at Cannes Film Festival.
- Jean-Louis Trintignant, actor, screenwriter and film director.
- Jean Vigo, major film director, born in Paris to Languedocian anarchist parents (Miguel Almereyda).
- Pierre Woodman, major pornographic films director.

== Men of war and explorers ==
- Pytheas, Greek geographer from Massalia, who made a voyage of exploration to northwestern Europe in about 325 BC.
- Vercingetorix, chieftain of the Arverni tribe who fought against Roman forces during the last phase of Julius Caesar's Gallic Wars at the Battle of Gergovia. He was probably born either in Gergovie or Nemossos (nowadays part of Clermont-Ferrand).
- Avitus, Western Roman Emperor from 8 or 9 July 455 to 17 October 456.
- Euric, King of the Visigoths from 466 until his death in 484.
- Paulinus of Nola, Roman poet, writer and senator.
- Odo the Great, Duke of Aquitaine, one of the leader of the 732 Battle of Tours.
- Lupus II of Gascony, Duke of Gascony and commander of the Battle of Roncevaux Pass in 778.
- William II Sánchez of Gascony, Duke of Gascony from circa 961 at least until 996, he fought during the Reconquista. He is mainly known to have perpetrated a major defeat of the Vikings at Taller in 982.
- Adhemar of Le Puy, one of the major figures of the First Crusade, known for having carried the Holy Lance during the Siege of Antioch in which he took a decisive part.
- Raymond IV, Count of Toulouse, one of the leaders of the First Crusade.
- Gaston IV, Viscount of Béarn, viscount of Béarn and soldier during the First Crusade.
- Mercadier, warrior and chief of mercenaries in service of Richard I, King of England.
- James I of Aragon, King of Aragon, Count of Barcelona, and Lord of Montpellier from 1213 to 1276; King of Majorca from 1231 to 1276; and Valencia from 1238 to 1276.
- Isabella of Angoulême, queen consort of England from 1200 until John's death in 1216.
- Jean Poton de Xaintrailles, minor noble who was appointed Marshal of France and who distinguished himself during the Hundred Years' War, notably at the Battle of Gerberoy.
- John II, Duke of Bourbon, commander of the decisive Hundred Years' War Battle of Formigny.
- La Hire, major military commander of the late the Hundred Years' War and leader of the Battle of Patay.
- Jean III de Grailly, captal de Buch, one of the main commander of the Hundred Years' War who was attached to the English side.
- Gaston of Foix, Duke of Nemours, military commander who took brilliantly part in the War of the League of Cambrai.
- Jacques de La Palice, nobleman and military commander.
- Bertrand de Blanchefort, sixth Grand Master of the Knights Templar, remembered to have been an important reformer of the Order.
- Odo de St Amand, eighth Grand Master of the Knights Templar, remembered for his numerous victories, the most famous one being the victory of the Battle of Montgisard against Saladin.
- Guillaume de Sonnac, Grand Master of the Knights Templar, who fought at the Siege of Damietta died at the Battle of Al Mansurah.
- Armand de Périgord, Grand Master of the Knights Templar, defeated at the Battle of La Forbie.
- Bayard, legendary soldier, sometimes known as "the knight without fear and beyond reproach".
- Pierre d'Aubusson, Grand Master of the order of St. John of Jerusalem and revered by all Christendom as "the Shield of the Church". He was the leader of the 1480 Siege of Rhodes defence.
- Blaise de Lasseran-Massencôme, seigneur de Montluc, Marshal of France, knighted after his service during the Battle of Ceresole.
- Guigues Guiffrey, soldier, who won fame through his cavalry charge during the Battle of Ceresole.
- Louis des Balbes de Berton de Crillon, soldier, nicknamed the man without fear.
- Jean Parisot de la Valette, 49th Grand Master of the Order of Malta, from 21 August 1557 to his death in 1568. Knight Hospitaller, he joined the order in the Langue de Provence, he fought with distinction against the Turks at Rhodes. He commanded the resistance against the Ottomans at the Great Siege of Malta in 1565. Valletta, capital of Malta was named after him.
- Samuel de Champlain, navigator, cartographer, draughtsman, soldier, explorer, geographer, ethnologist, diplomat, and chronicler, considered as the "Father of New France".
- Jean-Vincent d'Abbadie de Saint-Castin, military leader in New France, who illustrated himself in the raid of Penobscot and the Battle of Falmouth during the King William's War.
- Louis de Buade de Frontenac, soldier and Governor general of New France from an old noble family from Béarn, who successfully defended Quebec from the British invasions of the King William's War.
- Isaac de l'Ostal de Saint-Martin, chevalier, in service of the Dutch Republic.
- Jean de Gassion, Gascon military, commander at the 1643 battle of Rocroi.
- Jean-François Roberval, adventurer and first Lieutenant General of New France.
- Pierre Dugua, Sieur de Mons, merchant, explorer and colonizer who founded the first permanent French settlement in Canada.
- Charles d'Artagnan, legendary captain of the Musketeers of the Guard who inspired Alexandre Dumas' d'Artagnan character.
- Armand d'Athos, Isaac de Porthau, and Henri d'Aramitz, members of the Musketeers of the Guard who inspired Alexandre Dumas for his 1844 novel The Three Musketeers.
- Vicomte of Turenne, member of the Auvergnat La Tour d'Auvergne family, who distinguished himself during the battles of Nördlingen, Zusmarshausen, Turckheim and Dunes.
- Daniel Montbars, buccaneer, known as Montbars the Destroyer.
- Jean-Baptiste du Casse, buccaneer, admiral, and colonial administrator.
- Antoine Laumet de La Mothe, sieur de Cadillac, explorer and adventurer in New France, In 1701, he founded Fort Pontchartrain du Détroit, the beginnings of modern Detroit, which he commanded until 1710. William H. Murphy and Henry M. Leland, founders of the Cadillac auto company in Detroit, paid homage to him by using his name for their company and his armorial bearings as its logo in 1902.
- Claude-Jean Allouez, Jesuit missionary and French explorer of North America, mainly Michigan and Wisconsin.
- Pierre Laclède, fur trader who, with his young assistant and stepson Auguste Chouteau, founded St. Louis in 1764.
- Marguerite Delaye, heroine of the Siege of Montelimar, during the French Wars of Religion.
- Louis-Joseph de Montcalm, commander of the forces in North America during the Seven Years' War, whose North American theatre is known as the French and Indian War in the United States.
- François Joseph Paul de Grasse, admiral, known for his command of the French fleet at the Battle of the Chesapeake, which led directly to the British surrender at Yorktown.
- Jean-François de La Pérouse, officer of the Royal French Navy. He was chosen by the Marquis de Castries and Louis XVI to lead an expedition around the world to complete James Cook discoveries in the Pacific Ocean. This maritime expedition mysteriously vanished, body and soul, at Vanikoro (Santa Cruz Islands) in 1788, three years after his departure from Brest. Numerous places were named after him, including the La Pérouse Strait between Russia and Japan.
- Armand de Gramont, Comte de Guiche, soldier and adventurer.
- Claude Louis Hector de Villars, general of Louis XIV who illustrated himself during the commanding of the Battle of Malplaquet.
- Claude de Forbin, naval commander who illustrated himself during the War of the Spanish Succession and the Nine Years' War, as well as ephemeral governor of Bangkok and challenger of the Makassar revolt of 1686.
- Hippolyte Bouchard, sailor and corsair, praised in Argentina.
- Nicolas-Louis d'Assas, captain of the Régiment d'Auvergne and hero of the Battle of Kloster Kampen.
- Lafayette, general and key figure of the American Revolutionary War. He was a close friend of George Washington. He is sometimes known as the Hero of the Two Worlds.
- John Ligonier, 1st Earl Ligonier, British soldier who became Commander-in-Chief of the Forces in 1757.
- Louis de Freycinet, navigator who published in 1811 the first map to show a full outline of the coastline of Australia.
- Guillaume Brune, Marshal of France who distinguished himself as Brigadier general during the late Revolutionary period battles of Castricum and Pozzolo.
- Louis-Thomas Villaret de Joyeuse, admiral.
- Jean Lafitte, French-American pirate and privateer in the Gulf of Mexico who took part in the 1815 Battle of New Orleans.
- Louis-René Levassor de Latouche Tréville, Vice-admiral who fought during the American Revolutionary War and under Napoleon during the Raids on Boulogne.
- Michel de Beaupuy, soldier during the French Revolutionary Wars.
- Several Marshals of France of the Napoleonic Era, including Joachim Murat, Jean Lannes, Jean-Baptiste Bessières, Jean-Baptiste Jourdan or again André Masséna and Jean-de-Dieu Soult.
- Joseph Lagrange, successful soldier of the Napoleonic Era.
- Jean-Louis-Brigitte Espagne, Napoleonic cavalry commander.
- Honoré Charles Reille, Napoleonic Marshal, leader of the Battle of Roncesvalles and key figure of the Peninsular War.
- Jean-Antoine Marbot, Napoleonic General and politician.
- Jacques Gervais, baron Subervie, Napoleonic general and politician.
- Pierre Claude Pajol, Napoleonic cavalry general.
- Adolphe Marbot, Napoleonic General, remembered for his courage as a soldier in the Battle of Vitebsk.
- Marcellin Marbot, Napoleonic General, remembered for his Mémoires and his role as a soldier during the Battle of Eylau.
- Louis Desaix, general and military leader who distinguished himself during the Napoleonic Egyptian campaign.
- Jean Étienne Championnet and Édouard Jean Baptiste Milhaud, major generals of the Napoleonic Era.
- Pierre François Sauret, General of Division under Napoleon who mainly fought during the War of the Pyrenees.
- Pierre Daumesnil, one-legged soldier of Napoleon.
- François Certain Canrobert, Marshal of France, one of the leaders of the allied forces during the Crimean War, notably in the Battle of Inkerman and the Siege of Sevastopol.
- Pierre Bosquet, Marshal of France, who particularly served during the Crimean War and the conquest of Algeria.
- Thomas Robert Bugeaud, Marshal of France and Governor-General of Algeria primary remembered for his key role during the conquest of Algeria and the Battle of Isly.
- Jean-Joseph Ange d'Hautpoul, cavalry general of the Napoleonic Wars.
- Jean Danjou, decorated captain who fought during the legendary Battle of Camarón.
- Abel Douay, general, killed in combat during the Battle of Wissembourg where the French defenders, although greatly outnumbered, fought heroically.
- Joseph Gallieni, highly decorated soldier, commander and administrator. He took back Madagascar from the rebels in 1896 and played an important role on the French side during the First World War.
- Marcel Treich-Laplène, first explorer and first colonial administrator of the Ivory Coast.
- Ferdinand Foch, Marshal of France, of Poland and of United Kingdom. Hero of the First World War, Addington says, "to a large extent the final Allied strategy which won the war on land in Western Europe in 1918 was Foch's alone."
- Maurice Sarrail, general of the First World War, one of the commanders of the Salonica breakthrough.
- Albert Severin Roche, distinguished French soldier, nicknamed by Foch "the first soldier of France".
- Noël Édouard, vicomte de Curières de Castelnau, notable general in the First World War, famous for his victories during the Battle of Grand Couronné, the Battle of the Trouée de Charmes and the Battle of Verdun.
- Adolphe Guillaumat, general in the First World War, who took part as a commander in the Battle of Verdun, among other battles.
- Émile Fayolle, successful First World War general, appointed Marshal of France.
- Robert Nivelle, commander-in-chief of the French armies on the Western Front, who was responsible of the inconclusive Nivelle offensive and one of the main commanders of the Battle of Verdun.
- Joseph Joffre, general who served as Commander-in-Chief of French forces on the Western Front from the start of World War I until the end of 1916, best known for regrouping the retreating allied armies to defeat the Germans at the strategically decisive First Battle of the Marne in September 1914.
- Lionel de Marmier, World War I and II flying ace.
- Maryse Bastié, aviator and World War I pilot.
- Hans-Joachim Marseille, successful German fighter pilot from Occitan Huguenot ancestry.
- René Prioux, French general, commander of the 1940 Battle of Hannut.
- Adolf Galland, successful German flying ace credited with 104 aerial victories during World War II, from Occitan Huguenot ancestry originating from Veynes.
- Jean-Marie Charles Abrial, French admiral, one of the commander of the Dunkirk evacuation.
- Louis Delfino, fighter ace, member of the Escadron de Chasse 2/30 Normandie-Niemen.
- Roland de La Poype, fighter ace, member of the Escadron de Chasse 2/30 Normandie-Niemen, Hero of the Soviet Union.
- Georges Bégué, engineer and agent in the Special Operations Executive during World War II.
- François Coli, pilot and navigator, best known for his attempt to achieve the first transatlantic flight, along with Charles Nungesser.

== Fashion ==
- Paul Iribe, illustrator and designer.
- Ted Lapidus, fashion designer.
- André Courrèges, fashion designer, primary remembered for its futuristic creations and his works at Balenciaga.
- Marcelle Auclair, co-founder of the fashion magazine Marie Claire.
- Christian Lacroix, fashion designer. His creations are often inspired by his native Camargue.
- Marithé + François Girbaud, fashion designers, known for their denim jeans.
- Emanuel Ungaro, fashion designer and founder of the House of Ungaro.
- Inès de la Fressange, model and aristocrat. She was named to the International Best Dressed List Hall of Fame in 1998.
- Christian Audigier, fashion designer.
- Simon Porte Jacquemus, fashion designer.
- Marine Serre, 2017 LVMH Prize for Young Fashion Designers.
- Olivier Rousteing, fashion designer and creative director of Balmain.
- Alexandre Vauthier, fashion designer.
- Jean-Charles de Castelbajac, fashion designer and street artist, descendant of an old noble family from Castelbajac, Bigorre.
- Cindy Bruna, model.
- Aymeline Valade, model.
- Sophie Theallet, fashion designer.
- Anais Mali, Victoria's Secret model.
- Isabelle Caro, model and actress.

== Cooking ==
- Auguste Escoffier, chef, restaurateur and culinary writer who popularized and updated traditional French cooking methods.
- Alain Ducasse, chef.
- Anne-Sophie Pic, chef.
- Pierre Gagnaire, chef.
- Michel Bras, chef.
