= Los de Nadau =

French Occitan band

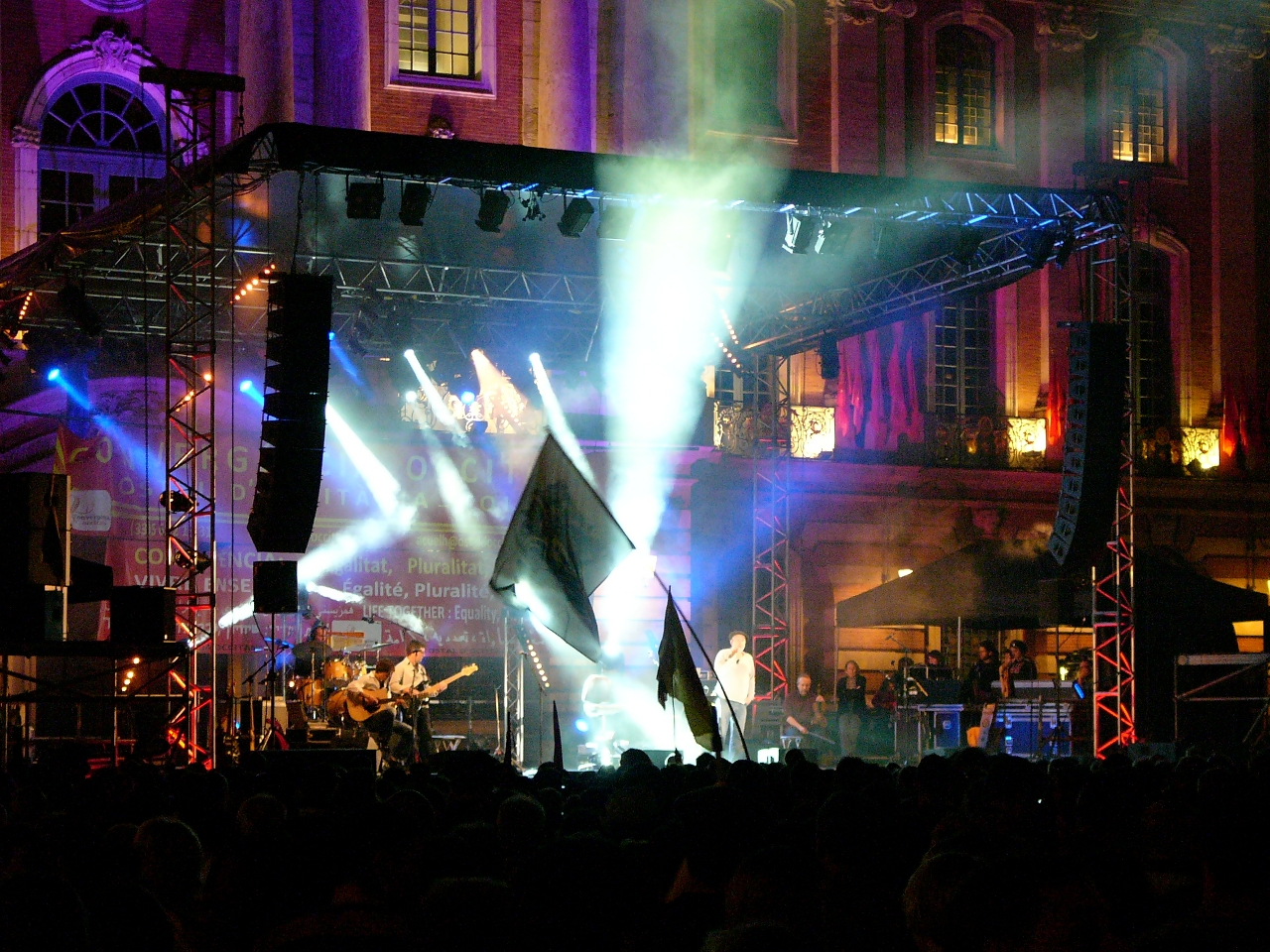
Occitan folk group Nadau performing live on Tolosa's Capitol Square after the "Anem Òc" march. March 31, 2012

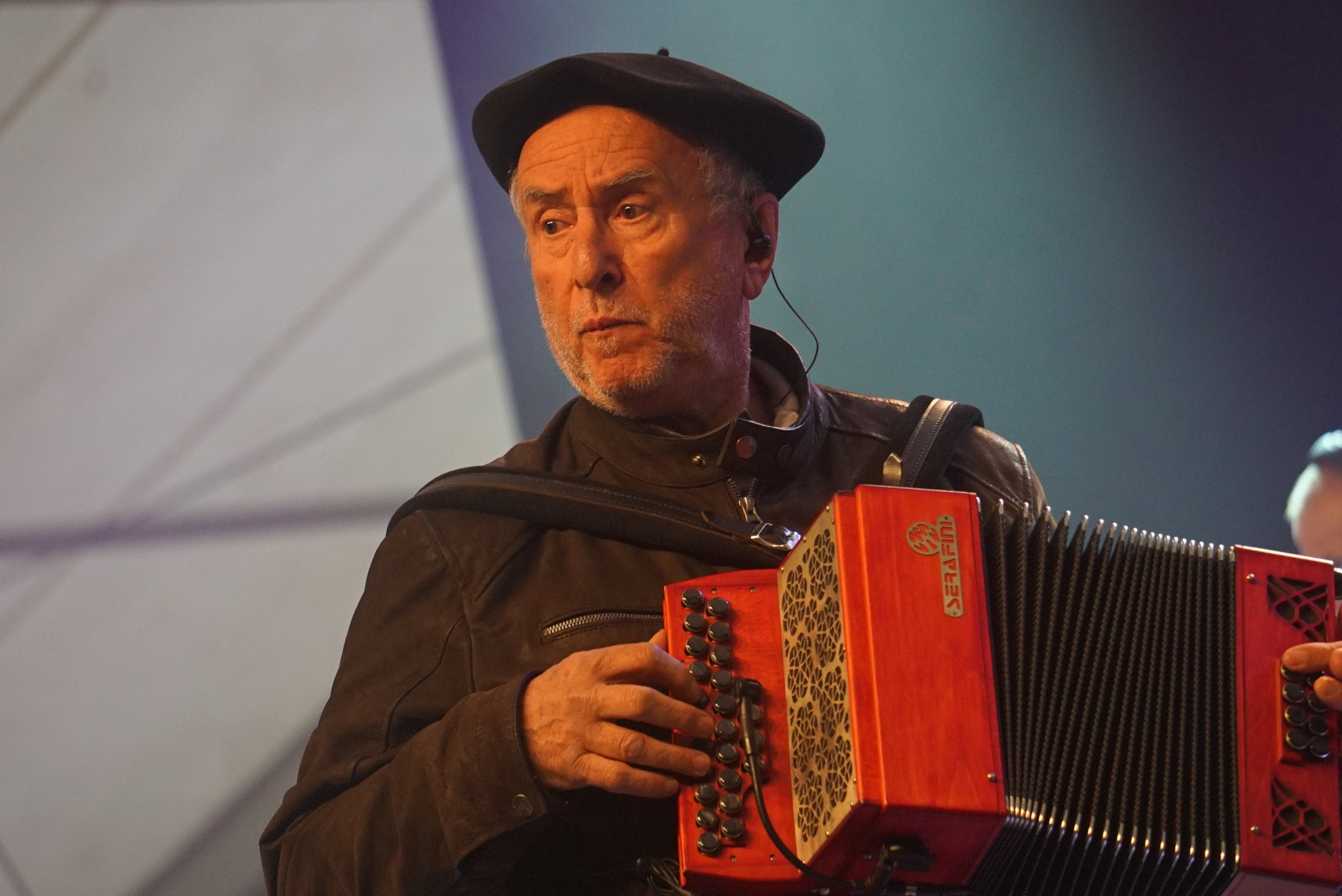
Joan de Nadau (Michel Maffrand), 2017

Founded in late 1973, Los de Nadau is a group associated with the "Nòva cançon occitana" (new Occitan song), originally a trio composed of Michel Maffrand (known as "Joan de Nadau"), Jacques Roth, and Ninon Paloumet.

The songs on their first two self-titled albums, released in 1975 and 1976, are either in a neo-traditional style or protest songs, always sung in Occitan (more precisely, in various dialectal forms of Gascon).

Los de Nadau belongs to the same movement as other Occitan singers of this post-May '68 protest period, such as Claudi Martí, Patric, and Mans de Breish. The emblematic protest songs of early Los de Nadau include "Au cap de la còrda" (At the End of the Rope), "Monsur lo regent" (Hey, Mr. Teacher), "Espanha 27 de seteme" (Spain, September 27), etc.

The group's well-known characteristic on stage is to introduce the songs they are about to perform in French, using pedagogy, poetry, or humor, in order to circumvent the problem of diglossia between French and Occitan.

Since 1991 and Jacques' departure, the group's name has been simplified to "Nadau." From the 1990s onward, the group incorporated new musicians, leading to the evolution of their music by incorporating new influences from pop, country, blues, and rock.

For Occitan audiences, Los de Nadau's best-known song, in a neo-traditional style, was for a long time "De cap tà l'immortèla" (1978). However, in the early 2000s, the group gained considerable popularity outside of Occitania, throughout France and even beyond (in northern Spain, for example), even playing in Paris (Olympia 2000, 2005, 2010, 2014), releasing two very popular songs in 2005 and 2006: "L'encantada" (The Enchanted One, 2005) and "Mon Dieu que j'en suis à mon aise" (My God, How Comfortable I Am, 2006). The latter is a cover of an old traditional French song (also known as "La Piémontaise" in France), and one of the few songs in French that they sing on stage, since they only sing in Occitan. The fact is that "Mon Dieu que j'en suis à mon aise" was originally a song from Joan de Nadau's solo album in French, a song which he incorporated on stage into those of the group.

== Band members ==
=== Current ===
- Joan de Nadau - Vocals, Diatonic accordion, Bagpipes, Harmonica
- Ninon Maffrand (Paloumet) - Vocals, Keyboard
- Sèrgi Cabos - Electric guitar, Vocals, Acoustic guitar, Mandolin, Bass, Hurdy-gurdy
- Joan-Pèir Medou - Electric guitar, Vocals, Banjo, Acoustic guitar, Mandolin, Bass, Keyboard
- Fabrice Manconi - Drums, Bass
- Cédric Privé - Violin
- Michaël Tempette - Bagpipes, Flute, Fife, Bodega

=== Former ===
- Jacques Roth
- Jacques Baudoin
- Gilbert Bastelica †

== Discography ==
=== Studio albums ===
- Los de Nadau (or "Monsur lo regent", 1975)
- Los de Nadau (or "Loteria", 1976)
- L'immortèla (1978)
- T'on vas (1982)
- Qu'èm ço qui èm (1984)
- De cuu au vent (1991)
- Pengabelòt (1994)
- Plumalhon (1998, a children's song album)
- Saumon (2003)
- Carnet de chansons (2006, solo album in French by Joan de Nadau)
- L'encantada (2013)

=== Compilation album ===
- S'avi sabut (1995)

=== Live albums ===
- Nadau en companhia (1996)
- Nadau à l'Olympia (2005)
- Olympia 2010 (2010)
- Zenith de Pau 2017 (2017)

== See also ==
- De cap tà l'immortèla
