= Marie Rouanet =

French singer (1936–2026)

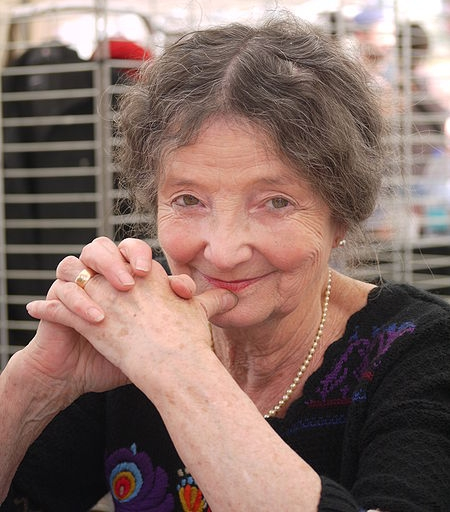
Rouanet in 2010

Marie Rouanet (Occitan: Maria Roanet, IPA: [maˈɾio̞ rwaˈnet]; 26 May 1936 – 25 January 2026) was a French Occitan singer and writer.

== Life and career ==
Rouanet was born in Béziers, Hérault in 1936. Her father was a mechanic and she studied to be a school teacher. Since she was very interested in the history and the ethnography of her region, she started to write poems and songs in Occitan and was a member of the so-called Nova Chançon (New Song) along with Patric, Joan-Pau Verdier or Rosina de Pèira. She performed her wedding with Ives Roqueta in Occitan in 1978.

She released records with the company Ventadorn and wrote several books in French.

Rouanet died on 25 January 2026, at the age of 89.

== Discography ==
- Pica Relòtge, 1973
- Cantem Nadal, 1977
- Contra corrent la Trocha Nada, 1976
- A l'Intrada del Temps clar, 1976
- Me soveni..., 1979
- Als enfants d'Occitania, 1979
- L'eternitat, 1982

== Books ==
- Occitanie 1970, les poètes de la décolonisation (PJ Oswald, Honfleur, 1971)
- Dins de patetas rojas (IEO, 1975; Letras d'òc, 2012, ISBN 978-2-916718-43-9)
- Apollonie, Reine au coeur du monde (1984)
- Je ne dois pas toucher les choses du jardin (1993)
- La Marche lente des glaciers (1994)
- Nous les filles (1990), memories
- Du côté des hommes (2001)
- Luxueuse austérité (2006)
- Mauvaises nouvelles de la chair (2008)
- Trésors d'enfance (2009)
- La Nègre (2010)
- L’Arpenteur (2012)
- Murmures pour Jean Hugo (2013)
- Abécédaire de l'Espérance (2014)
- Mon rouge Rougier (2015)
- Territoires sonores (2016)
- Émerveillements (2022)
