= Marbot family =

French noble family

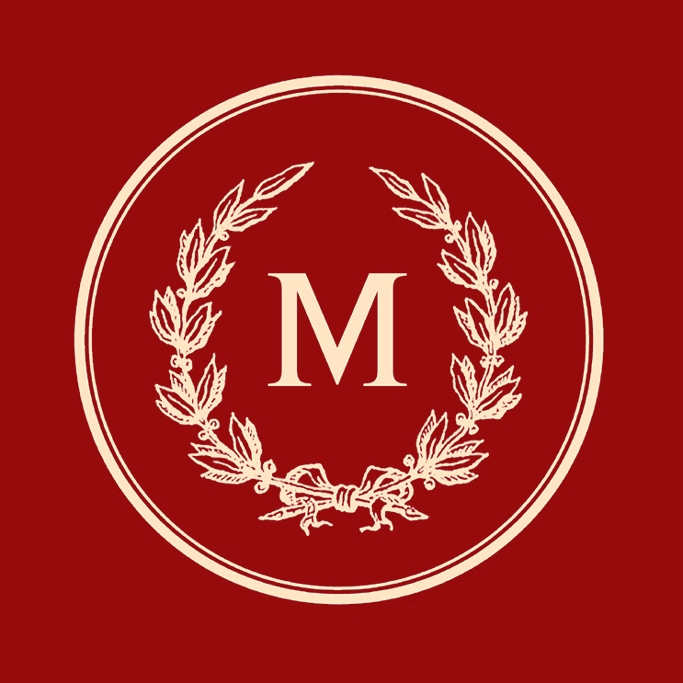
Marbot family seal

The Marbot family (English: /mɑːrˈboʊ/ mar-BOH, French: [maʁbo]) originated from the ancient province of Quercy, near what is now the Corrèze department in south-western France. It is of noble origin, although its members do not precede their names with any title.

Its name is engraved on the Arc de Triomphe in Paris (western pillar, 34th column).

== History ==
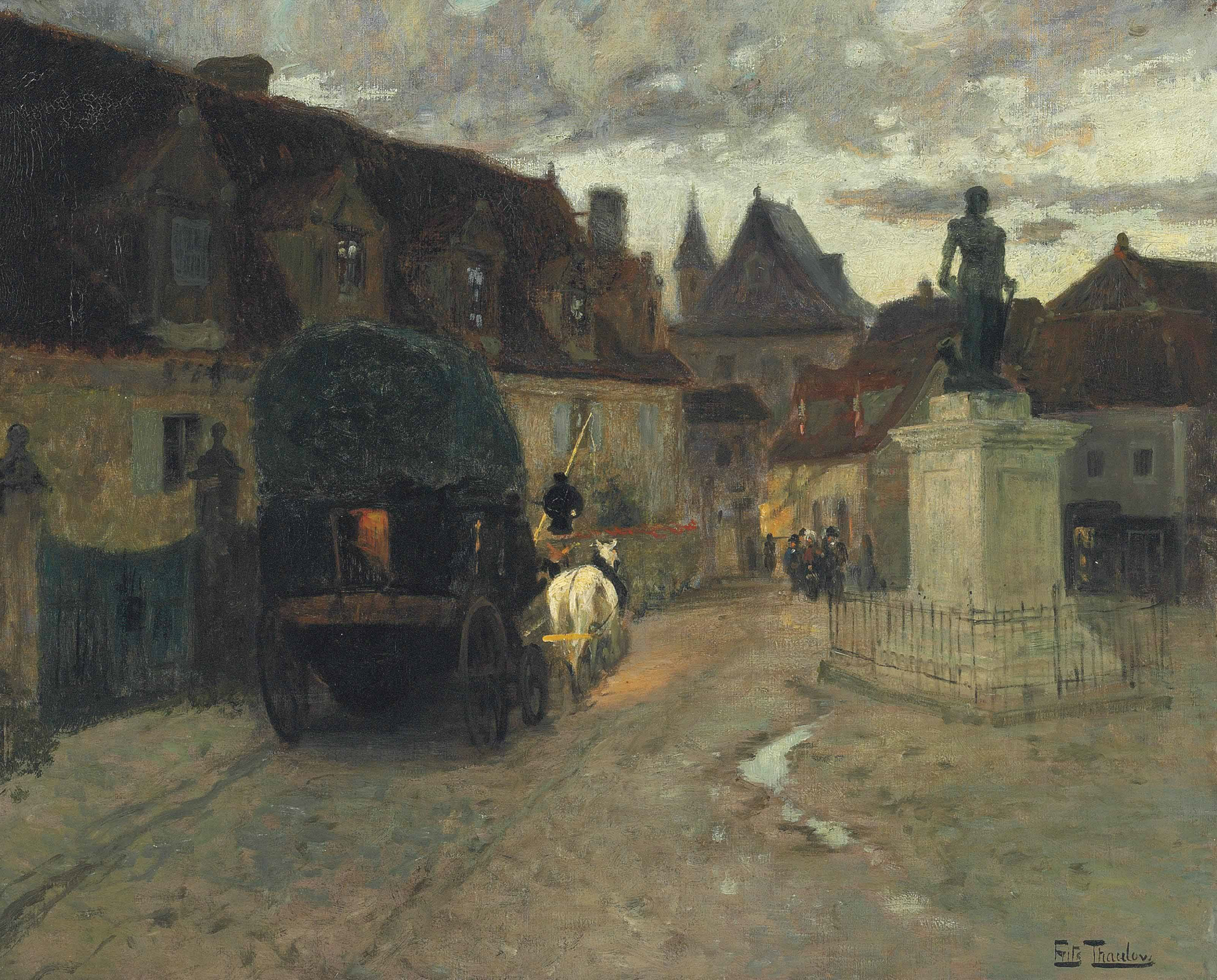
Place Marbot in Beaulieu-sur-Dordogne by Frits Thaulow

The Marbot family rose to prominence in the 17th century, becoming allied to and joining in the society of several important families of the Limousin and Quercy provinces. Its members became well established in the professions of commerce and law, which brought them considerable wealth, allowing them to acquire property and live from the income of their estates.

It has distinguished itself particularly in the career of arms, providing numerous infantry, cavalry and naval officers to the French Armed Forces, among them three generals. As from the 18th century, its members became involved with the overseas expansion of France. They were appointed to various positions in the administration of French-ruled territories, including two commissioners, an interim governor and an ordonnateur (chief administrator), until the gradual decline of the French colonial empire in the 20th century.

== Members ==
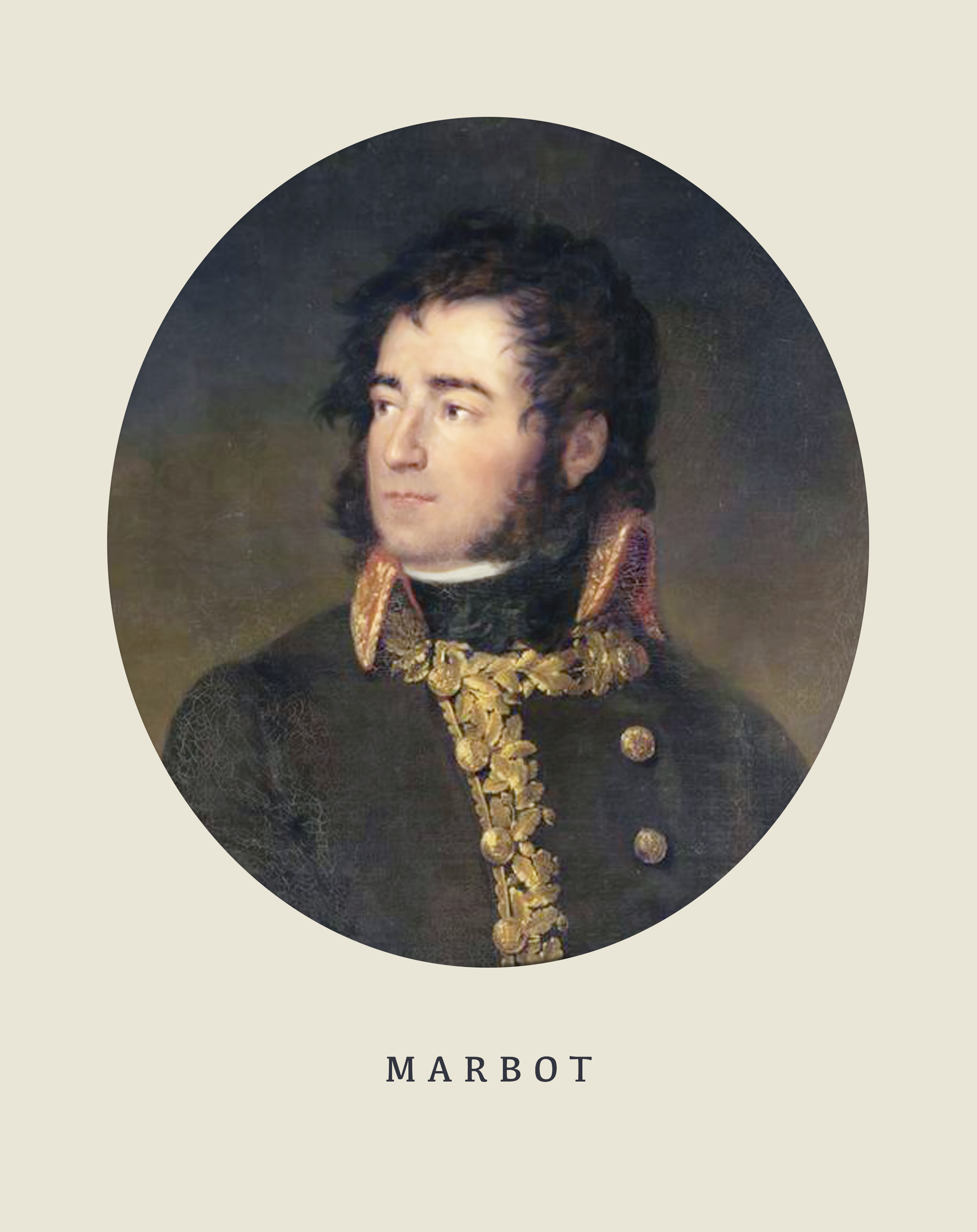
Jean-Antoine Marbot (1754–1800), French general and politician

Notable members of this family include:

- Alfred Charles Adolphe, known as Alfred Marbot (1812–1865), French painter, historian and uniformologist.
- Antoine Adolphe Marcelin, known as Adolphe Marbot (1781–1844), French maréchal de camp (brigadier general), commander of the Legion of Honour.
- Charles Rémy Paul, also known as Paul Marbot (1847–1912), commissioner in the French Navy, knight of the Legion of Honour.
- François-Achille, also known as Achille Marbot (1817–1866), ordonnateur (chief administrator) in the French Navy, interim governor of Réunion, officer of the Legion of Honour.
- Jean-Antoine, also known as Antoine Marbot (1754–1800), French divisional general and politician, name inscribed on the Arc de Triomphe.
- Jean-Baptiste Antoine Marcelin, known as Marcellin Marbot (1782–1854), French lieutenant-général (divisional general), grand officer of the Legion of Honour.
- Louis Marie Joseph, also known as Joseph Marbot (1878–1931), French engineer, developer of the Turkish and Syrian railway networks.
- Marie Rémy Joseph, known as Joseph Marbot (1862–1929), frigate captain (commander) in the French Navy, officer in the French colonial infantry, officer of the Legion of Honour.
- René Marie André, known as René Marbot (1922–2020), lieutenant in the Free French Forces, lawyer and businessperson, officer of the Legion of Honour, commander of the Ordre national du Mérite.

== See also ==
- Names inscribed on the Arc de Triomphe in Paris
- List of Occitans
- Corrèze department in France
