= We Are Beautiful =

Single by Panzer Flower and Hubert Tubbs
- Released: 7 July 2014
- Recorded: 2014
- Length: 3:42
- Label: BIP Records; Happy Music
- Songwriter(s): Hubert Tubbs; Raphaël Glatz; Patrice Duthoo; Jean-Louis Palumbo

Panzer Flower singles chronology
"We Are Beautiful" (2014)	"Magic" (2015)

Hubert Tubbs singles chronology
"It's Alright/Sunshine" (2008)	"We Are Beautiful" (2014)

Music video
- "We Are Beautiful" on YouTube

"We Are Beautiful" is a 2014 debut single by Panzer Flower, an electric/pop trio made up of Patrice Duthoo, Raphaël Glatz and Jean-Louis Palumbo. The song features vocals from Hubert Tubbs and was released by BIP Records and Happy Music.

== Track list ==
Digital BIP Records

1. "We Are Beautiful" (radio edit) (3:42)
2. "We Are Beautiful" (original extended mix) (5:48)

== Charts ==
=== Weekly charts ===
Weekly chart performance for "We Are Beautiful"
Chart (2014)	Peak position
Belgium (Ultratop 50 Flanders)	11
Belgium (Ultratop 50 Wallonia)	9
France (SNEP)	17
Israel (Media Forest)	10
Russia Airplay (TopHit)	25
Ukraine Airplay (TopHit)	33

=== Year-end charts ===
Year-end chart performance for "We Are Beautiful"
Chart (2014)	Position
France (SNEP)	132
Russia Airplay (TopHit)	106
