= De cap tà l'immortèla =

De cap tà l'immortèla ("To the Edelweiss"), or simply L'immortèla ("The Edelweiss"), is a song by Los de Nadau, an Occitan-speaking band from Béarn. It was composed in 1978 and has since grown so popular all across Occitania it is sometimes thought to be traditional folklore, just like Se Canta or Copa Santa. It is a hymn to freedom and the love for the motherland. L'immortèla, besides referring to the white flower with a yellow heart found only in the high mountains, means "the immortal one".

== Lyrics ==
Occitan original

Sèi un país e ua flor, e ua flor, e ua flor.
Que l'aperam la de l'amor, la de l'amor, la de l'amor…

Còr:
Haut, Peiròt, vam caminar, vam caminar, de cap tà l'immortèla
Haut, Peiròt, vam caminar, vam caminar, lo país vam cercar!

Au som deu malh, que i a ua lutz, que i a ua lutz, que i a ua lutz
Qu'i cau guardar los uelhs dessús, los uelhs dessús, los uelhs dessús…

Còr

Que'ns cau traucar tot lo segàs, tot lo segàs, tot lo segàs
Tà ns'arrapar, sonque las mans, sonque las mans, sonque las mans…

Còr

Lhèu veiram pas jamei la fin, jamei la fin, jamei la fin
La libertat qu'ei lo camin, qu'ei lo camin, qu'ei lo camin…

Còr

Après lo malh, un aute malh, un aute malh, un aute malh
Après la lutz, ua auta lutz, ua auta lutz, ua auta lutz…

Còr

English translation

I know a place and a flower, and a flower, and a flower.
They call the flower of love, the flower of love…

Chorus:
Up we'll walk, Li'l Peter, to the edelweiss.
Up we'll walk, Li'l Peter, until we find that place!

On top of that peak, there's a light, there's a light, there's a light
You must keep an eye on, an eye on, an eye on…

Chorus

We'll have to cross the brambles, cross the brambles, cross the brambles
And hang only by our hands, by our hands, by our hands…

Chorus

We may never see the end of it, the end of it, the end of it.
Freedom's the only path, the only path, the only path…

Chorus

After that peak, yet another peak, another peak, another peak,
After that light, yet another light, another light, another light…

Chorus
