= Les Ablettes =

French punk rock band

Les Ablettes was a 20th-century French punk-rock band from Fumel (Lot-et-Garonne, Nouvelle-Aquitaine). They charted in 1987 in France when the single "Jackie s'en fout" reached No. 46.
