= Panzer Flower =

- Origin: Montpellier, Occitanie, France
- Genres: Electronic, electro funk
- Years active: 2003–present
- Labels: Def Jam Island
- Members: Patrice Duthoo; Raphaël Glatz

Panzer Flower are a French electronic project from Occitanie, consisting of Patrice Duthoo and Raphaël Glatz. It was named "Meilleur Espoir Français" (Best French Hopefuls) by the French music magazine Rock & Folk. The duo's best known hit is the 2014 single "We Are Beautiful" produced by jean louis Palumbo and features vocals of Hubert Tubbs.

== Discography ==
=== Singles ===
Year	Title	Peak chart positions			Certifications	Album
Year	Title	FRA	BEL (Vl)	BEL (Wa)	Certifications	Album
2014	"We Are Beautiful" (featuring Hubert Tubbs)	2	3	1		Non-album single
2015	"Magic" (feat Mike Louvila)	33	–	–		Non-album single
2023	"I Wish" (feat. Michael and MUSYCA)					Non-album single
"—" denotes a single that did not chart or was not released in that territory.
