= Marguerite Genès =

French writer and teacher (1868–1955)

- Born: 26 January 1868; Marseille, France
- Died: 18 March 1955 (aged 87); Brive-la-Gaillarde (Corrèze)
- Citizenship: French
- Occupations: Writer, teacher, nurse
- Parent: Louise Delort de La Flotte
- Family: Corrèze family

Marguerite Genès (1868–1955) was a French woman of letters and teacher who wrote in Occitan and French. A poet, storyteller, and folklorist, she was named Queen of the Félibrige celebration, which was held to defend and promote the literature and customs of the Occitan language (locally called the langue d'Oc).

== Biography ==
Margareta (as spelled in the Occitan language) was born in Marseille, France, on 26 January 1868. She was the daughter of Louise Delort de La Flotte, from the Corrèze family, and of a certain Henri Genès, who remained unknown to her. Her childhood home was in Brive, France, the birthplace of her maternal family, where she spoke the Occitan language. She went to Paris for her higher education and then returned to live in Brive, where she taught the French language at a private institution and lived out her life.

As a teacher, she led a modest life, dividing her time between her students, her many literary works, and her publications of Limousin folklore in the pages of the regionalist and Félibrige magazine Lemouzi (Tulle, November 1893), in particular, or in L'Echo de la Corrèze (Paris, 1892), the monthly magazine of "La Ruche corrézienne" (1892) of the Limousins of Paris.

Genès was named Queen of the Félibrige celebration in Limousin in 1894 and took a student Margareta Priolo who would become Queen from 1913 to 1920. Throughout her reign, the queen was hailed as the face of the festivities and received a silver olive branch as her insignia.

During World War I, Genès became a volunteer nurse and kept a regular notebook diary throughout the 1914–1918 war. Her manuscripts are still preserved in the municipal archives of Brive-la-Gaillarde and have been published electronically as part of the Centennial of the First World War. They remain an important testimony about the town of Brive during the War.

A playwright, she organized the theatre society of the School of Bertran de Born. According to sources, "Only two of her plays were published as monographs: Les Francimands, a comedy in two acts (by Marguerite Genès and Eusèbe Bombal. Brive, impr. catholique, 48p.) in 1924, and Les Lois d'Amour, a one-act verse (by Marguerite Genès and Mathylde Peyre. Brive, impr. de Chartrusse, Praudel et Cie, 32p. and music) in 1944."

She died in Brive on 18 March 1955.

== Legacy ==
A folklorist and disciple of Marguerite Genès, Geneviève Brizard, deposited her archival papers at the Departmental Archives of Corrèze on 19 August and 19 October 1954.
