= Joan Pau Verdier =

French singer (1947–2020)

Joan Pau Verdier (born Jean-Paul Verdier; 1 February 1947 – 21 June 2020) was a French singer born in Périgueux, Dordogne, who performed in both Occitan and French. He was one of the main figures of the Nòva cançon, an Occitan musical renewal wave during the 1970s.

Verdier died on 21 June 2020.

== Discography ==
- 1973 – Occitània sempre (LP)
- 1974 – L'exil (LP)
- 1974 – Veiqui l'occitan (single)
- 1974 – Dança liura (single)
- 1975 – Faits divers (LP)
- 1976 – Vivre (LP)
- 1977 – Tabou-le-chat (LP)
- 1978 – Le nuage dans la tête (LP)
- 1979 – Apollinaire Street (single)
- 1979 – Le chantepleure (LP)
- 1981 – Ballade d'Adrien – OST of Pierre Denis' "Histoire d'Adrien" (single)
- 1981 – Vieillir auprès de toi (single)
- 1982 – Machita (single)
- 1983 – Plus rien à perdre (single)
- 1986 – Chante Croze – Chante souvenir (EP)
- 1987 – 5e saison (LP)
- 1990 – Bigaroc – Le chant du sud (LP)
- 1992 – Pirouettes (LP)
- 1993 – Les grandes chansons (2LP)
- 2001 – Léo, domani (CD)
- 2002 – Verdier Bonnefon Salinié chantent Brassens (CD)
- 2006 – Verdier Bonnefon Salinié chantent Brassens, volume 2 (CD)
- 2007 – Joan Pau Verdier/ Léo Ferré, Avec le temps / Coma lo temps (audiobook)
