= Margareta Priolo =

French folklorist (1890–1955)

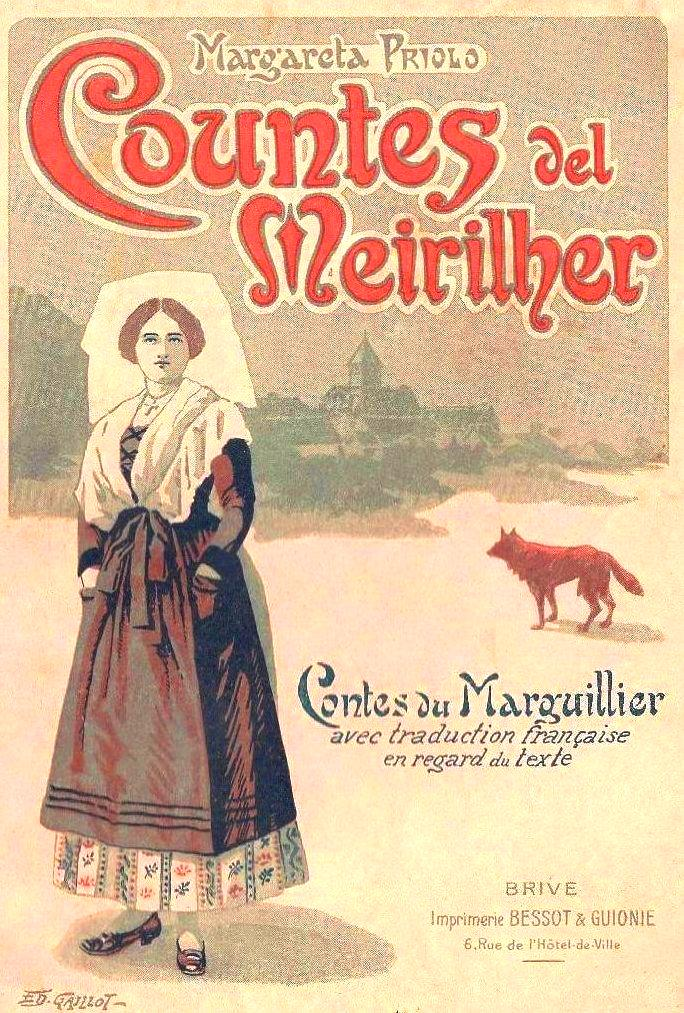
Margareta Priolo pictured on the cover of her book wearing the Limousin folk costume. (1916)

Margareta Priolo (14 March 1890 – 13 March 1955) (sometimes spelled Marguerite or Margarida) was an Occitan folklorist and teacher from the Limousin region in southern France. As a young woman, she was named Queen of the Félibrige celebration in 1913, which was held to defend and promote the literature and customs of the Occitan language (locally called the langue d'Oc).

== Biography ==
Priolo was born in Brive, France, in 1890 into a well-off family. Her father, Dr. Priolo, was president of the Society of Geography and belonged to the school of the troubadour Bertran de Born. Previously, her mother had served as Queen of the Félibrige in Limousin for about fifteen years.

Margareta was a disciple of poet Josèp Ros and a student of another queen of the Félibrige, Marguerite Genès. Priolo was named Queen of the Félibrige held in Aix-en-Provence in 1913, a title she retained until 1920. In that role, she was "the face of the Félibrige, and received as her insignia a silver olive branch. In this capacity, she participated in the various festivals and commemorations of the movement, frequently alongside the capoulié, and also presided over the court of love, a spectacle inherited from the troubadours, where dances, songs, and poetry are mixed."

Events of the Félibrige were reported in publications throughout the Occitan and wider region in southern France. In illustrations, the Queen was depicted wearing the traditional Limousin headdress known as the goatee.

=== Personal life ===
Priolo worked as a nurse at the Red Cross hospital in Brive during World War I. In 1918, she married a painter and engraver from the area, Edouard Guillaume Gaillot.

Until Priolo died on 13 March 1955 in Manzac-sur-Vern in Dordogne, she remained active with the Limousin Félibrige and continued to participate locally in disseminating the Occitan language.

=== Selected works ===
Priolo participated in the collection of recordings by Ferdinand Brunot of the Sorbonne University as part of the project "Archives of the Parole" in August 1913 when she was 23 years old. Two of her recordings still survive titled Mons soucs par Léon Branchet. They are currently online on Gallica.

Her stories were inspired by the oral heritage of her region and written in the language of the lower Limousin. Legendas Lemonzinas (1915) and Countes del Meirilher (1916) earned Priolo positive reviews from the 1927 Occitan Almanac saying "two volumes of prose, brilliant result of a fruitful intellectual work, as a perfect mirror of a rare feminine temperament."
