= Kazero =

French pop duo

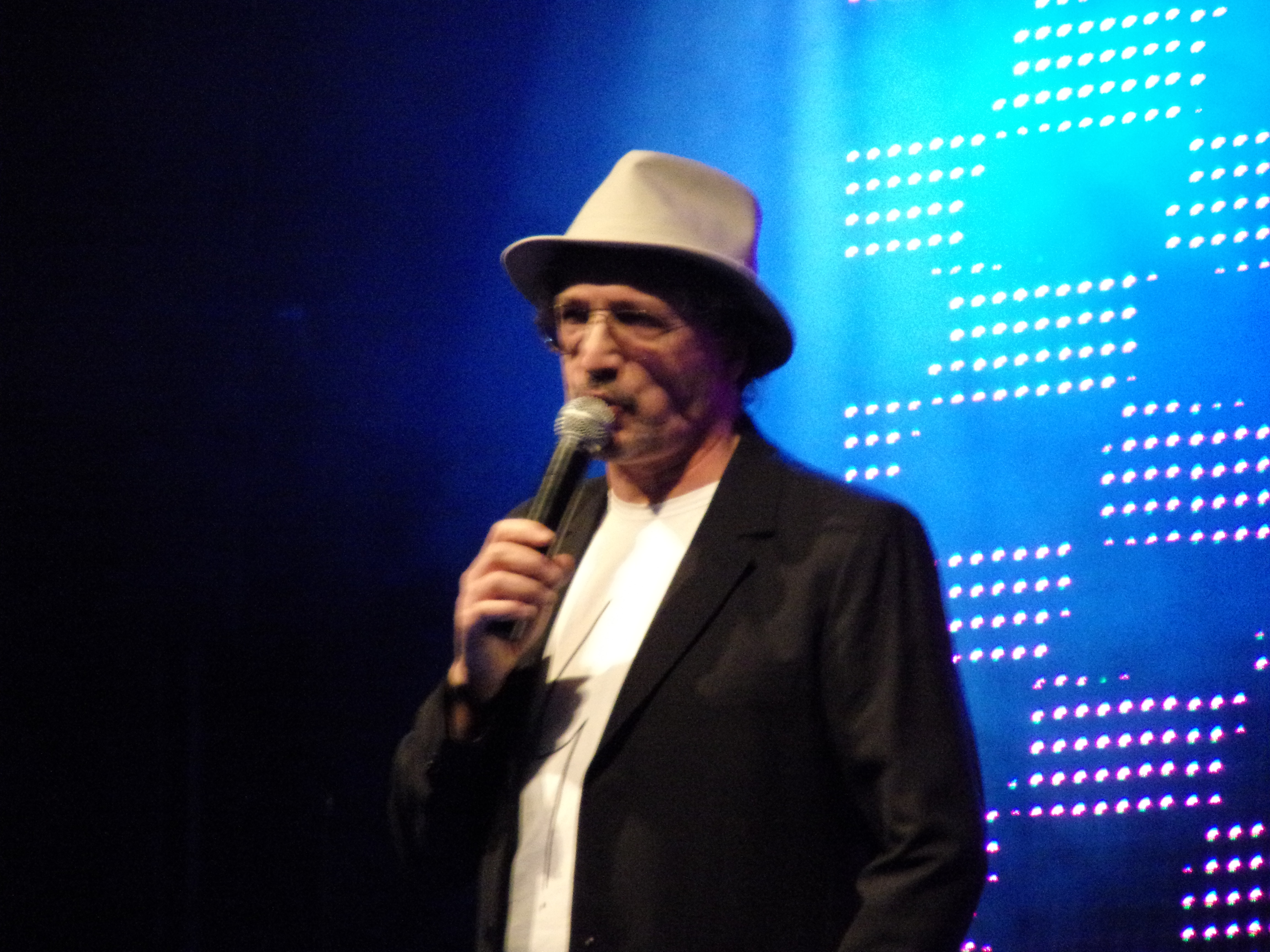
- Éric Casero at the "Étoiles des années 80" concert in Sorgues on 17 February 2016.

Background information
- Origin: Toulouse, France
- Genres: Synth-pop; chanson
- Years active: 1978–1987
- Members: Éric Casero; Véronique Segaud

Kazero were a French pop duo (Éric Casero and Véronique Segaud) from Toulouse (Occitania) who were active from 1978 to 1987.

== Discography ==
- 1986 Thaï nana
- 1987 Whoopy Machine
