= Mans de Breish =

French Occitan singer (born 1949)

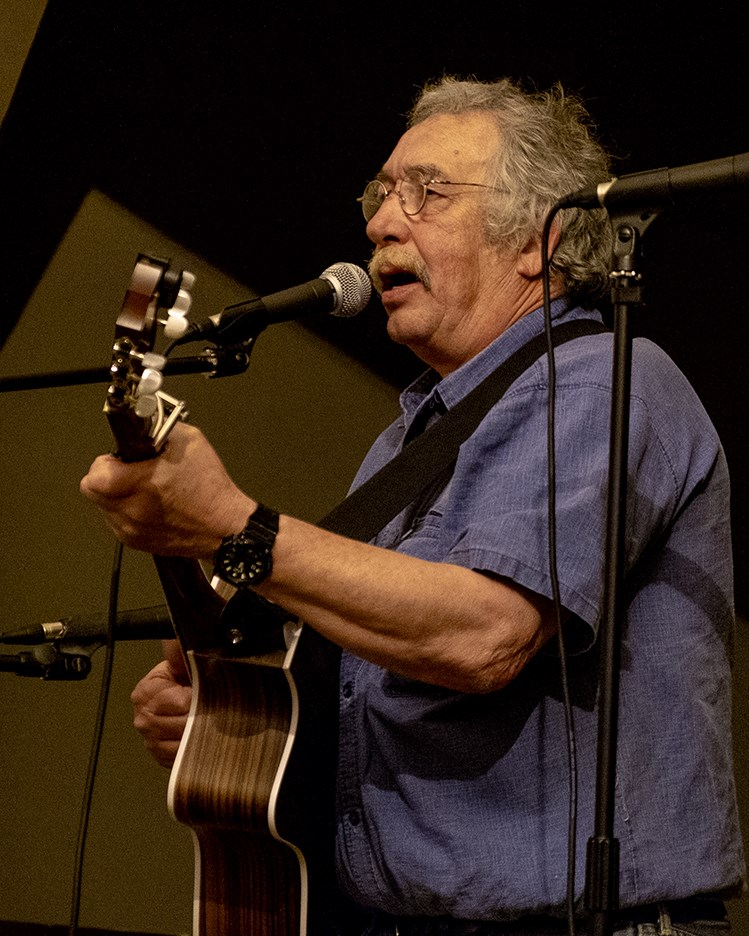
Mans de Breish 2018

Mans de Breish (born as Gérard Pourhomme on January 29, 1949) is a French Occitan language singer from Carcassonne in Occitanie (southern France). He was one of the main figures of Nòva cançon in the 1970s.

== Discography ==
- Volèm viure al país (Ventadorn, 1975)
- Autonomia (Ventadorn, 1977)
- Flor de luna (2000)
- Alba d'Occitània (2006)
- La guèrra bartassièra (2011)
- Ont se'n va (2017)
