= Patric (singer) =

- Birth name: Patrick Martin
- Born: 1947 (age 77–78); Hérault, France

Patric (born Patrick Martin in 1947) is an Occitan singer. He is one of the main figures of Nòva cançon, a music phenomenon promoting Occitanism. He's notable for several songs, for example his 2010 cover of the song "Bella ciao" in Occitan language.

== Biography ==
At the end of the 1960s, Patric was a student in Montpellier, a pupil of Robert Lafont. Patric became one of the first to sing in Occitan, spearheading the Nòva cançon movement. He takes his first name as his stage name, since he often was confused with another Occitan singer Claudi Martí. His first lyrics address the themes of the Occitan claim—problems of Languedoc viticulture, youth discomfort, refusal of uprooting, and internal colonialism.

Patric writes his own songs in both Occitan and French, as well as covering songs in Occitan by other singers such as Lluís Llach and Bob Dylan. In 2012, he recorded a CD of his songs translated into Esperanto. Most of his albums are published on his own record label Aurora production, founded in 1990.

In 2020, he published his autobiography and on the movement of the "Nòva cançon", written in the Occitan language.
