= Nòva cançon =

1970s music genre of Occitania

Nòva cançon (Occitan pronunciation: [ˈnɔβɔ kanˈsu, -ɔvɔ], also spelled Nòva chançon [ˈnɔvɔ tʃanˈsu], "New Song") is a musical renewal wave that swept through Occitania in the 1970s, and continues to the present. Its leaders are Joan Pau Verdier, Claudi Martí, Patric, Maria Roanet and Mans de Breish, most of whom are still very active singers. Nòva cançon is a phenomenon similar to Catalonia's Nova cançó. Nòva cançon is loosely defined as a song that is promoting Occitanism and the general culture. It doesn't have a specific genre, but is usually folk or pop music.
