= Claudi Martí =

French singer

Claudi Martí (born 6 March 1940 in Carcassonne, Aude) is an Occitan singer from the Carcassonne region in Occitania. He was one of the main figures of Nòva cançon in the 1970s.

== Discography ==
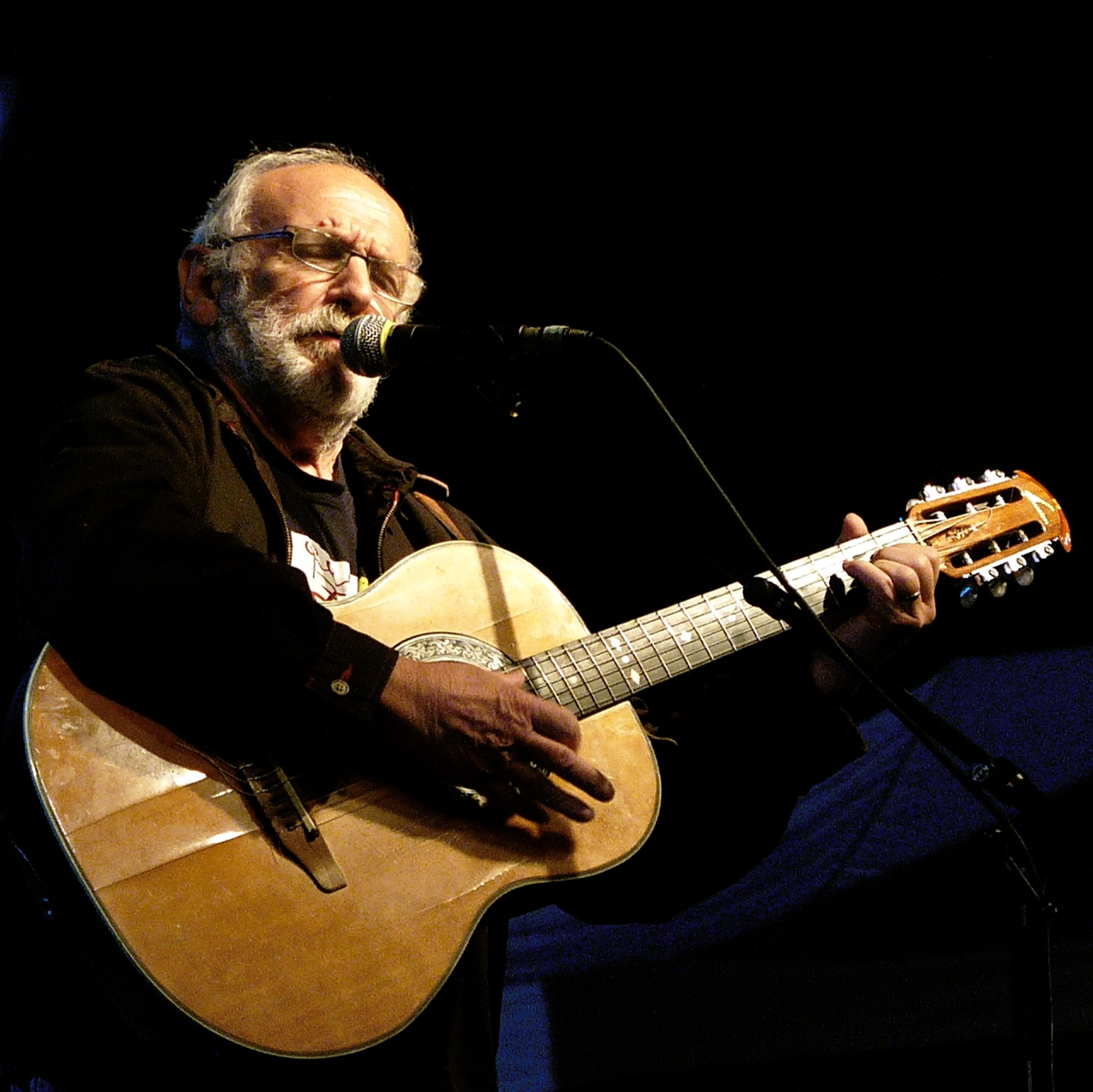
Claudi Martí

- Occitània! (1969)
- Lengadòc roge (1971)
- Montsegur! (1972)
- Marti (1972)
- Lo país que vòl viure (1973)
- L'òme esper (1974)
- L'an 01 (1975)
- Lo camin del solelh (1976)
- Monta vida (1980)
- Et pourtant elle tourne... (1992)
- El jinete (2002)
- Ço Milhor (2006)
- Tolosa (2008)

== Bibliography ==
- Homme d'Oc (1974)
- Claude Marti (1974)
- Caminarem (1978)
- Les petites Espagnes (1984)
- Ombres et lumière (1998)
- Carcassone (1998)
- Corbières au cœur (1998)
- Trencavel (1999)
- Carcassonne au cœur (1999)
- Minervois au cœur (2002)
- L'Olivier ou la résurrection de l'éternel (2003)
