= The Very Best of Tower of Power: The Warner Years =

Compilation album by Tower of Power
- Released: July 17, 2001
- Recorded: May 1972 – September 15, 1975
- Genre: R&B
- Length: 64:30
- Label: Rhino/Warner Brothers

Tower of Power chronology
What Is Hip? The Tower of Power Anthology (1999)	The Very Best of Tower of Power: The Warner Years (2001)	Soul With a Capital "S" – The Best of Tower of Power (2002)

Professional ratings
Review scores
Source	Rating
AllMusic	4.5/5 stars

The Very Best of Tower of Power: The Warner Years is a compilation album of material recorded by the band Tower of Power from May 1972 to September 1975. Stephen Thomas Erlewine of AllMusic writes in his review that "for listeners that want a lean dose of the TOP's prime, this is the best collection on the market."

== Track listing ==
All tracks are written by Emilio Castillo and Stephen Kupka, unless otherwise noted.

No.	Title	Writer(s)	Original album	Length
1.	"You Got to Funkifize"		Bump City (1972)	4:31
2.	"What Happened to the World that Day?"		Bump City	4:11
3.	"Down to the Nightclub"	Emilio Castillo; Stephen Kupka; David Garibaldi	Bump City	2:43
4.	"You're Still a Young Man"		Bump City	5:34
5.	"What Is Hip?"	Emilio Castillo; Stephen Kupka; David Garibaldi	Tower of Power (1973)	5:04
6.	"So Very Hard to Go"		Tower of Power	3:39
7.	"This Time It's Real"	Emilio Castillo; Stephen Kupka; David Bartlett	Tower of Power	2:50
8.	"Will I Ever Find a Love?"		Tower of Power	3:48
9.	"Soul Vaccination"		Tower of Power	5:10
10.	"Time Will Tell"		Back to Oakland (1974)	3:06
11.	"Below Us, All the City Lights"		Back to Oakland	4:14
12.	"Don't Change Horses (in the Middle of a Stream)"	Lenny Williams; Johnny Watson	Back to Oakland	4:42
13.	"Willing to Learn"		Urban Renewal (1975)	4:35
14.	"Only So Much Oil in the Ground"		Urban Renewal	3:45
15.	"I Won't Leave Unless You Want Me To"	Emilio Castillo; Stephen Kupka; Greg Adams	Urban Renewal	3:28
16.	"You're So Wonderful, So Marvelous"	Emilio Castillo; Stephen Kupka; Frank Biner	In the Slot (1975)	3:10
Total length:				64:30

All track information and credits were taken from the CD liner notes.
