= Cold Blood =

Cold blood may refer to:

- sang froid, ruthlessness, see Conscience
- a classification for draft or pack horses, see horse breed
- Coldblood, a Marvel Comics villain
- "Cold Blood" (Doctor Who), an episode of the British TV series Doctor Who
- Cold Blood (TV series), a UK crime drama series

== Music ==
- Cold Blood (band), an American rock/jazz/soul band formed in 1968
  - Cold Blood (album), their debut album
- "Cold Blood" (Yo Gotti song), a song by rapper Yo Gotti featuring J. Cole
- "Cold Blood", song by Geraldine Hunt 1972
- "Cold Blood", song by Kix from Blow My Fuse 1988
- "Cold Blood", song by Peter Tosh from Wanted Dread & Alive 1981

== See also ==
- Cold-blooded (disambiguation)
- In Cold Blood (disambiguation)
