= Torjesen =

Torjesen is a Norwegian surname and may refer to:

- Eric Torjesen, lead guitarist for the band Starship from 1996–2000
- Ole Torjesen Lindstøl (1820–1905), Norwegian politician
- Peter Torjesen (1892–1939), Norwegian missionary to China
- Siri Torjesen (b.1958), Norwegian soprano
- Stina Torjesen, Norwegian academic
