= Flikke =

Flikke is a Norwegian surname. Notable people with the surname include:

- Geir Flikke (born 1963), Norwegian political scientist
- Gunnar Flikke (born 1947), Norwegian newspaper editor
- Julia O. Flikke (1879–1965), American nurse
