= Bump City =

Studio album by Tower of Power
- Released: May 1972
- Recorded: 1971–1972
- Studios: Trans Maximus Inc., Memphis, Tennessee
- Genres: Soul, funk
- Length: 35:52
- Label: Warner Bros.
- Producers: Ron Capone, Tower of Power

Tower of Power chronology
East Bay Grease (1970)	Bump City (1972)	Tower of Power (1973)

Bump City is the second album by the soul/funk group Tower of Power. The album cover is derived from a sketch by David Garibaldi. It is also their first album for Warner Bros. Records. With Rufus Miller now gone, Rick Stevens took the reins as the sole lead vocalist for this album.

Professional ratings
Review scores
Source	Rating
AllMusic	3/5 stars
Christgau's Record Guide	C

== Track listing ==
All songs written by Emilio Castillo and Stephen "Doc" Kupka unless otherwise noted.

1. "You Got to Funkifize" - 4:31
2. "What Happened to the World That Day?" - 4:11
3. "Flash in the Pan" - 3:34
4. "Gone (in Memory of Jacqueline Mesquite)" (Greg Adams, Skip Mesquite) - 3:41
5. "You Strike My Main Nerve" (Kupka, Castillo, L. Williams, L. Gordon) - 2:52
6. "Down to the Nightclub" (Kupka, Castillo, David Garibaldi) - 2:43
7. "You're Still a Young Man" - 5:35
8. "Skating on Thin Ice" - 3:48
9. "Of the Earth" - 4:30

== Personnel ==
- Rick Stevens - lead vocals
- Skip Mesquite - first tenor saxophone, flute, vocals (lead on "Gone")
- Emilio Castillo - second tenor saxophone, vocals
- Greg Adams - trumpet, flugelhorn (solo on "Gone"), French horn, piano (on "Gone"), vocals
- Stephen "Doc" Kupka - baritone saxophone, vocals
- Mic Gillette - trumpet, trombone, French horn, vocals
- Willie James Fulton - guitar, vocals
- David Garibaldi - drums
- Francis Rocco Prestia - bass
- Brent Byars - conga drums, vocals
- Jay Spell - piano (on "What Happened to the World That Day", "You're Still a Young Man" and "Of the Earth")
- Memphis Strings - arranged and conducted by Greg Adams on "What Happened to the World That Day?", "You're Still a Young Man" and "Of the Earth"

Technical

- Ron Capone, Steve Cropper - mixing

== Charts ==
Album

Chart performance for Bump City
Chart (1972)	Peak position
US Billboard 200	85
US Top R&B/Hip-Hop Albums (Billboard)	16

Singles - Billboard (United States)

Year	Single	Chart	Position
1972	"You're Still a Young Man"	The Billboard Hot 100	29
1972	"You're Still a Young Man"	R&B Singles	24
1972	"Down to the Nightclub"	The Billboard Hot 100	66
