= East Bay Grease =

Studio album by Tower of Power
- Released: 1970
- Studios: Mercury, San Francisco
- Genres: Soul, R&B
- Length: 41:35
- Label: San Francisco/Atlantic
- Producer: David Rubinson

Tower of Power chronology
East Bay Grease (1970)	Bump City (1972)

Singles from East Bay Grease
- 1. "Back on the Streets Again/Sparkling in the Sand" Released: 1970

East Bay Grease is the debut album by the soul and funk group Tower of Power, released in 1970. The band was one of the early music groups to be signed by Bill Graham's Fillmore Records, which released the LP.

The album shows the band at an early stage of development, trying out several lead singers including Rick Stevens who soon left the band (1972) because of heavy drug abuse. In a retrospective review, music historian Rickey Vincent said the album contained "sloppy and raggedy horn-heavy R&B." Drummer David Garibaldi later said that his playing style was undisciplined during this time, that the album showed his "rough edges". He began private drum lessons with a Bay Area drum teacher named Chuck Brown, and polished his technique in time for the improvements to be heard on 1973's Tower of Power album.

The album was released on CD in 1992 by Rhino Records.

Professional ratings
Review scores
Source	Rating
AllMusic	3/5 stars

== Track listing ==
All selections written by Emilio Castillo and Stephen Kupka, except "Sparkling in the Sand" by Emilio Castillo, Stephen Kupka and Lawrence Lopez.

1. "Knock Yourself Out" - 7:08
2. "Social Lubrication" - 7:28
3. "The Price" - 6:09
4. "Back on the Streets Again" - 5:50
5. "The Skunk, the Goose, and the Fly" - 5:55
6. "Sparkling in the Sand" - 9:06

== Personnel ==
Production credit

- Rufus Miller - lead vocals (except "Sparkling in the Sand")
- Emilio Castillo - alto saxophone, vocals, extra greasy vocal on "The Skunk, the Goose, and the Fly"
- David Garibaldi - drums, vibes, background vocals
- Greg Adams - first trumpet
- Stephen "The Funky Doctor" Kupka - baritone saxophone, background vocals
- Skip Mesquite - tenor saxophone, flute, vocals
- David Padron - second trumpet
- Frank Rocco Prestia - bass
- Rick Stevens - lead vocal on "Sparkling in the Sand"; background vocals
- Willie James Fulton - guitar, background vocals
- Mic Gillette - trumpet, trombone, flugelhorn with solo on "Sparkling in the Sand"
- Ken Balzell - trumpet

Technical

- Bruce Steinberg - cover and liner design, artwork, photography
