= Back to Oakland =

Studio album by Tower of Power
- Released: February 1974
- Recorded: 1974
- Studios: Record Plant, Sausalito, California; Kaye/Smith, Seattle, Washington
- Genres: Soul, funk
- Length: 43:05
- Label: Warner Bros.
- Producer: Tower of Power

Tower of Power chronology
Tower of Power (1973)	Back to Oakland (1974)	Urban Renewal (1975)

Professional ratings
Review scores
Source	Rating
AllMusic	4.5/5 stars
Christgau's Record Guide	C+

Back to Oakland is the fourth album by Bay Area based band Tower of Power, released in early 1974 on Warner Bros. Records. It was voted by Modern Drummer magazine as one of the most important recordings for drummers to listen to. The cover photography was by Bruce Steinberg at San Francisco–Oakland Bay Bridge, San Francisco, California.

== Track listing ==
1. "Oakland Stroke..." (Emilio Castillo, David Garibaldi, Stephen Kupka) - 0:53
2. "Don't Change Horses (In the Middle of a Stream)" (Johnny "Guitar" Watson, Lenny Williams) - 4:28
3. "Just When We Start Makin' It" (Castillo, Kupka, Lenny Williams) - 6:30
4. "Can't You See (You Doin' Me Wrong)" (Castillo, Kupka, Williams) - 3:00
5. "Squib Cakes" (Chester Thompson) - 7:49
6. "Time Will Tell" (Castillo, Kupka) - 3:11
7. "Man from the Past" (Castillo, Kupka, Williams) - 4:00
8. "Love's Been Gone So Long" (Bruce Conte) - 4:47
9. "I Got the Chop" (Castillo, Kupka) - 2:59
10. "Below Us, All the City Lights" (Castillo, Kupka) - 4:20
11. "...Oakland Stroke" (Castillo, Garibaldi, Kupka) - 1:08

== Personnel ==
Tower of Power

- Lenny Williams – lead vocals
- Chester Thompson – acoustic piano, Fender Rhodes, clavinet, organ, bass pedals, backing vocals; arrangements (5)
- Bruce Conte – guitars, backing vocals
- Francis Rocco Prestia – bass guitar
- David Garibaldi – drums
- Brent Byars – congas
- Lenny Pickett – alto saxophone, bass saxophone, soprano saxophone, first tenor saxophone, flute, alto flute, piccolo
- Stephen "Doc" Kupka – baritone saxophone, English horn, backing vocals
- Emilio Castillo – second tenor saxophone, backing vocals
- Mic Gillette – trombone, bass trombone, trumpet, flugelhorn, backing vocals
- Greg Adams – trumpet, flugelhorn, orchestra bells, backing vocals; string arrangements, string conductor (1−9, 11), arrangements (3, 4, 6, 8, 10)
- Tower of Power – arrangements (2, 4, 7, 9)

Additional musicians

- Bud Shank – alto saxophone (10), flute (10), alto flute (10), piccolo (10)
- Ray Gillette – trombone (6)
- Kell Houston – trombone (6)
- Frank Rosolino – trombone (10)
- Tommy Shepard – trombone (10)
- David Duke – French horn (10)
- Vincent DeRosa – French horn (10)
- Richard Perissi – French horn (10)
- Harry Betts – string conductor (10)
- Marylin Scott – backing vocals (2, 3, 4, 6, 8)
- Pepper Watkins – backing vocals (2, 3, 4)
- Alice Thompson – backing vocals (6)

Production

- Tower of Power – producers
- Emilio Castillo – supervising producer
- Alan Chinowsky – sound production, mixing
- Tom Flye – recording
- Jim Gaines – recording, mixing
- Bruce Steinberg – album design, photography

== Charts ==
Chart (1974)	Peak position
Billboard Top LPs	26
Billboard Top Soul LPs	13

=== Singles ===
Year	Single	Chart positions		
Year	Single	US	US R&B	US Dance
1974	"Don't Change Horses (In the Middle of a Stream)"	26	22	—
1974	"Time Will Tell"	—	69	27
