= Urban Renewal (Tower of Power album) =

Studio album by Tower of Power
- Released: January 1975
- Recorded: 1974
- Studios: Record Plant, Sausalito, California
- Genres: Funk, soul
- Length: 37:46
- Label: Warner Bros.
- Producers: Emilio Castillo, Tower of Power

Tower of Power chronology
Back to Oakland (1974)	Urban Renewal (1975)	In the Slot (1975)

Professional ratings
Review scores
Source	Rating
AllMusic	link
Christgau's Record Guide	B+

Urban Renewal is a Tower of Power album recorded in 1974 and released in 1975. It was the last to feature lead singer Lenny Williams, who would leave to continue a successful solo career. Drummer David Garibaldi left the band temporarily, although he does appear on the song "Willing To Learn," the first single. David Bartlett is the drummer for the rest of the album. Conga player Carter Collins replaced Brent Byars, who left after the previous album, Back to Oakland.

== Track listing ==
1. "Only So Much Oil in the Ground" (Stephen "Doc" Kupka, Emilio Castillo) - 3:46
2. "Come Back, Baby" (Bruce Conte, Lenny Williams) - 3:21
3. "It's Not the Crime" (Stephen "Doc" Kupka, Emilio Castillo) - 1:45
4. "I Won't Leave Unless You Want Me To" (Stephen "Doc" Kupka, Emilio Castillo, Greg Adams) - 3:28
5. "Maybe It'll Rub Off" (Stephen "Doc" Kupka, Emilio Castillo, Chester D. Thompson) - 3:15
6. "(To Say the Least) You're the Most" (Johnny "Guitar" Watson) - 2:28
7. "Willing to Learn" (Emilio Castillo, Stephen "Doc" Kupka) - 4:35
8. "Give Me the Proof" (David Bartlett) - 2:35
9. "It Can Never Be the Same" (Bruce Conte, Stephen "Doc" Kupka, Emilio Castillo) - 4:43
10. "I Believe in Myself" (Emilio Castillo, Stephen "Doc" Kupka) - 2:00
11. "Walkin' Up Hip Street" (Chester D. Thompson) - 5:50

== Personnel ==
Tower of Power

- Lenny Williams – lead vocals (1, 2, 4−10)
- Chester D. Thompson – acoustic piano, clavinet, organ, ARP synthesizer, bass pedals, backing vocals (1, 4, 5, 7, 8), arrangements (5, 11)
- Bruce Conte – guitars, backing vocals (1, 4, 5, 7, 8)
- Francis Rocco Prestia – bass guitar
- David Bartlett – drums (1−6, 8−11), backing vocals (8)
- Lenny Pickett – alto and soprano saxophones, 1st tenor saxophone, all saxophone solos; clarinet, bass clarinet, alto flute
- Stephen "Doc" Kupka – baritone saxophone
- Emilio Castillo – 2nd tenor saxophone, backing vocals (1, 4, 5, 7, 8), lead vocals (3)
- Mic Gillette – trombone, trumpet, backing vocals (1, 4, 5, 7, 8), trumpet solo (11)
- Greg Adams – trumpet, flugelhorn, arrangements (1−4, 6−10), string arrangements and conductor

Additional musicians

- David Garibaldi – drums (7)
- Carter Collins – congas (7)
- Gerard Vinci – concertmaster
- Bootche Anderson – backing vocals (1, 2, 9, 10)
- Marilyn Scott – backing vocals (1, 2, 9, 10)
- Pepper Watkins – backing vocals (1, 2, 9, 10)

Production

- Emilio Castillo – producer
- Tower of Power – producers
- Alan Chinowsky – engineer
- Tom Flye – engineer
- Chris Morris – assistant engineer
- Kurt Kinzel – assistant engineer
- Bruce Steinberg – album design, liner photography

== Charts ==
=== Album ===
Chart (1975)	Peak position
Billboard Pop Albums	22
Billboard Top Soul Albums	19

=== Singles ===
Year	Single	Chart positions
Year	Single	US R&B
1975	"Willing to Learn"	77
1975	"Only So Much Oil in the Ground"	85
