= Cold Blood (band) =

American R&B horn funk band

- Also known as: Lydia Pense and Cold Blood
- Origin: Oakland, California, U.S.
- Genres: Rock, R&B, soul
- Years active: 1969–present
- Labels: San Francisco/Atlantic (1969); Reprise (1972); Warner Bros. Records (1974); ABC (1976); Dig Music (2005)
- Members: Lydia Pense; Dana Moret; Fred Ross; Steve Salinas; Steve Dunne; Evan Palmerston; John Halbleib; Rob Zuckerman; T. Moran
- Past members: Rich Armstrong; Rock Hendricks; Larry Field; Danny Hull; Larry Jonutz; Pat O'Hara; Raul Matute; Jerry Jonutz; David Padron; Rod Ellicott; Frank Davis; Sandy McKee; Alex Sarmiento; Skip Mesquite; Rob Moitoza; Billy Stogden; Michael Sasaki

Cold Blood is a long-standing R&B horn funk band founded by Larry Field in 1968, and was originally based in the East Bay region of the San Francisco Bay Area. The band has also performed and recorded under the name Lydia Pense and Cold Blood, due to the popularity of their lead singer, Lydia Pense.

== History ==
The band first came to prominence in 1969 when rock impresario Bill Graham signed them after an audition, and they played the Fillmore West in San Francisco. Pense has been compared to Janis Joplin, and it was Joplin who recommended the audition to Graham.

The term "East Bay Grease" has been used to describe the San Francisco Bay Area's brass horn heavy funk-rock sound of the 1960s, 1970s and 1980s; Cold Blood was one of the pioneer bands of this sound. Others were Tower of Power (who made an album called East Bay Grease). The Tower of Power horn players have performed with Cold Blood on a regular basis since the early 1970s. Skip Mesquite and Mic Gillette have been members of both Tower of Power and Cold Blood.

The band disbanded in the late 1970s. Pense suspended her music career in the early 1980s to raise her daughter Danielle, before re-forming the group in 1988. The band stabilized with its current membership in the 1990s. Cold Blood continues to record and perform today, and some former band members such as Raul Matute (and some from Tower of Power) appear on the band's most recent album.

Cold Blood were featured playing "You Got Me Hummin'" live in Fillmore: The Last Days, a documentary of the last concerts at the Fillmore West auditorium during July 1971.

== Personnel ==
Original band members were founder Larry Field (lead guitar), Lydia Pense (vocals), Danny Hull (tenor saxophone and songwriter), Larry Jonutz (trumpet; born March 15, 1947; died December 18, 2016), Pat O'Hara (trombone; born May 25, 1946 (?), died August 1977 of an overdose), Raul Matute (Hammond organ, piano, arranger and songwriter, born February 19, 1946), Jerry Jonutz (baritone, alto and tenor saxophone; born March 15, 1947), David Padron (trumpet; born May 4, 1946), Rod Ellicott (bass), and Frank Davis, who was replaced on drums by Sandy McKee (real name Cecil James Stoltie, born July 12, 1945, died October 10, 1995) during the Sisyphus sessions.

Current personnel are Pense (vocals), Steve Salinas (keyboards), Steve Dunne (guitar), Mike Morgan (percussion), Evan Palmerston (bass), Rich Armstrong (trumpet, cornet, percussion), Rob Zuckerman (alto, tenor, baritone saxes, and flute) and Donny Baldwin (drums).

=== Current members ===
- Lydia Pense - vocals
- Steve Salinas - keyboards
- Steve Dunne - guitar and vocals
- Evan Palmerston - bass and vocals
- John Halbleib - trumpet, flugelhorn, harmonica
- Rob Zuckerman - alto/tenor/bari sax, flute
- Dana Moret – vocals
- Fred Ross – vocals
- T. Moran – drums

=== Additional personnel ===
- Max Haskett - vocals, trumpet
- Bill Atwood - trumpet
- Stevie "Keys" Roseman - Hammond B-3 organ
- Jim Preston - drums
- Michael Sasaki - guitar
- Jeff Tamelier - guitar
- Tom Poole - horns
- Bill Slais - saxophone
- Michael White - bass

=== Former members ===
Over the years there have been various incarnations of the band, including singer/trumpet player Max Haskett (born 7 March 1947, died 15 September 1999, ex-Rubicon); Tower of Power horn player Mic Gillette; Journey keyboardist Stevie "Keys" Roseman on Hammond B-3 organ; Sons of Champlin drummer Jim Preston; Starship drummer T. Moran; guitar player Michael Sasaki (born June 24, 1951); Tower of Power guitarist Jeff Tamelier; Boz Scaggs horn player Tom Poole; Elvin Bishop sax player Bill Slais; bass player Michael White and others.

- Michael Sasaki - lead guitar
- Peter Welker - lead trumpet
- Mic Gillette - horns
- Danny Hull - tenor saxophone and songwriter
- Larry Jonutz - trumpet
- Pat O'Hara - trombone
- Raul Matute - Hammond organ, piano, arranger and songwriter
- Jerry Jonutz - saxophone
- David Padron - trumpet
- Rod Ellicott - bass
- Frank Davis - drums
- Sandy McKee - drums
- Alex Sarmiento - bass
- Skip Mesquite - tenor sax and vocals
- Michael Andreas - tenor sax
- Gaylord Birch - drums
- Eric Dunan - trumpet
- T Moran - drums
- Rob Moitoza - bass

- David Kessner - keyboards

== Discography ==
Their initial four albums, Cold Blood (produced by David Rubinson), Sisyphus (produced by Fred Catero), First Taste of Sin (produced by Donny Hathaway), and Thriller (produced by David Rubinson), remain their best-known work.

=== Albums ===
- Cold Blood (1969) (No. 23 US, No. 30 CAN)
- Sisyphus (1970) (No. 60 US)
- First Taste of Sin (1972) (No. 133 US)
- Thriller (1973)
- Lydia (1974)
- The Best of Cold Blood (1975)
- Lydia Pense and Cold Blood (1976), the last album before the band's hiatus
- Vintage Blood: Live! 1973 (live album, 2001)
- Transfusion (2005)
- Lydia Pense & Cold Blood: Live Blood (live album, 2008)
- Lydia Pense & Cold Blood, The River City Sessions (2011)
- Lydia Pense & Cold Blood, Soul of the Gypsy (2015)
- Lydia Pense & Cold Blood, Cold Blue Heart (2023)

=== Chart singles ===
- "You Got Me Hummin'" (1970, No. 52 Pop) (No. 51 CAN)
- "Too Many People" (1970, No. 107 'Bubbling Under' chart)
- "I'm a Good Woman" (1970, No. 125 'Bubbling Under' chart)
