= Fat City =

Fat City may refer to:

- Fat City (novel), a 1969 novel by Leonard Gardner
  - Fat City (film), a 1972 film adaptation, directed by John Huston
- "Fat City" (The King of Queens), a television episode
- Fat City Cycles, an American mountain bike company
- Fat City: How Washington Wastes Your Taxes, a 1980 book by Donald Lambro
- Fat City, a commercial district in Metairie, Louisiana, United States

== Music ==
- Fat City (Shawn Colvin album), 1992
- Fat City (The Sons of Champlin album), 1967
- Fat City Recordings, UK record label associated with Grand Central Records
- "Fat City", song by Airbourne from Runnin' Wild
- "Fat City (Slight Return)", song by The Twilight Singers from Blackberry Belle
- Starland Vocal Band, American pop band once known as Fat City
