= Bill Slais =

- Origin: Memphis, Tennessee
- Genres: Garage rock; soul
- Years active: 1962–present

Billy Slais is an American musician who was born and raised in Memphis, Tennessee, United States. He is a Vietnam veteran.

Slais has worked with: Melvin Seals, Allan Blazek, Dave Grover, Reni Slais, Bill Lamb, Ross Hayashida, Terry Hanck, Bob Claire, Chuck Brooke, Amos Garrett, Greg Adams, Mike Keck, Mic Gillette, Debbie Cathey, Tower of Power, Richard Betts, Maurice Cridlin, Carlo Driggs, Elvin Bishop, Mickey Thomas, Craig Chaquico, John Vernazza, Cold Blood, Lydia Pense, Donny Hathaway, the Hoodoo Rhythm Devils, Pacific Brass & Electric, the Coasters, Rufus Thomas, the Drifters, and the Platters.

== Selected discography ==
- Elvin Bishop – Struttin' My Stuff (1975) : Synthesizer, keyboards, vocals (bckgr).
- Elvin Bishop – Hometown Boy Makes Good! (1976) : Synthesizer, piano, keyboards, saxophone (alto and tenor), clavinet, electric saxophone, string ensemble.
- Mickey Thomas – As Long as You Love Me (1976) : Bass, saxophone, clavinet.
- Elvin Bishop – Raisin' Hell (1977) : Organ, synthesizer, keyboards, saxophone (alto and tenor), clavinet.
- Elvin Bishop – Best of Elvin Bishop (1979) : Keyboards.
- Amos Garrett – Go Cat Go (1991) : Saxophone.
- Elvin Bishop – Sure Feels Good: The Best of Elvin (1992) : Synthesizer, vocals (bckgr).
- Elvin Bishop – 20th Century Masters - The... (2002) : Organ, synthesizer, piano, saxophone (alto and tenor), vocals (bckgr), clavinet.
- Craig Chaquico – Follow the Sun (2009) – featuring "Circus Beach" co-written by Slais.
- Craig Chaquico – Fire Red Moon (2012) : Keyboards, vocals (bckgr).
