= So Very Hard to Go =

1973 single by Tower of Power

Single by Tower of Power

from the album Tower of Power
- B-side: "Clean Slate"
- Released: April 1973
- Recorded: 1972
- Genre: R&B
- Length: 3:37
- Label: Warner Bros.
- Songwriter(s): Emilio Castillo; Stephen Kupka
- Producer(s): Tower of Power

Tower of Power singles chronology
"You're Still a Young Man" (1972)	"So Very Hard to Go" (1973)	"What Is Hip?" (1973)

"So Very Hard to Go" is a torch song performed by American rhythm and blues band Tower of Power, issued as the second single from their eponymous third album. It was produced by the band and written by band members Emilio Castillo and Stephen Kupka, with Lenny Williams performing the vocals. The song is the band's biggest hit to date in the United States, peaking at No. 17 on the Hot 100 on 28 July 1973 and No. 4 on KHJ on 31 July 1973.

== Charts ==
=== Weekly charts ===
Chart (1973)	Peak position
US Billboard Hot 100	17
US R&B Singles (Billboard)	11
US Easy Listening (Billboard)	36

=== Year-end charts ===
Chart (1973)	Position
US Billboard Hot 100	76

== Cover versions ==
- "So Very Hard to Go" was covered by Filipino singer Martin Nievera for his 1999 album Return to Forever.
- "So Very Hard to Go" was covered by Dave Koz on his album Dave Koz and friends, with Michael McDonald on vocals.
- ”So Very Hard to Go" was covered in April 2022 by the Moscow-based Chicago tribute band Leonid and Friends featuring new singer Michael Puntov

== Popular culture ==
- The song appears in the 2016 video game Watch Dogs 2.
- The song also appears in the Academy Award Nominated 2002 Brazilian film City of God.
- The song also appears in the 2008 film Semi-Pro.
- The song also as played at the Oakland A’s final game in Oakland California
