= Thriller (Cold Blood album) =

Thriller!

Studio album by Cold Blood
- Released: 1973
- Recorded: 1973
- Studio: Wally Heider Studios (San Francisco); Funky Features (San Francisco)
- Genre: Funk
- Length: 41:24
- Label: Reprise Records
- Producer: David Rubinson & Friends, Inc.; Associate Producer: Raul Matute

Cold Blood chronology
| First Taste of Sin (1972) | Thriller! (1973) | Lydia (1974) |

Thriller! is a 1973 album by San Francisco funk group Cold Blood. Lydia Pense and the rest of Cold Blood were backed by The Pointer Sisters.

The album caused controversy because of its violent cover art. The cover was cited in 1978 in a congressional committee on domestic violence. The inside of the album cover, in the fold out, is the same model stabbing a man in the back.

== Track listing ==
Side A
| No. | Title | Writer(s) | Length |
|---|---|---|---|
| 1. | "Baby I Love You" | Jerry Ragovoy | 6:10 |
| 2. | "You Are the Sunshine of My Life" | Stevie Wonder | 7:40 |
| 3. | "Feel So Bad" | James Johnson, Leslie Temple (originally credited Chuck Willis as songwriter in error on the sleeve) | 7:22 |

Side B
| No. | Title | Writer(s) | Length |
|---|---|---|---|
| 4. | "Sleeping" | Richard Manuel, Robbie Robertson | 5:16 |
| 5. | "Live Your Dream" | Max Haskett | 3:21 |
| 6. | "I'll Be Long Gone" | Boz Scaggs | 5:40 |
| 7. | "Kissing My Love" | Bill Withers | 6:07 |
| Total length: | | | 41:24 |

== Personnel ==
Cold Blood

- Lydia Pense - vocals
- Michael Sasaki - electric and acoustic guitars
- Raul Matute - keyboards
- Max Haskett - trumpet, backing vocals
- Skip Mesquite - flute, saxophone, backing vocals
- Peter Weller - trumpet, flugelhorn
- Rod Ellicott - bass
- Gaylord Birch - drums, percussion

Additional personnel

- Mel Martin - baritone and tenor saxophone, flute
- Bill Atwood - trumpet, flugelhorn
- Bob Ferreira - tenor saxophone, flute
- Pat O'Hara - trombone
- John Mewborn - valve trombone, trumpet
- Bennie Maupin - tenor saxophone, bass clarinet
- Mike Andress - tenor saxophone
- Rigby Powell - trumpet
- Holly Tigard, Pointer Sisters - backing vocals

Technical

- Fred Catero, Jeremy Zatkin - engineer
- David Rubinson - remix engineer
