= Leonid and Friends =

Chicago tribute band

- Also known as: Chicagovich
- Origin: Russia
- Genres: Pop rock, jazz rock
- Years active: 2014–present
- Label: IEC Leonid Vorobyev
- Website: leonidandf.com

Leonid and Friends is a Chicago tribute band based in Moscow. They began as a YouTube band, and now tour the United States extensively in the spring and fall. Leonid Vorobyev (b. 7 Nov 1954 in Moscow, Russia), is the founder and leader of the band. Vorobyev is a multi-instrumentalist, a recording studio sound engineer and choir conductor by training, at the East Siberian Institute of Culture. Vorobyev made his first Chicago video recording of the song "Brand New Love Affair" in 2014.

With Ukrainian vocalist Serge Tiagniryadno, Leonid and Friends' YouTube videos have gone viral, with views in the millions. Leonid & Friends have recorded three Chicago tribute albums, titled Chicagovich.

After touring in Russia, the band first toured the United States in 2019. Starting in 2018, songs by Earth, Wind, & Fire, Blood, Sweat & Tears, Tower of Power, The Ides of March, Lighthouse and Steely Dan were added to the playlist. In 2022, their cover of Rufus and Chaka Khan's "Ain't Nobody" with Ksenia Buzina was added to the setlist.

Leonid Vorobyev's son, Roman Vorobyev (b. 1991), is the band's manager. The band's instrumental setup features bass and lead guitars, drums, keyboards, saxophone, trumpet and trombone, with occasional flugelhorn, French horn, flute, metal clarinet, cello and violin and miscellaneous percussion.

== Discography ==
=== Albums ===
Four self-released albums (vich is Russian for son of):

- Chicagovich - 50th Anniversary of the Band Chicago
- Chicagovich II
- Chicagovich III
- Oldies But Goldies Part 1
  - NOTE: This is their first album of non-Chicago covers, featuring covers of Earth, Wind, and Fire, Blood Sweat and Tears, Steely Dan, Tower Of Power, The Ides of March, Chaka Khan, Deep Purple, The Brecker Brothers, Stevie Wonder, and The Black Russian Band.

=== Singles ===
- "The Speck of Dust" - a Leonid and Friends original single with lead vocals by Buzina Kseniya Yurievna, released in 2021 (written by Alexey Ashtaev, lyrics by Leonid Vorobyev and Roman Vorobyev)
- "Superstar" by Ksenia Buzina and Leonid and Friends, a Carpenters cover, was released in September 2023.
- "Ain't Nobody" with lead vocals by Buzina Kseniya Yurievna, a Rufus and Chaka Khan cover, released in September 2022.

== Tours ==
Leonid and Friends currently tours with about 11 musicians, from Russia, Ukraine, Moldova, and Belarus. Prior to 2019, the band performed exclusively in Russia. In 2019, the band embarked on their first tour of the United States, the Fancy Colours Tour, and later followed with two more sold-out tours in 2019. On the occasion of their date in Arlington Heights in July 2019, the band was joined on stage by Chicago's original drummer Danny Seraphine. The 2020 tour was canceled due to the COVID-19 pandemic. Leonid and Friends toured the United States again in 2021, with the Feeling Stronger Every Day Tour, and once more in 2022. In late 2023, the group embarked on yet another tour of the United States.

In 2024, the band performed their first cruise gig, On The Blue Cruise: The World's Greatest Classic Rock Music Cruise from Miami to Puerto Plata and Nassau, as part of a bill with other bands. The cruise took place on the Norwegian Pearl from April 5-10. In 2026, the band is currently on their Make Me Smile Tour across the US.

== Members ==
=== Current members ===
- Leonid Vorobyev – transcribes, bass guitar, keyboards, piano, synth, backing and lead vocals (2014–present)
- Igor Javad-Zade – drums, percussion (2014–present)
- Vasily Akimov – lead and backing vocals, percussion, occasional rhythm guitar (2014–present)
- Ksenia Buzina – backing and lead vocals, percussion (2016–present)
- Oleg Kudryavtsev – tenor and alto saxophones, flute, percussion, backing vocals (2017–present)
- Maxim Likhachev – trombone, percussion (2017–present)
- Sergey Kurmaev – keyboards, backing vocals (2020–present)
- Konstantin Kovachev – lead guitar (2021–present)
- Danil Buranov – lead and backing vocals, percussion (2021–present)
- Mikhail Puntov – lead and backing vocals, rhythm guitar, percussion (2022–present; touring substitute 2021; not touring 2026–present)
- Pasha Karchevsky – trumpet (2026–present)
- Taimuraz Khadartsev – lead and backing vocals (2026–present)
- Bobby Alcott – lead and backing vocals, percussion (touring substitute 2026)

=== Past members ===
- Serge Tiagnyriadno – lead and backing vocals, rhythm guitar, keyboards, percussion (2015–2022) Serge returned to Ukraine to fight in the 2022 Russian invasion of Ukraine
- Dmitry Maximov – bass guitar (2014–2015)
- Sergey Kashirin – lead guitar, lead and backing vocals (2014–2021)
- Alexey Batychenko – trumpet, flugelhorn (2014–2017; died 2021)
- Alexandr Michurin – trombone, percussion (2014–2017, guest on "You Are on My Mind" and "Beginnings")
- Konstantin Gorshkov – tenor saxophone (2014–2017)
- Vladimir Popov – baritone and alto saxophones, flute, percussion, backing vocals (2015–2020)
- Vlad Senchillo – keyboards, backing vocals (2016–2020)
- Andrey Zyl – trumpet, flugelhorn (2017–2022)
- Valery Martynov – trumpet (2022–2026)

=== Other contributors ===
- Arkady Shilkloper - French horn on "Hard to Say I'm Sorry"
- Vladimir Osinsky – piano on "Colour My World"
- Ilya Prokudin – trumpet, flugelhorn on "You Are on My Mind" and "Spinning Wheel"
- Daniil Dubrovsky – alto, soprano and tenor saxophones on "Beginnings", "Street Player", "Hanky Panky/Life Saver", "Mongonucleosis" and "After the Love Has Gone"
- Ilya Vymenits – congas on "Hot Streets" and "Street Player"
- Jorgito Nunez – congas on "Hanky Panky/Life Saver"
- Rei Frometa – congas on "Call on Me", "Happy Man", "(I've Been) Searchin' So Long", "Mongonucleosis", "The Speck of Dust" and "So Very Hard to Go"
- Olga Andreeva – trumpet on "Got to Get You into My Life"
- Roman Vorobyev – backing vocals and handclaps on "East River" and "Mongonucleosis" (also manager)
- Igor Baydikov – backing vocals and handclaps on "East River" and "Mongonucleosis"
- Yan Senchillo – backing vocals and handclaps on "East River" and "Mongonucleosis"
- Artur Gilfanov – trombone, percussion on "Mongonucleosis"
- Evgeny Kondratyev – trumpet, flugelhorn, percussion on "Mongonucleosis" and "After the Love Has Gone"
- Roman Koshkarov – keyboards on "If You Leave Me Now"
- Jacob Zakh – keyboards on "Just You 'n' Me", "You're the Inspiration" and "After the Love Has Gone"
- Mikhail Spasibo – keyboards on "Just You 'n' Me"
- Suren Kocharyan – baritone saxophone on "My Old School"
- Kirill Stekhov – alto saxophone on "My Old School"
- Dmitry Andrianov – guitar on "Ain't It Blue?"
- Dmitry Gorevoy – baritone saxophone on "So Very Hard to Go"

Most members are from Moscow, though Tiagnyriadno, Kashirin, Zyl, Kurmaev and Kovachev hail from Ukraine, Moldova, Belarus, Kyrgyzstan and Kazakhstan respectively.
