= Josh Pfeiffer =

American singer, songwriter and music producer

- Birth name: Joshua Randall Pfeiffer
- Born: June 27, 1973 (age 51); Sonora, California, U.S.
- Genres: Jazz, pop, country
- Occupations: Singer; songwriter; music producer
- Years active: 2010–present
- Website: joshpfeiffer.com

Joshua Randall Pfeiffer (born June 27, 1973) is an American singer, songwriter and music producer.

== Early life ==
He received Outstanding Musicianship Awards at the Santa Cruz Jazz Festival, Redding Jazz Festival, and Fullerton Jazz Festival. Pfeiffer received a number of music scholarships after graduating.

== Career ==
=== American Crooner Act:1 ===
In 2010, Josh made his debut with American Crooner Act:1, a jazz music album, featuring cover versions of Big Band standards as well as original compositions, Life, Beautiful Girl, California Days, When I'm With You, and Where I Want To Be. The album features the late Tower Of Power founding member and trumpet player Mic Gillette, as well as pianist Kent Gripenstraw.

=== Brand New Shoes ===
In late 2017, Pfeiffer released his single and music video entitled Brand New Shoes. The song was written and co-produced by David Schram, engineered by Adam Munoz and mixed by Grammy Award winner Joe Chiccarelli.

=== One More Time ===
On November 17, 2018, Pfeiffer released the single and music One More Time. It is the artists first release in the country music genre. The collaborative team for One More Time included David Hawkes on drums, Shawn Tubbs on pedal steel, Kevin Jachetta on piano, and co producer David Schram on rhythm guitar, bass, and ukulele. One More Time is also one of the last songs recorded and produced at Berkeley, California's legendary Fantasy Studios, before its closing on September 15, 2018. The single reached #57 on the UK Official Singles Sales Top 100 Chart for the week of December 28, 2018.

=== Dancing Girl (feat. Mic Gillette & Shawn Tubbs) ===
On August 1, 2019, Pfeiffer released the single Dancing Girl (feat. Mic Gillette & Shawn Tubbs). The song was written by Pfeiffer and co produced by Pfeiffer and David Schram. The song posthumously features Josh's friend and mentor Mic Gillette, who died in 2016. Gillette, who is best known as a founding member of Tower Of Power, arranged and recorded most of the horn parts prior to his untimely death. The song also features lead guitarist Shawn Tubbs. Additional credits include David Hawkes on drums, Kevin Jachetta on keys, David Schram on bass and rhythm guitar, and Gordon Giedt on Saxophone. The song was engineered and mixed by Adam Munoz and mastered by Ken Lee. Like Pfeiffer's previous release One More Time, Dancing Girl was one of the last projects recorded at Fantasy Studios in Berkeley, California before the studio closed in late 2018.

== Personal life ==
He is married to Tara Pfeiffer, and the couple has three children, David, Tamara, and Hannah Pfeiffer. The couple currently resides in Sacramento, California. He is an automobile enthusiast, and a partner with his brother Justin Pfeiffer in the California-based automotive reconditioning company Pro Finish. Josh is an active vegan, and an advocate for a plant-based diet. He made the vegan lifestyle change in June 2017 after seeing the positive impact it had on his wife and daughters.

== Discography ==
=== Albums ===
American Crooner Act: 1 (2010)

=== Singles ===
Life (2017)

Brand New Shoes (2017)

California Days feat. Mic Gillette (2018)

One More Time (2018)

Dancing Girl feat. Mic Gillette & Shawn Tubbs (2019)

== Chart history ==
Title	UK Official Singles Sales Top 100
One More Time	57
