= List of Starship members =

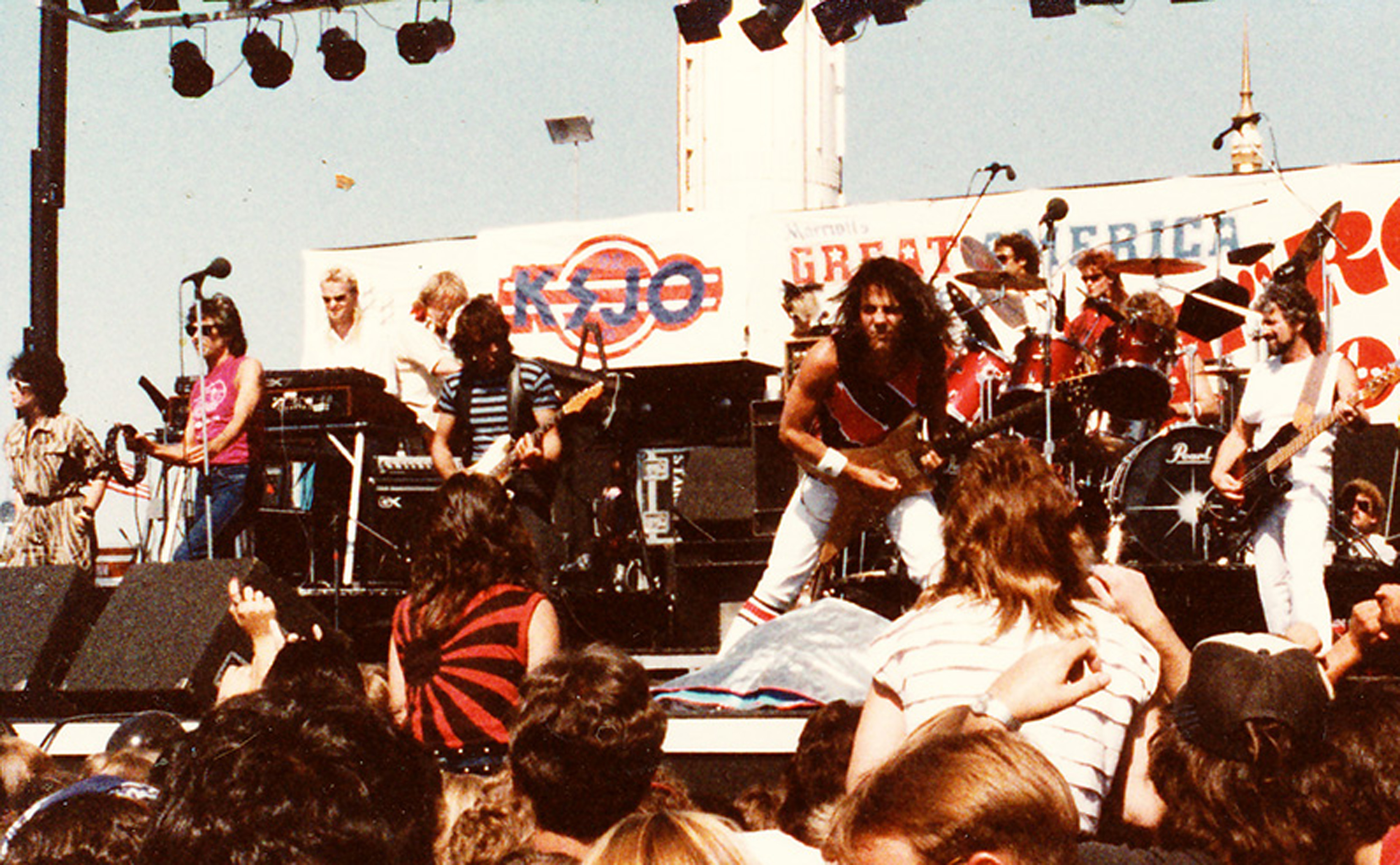
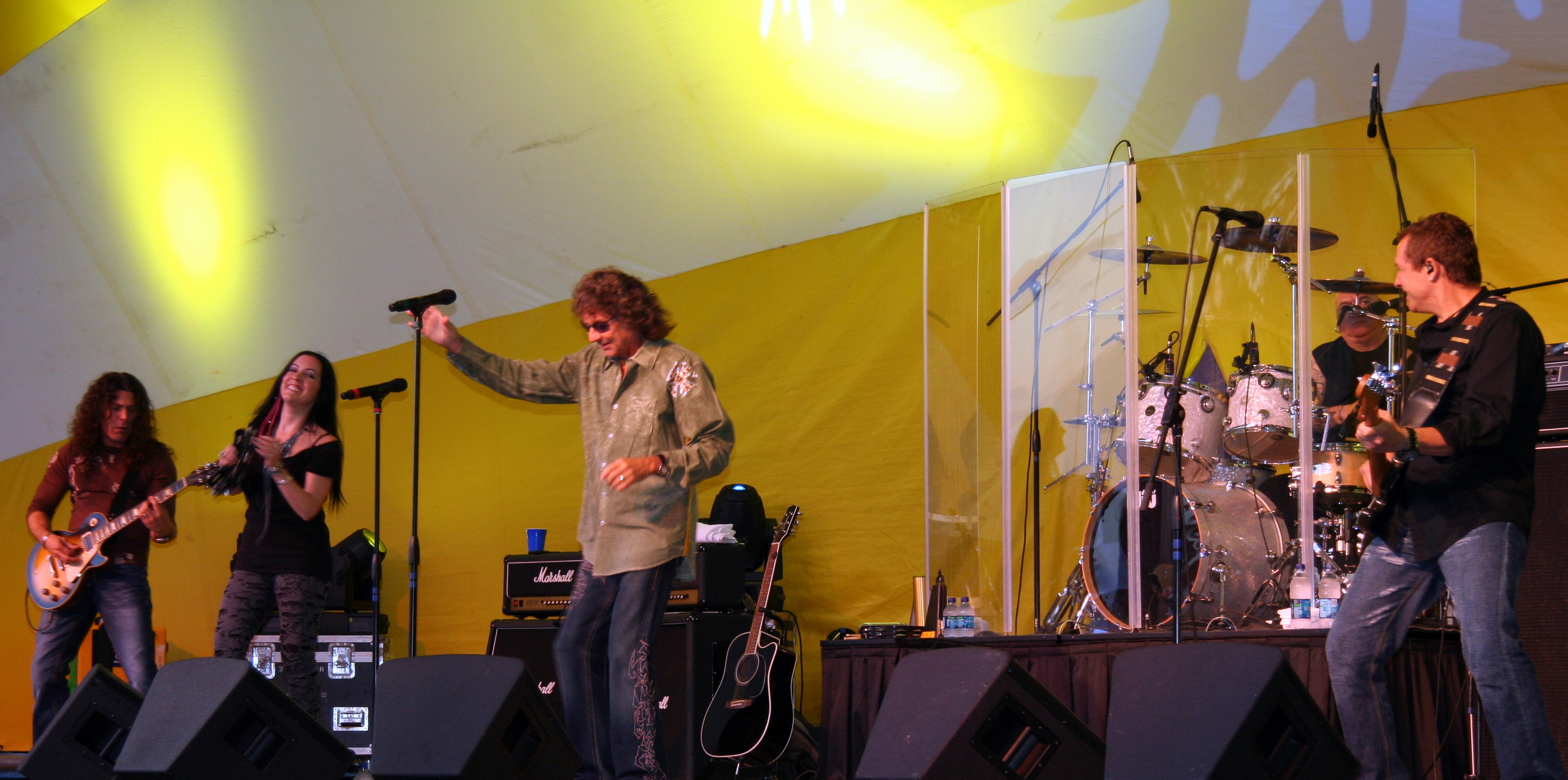
Top: A lineup of Jefferson Starship performing live in 1984, shortly before Paul Kantner and David Freiberg left and the band became Starship.
Bottom: A lineup of Starship featuring Mickey Thomas performing live in 2010.

Starship is an American rock band from San Francisco, California. A successor to Jefferson Starship, the group originally featured vocalists Mickey Thomas and Grace Slick, guitarist Craig Chaquico, bassist Pete Sears, drummer Donny Baldwin and keyboardist David Freiberg – all were members of Jefferson Starship until October 1984, when rhythm guitarist and vocalist Paul Kantner (who had left in June) sued the band for the use of the name, forcing them to begin operating as simply Starship. Freiberg left shortly after the group's formation, however, due to the dominance of keyboards in the band's sound. Sears left early into sessions for the group's second album No Protection, citing an opposition to the band's continued evolution into what he described as a "vacuous, sterilized, escapist" musical style.

Slick also departed Starship in early 1988, leaving Thomas as the band's sole lead vocalist. Bassist Brett Bloomfield and keyboardist Mark Morgan were added to the group's lineup in time for the recording of Love Among the Cannibals, having both performed as touring members since the previous year. Baldwin was next to leave, after seriously injuring Thomas in a bar fight before a show on September 24, 1989; Baldwin's involvement in the fight was initially kept secret, but within a few weeks of the incident he was dismissed from the group. Once Thomas had recovered, the tour resumed in early 1990 with Kenny Stavropoulos on drums. After the tour's conclusion in the summer of 1990, Chaquico, Bloomfield, Morgan, and Stavropoulos left the band. Thomas added producer Peter Wolf on keyboards and continued to record by utilizing session musicians. After the release of the greatest hits compilation Greatest Hits (Ten Years and Change 1979–1991) in the spring of 1991, the band was let go by RCA. Starship became inactive at this time.

In early 1992, Thomas reformed the band under the name "Mickey Thomas' Starship" (later "Starship featuring Mickey Thomas"), with a lineup also including guitarist Jeff Tamelier, bassist Bobby Vega, drummer T. Moran, keyboardist John Lee Sanders, saxophonist Bill Slais, trumpeter Max Haskett and former touring vocalist Melisa Kary. The following year, Vega was replaced by the returning Bloomfield. In 1995, Darrell Verdusco replaced Moran on drums. Sanders, Slais and Haskett also left in 1995, with Phil Bennett taking over on keyboards. Tamelier was replaced by Erik Torjesen in 1996, who performed with the group until 2000 when he was diagnosed with cancer (he died the following March). John Garnache replaced Bloomfield on bass in 1997. Torjesen was replaced by Mark Abrahamian in 2000, while Jeff Adams replaced Garnache the same year. Stephanie Calvert joined in 2006. Abrahamian died on September 2, 2012, after suffering a heart attack after a show. He was replaced the following month by Winger guitarist John Roth. In September 2021, vocalist Cian Coey replaced Calvert. In November 2024, Chelsee Foster replaced Coey on vocals. In April 2026, August Zadra replaced John Roth as guitarist.

== Members ==
=== Current ===
Image	Name	Years active	Instruments	Release contributions
	Mickey Thomas	1984–1991; 1992–present	lead and backing vocals; rhythm guitar	all Starship releases
	Darrell Verdusco	1995–present	drums; backing vocals	Live at the Stanley Cup (1997); Greatest Hits (2003); Loveless Fascination (2013)
	Phil Bennett	1995–present	keyboards; backing vocals	Live at the Stanley Cup (1997); Greatest Hits (2003); Loveless Fascination (2013)
	Jeff Adams	2000–present	bass; backing vocals	Greatest Hits (2003); Loveless Fascination (2013)
	Chelsee Foster	2024–present	lead and backing vocals	none
	August Zadra	2026–present	lead guitar; backing vocals	none

=== Former ===
Image	Name	Years active	Instruments	Release contributions
	Craig Chaquico	1984–1990	lead guitar	Knee Deep in the Hoopla (1985); No Protection (1987); Love Among the Cannibals (1989)
	Donny Baldwin	1984–1989	drums; electronic drums; backing vocals	Knee Deep in the Hoopla (1985); No Protection (1987); Love Among the Cannibals (1989)
	Grace Slick	1984–1988	lead and backing vocals	Knee Deep in the Hoopla (1985); No Protection (1987)
	Pete Sears	1984–1987	bass; keyboards; synthesizers; backing vocals	Knee Deep in the Hoopla (1985)
	David Freiberg	1984–1985	keyboards; bass; backing vocals	none
	Brett Bloomfield	1987–1990; 1993–1997	bass; backing vocals	Love Among the Cannibals (1989); Live at the Stanley Cup (1997)
	Mark Morgan	1987–1990	keyboards	Love Among the Cannibals (1989)
	Melisa Kary	1989–1990 (touring only); 1992–2000	lead and backing vocals	Live at the Stanley Cup (1997)
	Christina Marie Saxton	1989–1990 (touring only); 1996–2006	lead and backing vocals	Live at the Stanley Cup (1997)
	Kenny Stavropoulos	1990	drums; backing vocals	none
	Peter Wolf	1990–1991	keyboards; electronics	"Good Heart" (1991)
	Jeff Tamelier	1992–1996	lead guitar; backing vocals	none
	T. Moran	1992–1995	drums	none
	John Lee Sanders	1992–1995	keyboards; saxophone	none
	Bill Slais	1992–1995	saxophone; keyboards	none
	Max Haskett	1992–1995	trumpet	none
	Bobby Vega	1992–1993	bass	none
	Erik Torjesen	1996–2000	lead guitar	Live at the Stanley Cup (1997)
	John Garnache	1997–2000	bass	none
	Mark Abrahamian	2000–2012 (his death)	lead guitar	Greatest Hits (2003)
	Stephanie Calvert	2006–2021	lead and backing vocals	Loveless Fascination (2013)
	John Roth	2012–2026	lead guitar; backing vocals	Loveless Fascination (2013)
	Cian Coey	2021–2024	lead and backing vocals	none

== Lineups ==
Period	Members	Releases
June 1984 – early 1985	Mickey Thomas – lead vocals; Grace Slick – lead vocals; Craig Chaquico – guitar; Pete Sears – bass, keyboards, synthesizers; David Freiberg – keyboards, bass, vocals; Donny Baldwin – drums, backing vocals; Touring personnel: Gabriel Katona – keyboards, saxophone (1984–1986 tours)	none
Early 1985 – May 1987	Mickey Thomas – lead vocals; Grace Slick – lead vocals; Craig Chaquico – guitar; Pete Sears – bass, keyboards, synthesizers; Donny Baldwin – drums, backing vocals; Touring personnel: Gabriel Katona – keyboards, saxophone (1984–1986 tours)	Knee Deep in the Hoopla (1985)
May 1987 – February 1988	Mickey Thomas – lead vocals; Grace Slick – lead vocals; Craig Chaquico – guitar; Donny Baldwin – drums, backing vocals; Touring personnel: Brett Bloomfield – bass; Mark Morgan – keyboards, synthesizers	No Protection (1987)
February 1988 – October 1989	Mickey Thomas – lead vocals; Craig Chaquico – guitar; Brett Bloomfield – bass, backing vocals; Mark Morgan – keyboards, synthesizers; Donny Baldwin – drums, backing vocals; Touring personnel: Melisa Kary – vocals (1989); Christina Marie Saxton – vocals (1989)	Love Among the Cannibals (1989)
October 1989 – summer 1990	Mickey Thomas – lead vocals; Craig Chaquico – guitar; Brett Bloomfield – bass, backing vocals; Mark Morgan – keyboards, synthesizers; Kenny Stavropoulos – drums; Touring personnel: Melisa Kary – vocals; Christina Marie Saxton – vocals	none
Summer 1990 – spring 1991	Mickey Thomas – lead vocals; Peter Wolf – keyboards, electronics; Studio musicians: Martin Page – background vocals (1991 – Track: "Good Heart"); Peter Maunu – guitar (1991 – Track: "Good Heart")	"Good Heart" (1991)
Band inactive spring 1991 – early 1992
Early 1992 – summer 1993	Mickey Thomas – lead vocals, rhythm guitar; Melisa Kary – lead vocals; Jeff Tamelier – lead guitar, backing vocals; Bobby Vega – bass, backing vocals; John Lee Sanders – keyboards, saxophone; T. Moran – drums; Bill Slais – saxophone, keyboards; Max Haskett – trumpet	none
Summer 1993 – 1995	Mickey Thomas – lead vocals, rhythm guitar; Melisa Kary – lead vocals; Jeff Tamelier – lead guitar, backing vocals; Brett Bloomfield – bass, backing vocals; John Lee Sanders – keyboards, saxophone; T. Moran – drums; Bill Slais – saxophone, keyboards	none
1995–1996	Mickey Thomas – lead vocals, rhythm guitar; Melisa Kary – lead vocals; Jeff Tamelier – lead guitar, backing vocals; Brett Bloomfield – bass, backing vocals; Phil Bennett – keyboards, backing vocals; Darrell Verdusco – drums, backing vocals	none
1996–1997	Mickey Thomas – lead vocals, rhythm guitar; Melisa Kary – lead vocals; Christina Marie Saxton – lead vocals; Erik Torjesen – lead guitar; Brett Bloomfield – bass, backing vocals; Phil Bennett – keyboards, backing vocals; Darrell Verdusco – drums, backing vocals	Live at the Stanley Cup (1997)
1997–2000	Mickey Thomas – lead vocals, rhythm guitar; Melisa Kary – lead vocals; Christina Marie Saxton – lead vocals; Erik Torjesen – lead guitar; John Garnache – bass; Phil Bennett – keyboards, backing vocals; Darrell Verdusco – drums, backing vocals	none
2000–2006	Mickey Thomas – lead vocals, rhythm guitar; Christina Marie Saxton – lead vocals; Mark Abrahamian – lead guitar; Jeff Adams – bass, backing vocals; Phil Bennett – keyboards, backing vocals; Darrell Verdusco – drums, backing vocals	Greatest Hits (2003)
2006 – September 2012	Mickey Thomas – lead vocals, rhythm guitar; Stephanie Calvert – lead vocals; Mark Abrahamian – lead guitar; Jeff Adams – bass, backing vocals; Phil Bennett – keyboards, backing vocals; Darrell Verdusco – drums, backing vocals	none
October 2012 – September 2021	Mickey Thomas – lead vocals, rhythm guitar; Stephanie Calvert – lead vocals; John Roth – lead guitar, backing vocals; Jeff Adams – bass, backing vocals; Phil Bennett – keyboards, backing vocals; Darrell Verdusco – drums, backing vocals; Touring personnel: Cian Coey – lead vocals (substitute for Calvert in August-September 2021)	Loveless Fascination (2013)
September 2021 – November 2024	Mickey Thomas – lead vocals, rhythm guitar; Cian Coey – lead vocals; John Roth – lead guitar, backing vocals; Jeff Adams – bass, backing vocals; Phil Bennett – keyboards, backing vocals; Darrell Verdusco – drums, backing vocals	none
November 2024 – April 2026	Mickey Thomas – lead vocals, rhythm guitar; Chelsee Foster – lead vocals; John Roth – lead guitar, backing vocals; Jeff Adams – bass, backing vocals; Phil Bennett – keyboards, backing vocals; Darrell Verdusco – drums, backing vocals	none
April 2026 – present	Mickey Thomas – lead vocals, rhythm guitar; Chelsee Foster – lead vocals; August Zadra – lead guitar, backing vocals; Jeff Adams – bass, backing vocals; Phil Bennett – keyboards, backing vocals; Darrell Verdusco – drums, backing vocals	none

== See also ==
- List of Jefferson Airplane members
- List of Jefferson Starship members
