= Cold-blooded =

Cold-blooded is an informal term for one or more of a group of characteristics that determine an animal's thermophysiology. These include:

- Ectothermy, controlling body temperature through external processes, such as by basking in the sun
- Poikilothermy, the ability of an organism to function over a wide internal temperature range
- Bradymetabolism, the ability to greatly alter metabolic rate in response to need; for example, animals that hibernate

Cold blooded and Coldblooded may also refer to:

== Music ==
- Cold Blooded (Rick James album), 1983
  - "Cold Blooded" (song), the title track from the album
- "Coldblooded" (James Brown song), a 1974 funk song
- Coldblooded (album), a 1974 funk album by The Bar-Kays
- "Cold Blooded", a song by Damageplan from the 2004 album New Found Power
- Cold Blooded (EP), a 2013 EP by Datsik

== Films ==
- Coldblooded (film), a 1995 American dark comedy/thriller
- Cold Blooded (film), a 2012 Canadian crime thriller

== Other ==
- Cold-blooded, a person or act said to be lacking in conscience
- Cold-blood (horse), a horse bred for strength and calmness, such as a draft horse
- "Cold Blooded" (Grimm), an episode of the TV series Grimm

== See also ==
- Cold blood (disambiguation)
- In Cold Blood (disambiguation)
- Thermoregulation
- Endotherm
- Warm-blooded
