= First Taste of Sin =

Studio album by Cold Blood
- Released: 1972
- Recorded: 1972
- Studio: Wally Heider Studios, San Francisco & Los Angeles, California
- Genre: Soul, rock, jazz
- Length: 36:38
- Label: Reprise Records
- Producer: Donny Hathaway

Cold Blood chronology
Sisyphus (1971)	First Taste of Sin (1972)	Thriller (1973)

Professional ratings
Review scores
Source	Rating
Allmusic	3/5 stars

First Taste of Sin is the third album by the Oakland, California band Cold Blood, and their first for Reprise Records. This album is noted for being produced by soul singer/musician Donny Hathaway. It also includes the original version of Hathaway's "Valdez in the Country", which Hathaway himself would record the next year for his 1973 album Extension of a Man.

== Track listing ==
Side A
No.	Title	Writer(s)	Length
1.	"Visions"	Donny Baldwin, Boroquez	3:19
2.	"Lo and Behold"	James Taylor	4:12
3.	"Down to the Bone"	Danny Hull, Cecil Stoltie	5:19
4.	"You Had to Know"	Donny Hathaway	5:47

Side B
No.	Title	Writer(s)	Length
5.	"My Lady Woman"	Hull, Stoltie	4:01
6.	"No Way Home"	Hull, Raul Matule	3:23
7.	"Inside Your Soul"	Max Haskett	3:26
8.	"All My Honey"	Hull, Stoltie	3:27
9.	"Valdez in the Country"	Hathaway	3:44
Total length:			36:38

== Personnel ==
- Lydia Pense - lead vocals
- Sandy McKee - drums, vocals
- Raul Matute - organ, piano
- Rod Ellicott - bass
- Michael Sasaki - guitar
- Paul Beaver - Moog synthesizer
- Mel Martin - flute, tenor and baritone saxophone
- Danny Hull, Pete Christlieb - tenor saxophone
- Bill Baker - alto and baritone saxophone
- Gordon Messick, Pat O'Hara - trombone
- Max Haskett - trumpet, vocals
- Bill Atwood - trumpet
- Ernest Diridoni - tuba
- Donny Hathaway - piano, organ
- Pete Escovedo - congas
- Coke Escovedo - timbales, percussion

Technical

- Richard Moore - engineer
- Wally Heider - recording
- Marty Evans - cover photography

== Charts ==
Chart (1972)	Peak position
Billboard Top LP's & Tape	133
