= Geir Flikke =

Norwegian political scientist

Geir Flikke (born 1963) is a professor at the University of Oslo.

He graduated from the University of Oslo with the cand.philol. degree in 1993, and took the dr.art. degree in 2006 with the dissertation The Failure of a Movement: The Rise and Decline of Democratic Russia 1989-1992. From 2002 to 2006 he worked as a researcher at the Norwegian Institute of International Affairs, in 2006 he was promoted to Assisting Director. From 2013, Geir Flikke is Associated Professor at the University of Oslo, specializing in Russian studies, and since 2019, professor.

Flikke has led the Research Council of Norway (RCN) sponsored project New Political Groups and the Russian State (NEPORUS) (2014–2017), and was in 2020 awarded a new RCN project National Values and Political Reforms in Post-Maidan Ukraine (https://www.hf.uio.no/om/aktuelt/aktuelle-saker/2020/10-2-millioner-til-ukraina-prosjekt.html).

Flikke has been active in Norwegian politics as well. From 1999 to 2000 he worked as a political advisor for the Conservative Party parliamentary group, and in the period from 2011 to 2019, he is a member of the Sjur Lindebrække Committee for human rights (Conservative party). In 2017, he was a key-note speaker at the Norwegian Atlantic Committee's seminar series on security politics.

Flikke was nominated as a stand-in member to the Nobel Committee for the committee member Kristin Clemet (Conservative Party) in December 2020. He will serve in this capacity from 2021 to 2023 (https://www.nrk.no/urix/hoyre-vil-ha-kristin-clemet-inn-i-nobelkomiteen-1.15256821). In December 2023, the Storting renewed this nomination for another 3 years, starting from January 2024 (https://www.stortinget.no/no/Saker-og-publikasjoner/Publikasjoner/Innstillinger/Stortinget/2023-2024/inns-202324-125s/?all=true).

For professional homepage at the University of Oslo, see: https://www.hf.uio.no/ilos/english/people/aca/geirfli/index.html.

Selected works:

- Flikke, Geir (2018). Becoming Extinct? Russian Human Rights Activism and the Observer Commissions. Russian Politics. ISSN 2451-8913. 3(1), s 25- 57 . doi: 10.1163/2451-8921-00301002
- Flikke, Geir (2018). Conflicting Opportunities or Patronal Politics? Restrictive NGO Legislation in Russia 2012–2015. Europe-Asia Studies. ISSN 0966-8136. 70(4), s 564- 590 . doi: 10.1080/09668136.2018.1455806
- Flikke, Geir (2017). “Monstrations for Mocracy”: Framing Absurdity and Irony in Russia’s Youth Mobilization. The Journal of Post-Soviet Democratization. ISSN 1074-6846. 25(3), s 305- 334
- Flikke, Geir (2017). The Sword of Damocles. State Governability in Putin's Third Term. Problems of Post-Communism. ISSN 1075-8216. 65(6), s 434- 446 . doi: 10.1080/10758216.2017.1291308
- Flikke, Geir (2016). Canaries in a Coal Mine: The uphill struggle of Russia's non-system liberals. The Journal of Post-Soviet Democratization. ISSN 1074-6846. 24(3), s 291- 325
- Flikke, Geir (2016). Resurgent Authoritarianism: the case of Russia's new NGO legislation. Post-Soviet Affairs. ISSN 1060-586X. 32(2), s 103- 131 . doi: 10.1080/1060586X.2015.1034981
- Flikke, Geir (2016). Sino-Russian Relations: Status Exchange or Imbalanced Relationship?. Problems of Post-Communism. ISSN 1075-8216. 63(3), s 159- 170 . doi: 10.1080/10758216.2016.1163227
- Flikke, Geir (2014). An Arctic Home? The Arctic Policies of Norway and Russia, In Robin M. Allers; Carlo Masala & Rolf Tamnes (ed.), Common or Divided Security? German and Norwegian Perspectives on Euro-Atlantic Security. Peter Lang Publishing Group. ISBN 978-3-631-64627-4. 5. s 105 - 124
- Flikke, Geir (2013). Collusive Status-Seeking: The Sino-Russian Relationship, In Stephen Blank (ed.), Central Asia after 2014. Strategic Studies Institute of the US Army War College. ISBN 1-58487-593-3. Chapter 3. s 33 - 80
- Flikke, Geir (2012). Eastward Bound? Options and Limitations in the EU's Eastern Dimension. Studia Diplomatica. ISSN 0770-2965. LXV(1), s 79- 90
- Flikke, Geir (2012). Grand Bargain or Grand Strategy: The Obama Administration and U.S. Policy toward Russia, In Mark J. Miller & Bahram M. Rajaee (ed.), National Security Under the Obama Administration. Palgrave Macmillan. ISBN 978-0-230-11682-5. 4. s 83 - 104
- Flikke, Geir (2011). Fasetter av globaliseringens maktforskyvninger: statskapitalisme, sikkerhetsprivatisering og multipolaritet. Internasjonal Politikk. ISSN 0020-577X. 69(2), s 321- 332
- Flikke, Geir (2011). Norway and the Arctic: Between Multilateral Governance and Geopolitics, In James Kraska (ed.), Arctic Security in an Age of Climate Change. Cambridge University Press. ISBN 9781107006607. 5. s 64 - 84
- Rowe, Elana Tovah Wilson & Flikke, Geir (2011). Modernization and Governance in the High North, In Anatoli Bourmistrov (ed.), Perspectives on Norwegian-Russian Energy Cooperation. Cappelen Damm Akademisk. ISBN 978-82-02-36763-3. 9. s 112 - 127
- Wilhelmsen, Julie Maria & Flikke, Geir (2011). Chinese-Russian Convergence and Central Asia. Geopolitics. ISSN 1465-0045. 16(4), s 865- 901 . doi: 10.1080/14650045.2010.505119
- Flikke, Geir & Torjesen, Stina (2009). EU og NATO: Utvidelse og naboskapspolitikk som sikkerhetspolitiske instrument, I: Walter Carlsnaes & Pernille Rieker (red.), Nye utfordringer for europeisk sikkerhetspolitikk. Aktører, instrumenter og operasjoner. Universitetsforlaget. ISBN 9788215013848. kapittel 8.
