= In Cold Blood (disambiguation) =

In Cold Blood is a 1966 book by Truman Capote.

In Cold Blood may also refer to:

== Related to the book ==
- In Cold Blood (film), a 1967 American film
- In Cold Blood (soundtrack), a soundtrack album from the film
- In Cold Blood (miniseries), a 1996 American television miniseries

== Music ==
- In Cold Blood (Johnny Thunders album) or the title song, 1983
- In Cold Blood (The Legendary Tigerman album) or the title song, 2004
- In Cold Blood (Malevolent Creation album) or the title song, 1997
- In Cold Blood, an album by White Sea (Morgan Kibby), 2014
- "In Cold Blood" (alt-J song), 2017
- "In Cold Blood", a song by Rick Ross from Deeper Than Rap, 2009
- "In Cold Blood", a song by Scarface from The Fix, 2002
- In Cold Blood, a metal hardcore band formerly signed to Victory Records

== Other uses ==
- In Cold Blood (Singaporean TV series), a 2011–2013 docudrama series
- In Cold Blood (South Korean TV series), an upcoming drama series
- In Cold Blood (video game), a 2000 video game by Revolution Software

== See also ==
- Cold blood (disambiguation)
- Cold-blooded (disambiguation)
- Life in Cold Blood, a BBC nature documentary series by David Attenborough
