= Tower of Power (album) =

Studio album by Tower of Power
- Released: May 1973
- Recorded: 1973
- Studio: Wally Heider (San Francisco)
- Genres: Soul, funk, jazz-funk
- Length: 39:56
- Label: Warner Bros.
- Producer: Tower of Power

Tower of Power chronology
Bump City (1972)	Tower of Power (1973)	Back to Oakland (1974)

Tower of Power is the third studio album by American soul and funk band Tower of Power. Released in May 1973 by Warner Bros. Records, the album peaked at No. 15 on the Billboard Top LPs chart in 1973.

== Background ==
Tower of Power marked the debut of Lenny Williams being the lead vocalist (though Williams had a solo career prior to joining T.O.P., plus he co-penned the song "You Strike My Main Nerve" from the previous album Bump City). Tower of Power was also the first Tower of Power album to feature future Saturday Night Live band leader Lenny Pickett, who was the youngest member of the band at the time, replacing original lead sax player Skip Mesquite. Also joining the lineup were organist/keyboardist Chester Thompson and guitarist Bruce Conte, who replaced original guitarist Willie James Fulton. Some tracks for the album, such as "What is Hip" were recorded at Wally Heider Studios in San Francisco, California in 1973.

== Release & Reception ==
Professional ratings
Review scores
Source	Rating
AllMusic	4.5/5 stars
Christgau's Record Guide	B

Tower of Power was released in May 1973 by Warner Bros. Records. The album peaked at No. 15 on the Billboard Top LPs chart in 1973 and received a gold record award for sales in excess of 500,000. The album spawned their most successful single, "So Very Hard to Go" which peaked at No. 17 during the week of July 28, 1973, on the Billboard Hot 100. Two other singles from the album also charted on the Billboard Hot 100: "This Time It's Real" and "What Is Hip?".

== Track listing ==
All songs written by Emilio Castillo and Stephen "Doc" Kupka except when noted.

1. "What Is Hip?" (Castillo, Kupka, David Garibaldi) − 5:08
2. "Clever Girl" (Castillo, Kupka, Willie Fulton) − 2:56
3. "This Time It's Real" (David Bartlett, Castillo, Kupka) − 2:54
4. "Will I Ever Find a Love?" − 3:51
5. "Get Yo' Feet Back on the Ground" (Fulton) − 4:52
6. "So Very Hard to Go" − 3:41
7. "Soul Vaccination" − 5:13
8. "Both Sorry Over Nothin'" (Castillo, Kupka, Lenny Williams) − 3:25
9. "Clean Slate" (Castillo, Kupka, Fulton) − 3:22
10. "Just Another Day" (Bruce Conte) − 4:34

== Personnel ==
Tower of Power

- Lenny Williams – lead vocals
- Chester Thompson – organ, backing vocals
- Bruce Conte – guitars, backing vocals
- Francis Rocco Prestia – bass
- David Garibaldi – drums
- Brent Byars – bongos, congas
- Stephen "Doc" Kupka – baritone saxophone, oboe, backing vocals
- Lenny Pickett – clarinet, flute, first tenor saxophone, backing vocals
- Emilio Castillo – second tenor saxophone, backing vocals
- Mic Gillette – trombone, trumpet, flugelhorn, baritone horn, backing vocals
- Greg Adams – trumpet, flugelhorn, string arrangements and conductor, backing vocals

Additional musicians

- Jay Spell – acoustic piano
- Bruce Steinberg – harmonica

Production

- Tower of Power – producers
- Emilio Castillo – supervising producer
- Jim Gaines – recording, mixing
- Alan Chinowsky – mix assistant
- Bruce Steinberg – design, illustration, photography
