= Cold Blood (album) =

Studio album by Cold Blood
- Released: 1969
- Studios: Pacific Recording Studios, San Mateo; Catero Sound Company, San Francisco
- Genres: Psychedelic; funk; blues
- Length: 36:35
- Labels: San Francisco Records, Atlantic
- Producer: David Rubinson

Cold Blood chronology
| Cold Blood (1969) | Sisyphus (1970) |

Professional ratings
Review scores
| Source | Rating |
|---|---|
| AllMusic | 4/5 stars |

Cold Blood is the first studio LP album by Cold Blood, originally released in 1969. It was produced for San Francisco Records and distributed by Atlantic Records. The album reached No. 30 in Canada and No. 23 in the US.

== Track listing ==
Side one
| No. | Title | Writer(s) | Length |
|---|---|---|---|
| 1. | "I Wish I Knew How It Would Feel to Be Free" | Billy Taylor; Dick Dallas | 5:58 |
| 2. | "If You Will" | Raúl Matute | 5:35 |
| 3. | "You Got Me Hummin'" | David Porter; Isaac Hayes | 5:47 |

Side two
| No. | Title | Writer(s) | Length |
|---|---|---|---|
| 1. | "I Just Want to Make Love to You" | Willie Dixon | 5:13 |
| 2. | "I'm a Good Woman" | Barbara Lynn | 3:00 |
| 3. | "Let Me Down Easy" | James MacDougal; Wrecia Holloway | 5:35 |
| 4. | "Watch Your Step" | Bobby Parker | 5:27 |

== Personnel ==
- Lydia Pense – vocals
- Larry Field – guitar
- Rod Ellicott – bass
- Frank J. Davis – drums
- Raúl Matute – piano, organ
- Jerry Jonutz – alto saxophone, baritone saxophone
- Danny Hull – tenor saxophone
- David Padrón – trumpet
- Larry Jonutz – trumpet
- Carl Leach – additional trumpet
- Mic Gillette – additional trumpet, trombone

Technical

- David Rubinson – producer
- Fred Catero - recording
- Rick Griffin – cover
