= Lydia Pense =

American rock-soul-jazz singer (born 1947)

- Born: December 14, 1947 (age 78)
- Origin: San Francisco, California, U.S.
- Genres: Rock, soul, jazz
- Occupation: Singer
- Instrument: Vocals
- Years active: 1969–present
- Labels: Reprise (1972); Warner Bros. Records (1974); ABC (1976); Dig Music (2005)
- Website: http://www.lydiapense.com/

Lydia Jane Pense (born December 14, 1947, in San Francisco, California) is an American rock-soul-jazz singer who, since 1969, has performed with the band Cold Blood. Critics have compared her style to powerful singers including Janis Joplin and Aretha Franklin.

== History ==
Pense's family moved to Redwood City when she was 10. At age 14, while attending Sequoia High School, Pense started singing with a band called the Dimensions, with guitarist Fred Tatman, Larry Hatch, and Kerry Yates. She was a fan of Brenda Lee and was singing her songs, but the band encouraged her to sing R&B in the style of James Brown, Chuck Berry, Fats Domino, and Ray Charles.

Joplin had recommended Pense to the music promoter Bill Graham to audition for the band Cold Blood. Pense joined Cold Blood in 1968, and the band was one of the earliest music groups to be signed by Graham's Fillmore Records.

The band Cold Blood separated in the late 1970s. Pense suspended her music career in the early 1980s to raise her daughter, Danielle before reforming the group in 1988. The band continues to record, tour and perform.

== Discography ==
Their initial four albums, Cold Blood, Sisyphus, First Taste of Sin (produced by Donny Hathaway), and Thriller remain the band's best-known work.

=== Albums ===
Year	Album name	Band	Notes
1969	Cold Blood	Cold Blood	
1971	Sisyphus	Cold Blood	
1972	Lights Out San Francisco (Voco Presents The Soul Of The Bay Area)	Various artists	Performed with the band Tower of Power.
1972	First Taste of Sin	Cold Blood	
1973	Thriller	Cold Blood	
1974	Lydia	Cold Blood	
1975	The Best of Cold Blood	Cold Blood	
1976	Lydia Pense & Cold Blood	Lydia Pense and Cold Blood	The last album before the band's hiatus.
2001	Vintage Blood: Live! 1973		Live album
2005	Transfusion	Lydia Pense and Cold Blood	
2008	Lydia Pense & Cold Blood: Live Blood "Live Album"	Lydia Pense and Cold Blood	
2011	The River City Sessions	Lydia Pense and Cold Blood	
2015	Soul Of The Gypsy	Lydia Pense and Cold Blood	
2023	Cold Blue Heart	Lydia Pense and Cold Blood	
