= Sons of Champlin =

American rock band

The Sons of Champlin
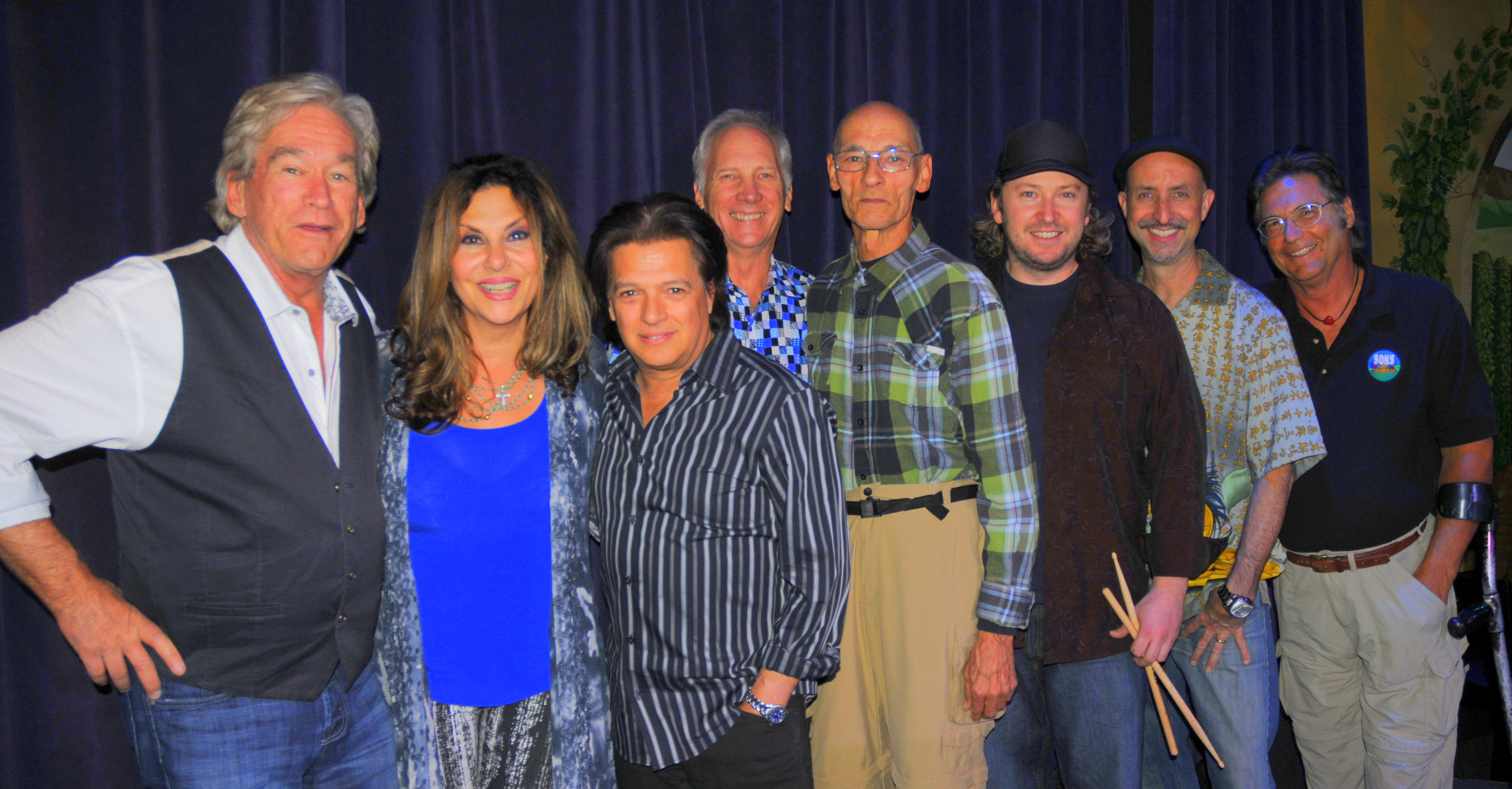
- The Sons of Champlin in 2014. Left to right: Bill Champlin, Tamara Champlin, Carmen Grillo, Richard Mithun, Geoffrey Palmer, Alan Hertz, Jeff Lewis, Tim Cain.

Background information
- Also known as: The Sons, Yogi Phlegm, Little Willie & the Night Worm, The Masterbeats
- Origin: San Francisco, California, United States
- Genres: Jazz rock, blue-eyed soul, R&B, psychedelic rock, funk
- Years active: 1965–1970, 1971–1977, 1980, 1997–present
- Labels: Capitol, Columbia, Ariola, Arista, Goldmine Records, Trident Records, Sons of Champlin, Dig Music, Big Beat
- Members: Bill Champlin; Geoffrey Palmer; Tim Cain; Tamara Champlin; Tal Morris; Jeff Lewis; Bill Gibson; DeWayne Pate; Douglas Rowan
- Past members: Terry Haggerty; John Prosser; Jim Meyers; Al Strong; Bill Bowen; Jim Beem; David Schallock; Bill Vitt; James Preston; Mark Isham; Michael Andreas; Phil Wood; Alan Hertz; Richard Mithun; Steven Frediani; David Farey; Rob Moitoza; Mic Gillette; Tom Saviano; Carmen Grillo
- Website: SonsofChamplin.com

The Sons of Champlin are an American rock band, from Marin County, California, in the San Francisco Bay Area, formed in 1965. They are fronted by vocalist-keyboardist-guitarist Bill Champlin, who, after leaving the group in 1977, joined the rock band Chicago from 1981 to 2009, reforming the Sons of Champlin in 1997. They brought to the late ‘60s music scene in the Bay Area a soulful sound built around a horn section, Hammond B3 organ, sophisticated arrangements, philosophical themes, Bill Champlin's songwriting and blue-eyed soul singing, and Terry Haggerty's unique jazz-based guitar soloing. They are one of the enduring 1960s San Francisco bands, along with Jefferson Airplane, the Grateful Dead and Moby Grape.

== Early years ==
Champlin started his professional musical career while at Tamalpais High School in Mill Valley as a member of a local band, The Opposite Six. In late 1965, when the draft claimed their drummer and bass player, Champlin and the Six’s tenor sax player Tim Cain joined forces with guitarist Terry Haggerty, bassist John Prosser and drummer Jim Myers in the band that became the Sons of Champlin. The name of the group was inspired in part by the film The Sons of Katie Elder, which had just been released the previous summer, and the fact that Champlin was already the father to a son at the time. During its first year of existence the group mostly played dances and parties in Marin County and its repertoire was largely a mix of compositions by both Champlin and Cain--the latter’s tending towards pop music while the former’s taking a decidedly more R&B-approach--and covers of songs by artists like James Brown, Lou Rawls, and The Beatles. Prosser was replaced by Al Strong on bass in summer, 1966 and Myers by drummer Bill Bowen later that year.

The Sons soon attracted the attention of Kingston Trio manager/producer, Frank Werber, who signed them to his label, Trident Records. The group went into the studio in September 1966 to begin work on an album. A single would be taken from these sessions ("Sing Me A Rainbow"/"Fat City") and released in March 1967, receiving airplay in the Bay Area but not cracking the national charts.

As the psychedelic music scene flourished further south in San Francisco, the Sons began regularly playing Bill Graham’s Fillmore Auditorium and Chet Helms’ Avalon Ballroom in the city. At the Fillmore Auditorium the group met Fred Roth, a photographer who at the time was working at the hall flipping burgers. Roth became the group’s manager and introduced them to countercultural poets whom he knew, such as Allen Ginsberg and Gary Snyder, and to the drug LSD. These would become powerful and lasting influences on the band, soon leading them to largely abandon the mainstream pop style they had adopted for Trident and turn towards more lyrically and musically complex psychedelic rock and jazz. In May 1967, Werber got the Sons back into the studio to record the Barry Mann/Cynthia Weil ballad "Shades of Grey” to be the follow-up to their first single. The band, now with a new musical philosophy, began to experiment with the arrangement of the tune in defiance of Werber. Now in an open rebellion against Werber and his vision for them, the Sons were released from their contract with Trident in June 1967 and plans for the new single and yet-to-be-released album were scrapped. (It would finally be released by Big Beat as Fat City in 1999.)

In late 1967, keyboardist/vibraphonist/saxophonist Geoffrey Palmer and trumpeter Jim Beem, two Illinoisans that Cain's brother had met while in the army, arrived in Marin to join the band. With their addition the Sons now had a full-time horn section, though Beem left the group after a mental breakdown in July 1968. Palmer and Haggerty's jazz abilities, Cain's creative horn arrangements, and Champlin's increasingly inventive compositions came together to forge a sound that was distinctive from the rest of the Bay Area rock bands.

During the late 1960s, The Sons of Champlin performed regularly at the San Francisco venues, the Avalon Ballroom, Winterland, the Fillmore West, The Matrix, and various free Speedway Meadows concerts in Golden Gate Park. During this era they shared billing with--among many others--the Grateful Dead, Jefferson Airplane, Santana, Big Brother and the Holding Company, Quicksilver Messenger Service, the Steve Miller Band, Country Joe and the Fish, and The Youngbloods. They were also the opening act at The Band's first concert, along with The Ace of Cups.

== History (1968–1977) ==
In 1968, the Sons of Champlin signed with Capitol Records, releasing first in December a single, "Jesus Is Coming", which was given away for free to anyone who wrote to the band, and then their double-album debut Loosen Up Naturally in April 1969. Their double album soon became an underground hit on FM stations on the West Coast, and cuts such as "Get High" and the 15 minute-long "Freedom" would become the group's signature songs and staples on their setlist. However, unbeknownst to Capitol, the phrase "Big fucking deal" was written in small letters on the psychedelic cover art. It was discovered soon after the album was released and the company was forced to recall 100,000 copies to have the offending word physically scratched out on each jacket.

In July 1969 the group (and Jim Beem, who returned for a short time) went into Capitol Studios to record their second LP, The Sons, released in the fall of that year. This album featured a gentler side of the band, containing several ballads and acoustic tracks, in contrast to the unrelenting driving tempo of their debut. The front cover of the album also bore a statement that the group had shortened their name to "The Sons", reflecting growing resentment in the band over Champlin's dominance. To promote this album The Sons set out on a two-month national tour, culminating with an engagement at the Fillmore East. Despite earning them positive reviews and new fans, the tour proved chaotic and strained relations between the members, particularly between Champlin and the rhythm section of Bowen and Strong. In February 1970, The Sons broke up and Bill Champlin moved to Santa Cruz, where he joined Moby Grape guitarist Jerry Miller in a short-lived project called The Rhythm Dukes. Haggerty and Palmer briefly played together in a loose configuration known as the Nu Boogaloo Express, which featured Big Brother and the Holding Company’s Dave Getz on drums and Mike Finnigan on organ.

Owing Capitol one last LP, The Sons regrouped (sans Cain) in late 1970 as a horn-less five-piece band to begin recording what would become Follow Your Heart. However, The Sons disbanded once more following the album's release in April 1971. When the group reemerged that summer it featured a new rhythm section, with drummer Bill Vitt and bassist David Schallock (from Big Brother and the Holding Company) replacing Bowen and Strong, respectively. For several months, the group went by the name Yogi Phlegm, as which they played one of the last concerts at Bill Graham’s Fillmore West on July 3, 1971. During this period, Wally Haas, an heir to the Levi Strauss fortune, took on the role of manager for the band and financed them while they struggled to make a comeback. In March 1972, James Preston replaced Bill Vitt on drums, and the band once again went by the name Sons of Champlin.

The group was signed by Clive Davis to Columbia Records in March 1973. The day after signing the contract, the band, on tour with the Grateful Dead in New York, got word that bassist David Schallock’s mother, father, and younger brother were murdered in their Mill Valley home by a man with schizophrenia. In shock, the Sons flew back immediately to California and took a short break from touring. During that break, their fourth album, Welcome to the Dance, was recorded and released. A horn section was added again in September 1973, which included Michael Andreas on saxophone, Phil Wood on trumpet and flugelhorn, and Mark Isham (now a film scorer and composer) on trumpet and synthesizer. The Sons were dropped by Columbia in early 1974 and the group went on once more without a label.

The Sons spent 1974 developing a new tight, funk-oriented sound and touring with Three Dog Night and Leon Russell.

In early 1975, the Sons, disgruntled with the record industry, formed their own label, Goldmine Records. It was on this label they recorded and released a self-titled LP, The Sons of Champlin, and a single, "Look Out" in June 1975. Ariola America picked up the band and re-released the record that September. Replacing their horn section in November 1975, the Sons attempted to reinvent their image again, this time dropping from their setlist the old songs and long jams of their psychedelic heyday and focusing on honing a more polished pop and disco sound. To this end the group hired veteran producer Keith Olsen to produce their next album, Circle Filled With Love, at Sound City Studios in January 1976. David Foster, whom Champlin would later work with in his solo career and in Chicago, was brought in by Olsen to write string arrangements. Several tracks from the album were released as singles, with “Hold On” nearly making it into the Top 40, although the band’s much-anticipated breakout still proved elusive. Schallock left the group after the recording and was replaced on bass by Rob Moitoza, Champlin's old bandmate in the Opposite Six. At the end of 1976 the Sons traveled to Caribou Ranch in Colorado to record one final LP for Ariola, Loving is Why, released in March 1977.

As the 1970s wore on, the group's career and creativity stagnated. They found themselves confined to playing the same Bay Area nightclubs for crowds that more were interested in dancing music than indulging the band's penchant for jamming and experimentation. Champlin was also deeply upset at Ariola president Jay Lasker's refusal to let Lee Ritenour's cover of "Isn't She Lovely" (on which Champlin sang lead vocals) be released as a single, despite its hit potential. These frustrations, along with the financial pressures of being in a band that went deeper into debt with every album and tour, led Champlin to decide to leave the group in 1977.

On August 6, 1977, the Sons of Champlin played what was billed as their last performance at the Kirkwood Meadows ski resort opening for Elvin Bishop and Dave Mason. After this show, Champlin left the group to pursue a career as a solo artist and session vocalist in Los Angeles.

Champlin recorded two solo albums, Single (1978) and Runaway (1981), before joining Chicago in 1981.

== Later years ==
After Bill Champlin departed, The Sons did continue briefly under the leadership of Terry Haggerty until 1980, with former Pablo Cruise singer Bud Cockrell in place of Champlin and Pee Wee Ellis on sax.

Champlin reunited with the Sons for eight shows from 1979-80 in the Bay Area and Los Angeles.

On November 25, 1985, the Sons made a surprise appearance at Bill Graham’s 20th anniversary of Fillmore celebration on a bill with Huey Lewis and the News, KBC Band and a reunited Country Joe and the Fish. The reunion comprised Champlin, Terry Haggerty, Geoffrey Palmer, Tim Cain, David Schallock and James Preston with Huey Lewis and the News drummer Bill Gibson sitting in as well as the Freaky Executives Horn Section, who provided the brass.

The 1985 show would be a one-off as Champlin returned to his regular gig with Chicago. But in 1997, the Sons got together again for a series of reunion gigs, then recorded and released their first live CD in 1998. In 2004, The Sons put out another live CD, Secret, following it up with a studio album, Hip L'il Dreams, the following year. Both were produced by Gary Platt, Bill Champlin and Tom Saviano. The group’s back catalog has recently been digitally remastered and re-released in a set of CD compilations by BGO Records.

The Sons of Champlin appeared with original members Champlin, Palmer, Schallock, Preston and Cain. Tal Morris replaced Haggerty in 2001 before Carmen Grillo eventually took over in 2009. Tom Saviano and later Marc Russo of The Doobie Brothers were saxophone players upon the Sons’ regrouping in 1997. Tim Cain returned to the band in 2012. Tower of Power alumnus Mic Gillette handled trumpet, trombone, and tuba parts until his death in January 2016. After James Preston's death in 2014 Alan Hertz joined the band as its drummer with Jeff Lewis on trumpet. Bobby Vega was part of the band on bass upon the departure of Schallock, followed by Richard Mithun. Tamara Champlin was added as a vocalist and Douglas Rowan as the saxophone player. Solo artist, finalist on The Voice, Will Champlin, has guested with the Sons as a player and vocalist.

== Discography ==
=== Studio albums ===
- 1969: Loosen Up Naturally (Capitol Records)
- 1969: The Sons (Capitol Records)
- 1970: Minus Seeds & Stems (self released)
- 1971: Follow Your Heart (Capitol Records)
- 1973: Welcome to the Dance (Columbia Records)
- 1975: The Sons of Champlin (Ariola America)
- 1976: A Circle Filled with Love (Ariola America)
- 1977: Loving Is Why (Ariola America)
- 2005: Hip Li'l Dreams (Dig Music)

=== Live albums ===
- 1998: Live (Arista)
- 2004: Secret (Sons of Champlin)

=== Compilation albums ===
- 1993: The Best of the Sons of Champlin (Capitol Records)
- 1999: Fat City (Big Beat)

=== Singles ===
- 1967: "Sing Me A Rainbow" – No. 124, Billboard Bubbling Under, No. 139, Cashbox Looking Ahead
- 1968: "Jesus Is Coming"
- 1969: "Black and Blue Rainbow"
- 1969: "You Can Fly"
- 1969: "It's Time"
- 1969: "Freedom"
- 1973: "Welcome To The Dance"
- 1975: "Lookout" – No. 103, Billboard Bubbling Under, No. 116, Cashbox Looking Ahead
- 1976: "Imagination's Sake" – No. 107, Billboard Bubbling Under
- 1976: "Hold On" – No. 47, Billboard Hot 100, No. 59, Cashbox Top 100
- 1977: "Here Is Where Your Love Belongs" – No. 80, Billboard Hot 100, No. 71, Cashbox Top 100
- 1977: "Saved By The Grace Of Your Love" – No. 89, Cashbox Top 100
- 1977: "Loving Is Why"
