= Fat City (The Sons of Champlin album) =

Studio album by The Sons of Champlin
- Released: 1967
- Recorded: 1966–1967
- Genre: Rock; psychedelic rock; garage rock
- Length: 53:06
- Label: Trident Productions
- Producer: The Sons of Champlin

The Sons of Champlin chronology
Fat City (1967)	Loosen Up Naturally (1969)

Singles from Fat City
- 1. "Sing Me a Rainbow"

Fat City is the debut album on the Sons of Champlin, formerly known as the Opposite Six. It was released in 1967 by Trident Productions. The Sons of Champlin was a rock band who made many recordings from 1966 to 1967. The record is more concise in structure and effort than their later, looser psychedelic material that they released in the late 1960s.

== Background ==
In 1965, the Sons of Champlin were a garage band. After re-investing earnings from a Kingston trio's success into a properties and music-related corporations in the San Francisco Bay Area, one of which was Trident Productions, Frank Werber signed Sons of Champlin in 1966. Werber sent the band into Trident's own Columbus Recorders with producer Randy Steirling in late 1966 to work on a full album via a lease deal with MGM Verve. Due to a variety of difficulties, it never happened and the Sons unhappily left Trident in June 1967.

The split resulted in only two songs on Fat City that had been previously released, "Sing Me a Rainbow" and "Fat City", which they still perform. The remaining 18 tracks are covers.

== Track listing ==
1. "Sing Me a Rainbow" (3:22)
2. "She Said" (2:39)
3. "Don't Talk to Strangers" (2:33)
4. "1,000 Miles from Nowhere" (2:52)
5. "One of These Days" (2:41)
6. "I Wouldn't Put It Past You" (3:03)
7. "It's Gonna Rain" (2:25)
8. "Fat City" (3:45)
9. "To Me" (3:46)
10. "Green Monday" (2:36)
11. "Don't Stop" (1:58)
12. "Little Fugue" (1:54)
13. "Shades of Grey" (3:47)
14. "Say You Know" (2:44)
15. "I Wish You Could Be Here" (2:50)
16. "One of These Days" (2:10)
17. "It's the End" (2:55)
18. "Pillow" (2:52)
19. "Don't Stop" (1:59)
20. "KCPX Radio Spots" (0:51)
