= Lenny Williams =

American singer-songwriter and musician (born 1945)

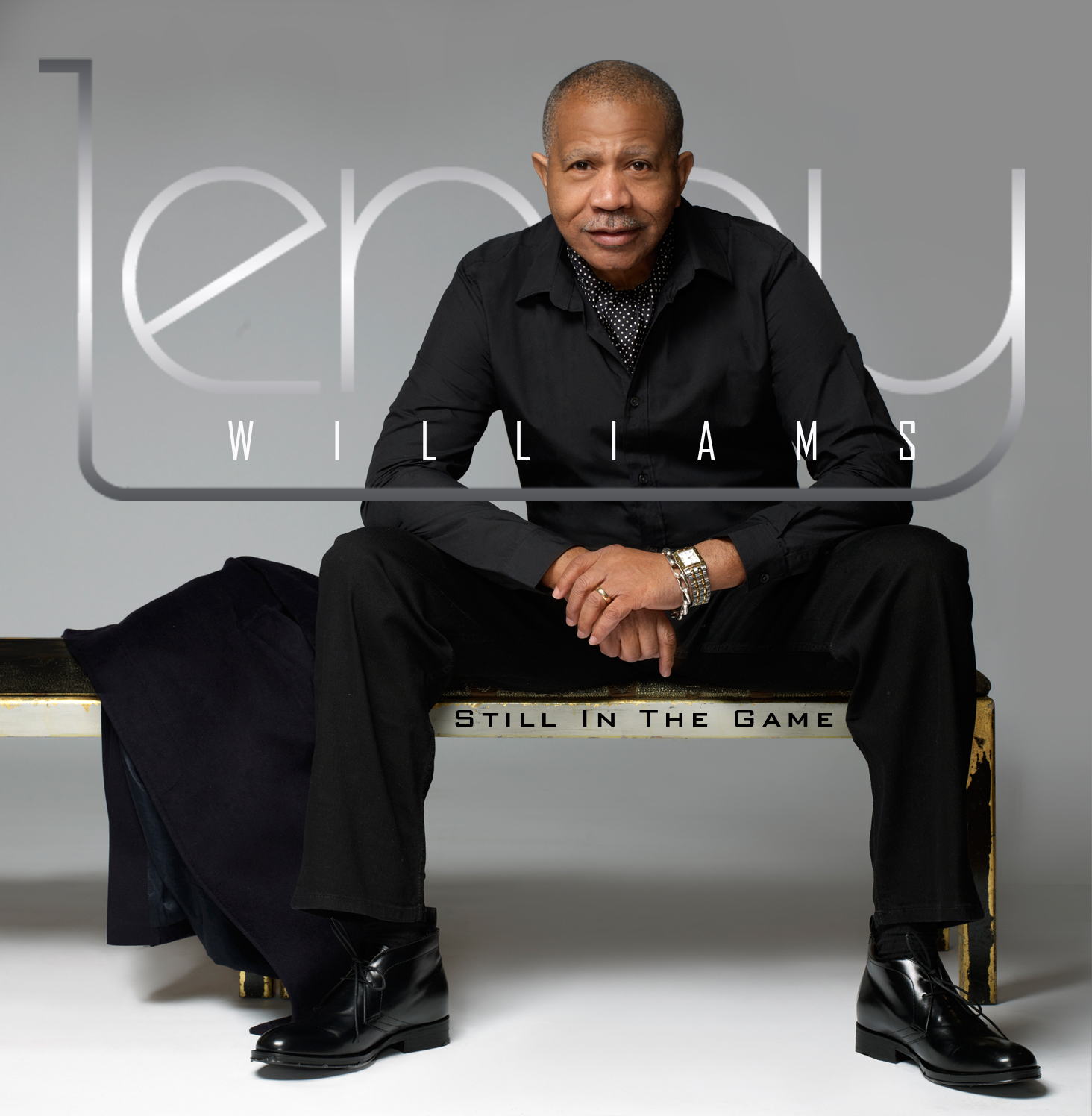
- Album cover for Still in the Game (2012)

Background information
- Born: Leonard Charles Williams; February 16, 1945 (age 81); Little Rock, Arkansas, U.S.
- Genres: Soul; R&B; jazz
- Occupations: Singer; songwriter; musician
- Instruments: Vocals; trumpet
- Years active: 1972–present
- Labels: Fantasy; LenTom; ABC; MCA; Motown; Warner Bros.; Expansion
- Formerly of: Tower of Power
- Website: lennywilliams.com

Leonard Charles Williams (born February 16, 1945) is an American singer-songwriter and musician, best known as the lead vocalist for the soul/funk group Tower of Power in the early 1970s.

As a solo artist, Williams made several hit recordings, including 1975's "Cause I Love You", which originally appeared on his album Rise Sleeping Beauty and 1977's "Choosing You", which reached No. 10 on Billboard's disco chart along with "Shoo Doo Fu Fu Ooh!". "Cause I Love You" was re-recorded for Williams' 1978 album Spark of Love. In 1987. Williams provided the vocal on Kenny G's 1987 hit Don't Make Me Wait for Love, which reached No. 15 on Billboard's Hot 100 chart.

== Early life and career ==
Williams was born in Little Rock, Arkansas, and moved to Oakland, California, at an early age.

== Discography ==
=== Tower of Power ===
- Tower of Power (1973)
- Back to Oakland (1974)
- Urban Renewal (1975)

=== Solo ===
Studio albums

- Pray for the Lion (1974)
- Rise Sleeping Beauty (1975)
- Choosing You (1977)
- Spark of Love (1978)
- Love Current (1979
- Let's Do It Today (1980)
- Taking Chances (1981)
- Changing (1984)
- New Episode (1986)
- Layin' In Wait (1989)
- Chill (1994)
- Here's to the Lady (1996)
- Love Therapy (2000)
- My Way (2004)
- It Must Be Love (2007)
- Unfinished Business (2009)
- Still in the Game (2012)
- Fine (2020)

Compilation albums

- Ooh Child (1993)
- Ultimate Collection (2001)
- Ten Ways of Lovin' You (2002)
- You Won My Heart (2008)
