= Stina Torjesen =

Stina Torjesen is an associate professor at the University of Agder. She is researching the themes emerging markets, sustainability and regional cooperation with particular emphasis on Kazakhstan, India and Afghanistan.

Stina Torjesen was previously research fellow (2005–2007) and later senior research fellow (2007-2010) at the Norwegian Institute of International Affairs (NUPI). She has also served as project manager in the sustainability consultancy SIGLA (2010-2012).

Stina Torjesen holds a BA from the University of Cambridge and an MPhil and DPhil in international relations from the University of Oxford. Her DPhil thesis Understanding Regional Co-operation in Central Asia 1991-2004 assessed the prospects for regional cooperation in Central Asia in the spheres of trade, water and security.

Publications include The Multilateral Dimension in Russian Foreign Policy, (Routledge), co-edited with Elana Wilson Rowe and more recently the journal article Towards a theory of ex-combatant reintegration

Stina Torjesen has contributed to debates on Norwegian foreign policy through public presentations, op-eds and media appearances. She has served as board member at the Oslo Labour Party International Forum (2011-2012) and as Committee member for the group International politics and economics in the Norwegian Polytechnic Society (Polyteknisk Forening) in the years 2010-2013. Stina Torjesen was also an employee representative at the NUPI board (2009-2010).
