= David Garibaldi (musician) =

American drummer (born 1946)

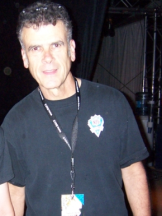
- Garibaldi in 2006

Background information
- Born: November 4, 1946 (age 79); Oakland, California, U.S.
- Genres: R&B, Funk, Soul
- Occupations: Drummer, percussionist, songwriter, educator, author
- Instrument: Drums
- Years active: 1968–present

John David Garibaldi (born November 4, 1946) is an American drummer best known for his work with the Oakland-based band Tower of Power. His playing style is considered a staple of funk music. Garibaldi’s drummer credits also include Natalie Cole, Jermaine Jackson, Boz Scaggs, Deniece Williams and Yellowjackets. Rolling Stone magazine ranked Garibaldi #46 on its list “100 Greatest Drummers of All Time”.

== Early life and education ==
David Garibaldi was born in Oakland, California. His interest in music started at a young age by hearing his mother and her sister singing and playing piano. He took piano and violin lessons before switching to percussion by age 10.

Garibaldi played a drum kit for the first time at age 15, after hearing an older student play rock n’ roll beats. He was able to reproduce the beat by ear and continued teaching himself how to play the drums by listening to records. He later joined the high school’s big band and practiced with the help of Eddie Tinga, a drummer and employee of the US Postal Service who also served in the Air Force reserve. After being drawn into service, Tinga gave Garibaldi his drum kit so he could practice at home. At age 17, Garibaldi’s parents bought him his first drum kit, which he would later use to record Tower of Power’s debut album “East Bay Grease”. He graduated high school in 1964.

During his time at Chabot Junior College, he attended a James Brown concert at the San Jose Civic Auditorium. During the rehearsals, Garibaldi was impressed by the musicians’ precision and rhythmic patterns. Soon after, Garibaldi formed his first band called The Disciples. He played with them until 1966, when he was drawn into service.

Garibaldi received basic training at Lackland Air Force Base in San Antonio, Texas, where he also auditioned for the 724th Air Force Band. During his service at McChord Air Force Base in Tacoma, Washington, Garibaldi performed with different ensembles, including a symphonic orchestra where he played timpani, concert snare drum and mallet percussion. He also played the drums and played with friends and acquaintances in Tacoma.

After being honorably discharged in December 1969, Garibaldi enrolled again at Chabot Junior College to finish his studies.

== Career ==
Upon returning to the Bay Area, Garibaldi began performing as a freelancer in various groups. These performances led him to join Tower of Power in July 1970.

In the mid-70’s Garibaldi left Tower of Power and commenced performing, recording and writing with artists including Gino Vannelli, Wishful Thinking, Patti Austin, Natalie Cole, Boz Scaggs, the Yellowjackets, Jermaine Jackson and Deniece Williams. Garibaldi rejoined Tower of Power in 1998. Later in the mid 2000's Garibaldi released a collection of drum loops titled "Tower of Funk" produced with Josquin Des Pres. Garibaldi announced his retirement from Tower of Power on January 15, 2024.

Garibaldi is the author of notable instructional music books and educational DVDs including Future Sounds and The Funky Beat. He has written a feature column for Modern Drummer Magazine.

== Style ==
In an interview with the Percussive Arts Society, Garibaldi explains that at 23 years of age, he was not trying to create revolutionary drum grooves but rather follow his creative instinct.

All I did was take what I liked from about six or seven of my favorite drummers and then made one drummer out of all of that. My goal was (…) to have my own sound and personality like they did.

— David Garibaldi

Mark Griffith of the Percussive Arts Society describes Garibaldi’s style as a funky sixteenth-note based groove that has all or most of the notes played separately with backbeats that occasionally turn around give the illusion that the pulse is in a different place than expected.

In 1978, Garibaldi expanded his drum kit with combinations 8”, 10”, 12”, 14” and 16” toms. His configuration included a second hi-hat on his right side. He argued that the conventional way of playing the hi-hat with the right hand over the left was limiting. Additionally, having a 14” to the left and a 12” hi-hat to the right gave him two different pitches. In 1982, he settled for a five-piece drum kit with 10”, 12” and 14” toms.

Garibaldi is often described as a drummer with a distinctive style:

I’m absolutely certain David influenced drummers all over (…). Everybody heard about this guy playing this unique style that was very exciting and explosive”.

— Bernard Purdie

He always has to be unique and that doesn’t fit in with other people who all they want is just a timekeeper. That’s not what he is. He’s a unique drummer.

— Emilio Castillo

In an interview with the drum podcast website The Drum Click, he cited Sonny Payne (Count Basie), Greg Errico (Sly and the Family Stone), Benard Purdie (Aretha Franklin, Steely Dan), Joseph "Zigaboo" Modeliste (The Meters), and Clyde Stubblefield (James Brown) as his main drumming influences, and Melvin Parker (Maceo Parker), Jamal Thomas (Maceo Parker), Orestes Vilato (Ray Baretto), Tony Williams (Miles Davis), and Elvin Jones (John Coltrane) as additional influences on his drumming.

== Songwriting with Tower of Power ==
Garibaldi also performed the role of songwriter during his time with Tower of Power. He co-wrote songs including "What Is Hip?", "After Hours", "Down to the Night Club", "East Bay", "Oakland Stroke", "Vuela Por Noche" and "You Wanna Be a Hero". The workflow varied, depending on which member of the band brought the original idea to the band. Often, the rhythm section was developed first, followed by the horns.

Emilio Castillo (saxophone) and Garibaldi usually worked on the rhythm section while Rocco Prestia (bass) listened to the overall feel of the song. The horn section later added melodies and hooks. Garibaldi incorporated the new elements of the arrangement into his drum pattern. He avoided the standard accentuation of the second and fourth beat with the snare drum. His goal was to achieve a more repetitive pattern that resets itself after a few bars. According to the band, this composing and arranging process lasted for hours or days.

=== What Is Hip? ===
Garibaldi co-wrote Tower of Power’s hit song “What Is Hip?” that reached #39 on the Billboard Hot R&B/Hip-Hop Songs chart and #91 on the Billboard Hot 100 chart. During one rehearsal with Tower of Power, he added syncopation to a drum pattern he played often and suggested the sixteenth-note bass line. Kupka and Castillo added the horn arrangement. The song went on to become one of the band’s biggest hits.

In 1999, Tower of Power released a two-disc anthology called “What Is Hip?” which included 35 tracks of their 30-year career. David Lynch from the Austin Chronicle describes the name as “not only (a) reference of their signature tunes” but also as the question “is Tower of Power still hip?” The anthology received positive reviews as a documentation of the group’s evolving sound throughout the 1970s and 1980s.

Jazz bassist Marcus Miller included a cover of the song “What Is Hip?” in his 2007 album Free.

== Accolades ==
Garibaldi won the R&B/Funk category of the Modern Drummer Magazine Readers poll six times in a row from 1980 to 1985. He won the same award an additional three times in 2003, 2007 and 2009. In 1998, “David Garibaldi featuring Talking Drums” won the award for Best Percussion Video awarded by DRUM! Magazine.

In 2008, Garibaldi was presented the Guitar Center Legends Award. He was also inducted into the Percussive Arts Society Hall of Fame in 2012.
