= Mic Gillette =

American musician (1951–2016)

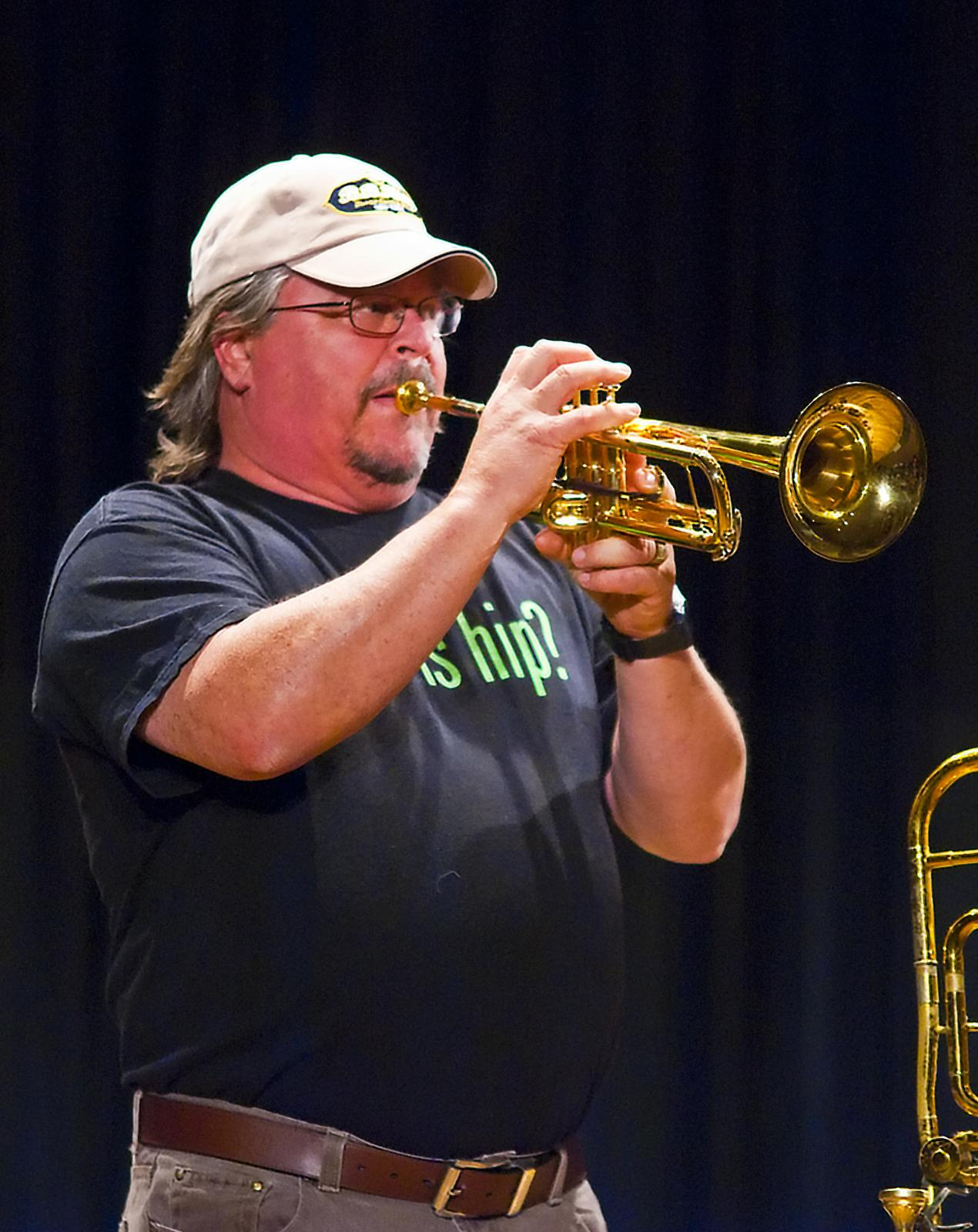
- Gillette in 2010

Background information
- Born: May 7, 1951; Oakland, California, U.S.
- Died: January 17, 2016 (aged 64) Concord, California, U.S.
- Genres: Funk; soul; East Bay Grease
- Occupation: Musician
- Instruments: Trumpet; trombone; flugelhorn
- Website: micgillette.com

Mic Gillette (May 7, 1951 – January 17, 2016) was an American brass player, born and raised in the San Francisco Bay Area's East Bay. He is best known for being a member of the bands; Tower of Power, Cold Blood, and The Sons of Champlin. He played in the horn section with Tower of Power for 19 years.

== Early life ==
His father Ray Gillette was a trombonist, playing with acts such as Harry James, Tommy Dorsey, Stan Kenton, and other big bands. A child prodigy, Gillette picked up the trumpet and was reading music by age four.

== Career ==
At age 15, he joined the band that would later be known as Tower of Power, playing various brass instruments for the band including the trumpet, trombone, baritone horn and tuba.

He took a brief break from Tower of Power to tour in the 1970s and record with the band Cold Blood.

He re-joined Tower of Power a year later, touring and opening for Santana and Creedence Clearwater Revival. As its reputation as a premier horn band grew, Tower of Power toured with Heart, Rod Stewart, and The Rolling Stones, among others. In addition, Gillette appeared on hundreds of recordings as a session player.

In 1984, Gillette quit touring to be a full-time father to his daughter Megan. In 1998 he returned to music. Shortly after joining the Sons of Champlin that year, he missed one of their concerts due to a split lip. According to Gillette himself, he had split his lip due to not playing for 14 years after leaving Tower of Power. He spent those years running a landscaping business in the San Francisco Bay Area.

Gillette was a member of the Sons of Champlin (he departed in 2006), fronted by Chicago vocalist and keyboardist Bill Champlin; he had also a member of Tortilla Soup, a 10 piece northern California band. He played with comedian Danny Marona, the Stevie "Keys" Roseman All Star Band, the Strokeland Superband, and Funky Loophole (Gillette's own band). He toured and recorded with The Doobie Brothers (appearing on the Doobie's "Live At Wolf Trap" DVD), Blood, Sweat & Tears, and Santana. After a 25-year absence, Gillette rejoined Tower of Power in August 2009 for touring, replacing Mike Bogart; but he left the band again after just more than a year and a half on February 14, 2011.

== Personal life ==
In the last years of his life, Gillette continued to do session work as well as live appearances; fulfilling a long-time dream to assemble his own band, he brought together Megan Gillette McCarthy (his daughter), Greg Barker, Dave Hawkes, Clint Day, and Matt Martinez to create the Mic Gillette Band (the MGB). The final version of MGB included Megan Gillette, vocals, Andres Soto, Tenor Sax, Jason Stewart, Guitar, Mark Foglia, Drums, Ryan Habegger, Trumpet and Keys, and Clinton Day on Bass and vocals.

Gillette spent much of his time teaching doing clinics at middle schools & high schools. He taught clinics at Northgate High School in Walnut Creek, California and at Stanley Middle School in Lafayette, California. He raised hundreds of thousands of dollars for music departments in schools across the United States.

== Death ==
Gillette died on January 17, 2016, of a heart attack, aged 64 in Gold Beach, Oregon. He was survived by his wife Julia and his daughter Megan Gillette.

== Discography ==
=== Band Albums ===
He was featured on "Hip Li'l Dreams", a disc of originals released by the Sons of Champlin in 2005 and appeared on the Doobie Brother's Live at Wolf Trap DVD. Gillette worked on various side projects. After a chance meeting with Tony Adamo, Gillette wrote the horn arrangements for Adamo's albums, Straight Up Deal and Dance of Love. His arrangements can be heard on Adamo tunes "No Strings", "Up in It" and "Groove Therapy". Gillette also performed with vocalist Josh Pfeiffer in Northern California with an eight-piece group featuring guitarist Dave Schramm and keyboard player Kent Gripenstraw.

He is included on the Cold Blood album, Sisyphus (1970) playing trombone, trumpet and flugelhorn.

=== Solo albums ===
- Mic Gillette, Newvo Kids (1995), Dancing Walrus Music
- Mic Gillette, Ear Candy (2005), BKA Records
1. "Funky Good Time" [Intro] (1:05)
2. "Tell Mama" (3:47)
3. "I Like That" (3:51)
4. "Before I Go" (4:55)
5. "How Was I To Know" (3:57)
6. "If Only for A Moment" (4:22)
7. "Abaco" (4:12)
8. "I Don't Want Nobody to Give Me Nothing (Open Up the Door, I'll Get It Myself)" (4:21)
9. "If" (6:42)
10. "It Had Better Be Tonight" (3:50)
11. "Funky Good Time" [Complete] (4:13)

=== As sideman ===
With John Lee Hooker

- Free Beer and Chicken (ABC, 1974)
