= Marcela Delpastre =

Marcela Delpastre (French pronunciation: [maʁsɛl dɛlpastʁə]; Occitan: Marcèla Delpastre Occitan pronunciation: [maɾˈsɛlɔ dɛlˈpatɾe / maɾˈsɛlɔ dɛlˈpastɾe]), also known as Marcelle Delpastre, was an Occitan- and French-language author from Limousin. She was born on September 2, 1925, and died on February 6, 1998.

== Biography ==
=== Early years ===
Marcela Delpastre was born on September 2, 1925, in Germont, near the commune of Chamberet in the département of Corrèze. The daughter, granddaughter and great-granddaughter of local farmers, she grew up in the heart of Limousin’s countryside civilization. At home, she would hear and learn two languages: Occitan and French. She went to primary school in Surdoux and Saint-Léonard in Haute-Vienne and then to secondary school in Brive where she took a baccalauréat in philosophy and literature. She later entered the college of decorative arts of Limoges where she developed a strong liking for human shapes (faces and feminine curves) and beauty in general.

In 1945, she returned to the family farm in Germont where she spent the rest of her life working the land, something she did "because one has to earn their daily bread". In the meantime, whether milking the cows or driving a tractor, she’d still think of apt rhymes for the poems she wrote. Poetry accompanied her all day long and she’d always carry a wee jotter and a pen in her pocket. When inspiration came, when the words were there, fine and ready, Marcela took a break and immediately put them down on paper. Indeed, most of her masterpieces probably sprang from a bundle of straw in a stable or in the middle of a field.

From the end of the 1940s to the early years of the following decade, as the exercise books in which she wrote her poems and thoughts were beginning to heap up, Marcela Delpastre sent some of her works to literary journals and arts reviews. She was greatly encouraged by the correspondence she engaged in. As her texts got published, Marcela grew increasingly famous among the well-read people of Limousin.

=== Local literary recognition ===
Marcela Delpastre’s first work in lenga d’òc was called La Lenga que tant me platz (The Language I Love So):

"E si m’aproisme a la senta taula, voldriá 'na òstia de pan de blat — per comuniar tot per lo còp emb lo bon Dieu e emb la terra — ensemble belament 'semblats, coma l’alen a la saba daus blats, — dins la lenga que tant me platz."
"And should I get near the holy table, I’d ask for a host of wheat bread — to receive communion both from Our Lord and the earth — the two of them so beautifully alike, as the wind is the sap of corn, — in the language I love so."

From then on, Marcela decided to write in Limousin and about Limousin. In the aforementioned magazine were subsequently published a couple of poems, among which Lo Rossinhòl e l’eglantina (The Nightingale & the Wild Rose) and Lo Chamin de tèrra (The Dirt Track). For an easier writing, she also learned the normalized Occitan spelling.

In the mid-1960s, Marcela began collecting and re-inventing traditional tales from her native Limousin. The first book was published in 1970 and its title was: Los Contes dau Pueg Gerjant (The Tales of Mount Gerjant). At the same time, she did the work of an ethnologist and wrote, in French, Le Tombeau des ancêtres (The Tomb of Our Ancestors) about the customs and beliefs surrounding local religious festivals and cults. In 1968, La Vinha dins l’òrt (The Vine in the Garden) was released: this poem won an award at the Jaufre Rudel competition. Its French version, La Vigne dans le jardin was adapted for the stage by the Radio-Limoges drama company. They adapted more texts by Marcela Delpastre later in the decade, among which featured L’Homme éclaté (The Exploded Man) and La Marche à l’étoile (Walking to the Star). Marcela kept on writing and published other poems in several reviews, such as Lemouzi, Traces, Poésie 1, Vent Terral and Òc.

=== Occitania-wide acclaim ===
In 1974, Saumes pagans (Pagan Psalms) appeared in the collection called Messatges de l’IEO. It’s with these poems that Marcela Delpastre truly gained recognition from the whole Occitan literary world. In Le Bourgeois et le paysan (The Bourgeois & the Farmer) she went another step farther in portraying the customs, beliefs and oral tradition of Limousin, this time around the theme of fire. Later, in her Bestiari lemosin (The Limousin Bestiary), she focused on wild animals and cattle and mixed reality with mythology. By the end of the 1970s Marcela also met two very important men for her career: one is Micheu Chapduelh and the other is Jan dau Melhau. She regularly featured in their review, Lo Leberaubre, and grew popular beyond the circle of her readers by giving her opinion in articles and interviews in the local Limousin press (Limousin Magazine, La Montagne, L’Écho, Le Populaire...), but most of all, among Occitan activists thanks to magazines like Òc, Occitans and especially Connaissance des Pays d’Òc, with Ives Roqueta’s help.

Suffering from Charcot disease, she died in her bed on February 6, 1998, in her Germont farm, where she was born, where she’d always stayed and worked. Jan dau Melhau, her sole legatee, has since released more of her writings for the Lo Chamin de Sent-Jaume publishing house. The poet’s works are kept at Limoges’s City Library.

A poet, a story-teller, an author and an ethnologist, Marcela Delpastre is recognised as a major figure in 20th-century Occitan literature, alongside contemporaries such as Joan Bodon, Bernat Manciet, Renat Nelli and Max Roqueta.

== Extracts ==
Res que me manque, res.
Lo temps de naisser, de morir, lo temps de me virar. Lo temps de res.
D’esser quela chalor. Queu sang. Quela bufada.
Lo temps d’esser ieu-mesme — Res.
'Na polsada de l’esser.
♦ L'Òrt jos la luna

Onte se'n van, quilhs que se'n van?
Lo paubre auseu, lo chen, la femna —
E tu qui parlas tant, onte aniràs?
Mas se'n van pas!
Demoran qui, que bujan pas, remuedan pas, ni pè ni sòla.
E lo temps que se'n vai —
Lo temps qu'a pas besonh de ilhs —
Lo temps qu'espera pas —
Lo temps se'n vai d’aicí a deman mai tòrna pas virar.
E tu parier lai entraràs, per la broa tranquilla dau chamin.
E tu segur lai entraràs, dins lo silenci priond de l'eternela eternitat.
♦ La Broa dau chamin

Me desvelhe.
Es be jorn.
Coma un qui se desvelha
E qui la nuech n’a pas barrat sos uelhs,
Ai be trauchat l’ivern sens veire nuech ni nèvia
E sens sentir lo vent.
Me desvelhe.
Veiquí.
De flors mai de fuelhas se’s perfumada l’auba,
E la prima chanta lo vent.
M’a fach durmir ni nuech ni nèvia,
E lo mes mòrt me ten lo sang:
Que me son las fuelhas mai las flors!
E lo vent de prima ni lo solelh de l’auba.
Las peiras daus chamins que lo giau las trabalha,
E la terra daus puegs,
Sentan dins las priondors lo levam de la grana
E las dents de las raiç.
Mas ieu, que me desvelha?
E sabe-ieu qu’es jorn!
E sabe-ieu si l’auba raia, e que me vòl l’amor!
♦ La Prima

There is nothing I lack, nothing.
The time to be born, to die, the time to turn around. The time for nothing.
To be that heat. That blood. That breathing.
The time to be myself — Nothing.
The breath of being.
♦ The Garden Under the Moon

Where do they go, those who leave?
The poor bird, the dog, the woman —
And you who speaks so much, where will you go?
They're not leaving at all!
They remain here, not moving, not stirring, neither foot nor sole.
And the time that elapses —
The time that doesn't need them —
The time that doesn't wait —
The time that leaves from here to the morrow and then never comes back.
And you too will walk in there, along the quiet path.
And you sure will walk in there, in the deep silence of eternal eternity.
♦ Along the Path

I'm waking up.
It's well into the day.
Like one who's waking up
And whose eyes the night hasn't shut,
I've been living through the winter without seeing night nor snow,
Without feeling the wind.
I'm waking up.
That's it.
With flowers and leaves the morning has perfumed itself,
And springtime sings of the wind.
Neither night nor snow have made me sleep,
And the dead month is freezing my blood:
What are flowers and leaves to me!
Or the springtime wind or even the morning sun.
The pebbles on the path that frost is working on,
And the earth of the hills,
Feel deep inside the leaven of the seed
And the teeth of the roots.
But me, what is waking me?
Do I even know it's day yet!
Do I even know if the morning's shining, and what loves wants from me!
♦ The Springtime

== Selected bibliography ==
- 1964 : La lenga que tant me platz (Lemouzi, Tulle)
- 1965 : Lo Rossinhòu e l’Eglantina (Lemouzi)
- 1967 : La Vinha dins l’òrt (Escòla Jaufre Rudel)
- 1968 : Lo Chamin de terra (Lemouzi)
- 1970 : Los Contes dau pueg Gerjant (Lemouzi)
- 1974 : Saumes pagans (IEO-Novelum)
- 1982 : Sorcellerie et magie en Limousin (Lemouzi)
- 1985 : Louanges pour la femme (Friches, Saint-Yrieix-la-Perche)
- 1987 : Nathanaël sous le figuier / Nathanaël jos le figier (Lo Chamin de Sent Jaume, Meuzac)
- 1998 : Le paysan, l'arbre et la vigne (Lo Chamin de Sent Jaume, Meuzac)
- 1989 : Le passage / La trauchada (Lemouzi)
- 1990 : L'histoire dérisoire (Fédérop, Gardonne)
- 1996 : Las Vias priondas de la memòria (L’Ostal del Libre, Aurillac)
- 1997 : Paraulas per questa terra (Lo Chamin de Sent Jaume, Meuzac)
- 1997 : Cinq heures du soir & Proses pour l’après-midi, (Payot, Paris)
- 1998 : Le jeu de patience (Payot, Paris)
- 1998 : Les chemins creux (Presses de la Cité)
- 1998 : Le jardin sous la lune / L'òrt jos lo figier (Lo Chamin de Sent Jaume, Meuzac)
- 1999 : Saumes pagans (Lo Chamin de Sent Jaume, Meuzac)
- 1999 : Poèmes dramatiques (Lo Chamin de Sent Jaume, Meuzac)
- 2000 : Le Bourgeois et le paysan, les contes du feu (Payot, Paris)
- 2000 : Poésie modale (Lo Chamin de Sent Jaume, Meuzac)
- 2001 : Le Testament de l’eau douce (Fédérop, Gardonne)
- 2001 : Les Petits recueils (Lo Chamin de Sent Jaume, Meuzac)
- 2001 : D’una lenga l’autra (Lo Chamin de Sent Jaume, Meuzac)
- 2001 : Ballades (Lo Chamin de Sent Jaume, Meuzac)
- 2002 : Le Chasseur d’ombres: et autres psaumes (Lo Chamin de Sent Jaume, Meuzac)
- 2002 : L’Araignée et la rose: et autres psaumes (Lo Chamin de Sent Jaume, Meuzac)
- 2003 : Bestiari lemosin (Lo Chamin de Sent Jaume, Meuzac)
- 2004 : Mémoires (Lo Chamin de Sent Jaume, Meuzac)
- 2005 : Des trois passages en Limousin (Lo Chamin de Sent Jaume, Meuzac)
