= Joan Bodon =

French writer

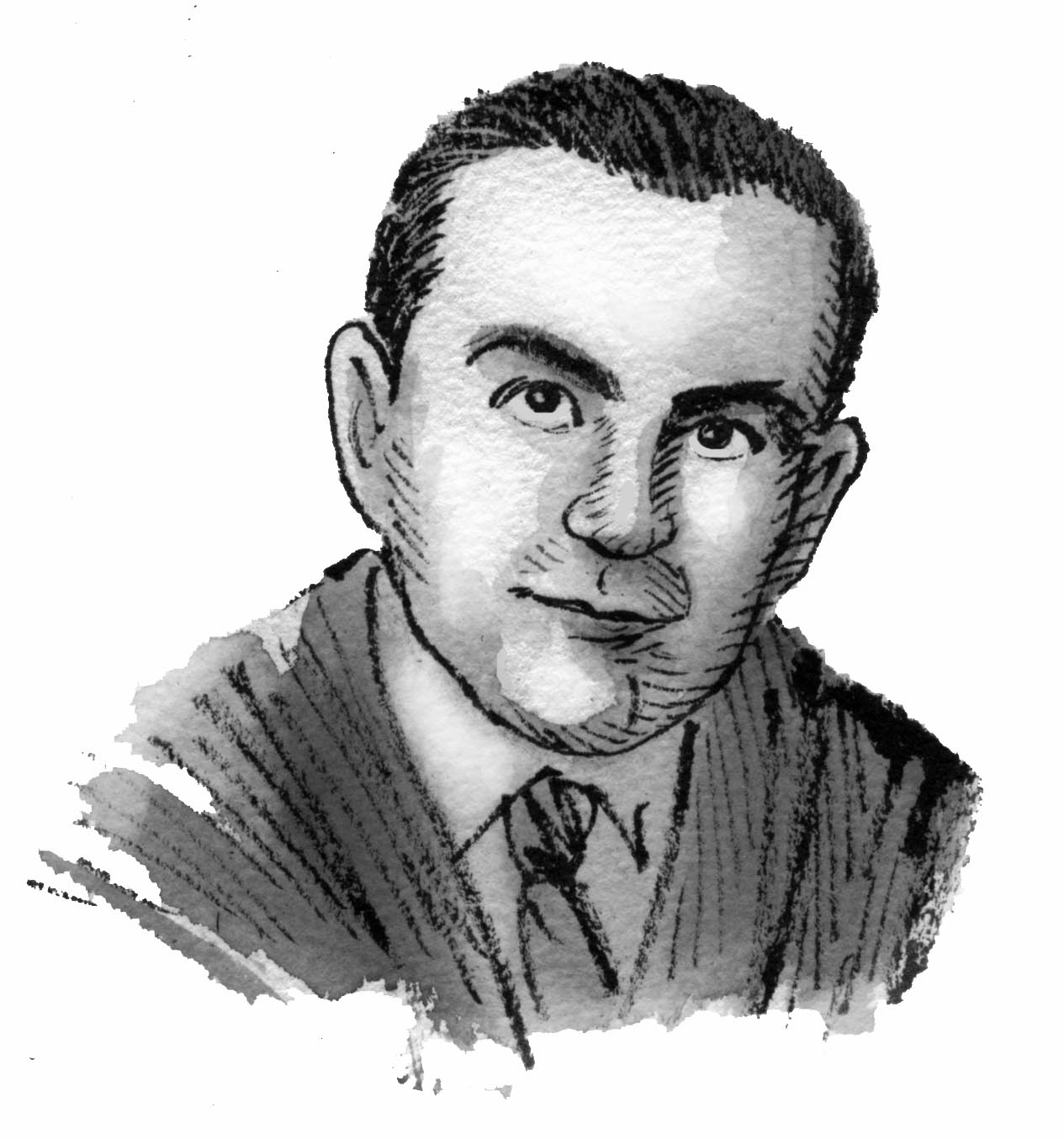
Joan Bodon

Joan Bodon (Occitan pronunciation: [dʒuˈam buˈðu]; French: Jean Boudou; December 11, 1920 in Crespin – February 24, 1975 in Algeria) was an author who wrote exclusively in Occitan, although he is credited as Jean Boudou in the French translations of his works. His mother was a contaira, or storyteller, from Rouergue (and distant relative of Honoré de Balzac) and paved the way for his love and frequent use of traditional Occitan language folktales and figures. Together with Renat Nelli, Marcela Delpastre, Robèrt Lafont, and Max Roqueta, Bodon ranks among the most prominent Occitan writers of the twentieth century.

== Biography ==
Upon completing his primary school teaching in his native Crespin, Joan Bodon was admitted to cours complémentaire in Naucelle in 1932. He began stammering after hearing news of his beloved grandmother's death in 1934 and never recovered from it. At 17, he entered the école normale of Rodez in order to be trained as a future teacher. He graduated while working part-time in Rodez, Pau and Saint-André de Najac's technical schools, and started his career in Castanet in 1941 as a primary school teacher. He was then sent to Durenque. From 1943 until the Red Army liberated his camp at the end of World War II, he did forced labour in Breslau, Silesia. Back in Durenque, Joan was married to Camille Vidal before moving again to Mauron de Maleville (1949–1955) and returning close to home in Saint-Laurent-d'Olt (1955–1967), still as a teacher. He died in Algiers, eight years after being promoted to the then-French colony's capital.

== Works ==
Written entirely in Occitan, his mother tongue, and despite the usual contempt of the Parisian élite for minority languages, his works include a number of novels, stories and poems inspired by the universality of life. According to Georg Kremnitz, "there is a huge gap between the raw material gathered by Bodon and what he made of it with his writing... Anyway, we know the value of his art, both its literary value and its human value: Bodon ranks among the greatest authors of modern times. Had he written in a majority language, his voice would now be heard everywhere. It is our duty to make sure this voice resounds as far as possible because, unlike so many other invasive voices, his is not closed but open to a more human world..."

== Selected works ==
- Poems (1935–1941)
- When I Was Young (Souvenirs des Chantiers de la jeunesse, 1942, unreleased)
- The Freshness of River Viaur (poems, 1945, unreleased)
- L'Evangèli de Bertomieu (Bartholomy's Gospel) (1949)
- The Song from Home (poems, 1949, unreleased)
- Los Contes del meu ostal (Stories From Home) (1951)
- Stories from River Viaur (1952, unreleased)
- Contes dels Balssas (Stories from the Balzacs) (1953)
- The Toulouse Cross (unfinished novel, 1954, unreleased)
- La Grava sul camin (The Pebbles on the Path) (novel, 1956, Éditions du Rouergue, 1988)
- La Santa Estela del centenari (novel, 1960)
- The Book for My Friend (poems, 1960, unreleased)
- L'Òme que èri ieu (The Man I Was) (unfinished novel, 1960)
- Lo Libre dels grands jorns (The Book Of Great Days) (novel, 1964)
- The October Fair (unfinished novel, 1965, unreleased)
- Lo libre de Catòia (Catòia's Book) (novel, 1966)
- The Act (unfinished novel, 1967–1968, unreleased)
- The New Co-operative (unfinished novel, 1967–1968, unreleased)
- Farming Progress in Aveyron (unfinished, 1967–68, unreleased)
- Nothing Like an Electro-schock (poems, 1970)
- An Occitan's Speech (newspaper chronicle, 1972–1975)
- La Quimèra (The Chimaera) (novel, 1974)
- Stories of the Drac (1975)
- The Golden Ring (illustrated tale, 1975)
- Sus la mar de las galèras (Sailing to the Galleys) (poems, 1975)
- Las Domaisèlas (The Young Ladies) (fantasy story, 1976)
- Letters of Joan Bodon to Enric Molin (posthumous edition, 1986)

== Legacy ==
In 2016, Bodon was included in an exhibition of Occitan literature as an essential author. Bodon's home in Segala has been maintained as a museum, L'Ostal Joan-Bodon, which opened in 2022.
