= Niçard dialect =

Occitan dialect spoken in Nice, France

Niçard
- niçard/nissart/niçart
- Pronunciation: [niˈsaʀt]
- Native to: France, Monaco
- Region: County of Nice, Monaco
- Language family: Indo-European: Italic; Latino-Faliscan; Latin; Romance; Italo-Western; Western Romance; Gallo-Iberian; Gallo-Romance (Note: Some Iberian scholars may alternatively classify Occitan as Iberian Romance.); Occitano-Romance; Occitan; Provençal; Niçard
- Writing system: Latin

Official status
- Regulated by: Conselh de la Lenga Occitana (classic orthography) / Félibrige (Mistralian orthography)

Language codes
- ISO 639-3: –
- Glottolog: nica1249
- Linguasphere: 51-AAA-gd
- IETF: oc-nicard
- Niçard in today's Alpes-Maritimes department, according to Dalbera

Niçard (Classical orthography), nissart/Niçart (Mistralian orthography, IPA: [niˈsaʀt]), niçois (/niːˈswɑː/ nee-SWAH, French: [niswa]), or nizzardo (Italian: [nitˈtsardo]) is the dialect that was historically spoken in the city of Nice, in France, and in a few surrounding communes. Niçard is generally considered a subdialect of Provençal, itself a dialect of Occitan. Some Italian irredentists have claimed it as a Ligurian dialect.

Most residents of Nice and its region no longer speak Niçard, and the very few who do are fully bilingual in French as Niçard has lost its function of a vernacular language decades ago. Nonetheless, today there is a developing revival of the use of the language. Some local television news is presented in Niçard (with French subtitles) and street signs in the old town of Nice are written in the dialect as well as in French. The Niçard song Nissa La Bella is often regarded as the "anthem" of Nice.

== Writing system ==
Niçard is written using two forms:

- Classical orthography. Preferring the native traditions of the language, this form was developed by Robert Lafont (Phonétique et graphie du provençal, 1951; L'ortografia occitana, lo provençau, 1972) and Jean-Pierre Baquié (Empari lo niçard, 1984). It is regulated by the Conselh de la Lenga Occitana.
- Mistralian orthography. Closer to written French, it was invented by the Félibrige (although there also exists an Acadèmia Nissarda).

An Italian orthography was abandoned when Nice joined the French Empire in 1861. It was briefly reinstated in 1942 and 1943 when Italy occupied and administered the city.

Orthography Comparison (from the Universal Declaration of Human Rights)
| English | Classical | Mistralian |
|---|---|---|
| All human beings are born free and equal in dignity and rights. They are endowed with reason and conscience and should act towards one another in a spirit of brotherhood. | Toti li persona naisson liuri e egali en dignitat e en drech. Son dotadi de rason e de consciéncia e li cau agir entre eli emb un esperit de frairesa. | Touti li persouna naisson lib(e)ri e egali en dignità e en drech. Soun doutadi de rasoun e de counsciència e li cau agì entre eli em' un esperit de frairesa. |

== Classification ==
The classifications of Occitan in dialects hesitate between defining Niçard as a specific dialect or including it in Maritime Provençal. Niçard shares some phonetical archaisms with Occitan areas as distant as Aranese, which is also using proparoxytone words. It also shares with Aranese quite a heavy influence of a neighbouring language (Catalan for Aranese, Italian for Niçard). Regional differences are broadly accepted by linguists and French national education authorities in Occitan. Domergue Sumien defined in his PhD thesis Occitan as a pluricentric language, and included Niçard among the seven regional standards to be taught. The French Ministry of National Education uses either “nissart-langue d’oc” or “occitan-langue d’oc nissart”.

== See also ==
- Occitan language
- Félibrige
- Nissa La Bella
- Italian irredentism in Nice

== Sources ==
- Andrews James Bruyn (1875) Essai de grammaire du dialecte mentonnais avec quelques contes, chansons et musique du pays, Nice: no name [re-ed. 1978, 1981, Menton: Société d’Art et d’Histoire du Mentonnais]
- Andrews James Bruyn (1877) Vocabulaire français-mentonnais, Nice: no name [re-ed. 1977, Marseilles: Lafitte Reprints]
- Baquié Joan-Pèire (1987) (collab. Andrieu SAISSI) Empari lo niçard / Apreni lo provençau, Nice: CRDP Nice / CDDP Alpes Maritimes
- Barberis Francesco. Nizza italiana: raccolta di varie poesie italiane e nizzarde, corredate di note. Editore Tip. Sborgi e Guarnieri (Nizza, 1871). University of California, 2007
- Bec Pierre (1970–71) (collab. Octave NANDRIS, Žarko MULJAČIĆ), Manuel pratique de philologie romane, Paris: Picard, 2 vol.
- Blaquièra J. (1985) Dictionnaire français-nissart, langue d'oc, dialecte niçois, self-edited
- Calvino Jean-Baptiste (1905) Nouveau dictionnaire niçois-français, Nice: Imprimerie des Alpes Maritimes [re-ed. 1993 with the following title: Dictionnaire niçois-français, français-niçois, Nîmes: Lacour]
- Carles (Père) Pietro (1866) Piccolo vocabolario nizzardo-italiano, Nice
- Carles (Père) Pietro (1868) Piccolo vocabolario italiano-nizzardo, Nice
- Castellana Georges (1947) Dictionnaire niçois-français [re-ed. 2001, Nice: Serre]
- Castellana Georges (1952) Dictionnaire français-niçois [re-ed. 2001, Nice: Serre]
- Cerquiglini Bernard (2003) (dir.) Les langues de France, Paris: Presses Universitaires de France / Ministère de la Culture et de la Communication-DGLFLF: 125-136]
- Cerquiglini Bernard (2000) Histoire de la langue française 1945-2000. Co-edited with Gérald Antoine. Paris: CNRS Editions, 2000.
- Clapié Jaume, & BAQUIÉ Joan Pèire (2003) Pichin lèxico ilustrat, petit lexique illustré, niçard-françés, français-niçois, Nice: Serre
- Compan André (1965) Grammaire niçoise [re-ed. 1981, Nice: Serre]
- Compan André (1971) Anthologie de la littérature niçoise, coll. Biblioutèco d’istòri literàri e de critico, Toulon: L’Astrado
- Dalbera Jean-Philippe (1984) Les parlers des Alpes Maritimes: étude comparative, essai de reconstruction [PhD thesis], Toulouse: Université de Toulouse 2 [ed. 1994, London: Association Internationale d’Études Occitanes]
- Dalbera Jean-Philippe (2003) “Les îlots liguriens de France” [CERQUIGLINI Bernard (2003) (dir.) Les langues de France, Paris: Presses Universitaires de France / Ministère de la Culture et de la Communication-DGLFLF: 125-136]
- Escola de Bellanda (2002) Diciounari nissart-francés, Nice: Fédération des Associations du Comté de Nice / Serre
- Eynaudi Jules, & Cappati Louis (1931–1938) Dictionnaire de la langue niçoise, Niça: sn.
- Forner Werner A propos du ligure intémélien - La cote, l'arrière-pays Travaux du cercle linguistique de Nice 1996
- Forner Werner La dialettologia ligure. Problemi e prospettive in La dialettologia italiana oggi in G. Holtus, Tübingen 1985-1990
- Gasiglia Rémy (1984) Grammaire du nissart, sl.: Institut d’Études Niçoises
- Gauberti Pierre (1994) Dictionnaire encyclopédique de la langue de Peille [Pays Niçois], Nice: Serre
- Gioffredo Pietro Storia dele Alpi marittime libri XXIV, in HPM 1839, Torino (originally published in 1662)
- Giordan Joseph (1968) Dictionnaire français-niçois: lexique complémentaire du parler de la ville de Nice et des pays environnants, sl.: sn.
- Gourdon Marie-Louise (1997) Contribution à l’histoire de la langue occitane. Étude des systèmes graphiques pour écrire l’occitan (niçois, provençal, languedocien) de 1881 à 1919: itinéraires et travaux de A.L. Sardou, J.B. Calvino, L. Funel, A. Perbosc, P. Estieu [PdD thesis], Nice
- Liautaud René (1985) Essai de lexique français-entraunois avec correspondences en niçois, Nice: CRDP
- Miceu Giausep (1840) Grammatica nissarda: per emparà en pòou de temp lo patouas dòou paìs, Nice: Imprimarìa de la Sossietà tipografica [re-ed. Marie-Louise GOURDON (1975) La Grammatica nissarda de Joseph Micèu: biographie, étude sur les dialectes, commentaires philologiques, Nice: imprimerie Pierotti]
- Pellegrini (Abbé) (1894) Lexique niçois-français, Nice: no name
- Petracco Siccardi, Giulia L'amfizona Liguria Provenza Alessandria 1989
- Petracco Siccardi, Giulia e Caprini, Rita Toponomastica storica della Liguria, Genova, SAGEP, 1981
- Petracco Siccardi, Giulia Ligurien Lexicon der Romanistischen Linguistik II, 2, Tübingen, 1995
- Sardou Antoine Léandre, & Calvino Jean-Baptiste (1881) Grammaire de l’idiome niçois, Nice: Visconti [re-ed. 1978, Marseilles: Laffitte Reprints]
- Scaliero Giuseppe (1830) Vocabolario nizzardo, Nice: no name
- Toscano Reinat (1998) Gramàtica niçarda, no place: Princi Néguer
