= Institut d'Estudis Occitans =

The Institut d'Estudis Occitans (English: Occitan Studies Institute or Institute for Occitan Studies; Occitan pronunciation: [istiˈtyd desˈtyðiz utsiˈtas]), or IEO, is a cultural association that was founded in 1945 by a group of Occitan and French writers including Jean Cassou, Tristan Tzara, Ismaël Girard, Max Roqueta, Renat Nelli, and Pierre Rouquette. It aims at maintaining and developing the Occitan language and influence of Occitania through the supervision, harmonization and normalization of everything dealing with the Occitan life and culture.

The IEO is divided into regional and departmental sections and local circles that cover the whole of the country from the cities (called in vernacular language) of Lemòtges and Clarmont up north to Marselha, Tolosa or Bordèu down south. A number of carefully targeted activities are sponsored by groups and other associations affiliated with the institute, or by members themselves. The IEO is the Occitan counterpart of the Institut d'Estudis Catalans. Its motto is La fe sens òbras mòrta es ("Faith without works is dead").

== History ==
The first Institute for Occitan Studies was created around 1923 as a section of the League of Meridional Homeland (Ligue de la Patrie Méridionale), but had a short lifespan.

In 1930, the Society for Occitan Studies (SEO) was founded by Joseph Anglade and Valère Bernard, with Louis Alibert as secretary.

At the end of World War II, as both the Felibrige and the SEO had been discredited by the involvement of some of their leaders in the collaboration, some occitanists decided to create a new institution, the IEO, with a clear message: the IEO is an offspring of the Resistance.

=== Presidents of the IEO ===
President	From	To
Jean Cassou	1945	1952
Max Roqueta	1952	1957
Pierre Azéma	1957	1959
Robèrt Lafont	1959	1962
Pierre Bec	1962	1980
Patrick Choffrut	1980	1981
Alain Giacomo	1981	1986
Robert Marty	1986	1997
Philippe Carbonne	1997	2001
David Grosclaude	2001	2010
Pierre Brechet	2010	Present

== Affiliates ==
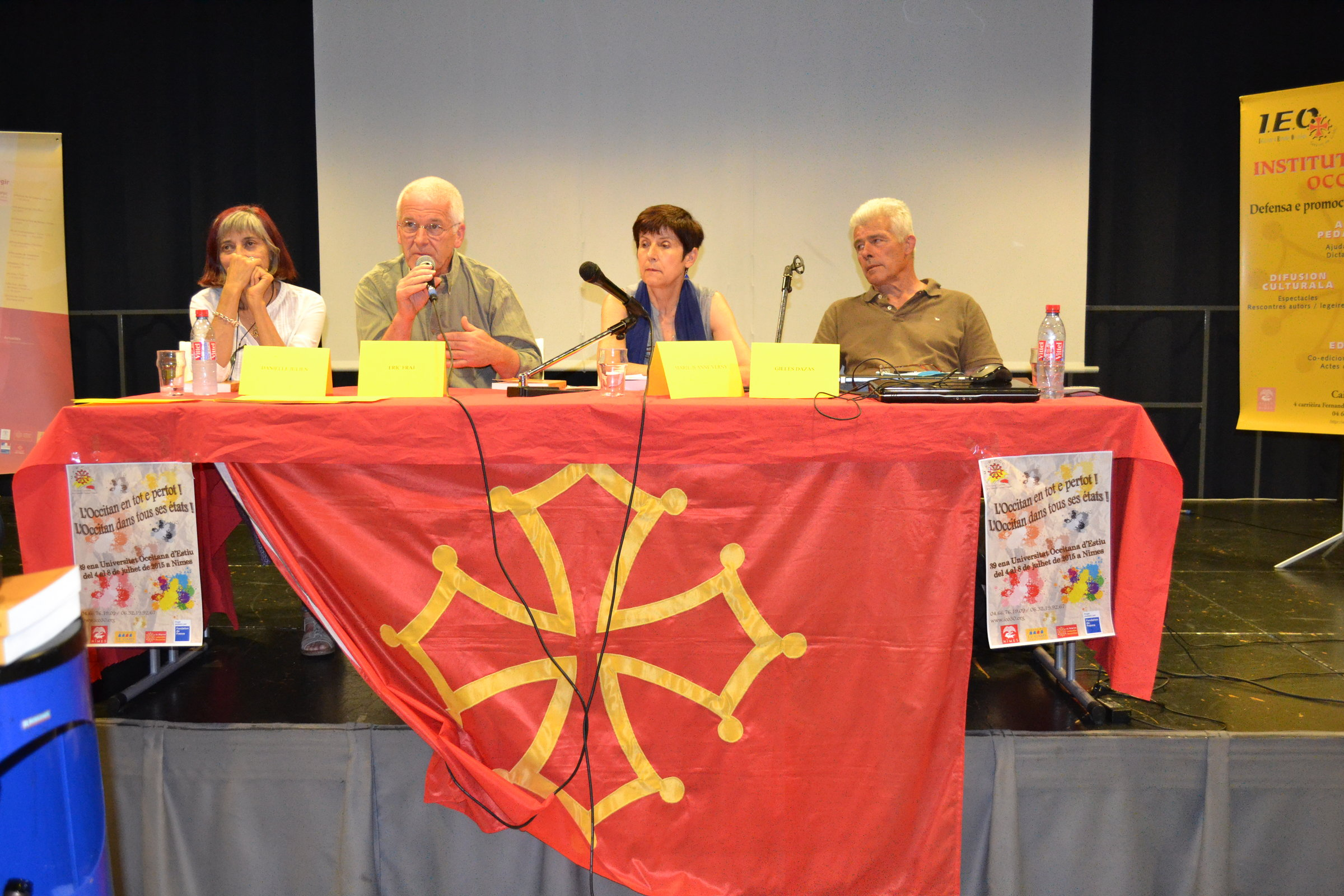
Summer Occitan University (UOE) 2015

IEO-Ideco: Ideco is the publishing house and distribution network of the Institut d'Estudis Occitans. It is based in Puèglaurenç.

EOE: the EOE or Escòla Occitana d'Estiu is the Occitan summer school. It is one week long and takes place every year in August in Vilanuèva d'Òlt.

UOE: the UOE or Universitat Occitana d'Estiu is the Occitan summer university. It is one week long and takes place every year in Nîmes.

== Controversy ==
The IEO went through several crises throughout its history, the most serious of which in the late 1970s and early 1980s when two ideologies clashed: the populist view of Ives Roqueta, and a more academic one promoted by Robèrt Lafont. This confrontation led to the eviction of Lafont and his followers from the institute, which nearly sealed the fate of all scientific projects at the IEO, with many researchers finding jobs in universities and the Associacion Internacionala d'Estudis Occitans ("International Occitan Studies Association"). Most linguists among them migrated also to the Gidilòc and the Conselh de la Lenga Occitana ("Occitan Language Council"). Nevertheless, the IEO has remained the leading organization in the field of cultural life and by far the most popular body among Occitan activists.
