= Languedocian dialect =

Occitan dialect

Languedocian
- lengadocian
- Native to: France
- Region: Southern France
- Native speakers: (undated figure of 5,000)
- Language family: Indo-European: Italic; Latino-Faliscan; Latin; Romance; Italo-Western; Western Romance; Gallo-Romance; Occitano-Romance; Occitan; Languedocian

Language codes
- ISO 639-3: lnc (retired); subsumed in oci
- Glottolog: lang1309
- ELP: Languedocien
- IETF: oc-lengadoc
- The extent of Languedocien in the Occitan area

Languedocian (French: Languedocien [lɑ̃ɡdɔsjɛ̃]) or Lengadocian (Occitan pronunciation: [ˌleŋɡɔðuˈsja]) is an Occitan dialect spoken in rural parts of southern France such as Languedoc, Rouergue, Quercy, Agenais and southern Périgord. It is sometimes also called Languedocien-Guyennais. Owing to its central position among the dialects of Occitan, it is often used as a basis for a Standard Occitan.

About 10% of the population of Languedoc are fluent in the language (about 300,000), and another 20% (600,000) "have some understanding" of the language. All speak French as their first or second language.

== Geographic distribution ==
Languedocian is spoken in certain parts of three French regions.

- Occitanie: Aveyron, Lot, Tarn, Tarn-et-Garonne except Lomagne, Ariège (except a western part), Haute-Garonne (except the districts of Saint-Gaudens and Muret), Aude, Hérault, Lozère, western and northern parts of Gard and Fenouillèdes.
- Nouvelle-Aquitaine: south of the Dordogne, east of the Gironde, north-eastern two-thirds of Lot-et-Garonne, the southern fringe of Corrèze.
- Auvergne-Rhône-Alpes: area of Bas-Vivarois, Languedocien-Nord-Cévenol

Other dialects spoken in these areas include: Gascon, Catalan, Limousin, and Auvergnat, as well as the unrelated Basque language.

== Characteristics ==
The following are the main characteristics of the Languedocian dialect:

- occlusives are kept at the end of a word: cantat [kanˈtat] (in Provençal: [kãnˈta]);
- preservation of the final s of a word: los òmes [luˈzɔmes] (in Limousin: [luzɔˈmej]);
- the final n of a word is dropped: occitan [utsiˈta] (in Provençal: [usiˈtãn]);
- absence of palatalisation of CA and GA groups: cantar, gal (in Auvergnat: chantar, jal);
- preservation of the final l of a word (i.e. not vocalised): provençal (in Provençal and in Gascon: provençau);
- lack of distinction between the sounds b and v (betacism): vin [bi] (in Auvergnat, Limousin and Provençal: [vji], [vi], [vin]).

None of these characteristics are unique to Languedocian; many are shared with one or more other Occitan dialects. Languedocian is both a central and conservative dialect. For these reasons, certain linguists are in favour of a standardisation of Occitan using Languedocian as a basis for this.

== Variations ==
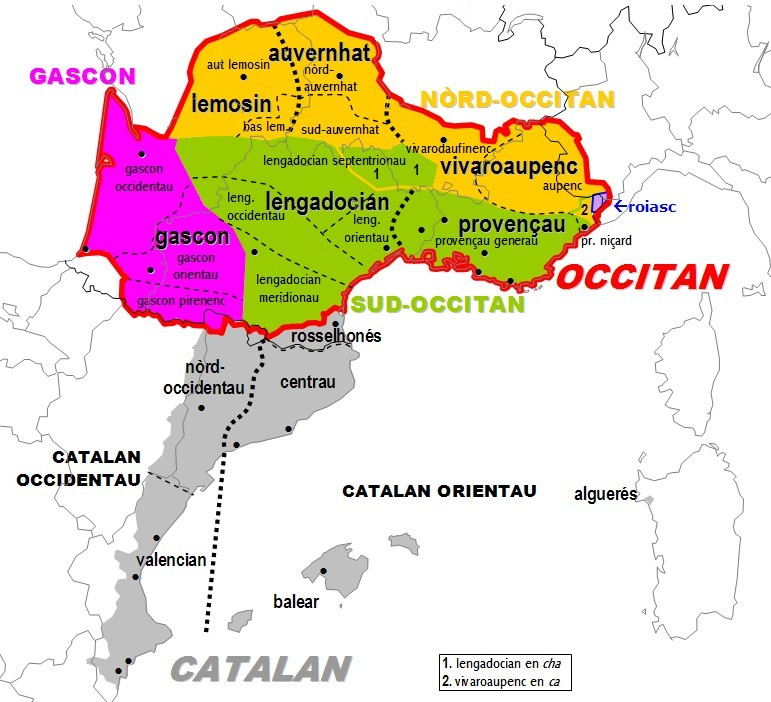
Dialects and sub-dialects of Occitan according to D. Sumien

Languedocien encompasses a number of variations, the classification of which is still ongoing.

Jules Ronjat gives three sub-groups:

- Eastern Languedocian dialects: Alésien, Montpelliérain, Lodévois, and Bitterrois (the latter tending towards Western Languedocian).
- Western Languedocian dialects: Narbonnais, Carcassonnais, Toulousain (including Fuxéen and Capcinois), Albigeois, Montalbanais, Agenais (the latter tending towards Guyennais and Gascon).
- Guyennais dialects: Rouergat, Gévaudanais (Lozère, Cévennes), Quercinois, Aurillacois, Sarladais, Bergeracois.
- He also classes Bas-Vivarois as a Languedocian dialect but separate from the above categories.

Louis Alibert uses four sub-groups:

- Eastern dialects: Cévenol, Montpelliérain, Bitterois.
- Southern dialects: Toulousain, Fuxéen, Donezanais, Narbonnais, "Central" (Carcassonais), Agenais.
- Western dialects: Bergeracois, Villeneuvois, Sarladais, Haut-Quercinois, Bas-Quercinois, Albigeois.
- Northern dialects: Aurillacois, Rouergat, Gévaudanais.

Domergue Sumien defines the categories thus:

- Eastern dialects: Cévenol, Montpelliérain.
- Southern dialects: Toulousain, Fuxéen, Donezanais, Narbonnais, Carcassonais.
- Western dialects: Bas-Quercinois, Albigeois, Agenais, Bitterois.
- Northern dialects: Bergeracois, Villeneuvois, Sarladais, Haut-Quercinois, Aurillacois, Rouergat, Gévaudanais, Bas-Vivarois.

In their supra-dialectal classification of Occitan, Pierre Bec and Domergue Sumien divide Languedocian into one or two supra-dialectal groups:

- Pierre Bec places Southern Languedocian dialects in the Aquitanian-Pyrenean group and the rest of the Languedocian dialects in the Central Occitanian group.
- Domergue Sumien classifies these Languedocian dialects similarly, but groups both Aquitanian-Pyrenean and Central Occitanian under the title of Pre-Iberian.
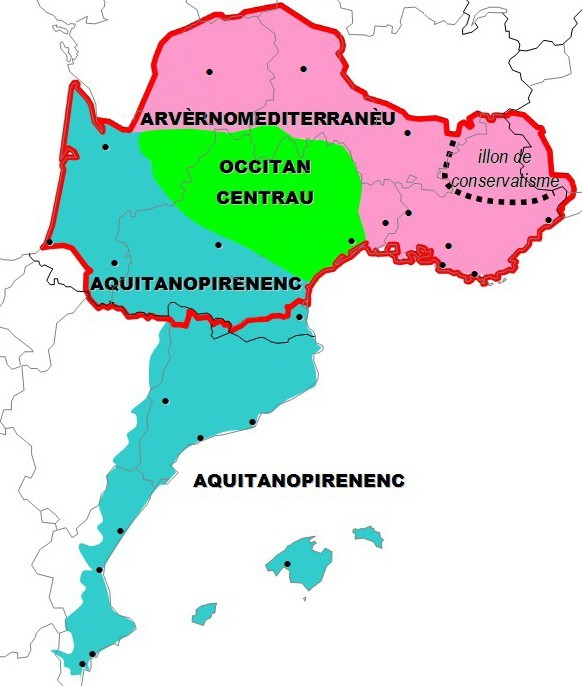
Supradialectal classification of Occitan according to P. Bec

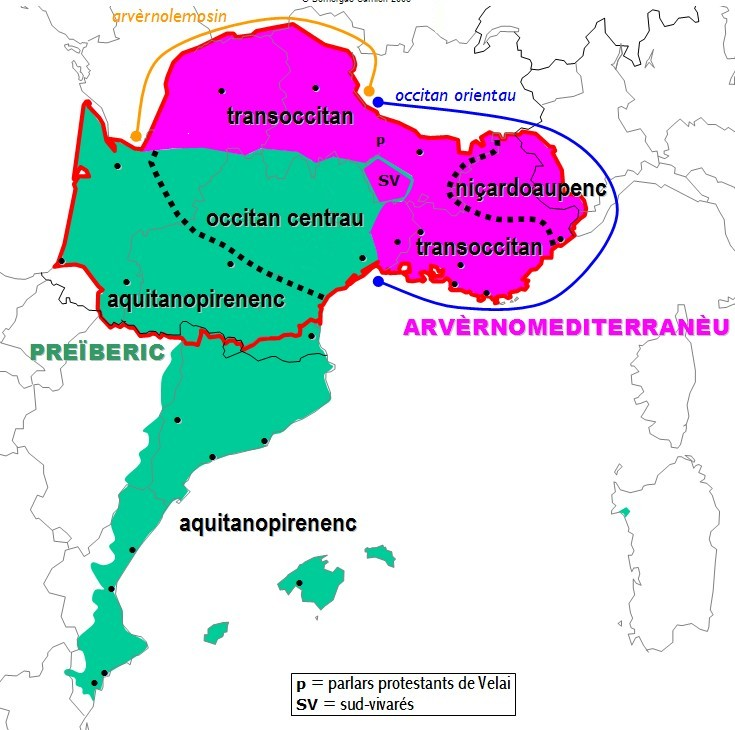
Supradialectal classification of Occitan according to D. Sumien

== Usage ==
With the absence of a linguistic census, it is difficult to obtain exact figures on the number of speakers. The most recent global studies on Occitan say the number of speakers ranges from 500,000 to 700,000 for the language as a whole. UNESCO, which is the only organisation to treat Languedocian independently, estimates the number at around 500,000, and considers the language under serious threat.

== See also ==
- Occitan conjugation
- Languages of France
- Lenga d'òc
- Émile Mazuc, scholar of the Languedocian language
