= Domergue Sumien =

Occitan linguist and writer

Domergue Sumien (in Occitan Domergue Sumien, in French Dominique Sumien; born July 5, 1968, in Compiègne, France) is an Occitan linguist and writer. He is a member of the Occitan Language Council. He used to work in the International Association for Occitan Studies (AIEO).

Sumien is working towards the improvement of a standard written Occitan, named „broad Occitan" (occitan larg) as initially defined by Louis Alibert, Robèrt Lafont, and Patrick Sauzet. As a member of the Occitan Language Council, he co-wrote a new set of recommendations for the orthography of standard Occitan. In his PhD thesis, he enlarged his vision of a standard language and he also proposed to define some regional standards as he presents Occitan as a pluricentric language.

== Selected works ==
- 2012: "Occitan: harmonizing non-dominant standards throughout four states", in: Rudolf MUHR (ed.) (2012): Non-dominant varieties of pluricentric languages. Getting the picture (in memory of Michael Clyne), coll. Österreichisches Deutsch Sprache der Gegenwart 14, Frankfurt/Berlin/Bruxelles/New York/Oxford/Wien: Peter Lang, pp. 263–282
- 2011: collaborador a l'edicion d'Angelica RIEGER (ed.) (2001) L'Occitanie invitée de l'Euregio. Liège 1981 - Aix-la-Chapelle 2008 : Bilan et perspectives — Actes du Neuvième Congrès de l'Association Internationale d'Études Occitanes
- 2009: "Classificacion dei dialèctes occitans", Lingüistica occitana 7
- 2009: "Comment rendre l'occitan disponible? Pédagogie et diglossie dans les écoles Calandretas", in: SAUZET Patrick, & PIC François (dir.) (2009), Politique linguistique et enseignement des "langues de France", Paris: L'Harmattan, pp. 67-86
- 2009: "L'estandardizacion deu gascon: l'ensenhament, la koinè e lo diasistèma", in: LATRY Guy (2009) (ed.) La Voix occitane, actes du VIIIe Congrès de l'Association internationale d'études occitanes, Bordeaux, 2005, Pessac : Presses universitaires de Bordeaux, t. II / pp. 837-850
- 2007: "Lo ròtle de la lexicografia dins la planificacion lingüistica", Linguistica Occitana 5
- 2007: "Besonhs e amiras de la sociolingüistica aplicada en Occitània", in Anàlisi del discurs sociolingüístic català i occità, amb motiu del 60è anniversari de Georg Kremnitz, Wien: Praesens Verlag, pp. 181-200
- 2007: Preconizacions del Conselh de la Lenga Occitana, Lingüistica Occitana 6
- 2006: La standardisation pluricentrique de l'occitan. Nouvel enjeu sociolinguistique, développement du lexique et de la morphologie, coll. Publications de l'Association Internationale d'Études Occitanes, Turnhout: Brepols
- 2006: en collaboration avec Santiago MARTÍNEZ ARRIETA: "Els lligams entre català i occità: alguns problemes de representació, descripció i estandardització", in: Miscel·lània Joan Veny, vol. 8, Montserrat: Publicacions de l'Abadia de Montserrat
- 2005: "La terminologia informatica en occitan: la revirada dels logicials OpenOffice e Spip", Linguistica Occitana 3
- 2003: "L'occitan, lenga fantasmada: l'exemple de la toponimia", in: LIEUTARD Hervé, & VERNY Marie-Jeanne, (2003) (ed.) Nouvelle recherche en domaine occitan: actes du colloque Jeunes chercheurs ReDòc (UMR 5475), avril 2002, coll. Lo Gat Negre, Montpellier: ReDòc-CEO-Université Paul Valéry, pp. 129-147.
- 2000: "La question de la h dens los noms pròpris estrangèrs", Reclams 777: pp. 15–16.
