= Meridional French =

Regional variant of the French language, influenced by Occitan

- français méridional
- Native to: Occitania
- Ethnicity: Occitans
- Language family: Indo-European: Italic; Latino-Faliscan; Romance; Italo-Western; Western Romance; Gallo-Romance; Gallo-Rhaetian (possibly); Oïl; French; Meridional French
- Early forms: Old Latin: Classical Latin; Vulgar Latin; Old Gallo-Romance; Old French; Middle French

Language codes
- ISO 639-3: –
- Glottolog: None

Meridional French (French: français méridional; Occitan: francés meridional), also referred to as Francitan (a portmanteau of français and occitan), is the regional variant of the French language spoken in the area of Marseille, Avignon and Toulouse. It is influenced by the Occitan language.

There are speakers of Meridional French in all generations, but the accent is most marked among the elderly, who often speak Occitan as their first language.

== Characteristics ==
The phonology, morphology, syntax and lexicon of Occitan have all influenced Meridional French, but the phonological effects are perhaps the most salient by producing the characteristic accent, which is used by speakers of Meridional French. Those effects include the following:

- The loss of phonemic nasal vowels, which are replaced by an oral vowel followed by a nasal consonant
- the frequent realisation of the final atonal vowels of Latin, which are lost by speakers of other varieties of French, as schwa
- the presence of lexical stress on the penultimate syllable of many words, in contrast to the phrase-final stress of Standard French

Meridional French is also subject to a phonological law known as the Law of Position in which mid-vowels are subject to allophonic variation based on the shape of their syllables; they are realised as mid-open in closed syllables (those ending in a consonant) and as mid-close in open syllables (those ending in a vowel). The phenomenon has been shown to be somewhat more complex, however, by Durand (1995), Eychenne (2006), and Chabot (2008). The principle is strictly adhered to by speakers of Meridional French, in contrast to those of other varieties of French.

== Phonology ==
- Lexical (or word-based) stress is used, unlike the prosodic stress of Standard French.
- Nasal vowels have not changed but are still pronounced as in traditional Parisian French or with a nasal consonant after the vowel: enfant [ɑ̃(ŋ)ˈfɑ̃(ŋ)], pain [pɛ̃(ŋ)], timbre [ˈtɛ̃(m)bʁ(ə)], bon [bɔ̃(ŋ)] and brun [bʁœ̃(ŋ)].
- The "e caduc" is always pronounced by older speakers, even at the end of words. For example, cerise (cherry) is pronounced [səˈʁiːzə], tête (head) is pronounced [ˈtɛtə], and it is sometimes pronounced even if there is no e; ciel (sky) [ˈsjɛlə].
- /o/, /ø/, /e/ merge with /ɔ/, /œ/, /ɛ/, the resulting phonemes being pronounced open-mid in stressed syllables (unless word-final, where they are close-mid) and close-mid in unstressed syllables (except before /ʁC/ clusters, where they are open-mid). As a result, both notre and nôtre are pronounced as [ˈnɔtʁə] and both jeune and jeûne are as [ˈʒœnə].

== Vocabulary ==
A number of words are peculiar to Meridional French, for example, péguer ('to be sticky'; Occitan: pegar; Standard French poisser), chocolatine (Southwest; Standard French pain au chocolat), cagade (Occitan cagada) or flûte (a larger baguette, known as a pain parisien 'Parisian loaf' in Paris).

Some phrases are used with meanings that differ from those of Standard French. For example, s'il faut, literally meaning 'if necessary', is used to mean "perhaps", as a calque of the Occitan se cal, which would be rendered in Standard French as peut-être 'may-be'.

== Internal variation ==
Many sub-varieties of Meridional French exist, with distinctive features.

Examples of diatopic variation include lexical differences between the French spoken in Toulouse, as described by Séguy (1950), and that spoken in Bayonne, described by Lambert (1928).

Diastratic variation is also extant in Meridional French. The sociolects spoken by the Jews of Gascony, whose large set of special vocabulary used only within the group has been linguistically described by Nahon (2018), is one of the most distinctive sub-dialects of Meridional French.

== Sources ==
- Chabot, Alex (2004). "Suprasegmental Structure in Meridional French and its Provençal Substrate" (PDF). Archived from the original (PDF) on 2011-05-11.
- Durand, Jacques (1995). "Alternances vocaliques en français du midi et phonologie du gouvernement". Lingua. 95 (1–3): 27–50. doi:10.1016/0024-3841(95)90100-0.
- Eychenne, Julien (2006). "Aspects de la phonologie du schwa dans le français contemporain. Optimalité, visibilité prosodique, gradience." (PDF) (in French). Archived (PDF) from the original on 2015-07-22.
- Lambert, Jacques (1928), "Sur quelques particularités du parler bayonnais", Bulletin trimestriel de la Société des sciences, lettres & arts de Bayonne: 275–306.
- Séguy, Jean (1950), Le Français parlé à Toulouse (in French), Toulouse: Privat.
- Nahon, Peter (2018), Gascon et français chez les Israélites d'Aquitaine. Documents et inventaire lexical (in French), Paris: Classiques Garnier, ISBN 978-2-406-07296-6.
