= Pierre Brechet =

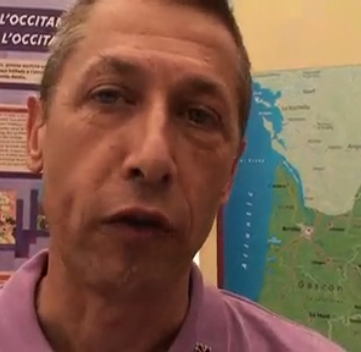
Pèire Brechet

Pierre Brechet (occitan Pèire Brechet, b. 22 May 1956) is an Occitan teacher, scholar, and activist, living in Marseille. Since 2010 he is the president of the Institut d'Estudis Occitans.

== Publications ==
- Elie Lèbre, Guy Martin, Bernard Moulin, Dictionnaire de base français-provençal, 2nd edition revised by Bernard Moulin and Pierre Brechet, Aix-en-Provence: CREO Provença, 2004, ISBN 2-7449-0522-4
- Guy Martin; Bernard Moulin; Pierre Bréchet, Grammaire provençale et cartes linguistiques, Aix-en-Provence: Comitat Sestian d'estudis occitans, 1998, ISBN 2-7449-0043-5
- Pierre Brechet, Vocabulari provençau en images - Estructuras basicas, Toulon: Institut d'Estudis Occitans - Seccion de Var, 1988
- Pierre Brechet, Manuau pratic de lectura e prononciacion, Toulon: Institut d'Estudis Occitans - Seccion de Var
- Pierre Brechet, Communiquer en occitan provençal. Des mots aux idées, des idées aux mots, Aix-en-Provence: CREO Provença, 2017, ISBN 9782953071283
