= Nissa La Bella =

Unofficial anthem of the city of Nice, France

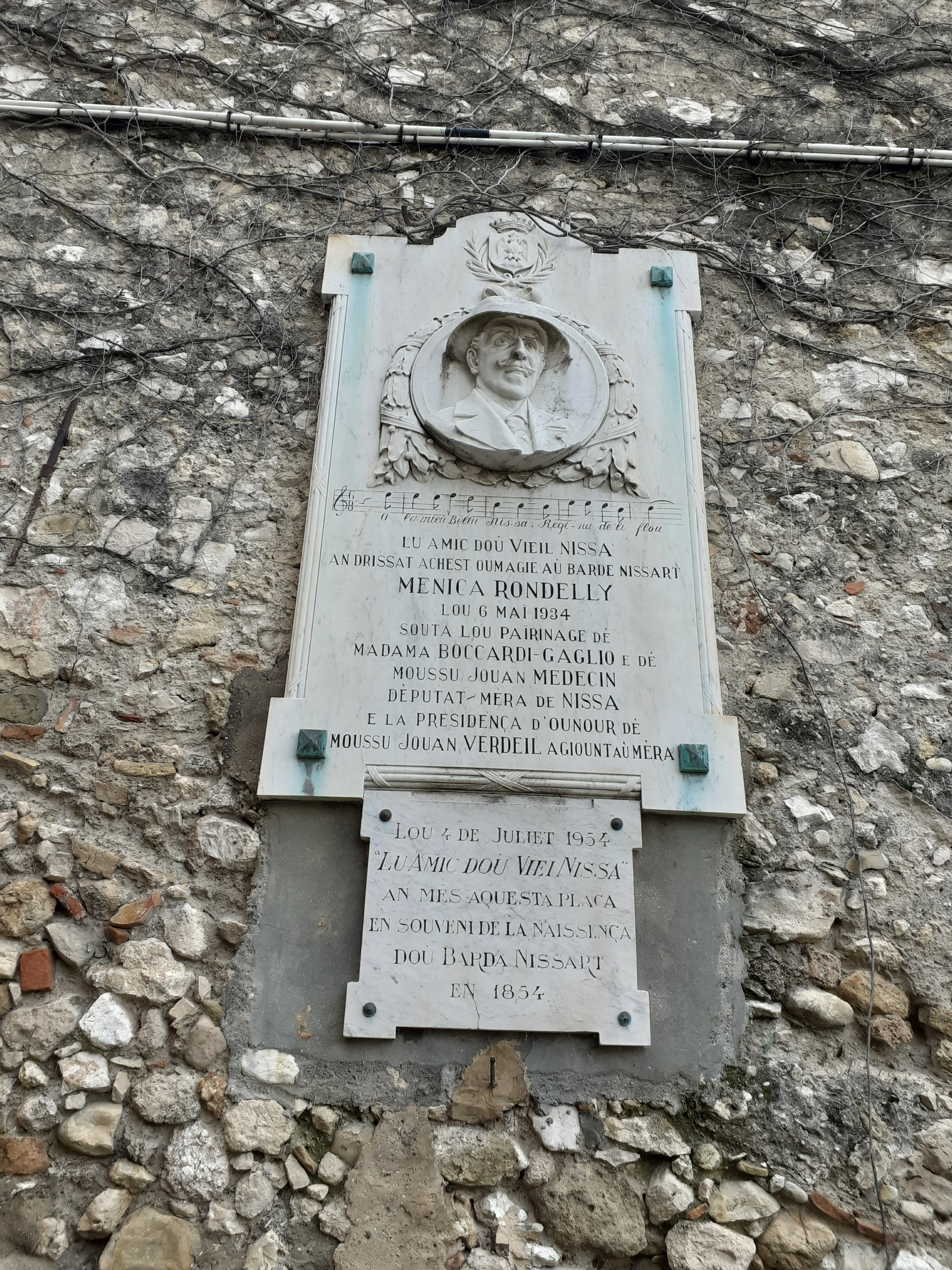
Monument in niçard dedicated to Menica Rondelly, the author

"Nissa la Bella" (Nice the Beautiful) is the unofficial anthem of the city of Nice, France. It is written in Niçard, a dialect of Occitan that is the original language of the city. It was written by Menica Rondelly in 1903, first under the title of A la mieu bella Nissa; the song takes its actual name in 1906, after some arrangements. An alternative version, Nissa rebella, has been sung by the artist Mauris Sgaravizzi in the 1980's.

== Text ==
Classical norm	Original
Niça la bèla	Nissa la bella
Viva, viva, Niça la Bèla Ò la mieu bèla Niça Regina de li flors Li tieus vielhi teulissas Ieu canterai totjorn. Canterai li montanhas Lu tieus tant rics decòrs Li tieus verdi campanhas Lo tieu gran soleu d'òr [d'aur] Refrin Totjorn ieu canterai Sota li tieus tonèlas La tieu mar d’azur Lo tieu cièl [cèu] pur E totjorn griderai En la mieu ritornèla Viva, viva, Niça la Bèla Canti la capelina La ròsa e lo lillà Lo Pòrt e la Marina Palhon, Mascoinà ! Canti la sofieta Dont naisson li cançons Lo fus, la colonheta, La mieu bèla Nanon. Canti li nòstri glòrias L’antic e bèu calen Dau donjon li victòrias L’odor dau tieu primtemps! Canti lo vielh Sincaire Lo tieu blanc drapèu Pi lo brèç de ma maire Dau monde, lo plus bèu	Viva, viva, Nissa la Bella O la miéu bella Nissa Regina de li flou Li tiéu vielhi taulissa Iéu canterai toujou. Canterai li mountagna Lu tiéu tant ric decor Li tiéu verdi campagna Lou tiéu gran soulèu d'or Refrin Toujou iéu canterai Souta li tiéu tounella La tiéu mar d’azur Lou tiéu cièl pur E toujou griderai en la miéu ritournella Viva, viva, Nissa la Bella Canti la capelina La rosa e lou lilà Lou Pouòrt e la Marina Paioun, Mascouinà ! Canti la soufieta Doun naisson li cansoun Lou fus, la coulougneta, La miéu bella Nanoun. Canti li nouòstri gloria L’antic e bèu calèn Dòu doungioun li vitoria L’oudou dòu tiéu printemp ! Canti lou vielh Sincaire Lou tiéu blanc drapèu Pi lou brès de ma maire Dòu mounde lou plus bèu
