= Louis Alibert =

French linguist

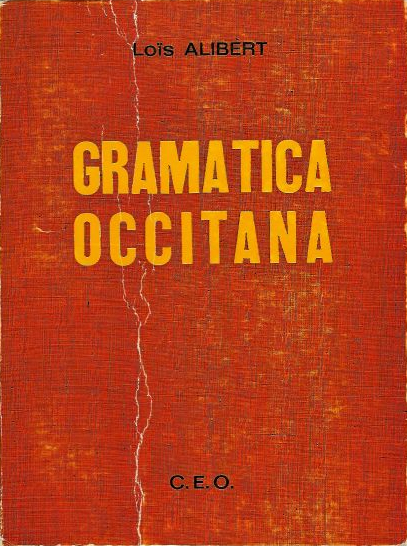
Gramatica occitana (Occitan grammar), Alibert (1976 reedition)

Adrien Louis Marie Alibert, known as Louis Alibert (Loís Alibèrt in Occitan; 1884–1959) was a French linguist, born on October 12, 1884, in Bram in the Aude and died on April 16, 1959, in Montpellier. He specialized in Occitan and Languedocien. He is also the initiator of the classical standard of Occitan, adopted by the Institute of Occitan Studies (IEO) in 1945.

== Biography ==
Alibert was born in Bram in the Aude, in Lauragais, on 12 October 1884, to a family of peasants who spoke Occitan.

He completed his studies in pharmacy, philology and history. He graduated from méridional and history studies.

Postponed in 1905 and 1906, Alibert was incorporated into the 81st Infantry Regiment in 1907. He made his classes in availability on July 11, 1908, then was placed in reserve on October 1, 1908, until his recall to the flag at the beginning. of August 1914. He carried out his first period of exercises from August 17, 1910, to September 13, 1913, in the 113th Infantry Regiment and the second in the 148th Infantry Regiment.

Alibert took part in the First World War, during which he was appointed corporal on August 10, 1914, an auxiliary pharmacist on March 1, 1916, 2nd class assistant pharmacist temporarily on October 19, 1918, in the Territorial Army. He was placed at the disposal of the health service of the 16th Army Corps on February 14, 1919, which assigned him to the complementary hospital n ° 12 in Castelnaudary. He was demobilized on June 17, 1919, but remained in the territorial army reserve until 1925. He was appointed 1st class assistant pharmacist in 1924, and released from his military service obligations in 1932.

He dedicated his career to the restoration and normalization of the modern Occitan language. He was secretary general of the Societat d'Estudis Occitans, created in Toulouse in 1930, and followed the methods of the Institut d'Estudis Catalans.

In 1935, the Office of Southern Relations of the Generalitat of Catalonia published in Barcelona his work Gramatica occitana segon los parlars lengadocians, dedicated exclusively to the speakers of Languedoc, which served as the base for the purification of the rest of the Occitan dialects.

After World War II, in 1946, Alibert was convicted of Indignité nationale as a collaborator with Pétain's Regime. He was given a five-year prison sentence. He was freed in 1951 after the completion of his sentence.

Alibert also worked toward the creation of a common literary language, a goal partially reached after the Second World War by the new Institut d'Estudis Occitans, successor to the Societat. In his later years he recompiled materials for an Occitan dictionary, destined to end with the fragmentation of the literary language and the Frankification of the vocabulary, orthography, and syntax. He died before completing this work, which was published posthumously (Dictionnaire occitan-français, 1965).

== Works ==
- Gramatica occitana segon los parlars lengadocians, 1935-1937
- Les troubadours de l'Aude, 1941
- Origine et destin de la langue d'Oc, 1942
- Tèrra d'Òc, 1908-1930
- Sur quelques toponymes catalano-occitans dans l'Aude, 1956
- Toponymes de l'Aude, 1957
- Sept élégies de Tibulle traduites en languedocien, 1928
- Dictionnaire occitan-français selon les parlers languedociens, 1966 (posthumous)
