= Ives Roqueta =

French writer (1936–2015)

Ives Roqueta (Occitan pronunciation: [ˈives ruˈketɔ]; born 29 February 1936 in Sète, Hérault, died January 4, 2015) was an Occitan author. He played a major role in the country's political and cultural movement. Roqueta was the president of the Institut d'Estudis Occitans (IEO) for a number of years and his brother Joan, better known as Joan Larzac, is also a writer and an Occitan activist. He founded the Ventadorn record company, which is credited for providing Nòva cançon singers with a media outlet.

== Controversy ==
Roqueta's cultural and political activities were highly controversial. He was regarded by some Occitan activists as a pioneer of his generation and one of the nation's most talented poets and novelists. Others have maintained that he had a negative impact on the Occitan movement during the late 1970s and the 1980s. In particular, his anti-academic positions led to the IEO's split in 1981.

== Bibliography ==
=== Poems ===
- L'Escriveire public (The Letter-Writer), 1958
- Lo Mal de la tèrra (The Land's Evil), 1958
- Roèrgue, si (Yes to Rouergue), 1968
- Òda a Sant Afrodisi (An Ode to Saint Aphrodite), 1968
- Lo Castèl des cans (The Castle of the Dogs), 1977
- Messa pels pòrcs (A Mass for the Pigs), 1970
- Los Negres, siam pas sols (Blacks, Let's Not Be Alone), 1972
- Lo Fuòc es al cementiri (The Cemetery's on Fire), 1974
- Misericòrdia (Mercy), 1986
- L'Escritura publica o pas (Letter-Writing or Not), 1988, a collection of poems written between 1972 and 1987

=== Prose ===
- Lo Poèta es una vaca (The Poet Is a Cow), 1967
- La Paciéncia (Patience), 1968
- Made in France (1970)
- Lo Trabalh de las mans (Handmade), 1977
- Lengadòc Roge (Red Languedoc), 1984

=== Essays ===
- Los Carbonièrs de La Sala (Decazeville's Miners), 1975
- Las Cronicas de Viure (The Chronicles in Viure magazine), 1963–1974

== Discography ==
- Messa Pels Porcs ("Mass For Pigs"), Institut D'estudis Occitans/Ventadorn I.E.O. S-4 332, 1971
