= Renat Nelli =

Occitan writer

Renat Nelli (Occitan pronunciation: [reˈnad ˈnelːi]), who was born in Carcassonne, Aude in 1906 and died in 1982, was one of the major Occitan writers of the 20th century.

In Vichy France, Nelli joined the French Resistance and in 1945 was one of the co-founders of the Institut d'Estudis Occitans. He also co-wrote the special issue of the Cahiers du Sud magazine on "the Genius of Òc and the Mediterranean Man" (1943), in which the three main lines of his literary mission stand out: the publication and translation of medieval Occitan poets; publishing his own poems; and being a critic. His collections are marked with sensuality and draw their inspiration from the mystical traditions of Cathars and trobadors. He later tried his hand at prose and drama. Renat Nelli is known in French as René Nelli.

== Works ==
- Entre l’espèr e l’abséncia (Between Hope and Absence), 1942
- Arma de vertat (A Soul for Real), 1952
- Vespèr e la luna dels fraisses (Vespèr and the Moon of the Ash Trees), 1962
- L'érotique des troubadours, Toulouse, Privat, 1963 (& 10/18 - 2 vol. - 1974)
- Beatrís de Planissòlas, 1972, a play
- Per una nuèit d'estieu (On a Summer Night), 1976
