= Robèrt Lafont =

French linguist (1923–2009)

Robèrt Lafont (Occitan pronunciation: [ruˈβɛɾt laˈfun]; March 16, 1923 in Nîmes – June 24, 2009 in Florence) was a French intellectual from Provence. He was a linguist, an author, an historian, an expert in literature and a political theoretician. His name in French reads Robert Lafont.

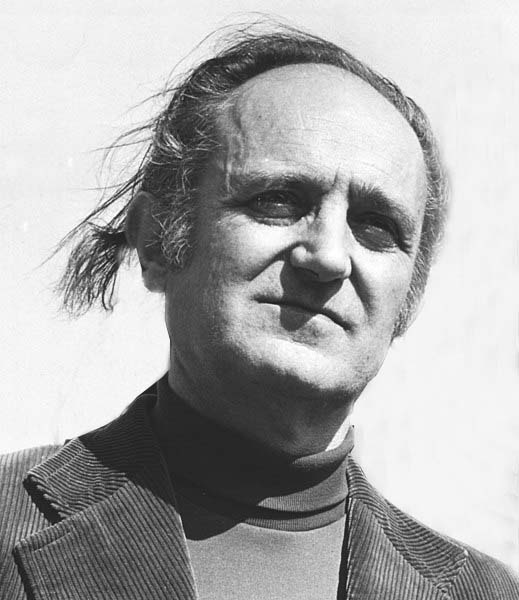
Robert Lafont, 1923-2009

== Biography ==
Robèrt Lafont was professor emeritus at the Paul-Valéry University of Montpellier. A professional linguist, he was a polyglot, novelist, poet, playwright, essayist and a medievalist. A versatile writer, Lafont wrote nearly a hundred books in Occitan, French, Catalan and Italian. The wide scope of themes he explores includes the history of literature and of society, linguistics and sociolinguistics and the social-economic imbalance in France and Europe.

In the essays he wrote in French, Robèrt Lafont tackles the problems encountered not only by the people of Occitania but also the various minorities struggling for official recognition under French rule, such as Bretons, Catalans, Basques, Corsicans or Alsatians among others. Lafont is a key figure in the analysis of internal colonialism, as far as lo País is concerned. On the other hand, the Occitan side of his works stands out as a revolutionary change in the literary production in la lenga nòstra, inasmuch as it completely breaks off with the more usual tradition of folklore and tales.

Robèrt Lafont founded the Occitan Committee for Study and Action (COEA) and ran a number of reviews, most notably L'Ase negre (The Black Donkey) in 1946 and Viure (Live) in 1962. He also produced and sponsored social theatre. He became the chairman of the Institut d'Estudis Occitans but left in 1981 following internal disagreements with Ives Roqueta in particular. In 1974, he claimed to be interested in running for French presidency but never managed to meet the legal prerequisites.

== Works ==
=== Poetry ===
- Dire (1945–53) (Tell)
- La Loba (1959) (The She-Wolf)
- Poèma a l'estrangièra (1960) (A Poem to the Foreign Girl)
- Aire liure (1974) (Open Air)
- Lausa per un solèu mòrt e reviudat (1984) (A Slate for a Dead Sun Born Again)

=== Prose ===
- Vida de Joan Larsinhac (The Life of Joan Larsinhac) (1951)
- L'Icòna dins l'iscla (1971) (The Icon on the Island)
- Lo Decameronet (1983) (The Little Decameron)
- La Fèsta (1983–84), (The Party) Lo Cavalier de març (The March Rider) & Lo Libre de Joan (The Book of Joan)
- L'Enclaus (1992) (The Enclosure)

=== Drama ===
- Dòm Esquichòte (1973) (Don Quixote)
- Lei Cascavèus (1977) (The Male Genitals)
- La Croisade (1983) (The Crusade), in French

=== Essays in French ===
- La Révolution régionaliste (The Regionalist Revolution) (1967)
- Sur la France (On France) (1968)
- Décoloniser en France (Decolonizing France) (1971)
- Le Travail et la langue (Working & the Language) (1978)
- Nous, Peuple Européen (We European People) (1991)
- La Nation, l'État, les Régions (Nation, State & Regions) (1993)
