= Max Roqueta =

Max Roqueta (Argelliers, December 8, 1908 – June 22, 2005) was one of the most famous contemporary Occitan writers. A physician, he was also an activist (he had been president of the Institut d'Estudis Occitans from 1952 to 1957).

== Works ==
=== Prose ===
- Secrèt de l’èrba (1934)
- Sòmnis dau matin (1940)
- Sòmnis de la nuòch (1942)
- L’Ataüt d’Arnautz Daniel (1949)
- La Pietat dau matin (1963)
- Vèrd Paradís (1961)
- Vèrd Paradís II (1974)
- Lo Maucòr de l'unicòrn (1992)
- D'aicí mil ans de lutz (1995)

=== Poetry ===
- Lo Mètge de Cucunhan (1958)
- Lo Manit e los encants (1996)
- Tota la sabla de la mar (1997)
- Lo Corbatàs roge (1997)
