= Conselh de la Lenga Occitana =

Council for the Occitan language

The Conselh de la Lenga Occitana, or in English the Occitan Language Council (CLO), is the body responsible for managing and developing the standard variant of the Occitan language. The council was founded in 1996 and 1997.
