= Occitans =

Romance-speaking Mediterranean ethnic group

Occitans (French) Occitanos (Spanish) Occitans (Occitan) Occitani (Ligurian) Okzitanoak (Basque) Occitans (Catalan)
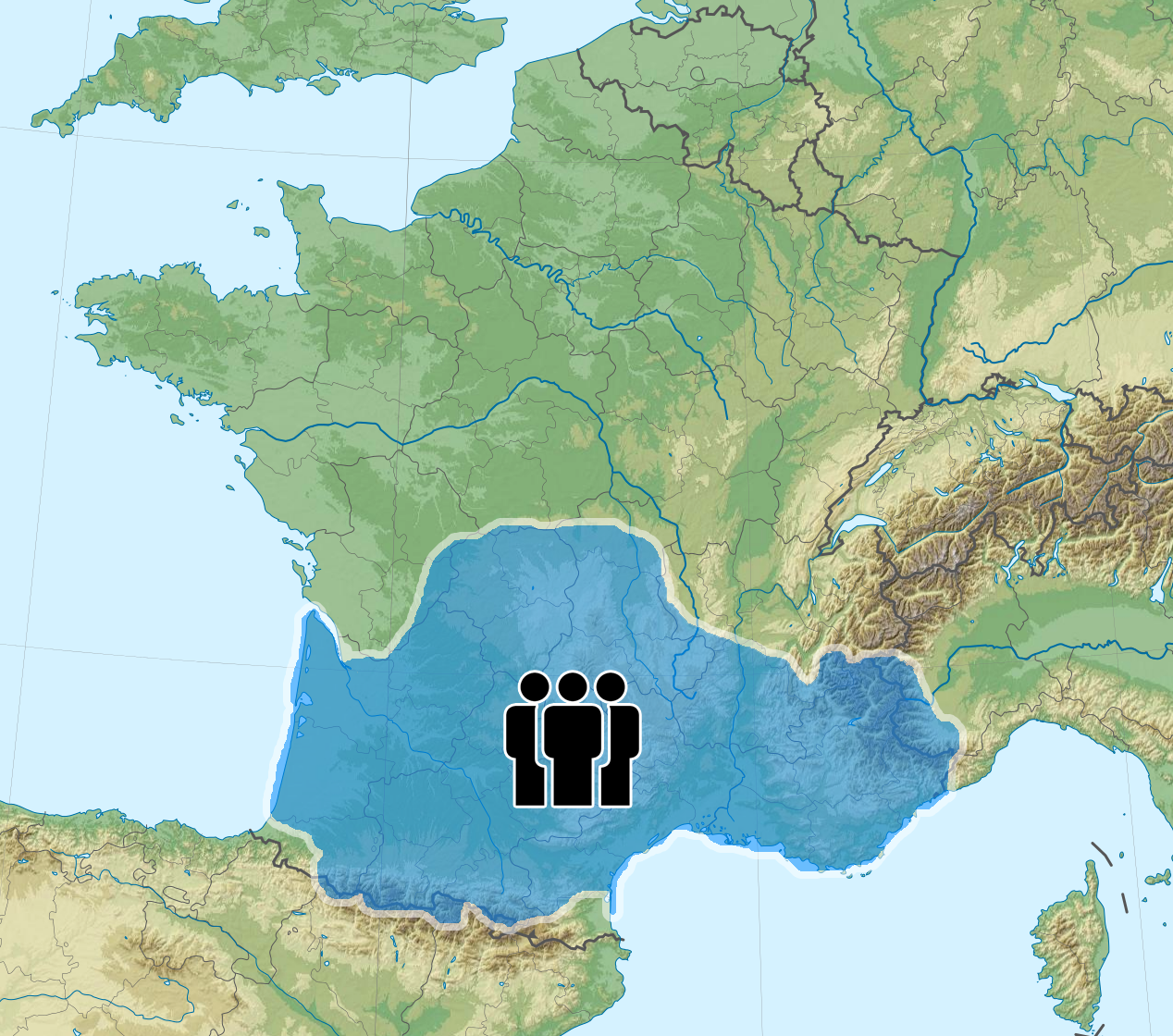

Total population
- c. 17 million

Regions with significant populations

Languages
- Occitan (native); French (Meridional), Italian, Piedmontese, Spanish, Catalan (as a result of language shift)

Religion
- Roman Catholicism, minority Protestantism and Waldensian

Related ethnic groups
- Catalans, Valencians, French, Spaniards, Ligurians, Cagots

The Occitans (Occitan: occitans) are a Romance ethnic group native to the historical region of Occitania (southern France, northeastern Spain, and northwestern Italy and Monaco). They have been also called Gascons, Provençals, and Auvergnats.

The Occitan language is still used to varying levels by between 100,000 and 800,000 speakers in southern France and northern Italy. Since 2006, the Occitan language is recognized as one of the official languages in Catalonia, an autonomous region of Spain.

The Occitans are concentrated in Occitania, but also in large urban centres in neighbouring regions: Lyon, Paris, Turin, and Barcelona. There are also ethnic Occitans in Guardia Piemontese (Calabria), as well as Argentina, Mexico, Canada, and the United States.

== See also ==
- Languedoc
- Septimania
- Mediterranean
- Hachmei Provence
- Iberia
- Catharism
- Albigensian Crusade
- Grimaldi Man
- Aquitani
- Iberians
- Occitan nationalism
