= George Gabriel =

American songwriter

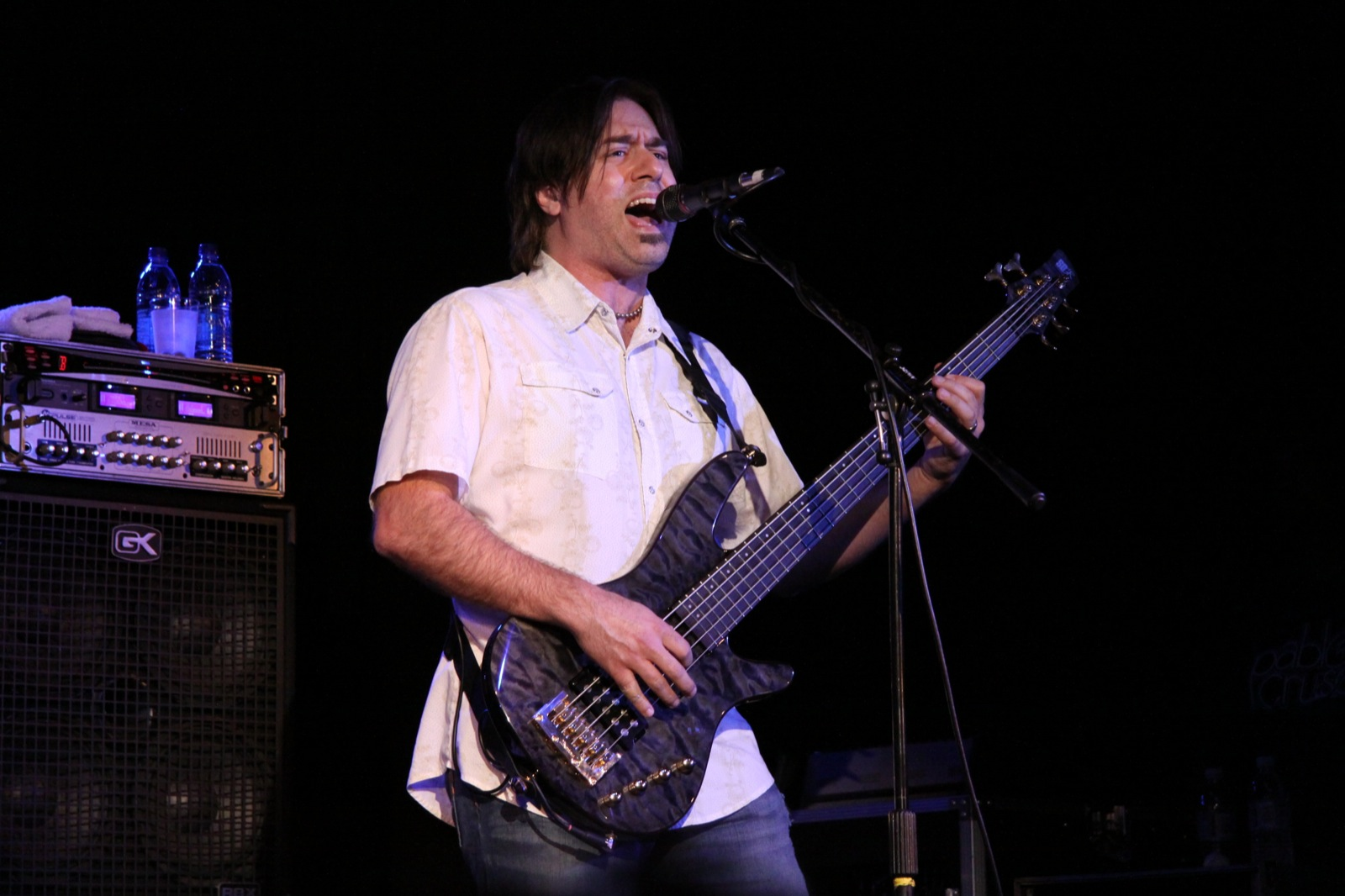
- Gabriel performing with Pablo Cruise in 2009

Background information
- Born: April 22, 1971 (age 55)
- Genres: Rock, pop, jazz
- Occupations: Musician, composer, film scorer, record producer, teacher
- Instruments: Vocals, bass, guitar, piano, drums, mandolin, vibraphone, cello, violin, xylophone
- Label: X-Revolution
- Website: Gabriel Music Mr G Rocks

George Gabriel (born April 22, 1971) is an American multi-instrumentalist and composer. He has composed and scored music for television and film for 23 years.

He began television composing in 1996 when he started working with the news music company Gari Communications. In 1999 he joined with composers Cory Lerios and John D'Andrea to score Baywatch Hawaii. Gabriel scored Lean Forward Media's direct-DVD release Choose Your Own Adventure. Gabriel wrote the theme of Disney's Kim Possible, "Call Me, Beep Me". It was the first Disney-produced song to reach #1 on Disney Radio, staying there for 14 weeks.

== TV music ==
The following music was created or co-created by George Gabriel.

Program	Network	Notes
Baywatch Hawaii	syndication	score
Beat the Clock	Universal Kids	theme and score
Diary of an Affair	E!	score
Dora and Friends: Into the City!	Nickelodeon	score and songs
Dora the Explorer	Nickelodeon	Seasons 6–8 score and songs Going to the Barbershop (Dora and Boots) Corta el Pelo (Sebastian Arcelus)
Extreme Planet	National Geographic	theme song
Growing Up Creepie	Discovery Kids	song - Watching You (Samantha Lombardi)
Hannity	Fox News	theme song
Hometown Heroes	DirecTV	score
Hubworld	The Hub	appeared as "G" and sang on the holiday episode
Inside the Pentagon	National Geographic	theme song
Intimate Portrait	Lifetime	score
Kim Possible	Disney Channel	Call Me, Beep Me (Christina Milian); I'm Ready (Angela Michael); Could It Be (Christy Carlson Romano); Call Me, Beep Me (Goldfinger Version)
Llama Llama	Netflix	Score and song Dance Llama, Dance (Jennifer Garner)
The Mummy	Kids' WB	score
network ID	The Film Zone	theme
network ID	Pro TV	theme
On the Edge	National Geographic	theme song
Parker Plays	Disney XD	score
Pictureka!	The Hub	musical director, composer and theme; appeared as the one-man band "G" on 66 episodes
Polaris Primetime	Disney XD	score
Rob & Amber - Against All Odds	Fox Reality Channel	theme and score
Scrabble Showdown	The Hub	theme and score
Sex Decoy - Love Stings	Fox Reality Channel	score
Shopaholic 911	Universal Studios	score
Sunny Side Up	Sprout	score
Sprout House	Universal Kids	songs and various music
Strange Felony Files	Court TV	score
Sunny Day (TV series)	Nickelodeon	songs and score
Surviving Everest	National Geographic	theme song
Toddworld	Discovery Kids/TLC	theme and score A Friend is a Friend (Geoff Byrd); Once You Get to Know Them (Kel Mitchell); A Special Shining Star (Cindy Herron) A Colorful World (Smokey Robinson)
Your World with Neil Cavuto	Fox News	theme song

== Pablo Cruise ==
After a long working relationship with the rock band Pablo Cruise's founding member Cory Lerios, Gabriel and Lerios began playing with founding member and drummer Steve Price in the fall of 2004. In 2004 Lerios and Price rejoined Pablo Cruise and Gabriel replaced original member Bud Cockrell on the bass. In Pablo Cruise, Gabriel played alongside the Little River Band, Starship, The Beach Boys, The Doobie Brothers and Journey. In November 2009. Gabriel and Pablo Cruise parted company.

== Solo career ==
In 2009, Gabriel released his first solo album, titled Everyday Miracles, available on iTunes and other digital music delivery sites. Everyday Miracles is about life, love, and faith. The inspiration of this album comes from Gabriel's walk in faith and how his trials and celebrations have formed who he is today. He played the drums, bass, guitar, and piano in addition to providing vocals. Every aspect of this recording is written, engineered, played, and produced by Gabriel in his Southern California studio. The song "Here I Am" is featured in the film Live To Forgive, which Gabriel also scored.

Gabriel teaches many students in the field of audio engineering. He was nominated and won the award for best teacher with the Moorpark College CEC program.

== Discography ==
Everyday Miracles
