= A Place in the Sun =

A Place in the Sun may refer to:

== Film and television ==
- A Place in the Sun (1916 film), a British silent film
- A Place in the Sun (1951 film), an American dramatic film
- A Place in the Sun (British TV series) (2000–present), a British Channel 4 lifestyle programme about buying property abroad
- A Place in the Sun (2012 film), a Swedish film based on the Liza Marklund novel
- A Place in the Sun (South Korean TV series), a 2019 South Korean television series

== Music ==
- A Place in the Sun (Lit album), 1999
- A Place in the Sun (Pablo Cruise album), 1977
- A Place in the Sun (Tim McGraw album), 1999
- "A Place in the Sun" (Stevie Wonder song), 1966
- "A Place in the Sun" (Pablo Cruise song), 1977
- "A Place in the Sun", a 1983 song by the Marine Girls, from their Lazy Ways album

== Other uses ==
- A place in the sun, a phrase used to refer to the German Empire's foreign policy (Weltpolitik) and colonial empire

== See also ==
- En plats i solen (disambiguation)
- "A Place Under the Sun", a 1999 single by Miho Nakayama
- "Lugar ao Sol", a 2001 song by Charlie Brown Jr.
- Um Lugar ao Sol, a 2021 Brazilian telenovela
- Un Lugar al sol, a 1965 Argentine film
- Un posto al sole, a 1996 Italian soap opera
