= Part of the Game =

Studio album by Pablo Cruise
- Released: October 1979
- Studios: Studio 55 (Hollywood); Cherokee (Hollywood); Redwing Sound (Tarzana); Sunset Sound (Los Angeles); Record Plant (Sausalito)
- Length: 40:04
- Label: A&M
- Producer: Bill Schnee

Pablo Cruise chronology
Worlds Away (1978)	Part of the Game (1979)	Reflector (1981)

Part of the Game is the fifth album by the California band Pablo Cruise, released in October 1979. The album marked a decline in the band's popularity, as it managed only to reach No. 39 in the United States. One single was released from the album: "I Want You Tonight", reaching No. 19 in the United States.

== Critical reception ==
Professional ratings
Review scores
Source	Rating
AllMusic	3.5/5 stars

The Globe and Mail wrote that "the problem is songwriter Cory Lerios, an under-achiever who takes little care with his tunes; he evidently picks an inoffensive chord pattern and constructs a series of notes that don't conflict, making preposterously weak melodies, which he then places on top of predictable rhythm tracks."

== Track listing ==
Side one

1. "Part of the Game" (Jenkins, Lerios, Allee Willis, Day) – 3:44
2. "I Want You Tonight" (Jenkins, Lerios, Willis) – 5:31
3. "When Love Is at Your Door" (Jenkins, Lerios, Willis) – 4:31
4. "Givin' It Away" (Jenkins, Lerios, Willis) – 5:18

Side two

1. "Tell Me That You Love Me" (Jenkins, Lerios, Willis) – 4:54
2. "Lonely Nights" (Jenkins, Lerios, Willis) – 5:23
3. "How Many Tears?" (Jenkins, Lerios, Willis, David Lasley) – 6:15
4. "For Another Town" (Lerios, Willis) – 4:28

== Charts ==
Chart (1979/80)	Peak position
Australia (Kent Music Report)	53
United States (Billboard 200)	39

== Personnel ==
Pablo Cruise

- David Jenkins – guitars, lead vocals
- Cory Lerios – piano, keyboards, synthesizers, backing vocals
- Bruce Day – bass, backing vocals
- Steve Price – drums, percussion

Additional musicians

- Gene Meros – saxophone (4)
- Mike Porcaro – bass
- Victor Feldman – percussion
- David Foster – synthesizers
- Michael Boddicker – synthesizers, synthesizer programming, synthesizer arrangement (2)
- Steve Porcaro – synthesizer programming

Technical

- Produced and engineered by Bill Schnee
- Assistant engineers – Alex Kash, Gabe Veltri, Cheech D'Amico, Anthony D'Amico, Gene Meros, and Niko Bolas
- Mixed by Bill Schnee at Sunset Sound and Record One (Los Angeles, CA)
- Mastered by Doug Sax and Mike Reese at The Mastering Lab (Los Angeles, CA)
- Illustration – Greg Brown
