= Kim Possible =

American animated television series

- Genre: Action comedy; Adventure
- Created by: Bob Schooley; Mark McCorkle
- Showrunners: Bob Schooley; Mark McCorkle
- Directed by: Chris Bailey (season 1); Dave Block (season 2); Nicholas Filippi ("Ron Millionaire"); Steve Loter (seasons 2-4)
- Voices of: Christy Carlson Romano; Will Friedle; John DiMaggio; Nicole Sullivan; Nancy Cartwright; Tahj Mowry
- Theme music composer: Cory Lerios; George Gabriel
- Opening theme: "Call Me, Beep Me!" performed by Christina Milian
- Ending theme: "Call Me, Beep Me!" (instrumental)
- Composer: Adam Berry
- Country of origin: United States
- Original language: English
- No. of seasons: 4
- No. of episodes: 87 (92 segments) (list of episodes)

Production
- Executive producers: Bob Schooley; Mark McCorkle; Chris Bailey (season 1)
- Running time: 22 minutes
- Production company: Disney Television Animation

Original release
- Network: Disney Channel
- Release: June 7, 2002 – September 7, 2007

Kim Possible is an American animated action comedy television series created by Bob Schooley and Mark McCorkle for Disney Channel. Its titular protagonist is a teenage girl tasked with saving the world on a regular basis while coping with everyday issues commonly associated with adolescence. Kim is aided by her clumsy best friend, Ron Stoppable, his pet naked mole rat Rufus and ten-year-old computer genius Wade. Known collectively as Team Possible, Kim and Ron's missions primarily require them to thwart the evil plans of the mad scientist–supervillain duo Dr. Drakken and his sidekick Shego.

Veteran Disney Channel writers Schooley and McCorkle were recruited by the network to develop an animated series that could attract both older and younger audiences, and conceived Kim Possible as a show about a talented action heroine and her less competent sidekick. Inspired by the scarcity of female-led animated series at the time, Kim Possible is based on the creators' own high school experiences, and combines elements of action, adventure, drama, romance and comedy to appeal to both girls and boys while parodying the James Bond franchise and spy and superhero films. Distinct from other Disney Channel shows in its use of self-referential humor, Schooley and McCorkle developed fast-paced sitcom-style dialogue in order to cater to adult viewers. Set in the fictional town of Middleton, the show's setting and locations exhibit a retro-influenced aesthetic.

Kim Possible is the second original animated series, after The Proud Family, to air exclusively on Disney Channel, as well as the second show on the network to be produced by Walt Disney Television Animation as an original series. It also became the first Disney Channel animated series to be produced in high-definition. The series premiered on June 7, 2002, and ended on September 7, 2007, after 87 episodes and four seasons. Kim Possible received critical acclaim, becoming one of Disney's top-rated and most popular series. During its run, a pair of made-for-TV films were made: A Sitch in Time (2003) and So the Drama (2005). Merchandising based on the series, such as home media releases, toys, and video games were also made. A live-action television film of the same name was released in 2019.

== Premise ==
Promotional artwork for "Crush", the series' pilot, featuring (counter-clockwise from upper left) Shego (in green), Ron, Kim, Rufus, and Dr. Drakken (upper-right, in blue)

Kim Possible takes place primarily within the town of Middleton, USA and focuses on the life and adventures of Kim Possible, an accomplished high school student who fights crime on a regular basis, assisted by her best friend and sidekick Ron Stoppable and Rufus, his pet naked mole rat. Ron's personal fears, insecurities, and clumsiness tend to jeopardize the success of their own missions. Kim and Ron are aided remotely by Wade, a teenage computer genius who seldom leaves his bedroom and communicates with the duo via a device he invented himself known as a Kimmunicator. Together, the foursome is known as Team Possible. The majority of Kim's missions involve her traveling to various destinations around the world to rescue citizens from harm and fight a variety of villains, the most frequent of whom are Dr. Drakken, a mad scientist constantly plotting world domination, and his superpowered sidekick Shego, who possesses the ability to generate powerful energy blasts and emit them from her hands, making her the heroine's most dangerous opponent. Not yet of age to drive herself to most of her missions, Kim often relies on favors from various people she has assisted in the past for transportation.

Attending Middleton High School alongside Ron, her best female friend Monique and rival classmate Bonnie Rockwaller, Kim lives with her family: father James, a rocket scientist, and Ann, a brain surgeon, as well as her younger brothers, identical twins Jim and Tim, both of whom possess genius-level intellect. Fully aware of their daughter's occupation, Kim's parents remain completely supportive of her crime-fighting endeavors so long as she continues to obey curfew, but tend to be more-so concerned about the character's performance in school, as well as her love life. Lacking a secret identity, Kim is world famous and her profession is constantly acknowledged by both her classmates and teachers. Kim Possible also explores the highs and lows of Kim's life as a high school student attempting to navigate dating, captaining her high school's cheerleading squad, academics, sports, homework, exams and eventually learning to drive, all the while striving to maintain a healthy work–life balance; fighting crime typically comes to Kim more naturally than the more standard components of adolescence.

As revealed in Kim Possible: A Sitch in Time, Kim became involved in crime-fighting rather unintentionally. In a series of events prior to the beginning of the series, a pre-adolescent Kim, in search of a job, creates her own website, kimpossible.com, to promote her burgeoning babysitting and lawn mowing services, promoting it using the slogan "I can do anything". When he becomes trapped by his own laser security system, a billionaire accidentally contacts Kim while he was attempting to reach Team Impossible, to whose aid she immediately rushes. As news of the character's heroism spreads, her website is soon flooded with e-mails from around the globe requesting her assistance, and Kim ultimately decides to use her talents to help the world, becoming a superhero, even without superpowers.

== Episodes ==
Season	Episodes	Originally released	
Season	Episodes	First released	Last released
1	21	June 7, 2002	May 16, 2003
2	30 (Note: 33 segments; episodes 6, 12 and 25 all contain two 11 minute segments; "Rufus in Show / Adventures in Rufus-Sitting", "Rufus vs. Commodore Puddles / Day of the Snowmen" and "Sick Day / The Truth Hurts")	July 18, 2003	August 5, 2004
3	14 (Note: 15 segments; episode 7 contains two 11 minute segments; "Overdue / Roachie")	September 25, 2004	June 10, 2006
Crossover		August 26, 2005	
4	22 (Note: 23 segments; episode 19 contains two 11 minute segments; "Chasing Rufus / Nursery Crimes")	February 10, 2007	September 7, 2007

=== Lilo & Stitch crossover ===
A crossover episode of Lilo & Stitch: The Series and Kim Possible aired on August 26, 2005 as part of the former show's second season. Entitled "Rufus", Season 2, episode 20 features Lilo contacting Kim and Ron to help her rescue Stitch, who has been captured by Drakken and Shego in a partnership with Dr. Hamsterviel to clone Stitch for an army of obedient monsters. Meanwhile, Jumba mistakes Rufus for one of his missing experiments.

== Characters ==
- Kimberly Ann "Kim" Possible (voiced by Christy Carlson Romano): a confident and adventurous high school student who moonlights as a crime-fighter, dividing much of her time between saving the world and attending cheerleading practice. Although protecting the world comes to her quite naturally, Kim finds being a teenager much more challenging, struggling with issues that range from schoolwork to bullying, embarrassment, relationships, and self-doubt, continuing to become flustered around boys she likes despite her multiple talents and heroics. A straight-A student, Kim is also a perfectionist. Kim's catchphrases include "No big", "So not the drama", and "What's the sitch?", short for "situation". Combined, her first and last names are a pun of the word "impossible".
- Ronald "Ron" Stoppable (voiced by Will Friedle): Kim's sidekick; her childhood best friend later love interest who, unlike Kim, is cowardly, socially awkward, clumsy and (up until the final season) unpopular with his peers. Although Ron is far less competent within the realm of crime-fighting than Kim, he has proven his merit as a teammate on multiple occasions by gradually maturing and gaining confidence over the course of the series. Known for his catchphrase "Booyah", Ron has a fear of monkeys and serves as the show's comic relief. His first and last names are a pun of the word "unstoppable".
- Rufus (voiced by Nancy Cartwright): Ron's pet naked mole rat who accompanies Kim and Ron on their missions, traveling in his owner's pocket.
- Wade Load (voiced by Tahj Mowry): a teenage computer genius who informs Kim and Ron about upcoming missions from his bedroom, remotely assisting, guiding and equipping them with useful gadgets, especially Kim's Kimmunicator, via which is an Apple Newton-like PDA he communicates and provides his teammates with vital information, and a red hair dryer grappling hook. Wade is also responsible for maintaining Kim's website.
- Dr. Drakken (voiced by John DiMaggio): born Drew Theodore P. Lipsky, Drakken is Kim's archnemesis and most resilient adversary. He is a mad scientist plotting world domination, although most of his schemes fail at the hands of Kim because he lacks both the patience and intelligence to perfect his ideas, which often suffer as a result of his own mistakes and oversights. His skin has permanently been turned blue as a result of a laboratory accident. Additionally, Drakken is a former college roommate of Kim's father James.
- Shego (voiced by Nicole Sullivan): Kim's primary combatant and most dangerous opponent; a supervillain with the superhuman ability to generate powerful green energy blasts from her hands. Shego is Drakken's sarcastic – but far more intelligent – sidekick, who openly mocks the scientist with little regard for his seniority. The character finds herself making up for Drakken's incompetence on multiple occasions. Originally the lone female member of a team of superheroes known as Team Go alongside her four brothers, Shego eventually makes a full conversion to villainy after ultimately growing attracted to the evil she once fought against (in addition to finding her brothers annoying). Smart, athletic, and attractive, Shego is essentially a "dark reflection" of Kim, as well as the only character the heroine truly has reason to fear, although the two archrivals share a mutual respect for each other at the same time.

Some episodes revolve around characters other than Kim and Ron, particularly villains, who have been provided with nearly as much back story as the heroes. Other significant recurring characters include Kim's parents, Drs. James and Ann Possible (Gary Cole and Jean Smart, respectively), and her younger brothers, twin geniuses Jim and Tim (Shaun Fleming, 2002–06; Spencer Fox, 2007), to whom she refers as "Tweebs" (a portmanteau of "twin" and "dweebs"); the twins speak their own made up language known as "Twinnish". Kim shares a bitter rivalry with fellow cheerleader Bonnie Rockwaller (Kirsten Storms), who, unlike Kim, is arrogant and has a tendency to be mean when angry – her "polar opposite", which represents the kind of person Kim could have been if not for her humility. Kim's best female friend is Monique (Raven-Symoné), who is Kim and Ron's classmate and is occasionally forced into accompanying Kim on select missions when Ron is unavailable. With her fashion and pop culture expertise, Monique bridges the worlds between Kim's high school and crime-fighting lives, also serving as something of a guidance counselor. Although Drakken and Shego are Kim and Ron's most frequent opponents, the characters also battle a diverse cast of other villains, namely Monkey Fist (Tom Kane), a British nobleman with surgically implanted monkey hands and feet who seeks mystical power, and Ron's nemesis due to his fear of monkeys; Scottish golfer Duff Killigan (Brian George); father-son billionaires Señor Senior, Sr. and Señor Senior, Jr. (Ricardo Montalbán/Earl Boen; Néstor Carbonell), who take up villainy as a hobby out of boredom; and Professor Dementor (Patton Oswalt), a German mad scientist and Drakken's more successful rival.

== Production ==
=== Conception and main characters ===
Long-time collaborators and veteran Disney writers, Bob Schooley and Mark McCorkle had already been writing for Walt Disney Television Animation and Disney Channel for several years, contributing to the network's male-led animated series Aladdin, Hercules and Buzz Lightyear of Star Command, each one spin-offs of their respective feature-length animated films. Although they had enjoyed working on those projects, Schooley and McCorkle were becoming interested in contributing to "something original". At the same time, the writers learned that David Stainton, the head of Walt Disney Television Animation, had become interested in developing a show featuring ordinary children in extraordinary circumstances for Disney Channel. Stainton and network executives Gary Marsh and Anne Sweeney commissioned Schooley and McCorkle to create an animated series for 6- to 14-year-olds with cross-generational appeal. While traveling in an elevator on their way back to their office from their lunch break, McCorkle said to Schooley, "Kim Possible. She can do anything", to which Schooley responded, "Ron Stoppable, he can't", and nearly the entire premise of Kim Possible naturally unfolded thereafter. According to Schooley and McCorkle, both lead characters' names indicate that Kim Possible "is going to be an arched show that is a little bit over the top, but also that the girl is going to be the action lead and the guy is going to be funny". Conceiving all main characters themselves, Rufus and Wade were eventually created and added to the roster, but the series essentially remains about Kim "who is incredibly competent in the action world but challenged in the real world" while "Ron would be challenged everywhere".

With its main duo finally established, Kim Possible became the easiest show Schooley and McCorkle had ever developed. One of Disney Channel's earliest forays into developing an entirely original animated series "from scratch", Kim Possible was born out of the creators' realization that there were few animated series starring strong female characters at the time and created Kim as "a character that ... girls can look up to", inspired by their own young daughters. The creators were also influenced by their own childhood heroes James Bond and Captain Kirk from Star Trek, and wanted Kim to resemble a character their daughters could idolize similarly. Despite being a "strong female role model", Schooley maintained that heroism "doesn't help [Kim] a bit when she comes face-to-face with her latest school crush". Unlike traditional superheroes, Kim is entirely devoid of both superpowers and a secret identity; the creators avoided making the character "impervious" like most comic book superheroes tend to be because they wanted both her and Ron to remain relatable to younger viewers. Working completely independently from government spy organizations, Kim's crime-fighting abilities are drawn from real-life activities such as cheerleading and gymnastics, "something that any kid...in the world could do", according to the creators.

=== Casting ===
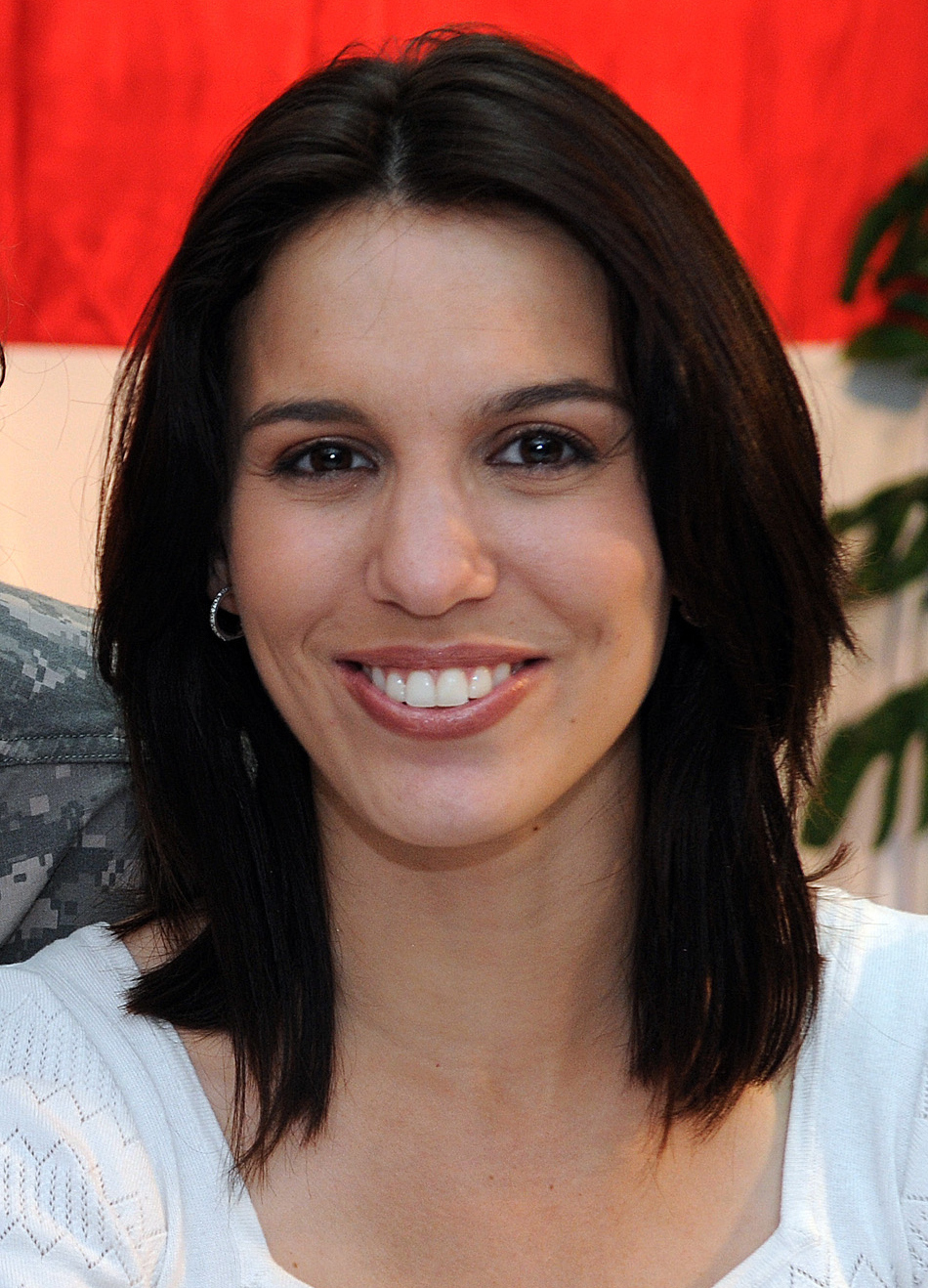
Christy Carlson Romano, voice of Kim Possible

Much of Kim Possible's cast consists of Disney Channel and ABC alumnae, as well as actors known for their roles on other popular animated and comedy series. After auditioning several actresses to voice the title character, then-16 year-old Christy Carlson Romano was finally cast as Kim after first being introduced to Schooley and McCorkle by Disney Channel executives. Romano had already been well known to Disney Channel audiences for her portrayal of Ren Stevens on the series Even Stevens, and began voicing Kim while completing her stint on the show. Her first voice acting role, Romano immediately identified with her character because both were "dealing with teenage issues" at the same time, comparing Kim's challenge of battling both her personal life and villains to herself balancing schoolwork with her budding acting career; the actress was forced to forfeit her own senior prom due to Kim Possible commitments. Describing her character as "very ambitious, very skilled, very smart," Romano told The New York Times "I've tried to make her a good role model. Her confidence and her sincerity really shine through." One episode in particular, "Blush", was inspired by Romano's modesty and tendency to blush at the slightest compliment. Romano's performance as Kim was nominated for an Emmy Award. Recognized for his ability to play "over-the-top characters", Will Friedle, best remembered for his performance as Eric Matthews on the sitcom Boy Meets World, was cast as Ron. Actor Neil Patrick Harris had auditioned for the role, as did actor John Cena before he decided to pursue a professional wrestling career. Schooley attributes much of the show's success to Romano and Friedle's chemistry, explaining, "they add something to this that makes it more than a typical gag-oriented cartoon."

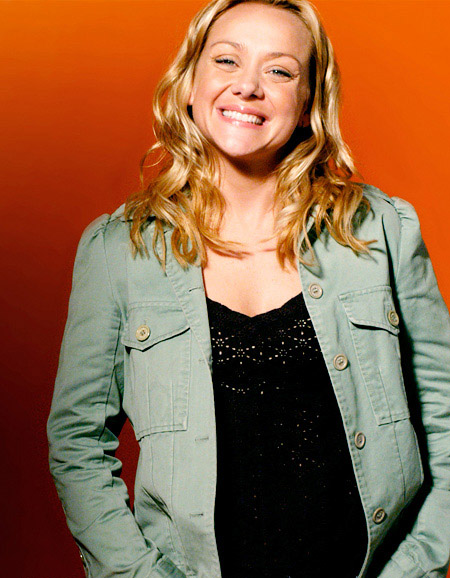
The role of Shego was created for Nicole Sullivan, with whom Schooley and McCorkle had previously worked.

To prepare herself for the role of Rufus, Nancy Cartwright, best known for her long-running voice work as Bart Simpson on The Simpsons, researched naked mole rats extensively to the point of which she became "a font of useless trivia" and knowledge. Cartwright cites Rufus among her two most difficult characters to voice due to the constant use of her diaphragm required to produce 18 mole rat sound effects. Her performance earned her a Daytime Emmy Award nomination for Outstanding Performer in an Animated Program. John DiMaggio was cast as Drakken based on his vocal performance as Bender on the animated sitcom Futurama. The creators mused, "Drakken is as funny as he is because of how funny John is. Like any of the great voiceover guys, he can do multiple voices. He also just has a terrific comedic sense", while director and animator Steve Loter described both Friedle and DiMaggio as "experts in ad-libbing." DiMaggio took inspiration for Drakken's voice and mannerisms from Harvey Korman's performance as Hedley Lamarr in Blazing Saddles.Schooley and McCorkle had previously worked with Nicole Sullivan on Buzz Lightyear of Star Command and thus created the role of Shego with her in mind. Sullivan's first recording session opposite DiMaggio established a chemistry between the two voice actors and their respective characters, out of which Shego's signature sarcasm was introduced and eventually expanded upon. During the show's inaugural season, the actors generally recorded separate from each other, but Friedle, DiMaggio and Sullivan experienced opportunities to record together during the second season. Having been attending high school in New York at the time, Romano would mostly work remotely and usually be "phone patched in" whenever necessary; there is only one occasion during which the entire main cast recorded together.

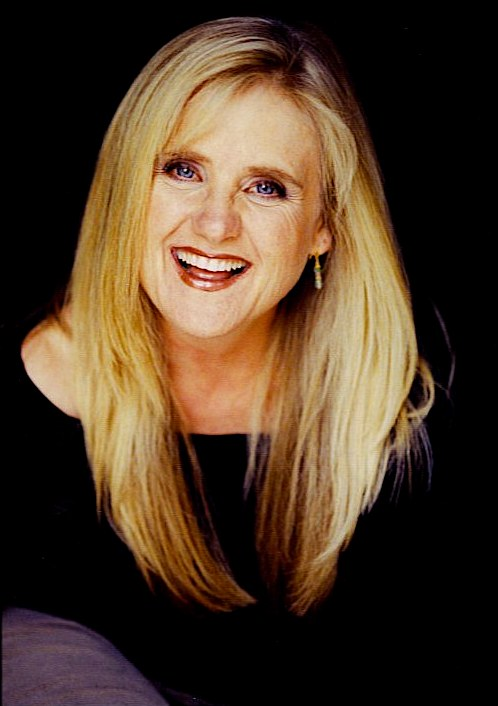
The Simpsons' Nancy Cartwright, voice of Rufus

Tahj Mowry, who plays T.J. Henderson on the sitcom Smart Guy, voices Wade. In terms of recurring and guest roles, Designing Women's Jean Smart voices Kim's mother Ann. Kirsten Storms voiced Kim's high school rival Bonnie while portraying Belle on the soap opera Days of Our Lives. Prior to Kim Possible, Storms had starred in Disney Channel's Zenon film series. That's So Raven's Raven-Symoné voices Kim's female best friend Monique, cast based on her reputation as a comedic actress and ability to deliver a punchline. Señor Senior, Sr. and Señor Senior, Jr. are voiced by Ricardo Montalban and Nestor Carbonell, respectively. Friedle's Boy Meets World co-star Rider Strong voices Brick Flag, Bonnie's boyfriend. Ashley Tisdale of Disney Channel's High School Musical film series and sitcom The Suite Life of Zack & Cody was offered the role of Season 4 villain Camille Leon. That's So Raven's Anneliese van der Pol voiced a guest role in the episode "And The Mole Rat Will Be CGI" as Heather, an actress hired to play Kim in a film adaptation of her life, serving as her first voice-acting role. Loter had always been interested in working with the cast of the television series Buffy the Vampire Slayer but this idea never came to fruition; one particularly famous actor refused a villainous guest role in Season 4 because he was insulted to have been asked to voice an animated character on a television series.

=== Writing ===
Serving as executive producers in addition to writers throughout the entire series, Schooley and McCorkle oversaw the show for its entire duration to maintain consistency. As executive producers, Schooley and McCorkle were mostly involved in the writing process, focusing mainly on plot and dialogue, while storyboarding was chiefly handled by Loter. The writing staff consisted of both Disney Channel employees and freelance writers. Much of the series is based on both Schooley and McCorkle's own experiences growing up as teenagers in high school, as well as the lives of both creators' daughters. Although essentially a comedy series, Schooley and McCorkle also combined elements of adventure, relationships, and humor in order to appeal to both boys, who are primarily interested in action, and girls, who are more-so attracted to relationships and character development, aware of "ancient truisms" surrounding the belief that boys are generally less likely to watch a series starring a female lead, while girls seldom exhibit such reservations when the casting situation is reversed. Without alienating younger viewers, to whom the show refuses to "talk down", the writing in Kim Possible is "a little older than" that of traditional Disney animated series. While avoiding adult references, Schooley and McCorkle opted for a fast-paced sitcom-style dialogue and rhythm that attracted adult viewers instead, ultimately resulting in teleplays that were typically five pages longer than traditional Disney Channel scripts. Additionally, the show heavily parodies the popular James Bond films. Kim Possible's showrunners were heavily influenced by Marvel Comics, particularly the Spider-Man, Fantastic Four, and X-Men comic book series. One particularly strong influence is found in Dr. Drakken and James Possible's former friendship, whose relationship closely mirrors that of the Fantastic Four's Victor von Doom/Doctor Doom and Reed Richards/Mr. Fantastic, respectively.

=== Design and animation ===
Creating the Kim Possible universe and environment was very much a collaborative process between Schooley and McCorkle, Disney Channel, the character designers, and the cast, who were also encouraged to contribute their own ideas. Although Schooley and McCorkle participated in designing Kim, the majority of that particular task was the combined efforts of Loter, inaugural season director Chris Bailey, art director Alan Bodner and character designer Stephen Silver, each of whom had worked together on previous animated projects. Due to their extensive animation experience, Schooley and McCorkle were aware that "Kim had to be an appealing character", while Ron would be more-so "goofy-appealing". Evolving dramatically over the course of three months, Kim, who had originally been designed to resemble a "standard" athletic-looking blonde heroine, underwent several changes. At one point, the character's appearance was based on that of video game character Lara Croft from the Tomb Raider franchise until Disney Channel abandoned this concept in favor of one more akin to that of a 14-year-old girl as opposed to a bombshell. Admitting that Kim would have been their dream girl in high school, the creators joked, "She would have been way out of our class though." A super suit designed for the character was introduced in early Season 4 but quickly abandoned once the writers realized that the costume would detract from the character's established "she can do anything" reputation. However, her original mission outfit consisting of a crop top and cargo pants is permanently replaced by a T-shirt and pants. Meanwhile, the outfits of Team Impossible were influenced by the X-Men's "classic" blue and gold uniforms.

Loter typically visualized whatever script he was provided with after they had been written. With characters drawn with large heads and eyes, the show's art style was based on Disneyland posters from the 1950s and 1960s. Common Sense Media reviewed that the show's colorful, "hip and retro" style is reminiscent of "campy" spy films released during the 1960s and 1970s. The New York Times observed that the show's retro setting is more similar to that of The Jetsons than The Simpsons. Using a limited animation style, the characters wear a wide variety of costumes and hairstyles. Opting for a "simplicity that was the hallmark of" the 1960s, some of the architecture in Kim Possible is reminiscent of lairs owned by James Bond villains, specifically SPECTRE's volcanic lair in You Only Live Twice, the Rumpus Room in Goldfinger, and the Liparius supertanker in The Spy Who Loved Me, as well as the Men in Black: Alien Attack attraction in Universal Studios Florida, while Bodner was inspired by the graphic design of posters Disney used for its Disneyland attractions during the same decade, as well as Chuck Jones and Maurice Noble. In Season 4, some episodes were intentionally filmed in multiplane to achieve a more cinematic image. Additionally, Disney Channel's animated series American Dragon: Jake Long inspired the animators and artists to approach Kim Possible's final season with an "edgier" design. Director Steve Loter declared that Season 4 was the "most international season" because Kim and Ron travel to more exotic countries.

Four different animation studios animated the series: Rough Draft Korea, Starburst Animation Studios, Toon City and Hanho Heung-Up Co., Ltd.

=== Music ===
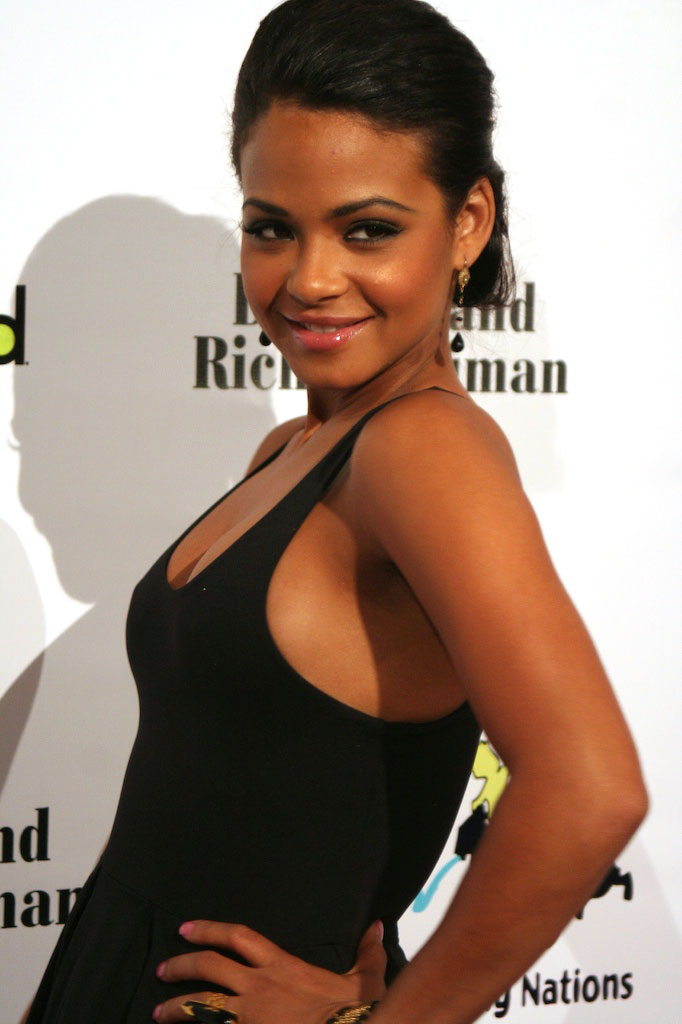
R&B singer Christina Milian recorded the show's theme song "Call Me, Beep Me", which she also credits with benefiting her own career as a recording artist.

Written by musicians Cory Lerios and George Gabriel, the show's theme song "Call Me, Beep Me" (also known as "Call Me, Beep Me! (The Kim Possible Song)" or simply "The Kim Possible Song") is performed by American recording artist Christina Milian. Having already been working for Disney Channel at the time, appearing as a correspondent on the network's miniseries Movie Surfers after declining an offer to appear on their variety show The Mickey Mouse Club, Milian learned about Kim Possible from Disney when the studio called her in recruitment of an artist to record the new show's theme song. After meeting with the songwriters, who then proceeded to write the song, for the first time, Milian returned to the studio to record "Call Me, Beep Me" one week later. Romano also contributed vocals to the song. Described as a Motown-influenced R&B and teen pop track, "Call Me, Beep Me" is heard during the show's opening title sequence, encouraging viewers and listeners to contact Kim for assistance should they ever find themselves in difficult situations, featuring the lyrics "Danger or trouble, I'm there on the double." The sounds of mobile devices and modern-day technology are incorporated throughout the song. Although "Call Me, Beep Me" begins "I'm your basic, average girl" in reference to Kim, these lyrics are paradoxical because there is little basic or average about its protagonist. A music video was released for "Call Me, Beep Me", which features Milian and Romano recording the song in the recording studio interspersed with short scenes from the series.

"Call Me, Beep Me" (2002)
Theme song "Call Me, Beep Me", written by Cory Lerios and George Gabriel, and performed by recording artist Christina Milian. The song is a teen pop and R&B number about Kim Possible's devotion to helping those in need.

"Call Me, Beep Me" became a Radio Disney hit, remaining at number one for 12 weeks. The song's success ultimately benefited Milian's career as a performer; she explained, "I never realized that show would give me so much exposure. It's great because people have grown with me, even with that damn song. Didn't know so many people were watching Kim Possible like that. Because of that song, it actually inspired me to do my own musical animated artist because a lot of people thought I was Kim Possible." Milian has yet to perform the song live in concert but has expressed interest in recording a remix for fans. "Call Me, Beep Me" was the first song Lerios and Gabriel wrote together, and the songwriting duo has since gone on to collaborate on both scoring and writing songs for several other major television networks and programs. "Call Me, Beep Me" became so popular among fans of both the show that several of them proceeded to download it as their own cell phone ringtones, including Milian herself.

Composer Adam Berry was responsible for scoring the entire series. Berry was also responsible for creating music for the first three seasons of Comedy Central's South Park. While the music in Kim Possible is mostly guitar-driven, Berry's scoring experience prior to the show had been exclusively orchestral, composing scores using only a keyboard. A guitarist since the age of six, Berry himself provided all the guitar and bass musical cues in Kim Possible. Although discussing whether or not popular music featured in the series should be stylistically similar to the score, Disney decided to avoid limiting the show to then-current musical trends because, according to Berry, "trying to be current is one of the best ways to sound dated." While themes of electronic music are heard during the scene's fight sequences, guitar riffs of "Call Me, Beep Me" are reprised throughout episodes. Smash Mouth lead singer Steve Harwell made a guest appearance in the Season 2 episode "Queen BeBe" in December 2003. The third season introduced several character-specific songs. The title sequence was almost entirely updated with the premiere of the fourth season, though "Call Me, Beep Me" remained unchanged.

An official Kim Possible soundtrack was released by Walt Disney Records on July 1, 2003, featuring "Call Me, Beep Me" and "Could it Be", in addition to other musical contributions from the cast of Kim Possible in addition to various Disney recording artists, including Aaron Carter. Romano also recorded a new song entitled "Say the Word" for the album. A combination of teen pop, pop rock, power pop and R&B music, the soundtrack also features appearances by musical groups A-Teens, Jump5 (performing a cover of Kool & the Gang's "Celebration"), LMNT and Smash Mouth, and Will Friedle and Nancy Cartwright's "Naked Mole Rap", a rapped tribute to Ron's pet Rufus, ultimately concluding with a "work-you-up remix" of the theme song by Tony Phillip. Aimed primarily at the show's young fan base, AllMusic writer Heather Phares reviewed the album as "a better than average children's soundtrack."

== Styles and themes ==
Episodes typically adhere to a simple, similar format, featuring a power-hungry villain who Kim and Ron must somehow prevent from taking over the world. Although primarily an action comedy TV series, Music in Television: Channels of Listening author James Deaville observed that Kim Possible adheres to the long-standing tradition of combining adventure with comedy in animated television. According to Telebisyon, "The show is fairly action-oriented, but also has a strong, light-hearted comedic atmosphere". In addition to action, comedy and adventure, Kim Possible's storylines also explore elements of romance and drama. According to The Artifice, the show's unique brand of humor distinguishes it from the slapstick style associated with most Disney Channel sitcoms, namely Phil of the Future and That's so Raven, although Ron can be considered a slapstick character. The villains are also depicted as clever, yet comical. With a tendency not to take itself seriously, Kim Possible both parodies and pays homage to the spy, action and superhero genres, its comedy benefiting from the show's emphasis on "over-the-top plots" and circumstances. Shego's own family of superheroes, Team Go, is a deliberate parody of the Marvel superhero team the Fantastic Four; the series also references the Tomb Raider and Mission: Impossible film franchises. Self-referential in its humor that avoids talking down to viewers, the series additionally parodies the teen sitcom genre, teenage fads and trends in general, and sometimes makes fun of its own plot holes and oversights, while occasionally adopting common cartoon and sitcom tropes.

In addition to other "mainstays" of modern-day youth, technology serves an important role throughout the series, specifically the Internet and Kim's gadgets, the most significant of which is the Kimmunicator designed to help Kim communicate with Wade and grants her access to virtually any information she desires. McCorkle elaborated on the show's emphasis on technology: "Using the Internet theme in the series became an easy launching pad partially because it is such a major part of the fabric of teen life and the interactive possibilities are endless ... It's as though we get to play James Bond's 'Q' for each episode -- the more imaginative the toy, the better." Particularly desirable to younger viewers, technology enables Kim to travel around the world effortlessly and, to some extent, mirrors children's ability to speak to anyone in the world via the Internet. Kim's ability to travel virtually anywhere around the world within a short period of time is left largely unexplained; BuzzFeed referred to Wade as an "example that sitting in front of your computer all day is actually the most powerful position to be in." The fact that Wade never leaves his bedroom could potentially indicate that he has agoraphobia.

Hosting a diverse cast of strong female characters while confronting gender norms and barriers, Kim Possible explores feminist themes, specifically third-wave feminism. Alongside several other female-led animated series that premiered throughout the decade, which had been experiencing a steady influx in media starring "Teenage Action Chicks with special powers", Kim Possible is considered to be an example of both girl power and power feminism. Similar to the animated shows Totally Spies, Atomic Betty, and The Life and Times of Juniper Lee, Kim Possible revolves around an attractive, intelligent, and strong female character whose public identity is meant to indicate that she should be received as a positive role models for young girls. According to Betsy Wallace of Common Sense Media, Kim Possible "capitalizes on the female villain-fighting craze that sparked with Buffy the Vampire Slayer and Alias", albeit simplifying the genre for a younger generation. Agreeing that the series adopted the then-new "crime-fighting female" formula, Tracey McLoone of PopMatters admitted that Buffy the Vampire Slayer, Alias and The Powerpuff Girls comparisons are inevitable, but at the same time observed that Kim is more confident than her predecessors, incorporating cheerleading and acrobatics into her fights against enemies, while using traditionally "girly" accessories such as lip gloss and makeup to her advantage in battle. In comparison to Buffy, Kim also approaches her complicated lifestyle more joyfully. Meanwhile, Nicole Rogers of the Wisconsin State Journal believes that Kim resembles what Sydney Bristow of Alias would be like had she been depicted as an animated high school student.

== Broadcast ==
Produced by Walt Disney Television Animation, Kim Possible's episodes are typically 22 minutes in length and occupy half-hour time slots. Season 1 included a total of 21 episodes and was initially scheduled to premiere in January 2002. The first episode, "Crush", premiered on Disney Channel on June 7, 2002, followed by the airing of two back-to-back episodes, occupying the 6:30 pm to 8:00 pm time slot. In total, three half-hour episodes premiered back-to-back. Following its premiere, Disney Channel aired one new episode of the series Friday nights at 6:30 pm, followed by rebroadcasts at the same time on Saturday and Sunday nights. By 2005, the show's time slot had been changed to Friday evenings at 5:30 pm. Episodes were also broadcast in syndication on several Disney-affiliated television networks including Toon Disney, weekdays at 7:30 am and weekends at 3:00 pm and 4:00 pm, and ABC's ABC Kids Saturday mornings at 11:00 am, ultimately becoming the "lynchpin" of that particular segment. In mid 2006, the series started airing on Disney Channel's website. Internationally, Kim Possible aired on the Family Channel in Canada, while broadcasting on CCTV 12 in China, Dubai TV in Dubai in their respective local languages, Mandarin and Arabic and on ABS-CBN in the Philippines in Filipino language.

Typically, series that originate on Disney Channel seldom surpass three seasons (65 episodes) before they are canceled, a rule that had been practiced since the late 1990s. In 2005, production halted following the premiere of Kim Possible Movie: So the Drama after airing three seasons and 65 episodes. However, the success of So the Drama bolstered the show's popularity overseas and ultimately encouraged Disney Channel executives to renew the series for a fourth and final season. On November 29, 2005, Disney Channel ordered 22 new episodes of Kim Possible in response to the series' success and popular demand from fans, who had been heavily petitioning for the show's renewal online and via e-mail. One of only a handful of television series revived by cult following, Kim Possible was the first Disney Channel Original Series to air more than 65 episodes; its order to produce 22 new episodes as opposed to the usual 13 to 18 was also unprecedented for a revived program. After a year-long hiatus, Season 4 initially premiered exclusively on Disney Channel's website before finally returning to the network on February 10, 2007, prior to which an image of a watch-sized rendition of the Kimmunicator had been leaked online. Originally, the episodes were not aired in chronological order, a decision Loter detested. After running five years, four seasons and 81 episodes (87 including the films), the hour-long series finale, "Graduation", aired on September 7, 2007, ending Kim Possible.

Kim Possible aired weekdays on Disney XD in the United States. When the series returned to Disney XD in February 2014, fans flocked to Twitter to voice their approval. The series also airs on Disney-affiliated channels around the world in countries such as the United Kingdom, Australia, India, South Africa, and several Eastern European countries. On May 2, 2016, the series began airing on Disney's Freeform network as part of the late-night That's So Throwback block. The series began airing on Disney XD in 2018, though only including random episodes from Seasons 1 and 4. Eventually, the reruns shifted to include episodes from all four seasons, still out of order, beginning with reruns aired beginning and after July 30, 2018 until August 2018. In addition to maintaining consistently high ratings throughout its four-season run, Kim Possible was the longest-running Disney Channel Original Series until it was surpassed by Phineas and Ferb in 2012. The show can now be found on Disney+.

=== Home media ===
Kim Possible home media releases
Season		Episodes	Releases			
Season		Episodes	DVD			Digital purchase
Season		Episodes	United States	United Kingdom	Australia	United States
1	2002–03	21	The Secret Files: September 2, 2003; Episode(s): "Crush" • "Downhill" • "Attack of the Killer Bebes" The Villain Files: December 7, 2004; Episode(s): "Animal Attraction" The Complete First Season: January 1, 2010; Episode(s): Entire season included The Classic Animated Series: February 3, 2019; Episode(s): "Crush" • "Downhill" • "Attack of the Killer Bebes" • "Animal Attraction"	Monkey Business: November 5, 2007; Episode(s): "Monkey Fist Strikes" • "Monkey Ninjas in Space"		Volume 1 Episode(s): "Crush" – "Coach Possible" Volume 2 Episode(s): "Pain King vs. Cleopatra" – "Low Budget"
2	2003–04	30	The Secret Files: September 2, 2003; Episode(s): "Partners" A Sitch in Time: November 28, 2003; Episode(s): "Present" – "Future" The Villain Files: December 7, 2004; Episode(s): "Number One" • "Blush" Disney Channel Holiday: October 31, 2005; Episode(s): "A Very Possible Christmas" The Complete Second Season: January 1, 2010; Episode(s): Entire season included The Classic Animated Series: February 3, 2019; Episode(s): "Number One" • "Present" " Future" • "Blush" • "Partners"	Monkey Business: November 5, 2007; Episode(s): "The Full Monkey"		Volume 3 Episode(s): "Naked Genius" – "Exchange" Volume 4 Episode(s): "Rufus vs. Commodore Puddles" / "Day of the Snowmen" – "The Full Monkey" Volume 5 Episode(s): "Blush" – "Rewriting History"
3	2004–06	14	The Villain Files: December 7, 2004; Episode(s): "Showdown at the Crooked D" So the Drama: May 10, 2005; Episode(s): "So the Drama" • "Gorilla Fist" The Classic Animated Series: February 3, 2019; Episode(s): "Showdown at the Crooked D" • "So the Drama" • "Gorilla Fist"	Monkey Business: November 5, 2007; Episode(s): "Gorilla Fist"		Volume 5 Episode(s): "Showdown at the Crooked D" Volume 6 Episode(s): "Steal Wheels" – "Bad Boy" • "Dimension Twist" • "Overdue" / "Roachie" – "And the Mole Rat Will Be CGI" So the Drama; Episode(s): "So the Drama"
4	2007	22	—N/a	—N/a	—N/a	Volume 7 Episode(s): "Ill Suited" – "Odds Man In" Volume 8 Episode(s): "Stop Team Go" – "Graduation"

== Reception ==
=== Critical response ===
In the days leading up to Kim Possible's premiere, television critics speculated whether or not the show would attract a large enough male audience despite its female lead to prove successful. Ultimately, Kim Possible premiered to both widespread acclaim and strong viewership. The first season currently holds a perfect 100% score on review aggregator Rotten Tomatoes. The series continued to garner critical acclaim throughout its run, earning particular praise for its dialogue, humor and animation, as well as appeal towards both younger and older viewers.

Describing the show as "infectious", Rob Owen of the Pittsburgh Post-Gazette wrote, "Blessed with a modern sense of humor and hip -- but not too hip -- vocabulary, Kim Possible should appeal to the tweens ... it clearly targets", believing that its animation, "speed with which stories unfold and especially the dialogue makes Kim Possible an early summer TV treat." Writing for The New York Times, television critic Julie Salamon enjoyed Rufus' role, penning, "I probably would have liked Kim Impossible even if one of its lead characters hadn't been a naked mole rat. But the cheerful presence of Rufus ... in this new animated series from Disney signals that the show's executive producer and director, Chris Bailey, doesn't mind getting cute in obvious ways." Similarly, USA Today's Alex Kane wrote that the show "is ultimately made memorable by its charming cast of characters, including a naked mole rat named Rufus". In his book The Complete Directory to Prime Time Network and Cable TV Shows, 1946-Present, television historian Tim Brooks appreciated the show's "marvelous sense of humor about itself." Ted Cox of Daily Herald stated that the "good things about [the show] outweighs the bad" and welcomed the show as a change to the "male cartoon dominance". Evan Levine of Newspaper Enterprise Association stated that the show has a "nice mix of humor and adventure", praising the humor as "genuinely funny moments that parody everything from adventure movies to family relationships."

Scott D. Pierce of the Deseret News praised Kim Possible for being "an entertaining show that should indeed appeal to tweens, younger kids and even their parents" that "plays with the superhero format in a way that doesn't take itself too seriously but doesn't play down to the viewers." Tracy McLoone of PopMatters reviewed, "Kim Possible includes adult-friendly humor, in the event that parents feel the need to watch tv (sic) with their kids. But nobody in or watching the series will ever be offended or over-stimulated, or even surprised." While accepting Kim as a positive role model and admitting that the series teaches "good lessons" at times, Besty Wallace of Common Sense Media expressed concern over the show's violent action sequences, explaining, "lessons may get muddled and nearly lost as the heroes shimmy up rope ladders dangling from helicopters and dodge spinning tops of doom." Wallace concluded, "As long as you're not expecting too much in the way of educational value, you'll probably have plenty of fun with this one." Writing for Bustle, Sarah Freymiller opined, "Ultimately, Kim Possible was just a solid show" that "didn't skimp on plot or dialogue in favor of Wile E. Coyote explosions, and its tongue-in-cheek humor allowed it to be self-aware and hip at the same time."

Conversely, Girlfighting: Betrayal and Rejection Among Girls author Lyn Mikel Brown was less receptive towards Kim herself, criticizing the show for promoting the beautiful and thin heroine as "your basic average girl" and apparent reliance on Ron's intelligence, as well as the fact that her "biggest threat" is Bonnie as opposed to evil. According to Brown, "Being the kind of girl who's accepted or befriended by boys underscores a girl's power and sets her against other girls."

=== Ratings ===
Kim Possible's premiere received a 2.2 Nielsen rating, totaling 1.8 million households and 2.5 million viewers. At the time, the series had the highest-rated premiere of all the Disney Channel shows. It also became the first Disney Channel series to debut at No. 1 in the US and the top-rated show among tweens 9 to 14, girls 6 to 14, and girls 9 to 14. In terms of ratings, Kim Possible continued to perform consistently well into its second and third seasons. By 2003, Kim Possible was Disney Channel's highest-rated animated series for kids 6 to 11 and tweens 9 to 14. In 2005, Richard Huff of New York Daily News confirmed that the series was a "huge hit" with both boys and girls. On March 26, 2007, Thomas R. Umstead of Multichannel News stated that Kim Possible is one of the shows that contributed to the viewership growth of Disney Channel for the past three years.

On April 8, 2005, the premiere of Kim Possible Movie: So the Drama was cable's top program of the date, receiving a 3.6 household rating (3.1 million viewers). Ratings remained strong into the final season. Internationally, the show proved particularly popular in Germany and Japan.

=== Awards and nominations ===
Year	Award	Category	Nominee	Result	Ref.
2002	30th Annie Awards	Best Animated Television Production	Kim Possible	Nominated	
2002	30th Annie Awards	Best Animated Television Production Produced For Children	Kim Possible	Nominated	
2002	30th Annie Awards	Production Design In An Animated Television Production	Alan Bodner	Nominated	
2003	55th Primetime Emmy Awards	Outstanding Animated Program	Chris Bailey, JK Kim, Marsh Lamore, Michel Lyman, Mark McCorkle, Bob Schooley, and Bob Treat for "Crush"	Nominated	
2003	2003 Kids' Choice Awards	Favorite Cartoon	Kim Possible	Nominated	
2004	31st Daytime Emmy Awards	Outstanding Children's Animated Program	Kim Possible	Nominated	
2004	31st Daytime Emmy Awards	Outstanding Performer in an Animated Program	Nancy Cartwright as "Rufus"	Nominated	
2005	32nd Daytime Emmy Awards	Outstanding Children's Animated Program	Bob Schooley, Mark McCorkle, Kurt Weldon, David Block, Steve Loter, Lisa Schaffer, Bill Motz, and Bob Roth	Nominated	
2005	32nd Daytime Emmy Awards	Outstanding Achievement in Music Direction And Composition	Adam Berry	Nominated	
2005	32nd Daytime Emmy Awards	Outstanding Performer In An Animated Program	Christy Carlson Romano as "Kim"	Nominated	
2005	32nd Daytime Emmy Awards	Outstanding Achievement in Sound Editing - Live Action and Animation	Paca Thomas and Robbi Smith	Nominated	
2005	32nd Daytime Emmy Awards	Outstanding Achievement in Sound Mixing - Live Action and Animation	Melissa Ellis and Fil Brown	Won	
2006	33rd Annie Awards	Production Design In A Television Production	Nadia Vurbenova for Kim Possible "So The Drama"	Nominated	
2006	33rd Annie Awards	Storyboarding In A Television Production	Dave Bullock for Kim Possible "So The Drama"	Nominated	
2006	33rd Annie Awards	Storyboarding In A Television Production	Troy Adomitis for Kim Possible "So The Drama"	Nominated	
2008	35th Annie Awards	Best Animated Television Production	Kim Possible	Nominated	

== Legacy ==
Kim Possible is considered to be one of Disney Channel's most beloved programs. Polygon writer Petrana Radulovic observed that the series "bears a weighty legacy" due to being "a staple of many childhoods ... Unlike many other action comedies at the time, Kim Possible centered around a capable heroine, and many boys and girls alike watched the show. Because it is such a beloved childhood show, the nostalgia value is high." One of Disney Channel's most popular and successful original shows, Kim Possible remains the project for which Schooley and McCorkle are best known. Few anticipated Kim Possible would become as successful as it ultimately did, proving popular among both male and female audiences. Explaining Kim Possible's universal appeal, the creators said, "Whenever there's an action complement to a show, boys get excited, and when Kim does her martial arts and when she's doing one of these incredible stunts, boys love to watch it ... And one of the things that we've always found is that boys of any age ... love humour and characters that are a little goofy, sort of silly and weird. When we tested it, the kids were like: 'Oh, Ron's stupid funny' and that became sort of a buzz phrase." Kim Possible was greeted with a level of enthusiasm that had not been experienced since the Disney Afternoon Lineup, becoming Disney Channel's most successful post-1990s show. Disney Channel Worldwide President Rich Ross extolled Kim Possible as a "stand-out" among both the network's live action and animated catalog. The series maintains "legions" of devoted fans. A poll conducted by Disney Channel revealed that Kim Possible viewers voted for Season 3's "Emotion Sickness" as their favorite episode of the series.

Entertainment Weekly ranked Kim Possible the fourth on greatest Disney Channel Original Series, calling it an "animated gem". Kim Possible was placed at number nine on TV Guide's ranking of "The Best Disney Channel Shows". MTV ranked Kim Possible 13th in its article "15 Disney Channel Series We Wish We Could Watch Again". According to a 2019 article by Screen Rant, Kim Possible is the sixth highest-ranked Disney Channel Original Series on IMDb, with a score of 7.2 at the time of publishing, praising its combination of "a strong female lead, a dude instead of a damsel in distress, and a slew of colorful villains to fight".

On June 7, 2022, Romano and Friedle appeared on Good Morning America to celebrate the 20th anniversary of Kim Possible and discuss its impact. On that same day, a special Kim Possible-themed episode of Romano and Friedle's podcast I Hear Voices was released. At the beginning, Romano and Friedle interview creators Mark McCorkle and Bob Schooley, as well as voice actors Nicole Sullivan (Shego) and John DiMaggio (Drakken). At the end, the four actors performed a brand new Kim Possible scene written by McCorkle and Schooley and directed by original Kim voice director Lisa Schaffer. The scene begins with Kim and Ron hanging at Bueno Nacho before entering Drakken's lair and tricked into being guests on Drakken and Shego's podcast. As usual, Kim and Ron escape but not before Kim gets into fisticuffs with Shego (with Drakken and Ron providing commentary on the fight).

== Related media ==
=== Films ===
The success of Kim Possible spawned two animated—as well as a live action—television films based on the series, becoming the first animated series to be adapted into a Disney Channel Original Movie. The first, Kim Possible: A Sitch in Time, is science fiction-themed. The second, Kim Possible Movie: So the Drama was originally going to be the series finale, but due to popular demand the series was renewed for the fourth season. On February 7, 2018, Disney announced that they were moving forward in making a live action Kim Possible film and the film itself premiered on February 15, 2019.

==== Kim Possible: A Sitch in Time ====
Kim Possible: A Sitch in Time is the first full-length animated TV movie based on the series. Dubbed an "extended episode," it premiered on Disney Channel on November 28, 2003. The film is science fiction-themed, with a plot centered around time travel, following Kim as she journeys both into the past and the future to save the world. It also explores the characters' origins, revealing how Kim and Ron first met and later became crime fighters, and features an all-star cast.

It originally aired between the 13th and 15th episodes of Season 2. In reruns, the film was typically split into three parts, serving as episodes 26, 27, and 28 of the second season. It was released on DVD in the U.S. (Region 1) on March 16, 2004, with two bonus features, and in the U.K. (Region 2) on March 14, 2005. An online episodic series consisting of three Flash-based video games based on the film was also released in 2003. On Disney+, the film is only available as three episodes.

==== Kim Possible Movie: So the Drama ====
Kim Possible Movie: So the Drama is the second TV movie based on the series, and it premiered on Disney Channel on April 8, 2005. It was originally intended to serve as the series finale, but due to popular demand the series was renewed for the fourth season. In its premiere night, the film received a 3.6 household rating - about 3.1 million viewers. It received generally positive reception. Emme Oliver of CBR described the movie as "awesome" and said that it "fits perfectly" into the series while "being outstanding on its own" and was so successfully that "Kim Possible was renewed for a fourth and final season." Oliver also asserted that the film pays "homage to traditional spy thrillers" and is action-packed. Oliver, a separate review, described the film as a "forgotten hidden gem" with "unparalleled magic" which is as "thrilling today as it was back then" when it originally released, enjoyable for fans and for anyone who likes "action flicks with a hint of coming-of-age" themes. Ben Protheroe of Screen Rant said the film gives fans "more of what they love" for the series, while making room "for plenty of exciting action scenes." He also argued that the film would evoke a "fond memory" and seeing Kim's battle suit "may bring about a wave of nostalgia." Tracey Petherick of Common Sense Media said that the film "combines teen angst with superhero antics" with a focus on family, friendship, and "what it means to be loyal and determined" with a coming-of-age storyline. She also said the film had "all the trademarks of the franchise" and combines clever storylines, fast-pacing, and "smart jokes," calling the film plot-filled and "family fun."

==== Live-action Kim Possible film ====
In between working on the first and second seasons of the series, series creators Bob Schooley and Mark McCorkle began writing a script for a live-action film adaptation. However, the project never materialized for unknown reasons. On February 7, 2018, Disney Channel announced that a live-action adaptation was in development. McCorkle and Schooley returned as executive producers, joined by Josh A. Cagan, Zanne Devine, Adam Stein, and Zach Lipovsky. The film, produced by Middleton Productions, was slated to begin filming in mid-2018 for a 2019 premiere.

Casting was revealed over several months: Sadie Stanley and Sean Giambrone were announced as the leads on April 25, 2018. followed by Alyson Hannigan, Connie Ray, Todd Stashwick, Taylor Ortega, Ciara Wilson, and Erika Tham on May 25. Issac Ryan Brown joined on June 22, with Christy Carlson Romano and Patton Oswalt announced on August 11, and Nancy Cartwright on January 14, 2019. Principal photography began on June 4, 2018 and wrapped on July 23, 2018, in Vancouver, British Columbia, including locations in Richmond at McMath Secondary School, and at the Cleveland Dam in North Vancouver.

The film premiered on Disney Channel and DisneyNOW on February 15, 2019. During its 8:00 p.m. debut, it drew 1.24 million viewers with a 0.22 rating among adults aged 18–49, making it the lowest-rated Disney Channel Original Movie premiere of the decade, until 2021's Under Wraps. Critical reception was mixed. Brian Lowry of CNN wrote: "It's all a good deal of fun, bringing the animated show to life while riffing on those conventions. That said, the tone can be a bit uneven, with Stanley nicely turning Kim into a flesh-and-blood girl, while Giambrone's Ron is played much closer to the cartoon version." Petrana Radulovic of Polygon said that the film "keeps the true spirit of the DCOMs many of us grew up with — Wendy Wu Homecoming Warrior, Halloweentown and Zenon: Girl of the 21st Century among them", and added: "Kim Possible is campy and hammers in its message with the subtlety of a sledgehammer, but that's not a critique. It just means that Kim Possible is, like most in the DCOM canon, a fun movie, and little else." Sabrina Pitre was nominated at the 2020 Canadian Cinema Editors Awards in the category Best Editing in Family - Series or MOW, Live Action for her work on this film.

=== Miniseries ===
The live action film was followed by a short-form miniseries, Kim Hushable, which aired from June 5 to 24, 2019 and was released on Disney Channel's YouTube account. The shorts take place after the movie and focus on Kim, Ron, and Athena as they help out in a library during spring break, all while dealing with various rogues and impressing Mr. Dewey. Warhok and Warmonga, who appeared in the original series, make an appearance in the shorts.

=== Video games and merchandise ===
The success of Kim Possible spawned its own video game series; a total of eight video games were released, supported by various gaming consoles and platforms:

- Disney's Kim Possible: Revenge of Monkey Fist (GBA) – released, November 13, 2002
- Disney's Kim Possible 2: Drakken's Demise (GBA) – released, September 15, 2004
- Disney's Kim Possible 3: Team Possible (GBA) – released, August 21, 2005
- Disney's Kim Possible: Kimmunicator (DS) – released, November 9, 2005
- Disney's Kim Possible: Legend of the Monkeys Eye (PC) – released, May 16, 2006
- Disney's Kim Possible: What's the Switch? (PS2) – released, October 19, 2006
- Disney's Kim Possible: Global Gemini (DS) – released, February 9, 2007
- Disney's Kim Possible (Java ME) – released in 2007

Additionally, Kim, Ron, Dr. Drakken, Shego, Monkey Fist, and Duff Killigan are all playable heroes in Disney Heroes: Battle Mode. Rufus also appears in Ron's blue skill.

In 2003, Disney began using the popularity of both Disney Channel's Kim Possible and Lizzie McGuire in an attempt to revive the company's struggling merchandising division, which had been suffering from a declining interest in movie and television tie-ins. In June 2004, McDonald's customers received Kim Possible memorabilia ranging from action figures to spy gear and accessories with their purchase of a Happy Meal. Customers were given a choice of eight different interactive toys to choose from, including a magnetic drawing tablet designed to resemble the Kimmunicator and action figures of Kim, Ron, Rufus, Shego, and Monkey Fist.

=== Epcot attraction ===
Based on the series, the Kim Possible World Showcase Adventure was an interactive attraction that took place in several of Epcot's World Showcase pavilions in Walt Disney World. The attraction is an electronic scavenger hunt that has guests using special "Kimmunicators" (in actuality, modified cell phones) to help Kim Possible and Ron Stoppable solve a "crime" or disrupt an evil-doer's "plans for global domination." The "Kimmunicator" is able to trigger specific events within the pavilion grounds that provide clues to completing the adventure. Launched in January 2009 and presented by Verizon Wireless, the Adventure is included in park admission.

The attraction was closed on May 18, 2012, to make way for a similar attraction themed around the character of "Agent P" from Disney Channel animated television show Phineas and Ferb. The new attraction, now called Disney's Phineas and Ferb's Agent P World Showcase Adventure, opened in June 2012.
