= Reflector (Pablo Cruise album) =

Studio album by Pablo Cruise
- Released: June 30, 1981
- Studios: Record Plant (Sausalito); Criteria (Miami)
- Genres: Pop rock; soft rock; yacht rock
- Length: 40:10
- Label: A&M
- Producer: Tom Dowd

Pablo Cruise chronology
Part of the Game (1979)	Reflector (1981)	Out of Our Hands (1983)

Professional ratings
Review scores
Source	Rating
AllMusic	3/5 stars

Reflector is the sixth studio album by the California soft rock group Pablo Cruise, released on June 30, 1981, by A&M Records. The album charted slightly higher than its immediate predecessor, reaching No. 34 in the US. Two singles were released from the album — "Cool Love" and "Slip Away", reaching No. 13 and No. 75, respectively, in the US. Produced by established and well-known R&B producer Tom Dowd, fans remarked that the album had a different feel to it.

Two changes in members were made before the album was released. After just two albums, bassist and vocalist Bruce Day was replaced by John Pierce while additional guitarist Angelo Rossi was added. Furthermore, keyboardist Cory Lerios sang lead vocals on "This Time" and "Inside/Outside", something he had not done on previous albums.

== Track listing ==
All tracks are written by David Jenkins and Cory Lerios, except where noted.

Side one
No.	Title	Writer(s)	Length
1.	"This Time"	Lerios	3:38
2.	"Cool Love"	Jenkins; Lerios; John Pierce	3:53
3.	"Don't Let the Magic Disappear"		5:15
4.	"One More Night"	Jenkins; Lerios; Pierce	3:58
5.	"Jenny"		3:48

Side two
No.	Title	Writer(s)	Length
6.	"Slip Away"	Jenkins; Pierce; Chuck Lutz	3:46
7.	"That's When"		3:53
8.	"Inside/Outside"	Lerios; Pierce	3:07
9.	"Paradise (Let Me Take You Into)"	Jenkins; Pierce	2:59
10.	"Drums in the Night"		5:53
Total length:			40:10

== Charts ==
Chart (1981)	Peak position
Australia (Kent Music Report)	83
US Billboard 200	34

== Personnel ==
=== Pablo Cruise ===
- David Jenkins – guitar, lead vocals (2–7, 9, 10), backing vocals
- Cory Lerios – keyboards, synthesizers, lead vocals (1, 8), backing vocals
- John Pierce – bass guitar, backing vocals
- Steve Price – drums, percussion, vibes
- Angelo Rossi – guitar, backing vocals

=== Technical ===
- Produced by Tom Dowd
- Engineered by Greg Price
- Assistant engineer – Rick Sanchez
- Mixed by Tom Dowd and Greg Price at Criteria Recording Studios (Miami, FL)
- Assistant mixing engineers – Chuck Kirkpatrick and Steve Klein
- Mastered by Bernie Grundman at A&M Recording Studios (Hollywood, CA)
- Art direction and album design – Chuck Beeson
- Illustration – Larry Vigon
- Photography – James Dean Robinson
- Album logo concept – Dennis Larkins
- Management – Bob Brown
