= Love Will Find a Way (Pablo Cruise song) =

Single by Pablo Cruise

from the album Worlds Away
- B-side: "Always Be Together"
- Released: May 1978
- Genre: Soft rock; yacht rock
- Length: 4:11 (album version); 3:40 (single version)
- Label: A&M
- Songwriters: David Jenkins, Cory Lerios
- Producer: Bill Schnee

Pablo Cruise singles chronology
"Never Had a Love" (1978)	"Love Will Find a Way" (1978)	"Don't Want to Live Without It" (1978)

"Love Will Find a Way" is a song released by American rock group Pablo Cruise from the album Worlds Away in May 1978. Released as a single, "Love Will Find a Way" peaked at number 6 on the Billboard Hot 100.

The song received a considerable amount of airplay during the summer of 1978, prompting critic Robert Christgau to say, "Hear David Jenkins sing 'once you get past the pain' fifty times in a day and the pain will be permanent", referring to the lyrics of the chorus.

== Chart performance ==
=== Weekly charts ===
Chart (1978)	Peak position
Australia (Kent Music Report)	8
Canada RPM Top Singles	5
Canada RPM Adult Contemporary	18
New Zealand (RIANZ)	20
U.S. Billboard Hot 100	6
U.S. Billboard Easy Listening	28
U.S. Cash Box Top 100	5

=== Year-end charts ===
Chart (1978)	Rank
Australia (Kent Music Report)	64
Canada	48
U.S. Billboard Hot 100	44
U.S. Cash Box	36
