= Steve Price (musician) =

American musician

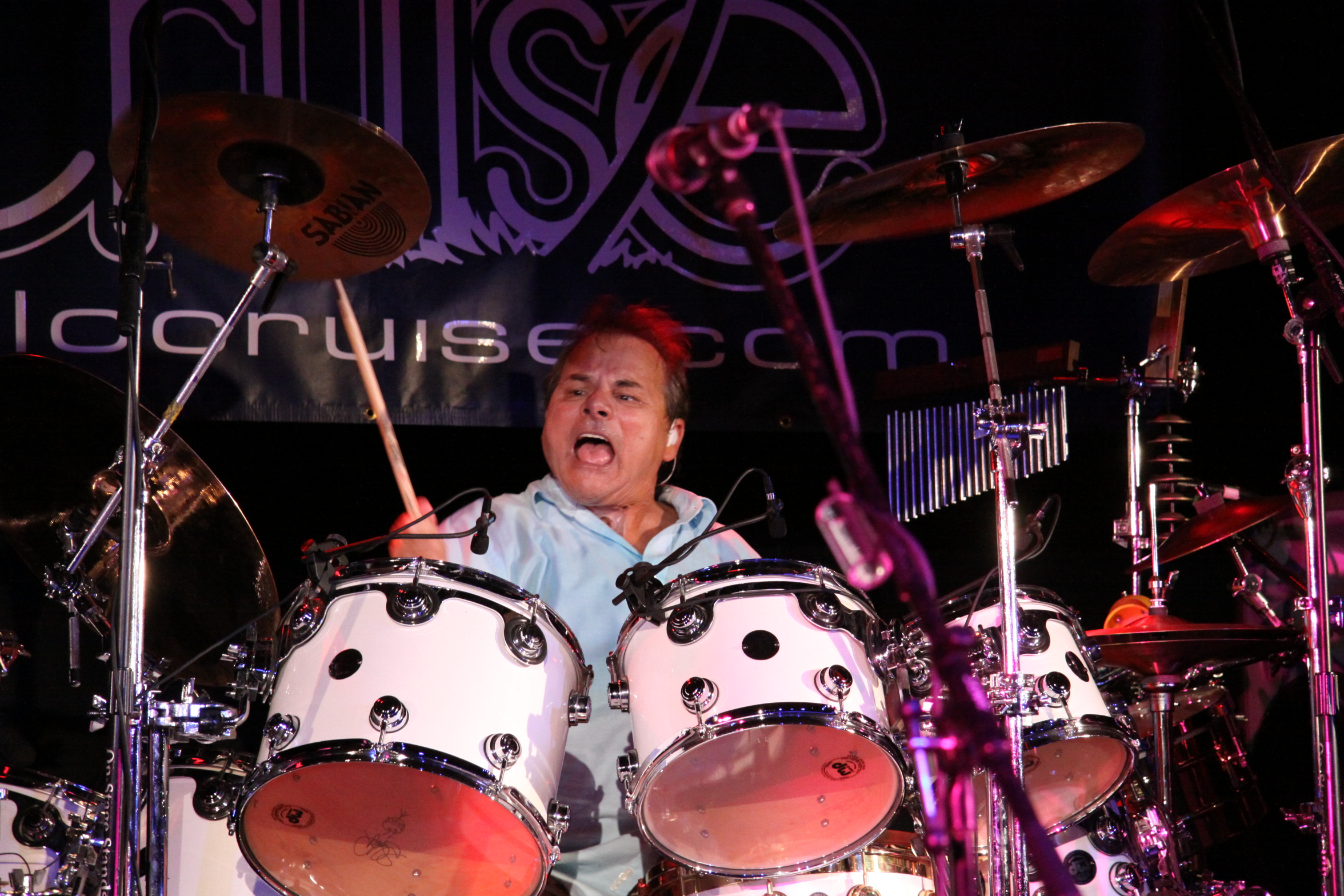

Background information
- Genres: Rock; pop rock
- Instruments: Drums; percussion
- Years active: 1969–1981; 2004–present
- Labels: A&M; Warner Bros.
- Website: pablocruiseband.com

Stephen Martin "Steve" Price is an American drummer and percussionist, best known as a founding and current member of the California smooth rock band Pablo Cruise.

In his first year of high school, Price ventured into the band room after having no interest in woodwork or metal work. The teacher instructed him to sit behind a snare drum, due to requiring a drummer and this would change his life forever. Following a brief stint in his high school marching band, he was recruited to play drums for the school's band. He then worked as a roadie for the band of his high school friend, keyboardist Cory Lerios, but when the drummer quit, Price became the new drummer. The pair then played in a band called Together and were recruited to play in San Francisco band Stoneground, which turned out to be a big break. Stoneground also performed in the 1972 horror film Dracula A.D. 1972 (starring Christopher Lee).

Alongside guitarist Dave Jenkins, Lerios and bassist Bud Cockrell, Price was a member of Pablo Cruise at its conception in 1973 and stayed until early 1981. In 2004, Price and Lerios rejoined Pablo Cruise and Cockrell left the group. Price joined a Sacramento side project, Mr. December, in 2008. During his time away from Pablo Cruise, Price went on to become a leading figure in providing E-learning and also formed his own aerial photography company.

At one stage, Price was virtually the in-house drummer and percussionist at The Record Plant in Sausalito. He now lives in Rio Vista, California.

In a 1981 live performance with Pablo Cruise, Price augmented his drum kit with temple blocks, cowbells, agogo bells, timbales, crotales, bells, triangles, mark tree and Syndrums.

== Discography ==
- Pablo Cruise – Pablo Cruise
- Pablo Cruise – Lifeline
- Pablo Cruise – A Place in the Sun
- Pablo Cruise – Worlds Away
- Pablo Cruise – Part of the Game
- Pablo Cruise – Reflector
- Rick James – Street Songs
- Grace Slick – Garden of Man
