= Lifeline (Pablo Cruise album) =

Studio album by Pablo Cruise
- Released: March 1976
- Studio: Sound Factory (Hollywood)
- Genre: Soft rock, yacht rock
- Length: 36:15
- Label: A&M
- Producer: Val Garay

Pablo Cruise chronology
Pablo Cruise (1975)	Lifeline (1976)	A Place in the Sun (1977)

Professional ratings
Review scores
Source	Rating
Christgau's Record Guide	C−

Lifeline is the second album by the California soft rock group Pablo Cruise. Released in 1976, the album reached No. 139 on the Billboard Top LPs chart in the United States. In 1977, Barbra Streisand recorded "Don't Believe It" with mostly different lyrics for her album Superman.

== Track listing ==
Side One

1. "Crystal" (Jenkins, Lerios) - 3:42 (lead singer: Bud Cockrell)
2. "Don't Believe It" (Ron Nagle) - 3:15 (lead singer: David Jenkins)
3. "Tearin' Down My Mind" (Eugene Autry) - 3:58 (lead singer: Bud Cockrell)
4. "(I Think) It's Finally Over" (Jenkins, Lerios) - 3:13 (lead singers: David Jenkins, Bud Cockrell)
5. "Lifeline" (Ron Nagle) - 3:36 (lead singers: David Jenkins, Bud Cockrell)

Side Two

1. "Zero to Sixty in Five" (Jenkins, Lerios) - 5:01 (instrumental)
2. "Look to the Sky" (Cockrell) - 3:03 (lead singer: Bud Cockrell)
3. "Never See That Girl Enough" (Jenkins) - 3:28 (lead singer: David Jenkins)
4. "Who Knows" (Cockrell) - 3:38 (lead singer: Bud Cockrell)
5. "Good Ship Pablo Cruise" (Jenkins, Lerios, Price) - 3:28 (lead singer: David Jenkins)

== Personnel ==
Pablo Cruise

- David Jenkins - guitars, harmonica, lead and backing vocals; bass on "Who Knows"
- Steve Price - drums, percussion
- Bud Cockrell - bass, lead and backing vocals
- Cory Lerios - keyboards, backing vocals, synthesizer

Additional personnel

- Geoffrey Palmer, Steve Frediani - saxophone
- Andrew Gold - electric guitar, backing vocals, tambourine on "Lifeline"
- Don Francisco, Venetta Fields - backing vocals
- Dan Levitt - guitar harmonies on "Zero to Sixty in Five"
- Dan Dugmore - pedal steel guitar on "Look to the Sky"
- David Campbell - strings and horn arrangements on "Zero to Sixty in Five"

== Production ==
- Val Garay - producer, engineer
- Greg Ladanyi, Steve Maslow - assistant engineers
- Doug Sax - mastering
- Norman Seeff - photography
- Roland Young - art direction
- Junie Osaki - design
