= Always Be Together =

Always Be Together may refer to:

- "Always Be Together", a song by Pablo Cruise from Worlds Away, 1978
- "Always Be Together", song by Little Mix from DNA, 2012
