= Cool Love =

Single by Pablo Cruise

from the album Reflector
- B-side: "Jenny"
- Released: 1981
- Genre: Soft rock
- Length: 3:52
- Label: A&M
- Songwriters: David Jenkins; Cory Lerios; John Pierce
- Producer: Tom Dowd

Pablo Cruise singles chronology
"I Want You Tonight" (1979)	"Cool Love" (1981)	"Slip Away" (1981)

"Cool Love" is a song by American rock group Pablo Cruise, released in 1981 as the first single from their album Reflector.

== Background ==
David Jenkins sings the lead vocal on this ballad, telling his lover some of the ways their love is "cool" and summing it up that "cool love baby, that's what it's all about."

== Charts ==
The song was the fifth and final top 40 hit for the band, reaching No. 13 on the Billboard Hot 100.

=== Weekly charts ===
Chart (1981)	Peak position
Australia (Kent Music Report)	91
U.S. Billboard Hot 100	13
U.S. Billboard Hot Soul Singles	78

=== Year-end charts ===
Year-end chart (1981)	Rank
US Top Pop Singles (Billboard)	80
