= Pablo Cruise (album) =

Studio album by Pablo Cruise
- Released: May 1975
- Studio: A&M, Hollywood; Sunset Sound, Los Angeles; Record Plant, Sausalito
- Genre: Soft rock, yacht rock
- Length: 43:26
- Label: A&M
- Producer: Michael James Jackson

Pablo Cruise chronology
Pablo Cruise (1975)	Lifeline (1976)

Pablo Cruise is the debut album by the California soft rock group Pablo Cruise, released in 1975.

== Track listing ==
Side One

1. "Island Woman" (David Batteau, David Jenkins, Cory Lerios) - 5:02
2. "Denny" (David Jenkins, Cory Lerios) - 3:01
3. "Sleeping Dogs" (Bud Cockrell) - 3:52
4. "What Does it Take" (David Jenkins, Cory Lerios) - 4:51
5. "Rock 'N' Roller" (Bud Cockrell) - 5:21

Side Two

1. "Not Tonight" (Ron Nagle) - 3:01
2. "In My Own Quiet Way" (Bradford Craig, David Jenkins, Cory Lerios) - 4:15
3. "Ocean Breeze" (David Jenkins, Cory Lerios) - 12:24

== Personnel ==
Pablo Cruise

- David Jenkins – electric and acoustic guitars, lead and backing vocals
- Cory Lerios – piano, backing vocals
- Bud Cockrell – bass, lead and backing vocals
- Steve Price – drums, percussion

Additional musicians

- Michael Utley – organ on "Sleeping Dogs", "Rock N' Roller" and "Not Tonight"
- Bobbye Hall Porter – additional percussion on "Island Woman" and "Denny"
- Carolyn Brand – additional backing vocals on "Not Tonight"

=== Production ===
- Michael James Jackson - producer
- Larry Forkner - engineer
- Norm Kinney - engineer, remixing
- Russ Landau - project coordinator
- David Paich - arranger, conductor, keyboards, string arrangements
