= A Place in the Sun (Pablo Cruise album) =

Studio album by Pablo Cruise
- Released: February 1977
- Recorded: 1976
- Studio: The Record Plant (Sausalito)
- Genres: Pop rock, soft rock, yacht rock
- Length: 40:02
- Label: A&M
- Producer: Bill Schnee

Pablo Cruise chronology
Lifeline (1976)	A Place in the Sun (1977)	Worlds Away (1978)

Professional ratings
Review scores
Source	Rating
AllMusic	1.5/5 stars
Christgau's Record Guide	C

A Place in the Sun is the third album by the California soft rock group Pablo Cruise. The album marked an entrance into the mainstream for the band, and the first single from the album, "Whatcha Gonna Do?" reached number 6 on the Pop Singles charts. The title track, "A Place in the Sun" was the second and less successful single on the album, reaching number 42, but remains the favorite among many fans of the band today. The track "Raging Fire" was released as the B-side of "I Go to Rio" in 1978. This was the group's last album with original bassist Bud Cockrell, who left the band after its release.

== Track listing ==
Side one
No.	Title	Writer(s)	Length
1.	"A Place in the Sun"	Cory Lerios; Bud Cockrell	4:44
2.	"Whatcha Gonna Do?"	Lerios; David Jenkins	4:17
3.	"Raging Fire"	Lerios; Jenkins	4:41
4.	"I Just Wanna Believe"	Lerios	4:15
5.	"Tonight My Love"	Lerios	3:53

Side two
No.	Title	Writer(s)	Length
6.	"Can't You Hear the Music?"	Lerios; Steve Price	4:07
7.	"Never Had a Love"	Lerios; Jenkins	5:08
8.	"Atlanta June"	Jenkins; Price	4:08
9.	"El Verano"	Lerios; Jenkins; Cockrell; Price	4:40
Total length:			40:02

== Charts ==
Chart (1977)	Peak position
Australia (Kent Music Report)	92
United States (Billboard 200)	19

== Personnel ==
=== Pablo Cruise ===
- David Jenkins – guitars, lead vocals
- Cory Lerios – piano, keyboards, synthesizers, backing vocals
- Bud Cockrell – bass, lead vocals
- Steve Price – drums, percussion

=== Technical ===
- Produced and engineered by Bill Schnee
- Assistant engineer – Eric Schilling
- Mixed by Bill Schnee at Cherokee Studios (Hollywood, CA)
- Assistant mixing engineer – George Tutko
- Synthesizer programming – Pat Gleeson
- Photography – John Morris
- Album design – Chris Frayne
- Mastered by Mike Reese at The Mastering Lab (Los Angeles, CA)
- Management – Bob Brown
