= Pablo Cruise =

American pop/rock music band

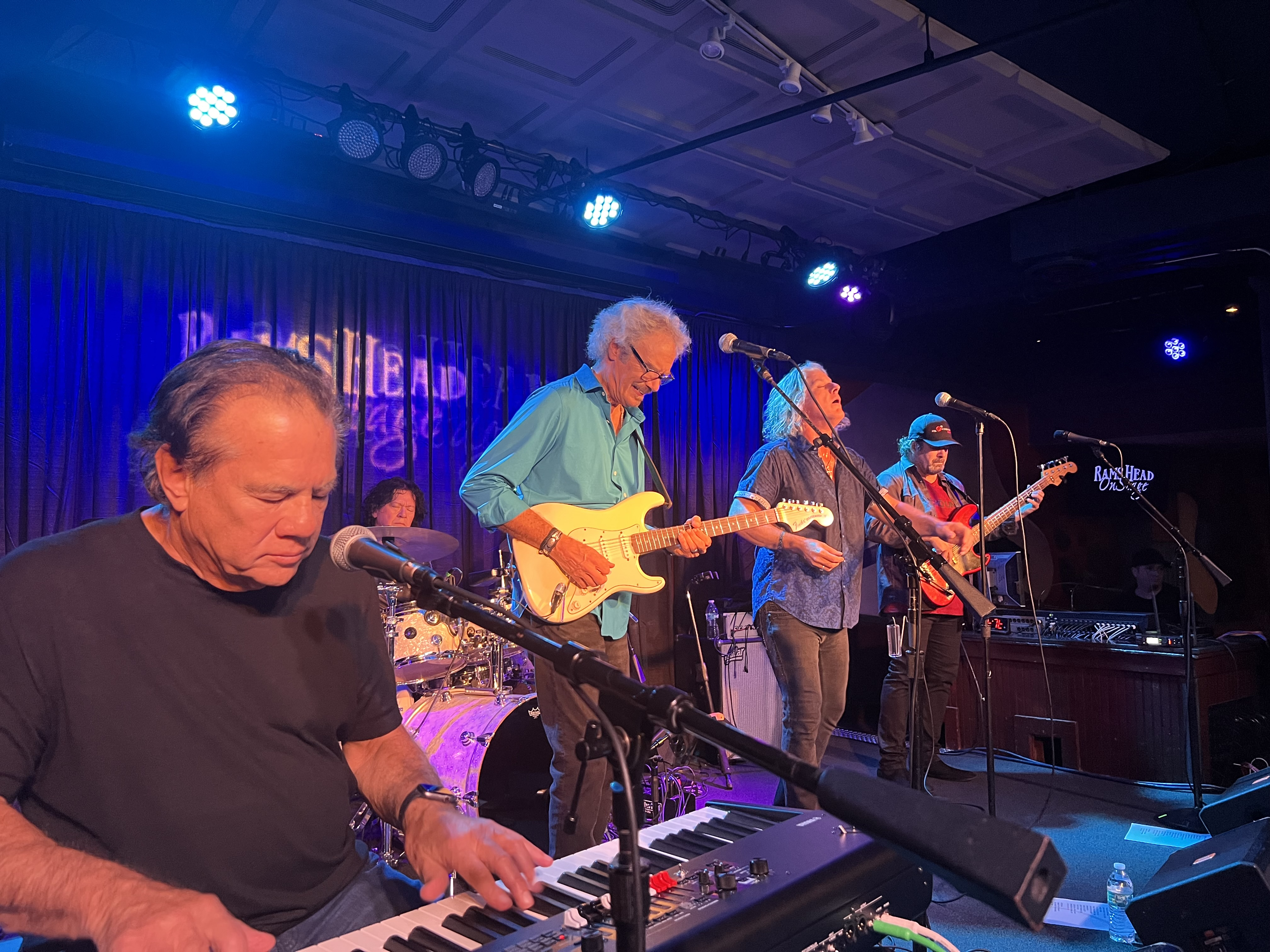
- Pablo Cruise live in Annapolis, MD 2023

Background information
- Origin: San Francisco, California, U.S.
- Genres: Soft rock, pop rock, jazz rock
- Years active: 1973–1986, 1996–present
- Label: A&M
- Members: David Jenkins; Cory Lerios; Steve Price; Larry Antonino; Robbie Wyckoff
- Past members: Bud Cockrell; Bruce Day; John Pierce; Angelo Rossi; David Perper; Stef Birnbaum; Ken Emerson; George Gabriel; Sergio Gonzalez
- Website: www.pablocruise.com

Pablo Cruise is an American pop/rock band from San Francisco currently composed of David Jenkins (guitar and vocals), Cory Lerios (keyboards and vocals), Steve Price (drums), Larry Antonino (bass and vocals), and Robbie Wyckoff (vocals and percussion). Formed in 1973, the band released seven studio albums over the next decade, during which time five singles reached the top 25 of the Billboard Hot 100. The group underwent several personnel changes and split up in 1986. The original lineup—Jenkins, Lerios, Price and Bud Cockrell—reunited briefly in 2004, and the group continues to tour today with three out of the original four members present.

== History ==
Pablo Cruise began in San Francisco in 1973 with former members of Stoneground (Cory Lerios on keyboards and vocals, David Jenkins as vocalist and on guitar and Steve Price on drums) and It's a Beautiful Day (Bud Cockrell on bass and vocals). Lerios had formed a band, Together, while at Palo Alto High School. His classmate Steve Price signed on as a roadie (because he owned a van), then joined the group on drums when their drummer left. They were eventually to find their way into Stoneground, where they were joined by Jenkins (originally from Ypsilanti, Michigan).

Initially, many fans assumed that Pablo Cruise was the name of one of the members of the band. When asked the question, the band, which is a quartet, would answer, "He's the guy in the middle." When asked what Pablo Cruise meant, the band would say that "Pablo represents an honest, real, down-to-earth individual and Cruise depicts his fun-loving and easygoing attitude towards life." Casey Kasem claimed that the band's name originated with a drifter.

With the help of their new manager, Bob Brown (who would later steer Huey Lewis and the News to stardom), the band signed to A&M Records and released its first album in May 1975, a minor success self-titled Pablo Cruise, and their second album in March 1976, titled Lifeline. Their second album achieved slightly greater success than their first but still only managed to chart at No. 139 in the United States. The instrumental "Zero to Sixty in Five" from Lifeline was used as theme music for various sports television shows. That success encouraged the band to try their hand at more film and TV scoring.

1977's A Place in the Sun was the turning point in the band's career as they finally entered the mainstream music scene with hit singles "Whatcha Gonna Do?" (No. 6) and the title track "A Place in the Sun" (No. 42), the album peaked at No. 19 on the Billboard 200.

== Further success and lineup changes ==
In the middle of 1977, Bud Cockrell left to form a duo with his wife and former It's a Beautiful Day bandmate Pattie Santos and was replaced by Bruce Day (who had played in a band with Carlos Santana before his Santana days).

Day's first album with the band was the RIAA platinum-selling 1978 album Worlds Away, which spawned the hits "Love Will Find a Way" and "Don't Want to Live Without It". It also featured a cover of Australian singer-songwriter Peter Allen's hit single "I Go to Rio" and the follow-up album was 1979's Part of the Game that spawned the hit "I Want You Tonight". Also that year, Pablo Cruise contributed the song "Reach For The Top" to the movie Dreamer and the following year, they placed "What've You Got To Lose" with the film Inside Moves.

Day's tenure was short-lived and after he left the band in 1980, he was replaced by the session bassist John Pierce who, alongside newly added second guitarist Angelo Rossi (from the Cockrell & Santos band), debuted on the 1981 album Reflector, and it spawned the band's last Top 40 hit "Cool Love".

In mid-1981, Price left suddenly and was initially succeeded by Donny Baldwin, who had played with Elvin Bishop and would move on to Jefferson Starship by the summer of 1982. David Perper was next to take over the drum throne and Angelo Rossi was replaced by Stef Birnbaum (aka Stef Burns) after just one album.

In 1983 the group released Out of Our Hands, which featured a change of sound to a more "'80s pop keyboard direction" with Lerios bringing in more synthesizers and downplaying the piano, which had until then been a characteristic of the group's sound and Price played drums on two songs. The band then toured again that year with another new member, Jorge Bermudez, on vocals and percussion. Mostly due to the rising popularity of new wave, the album struggled with sales. But by the end of 1984, Pierce, Birnbaum, Perper and Bermudez had left and the group's contract with A&M had come to an end.

== 1985 attempted reunion and hiatus ==
In 1985 the four original members, Jenkins, Lerios, Price and Cockrell, reunited hoping to score a new record deal. It was not to be, however, and the group called it quits in 1986.

Jenkins moved on to join country rockers Southern Pacific in 1987, alongside former Doobie Brothers members Keith Knudsen and John McFee and Creedence Clearwater Revival bass player Stu Cook. After leaving Southern Pacific in 1989, Jenkins relocated to Hawaii where he was introduced to Hawaiian artist Kapono Beamer and began writing music with him. This eventually led to their album Cruisin' On Hawaiian Time (2006), a collection of songs dedicated to the Hawaiian Islands.

In the meantime, Cory Lerios worked on movie and television scores, providing the music for the popular 1990s series Baywatch, among many others.

== 1996 partial reunion ==
Around 1996, Jenkins and Cockrell reunited once again as Pablo Cruise, but Lerios and Price were unable to rejoin at the time. Keyboardist Kincaid Miller and drummer Kevin Wells (ex-Clover) were brought in to replace them, and percussionist James Henry also appeared with the band as an occasional special guest from 1999 to 2008. Additionally, second guitarist Kenny Emerson (replacing Stef Burns, who had briefly returned to the band in 1998) and two additional backup singers, Regina Espinoza and Carolyn, were also recruited (from 1999 to 2002) for added stage attraction. Drummer Billy Johnson (ex-Santana) frequently sat in for Wells during this same time.

Former bassist Bruce Day died on June 30, 1999, in Windsor, California, from unknown causes at the age of 48.

== 2004 to present ==
In June 2004 all four original Pablo members were back together playing again at Steve Price's wedding. This led to three of the four—Jenkins, Lerios and Price—deciding to reconvene permanently. Cockrell was not involved this time and George Gabriel joined on bass and vocals. During his time away from Pablo Cruise, Price went on to become a leading figure in providing E-learning and also formed his own aerial photography company. Gabriel left Pablo Cruise in November 2009 and was replaced by veteran bassist Larry Antonino (who has worked with Air Supply, Jeff Beck, Ronnie Laws and many others) in 2010.

Bud Cockrell died on March 6, 2010, after complications from diabetes. He was 59.

On November 8, 2011 Pablo Cruise released their first live album, It's Good to Be Live, on the Red Recording label. The package included both a live CD and DVD. The live performances were taken from concerts performed at the Blue Goose in Loomis, CA on July 9 and 10, 2010. The CD also featured new versions of their songs "A Place in the Sun" (featuring fellow Red Recording artist Katrina) and "Love Will Find a Way" (with Ty Taylor of Vintage Trouble).

In 2015 Cory Lerios released an EP, If I Could Change Anything It Would Be You!, under the name Cory Charles.

In 2017 the band was joined by singer/percussionist Robbie Wyckoff who had appeared with Pink Floyd's Roger Waters on his The Wall Live tour. Lerios and Jenkins subsequently began performing fewer lead vocals.

In February 2020 the band finished the Rock and Romance Cruise, which turned out to be their final shows for 2020. During the COVID-19 lockdown, the band worked on a new single, "Breathe", via Skype, with new drummer Sergio Gonzalez in place of Steve Price, who had retired from the group due to health issues.

The band resumed playing shows in the summer of 2021 and continues to tour, mainly in and around California.

In November 2025 it was announced that drummer and founding member Steve Price had rejoined Pablo Cruise.

== Band members ==
=== Current members ===
- David Jenkins – guitar, vocals (1973–1986, 1996–present)
- Cory Lerios – keyboards, synthesizers, vocals (1973–1986, 2004–present)
- Steve Price – drums, percussion (1973–1981, 2004–2020, 2025–present)
- Larry Antonino – bass, vocals (2010–present)
- Robbie Wyckoff – lead vocals, percussion (2017–present)

=== Past members ===
- Bud Cockrell – bass, vocals (1973–1977, 1985–1986, 1996–2004; died 2010)
- Bruce Day – bass, vocals (1977–1980; died 1999)
- John Pierce – bass, vocals (1980–1984)
- Angelo Rossi – guitar, vocals (1980–1983)
- Donny Baldwin – drums, percussion (1981–1982)
- David Perper – drums, percussion (1982–1984)
- Stef Birnbaum – guitar, vocals (1983–1984, 1998) (aka Stef Burns)
- Jorge Bermudez - vocals, percussion (1983–1984)
- Kincaid Miller - keyboards (1996–2004)
- Kevin Wells - drums, percussion, backing vocals (1996–2004)
- James Henry - percussion (touring substitute 1999–2008)
- Billy Johnson - drums, percussion (touring substitute 1999-2002)
- Kenny Emerson - guitar, vocals (1999-2002)
- Regina Espinoza - backup vocals (1999-2002)
- Carolyn - backup vocals (1999-2002)
- George Gabriel – bass, vocals (2004–2009)
- Sergio Gonzalez – drums, percussion (2020–2025)

== Discography ==
=== Studio albums ===
List of studio albums, with selected chart positions
Title	Album details	Peak chart positions		Certifications
Title	Album details	US	AUS	Certifications
Pablo Cruise	Release date: May 1975; Label: A&M Records	174	—	
Lifeline	Release date: March 1976; Label: A&M Records	139	—	
A Place in the Sun	Release date: February 1977; Label: A&M Records	19	92	RIAA: Platinum
Worlds Away	Release date: May 1978; Label: A&M Records	6	7	RIAA: Platinum
Part of the Game	Release date: October 1979; Label: A&M Records	39	53	
Reflector	Release date: July 1981; Label: A&M Records	34	83	
Out of Our Hands	Release date: February 15th, 1983; Label: A&M Records	—	—	
"—" denotes a recording that did not chart or was not released in that territory.

=== Compilation albums ===
List of compilation albums, with selected chart positions
Title	Album details
Classics Volume 26	Release date: October 11, 1988; Label: A&M Records
The Best of Pablo Cruise	Release date: May 8, 2001; Label: A&M Records

=== Live albums ===
List of live albums, with selected chart positions
Title	Album details
It's Good to Be Live	Release date: November 8, 2011; Label: Red General Catalog

=== Singles ===
List of singles, with selected chart positions
Year	Single	Peak positions				Album
Year	Single	US BB	US CB	CAN	AUS	Album
"Island Woman"	1975	104	115	—	—	Pablo Cruise
"What Does It Take"	1975	—	—	—	—	Pablo Cruise
"I Think It's Finally Over"	1976	—	—	—	—	Lifeline
"Don't Believe It"	1976	—	—	—	—	Lifeline
"Crystal"	1976	—	—	—	—	Lifeline
"Whatcha Gonna Do?"	1977	6	3	1	—	A Place in the Sun
"A Place in the Sun"	1977	42	42	36	—	A Place in the Sun
"Never Had a Love"	1978	87	89	87	—	A Place in the Sun
"Love Will Find a Way"	1978	6	5	5	8	Worlds Away
"Don't Want to Live Without It"	1978	21	18	10	76	Worlds Away
"I Go to Rio"	1979	46	56	39	—	Worlds Away
"I Want You Tonight"	1979	19	21	18	43	Part of the Game
"Cool Love"	1981	13	17	—	91	Reflector
"Slip Away"	1981	75	86	—	—	Reflector
"Will You, Won't You"	1983	107	—	—	—	Out of Our Hands
"Breathe"	2020	—	—	—	—	Non-album single
"—" denotes a recording that did not chart or was not released in that territory.

== See also ==
- List of best-selling music artists
