= The Mummy (TV series) =

American animated series

- Title card
- Also known as: The Mummy: The Animated Series; The Mummy: Secrets of the Medjai (season 2)
- Genre: Action; Adventure; High fantasy Supernatural fiction
- Created by: Stephen Sommers
- Based on: Characters by: Stephen Sommers; Lloyd Fonvielle; Kevin Jarre
- Developed by: Thomas Pugsley; Greg Klein
- Directed by: Eddy Houchins; Dick Sebast
- Voices of: Chris Marquette; Grey DeLisle; Tom Kenny; John Schneider; Jim Cummings; Michael Reisz; Nicholas Guest
- Narrated by: Jim Cummings
- Composers: George Gabriel; Cory Lerios; John D'Andrea
- Country of origin: United States
- Original language: English
- No. of seasons: 2
- No. of episodes: 26

Production
- Executive producer: Stephen Sommers
- Producers: Diane A. Crea; Joe Barruso; Greg Klein; Thomas Pugsley
- Editor: Ken Solomon
- Running time: 20 minutes (approx.)
- Production companies: Universal Cartoon Studios; The Sommers Company; Studios USA Television

Original release
- Network: The WB (Kids' WB)
- Release: September 29, 2001 – June 7, 2003

The Mummy (also known as The Mummy: The Animated Series) is an American animated series produced by Universal Cartoon Studios based on the 1999 film of the same name. It premiered on Kids' WB on The WB network on September 29, 2001. It is set in 1938. It was retooled and renamed The Mummy: Secrets of the Medjai for its second and final season, which began on February 8, 2003. The show was cancelled on June 7 of the same year. Reruns of the show aired on Kids' WB until it was removed from its Saturday morning lineup around July 2003.

== Plot ==
Based loosely on the films The Mummy and The Mummy Returns, the series' plot follows the O'Connells who are pursued on their journey around the world by the undead corrupt High Priest, Imhotep, and his lackey, Colin Weasler, while trying to get the Manacle of Osiris off Alex's wrist. This leads them to seek the lost scrolls of Thebes, the only things that can remove the manacle and which must be destroyed to prevent Imhotep from possessing the manacle. In the series' second season, Alex is trained as a Medjai to combat the mummy, facing new threats along the way.

== Characters ==
=== Main characters ===
- Alex O'Connell (voiced by Chris Marquette) is a 12-year-old, later 14-year-old, boy with a fantastic imagination and boundless curiosity. Alex possesses the best, and sometimes the worst, traits of both parents. Homeschooled by Evelyn, he knows ancient histories and languages well for his age. Alex inherited his father's brashness, sense of humor, and adventurous spirit, traits which frequently get him in trouble. As the series progresses, Alex learns to control the Manacle's powers; however, with these powers comes a great responsibility, one that Alex does not take lightly despite his young age.
- Rick O'Connell (voiced by John Schneider) is Alex's tough father, Evelyn's husband and Jonathan's brother-in-law.
- Evelyn 'Evie' Carnahan O'Connell (voiced by Grey DeLisle) is Alex's mother, Rick's wife, and Jonathan's younger sister. Like in the films, she is the reincarnation of the Egyptian princess Nefertiri.
- Jonathan Carnahan (voiced by Tom Kenny) is Alex's maternal uncle, Evelyn's bumbling but good natured elder brother, and Rick's brother-in-law.

=== Allies ===
- Ardeth Bay (voiced by Nicholas Guest) is the leader of the Medjai. In the second season, he and the other Medjai train Alex, Fadil, Yanit, and other students to be the next generation of Medjai.
- Fadil (voiced by Jeff Bennett) is a boy who is a student at becoming a Medjai.
- Tut is a mongoose from India and Alex's pet, who Rick allows Alex to keep despite being allergic to him.
- Yanit (voiced by Jeannie Elias) is a girl who is a student at becoming a Medjai.
- The Minotaur (voiced by Kevin Michael Richardson) is a Medjai who chose to become a minotaur to protect the Scrolls of Thebes from the First French Empire under Napoleon Bonaparte. He dwelled beneath Paris' catacombs until he encounters the O'Connells and is thought to be buried under rubble. However, he returns in the series finale to help the O'Connells stop Imhotep from raising the Army of Anubis.
- Jack O'Connell (voiced by Charles Napier) is Rick's father, whom he is estranged from until "Like Father, Like Son". He is revealed to be a Medjai, meaning that both Rick and Alex are of Medjai descent.
- Jin-Wu (voiced by Mona Marshall) is a young boy and the Emperor of China. He steals an ancient shrine and imprisons the O'Connells when they threaten to reveal this. When the theft incites an ancient Chinese dragon to attack Jin-Wu's city, he admits his wrongdoing and helps Alex undo the curse.

=== Villains ===
- Imhotep (voiced by Jim Cummings) is the titular antagonist of the series. Many years ago, Imhotep was the keeper of the Scrolls of Thebes and a priest who sought to rule the world. He attempted to steal the Manacle of Osiris, but the Pharaoh sent his royal guards to capture him and sentence him to be mummified alive. Years later, Imhotep was resurrected by Colin Weasler despite Evy's attempt to destroy him, plotting to seek the Scroll of Thebes to remove the Manacle of Osiris from Alex. During the fight in the Paris Catacombs where the Scrolls of Thebes are, he regains the Scrolls, but Alex destroys them using the Manacle's power. Though he was thought dead when fighting the Minotaur within the flooding catacombs, Imhotep managed to survive and strove to find other ways to conquer the world. Unlike the films, in the series he is able to speak contemporary English.
- Anck-Su-Namun (voiced by Lenore Zann) is the former lover of Imhotep, who was mummified for betraying the Pharaoh and murdering Princess Nefertiri. She was revived by Imhotep by throwing her body into the Lake of Eternity, as he needed her to locate the Scythe of Anubis, which she and Nefertiri hid away long ago. However, when they acquired the scythe, Anck-Su-Namun betrayed Imhotep, refusing to be his subordinate. Nefertiri, resurfacing in Evy's body, called on Anubis to reclaim what was his. Anck-Su-Namun, refusing to let go of her prize, went down into the Underworld with Anubis, but Ardeth believed that they had not seen the last of her. Anck-Su-Namun resurfaced in "Old Friends" and took a magic ring, enabling her to steal the youth from others to regenerate herself before going after the Manacle. However, the O'Connells stop her and send her back to the Underworld.
- Colin Weasler (voiced by Michael Reisz) is Imhotep's servant and Evy's co-worker/rival from the museum. Younger than Evy and driven by blind ambition, he is a liar and backstabber, and jealous of Evy's archaeological fame. Craving power and respect, as well as fame over fortune, Weasler summons Imhotep to get revenge on Evy. However, he soon realizes that he got more than he bargained for and chooses to serve Imhotep rather than be his first victim. Throughout the series, Weasler talks tough while serving as Imhotep's subordinate. However, over time he becomes more greedy, believing that if he devotes himself to Imhotep, he will reward him once he takes over the world. Following Imhotep's apparent death in his fight with the Minotaur in the Catacombs of Paris, Weasler was shown writing comics and claiming to be Imhotep's master when Imhotep returns. Despite his personality, Weasler is occasionally a physical threat to the O'Connells. Weasler is analogous to the character Beni Gabor from The Mummy.
- Ninzam Toth (voiced by Michael T. Weiss) is a Dark Medjai who betrayed the other Medjai and was imprisoned for his actions after he fought Ardeth Bay and lost. After escaping, he plots revenge on the Medjai before being defeated by Alex, Yanit, and Fadil, but returns to continue his vengeance on the Medjai.
- Scarab (voiced by René Auberjonois) is a monstrous scarab-like creature that was sealed away in the Scarab Amulet by the powers of the Manacle of Osiris. Alex and Jack accidentally free the Scarab while trying to obtain the Amulet.
- The Rakshasa/Tiger-Man (voiced by John DiMaggio) is a humanoid tiger beast from the Temple of Shiva in Sri Lanka who possesses shapeshifting abilities. The beast was captured by Jonathan's old friend Charlie Royce as an attraction at an amusement park in Chicago. Later, he shapeshifts into the form of Royce to deceive Jonathan into believing that the beast had escaped and locked Royce in the cage to get free. He then attempts to get the Eye of Shiva, but gets into a fight with Imhotep, who also wants the Eye.
- The Aglaophones (voiced by April Winchell and Kathy Najimy) are female bird-like creatures whose songs can enslave any man to do their bidding. They tried to steal the Cloak of Isis, which increases the wearer's power tenfold, but were imprisoned in a wall carving by the gods with the Flute of Nephthys. Colin Weasler used the Flute to free them, wrongly believing they would serve him. They have aspects of both the Sirens and Harpies of Greek mythology.

== Episodes ==
=== Series overview ===
Season	Episodes	Originally released	
Season	Episodes	First released	Last released
1	13	September 29, 2001	February 16, 2002
2	13	February 15, 2003	June 7, 2003

=== Season 1 (2001–02) ===
No. overall	No. in season	Title	Written by	Original release date
1	1	"The Summoning"	Thomas Pugsley; Greg Klein	September 29, 2001
After being promoted to Chief Archeologist, Evy and her family head to Egypt for an archeological dig. While they are there, the Manacle of Osiris attaches itself to her son, Alex, while an Egyptian mummy named Imhotep is unleashed and is after Alex and the gang.
2	2	"A Candle in the Darkness"	Steven Melching	October 6, 2001
While Alex is struggling with his school lessons, the gang heads out searching for the lost library at Alexandria. Once there, they encounter an angry Imhotep who wants nothing more than to see Alex's destruction.
3	3	"Against the Elements"	Thomas Pugsley; Greg Klein	October 13, 2001
While in India, the gang finds a mysterious book. Later, a stroll through a local town leads them to a new ally named Tut.
4	4	"The Deep Blue Sea"	Tony Schillaci	October 20, 2001
When powers from the Manacle of Osiris start to manifest, Alex worries if he'll be able to handle them. Meanwhile, the gang searches for treasure in an ancient underwater city.
5	5	"Eruption"	Thomas Pugsley; Greg Klein	October 27, 2001
When the gang arrives in Turkey, they are met by a troublesome Imhotep. Later, Alex begins having visions of a girl named Ishi.
6	6	"Orb of Aten"	Nick DuBois	November 3, 2001
Imhotep races to beat the O'Connells to New York City, where he plans a dangerous "empowering" ceremony at the Statue of Liberty.
7	7	"The Black Forest"	Elaine Zicree; Marc Scott Zicree	November 10, 2001
Imhotep comes across a book containing a mathematical formula which tells the location of the Scrolls. Imhotep has the book, but Evy knows the only man alive that is brilliant enough to understand it: her old professor, Albert Einstein. Colin and Imhotep, knowing the same thing, kidnap Einstein and hold him in a forest, which Imhotep enchants to bring the trees to life. Alex frees Einstein, who tells Evy he has got the formula. Colin and Imhotep think they have the answer, as Einstein had left an answer on the blackboard. They do not know that the answer is just the opposite of the real one. Einstein has been a teacher long enough to know that he should never put the real answers where anyone can read them.
8	8	"The Cloud People"	Marty Isenberg; Robert N. Skir	November 17, 2001
The Manacle gives Alex a vision of him nearly being killed in a cave-in just before he can find the Scrolls of Thebes. Later on, Rick, Alex, and Evy are exploring caves, which are at the exact location referenced in the Roman Tablets. They have reached a dead end in their search here. The next place they are going, based on Alex's vision, is Lake Titicaca, in Peru, a place Rick has been to before. The British Museum's director, Arthur Fenwick, is aware of Colin's activities. Colin has broken into the museum and has Fenwick tied up. The team goes to Peru, finds the mountain Alex talked about, and begins the climb to the top. Tiga and Pilow are Cloud People and they meet the team high up the mountain. Alex and some of the Cloud People children are playing when Imhotep shows up. He uses his powers to cause a cave-in and rock slide, endangering the kids, but stalks off after the parents. Alex finds the cave he had seen in his vision, thanks to the Manacle's powers. Imhotep is defeated and the Scrolls are retrieved, but they turn out to not be the Scrolls of Thebes.
9	9	"Fear Itself"	Steven Melching	December 1, 2001
Genghis Khan had stored his treasure in Mogoca in Asia, including the scrolls. When the team arrives, they find only a handful of items. The rest was confiscated by the government and is in the Oktober Palace near Leningrad, over two thousand miles away. With Imhotep hot on their trail, the team boards the Zephyr and heads toward the palace. While exploring the palace, Alex finds Russian Stacking dolls. Inside is a fear demon, called a Gogle, which is released by Alex's playing with the dolls. The fear demon invades the minds of the team, one at a time, making them see things they fear, and feeding off those fears. As they become more terrified, the demon grows, and the fears become worse. Evy sees herself as an old woman, Rick sees the corridors changing, becoming longer, while Jonathan is attacked by a painting. After defeating the Gogle, the Manacle lights the way to a chest that contains part of the Scrolls. Alex has an idea, and puts the Gogle in the chest. Imhotep shows up and demands the chest, thinking it still contains the Scrolls. They hand it over, and watch. The Gogle may have been defeated by the team, but not by Imhotep and Colin, as Imhotep is taken by the Pharaoh's soldiers. As the team leaves, the Gogle is growing larger, and Imhotep is placed in a coffin.
10	10	"The Boy Who Would Be King"	Thomas Pugsley; Greg Klein	December 8, 2001
The team travels to China on another trail, learning that the Scrolls may have been presented to Kublai Khan as a gift. The only way to research this is to get into the Forbidden City. A boy being chased by soldiers is helped by Alex, who hides the boy under a table. In gratitude, the boy - who is actually Emperor Jin-Wu - invites the team inside the palace. Evy finds a reference to Marco Polo presenting gifts to Kublai, but cannot make out part of the translation. Jin-Wu reads it, and tells them he will get Lin Chou to translate for them. Jin-Wu grabs Alex and they leave the palace quickly, heading towards the spot the Scrolls may be. In their haste, Jin-Wu and Alex release the dragon that protects the Hun shrine. Jin-Wu refuses to admit he did anything wrong and when the team says otherwise, he has them locked up. Lin Chou promptly allows them to escape. Jin-Wu and Alex work together to seal the dragon, and Alex learns how to use the Manacle to achieve telekinesis.
11	11	"Howl"	Thomas Pugsley; Greg Klein	February 2, 2002
The team is on the run from an ice monster in Greenland. Alex defeats it with the Manacle's help, and they return to the British Museum of Antiquities, where Evy presents the Director with their find: a chalice. With a lead presented - quite by accident - they head to Ireland aboard the Zephyr. Colin and Imhotep enter the Museum and confront the Director. The Director informs Colin that he is not permitted inside, as he stole the Book of the Dead. The team is in a village and they later travel on the road with a horse-drawn carriage. When the road becomes too rough for the horses, they are abandoned, and the team continues on foot. Shortly after, they are surrounded by wolves; they escape, but Rick is bitten by one. Rick is made a werewolf due to the bite and joins the other wolves outside. The team has until midnight to turn Rick back into his old self, or he will remain a wolf permanently. To save Rick, he must want to return, and it can only be Alex who brings him back, as Alex is his bloodline. The problem is, the werewolves also know his bloodline, and will try to make Alex one of them. Alex, using the Manacle, helps Rick return to normal.
12	12	"The Puzzle"	Thomas Pugsley; Greg Klein	February 9, 2002
Imhotep finds the first piece of the Puzzle of Horus, only for it to be stolen by Ardeth Bay. Meanwhile in London, the Zephyr is parked, and Alex is playing inside with his friend Simon Montgomery. Simon hides behind the fence and watches Alex use the Manacle to lift trashcans, but drops them when Simon shows himself. Alex ends up telling him everything. Rick later comes in with a telegram from Ardeth. He tells her they have found the Puzzle, and need to come to Egypt immediately. Ardeth gives Alex the piece, which gives him the location of the second piece when held near the Manacle. The group finds the second piece and confronts Imhotep, only to find that he has destroyed the Zephyr. Unbeknownst to them, Alex takes the pieces out of the box and slips them into his pockets. When Imhotep finds that the box is empty, he becomes enraged and sends a sandworm to attack Alex and Simon. The sandworm eats Alex and Simon, but they manage to escape with Ardeth's help. Jonathan has found the final Puzzle piece, and with Simon's help, the Puzzle is put together. It shows them a hologram of the Eiffel Tower in Paris.
13	13	"The Maze"	Thomas Pugsley; Greg Klein	February 16, 2002
Simon has returned home, while Ardeth, Evy, Rick, Alex, and Jonathan are at the top of the Eiffel Tower in Paris, using the Puzzle of Horus and telescopes to pinpoint the location of the Scrolls, which is the Paris Opera House. As the team searches the French catacombs, Evy is kidnapped by a Minotaur. The Minotaur reveals to Evy that he is the guardian of the Scrolls and was transformed into his current form to enhance his power. The group is attacked by Imhotep, who grabs Alex and the Scrolls. He intends to use a spell found in the Scrolls to remove the Manacle from Alex. However, Alex uses the Manacle to bring a torch under the Scrolls and set them on fire, destroying them. Because he saved Ardeth's life, Ardeth decides that he will train Alex to be a Medjai.

=== Season 2 (2003) ===
No. overall	No. in season	Title	Written by	Original release date
14	1	"A New Beginning: Part I"	Thomas Pugsley; Greg Klein	February 15, 2003
Alex begins his Medjal training with Ardeth Bay and later learns that Imhotep is not only alive but is also planning to resurrect his long-lost love, an evil high priestess named Anck Su Namun.
15	2	"A New Beginning: Part II"	Thomas Pugsley; Greg Klein	February 22, 2003
A mortally injured Evy is brought back to life, but in the process the soul of Princess Nefertiri begins to overtake her.
16	3	"The Dark Medjai"	Steven Melching	March 1, 2003
The legendary "Dark Medjai" kidnaps Ardeth, and Alex and Yanit - another initiate at the Medjai Academy - race to save the day.
17	4	"Like Father, Like Son"	Thomas Pugsley; Greg Klein	March 8, 2003
Alex's new friendship with an archeological mercenary leads to tension in the O'Connell home and the discovery of family secrets.
18	5	"A Fair to Remember"	William Forrest Cluverius	March 15, 2003
The Eye of Shiva, a prismatic egg that can turn the skies to fire, goes missing from a temple in Sri Lanka, and the heroes tract it to the Chicago International fair.
19	6	"The Enemy of My Enemy"	Marty Isenberg; Robert N. Skir	March 22, 2003
Imhotep and the O'Connells hunt for the powerful Cloak of Isis, and Weasler summons two half-bird/half-woman creatures to help with the quest.
20	7	"The Cold"	Thomas Pugsley; Greg Klein	March 29, 2003
Weasler gets a taste of power and turns it against Imhotep, hoping to beat everyone to a powerful and coveted artifact called the Trident of Voth.
21	8	"Time Before Time"	Greg Weisman	April 12, 2003
Imhotep uses a mystical time machine to change history and become the possessor of the Manacle of Osiris - and ruler of the world. Alex is the only one who remembers what happened and must find a way repair the timeline before everything changes in the pupil of Alex's eye.
22	9	"Spring of Evil"	Steven Melching	April 26, 2003
Imhotep joins forces with Nizam Toth to crush Ardeth Bay and change Alex into their apprentice.
23	10	"Trio"	Tony Schillaci	May 10, 2003
Alex, Yanit and a Medjai initiate search for Imhotep, who has merged with an ancient spider creature known as Nihansan. Meanwhile, Alex discovers that whenever he uses the Manacle its powers start to permanently bond to him.
24	11	"Old Friends"	Thomas Pugsley; Greg Klein	May 17, 2003
Jonathan and the O'Connells travel to Thailand to search for a missing friend and discover that Anck Su Namun has used the Ring of Sukothai to drain the life force out of the woman.
25	12	"Just Another Piece of Jewelry"	Marty Isenberg	May 31, 2003
Imhotep and Weasler discover a centuries-old Medjai journal that leads them to "the Medallion of the Medjai", an ancient artifact whose power rivals that of the Manacle of Osiris.
26	13	"The Reckoning"	Thomas Pugsley; Greg Klein	June 7, 2003
Having traveled to Duat, the O'Connells and their allies must overcome treacherous obstacles if they are going to stop Imhotep from raising the Army of the Dead. Meanwhile, Alex discovers his true destiny as he is revealed to be the reincarnated Eygtian god, Horus, and the new Prime Medjai.

== Reception ==
The series received positive reviews from critics with praise given to the writing, animation, and Marquette's voice performance as Alex O'Connell. In February 2003, Kids' WB considered The Mummy, which was airing its second season at the time, one of the network's "breakout hits".

== Merchandise ==
=== Video games ===
A video game based on The Mummy: The Animated Series was developed by Ubisoft, who acquired the rights from Universal Studios Consumer Products Group to produce games based on the brand. Ubisoft Milan developed the game for Game Boy Advance platform and was released in November 2002.

HIP Interactive developed a new game based on The Mummy: The Animated Series for PlayStation 2 and PC, with the assistance of All In The Game LTD. Corey Johnson reprised his role as "Mr. Daniels" from the 1999 film The Mummy. According to casting director Phil Morris, Johnson was brought in to help reproduce the same production values of the original films and television show. The game was released in October 2004.

=== Home media release ===
In October 2002, Universal released The Mummy: Quest of the Lost Scrolls on VHS and DVD. Dubbed a "feature length adventure", the film was a mash up of the first episode of the series, and the last two episodes from season one.

Universal Pictures Home Entertainment released the entire series on DVD in Region 1 in three-volume sets in 2008. They were released in Canada on July 22 and in the U.S. on December 16.

== See also ==
- Mummies Alive!
