= Cory Lerios =

American pianist and vocalist

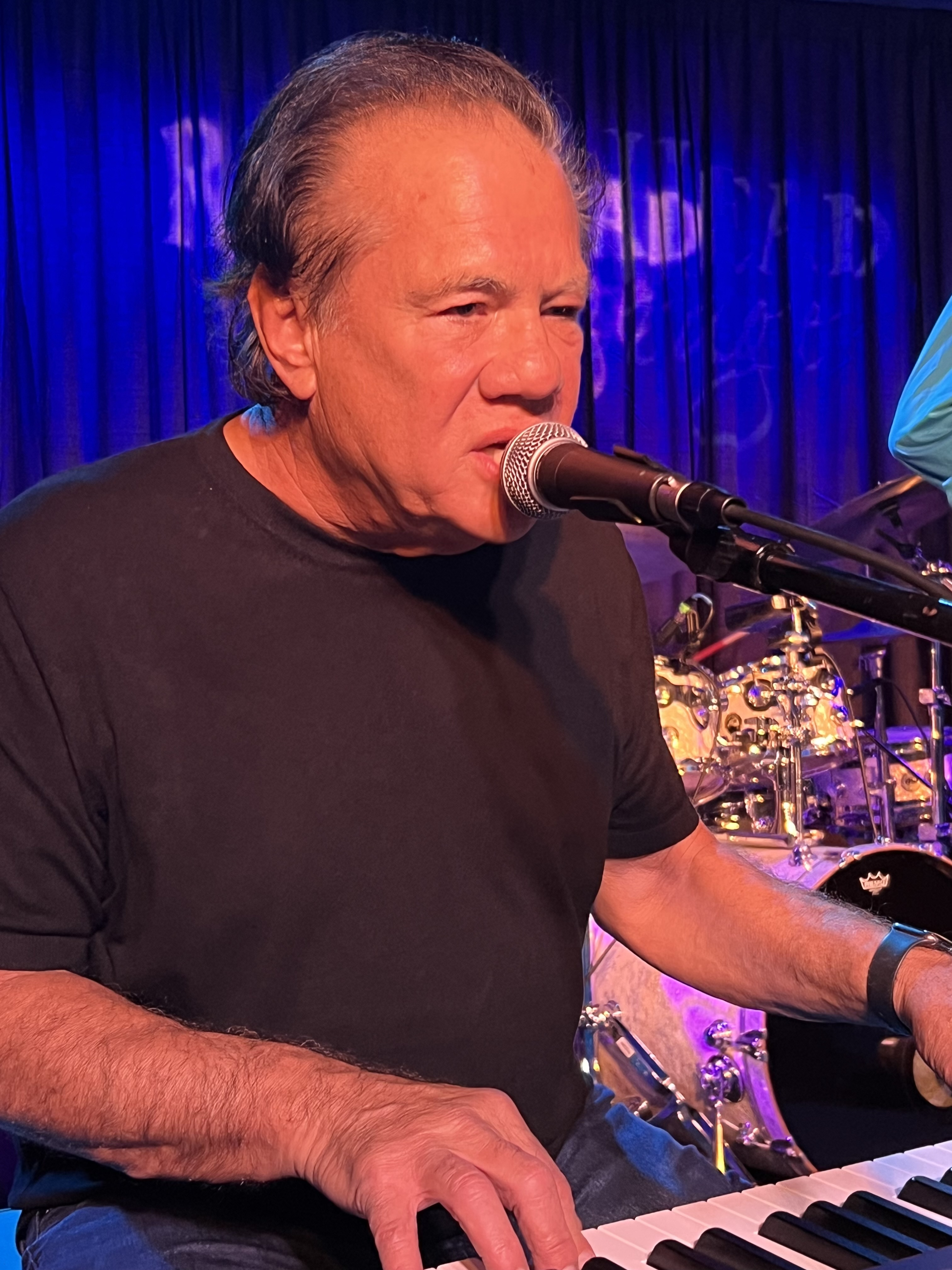
- Lerios performing in October 2023 at Rams Head in Annapolis, MD

Background information
- Born: Cory Charles Lerios; February 12, 1951 (age 75); Palo Alto, California United States
- Genres: Rock; pop rock
- Occupations: Musician; composer; producer
- Instruments: Vocals; keyboards; piano; synthesizers
- Years active: 1971–present
- Labels: Warner Bros. Records; A&M
- Website: Cory Lerios Official; Pablo Cruise Official

Cory Charles Lerios (born February 12, 1951) is an American pianist and vocalist. He is a founding member of the platinum-record-selling soft rock band Pablo Cruise, and since the mid-1980s he has scored music for film and television.

== History ==
Lerios was born in Palo Alto, California and entered the music industry in 1971 with the San Francisco Bay area band Stoneground. At the time, Stoneground was signed with Warner Bros., and Lerios was 20 years old. After leaving the band in 1973, Lerios, along with fellow Stoneground members Steve Price and David Jenkins, formed Pablo Cruise. In 1975, they released their first album, self-titled Pablo Cruise, for A&M Records. The band completed several national tours, released seven albums, and sold millions of records before disbanding in 1986.

Having been one of the primary songwriters for Pablo Cruise, ("Love Will Find a Way", "Whatcha Gonna Do?"), Lerios tried composing for film and television. His first major production was One Crazy Summer, a 1986 comedy. Later, Lerios partnered with John D'Andrea to start a music production studio called Lerios D'Andrea Music Works, based in Los Angeles. Together they wrote and produced a number of themes, songs and dramatic and comedic scores for TV shows including Baywatch (300 episodes), Days of Our Lives, Diagnosis: Murder, Max Headroom and The Land Before Time.

In 2012 Lerios produced a live DVD and CD for Pablo Cruise entitled It's Good To Be Live!, released through Sony Entertainment. Pablo Cruise released another live CD through Sony Entertainment in 2013. As of August 2014, Lerios was scoring and producing the music for the international TV series SAF3 and touring with the original members of Pablo Cruise. In 2015 Lerios released an EP, If I Could Change Anything It Would Be You!, under the name Cory Charles.

== Personal life ==
Lerios lives in Thousand Oaks, California and he and his wife of 43 years have 3 sons, including a 27-year-old (as of January 2025) son who lost his home in the Palisades Fire.

== Credits ==
=== Television ===
- 2014/15 SAF3 (TV series) Episodes, Music Supervision
- 2013/14 SAF3 (TV series) Episodes
- 2013 "Men At Work"
- 2013 Ernst & Young Entrepreneur Awards Programme
- 2013 "Bench" International Promos
- 2011 Yu-Gi-Oh! Main Title Theme & Episodes
- 2010 Ernst & Young Entrepreneur Awards Programme
- 2009 Hope For Children, Documentary
- 2009 Terrell Lloyd, Documentary
- 2009 GeoTrax Animated Series Theme/Pilot
- 2009 Ernst & Young Entrepreneur of the Year Awards Theme
- 2008 The Land Before Time: The Series
- 2006 Choose Your Own Adventure: The Abominable Snowman
- 2004/5 ToddWorld
- 2004 The Best TV Shows That Never Were
- 2004 Hot Wheels AcceleRacers
- 2004 E! Diary of An Affair
- 2003 Baywatch: "Hawaiian Wedding"
- 2001 The Mummy
- 2000 Murder in the Mirror
- 2000/2001 Intimate Portrait (TV series)
- 1999 The Test of Love (movie)
- 1999 Diagnosis: Murder (series)
- 1999 A Secret Life (movie)
- 1998 A Marriage of Convenience (movie)
- 1998 Martial Law (TV series)
- 1998 Baywatch: "White Thunder at Glacier Bay" (movie)
- 1997 Baywatch: "Assault on Devil's Island" (movie)
- 1997 Steel Chariots
- 1997 In the Line of Duty: Blaze of Glory (movie)
- 1996 Gone in a Heartbeat (movie)
- 1996 Fall Into Darkness (movie)
- 1996 Angel Flight Down
- 1995/96 Flipper (series)
- 1995/96 Baywatch Nights (series)
- 1995 Baywatch: Forbidden Paradise (movie)
- 1993/94 Mighty Max (TV series)
- 1993/94/95 Days of Our Lives (daytime soap opera)
- 1994 Deadly Vows (movie)
- 1990 E.A.R.T.H. Force (series)
- 1989/2001 Baywatch. All 11 seasons (theme & 300 episodes)
- 1987 Max Headroom
- Hard Copy

=== Film ===
- Disney Princess: A Christmas of Enchantment (2005) (Direct-To-Video)
- Street Fighter II: The Animated Movie (1994)
- Thunder in Paradise (1993) (V)
- The Tower (1993) (TV)
- Boiling Point (1993/I)
- Beyond the Law (1992)
- The Entertainers (1991) (TV)
- Child's Play 3 (1991)
- Night Angel (1990)
- Police Story: Burnout (1988) (TV)
- One Crazy Summer (1986)
- Dracula A.D. 1972 (1972) (as a member of Stoneground)

=== Themes ===
- CBS LOGO: theme: CBS
- CBS PRODUCTIONS LOGO: theme: CBS
- STARZ LOGO: theme: STARZ
- DIRECT T.V.: DIRECT T.V.
- TNT SUNDAY CLASSICS MOVIE: theme: Turner Broadcasting
- TNT (TV channel)|TNT FEATURE FILMS: series & theme: Turner Broadcasting
- RAVE: Arts & Entertainment
- CBS TUESDAY NIGHT MOVIES: theme: CBS
- CBS SUNDAY NIGHT MOVIES: theme: CBS
- A & E MYSTERY MOVIES: A&E NETWORK
- 16th ANNUAL CABLE ACE AWARDS: TNT: Producer: David Lawrence
- San Disk LOGO:Theme: Commercial

== Discography ==
=== Pablo Cruise ===
Year	Album	U.S.	RIAA certification and additional information
1975	Pablo Cruise	174	debut album
1976	Lifeline	139	
1977	A Place in the Sun	19	2× Platinum, Gold in Canada
1978	Worlds Away	6	2× Platinum, Gold in Australia, Gold in Canada
1979	Part of the Game	39	Canadian Gold
1981	Reflector	34	
1983	Out of Our Hands	-	last album of new material
2001	The Best of Pablo Cruise	-	Greatest Hits Compilation

=== Singles ===
Year	Single	U.S.
1977	"Whatcha Gonna Do?"	6
1977	"A Place in the Sun"	42
1978	"Don't Want to Live Without it"	19
1978	"Love Will Find a Way"	6
1978	"Never Had a Love"	87
1979	"I Go to Rio"	46
1979	"I Want You Tonight"	19
1981	"Cool Love"	13
1981	"Slip Away"	75
1983	"Will You, Won't You"	107

=== Additional discography (writer or performer) ===
- Stoneground 3, Stoneground - Warner Bros. Records
- Last days of the Filmore, Various Artists w/ Stoneground - Fillmore Records
- Nadia's Themes, Various Artists - A&M Records
- George Benson, "Teaser" - Warner Bros. Records
- The Neville Brothers, "Forever Tonight"
- Melba Moore and Ben E. King, "A Test Of Time"
- Santana, "She Can’t Let It Go"
- Christina Milian, "Call Me, Beep Me"
- Smokey Robinson, "It's a Colorful World"
- Plan 9, "Whatcha Gonna Do?"

=== Keyboardist or programmer ===
- Geoff Byrd
- Whitney Houston
- Kenny G
- Santana
- The Neville Brothers
- Narada Michael Walden
- Smokey Robinson

== Awards and nominations ==
Daytime Emmy awards:

- Won, 1997, Outstanding Music Direction and Composition for a Drama Series for: "Days of Our Lives" (shared with Ken Corday, Brent Nelson, Dominic Messinger, John D'Andrea, Amy Burkhard Evans, and Stephen Reinhardt)
- Emmy Nomination, Days of Our Lives ’94 ‘95
- Emmy Nomination, Days of Our Lives ’93 ‘94
- Emmy Honors, Jay Meisel Documentary

ASCAP awards:

- Won, 1996, Top TV Series for "Baywatch"
- Won, 1997, Top TV Series for "Baywatch"
- Won, 1997, Most Performed Underscore

BMI awards

- BMI Most Performed Song, Whatcha Gonna Do? Pablo Cruise
- BMI Most Performed Song, Love Will Find a Way Pablo Cruise
- BMI Most Performed Song, Cool Love Pablo Cruise
- BMI Most Performed Song, Don’t Want to Live Without It Pablo Cruise

TELLY AWARD: "Hope For Children"

== External sources ==
- Cory Lerios Official Website
- Pablo Cruise Official Website
- Cory Lerios at IMDb
