= En plats i solen =

En plats i solen may refer to:

- En plats i solen (Lustans Lakejer album), by Lustans Lakejer (1982)
- En plats i solen (Grönwalls album) (1994)
- En plats i solen (Kent album) (2010)

...och en plats i Solen, a line of the 1986 Kikki Danielsson song "Papaya Coconut"

== See also ==
- A Place in the Sun (disambiguation)
- Platz an der Sonne
