= Worlds Away (Pablo Cruise album) =

Studio album by Pablo Cruise
- Released: May 26, 1978
- Recorded: February–March 1978
- Studios: The Record Plant (Sausalito); Redwing Sound (Los Angeles)
- Genres: Pop rock, soft rock, yacht rock
- Length: 39:55
- Label: A&M
- Producer: Bill Schnee

Pablo Cruise chronology
A Place in the Sun (1977)	Worlds Away (1978)	Part of the Game (1979)

Professional ratings
Review scores
Source	Rating
AllMusic	3.5/5 stars
Christgau's Record Guide	C

Worlds Away is the fourth and most successful album by the California soft rock group Pablo Cruise. The album charted higher than any other of the band's albums, reaching No. 6 in the United States. Three singles were released from the album: "Love Will Find a Way", "Don't Want to Live Without It" and "I Go to Rio", reaching Nos. 6, 21, and 46, respectively. The title track, "Worlds Away" was not released as a single but remains a favorite among many fans of the band today.

Before the album was recorded, original bassist Bud Cockrell left the band. He was replaced by Bruce Day.

== Track listing ==
All tracks are written by David Jenkins and Cory Lerios, except where noted.

Side one
No.	Title	Writer(s)	Length
1.	"Worlds Away"	Lerios; Bruce Day; Bob Brown	3:45
2.	"Love Will Find a Way"		4:11
3.	"Family Man"		4:58
4.	"Runnin'"		6:30

Side two
No.	Title	Writer(s)	Length
5.	"Don't Want to Live Without It"		4:37
6.	"You're Out to Lose"	Jenkins; Lerios; Michael McDonald	5:23
7.	"Always Be Together"		5:01
8.	"Sailing to Paradise"	Jenkins; Lerios; David Batteau	3:26
9.	"I Go to Rio"	Peter Allen; Adrienne Anderson	3:59
Total length:			39:55

== Charts ==
Chart (1978)	Peak position
Australia (Kent Music Report)	7
US Top LPs and Tape (Billboard)	6

== Personnel ==
=== Pablo Cruise ===
- David Jenkins – guitars, lead vocals
- Cory Lerios – piano, keyboards, synthesizers, synthesizer programming, backing vocals
- Bruce Day – bass, backing vocals
- Steve Price – drums, percussion

==== Additional musicians ====
- Mike Porcaro – bass
- Steve Porcaro – synthesizers, synthesizer programming
- James Newton Howard – synthesizers, synthesizer programming

=== Technical ===
- Produced and engineered by Bill Schnee
- Assistant engineers – Jim Scheffler (at The Record Plant) and Greg Price (at Redwing Sound)
- Second engineer – Steve Fontano
- Mixed by Bill Schnee at Studio 55 and The Sound Factory (Los Angeles, CA)
- Assistnant mixing engineer – Gabe Veltri
- Mastered by Doug Sax and Mike Reese at The Mastering Lab (Los Angeles, CA)
- Art direction – Roland Young
- Design – Chuck Beeson
- Mirror etching – Karen Louise Haskins
- Back cover photography – Jim McCrary
- Inner sleeve photography – Aaron Rapoport and Mark Hanouer
- Management – Bob Brown
