= A Place in the Sun (Pablo Cruise song) =

Single by Pablo Cruise

from the album A Place in the Sun
- B-side: "El Verano"
- Released: September 1977
- Genre: Rock
- Length: 3:40 (single version); 4:48 (album version)
- Label: A&M
- Songwriters: Bud Cockrell, Cory Lerios
- Producer: Bill Schnee

Pablo Cruise singles chronology
"Whatcha Gonna Do?" (1977)	"A Place in the Sun" (1977)	"Don't Want to Live Without It" (1978)

"A Place in the Sun" is a song by American rock group Pablo Cruise from their album of the same name, A Place in the Sun, in 1977. It was released as a single and reached #42 on the Billboard Hot 100 and #36 in Canada.
