= Bud Cockrell =

American musician and singer-songwriter

- Born: James Ray Cockrell; March 28, 1950; Greenville, Mississippi, USA
- Died: March 6, 2010 (aged 59) Hinds County, Mississippi, USA
- Genres: Rock and roll, blues, soul
- Occupations: Singer, songwriter
- Instrument: Bass guitar
- Labels: A&M Records; Columbia Records
- Formerly of: Pablo Cruise; It's a Beautiful Day; Cockrell-Santos Band; Sons of Champlin

James Ray "Bud" Cockrell (March 28, 1950 – March 6, 2010) was an American musician and singer-songwriter, best known as the original bassist and one of the lead vocalists of the San Francisco rock band Pablo Cruise. Cockrell was in the band from its inception in 1973 but left before the release of their most successful album, Worlds Away, to form the duo Cockrell & Santos with his wife, Pattie Santos. He was replaced by bassist Bruce Day.

== Biography ==
James Ray Cockrell was born in the Mississippi Delta where his father, Corbet Cockrell, and his uncle, Clint, taught him to play the guitar and bass guitar. Cockrell and his father played in bars throughout the Delta.

The Bay Area band It's a Beautiful Day, which featured singer Pattie Santos, recruited Cockrell in 1972 to serve as a replacement for the group's departing lead vocalist, David LaFlamme. The band broke up the following year, at which time he helped co-found Pablo Cruise. In 1974 he married Santos.

With the help of a new manager, Bob Brown (later to manage Huey Lewis and the News), Pablo Cruise signed to A&M Records and released their debut album in 1975. The group's second album achieved slightly greater commercial success but it was their third release, A Place in the Sun, that became the turning point in the band's career as they finally entered the mainstream music scene with the hit singles "Whatcha Gonna Do?" and title track "A Place in the Sun" (co-written by Cockrell). Released in 1977, the album reached No. 19 on the Billboard 200.

Cockrell decided to leave Pablo Cruise that same year to work with his wife, and the pair, known as Cockrell & Santos, created an album of their own titled New Beginnings. Produced by Bob Monaco, this project was released on A&M Records in 1978. Featured guests on the album included Airto Moreira and his wife Flora Purim of Return To Forever, and jazz fusion bassist Jaco Pastorius of Weather Report.

In between his work in the Cockrell-Santos Band, he also did a brief stint as the singer with Sons of Champlin from 1977 to 1979 with the departure of front man and founder Bill Champlin.

Cockrell was affectionately known as the "Rock and Roller" but also played pop, blues, soul, funk, fusion, gospel and country music, and wrote many of the songs performed by the bands he played in.

Pattie Santos was killed in a car crash near Geyserville in Sonoma County, California on December 14, 1989.

Cockrell spent his last years living in the Delta on dialysis, where he died on March 6, 2010, due to complications from diabetes.

== Discography ==
=== It's a Beautiful Day ===
- It's A Beautiful Day...Today (Columbia Records, 1973)

=== Pablo Cruise ===
- Pablo Cruise (A&M Records, 1975)
- Lifeline (A&M Records, 1976)
- A Place In The Sun (A&M Records, 1977)

=== Cockrell & Santos ===
- New Beginnings (A&M Records, 1978)
