= Whatcha Gonna Do? (song) =

Single by Pablo Cruise

from the album A Place in the Sun
- B-side: "Atlanta June"
- Released: March 1977
- Genre: Pop
- Length: 3:29 (single version); 4:21 (album version); 4:59 (disco version)
- Label: A&M
- Songwriter: David Jenkins / Cory Lerios
- Producer: Bill Schnee

Pablo Cruise singles chronology
"Crystal" (1976)	"Whatcha Gonna Do?" (1977)	"A Place in the Sun" (1977)

"Whatcha Gonna Do?" is a song by American rock group Pablo Cruise. This song was written by David Jenkins and Cory Lerios, two of the band's members. "Whatcha Gonna Do?" was a track from their album A Place in the Sun in 1977.

== Chart performance ==
It was released as a single and reached #6 on the Billboard Hot 100. "Whatcha Gonna Do" was also a minor hit on the Billboard's Hot Soul Singles chart, where it peaked at #46.

In Canada, "Whatcha Gonna Do?" reached #1 on the pop singles chart. It is ranked as the 24th biggest Canadian hit of 1977. Billboard ranked it as the #16 song of 1977.

== Chart history ==
=== Weekly charts ===
Chart (1977)	Peak position
Canada RPM Top Singles	1
U.S. Billboard Hot 100	6
U.S. Billboard Hot Soul Singles	46
U.S. Cash Box Top 100	3

=== Year-end charts ===
Chart (1977)	Rank
Canada	24
U.S. Billboard Hot 100	16
U.S. Cash Box	41
