= David Jenkins (musician) =

American singer-songwriter and guitarist (born 1947)

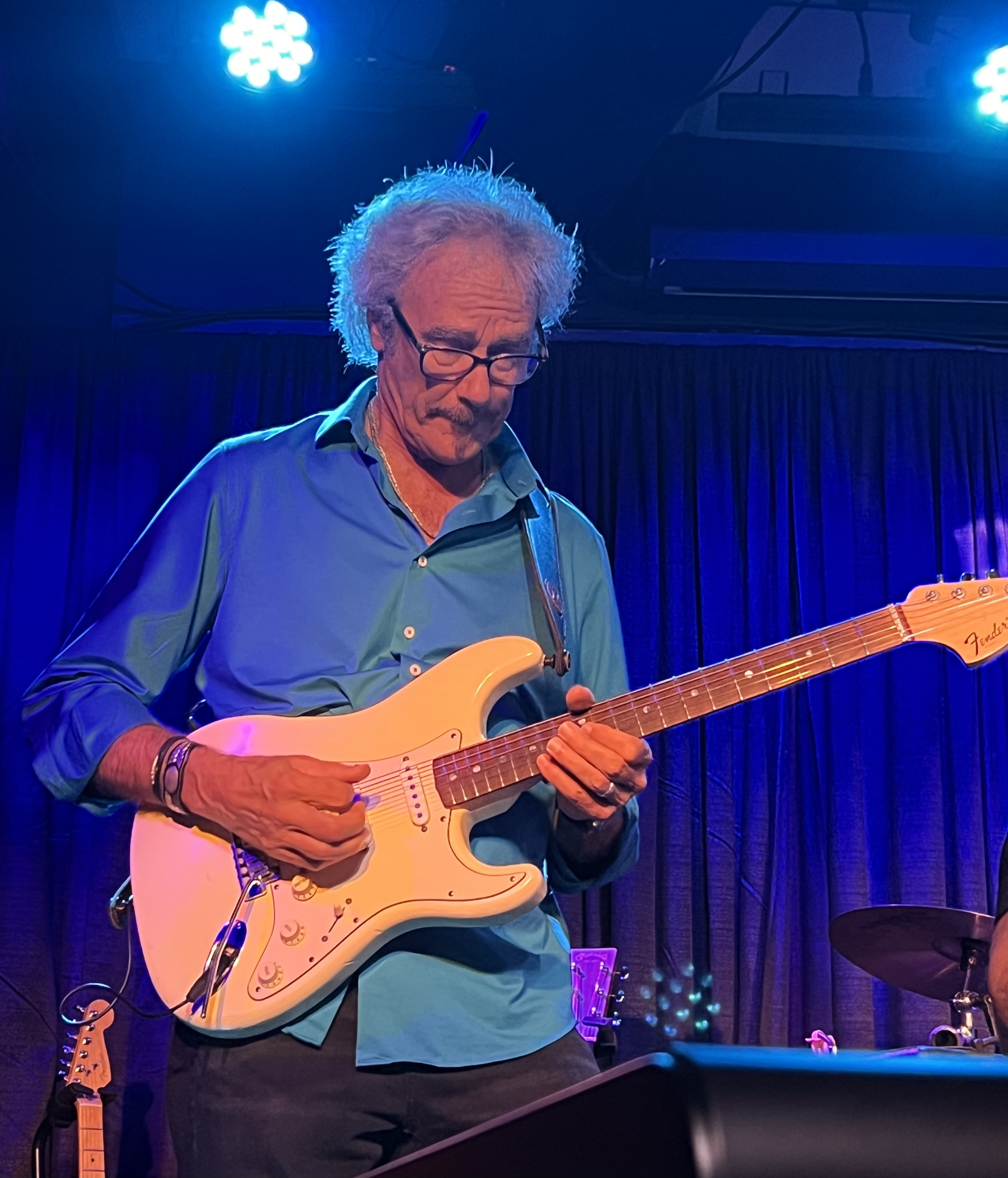
- Jenkins performing at Rams Head in Annapolis, MD in October 2023

Background information
- Born: David Michael Jenkins; August 29, 1947 (age 78)
- Genres: Smooth rock, easy listening
- Occupation: Musician
- Instruments: Vocals, guitar
- Years active: 1973-present

David Michael Jenkins (born August 29, 1947) is an American singer-songwriter and guitarist, best known as the lead singer and guitarist for the California smooth rock band Pablo Cruise. Jenkins was a member of the band at its conception in 1973, and stayed until they disbanded in 1986. In 1996, Jenkins, Bud Cockrell and two new members reformed Pablo Cruise. He was also a member of the country rock band Southern Pacific between 1987 and 1989.

Throughout the late 1980s, as the original lead vocalist, Jenkins continued touring in the world of country music, with Southern Pacific. They racked up hits including "Midnight Highway", "New Shade of Blue" and "Honey I Dare You". The band toured all over the United States. In 1994, Jenkins teamed up with the native Hawaiian singer, Kapono Beamer, and they released the album Cruisin' on Hawaiian Time. Together they were nominated for the Hoku Award for Album of the year.

As of 2019, he was joined by Cory Lerios, co founder of Pablo Cruise, Steve Price (original member), with Larry Antonio and Robbie Wyckoff, as they toured mainly in California.
