= Monterey Pop Festival set list =

This is a list of the performers at the Monterey Pop Festival, held June 16 to June 18, 1967 at the Monterey County Fairgrounds in Monterey, California.

There were five separate shows during the three-day festival (one on Friday night, two on Saturday and two on Sunday), with each performance approximately four hours in duration. Festival attendees could buy a full weekend ticket or tickets for the five separate shows. The showground arena, where the performances took place, had 5,850 seats, but many attendees had floor and perimeter standing tickets, allowing between 7,000 and 10,000 to witness the performances. Tickets were also sold that permitted entry to the fairgrounds without access to the performance arena. Total crowd estimates for the entire festival have ranged from 25,000 to 90,000 people in and around the festival grounds. All of the artists performed to a packed house, except Ravi Shankar, whose audience was about 80% capacity following a rainy morning.

== Friday, June 16 (evening) ==
=== The Association ===
Introduced by John Phillips.

1. "Enter the Young"
2. "The Machine"/"Along Comes Mary"
3. "All Is Mine"
4. "Poison Ivy"
5. "Windy"

Note: Set list is incomplete.

=== The Paupers ===
Introduced by David Crosby.

1. "Magic People"
2. "Think I Care"
3. "Tudor Impressions"
4. "Simple Deed"
5. "Let Me Be"
6. "Dr. Feelgood/Bass Solo/Dr. Feelgood"

=== Lou Rawls ===
Introduced by Peter Tork.

1. "Love Is a Hurtin' Thing"
2. "Dead End Street"
3. "Tobacco Road"
4. "On a Clear Day (You Can See Forever)"
5. "Autumn Leaves"
6. "The Shadow of Your Smile"
7. "It Was a Very Good Year"
8. "On Broadway"
9. "St. James Infirmary Blues"
10. "In the Evening (When the Sun Goes Down)"

Note: Set list is incomplete.

=== Beverley ===
Introduced by Paul Simon.

1. "Sweet Joy" (solo)
2. "Sweet Honesty" (solo)
3. "Picking Up the Sunshine" (with "house" band)

=== Johnny Rivers ===
1. "Help Me, Rhonda"
2. "Memphis, Tennessee"
3. "Mountain of Love"
4. "Midnight Special"
5. "Do What You Gotta Do"
6. "Tunesmith"
7. "Baby I Need Your Loving"
8. "Poor Side of Town"
9. "Secret Agent Man"
10. "Help!" (performed twice during set)

=== Eric Burdon and the Animals ===
Introduced by Chet Helms.

1. "San Franciscan Nights"
2. "Gin House Blues"
3. "Hey Gyp"
4. "Paint It, Black"

=== Simon and Garfunkel ===
Introduced by John Phillips.

1. "Homeward Bound"
2. "At the Zoo"
3. "The 59th Street Bridge Song (Feelin' Groovy)"
4. "For Emily, Whenever I May Find Her"
5. "The Sound of Silence"
6. "Benedictus"
7. "Punky's Dilemma"

== Saturday, June 17 (afternoon) ==
=== Canned Heat ===
Introduced by John Phillips.

1. "Rollin' and Tumblin'"
2. "Dust My Broom"
3. "Bullfrog Blues"

Note: Set list is incomplete.

=== Big Brother and the Holding Company (with Janis Joplin) ===
Introduced by Chet Helms.

1. "Down on Me"
2. "Combination of the Two"
3. "Harry"
4. "Roadblock"
5. "Ball and Chain"

=== Country Joe and the Fish ===
1. "Not So Sweet Martha Lorraine"
2. "I-Feel-Like-I'm-Fixin'-to-Die Rag"
3. "The Bomb Song"
4. "Section 43"

=== Al Kooper ===
Introduced by Paul Butterfield.

1. "I Can't Keep from Cryin' Sometimes"
2. "Wake Me, Shake Me"

=== The Butterfield Blues Band ===
1. "Look Over Yonder Wall"
2. "Mystery Train"
3. "Born in Chicago"
4. "Double Trouble"
5. "Mary Ann"
6. "Droppin' Out"
7. "One More Heartache"
8. "Driftin' Blues"

Note: Set list is incomplete.

=== Quicksilver Messenger Service ===
1. "Dino's Song (All I Ever Wanted to Do)"
2. "If You Live"
3. "Acapulco Gold and Silver"
4. "Too Long"
5. "Who Do You Love?"

Lineup: Jim Murray, Gary Duncan, John Cipollina, David Freiberg, Greg Elmore.

=== Steve Miller Band ===
1. "Living in the USA"
2. "Mercury Blues"
3. "Super Shuffle"

=== The Electric Flag ===
Introduced by David Crosby.

1. "Groovin' Is Easy"
2. "Over-Lovin' You"
3. "Night Time Is the Right Time"
4. "Wine"

== Saturday, June 17 (evening) ==
=== Moby Grape ===
Introduced by Tom Smothers.

1. "Indifference"
2. "Mr. Blues"
3. "Sitting by the Window"
4. "Omaha"
5. "Fall on You"
6. "Hey Grandma"
7. "Lazy Me"

=== Hugh Masekela ===
1. "Here, There and Everywhere"
2. "Society's Child"
3. "Bajabula Bonke (Healing Song)"

Note: Set list is incomplete.

=== The Byrds ===
Introduced by Mike Bloomfield.

1. "Renaissance Fair"
2. "Have You Seen Her Face"
3. "Hey Joe"
4. "He Was a Friend of Mine"
5. "Lady Friend"
6. "Chimes of Freedom"
7. "I Know My Rider"
8. "So You Want to Be a Rock 'n' Roll Star" (featuring Hugh Masekela on trumpet)

=== Laura Nyro ===
1. "Eli's Comin'"
2. "Stoned Soul Picnic"
3. "Wedding Bell Blues"
4. "Poverty Train"

=== Jefferson Airplane ===
Introduced by Jerry Garcia.

1. "White Rabbit"
2. "Don't Slip Away"
3. "What you're askin' "
4. "Somebody to Love"
5. "Would you love me"
6. "High Flying Bird"
7. "It's no secret"
8. "You're so loose"
9. "My Best Friend"
10. "Plastic Fantastic Lover"
11. "This is my life"
12. "Other Side of This Life"
13. "Today"
14. "Running Around this World"

Lineup: Paul Kantner (vocals, guitars), Marty Balin (vocals), Jack Casady (bass), Jorma Kaukonen (guitars, vocals), Spencer Dryden (percussion), Grace Slick (vocals)

=== Booker T. & the M.G.s ===
1. "Booker Loo"
2. "Hip Hug-Her"
3. "Philly Dog"
4. "Green Onions"

Note: Set list is incomplete.

=== Otis Redding ===
Introduced by Tommy Smothers.

1. "Shake"
2. "Respect"
3. "I've Been Loving You Too Long"
4. "Satisfaction"
5. "Try a Little Tenderness"

== Sunday, June 18 (afternoon) ==
=== Ravi Shankar ===
1. "Rãga Todi-Rupak Tal" (7 beats)
2. "Tabla Solo In Ektal" (12 beats)
3. "Rãga Shuddha Sarang-Tintal" (16 beats)
4. "Rãga Bhimpalasi"
5. "Dhun In dadra" and fast teental (six and 16 beats)

== Sunday, June 18 (evening) ==
=== The Blues Project ===
Introduced by Paul Simon.

1. "Flute Thing"
2. "Wake Me, Shake Me"

wake me shake me performed by Al Kooper, he had just quit Blues project

line up: Harvey Brooks (of electric flag) on bass Sam Lay (of paul butterfield blues band) on drums Elvin Bishop (of paul butterfiel blues band) on lead guitar

Blues project displaying the classical line up minus Kooper

Note: Set list is incomplete.

=== Big Brother and the Holding Company ===
Introduced by Tommy Smothers.

1. "Combination of the Two"
2. "Harry"
3. "Ball and Chain"

Note: This is Big Brother and the Holding Company's second set, hastily scheduled following the band's great reception on Saturday afternoon so that the performance could be included in the Monterey Pop concert film.

=== Group with No Name ===
Set list unknown.

Note: Band was led by Cyrus Faryar

=== Buffalo Springfield ===
Introduced by Peter Tork.

1. "For What It's Worth"
2. "Nowadays Clancy Can't Even Sing"
3. "Rock and Roll Woman"
4. "Bluebird"
5. "A Child's Claim to Fame"
6. "Pretty Girl Why"

Note: Neil Young had quit the band and was not present. His replacement Doug Hastings was the third guitarist at this show. David Crosby also sat in as a guest.

=== The Who ===
Introduced by Eric Burdon.

1. "Substitute"
2. "Summertime Blues"
3. "Pictures of Lily"
4. "A Quick One, While He's Away"
5. "Happy Jack"
6. "My Generation"

Note: The performance of "Happy Jack" is the only one of the six that was not filmed.

=== The Grateful Dead ===
1. "Viola Lee Blues"
2. "Cold Rain and Snow"
3. "Alligator/Caution (Do Not Stop on Tracks)"

=== The Jimi Hendrix Experience ===
Introduced by Brian Jones.

1. "Killing Floor"
2. "Foxy Lady"
3. "Like a Rolling Stone"
4. "Rock Me Baby"
5. "Hey Joe"
6. "Can You See Me" (Possibly not filmed, as no footage has ever emerged)
7. "The Wind Cries Mary"
8. "Purple Haze" (Only partly filmed because cameramen were changing reels)
9. "Wild Thing"

=== The Mamas & the Papas ===
Introduced by Paul Simon.

1. "Straight Shooter"
2. "Spanish Harlem"
3. "Somebody Groovy"
4. "Got a Feelin'"
5. "California Dreamin'"
6. "I Call Your Name"
7. "Monday, Monday"

=== Scott McKenzie ===
1. "San Francisco (Be Sure to Wear Flowers in Your Hair)"

Note: McKenzie was backed by the Mamas & the Papas's band.

=== The Mamas & the Papas with Scott McKenzie ===
1. "Dancing in the Street"

Note: McKenzie sat in front of the drums and played maracas.
