= Unreleased Quicksilver Messenger Service – Lost Gold and Silver =

Unreleased Quicksilver Messenger Service — Lost Gold and Silver

Compilation album by Quicksilver Messenger Service
- Released: 1999
- Genre: Psychedelic rock, acid rock
- Label: Capitol

Professional ratings
Review scores
Source	Rating
AllMusic	2.5/5 stars

Unreleased Quicksilver Messenger Service — Lost Gold and Silver is a compilation album by American psychedelic rock band Quicksilver Messenger Service. The album is made up of the European 2-LP release Maiden of the Cancer Moon from 1983, two tracks from the 1967 soundtrack album Revolution, both sides from a non-LP single released in late 1968 and some studio outtakes from the late 1960s.

== Track listing ==
=== Disc one ===
"Live from 1968"

1. "Back Door Man" – 4:15
2. "Codine" – 6:14
3. "Gold & Silver" – 12:02
4. "Smokestack Lightning" – 10:15
5. "Light Your Windows" – 3:06
6. "Dino's Song" – 3:32
7. "The Fool" – 13:15
8. "Who Do You Love?" – 12:21
9. "Mona/Maiden of the Cancer Moon/Mona" – 11:34

=== Bonus disc ===
"Studio"

1. "I Don't Want to Spoil Your Party (Dino's Song)" – 3:06
2. "Acapulco Gold and Silver (Gold and Silver)" – 2:37
3. "I Hear You Knockin'" – 3:12
4. "Back Door Man" – 4:00
5. "Your Time Will Come" – 3:10
6. "Who Do You Love (Part 1)" – 5:58
7. "Walkin' Blues" – 3:07
8. "Calvary" – 6:32
9. "Codine" – 5:22
10. "Babe I'm Gonna Leave You" – 5:06
11. "Stand by Me" – 3:35
12. "The Bears" – 2:11

== Personnel ==
- John Cipollina – vocals, guitar
- Gary Duncan – vocals, guitar
- David Freiberg – vocals, bass guitar, viola
- Greg Elmore – drums
