= At the Kabuki Theatre =

At The Kabuki Theatre

Live album by Quicksilver Messenger Service
- Released: 2007
- Recorded: December 31, 1970
- Genre: Psychedelic rock, acid rock
- Label: Charly

At The Kabuki Theatre is a live album by American psychedelic rock band Quicksilver Messenger Service. The last four tracks are taken from studio rehearsal tapes, probably made in 1970 and not in 1969 which is stated on the album cover.

Professional ratings
Review scores
Source	Rating
Allmusic	3.5/5 stars

== Track listing ==
=== CD 1 ===
1. "Fresh Air" (Jesse Oris Farrow) – 9:55
2. "New Year's Jam" (Unknown) – 2:45
3. "Baby, Baby" (Farrow) – 4:27
4. "Too Far" (David Freiberg) – 3:39
5. "The Truth" (Dino Valenti) – 7:54
6. "You're Gonna Need Somebody on Your Band" (Unknown) – 4:07
7. "Doctor Feelgood" (Curtis Smith) – 5:53
8. "Cobra" (John Cipollina) – 4:34
9. "Song for Frisco" (Valenti) – 5:33
10. "Mona" (Ellas McDaniel) – 9:14
11. "Subway" (Gary Duncan, Farrow) – 4:55

=== CD 2 ===
1. "What About Me" (Farrow) – 6:27
2. "Call On Me" (Farrow) – 15:29
3. "Pride of Man" (Hamilton Camp) – 4:21
4. "Local Colour" (Cipollina) – 3:17
5. "Not Fade Away" (Charles Hardin, Norman Petty) – 5:32
6. "Mojo" (Valenti) – 9:27
7. "Freeway Flyer" (Farrow) – 7:07
8. "Subway" (Duncan, Farrow) – 1:44
9. "Castles In The Sand" – 8:31
10. "Look Over Yonder Wall / State Farm" – 3:50
11. "Senor Blues" – 6:16

== Personnel ==
- Dino Valenti – vocals, guitar, congas
- John Cipollina – vocals, guitar
- Gary Duncan – vocals, guitar
- David Freiberg – vocals, bass
- Greg Elmore – drums
