= Quicksilver Messenger Service (album) =

Studio album by Quicksilver Messenger Service
- Released: May 1968
- Recorded: December 1967
- Genres: Psychedelic rock, acid rock
- Length: 31:46
- Label: Capitol (US)
- Producers: Nick Gravenites, Harvey Brooks, Pete Welding

Quicksilver Messenger Service chronology
Quicksilver Messenger Service (1968)	Happy Trails (1969)

Quicksilver Messenger Service is the debut studio album of Quicksilver Messenger Service, released in May 1968. The group were among the last of the original major San Francisco bands to secure a recording contract, which meant that the album appeared many months after the debut efforts of Jefferson Airplane, Grateful Dead, Country Joe and the Fish, Moby Grape, and Big Brother and the Holding Company. Despite this, the album received acclaim and is considered a cornerstone release in the late '60s Haight discography.

== Songs and Recording ==
This was Quicksilver Messenger Service's first album, although they had already recorded two songs in 1967 ("Codine" and "Babe I'm Gonna Leave You") for the soundtrack of the 1968 movie Revolution. Original singer/guitarist Jim Murray quit the group in August 1967, prior to this album's recording in December, as they adjusted to a four-man format. Production was handled by Nick Gravenites and Harvey Brookes of The Electric Flag along with Pete Welding. Sessions originally began with Brooks in Los Angeles but were considered unsatisfactory, so a few months later they moved San Francisco with Gravenites and Welding to re-record most of the material. Parts of "Pride of Man" and "The Fool" from the Los Angeles sessions still appear on the final product.

The album varies between the group's extended jam sound and lighter pop-oriented songs. Unlike contemporaries such as the Grateful Dead, Quicksilver's jams were highly planned as can be heard by comparing the studio versions of songs with those from archival live performances. Gary Duncan and John Cipollina displayed an innovative dueling lead guitar style on extended jam tracks such as "Gold and Silver" and "The Fool", with Cipollina making use of the wah-wah.

"Pride of Man", "Dino's Song", and "Gold And Silver" (in a shortened 3 minute version) had appeared regularly in the group's live setlists as far back as 1966. Hamilton Camp's folk protest number "Pride of Man" features horns courtesy of The Electric Flag. "Dino's Song" was written by Dino Valenti who was at that time in prison due to marijuana-related offenses; he would eventually rejoin the group at the start of 1970 and radically alter its sound. "Gold And Silver" had begun as a three-minute instrumental variation of Brubeck's "Take Five", gradually lengthened over live performances into a showcase for the group's improvisational technique (live versions usually featured an additional lengthy drum solo from Elmore). Elsewhere, "It's Been Too Long" had been penned by the group's manager Ron Polte while "Light Your Windows" was a Duncan-Freiberg original. Another original, the multi-sectional, quasi-symphonic closing psych epic "The Fool" had begun with lyrics typed on a typewriter by Freiberg during an LSD trip. It was first premiered for shows in May 1967 and gradually extended and polished into what appears on the album; the studio take features expressive viola work from Freiberg as well as uncredited backing vocals by the all-female Haight band The Ace of Cups.

Many cover songs which had been regulars of the group's live show in 1966 and 1967, including "Long Distance Call", "Smokestack Lightning", "All Night Worker", "Susie Q", "Got My Mojo Workin'", "Walkin' Blues" and "I Hear You Knocking" were passed over for recording while other popular early staples like their interpretations of "Mona" and "Who Do You Love?" would be saved for the next release Happy Trails.

== Release and Reception ==
Professional ratings
Review scores
Source	Rating
AllMusic	4.5/5 stars

The album came out in May 1968, housed in a sleeve whose front cover was designed by famed San Francisco poster artist Rick Griffin, with back cover photographs by Jim Marshall. It charted at No. 63 on Billboard that summer as the group continued to play shows across the country, with a specific preference for the Bay Area. Writing at the time of release, Barry Gifford at Rolling Stone thought the group's sound now resembled that of the Electric Flag a little too closely, but concluded that "the formula works" and was "a much finer record debut than The Grateful Dead's." In the UK, Disc & Music Echo ecstatically opined "beautiful music, carrying you several miles up from your room into the ionosphere and then smashing you back to earth again with things which just shouldn't be...possible on record." Retrospectively, Richie Unterburger at AllMusic called it "inarguably their strongest set of studio material, with the accent on melodic folk-rock."

== Track listing ==
Side one

1. "Pride of Man" – 4:08 (Hamilton Camp)
2. "Light Your Windows" – 2:38 (Gary Duncan, David Freiberg)
3. "Dino's Song" – 3:08 (Dino Valenti)
4. "Gold and Silver" – 6:43 (Gary Duncan, Steve Schuster)

Side two

1. "It's Been Too Long" – 3:01 (Ron Polte)
2. "The Fool" – 12:07 (Gary Duncan, David Freiberg)

== Personnel ==
Quicksilver Messenger Service

- John Cipollina - lead guitar, backing vocals
- Gary Duncan - guitar, backing and lead ("Dino's Song") vocals
- David Freiberg - bass guitar, lead vocals, viola
- Greg Elmore - drums

Additional Personnel

- The Ace of Cups - backing vocals on "The Fool"

== Charts ==
Album

Billboard (United States)

Year	Chart	Position
1968	Pop Albums	63
