= Maiden of the Cancer Moon =

Maiden Of The Cancer Moon

Live album by Quicksilver Messenger Service
- Released: 1983
- Genre: Psychedelic rock, acid rock
- Label: Psycho (UK label)

Maiden of the Cancer Moon is a live album by American psychedelic rock band Quicksilver Messenger Service.

Professional ratings
Review scores
Source	Rating
AllMusic	3/5 stars

== Track listing ==
=== Side One ===
1. "Back Door Man"
2. "Codine"
3. "Mona/Maiden of the Cancer Moon/Mona"

=== Side Two ===
1. "Gold and Silver"
2. "Smokestack Lightning"

=== Side Three ===
1. "Light Your Windows"
2. "Dino's Song"
3. "The Fool"

=== Side Four ===
1. "Who Do You Love?"
2. "Mona/Maiden of the Cancer Moon/Mona"

== Personnel ==
- John Cipollina – vocals, guitar
- Gary Duncan – vocals, guitar
- David Freiberg – vocals, bass guitar, viola
- Greg Elmore – drums
