= Mario Cipollina =

American bass guitarist (born 1954)

- Born: November 10, 1954 (age 72); San Rafael, California, United States
- Genre: Rock
- Occupation: Instrumentalist
- Instrument: Bass guitar
- Years active: 1970s–present
- Formerly of: Copperhead, Huey Lewis and the News
- Website: mariocipollina.com

Mario Cipollina is an American musician. He is most notable as the founding bass guitarist of the American rock band Huey Lewis and the News.

== Biography ==
Mario Cipollina was born in San Rafael, California, in 1954. His older brother, John Cipollina, was the guitarist for Quicksilver Messenger Service. With John, he formed the group Copperhead, but before they recorded their debut album, their parents made Mario quit due to his youth. Mario Cipollina later joined the band Soundhole, based in the San Francisco Bay Area. Soundhole had garnered a reputation and served as the backing band for Van Morrison in 1974, and they had a group rivalry with Clover, featuring Huey Lewis. In 1977, they changed their name to Airplay. Soundhole only ever released one single, "Everyday/Back To The Summer Of Love" (1975).

In 1979, Cipollina, Bill Gibson, and Johnny Colla of Soundhole plus Lewis and Sean Hopper of Clover joined forces to form Huey Lewis and the News, with whom Cipollina played bass for 16 years. With Lewis and the News, Cipollina wrote "Now Here's You" (co-write with rest of group) on Huey Lewis and the News (1980), and "You Crack Me Up" (with Lewis) on Sports (1983).

In 1975, Cipollina appeared on the Quicksilver Messenger Service "reunion" album Solid Silver, performing bass on some tracks in lieu of original bassist David Freiberg. Freiberg only appeared on select tracks as he had become busy with Jefferson Starship.

Tony Williams's 1978 album The Joy of Flying features Cipollina on bass, on the track "Open Fire".

Cipollina performed backing vocals on the 1985 charity pop single "We Are the World" by USA For Africa, along with the rest of the News. In the same year, Cipollina with the News appeared on Nick Lowe's track "I Knew the Bride (When She Used to Rock 'N' Roll)".

Cipollina was fired from Huey Lewis and the News in 1995 due to drug addiction. Following his ousting from the news, he performed on Jonathan Cain's 1995 album Back to the Innocence, on the track "Something Sacred". From 2002 to 2004, Mario was a member of Quicksilver Gold, a tribute band to Quicksilver Messenger Service. In 2007, Cipollina joined the News on stage for a state fair in California.

== Discography ==
=== with Huey Lewis and The News ===
- Huey Lewis and the News (1980)
- Picture This (1982)
- Sports (1983)
- Fore! (1986)
- Small World (1988)
- Hard at Play (1991)
- Four Chords & Several Years Ago (1994)

=== with others ===
- Solid Silver (1975) – Quicksilver Messenger Service
- The Joy of Flying (1978) – Tony Williams
- The Rose of England (1985) – Nick Lowe
- "We Are the World" (1985) – USA For Africa
- Back to the Innocence (1995) – Jonathan Cain
