= Ron Polte =

American music manager

- Born: Ronald Thomas Polte; April 24, 1932; Chicago, Illinois
- Died: September 14, 2016 (aged 84); Mill Valley, California
- Occupations: Talent manager; songwriter; musician
- Known for: Manager of Quicksilver Messenger Service, The Ace of Cups
- Spouse: Sally Robert (1996-2016)

Ronald Thomas Polte (April 24, 1932 – September 14, 2016) was an American manager in the California Bay Area rock and roll scene. He was well known as the manager of the psychedelic music groups, The Ace of Cups quintet, one of the earliest all-female groups, the renowned Quicksilver Messenger Service, which featured a host of major talents, and briefly, the Sons of Champlin.

== Early life ==
Polte was born on the impoverished South Side of Chicago, one of nine children. He had a rough childhood, but after his teen years, during which he had experienced difficulties with the law, he turned his life around.

== Career ==
With his friend from his teens, producer, and guitarist Nick Gravenites, Polte, a keyboardist and successful songwriter, migrated to the San Francisco Bay Area, where the Beat Generation had long flourished but was evolving into the hippie culture. After band manager Ambrose Hollingworth became a paraplegic as a result of injuries sustained in a 1967 car crash near Muir Beach, California, the management of both folk-rock bands Ace of Cups and the headliner Quicksilver Messenger Service was assumed by Polte. At West Pole, with his brother Frank, Polte also for a short time managed the Sons of Champlin. Polte was noted for recognizing talent. After hearing Jim McPherson playing guitar, he said, "He charmed me in 15 minutes,” Polte remembered, "He was accomplished, like a terrific magician. I was completely taken with him. Through the encounter, Polte helped him land a spot with John Cipollina's new band, Copperhead.

During Polte's time as manager, Quicksilver's lineup included guitarists Cippolina, Gary Duncan, David Freiberg (also bass) and Dino Valenti. All but Cipollina also sang. Nicky Hopkins and Mark Naftalin played keyboards and Greg Elmore played drums. Polte also founded the booking agency West Pole, which handled Bay Area groups such as Big Brother, with whom Janis Joplin sang, and the Sons of Champlin. Polte was almost unique in his expeditious attention to the needs of his artists, rapidly securing housing, transportation and rehearsal space, all with an eye to making their lives easier. Under Polte's management, Quicksilver, with its members' approval, was the only band to ever include stellar studio musician Hopkins in recording contract residuals. Quicksilver's Freiberg said, on being informed of Polte's passing when contacted for comment while he was on tour with the Jefferson Starship,"He was a good man." "I could always trust him to do what he thought was right." Gravenites said of him, "All the altruistic thinking that came out of that era he agreed with a thousand percent," Gravenites said. "He remained a firm defender of all the idealism from those years."

Polte was noted for his business acumen which in 1967 enabled him to land, with Capitol Records, one of the first major recording contracts for any San Francisco headliner band. He, as had Hollingworth before him, rejected proffered contracts for the Ace of Cups, as they felt offers received would not adequately compensate the band nor respect their talent.

He has writing credit for three tracks on the 1968 debut album by The Electric Flag, A Long Time Comin', one of them their 1967 single Groovin' Is Easy. He also wrote "It's Been Too Long" for Quicksilver's debut album.

== Wild West Fest ==
One of Polte's more impressive efforts was his brainchild to conceive and promote the massive, mostly free, Wild West Festival in Golden Gate Park. He helped create the broadly based San Francisco Music Council as a vehicle to oversee the promotion, to make attendance as affordable as possible to a broad spectrum of the Bay Area community, and to donate any surpluses to funding future artistic enterprises in the City. Funding for the concerts and events was raised from business, including Wells Fargo Bank, (which arranged to make available three stagecoaches to ferry disabled children from venue to venue) and the music community contributions, with two benefit concerts organized by normally competing entrepreneurs Bill Graham and Chet Helms held to pay for the logistics, one headlined by Joan Baez, the other by Jefferson Airplane, as well as a commitment from Greyhound Lines, and other bus companies to provide free transport to and from the sprawling Golden Gate Park sites. PG&E volunteered to wire up the various venues within the park for lights and sound. Billboard company Foster & Kleiser was to donate display of ads by poster artists such as Wes Wilson and Victor Moscoso. Medical and lost-kid centers were being erected. A special rate for the rental of Kezar Stadium allowed concert seating to cost just $3 per ticket, per day, compared to $18 advance sale for three days at Woodstock, and $24 at the gate. Woodstock was 50 miles from Albany, over 100 miles to New York City, and even further from New Haven and Hartford, Connecticut.

Rather than being aimed exclusively at "love children," it would feature appearances for all ages, ethnicities, and tastes. National festival director Barry Oliver was to provide classical music including Italy's Amici Della Musica, and an hours-long performance scheduled by Ali Akbar Khan. There would be poetry readings and Shakespeare plays. Invited and anticipated groups included Quicksilver, Sons of Champlin and the Ace of Cups, but also Aum, Big Brother and the Holding Company, The Charlatans, Cleveland Wrecking Company, Country Joe and the Fish, Creedence Clearwater Revival, It's a Beautiful Day, Janis Joplin, Linn Country, Mad River, Mother Earth, Santana, Sir Douglas Quintet, Sly and the Family Stone, and West. Some, like the Airplane, Creedence, and the Dead, were touring elsewhere but planned to fly into S.F. between shows to appear at Wild West.

200,000 attendees were expected with AM/FM radio personality Tom Donahue predicting, "Wild West can make a statement: That San Francisco is a beginning for so many groovy things and attitudes." "We want the biggest tidal wave we can have," "the super experience of all time." Thanks to pressures brought by residents of the Richmond and Sunset Districts which bordered the park, fearing of the influx of concertgoers, but also because of a surfeit of political correctness, coming from some of those ostensibly more concerned about the supposed exploitation of participants, the production was canceled, in its final stages of preparation. On August 12, 1969, Polte resigned from the San Francisco Music Council, ten days before the first day of the planned but canceled three-day festival.

== Personal ==
Polte lived in the San Francisco Bay Area for most of the last six decades of his life, and for the final decades, in Mill Valley, California. He was survived by his wife of 20 years, Sally Robert, his daughters Pamela Polte of Sutter Creek, California in Amador County, and Patti Ann Lindecker of Chicago; two sons, Thomas Polte of Chicago and Jeremy Polte of Dunsmuir, California in Siskiyou County, and his two sisters, Marilyn McMinn and Nancy Brunanchon of Pine Grove, California in Amador County.
