= Fresh Air (song) =

- German single picture sleeve

Song by Quicksilver Messenger Service

from the album Just for Love
- B-side: "Freeway Flyer"
- Released: August 1970
- Recorded: May–June 1970
- Genre: Psychedelic rock, acid rock
- Length: 5:22
- Songwriter: Jesse Oris Farrow (Dino Valenti)

"Fresh Air" is a 1970 song written by Gary Duncan with lyrics by Jesse Oris Farrow, the pen name of Chester William "Chet" Powers, Jr., who also used the stage name of Dino Valenti/Valente (it is only credited to Powers/Valenti, however). It was first recorded by the San Francisco-based band Quicksilver Messenger Service, which Valenti had recently rejoined at the start of 1970. "Fresh Air" was the only single released from the album Just for Love. The single peaked at No. 49 on November 7, 1970 during a nine-week stay on the Billboard Hot 100, making it the band's most successful single. In Canada it reached No. 73.

The song was recorded as part of the sessions for the Just for Love album between May and June, 1970. Both this and the follow-up album What About Me were recorded during the band's relocation to Hawaii. Matthew Gruenwald of Allmusic opined that the song featured some of John Cipollina's best guitar work. In concert, the song was often used to open the set where it was usually extended to ten minutes in length in order to feature the group's trademark Duncan/Cipollina guitar dueling, as heard on archival releases like At the Kabuki Theatre.
