= Shady Grove (Quicksilver Messenger Service album) =

Studio album by Quicksilver Messenger Service
- Released: December 1969
- Recorded: July−September 1969
- Studios: Wally Heider Studios (San Francisco); Pacific High (San Francisco)
- Genres: Psychedelic rock, acid rock
- Length: 43:26
- Label: Capitol
- Producer: John Palladino

Quicksilver Messenger Service chronology
Happy Trails (1969)	Shady Grove (1969)	Just for Love (1970)

Shady Grove is a 1969 studio album by Quicksilver Messenger Service.

== Recording ==
At the start of 1969, guitarist and vocalist Gary Duncan temporarily left the band, upon which they ceased touring. The remaining members played a small handful of gigs in the spring and summer of the year with guest vocalist Nick Gravenites before hiring ace session keyboardist Nicky Hopkins to permanently join them that August, although only three gigs were played with this lineup until regular touring began again on New Year's Eve with the return of Duncan and the addition of Dino Valenti. Nonetheless, the band began recording their third album with Hopkins that summer.

The influence of Nicky Hopkins, the English journeyman pianist who appears on albums by Jeff Beck, The Rolling Stones, The Who, all four of the ex-Beatles and Steve Miller is felt throughout Shady Grove, and his contributions pushed the group in new directions. However, David Freiberg's vocal presence and John Cipollina's idiosyncratic guitar stylings make the Quicksilver sound of the first two albums still apparent.

Hopkins re-recorded the closing track, "Edward, The Mad Shirt Grinder", on his solo album The Tin Man Was a Dreamer, which features members of the Rolling Stones and the Beatles. (“Edward” was a nickname for Nicky Hopkins, made up by Brian Jones during a 1967 session at Olympic Studios in London. The story goes that Jones was tuning his guitar and asked Hopkins to give him an E on the piano; with other noise interfering and Nicky unable to hear what he was saying, Brian eventually shouted out: "Give me an E, like in Edward!") The track's elaborate, classically inspired keyboard work and extended jamming veers closer to an English progressive rock sound. "Flute Song", with its melancholic piano and string backing (ironically, no flute appears), is also prog-influenced. "Joseph's Coat", co-written by John Cipollina and Nick Gravenites, also appears on Big Brother and the Holding Company's album Be a Brother, which featured Gravenites on vocals.

The cover was designed by George Hunter's Global Propaganda and featured a slightly edited version of a work by painter L.K. Hollister, of otherwise unknown personal information.

The album became the group's highest-charting when it hit #25 on Billboard that winter.

== Critical reception ==
Professional ratings
Review scores
Source	Rating
AllMusic	2.5/5 stars
Rolling Stone	(mixed)
The Village Voice	C+
MusicHound Rock	2/5
Select	3/5 medals

In his review of the album, for AllMusic, Lindsay Planer writes: "This somewhat uneven effort would sadly foreshadow QMS's journey from psychedelia and into a much more pop-oriented sound on their follow-up, Just for Love (1970). However, enthusiasts of those albums will find much more to revisit on Shady Grove than those who favored the first two records."

== Track listing ==
Side one
No.	Title	Writer(s)	Length
1.	"Shady Grove"	P.O. Wands	2:59
2.	"Flute Song"	Denise (Kaufman) Jewkes	5:17
3.	"Three or Four Feet from Home"	John Cipollina	2:58
4.	"Too Far"	David Freiberg	4:23
5.	"Holy Moly"	Nick Gravenites	4:20

Side two
No.	Title	Writer(s)	Length
6.	"Joseph's Coat"	Cipollina, Gravenites	4:36
7.	"Flashing Lonesome"	Freiberg, Gravenites	5:21
8.	"Words Can't Say"	Freiberg, Jewkes	3:17
9.	"Edward, the Mad Shirt Grinder"	Nicky Hopkins	9:10
Total length:			43:26

== Personnel ==
Quicksilver Messenger Service

- John Cipollina – guitar, backing and lead ("Three or Four Feet from Home") vocals
- David Freiberg – bass, lead vocals (tracks 1, 2, 4–8), guitar, viola
- Greg Elmore – drums, percussion
- Nicky Hopkins – piano, organ, celeste, harpsichord, cello

== Production ==
- Engineer – Dan Healy, Robert Shumaker, David Brown, Michael Leary
- Mixing – Dan Healy, Quicksilver Messenger Service, Snarly Grumble
- Executive producer – John Palladino
- Mixed at Pacific High Recorders

== Charts ==
Album

Billboard (United States)

Year	Chart	Position
1970	Pop Albums	25

RPM (Canada)

Year	Chart	Position
1970	Pop Albums	33
