= Just for Love =

Studio album by Quicksilver Messenger Service
- Released: August 1970
- Genres: Psychedelic rock, acid rock
- Length: 39:50
- Label: Capitol
- Producer: John Palladino

Quicksilver Messenger Service chronology
Shady Grove (1969)	Just for Love (1970)	What About Me (1970)

Just for Love is the fourth album by American psychedelic rock band Quicksilver Messenger Service. Released in August 1970, it marks a stark departure from the extended, blues and jazz-inspired acid rock jamming of their first two albums, to a more traditional pop-rock sound. Dino Valenti, who allegedly discussed forming the group with John Cipollina in 1965 but was apprehended by police on drug charges, finally joined after a stint in prison. Valenti's influence is prevalent throughout the album; he sang every lead and composed eight of its nine tracks under the pseudonym Jesse Oris Farrow. Despite the marked change in the band's sound, it was their third straight album to reach the Top 30 on the Billboard charts, peaking at number 27. The only track from the album released as a single, "Fresh Air", became the band's biggest hit, reaching number 49.

Professional ratings
Review scores
Source	Rating
Allmusic	3/5 stars
Christgau's Record Guide	B−

== Track listing ==
All songs written by Jesse Oris Farrow (Dino Valenti), except where noted.

Side one

1. "Wolf Run (Part 1)" – 1:12
2. "Just for Love (Part 1)" – 3:00
3. "Cobra" (John Cipollina) – 4:23
4. "The Hat" – 10:36

Side two

5. "Freeway Flyer" – 3:49
6. "Gone Again" – 7:17
7. "Fresh Air" – 5:21
8. "Just for Love (Part 2)" – 1:38
9. "Wolf Run (Part 2)" – 2:10

== Personnel ==
- Dino Valenti – lead vocals, rhythm guitar, flute, conga
- Gary Duncan – guitar, backing vocals, bass, maracas, wood block
- John Cipollina – steel, slide and electric guitars, backing vocals
- David Freiberg – bass, backing vocals, guitar
- Greg Elmore – drums, percussion
- Nicky Hopkins – piano

== Charts ==
Album

Year	Chart	Position
1970	Billboard Pop Albums	27

Single

Year	Single	Chart	Position
1970	"Fresh Air"	Billboard Pop Singles	49
