= Pete Welding =

American record producer (1935–1995)

- Born: Peter John Welding; November 15, 1935; Philadelphia, U.S.
- Died: November 17, 1995 (aged 60); Rancho Cucamonga, California, U.S.
- Occupations: Historian, archivist and record producer

Peter John Welding (November 15, 1935 – November 17, 1995) was an American historian, archivist, and record producer specializing in jazz and blues.

Born in Philadelphia, United States, Welding worked as a journalist for DownBeat magazine and occasionally freelanced for other publications including Rolling Stone. In 1962, he moved to Chicago and, inspired by Bob Koester at Delmark Records, founded Testament Records in 1963 to issue recordings of blues and black folk song.

As a producer with credits encompassing Blind Connie Williams, Big Joe Williams, Robert Nighthawk, Peg Leg Howell, Doctor Ross, Mississippi Fred McDowell, J. B. Hutto, Bo Diddley, Otis Spann, Jean-Luc Ponty, Charlie Musselwhite, The Jazz Crusaders and Johnny Shines, Welding was known for discovering talent in unusual places. In 1961, while doing research for a prospective album on Philadelphia street singers, he was approached by Herb Gart, who found blues singer Doug Quattlebaum "driving a "Mister Softee" ice cream truck — with his guitar plugged into the truck's amplification system, entertaining the kids with his blues!", resulting in an album financed by Moe of Manny, Moe and Jack (Pep Boys) eventually titled Softee Man Blues. Notably, he co-produced Quicksilver Messenger Service's debut album with Nick Gravenites and Harvey Brooks in 1968.

In 1993, Welding was nominated for a Grammy Award with Lawrence Cohn for the liner notes to Roots 'n' Blues the Retrospective (1925–1950) (various artists). Cohn and Welding also produced Leadbelly (Live in Concert), nominated for a Grammy in 1973.

Photographer Raeburn Flerlage, who worked closely with Welding on DownBeat, remembered Welding as unassuming but assertive, with a formidable vocabulary and an "outlandish" sense of humor.

Welding also contributed sleeve notes to a wide variety of albums, including much of Frank Sinatra's output for Capitol Records. Welding died, at the age of 60, following a heart attack at his home in Rancho Cucamonga, California, on November 17, 1995. He was posthumously inducted to the Blues Hall of Fame in 1996.
