= Jack O'Connell (filmmaker) =

American filmmaker (1923–2019)

- O'Connell in 1962
- Born: May 2, 1923; Boston, Massachusetts, United States
- Died: July 20, 2019 (aged 96)
- Education: Princeton University, Harvard Business School
- Occupation: Filmmaker
- Military Service
- Allegiance: United States
- Branch: US Army
- Conflicts: World War II

Jack O'Connell (May 2, 1923 – July 20, 2019) was an American filmmaker, actor & songwriter particularly noted for producing Greenwich Village Story (1963), Revolution (1968) and Swedish Fly Girls (1971).

== Background ==
O'Connell was born in Boston, Massachusetts on May 2, 1923. During World War II he spent 3 years as a part of the US Army, including 19 months of which were spent in Europe working in signal intelligence behind the German lines. Following the war, he graduated with an BA from Princeton University in 1947, and an MBA from Harvard Business School (Advertising and Marketing major) in 1949. Subsequently, O'Connell spent ten years working in advertising on Madison Avenue, creating print advertising, poster advertising, and film commercials for national and regional clients.

== Filmmaker ==
O'Connell first involvement in film came with working on the Italian films L'Avventura and La Dolce Vita, both in 1960.

O'Connell was noted for making films about the post-beat and hippie movements in San Francisco in the 1960s. O'Connell co-wrote some of the music for his films, such as Revolution played by Mother Earth in the film of the same name. This film also featured Country Joe and the Fish, Quicksilver Messenger Service and Steve Miller Band. In 1996, O'Connell released a revised version of Revolution labelled Hippie Revolution, including interviews conducted in 1986 with people from the original version of the film, now speaking in hindsight about their experiences.

=== Filmography ===
Year	Title
1963	Greenwich Village Story
1968	Revolution
1971	Swedish Fly Girls
1996	Hippie Revolution
