= Copperhead (1970s band) =

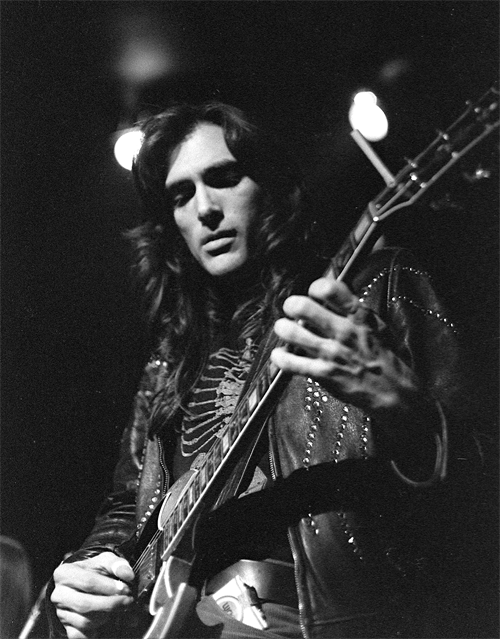
- John Cipollina of Copperhead.

Background information
- Origin: San Francisco, United States
- Genre: Rock
- Years active: 1970–1974
- Label: Columbia Records

Copperhead was an American rock and roll group founded by guitarist John Cipollina, after leaving the band Quicksilver Messenger Service in 1970.

Copperhead originally consisted of Cipollina (lead guitar), Gary Phillips (vocals, rhythm guitar, organ), Jim McPherson (vocals, piano, bass), Pete Sears (bass, piano), and David Weber (drums). In 1972, Sears left to fly back to England and collaborate with Rod Stewart and Nicky Hopkins; he was replaced by Mario Cipollina, younger brother of John. Copperhead was originally signed to the Just Sunshine record label, but after Sears' departure they were signed to a major-label deal by Clive Davis at Columbia Records. Before their first album, Mario Cipollina left the band due to his parents' concerns about his young age (he was 17/18), and bassist Hutch Hutchinson replaced him. They recorded their debut album for Columbia, entitled Copperhead (1973). The first album was a commercial failure due to lack of support and promotion, and Columbia refused to release their second album, leading to Copperhead disbanding.

Phillips died of cancer in 2007 at age 59.
