= Happy Trails (album) =

Live album by Quicksilver Messenger Service
- Released: March 1969
- Recorded: November 1968
- Venues: Fillmore West, San Francisco; Fillmore East, New York City
- Studios: Golden State Recorders, San Francisco
- Genres: Psychedelic rock, acid rock
- Length: 50:09
- Label: Capitol

Quicksilver Messenger Service chronology
Quicksilver Messenger Service (1968)	Happy Trails (1969)	Shady Grove (1969)

Happy Trails is the second album of the American band Quicksilver Messenger Service. Most of the album was recorded from two performances at the Fillmore East and Fillmore West, although it is not clear which parts were recorded at which Fillmore. The record was released by Capitol Records in 1969 in stereo.

== Album content ==
The first side of the album consists entirely of a live performance of Bo Diddley's song, "Who Do You Love?". In a self-deprecating poke at the rendition's extended length, it is listed as the "Who Do You Love Suite", with individually titled "movements" which give writing credits to the soloist on each segment. The performance of Bo Diddley's composition breaks down into a guitar solo by Gary Duncan in a style somewhere between jazz and rock (described as "Bloomfield-like") with a walking bass line by Freiberg. It then mellows down into some apparently improvised guitar and bass plucking and sliding, with feedback, handclapping and audience participation 'almost like a "found object" out of Dada.' Solos by Cipollina and then Freiberg follow. Then comes a slower, quieter reprise of one verse of the Bo Diddley song, leading to a pianissimo ensemble vocal, followed by a finale in which Elmore changes to a back-beat, while Duncan and Freiberg still play the Bo Diddley beat. Duncan's vocals and Cipollina's lead guitar use call-and-response, and the result is a polyrhythmic rock sound.

The recorded live performance of the "Who Do You Love Suite" was almost 27 minutes long, and some of Gary Duncan's solo ("When You Love") was excised, perhaps due to the space constraints of LPs. At the end, Bill Graham announces, "Quicksilver Messenger Service." According to Mick Skidmore, Cipollina found the critical laud for "Who Do You Love?" baffling, saying "it was just a two-chord jam." (April 2001, Notes to Acadia CD "Copperhead")

The second side of the album contains "Mona", another Bo Diddley song, and two instrumental compositions by Duncan, "Maiden of the Cancer Moon" and "Calvary", all of which segue. The three songs were originally parts of a single continuous live performance. Both Cipollina and Duncan take guitar solos on "Mona". The live recording of "Calvary" was abridged shortly after the end of "Maiden of the Cancer Moon" and a studio version was recorded and substituted. The ironic comment at the beginning of side two, "This here next one's rock 'n' roll," was also added in the studio.

The lead guitar on "Maiden of the Cancer Moon" is played by Cipollina. This is clearly a scored piece, as opposed to the improvisational guitar playing on "Mona."

"Calvary" was originally called the "F-Sharp Thing". It has been described as "acid-flamenco", but it is definitely not flamenco music. It does resemble orchestral or symphonic music, and it is not readily classifiable as rock, jazz or blues. In the studio, Quicksilver took the themes of Duncan's piece and redid them with an extended introduction, a different cadenza by Duncan, guitar and bass feedback, a brief interlude that rises out of the feedback, and a closing melody, played staccato, that fades out. There are a variety of percussion instruments used besides the standard drum kit: tympani, a tam-tam, a whip, tubular bells, bar chimes (or perhaps the newly invented mark tree), a triangle or a bell, and güiro. In addition, Duncan lays down his electric guitar to play an acoustic guitar during the brief interlude, and then takes up the electric once again. The band also sings wordless vocals in harmony. Duncan shouts, "Call it anything you want!", while the track begins and fades out with "shhh" vocals. The album sleeve says that "Calvary" was recorded "live" at Golden State Recorders, meaning that nothing was overdubbed. There was also substantial editing and additional overdubbing done at Golden State Recorders to both sides of the record.

As a coda, the band performs the theme tune from Roy Rogers' western television show, which lends its title to the album. "Happy Trails" has "clip-clop percussion, piano and drawling vocals by Elmore[.]" There is no bass on this track; Freiberg plays a honky-tonk piano part.

== Reception ==
Professional ratings
Review scores
Source	Rating
AllMusic	5/5 stars
Head Heritage	(very favourable)
Rolling Stone	(positive)
Encyclopedia of Popular Music	5/5 stars

While briefly remarking that all four songs on the second side are excellent, Greil Marcus devoted most of his review in Rolling Stone to extensive discussion of the side-long rendition of "Who Do You Love?", which he deemed "one of the best rock and roll recordings to emerge from San Francisco, a performance that captures all the excitement and grandeur of the great days of the scene in a way that is almost too fine to be real." He particularly noted that, "They use the infamous Bo Diddley rhythm not as a crutch, not as something for the rhythm section to play with while the lead takes it; Quicksilver finds dimensions of that 'bump buddy bump bump — bump bump' beat that no one has even suggested before, as they stretch it, bend it, move around it, as a motif or a bridge, as an idea rather than as a pattern."

Retrospective reviews have also been highly positive. Head Heritage's Julian Cope strongly approved of the decision to have most of the album devoted to Bo Diddley covers, saying Diddley's "amplified cigar box and ever-shifting shuffle beat lent itself easily to interpretations of extended electric guitar-based improvisations". He found all the tracks to be effective, especially praising the interplay of Duncan and Cipollina's guitars, and insisted that "The entire album was recorded live at The Fillmore East and West" despite the sleeve clearly indicating that much of the album was recorded in the studio. Lindsay Planer of AllMusic, while not questioning the partially studio setting for the recording, likewise found Happy Trails to be by far the most accurate recorded recreation of Quicksilver Messenger Service's "critically and enthusiastically acclaimed live performances." He lauded both the atmospheric and technical accomplishments of the jamming, and said the band has "the uncanny ability to perform with a psychedelic looseness of spirit, without becoming boring or in the least bit pretentious."

=== Awards and accolades ===
The album was a surprise commercial success, hitting #27 on Billboard and eventually certified gold (over 500,000 copies sold in the US) in 1992 by the Recording Industry Association of America. It was voted number 553 in Colin Larkin's All Time Top 1000 Albums 3rd Edition (2000). In 2003, the album was ranked number 189 on Rolling Stone magazine's 500 Greatest Albums of All Time, maintaining the rating in a 2012 revised list, but failing to make the list in its 2023 iteration. It was number 44 in Rolling Stone's "50 Coolest Records." "Mona" by Quicksilver was ranked number 88 on the 100 Greatest Guitar Songs of All Time by Rolling Stone.

== Track listing ==
Side one
No.	Title	Length
1.	"Who Do You Love Suite": I. "Who Do You Love (Part 1)" (Ellas McDaniel (Bo Diddley)); II. "When You Love" (Gary Duncan); III. "Where You Love" (Greg Elmore (Note: The album cover credits "Quicksilver & Fillmore Audience" as the writers of this segment, apparently in acknowledgement of the audience participation portion, but the label on the original album instead credits Greg Elmore. BMI records (see BMI Work #1658037) confirm that the official writing credit belongs to Elmore alone, though it is not clear why, since Elmore was not a songwriter and does not perform a solo of any sort during the segment.)); IV. "How You Love" (John Cipollina); V. "Which Do You Love" (David Freiberg); VI. "Who Do You Love (Part 2)" (McDaniel)"	25:22: 3:32; 5:15; 6:07; 2:28; 1:49; 5:51
Total length:		25:22

Side two
No.	Title	Writer(s)	Length
2.	"Mona"	McDaniel	6:53
3.	"Maiden of the Cancer Moon"	Duncan	2:54
4.	"Calvary"	Duncan	13:31
5.	"Happy Trails"	Dale Evans	1:29
Total length:			24:47

== Personnel ==
Quicksilver Messenger Service

- John Cipollina – guitar; backing vocals ("Mona")
- Gary Duncan – guitar; lead vocals ("Who Do You Love" pts. 1 & 2, "Mona", "Happy Trails")
- David Freiberg – bass; backing vocals ("Mona"), piano ("Happy Trails")
- Greg Elmore – drums; piano, wood block ("Happy Trails")

== Releases ==
Happy Trails was remastered and rereleased in audiophile versions of June 2012 (a “mini LP” on CD) and January 2013 (HQ vinyl). An English version came out in 2010. Japanese versions surfaced in 2008 and 2009. Capitol Records released a CD version in 1994.

== Charts ==
Album

Billboard (United States)

Year	Chart	Position
1969	Pop Albums	27

RPM (Canada)

Year	Chart	Position
1969	Pop Albums	34

Singles

Billboard (United States)

Year	Single	Chart	Position
1969	"Who Do You Love"	The Billboard Hot 100	91
