= Who Do You Love? (Bo Diddley song) =

1956 song by Bo Diddley

- Original 78 rpm single label

Single by Bo Diddley
- B-side: "I'm Bad"
- Released: 1956
- Recorded: Chicago, March 24, 1956
- Genre: Rock and roll; rhythm and blues
- Length: 2:18
- Label: Checker
- Songwriter: Ellas McDaniel a.k.a. Bo Diddley
- Producers: Leonard Chess; Phil Chess; Bo Diddley

Bo Diddley singles chronology
"Diddy Wah Diddy" (1956)	"Who Do You Love?" (1956)	"Cops and Robbers" (1956)

"Who Do You Love?" is a song written by American rock and roll pioneer Bo Diddley. Recorded in 1956, it is one of his most popular and enduring works. The song represents one of Bo Diddley's strongest lyrical efforts and uses a combination of hoodoo-type imagery and boasting. It is an upbeat rocker, but the original did not use the signature Bo Diddley beat rhythm.

"Who Do You Love?" was part of Bo Diddley's repertoire throughout his career, but none of his various recordings reached the record charts. The song has been interpreted and recorded by numerous musicians in different styles, often adding a Bo Diddley beat. Popular renditions include those by Ronnie Hawkins and George Thorogood, with charting singles by the Woolies, Tom Rush, Quicksilver Messenger Service, and Juicy Lucy.

Guitarists' contributions to the various renditions of the song have been noted by music critics and writers. Beginning with blues guitarist Jody Williams' prominent fills and solo on Bo Diddley's original recording, the guitar work by Robbie Robertson (Hawkins), John Cipollina (Quicksilver), Glenn Ross Campbell (Juicy Lucy), and Thorogood on later adaptations has been also acknowledged.

== Background and lyrics ==
Bo Diddley wrote "Who Do You Love" in 1956. The idea came to him in Kansas City where he heard a group of children trying to out-brag one another using a particular rhythm. "It was like an African chant, and I wanted words that would suit it", Bo Diddley recalled. Inspired by Muddy Waters' 1954 hit "I'm Your Hoochie Coochie Man", he wanted to outdo songwriter Willie Dixon's lyrical swagger:

I'm telling this chick ... how bad I am, so she can go tell the cat she's hanging with, "this dude is something else." That's what it kinda meant, cat ridin' rattlesnakes and kissin' boa constrictors and stuff.

He also sings about a skull, a tombstone, a graveyard, and a scream in the night to convey a sense of foreboding. The use of the homonym "who do" is an allusion to "hoodoo", a Louisiana/Mississippi folk magic belief that events can be influenced by its use. However, Bo Diddley uses imagery more common to the American Southwest, combined with exaggerated bravado. He explained that the first line, "I walk forty-seven miles of barbed wire", came to him quickly, "but I couldn't get a rhyme for it. I thought of car tires and mule trains, and I couldn't get anything to fit. Then one day I said 'use a cobra snake,' and my drummer, Clifton James, added 'for a necktie'". These are directed at a female he is trying to woo – "who do you love, me or him". The lyrics confirm the effect: "Arlene took me by my hand, she said 'oo-ee daddy I understand', who do you love?".

== Composition and recording ==
Musically, "Who Do You Love?" is an uptempo song centered on one chord with guitar flourishes that complement the vocals. It has a strong rhythm, but unlike later interpretations, it does not use the typical Bo Diddley beat. Instead, the song uses a "modified cut shuffle beat" or 2/4 time, giving it an almost rockabilly feel, similar to Chuck Berry's "Maybellene".

"Who Do You Love?" was recorded in Chicago on March 24, 1956, one year after recording his self-titled debut single. Bo Diddley uses his characteristic sound processing effects, including echoey vocal and tremolo-laden rhythm electric guitar. Jody Williams answers the vocal lines with prominent, distinctive overdriven guitar fills and a solo. Biographer George R. White calls his playing "revolutionary". In naming Williams to its list of "35 Blues Guitarists Who Definitely Started It All", Spin magazine adds, "His solo on Diddley's 'Who Do You Love?' is a lesson in evil". Clifton James plays the drums and percussionist Jerome Green adds maracas. (Note: Frank Kirkland is sometimes listed as the drummer for Bo Diddley's original session)

== Release and reception ==
In 1956, the song was released as a single by Checker Records, a Chess Records subsidiary, but did not reach the record charts. It reached a bigger audience when it was included on his first compilation album, Bo Diddley, released in 1958. "Who Do You Love?" appears on numerous later compilations, including His Best. Music critic Cub Koda calls "Who Do You Love?" one of Bo Diddley's strongest lyrical efforts. Writer Don Snowden notes that it is "an enduring lyric archetype on the order of 'Johnny B. Goode' and 'Hoochie Coochie Man'". White describes it as "a stunning display of voodooesque braggadocio". He adds that the song is "spine-chilling ... [with] murky vocals, eerie—almost surreal—lyrics".

In 1967, Bo Diddley recorded an updated version of the song with Muddy Waters and Little Walter for the Super Blues collaboration album. He recorded it again in 1987 for the La Bamba film soundtrack. Willie Dixon produced the song and Los Lobos provided the ensemble backing.

== Renditions ==
=== Ronnie Hawkins and the Hawks ===
Rockabilly singer Ronnie Hawkins performed "Who Do You Love?" during live engagements as early as the late 1950s. In early 1963, Hawkins recorded the song in New York City with producer Henry Glover. Roulette Records released it as a single with the title "Who Do You Love" backed with "Bo Diddley". Music historian Charlie Gillett describes Hawkins' vocal as "low and hard, achieving all that rock 'n' roll could do". Although the single only lists the artist as "Ronnie Hawkins", he was backed by his band the Hawks: Levon Helm on drums, Robbie Robertson on lead guitar, Rick Danko on rhythm guitar, former lead guitarist Roy Buchanan on bass, Richard Manuel on piano, and Jerry Penfound on tenor saxophone. Studio musician King Curtis augmented the lineup on tenor saxophone.

The Hawks' Robbie Robertson's guitar playing is prominent in the recording and has been noted by several music writers. Critic Richie Unterberger described it as "a good few years ahead of its time in its manic distorted intensity". Robertson's style has been compared to that of blues guitarist Willie Johnson, who was a key contributor to Howlin' Wolf's early 1950s sound. Longtime Howlin' Wolf guitarist Hubert Sumlin's 1961 solo on "Wang Dang Doodle" has been suggested as inspiring Robertson. However, Gillett writes, "Robertson's guitar style did not imitate any particular previous guitarist" and added "five years later, many guitarists were trying in vain for comparable effects".

Hawkins' single was a hit in Canada, according to writer Oliver Trager, but its release predated Canadian record chart compiler, RPM magazine. Except near the border in the Great Lakes area, the record was largely unnoticed and did not appear on the Billboard charts. In 1964, they performed an eight-minute version in a jam style later associated with the Grateful Dead. Robertson, along with Levon Helm and Garth Hudson, backed John P. Hammond for a recording of "Who Do You Love" for the latter's So Many Roads album. Released in 1965, the song uses a Bo Diddley beat with a blues rock arrangement. In 1976, Hawkins performed the song with his former Hawks, who had become The Band, for The Last Waltz concert film and album. Band biographer Neil Minturn describes it as "demanding an ebullient, loose, insistent, repetitive groove, with roots in Southern, rural culture. Hawkins continued to perform "Who Do You Love" as a solo artist.

=== Quicksilver Messenger Service ===
"Who Do You Love"
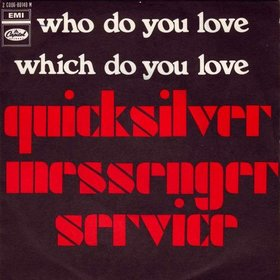
- French single picture sleeve

Song by Quicksilver Messenger Service

from the album Happy Trails
- Released: March 1969
- Recorded: 1968
- Venue: Fillmore East, New York City and/or; Fillmore West, San Francisco
- Genre: Hard rock
- Length: 25:22 (album); 3:35 (single edit)
- Label: Capitol
- Songwriter: E. McDaniels a.k.a. Bo Diddley

San Francisco psychedelic rock band Quicksilver Messenger Service made "Who Do You Love" a feature of their live performances. During the group's early days in 1966 and 1967 with singer and harmonica player Jim Murray, the song was performed with a relatively concise blues rock arrangement featuring a Bo Diddley-style beat and harmonica and guitar solos. They attempted at least one studio recording in 1967 during the sessions that led to their first album, Quicksilver Messenger Service. The demo was officially released on the 1999 album Unreleased Quicksilver Messenger Service – Lost Gold and Silver. At just less than six minutes, it is fairly representative of their early performances.

However, by mid-1968 "Who Do You Love" took on a different arrangement. Unterberger calls it a "template upon which to hang long instrumental guitar improvisations, [with] the tempo and the melody of the original tune all but disappearing". A 25-minute live adaptation was included on Quicksilver's second album, Happy Trails, that was edited from 1968 recordings at the Fillmore East and/or Fillmore West. The group performs it as a six-part suite that "weave[s] into and back out of the main theme", with sections allow for instrumental exploration by the individual band members.

The first and last sections, titled "Who Do You Love Parts 1 and 2", are the most Bo Diddley-anchored sections of the song with vocals and his well-known beat. The non-vocal sections have titles that play on the original, but beginning with different interrogatives: when, where, how, and which. The second section features a jazz-influenced guitar solo by Gary Duncan and interplay with guitarist John Cipollina, while the third deconstructs into guitar effects and ambient audience sounds. The fourth section returns to the Bo Diddley theme with a guitar solo by Cipollina, described in a Mojo magazine album review as "distinctive, quivering, vibrato-heavy playing", with the band delivering a solid backing. The fifth section highlights David Freiberg's bass lines and the sixth section is the coda with vocal and harmonies.

Rock music critic Greil Marcus calls "Who Do You Love" "one of the best rock'n'roll recordings to emerge from San Francisco [and] some of the finest hard rock ever recorded". In the description of the song, Legends of Rock Guitar: The Essential Reference of Rock's Greatest Guitarists includes: "[Cipollina] whips out nearly every technique and effect known to rock guitarists at the time, including heavy distortion, feedback, tremolo, echo, and slide effects, as well as his novel jazz influences, whammy vibrato, and string bending techniques." In a song review for AllMusic, Matthew Greenwald writes:

Quicksilver take the Bo Diddley classic and expand it almost beyond comprehension, encompassing blues, rock, psychedelic, and other elements, while still (remarkably) retaining its core groove. Several parts of the movements showcase the powerful Cipollina/Duncan guitar duels, which were indeed a trademark of the band.

At over twenty-five minutes, the song was too long for commercial radio airplay. Capitol Records prepared an edited 3:35 version for release as a single. It became Quicksilver's first appearance on Billboard's Hot 100 singles chart, where it reached number 91 in 1969. The Happy Trails record album, with the song taking up the entire first side, became a best seller at number 27 in the album chart, also in 1969. Rolling Stone included the album at number 189 on its list of the "500 Greatest Albums of all Time"

=== George Thorogood and the Destroyers ===
American blues rock singer and guitarist George Thorogood and the Destroyers recorded "Who Do You Love?" for their second album, Move It on Over (1978). The Destroyers played the song during soundchecks, and they ended up recording it when they ran out of material for the album.

In contrast to Quicksilver Messenger Service, Thorogood's punchy 4:21 rendition is more suited to a dive bar than a psychedelic ballroom. AllMusic writer Tim Sendra notes the song's "pounding" Bo Diddley-beat, with Thorogood's "nasty slide [guitar] playing and barstool blues vocals". In addition to Bo Diddley's lyrics, he included: "Snakeskin shoes baby put 'em on your feet, got the good time music with a Bo Diddley beat".

The song became an FM rock radio staple and one of Thorogood's most identifiable and popular songs. In 1985, he performed it with Bo Diddley at Live Aid benefit concert in Philadelphia. "Who Do You Love?" continues to be a part of Thorogood's repertoire, with several live recordings, including for his 30th Anniversary Tour: Live album and video.

== Recognition and legacy ==
In 2004, Rolling Stone magazine ranked Bo Diddley's original song at number 133 on their list of the "500 Greatest Songs of All Time". The Rock and Roll Hall of Fame included Quicksilver Messenger Service's rendition on its list of the "500 Songs That Shaped Rock and Roll". In 2010, the National Academy of Recording Arts and Sciences acknowledged Bo Diddley's song with a Grammy Hall of Fame Award, which "honor[s] recordings of lasting qualitative or historical significance".

"Who Do You Love?" has been interpreted and recorded by numerous musicians. Folk singer Tom Rush recorded the song for his 1966 album Take a Little Walk with Me. Unterberger describes it as "electric rock ... Tom adapted an uncharacteristically low and playful growl for Diddley's 'Who Do You Love,' graced by early fuzz guitar distortion" with the same musicians who backed Dylan in 1965. A single version was released by Rush the same year, which reached number 39 on Billboard magazine's "Top Sellers in Top Markets" chart for Boston on May 14, 1966. A second "Who Do You Love" single by Rush was released in 1971, which appeared at number 105 on Billboard's "Bubbling Under Hot 100 Singles" chart. Rush performed the song at the Boston Symphony Hall in December 2012, which is included on his 2013 Celebrates 50 Years of Music album and DVD.

A psychedelic rock version by the Misunderstood was recorded in 1966 and released as the B-side to the "I Can Take You to the Sun" single on Fontana Records. Author Dave Thompson writes, "The Misunderstood pumped it up but kept it short, psychedelic sound effects, heart attack drums, [and] eerie harmonics". Misunderstood guitarist Glenn Ross Campbell reworked "Who Do You Love" with his later band, Juicy Lucy, which reached number 14 in the UK Singles Chart in 1970. The song features Campbell's psychedelic steel guitar lines, which Thompson describes "as fast and mean and dirty as any record could have been, a breakneck tour through the bayou swamps and dirt-track roads of the American South, powered by a guitar to make your fingers bleed".

The Woolies recorded "Who Do You Love" in an early American garage band–style that reached number 97 on Billboard Hot 100 in 1967. Additionally, Koda notes "great and varied covers over the years" by Brownsville Station, the Doors, Golden Earring, Carlos Santana, the Blues Project, the Blues Magoos, Roy Head, and John Hammond Jr. He adds "the song has held up to a number of different interpretations. Oddly, though, the majority of these drop the modified cut shuffle beat of the original, replacing it with the standard Bo Diddley tom-tom beat, losing much of the song's drive in the process."

== Notes ==
Footnotes

Citations

References

- Capace, Nancy (2001). Encyclopedia of Mississippi. Somerset Publishers. ISBN 978-0403096039.
- Gillett, Charlie (1972). The Sound of the City. Dell Publishing.
- Hal Leonard (1995). The Blues. Hal Leonard. ISBN 0-7935-5259-1.
- Helm, Levon; Davis, Stephen (2013). This Wheel's on Fire: Levon Helm and the Story of the Band. Chicago Review Press. ISBN 978-1613748794.
- Irvin, Jim (2007). The Mojo Collection: The Ultimate Music Companion (4th. ed.). Canongate Books. ISBN 978-1-84195-973-3.
- Leszczak, Bob (2013). Who Did It First?: Great Rhythm and Blues Cover Songs and Their Original Artists. Scarecrow Press. ISBN 978-0810888678.
- Marcus, Greil (2015). Mystery Train: Images of America in Rock 'n' Roll Music. Penguin Books. ISBN 978-0142181584.
- Mednick, Avram (2013). Got Live Album if You Want It!: 100 Live Recordings to Consider.
- Minturn, Neil (2005). The Last Waltz of the Band. Pendragon Press. ISBN 978-1576470930.
- Morris, Chris (2015). Los Lobos: Dream in Blue. University of Texas Press. ISBN 978-0292748231.
- Palmer, Robert (1981). Deep Blues. Penguin Books. ISBN 0-14-006223-8.
- Prown, Pete; Newquist, Harvey P. (1997). Legends of Rock Guitar: The Essential Reference of Rock's Greatest Guitarists. Hal Leonard. ISBN 978-0793540426.
- Schneider, Jason (2009). Whispering Pines: The Northern Roots of American Music. ECW Press. ISBN 978-1554905522.
- Schnieders, Bob (1986). Bo Diddley/Go Bo Diddley – Two on One (CD reissue notes). Bo Diddley. MCA/Chess Records. CHD-5904.
- Snowden, Don (1997). Bo Diddley His Best (Compilation notes). Bo Diddley. MCA/Chess Records. CHD–9373. Archived from the original on September 16, 2011.
- Spin (August 1990). "35 Blues Guitarists Who Definitely Started It All". Spin. Vol. 6, no. 5. ISSN 0886-3032.
- Sullivan, Steve (2013). Encyclopedia of Great Popular Song Recordings, Volume 2. Scarecrow Press. ISBN 978-0810882966.
- Thompson, Dave (2010). Bayou Underground: Tracing the Mythical Roots of American Popular Music. ECW Press. ISBN 978-1554906826.
- Trager, Oliver (1997). The American Book of the Dead. Simon and Schuster. ISBN 978-0684814025.
- Unterberger, Richie (1999). Unreleased Quicksilver Messenger Service – Lost Gold and Silver (CD booklet). Quicksilver Messenger Service. EMI/Capitol Records. CCM-109-2.
