= Greenwich Village Story =

- Theatrical release poster
- Directed by: Jack O'Connell
- Written by: Jack O'Connell
- Produced by: William Montgomery; Jack O'Connell
- Starring: Robert Hogan; Melinda Plank; Tani Guthrie
- Cinematography: Baird Bryant
- Edited by: Jean Begley; Carl Lerner
- Music by: Hy Gubernick
- Production company: Lion International
- Distributed by: Shawn International
- Release date: July 11, 1963
- Running time: 95 minutes
- Country: United States
- Language: English

Greenwich Village Story (also known as Birthplace of the Hootenanny, They Love as They Please and Greenwich Village) is a 1963 American feature film written and directed and written by Jack O'Connell and starring Robert Hogan.

== Plot ==
In the Greenwich Village section of Manhattan, Genie, a talented ballet dancer, is pregnant with the child of her underachieving boyfriend Brian, an aspiring novelist. Genie forgoes a professional dancing job to stay with Brian in the apartment that they share. When Brian's novel is rejected by a publisher upon whose patronage he was depending, he spends several days with his ex-girlfriend Anne, a society woman several years older than he who is often accompanied by a young advertising copywriter named George.

Not aware that Genie is pregnant, Brian has made their marriage conditional upon his success as a writer. Genie fears that Brian, who is emotionally immature, will reject her when he learns of her pregnancy. Brian is informally mentored in the ways of the world by the cynical and experienced bohemian Norman and is tempted into the world of Madison Avenue by George, with whom he has developed a friendship.

While away in the Berkshires with Anne, whose advances he gently shuns, Brian, still unaware of Genie's pregnancy, realizes that he loves and wants to marry Genie. He hurriedly returns to Greenwich Village, but Genie is difficult to trace.

== Cast ==
- Robert Hogan as Brian
- Melinda Cordell Plank as Genie, credited as Melinda Plank
- Tani Seitz as Anne
- James Frawley as Norman
- Sunja Svendsen as Claudine
- James Cresson as George
- Aaron Banks as Franko
- John G. Avildsen as Alvie
- John Brent as Poet
- Charles Gossett as Judge

== Production ==
Melinda Cordell Plank, was a member of the American Ballet Theatre. Sunja Svendsen was a New York student of Étienne Decroux. Tani Seitz was also known as Tani Guthrie, is the twin sister of actress Dran Seitz.

The film was shot on location in Greenwich Village and in the Berkshires, including a nude swimming scene filmed at Lake Garfield, Massachusetts. According to director Jack O'Connell, the loud sounds of motorboat engines in the sequence were replaced in the final soundtrack by prerecorded crickets.

O'Connell had earlier worked as second assistant director for Michelangelo Antonioni's L'Avventura (1960), while cinematographer Baird Bryant later worked as an uncredited assistant to László Kovács for Easy Rider (1969) and shot that film's LSD trip sequence in a New Orleans cemetery.

== Reception ==
In a contemporary review for The New York Times, critic A. H. Weiler wrote "Life, Mr. O'Connell apparently has learned, is real and earnest and happy Hollywood endings occur only on the West Coast. His leads and the supporting players, most of whom have had experience in the theater and television, behave, for the most part, naturally and unaffectedly. There are many evidences of amateurism, but these may be forgiven for the obvious sincerity they contribute to their assignments."

Kine Weekly wrote: "While the picture has points to recommend it, the artistic validity is much lessened by the fact that the author-producer-director has grafted an essentially melodramatic story onto real backgrounds of Greenwich Village, containing real people going about their normally unusual daily rounds."

Boxoffice wrote: "This is a first-rate example of realistic, strikingly original independent filmmaking. ... O'Connell, who gained film experience with Federico Fellini and Michelangelo Antonioni in Italy, has achieved some of these masters' off-beat authenticity and appeal. ... His use of actual Village locations, including an opening during a Washington Square folk-sing and the crowded beatnik bars and hangouts, is superb and the photography by Baird Bryant is striking."
