= James Neil Hollingworth =

American rock band manager and writer (1933–1996)

- Born: James Neil Hollingworth; January 3, 1933; Painesville, Ohio, U.S.
- Died: February 28, 1996 (aged 63); Santa Rosa, California, U.S.
- Occupations: band manager, writer
- Spouse: Dakota (formerly Louise) Durham
- Children: Weyaka (formerly Alexandra) Carnacchi
- Writing career
- Pen name: Ambrose Hollingworth Redmoon
- Language: English

James Neil Hollingworth (1933–1996) was a beatnik, hippie, writer, paraplegic, and former manager of the psychedelic folk rock bands Quicksilver Messenger Service and the Ace of Cups. After he suffered disabling injuries in a car crash near Muir Beach, California in 1967, the management of both bands were assumed by Ron Polte.

He wrote under the pseudonym Ambrose Hollingworth Redmoon.

Larry Fink's 2014 book, The Beats, with text by Robert Cordier (1933-2020), contains numerous photos of Hollingworth from 1959.

A well-known aphorism was written by Hollingworth in 1991:

"I find such expressions as 'peaceful warrior' offensive, trivializing, and insulting. 'Peaceful warrior' is far more than a contradiction in terms. The function of a warrior is to eliminate an exterior enemy presence. Cowardice is a serious vice. Courage is not the absence of fear, but rather the judgment that something else is more important than one's fear. The timid presume it is lack of fear that allows the brave to act when the timid do not. But to take action when one is not afraid is easy. To refrain when afraid is also easy. To take action regardless of fear is brave."

Ambrose was the founder or co-founder of the Six-Day School located high on Mount Shasta, a mountain top in Siskiyou County, California. It was a school that prepared students for survival in the midst of Armageddon through map and compass reading, survival in the wilderness, and occult studies. Students lived in tepees and worked by tending the orchards and gardens. The property was previously called Top of the World Ranch.
