= What About Me (Quicksilver Messenger Service album) =

Studio album by Quicksilver Messenger Service
- Released: December 1970
- Recorded: May – June 1970
- Genre: Psychedelic rock, acid rock
- Length: 45:09
- Label: Capitol
- Producer: John Palladino

Quicksilver Messenger Service chronology
Just for Love (1970)	What About Me (1970)	Quicksilver (1971)

What About Me is the fifth album by American psychedelic rock band Quicksilver Messenger Service. Released in December 1970 and recorded partly at the same sessions that produced Just for Love, the album is the last to feature pianist Nicky Hopkins and the last pre-reunion effort to feature founding members David Freiberg and John Cipollina. Several tracks, including "Baby Baby", "Subway" and "Long Haired Lady" had been played regularly at shows through 1970, previewing the album.

The album became the band's fourth and final to hit the top 30 on Billboard, as the group remained popular thanks to the minor hit "Fresh Air" from the previous album. The title track "What About Me" was also released as a single, charting at #100.

== Reception ==
Professional ratings
Review scores
Source	Rating
Allmusic	3/5 stars
Christgau's Record Guide	C−

Writing for Allmusic, music critic Lindsay Planer wrote of the album "Musically, there is little to delineate the fifth long-player from Quicksilver Messenger Service, What About Me, from their previous effort, Just for Love. Not surprisingly, material for both was initiated during a prolific two-month retreat..."

== Track listing ==
=== Side one ===
1. "What About Me" (Jesse Oris Farrow) – 6:43
2. "Local Color" (John Cipollina) – 3:00
3. "Baby Baby" (Farrow) – 4:44
4. "Won't Kill Me" (David Freiberg) – 2:32
5. "Long Haired Lady" (Farrow) – 5:55

=== Side two ===
1. "Subway" (Gary Duncan, Farrow) – 4:29
2. "Spindrifter" (Nicky Hopkins) – 4:38
3. "Good Old Rock and Roll" (Farrow) – 2:30
4. "All in My Mind" (Duncan, Farrow) – 3:48
5. "Call on Me" (Farrow) – 7:36

== Personnel ==
Quicksilver Messenger Service

- Dino Valenti – lead vocals (except on "Won't Kill Me"), guitar, percussion
- Gary Duncan – guitar, backing vocals, bass, percussion, organ
- John Cipollina – guitar, percussion
- David Freiberg – bass, backing vocals, lead vocal on "Won't Kill Me", guitar
- Greg Elmore – drums, percussion
- Nicky Hopkins – piano (except on "What About Me", "Baby Baby", "Subway", and "Call on Me")
- Mark Naftalin – piano on "What About Me", "Baby Baby", and "Call on Me"

Additional musicians on "What About Me" and "Call on Me"

- Martin Fierro – tenor and alto saxophone, flute
- Frank Morin – tenor saxophone
- Pat O'Hara – trombone
- Jose Rico Reyes – conga, percussion, backing vocals
- Ron Taormina – baritone and soprano saxophone

== Charts ==
Album

Year	Chart	Position
1971	Billboard Pop Albums	26

Single

Year	Single	Chart	Position
1971	What About Me	Billboard Hot 100	100
