= Rolling Thunder (album) =

Studio album by Mickey Hart
- Released: September 1972
- Studios: Mickey's Barn, Marin County, California
- Genre: Rock
- Length: 39:06
- Label: Warner Bros.

Mickey Hart chronology
Rolling Thunder (1972)	Diga (1976)

Professional ratings
Review scores
Source	Rating
Allmusic	4/5 stars
Christgau's Record Guide	C+

Rolling Thunder is the first solo album by Grateful Dead drummer Mickey Hart.

Although Hart had temporarily left the Grateful Dead at the time he made Rolling Thunder, members of the Dead play on the album, along with several other well-known musicians from the San Francisco Bay Area music scene. Also featured are classical tabla players Zakir Hussain and his father Alla Rakha. The album contains early versions of two songs co-written by Bob Weir that later became Grateful Dead concert staples – "Playing in the Band" and "Greatest Story Ever Told" (called "Pump Song" on this album).

The cover art for Rolling Thunder was created by Alton Kelly and Stanley Mouse's Kelly/Mouse Studios.

The album was named after the Shoshone medicine man, shaman, teacher, and activist, Rolling Thunder, who was a friend of Mickey Hart and the Grateful Dead and whose voice is heard on the first track.

In 1986, Relix Records reissued the album on vinyl, utilizing the original master recordings and color separations. In 1989, the album was released on CD on the Grateful Dead label. It was subsequently re-released by Relix.

== Track listing ==
=== Side One ===
1. "Rolling Thunder/Shoshone Invocation" (Rolling Thunder) – 0:46
2. "The Main Ten (Playing in the Band)" (Hart, Weir, Hunter) – 7:04
3. "Fletcher Carnaby" (Hart, Hunter) – 4:14
4. "The Chase (Progress)" (Hart) – 4:04
5. "Blind John" (C.J. Stetson, Peter Monk) – 3:48

=== Side Two ===
1. "Young Man" (Hart, Monk) – 2:41
2. "Deep, Wide, and Frequent" (Hart) – 5:33
3. "Pump Song" (Weir, Hart, Hunter) – 4:42
4. "Granma's Cookies" (Hart) – 3:00
5. "Hangin' On" (Stetson, Monk; arranged by Mickey Hart) – 3:17

== Personnel ==
=== By track ===
Rolling Thunder Chant

- Mike and Nancy Hinton – marimba
- Alla Rakha, Zakir Hussain – tabla

The Main Ten (Playing in the Band)

- John Cipollina – guitar
- Bob Weir – guitar, vocals
- Jerry Garcia – guitar, vocals
- Tower of Power – horn section
- Stephen Stills – bass
- Mickey Hart – drums
- Carmelo Garcia – timbales

Fletcher Carnaby

- Sam Andrew – guitar
- John Cipollina – guitar
- Robbie Stokes – guitar
- Mickey Hart – drums, percussion
- David Freiberg – vocals, bass, piano
- Tower of Power – horn section
- Steven Schuster – flute

The Chase (Progress)

- Jerry Garcia – guitar
- Mickey Hart – drums
- Zakir Hussain – tabla

Blind John

- Steven Schuster – flute
- Grace Slick – piano, vocals
- Mickey Hart – field drum, timpani
- Greg Errico – drums
- Tower of Power – horn section
- Barry Melton – acoustic guitar, vocals
- David Freiberg – acoustic guitar, vocals
- Paul Kantner – vocals

Young Man

- Barry Melton – guitar
- John Cipollina – guitar
- Robbie Stokes – guitar
- David Freiberg – bass, vocals
- Mickey Hart – drums
- Bob Weir – vocals
- Phil Lesh – vocals
- Carmelo Garcia – timbales, conga

Deep, Wide and Frequent

- Mickey Hart – drums
- David Freiberg – bass
- Robbie Stokes – guitar
- Jerry Garcia – guitar
- John Cipollina – guitar
- Terry Haggerty – guitar (from Sons of Champlin)
- Bill Champlin – organ
- Tower of Power – horn section
- Carmelo Garcia – timbales, congas

Pump Song

- Robbie Stokes – guitar
- Bob Weir – guitar, vocals
- Jerry Garcia – insect fear
- Robbie Stokes – bass
- Phil Lesh – bass
- Tower of Power – horn section
- Mickey Hart – drums, percussion
- David Freiberg – piano, water pump

Granma's Cookies

- Jerry Garcia – guitar
- Mickey Hart – drums
- Zakir Hussain – tabla

Hangin' On

- Barry Melton – guitar
- Robbie Stokes – guitar
- John Cipollina – guitar
- David Freiberg – bass, piano, viola, vocals
- Mickey Hart – drums
- Tower of Power – horn section

=== Production ===
- Dan Healy, Rick Davis, John Wollman, David Freiberg, Mickey Hart – engineers
- Phil Lesh, Jerry Garcia, Mickey Hart, David Freiberg, Dan Healy, Stephen Stills – mixdown
- Rock Scully – direction
- Recorded at Mickey's Barn, Marin County, CA
- Mixed at Alembic Studios, San Francisco
- Ed Thrasher – art direction
- Ron Rakow, Bruce Baxter – photography
