= Pride of Man =

1964 folk song by Hamilton Camp

Song by Hamilton Camp

from the album Paths of Victory
- Released: 1964
- Genre: Folk
- Length: 2:30
- Label: Elektra
- Songwriter: Hamilton Camp
- Producer: Jim Dickson

"Pride of Man" is a 1964 song by Hamilton Camp. It is Camp's best-known composition.

Rife with apocalyptic imagery and religious language ("Can't you see that flash of fire / Ten times brighter than the day... Shout a warning to the nations that the sword of God is raised / On Babylon that mighty city, rich in treasure, wide in fame... Oh God, the pride of man, broken in the dust again"), the song was written shortly after Camp's initiation into the Subud spiritual movement.

"Pride of Man" debuted on Camp's 1964 album Paths of Victory, but achieved more notice when covered by Gordon Lightfoot on his 1966 debut album Lightfoot!. "Pride of Man" was the opening track on Quicksilver Messenger Service's eponymous 1968 debut album and was released as a single on the B-side of "Dino's Song"; Rolling Stone described this version as having been "carr[ied] off admirably". Quicksilver Messenger Service regularly performed the song in concert.

Gram Parsons' cover was included on the album Another Side of This Life: The Lost Recordings of Gram Parsons, released in 2000 but recorded in 1965 and 1966. The song has been covered by other musicians, such as Tony Rice on Church Street Blues (1983), Ted Quinn on Help Wanted, and Punch Brothers on Hell on Church Street. Camp's version of the song was re-released on the 2006 five-disc compilation album Forever Changing — The Golden Age of Elektra Records - 1963-1973.
