= Revolution (1968 film) =

- Film poster
- Directed by: Jack O'Connell
- Written by: Norman Martin, Jack O'Connell
- Produced by: Jack O'Connell
- Music by: Various artists
- Distributed by: United Artists
- Release date: June 5, 1968
- Running time: 93 minutes
- Country: United States
- Language: English

Revolution is a documentary film by Jack O'Connell made in San Francisco in 1967. In 1986, it was re-released with added reminiscences as The Hippie Revolution.

== Production ==
The project's original title was Revolution: The Flowering of the Hippie Concept, originally conceived by Jack O'Connell in February 1967 to be the definitive documentary of the new hippie movement flowering at the time in San Francisco's Haight-Ashbury district. O'Connell hired cameraman Bill Godsey to persuade his hippie friends in the Haight that they would be accurately represented. A 20 member crew lived among and filmed the hippies for seven weeks in the late spring and summer of 1967 (at the peak of the Summer of Love) with post-production underway by the fall. A projected February 1968 release date was postponed, however, when it was learned that a competing documentary, The Hippie Revolt, was being rushed to release at the same time.

== Content ==
The film follows Louise "Today" Malone, a middle class runaway originally from Arizona, as she settles in Haight-Ashbury. The film opens with scenes of the June 21, 1967 Summer Solstice Celebration in Golden Gate Park, San Francisco, then follows Today around the district as she panhandles for spare change, dances at the Fillmore and Avalon ballrooms, sells underground papers to passersby, takes LSD with friends, and hangs out at Golden Gate Park. Along the way many street hippies are interviewed along with psychiatrists, policemen, and doctors who had a more cautious take on the phenomenon, with much debate on the safety of taking LSD. Additional scenes looking at revolutionaries, street theater, nudist dance (with added music and psychedelic lighting) and the Hare Krishna movement are also included. O’Connell described his documentary as “a tour covering almost the entire canvas of the hippies’ art, blasting music, drugs, dance, philosophy and sex life".

Although most interviewees are not named some of them have been identified, such as geneticist Kurt Hirschhorn, police chief Frank Jordan, pastor Cecil Williams and journalist Herb Caen. Actress and author Daria Halprin appears in the film as herself along with Ronnie Davis, a founder of the San Francisco Mime Troupe. Also appearing in the film (though not on the soundtrack album) are the Ace of Cups, Country Joe and the Fish, and Dan Hicks.

== Release and reception ==
Revolution was to have been premiered in May at the 1968 Cannes Film Festival, but the festival was officially cancelled before it could be shown due to the ongoing turmoil of May 1968 in France. The first screening was on June 5 in St. Louis, which was followed by a wide release in New York and Los Angeles that August. Soon after, the National Catholic Office of Motion Pictures condemned the film for its depictions of "free love" and extensive nudity. Box office receipts were disappointing (a dispute with union projectionists in NYC didn't help) and while reviews were generally positive, The New York Times noted sadly that the utopianism depicted in the film had dissipated over the past year since it had been filmed. Similarly, DA Latimer of East Village Other opined that while "it's fun, it's pleasant, it's a gas...it's all about love, and love is last summer's bag; Summer '68 is the summer of the Molotov cocktail, of rifle bullets shattering patrol car windows, shotgun pellets in cops' backs. This Revolution flick is another revolution entirely: it's last year's revolution, one that swiftly and silently vanished away, quite away, from losing patience with itself". Because of initially poor box office, UA tried to market Revolution as an exploitation film with ads claiming to expose "weird rites of the hippies, how they live, love and die in their wild, wild world!"

== Rerelease ==
The film was rereleased in 1986 as The Hippie Revolution featuring a different edit, including contemporary interviews with some of the original participants. Today Malone was shown with her children living an ordinary middle class lifestyle, although she had positive things to say as she looked back at the era. Outtake footage originally shot in 1967 was also included, including an interview with San Francisco rock poster artist Wes Wilson.

== Soundtrack ==
The soundtrack album features Steve Miller Band, Quicksilver Messenger Service, and Mother Earth who also appear in the film. The selections by The Steve Miller Band and Quicksilver Messenger Service represent their earliest studio recordings, produced in the summer and fall of 1967 and thus predating their debut albums. It was released in 1968 by United Artists Records (UAS 5185) and produced by Ben Shapiro.

=== Track listing ===
Side 1
No.	Title	Writer(s)	Length
1.	"Revolution" (Mother Earth)	Jack O'Connell, Norman Martin	2:56
2.	"Codine" (Quicksilver Messenger Service)	Buffy St. Marie	5:20
3.	"Superbyrd" (Steve Miller Band)	Steve Miller	4:37
4.	"Your Old Lady" (Steve Miller Band)	Elmo Glick, King Curtis, O'Kelly Isley, Jr.	5:50

Side 2
No.	Title	Writer(s)	Length
1.	"Babe, I'm Gonna Leave You" (Quicksilver Messenger Service)	Anne Bredon, Erik Darling, Paul Bennett	5:03
2.	"Without Love" (Mother Earth)	Danny Small	4:37
3.	"Mercury Blues" (Steve Miller Band)	K. C. Douglas, Bob Geddins	2:20
4.	"Stranger in My Home Town" (Mother Earth)	Percy Mayfield	5:09

== See also ==
- List of American films of 1968
