= The Ace of Cups =

American rock band

Ace of Cups
- l-r Marla Hunt, Denise Kaufman, Diane Vitalich, Mary Ellen Simpson, Mary Gannon

Background information
- Origin: San Francisco, California, United States
- Genres: Rock, R&B, folk rock
- Years active: 1967–1972, 2017–present
- Label: High Moon
- Members: Mary Gannon; Marla Hunt; Mary Ellen Simpson; Diane Vitalich; Denise Kaufman (Jewkes 1968-1971); Dallis Craft
- Past members: —; Joe Allegra; Jerry Granelli; Noel Jewkes; Lolly Lewis
- Website: Official website

Ace of Cups is an American rock band formed in San Francisco in 1967 during the Summer of Love era. It has been described as one of the first all-female rock bands.

The members of Ace of Cups were Mary Gannon (bass), Marla Hunt (organ, piano), Denise Kaufman (guitar, harmonica), Mary Ellen Simpson (lead guitar), and Diane Vitalich (drums). Lead vocals were sung by all members of the band including Vitalich, and all five sang backup. The songwriting, too, was divided among the band members.

== Background ==
Gannon was born in New York and moved to San Francisco in the early 1960s. She played bass for a short while in a band called Daemon Lover. Gannon was introduced to Hunt through a mutual friend. Gannon suggested that they form an all-female rock band.

Hunt was born in San Francisco but grew up in Los Angeles. She was from a musical family, had been playing the piano by ear since she was three, and writing songs since she was 8. She moved back to San Francisco in the mid 1960s and joined a commune at 408 Ashbury St. which was known by the counter culture as a gathering place where musicians met and the psychedelic scene thrived. Hunt then moved into the Waller Street Apt where Hunt and Gannon started working on songs together.

Simpson was from Indio, California. She began playing the guitar when she was 12. Like Gannon and Hunt, she moved to San Francisco in the early 1960s. Simpson and Vitalich joined Gannon and Hunt's band around the same time.

Vitalich, the drummer for the band, was a native of San Francisco. From grammar school through high school she had always wanted to play the drums, but was told drums were for boys. She met a drummer who taught her a few beats then had her sit in with his band. She started sitting in with other bands including Bill Haley and the Comets. When the Ace of Cups opened for The Steve Miller Band, she covered for Miller’s drummer who was late for the gig. Vitalich, with the Ace Of Cups, recorded background vocals with notable bands such as Jefferson Airplane and Quicksilver Messenger Service. She grew into a lead singer who also played drums.

The last woman to join Ace of Cups was Kaufman. She also had the most colorful background of the group. Kaufman had been arrested during the Free Speech Movement at Berkeley, and she was involved with Ken Kesey and the Merry Pranksters (who dubbed her "Mary Microgram"). She had been engaged to Jann Wenner when they were 20 years old, before he started Rolling Stone magazine. In a 1995 interview, Hunt remembered her first impression of Kaufman:

I'll never forget when she walked in. She's wearing cowboy boots, a very short skirt, a wild fur coat and a fireman's hat. Her hair's stickin' straight out on the side. She's got these big glasses and this big guitar case—she's like 5'3" and it's almost as big as she is. Even in San Francisco she stood out.

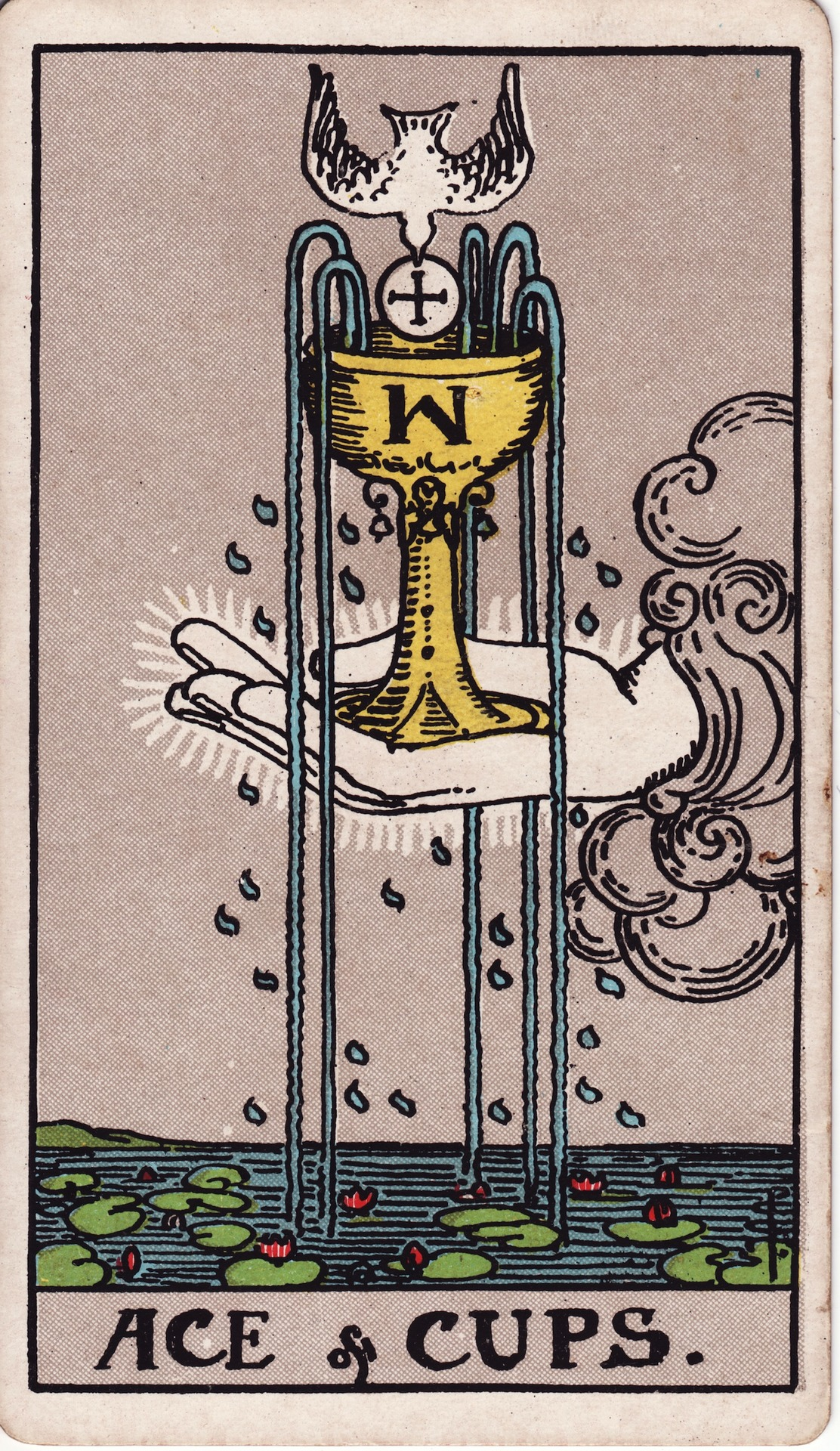
Ace of Cups was named after the tarot card, shown here.

The band was named Ace of Cups by their manager, astrologer Ambrose Hollingworth, after the Ace of Cups tarot card, which shows a cup with five streams of water. He told the women that the streams represented the five of them, and that they should "go with the flow" to see where the music would take them.

=== Management ===
Hollingworth, who also managed Quicksilver Messenger Service became a paraplegic as a result of an automobile crash near Muir Beach, California in 1967. Hollingworth's stewardship transferred to Ron Polte. Polte was known for going to great lengths to accommodate the welfare of his musicians. When perennial studio musician Nicky Hopkins joined Quicksilver in 1969, it was the first and only band that included him in its performing and recording revenues. Hollingworth died in 1996, and Polte in 2016.

== Late 1960s ==
Ace of Cups made their debut in the early spring of 1967. In late June, Jimi Hendrix invited the band to open for him at a free concert in Golden Gate Park. In London that December, Hendrix told Melody Maker:

"I heard some groovy sounds last time in the States, like this girl group, Ace of Cups, who write their own songs and the lead guitarist is hell, really great."

In San Francisco, Polte had the Ace of Cups and Quicksilver playing regularly, the Cups headlining at smaller clubs such as The Matrix and performing as the opening act at larger venues such as the Avalon Ballroom and the Fillmore. In mid-1968, the band appeared on a local television program, West Pole, along with San Francisco legends Jefferson Airplane and the Grateful Dead. In 1969, they opened for The Band's first concert as The Band along with The Sons of Champlin.

Several record companies were interested in signing Ace of Cups, but Hollingworth and then Polte felt the band was worth more than the record companies were offering. Also, some of the band members were concerned that a record contract might require the band to tour, and they were worried that family pressures would interfere. Consequently, Ace of Cups never made any professional recordings of their own, although in 1969 they contributed vocals to Jefferson Airplane's Volunteers, Mike Bloomfield's It's Not Killing Me, and Nick Gravenites' My Labors. At the Altamont Speedway Free Festival that December, Kaufman (who had married saxophonist Noel Jewkes and was pregnant) was hit in the head by a full beer bottle. Nobody knew who threw the bottle, but Ralph J. Gleason wrote, "Hell's Angels played catch with full beer cans all afternoon". She suffered a fractured skull and needed emergency surgery at San Francisco's Mt. Zion Hospital to remove a quarter-sized piece of bone above her eye.

== 1970s ==
Several factors led to the break-up of Ace of Cups. Some of the band members were frustrated at the group's lack of commercial success. Others were interested in other pursuits. Several members had children and found it difficult to balance motherhood and a musical career.

In the early 1970s, several men joined the band to replace the women who had left. Kaufman was the last remaining member from the original line-up when the band folded in 1972.

== 2000s ==
In 2003, Ace Records released It's Bad for You But Buy It!, a CD of "rehearsals, demos, TV soundstage recordings, and in-concert tapes" of Ace of Cups. The CD was generally well received.

The band's performances on the 1968 television program West Pole were released on DVD in 2008 by Eagle Vision.

== 2010s ==
As the decades passed, band members pursued other personal and creative endeavors, occasionally playing music both individually and collectively when opportunities arose. On May 14, 2011, Ace of Cups played Wavy Gravy’s 75th birthday party and SEVA Foundation benefit. George Baer Wallace, founder of High Moon Records, was there to talk to the band about releasing archival concert recordings. He was so moved by their spirit and spark that he offered the Ace Of Cups the opportunity to record their first studio album.

In 2016, the band began work on their debut studio album. Four of the band's original members participated: Mary Gannon (claps), Denise Kaufman (bass, harmonica), Mary Ellen Simpson (lead guitar), and Diane Vitalich (drums). The album was produced by Dan Shea (Mariah Carey, Santana, Jennifer Lopez), and features contributions from Jorma Kaukonen and Jack Casady (Jefferson Airplane, Hot Tuna), David Freiberg (Quicksilver Messenger Service), Barry Melton (Country Joe & The Fish), Pete Sears (Jefferson Starship, Rod Stewart, Hot Tuna), David Grisman, Steve Kimock (Zero, RatDog), Terry Haggerty (Sons of Champlin), Norman Mayell (Sopwith Camel), Sid Page and Charlie Musselwhite, as well as lead vocal turns by Bob Weir (Grateful Dead), Taj Mahal, Buffy Sainte-Marie and Peter Coyote. On November 9, 2018, Ace of Cups was released on High Moon Records. The reincarnated Ace of Cups is Mary Gannon, Denise Kaufman, Mary Ellen Simpson, Diane Vitalich, and Dallis Craft.

== 2020s ==
The Ace of Cups released their sophomore album Sing Your Dreams on October 2, 2020 via High Moon Records. The album is a collection of 12 songs and stories, produced by Dan Shea (Santana, Mariah Carey, Phil Collins, Bruce Hornsby), and features collaborations with Jackson Browne (who duets on album closer ‘Slowest River’), Sheila E. and the Escovedo Family, Bakithi Kumalo (whose iconic bass-playing was integral to the sound of Paul Simon’s Graceland), jam-band guitar luminary Steve Kimock (Jerry Garcia named him his ‘favorite unknown guitarist’), peace activist and counterculture icon Wavy Gravy, Jack Casady (Jefferson Airplane, Hot Tuna), and David Freiberg (Quicksilver Messenger Service, Jefferson Airplane/Starship).

== Discography ==
=== Albums ===
- It's Bad For You But Buy It! (Big Beat/2003) compilation
- Ace Of Cups 2XLP/2XCD (High Moon/2018)
- Sing Your Dreams (High Moon/2020)

=== Compilation appearances ===
- Girls In The Garage Volume 5 (Romulan/1988) - "Grass Is Always Greener"
- Love Is The Song We Sing (San Francisco Nuggets 1968-1970) 4XCD (Rhino/2007) - "Glue" [as The Ace Of Cups]
- Cocktail Mo1618v 2XCD (La Bande on De La Revolte) (Le Maquis/2001) - "Glue" [as The Ace Of Cups]
- Girls With Guitars (Ace/2014) - "Stones" [as The Ace Of Cups]
- The Rebel Kind: Girls With Guitars 3 (Ace/2014) - "Stones"
- Girls In The Garage-A Collection Of Girl Garage And Girl Groups From The 60s! Volumes 1-6 6XCD (Past & Present/2018)
- Girls With Guitars Gonna Shake (Ace/2022) - "Circles" [as The Ace Of Cups]
- Shouting Out Loud cassette (Noods Radio) - "Stones"

== See also ==
- List of all-female bands
- List of bands from the San Francisco Bay Area
