= Jim Murray (musician) =

Guitarist and harmonica player (1942–2013)

- Born: 30 May 1942
- Died: 1 March 2013 (aged 70)
- Genres: Blues rock
- Occupation: Musician
- Instruments: Guitar; harmonica

Jim Murray (30 May 1942 – 1 March 2013) was a guitarist and harmonica player for the psychedelic blues rock band Quicksilver Messenger Service. He also handled lead and background vocals on some songs. He left the band in late 1967 shortly before they recorded their first album.

The outtakes from the movie Monterey Pop have rare footage of Quicksilver from their early days as a quintet, performing "Dino's Song" on which Murray played rhythm guitar. After Murray left, the group remained a quartet until the lead vocalist slot was filled by Dino Valenti.

In 1970 Murray was briefly in John Cipollina's post-Quicksilver band Copperhead, and after leaving Copperhead he sometimes sat in with them live.
