= David Freiberg =

American musician (born 1938)

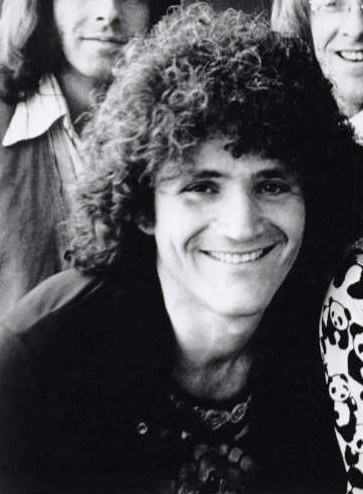
- Freiberg as a member of Jefferson Starship in 1976.

Background information
- Born: August 24, 1938 (age 88); Boston, Massachusetts, USA
- Genres: Psychedelic rock, folk, progressive rock, acid rock
- Occupation: Musician
- Instruments: Vocals, bass guitar, keyboards, guitar
- Years active: 1960s–present
- Formerly of: David & Michaela; Quicksilver Messenger Service; Jefferson Airplane; Jefferson Starship; The Linda Imperial Band

David Freiberg (/ˈfraɪbərɡ/; born August 24, 1938) is an American musician best known for contributing vocals, keyboards, electric bass, guitar, viola and percussion as a member of Quicksilver Messenger Service, Jefferson Airplane, and Jefferson Starship. Among other tracks, he co-wrote "Jane", a hit for Jefferson Starship.

== Career ==
=== Singer-songwriter ===
Classically trained in violin and viola, Freiberg began his career moonlighting as a coffeehouse singer-songwriter (playing acoustic guitar) during the American folk music revival while working for a railroad. For a while, he shared a house in Venice, California, with David Crosby and Paul Kantner before being briefly jailed for marijuana possession. Prior to being incarcerated, he also became acquainted with Dino Valenti, then Crosby's nominal roommate on a houseboat in Sausalito, California. During his time as a coffee house folk singer, he was part of the duo David & Michaela. Along with the Sherwood Singers, Fred Thompson, The Willow Creek Ramblers, The Steeltown II, LeSesne Hilton, John MacQuarrie, Randy Boone and the Calimbo Steel Band, David & Michaela appeared at Pasadena's 1st Annual Folk Festival, which was held at 568 East Mount Curve Avenue, Altadena, Los Angeles County in August 1963. David & Michaela made a demo at CBS studios, and Elektra producer Paul Rothchild proposed fitting them into a bigger folk group. But the onset of the Beatles spelled the end of David & Michaela, and incentive for Freiberg to switch to rock and electric instruments."

=== Quicksilver Messenger Service ===
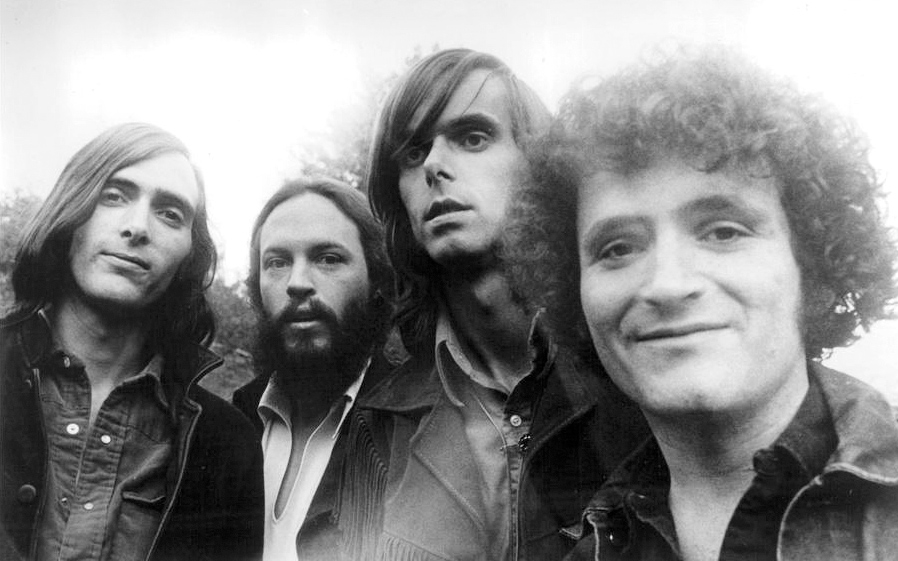
Freiberg (far right) with Quicksilver Messenger Service in 1970

Following his release, Freiberg co-founded Quicksilver Messenger Service with guitarists John Cipollina, Jim Murray and Gary Duncan and drummer Greg Elmore in 1965. The founding took place shortly after Valenti, who had recently hired the musicians for his backing band following the folk rock explosion, was imprisoned for drugs. Due to the surfeit of guitarists in the group, Freiberg (who was only tangentially acquainted with his bandmates through their mutual friendship with Valenti, with Cipollina remarking that they had been instructed to "take care" of him) was assigned to play electric bass.

Freiberg shared lead vocals with Gary Duncan for much of the band's history and regularly contributed additional guitar and keyboards to their studio recordings. As the "most folk-rooted member" of Quicksilver, he also reworked several songs from the folk revival and singer-songwriter repertoires (most notably Hamilton Camp's "Pride of Man") for the group. He would play on six of the eight Quicksilver albums. As of 2026, he is the last remaining member of the band with the passing of Greg Elmore.

Though not as commercially successful as contemporaries like Jefferson Airplane, Big Brother and the Holding Company and the Grateful Dead, Quicksilver was integral to the development of the San Francisco sound. In addition to earning three Billboard Top 100 hits, several of their albums ranked in the Top 30 of the magazine's album chart. He continued to serve as the group's bassist and contribute to the band's songwriting until September 1971, when he left the group to begin another prison sentence for marijuana possession. His most notable songwriting contributions include "The Fool" and "Light Your Windows", both co-written with Duncan.

=== Jefferson Airplane ===
Shortly after being released from his second stint in jail in 1972, Freiberg joined Jefferson Airplane at the behest of Kantner, belatedly replacing Marty Balin on vocals and tambourine for the tour that supported Long John Silver. He subsequently appeared on Thirty Seconds Over Winterland (1973), a live album culled from those performances. After the tour ended, Freiberg, Kantner, and Slick released Baron Von Tollbooth & the Chrome Nun as a trio in 1973.

=== Jefferson Starship ===
After a long interregnum in which the fate of the band was in question (forcing Freiberg to briefly draw unemployment after RCA Records rescinded Jefferson Airplane's salaries), the final Jefferson Airplane lineup reformed as Jefferson Starship in early 1974 following the departure of lead guitarist Jorma Kaukonen and bassist Jack Casady. He remained with the group for nearly eleven years, departing shortly after the formation of Starship in early 1985 due to creative differences over the selection and recording of "We Built This City" with Grace Slick (who, according to longtime manager Bill Thompson, considered Freiberg to be "dead weight") and the atypically outsized role of producer Peter Wolf; during this period, Wolf had in effect superseded Freiberg as the band's principal keyboardist in the studio and select live performances. Freiberg would later say of the departure: "The only thing real on that song were the vocals and the guitar. I was useless, so I left." He also clarified that “it completely turned away from anything organic, and it wasn’t really what I did.”

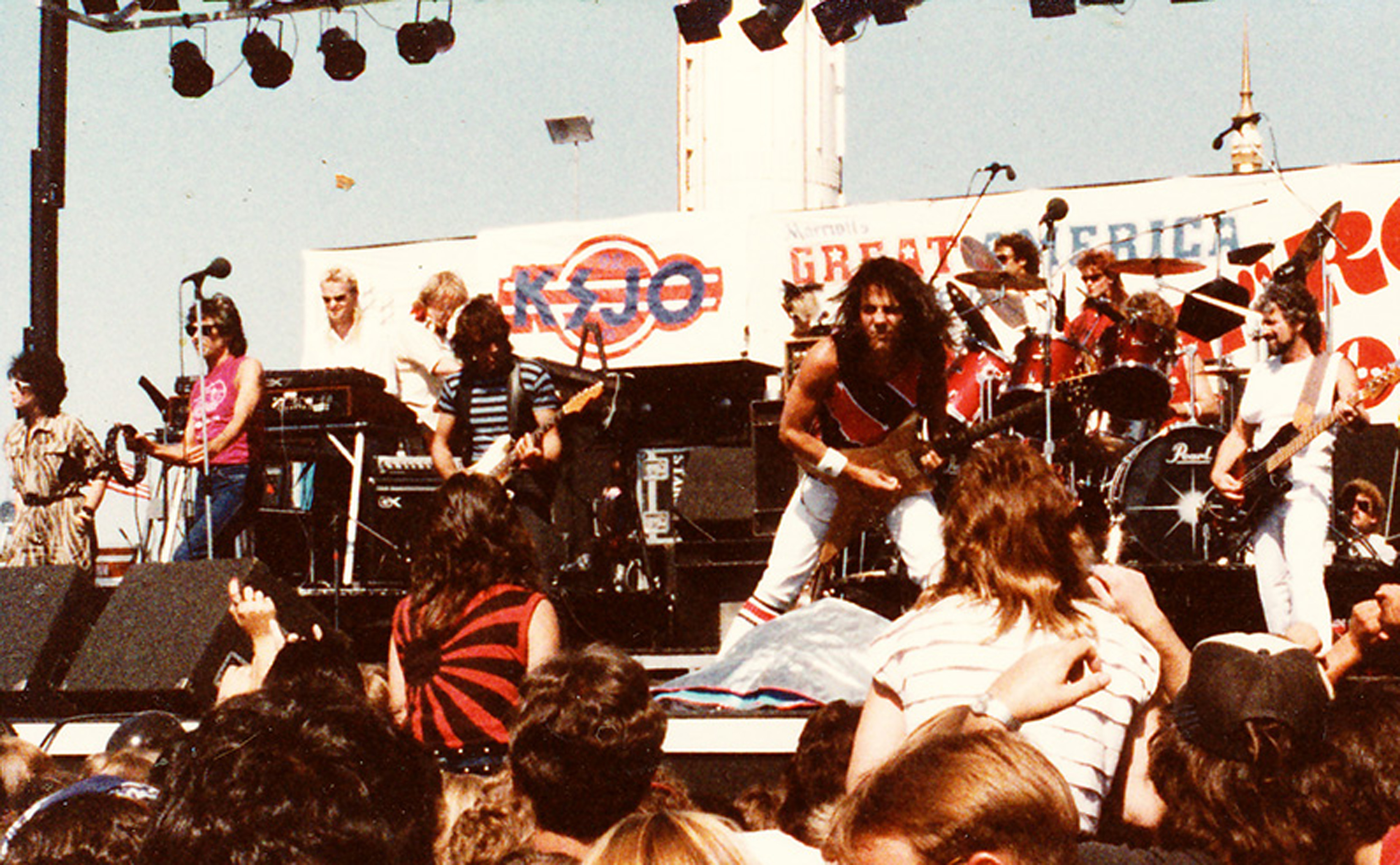
Freiberg (far right) playing bass guitar onstage with Jefferson Starship in 1984

Although Freiberg (who primarily played keyboards) and fellow multi-instrumentalist Pete Sears (who generally played bass) frequently alternated on both instruments throughout their respective tenures in the group, Ben Fong-Torres noted in a 1978 profile of the group that "Freiberg considers himself primarily a bass player." Freiberg himself elaborated upon this distinction in a 1997 interview with John Barthel: "I am not really a keyboard player. I use it for input to a computer now, and stuff like that, but it never was my instrument. I just did it for writing songs because it is a musical typewriter, basically, that is what it is."

Never a prolific songwriter and characterized by Fong-Torres as "essentially a back-up musician" in Jefferson Starship, Freiberg notably served as the primary composer of "Jane." According to Rolling Stone, the song "was instrumental in moving them into a more commercial, harder-rock direction." "Jane" was a No. 14 hit for the group in 1979 at a crucial juncture immediately following the departures of Slick and Balin and the integration of Mickey Thomas as lead singer. It has since been prominently showcased in the 2009 video game Grand Theft Auto IV: The Lost and Damned and as the opening theme of the Wet Hot American Summer franchise.

Freiberg also developed the "distinctive" organ riff of Balin's "Miracles," the group's most successful single.

Following his departure from Jefferson Starship, Freiberg built and operated a studio in Marin County, often working with local musicians. According to Bruce Arnold of Orpheus, "He has developed a wonderful way of recording my acoustic guitar and has a $100,000 voice mike that will make anyone sound good."

He was the only member of Quicksilver Messenger Service to participate in the majority of the Planet Earth Rock and Roll Orchestra records (a series of solo albums and unreleased recordings by Crosby, Kantner and others that drew upon much of the era's Bay Area-based talent) and briefly provided uncredited accompaniment for The Ace of Cups, a groundbreaking all-female San Francisco band.

=== Return to Jefferson Starship ===
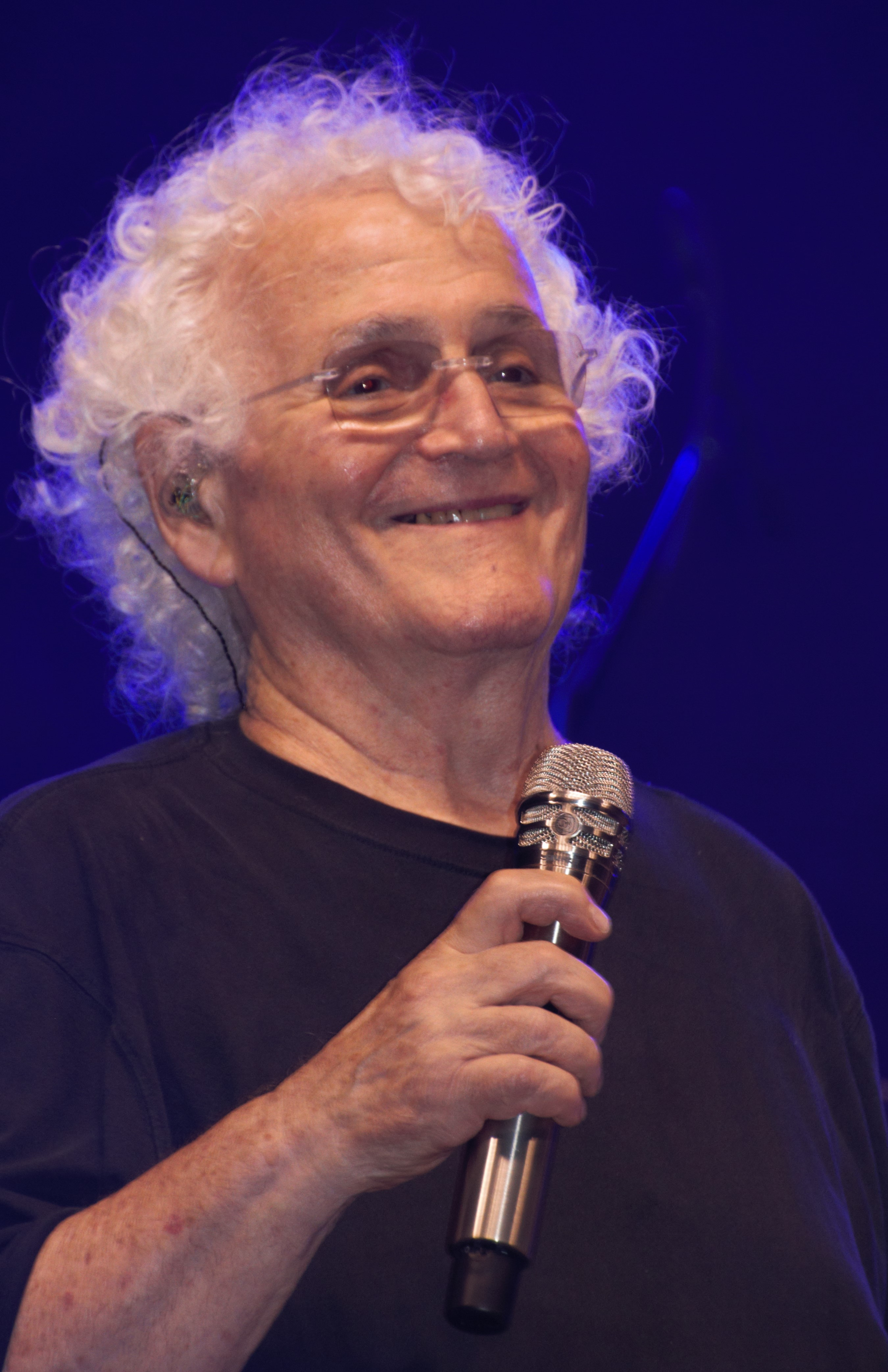
Freiberg in 2018

After a two-decade hiatus, Freiberg rejoined Kantner in the revived Jefferson Starship for their 2005 tour, mending a rift stemming from Freiberg's initial refusal to leave Jefferson Starship with Kantner in 1984. The tour was billed as "The Jefferson Family Galactic Reunion". According to Freiberg, Kantner had been "absolutely right" in leaving Jefferson Starship in the 1980s, and he "apologized." He became a permanent member of the reformed band. He appeared on the 2008 album Jefferson's Tree of Liberty. Freiburg performed vocals and guitar upon his return to the group.

Freiberg held his first solo show in 2007 on November 24 in the lounge of the Ledson Hotel on the Sonoma Plaza. He performed a number of songs not played live before. In 2007, he was still performing in Quicksilver, and he toured alongside Paul Kantner in the then-current Jefferson Starship.

In April 2017, the current members of Jefferson Starship were sued by former lead guitarist Craig Chaquico for not retiring the band's name in the aftermath of Kantner's death. According to Chaquico, the band had previously agreed to retire the moniker in a 1985 settlement. On December 4, 2018, the lawsuit concerning the use of the name Jefferson Starship was dismissed after an undisclosed settlement was reached between Chaquico and the current members of the band.

The band was still touring in July 2018, with Freiberg singing lead on tracks such as "We Built This City". In November 2018, Freiberg collaborated with the Dayton Symphony. Freiberg turned 8o years old in August 2018 while still actively touring with the group.

== Personal life ==
In 1966, Freiberg married Julia "Girl Freiberg" Brigden; they had a daughter, Jessica. Following their divorce in 1979, Freiberg was remarried to singer Linda Imperial in 1990.

Around 1968, he moved into a house in Novato that had previously been rented by Bob Weir and Ron McKernan. He and his family reside in the same house, where he has built a recording studio and practices Soka Gakkai Buddhism.

Rolling Stone has described him as "Starship's most outwardly easygoing member."

== Discography ==
=== Quicksilver Messenger Service ===
- Quicksilver Messenger Service (1968)
- Happy Trails (1969)
- Shady Grove (1969)
- Just For Love (1970)
- What About Me (1970)
- Solid Silver (1975)

=== Jefferson Airplane/Jefferson Starship/Paul Kantner/Grace Slick ===
- Blows Against the Empire (Paul Kantner & Jefferson Starship) (1970)
- Thirty Seconds Over Winterland (Jefferson Airplane) (1973)
- Baron von Tollbooth & the Chrome Nun (Paul Kantner, Grace Slick and David Freiberg) (1973)
- Manhole (Grace Slick) (1974)
- Dragon Fly (1974)
- Red Octopus (1975)
- Spitfire (1976)
- Earth (1978)
- Freedom at Point Zero (1979)
- Modern Times (1981)
- Winds of Change (1982)
- Planet Earth Rock and Roll Orchestra (Paul Kantner) (1983)
- Nuclear Furniture (1984)
- Jefferson's Tree of Liberty (2008)
- Mother of the Sun (2020)

=== Other ===
| Year | Collaborator | Album | Comment |
|---|---|---|---|
| 1971 | David Crosby | If I Could Only Remember My Name | |
| 1972 | Mickey Hart | Rolling Thunder | |
| 1973 | Jack Traylor & Steelwind | Child of Nature | |
| 1974 | Robert Hunter | Tales of the Great Rum Runners | |
| 1975 | Robert Hunter | Tiger Rose | |
| 1975 | Ned Lagin | Seastones | |
| 1976 | Mickey Hart | Diga | |
