= John Cipollina =

American guitarist (1943–1989)

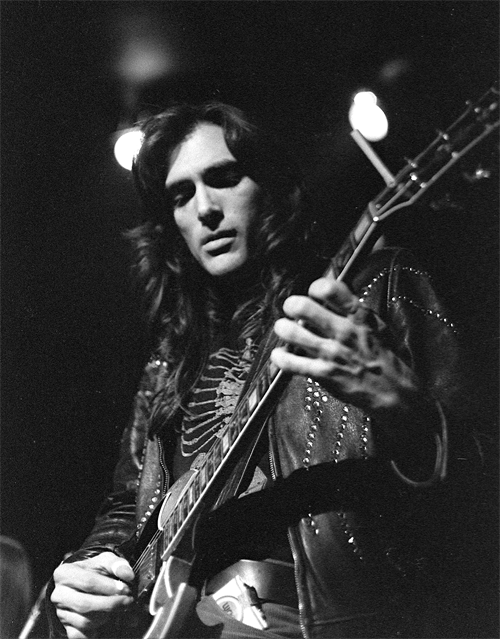
- Cipollina performing with Copperhead at Keystone Berkeley in 1976

Background information
- Born: August 24, 1943; Berkeley, California, U.S.
- Died: May 29, 1989 (aged 45) San Francisco, California, U.S.
- Genres: Rock, psychedelic rock
- Occupation: Musician
- Instruments: Guitar; vocals
- Years active: 1964–1989
- Labels: Capitol, Line Records, Music Box Records
- Website: JohnCipollina.com

John Cipollina (/ˌtʃɪpəˈliːnə/; August 24, 1943 – May 29, 1989) was a guitarist best known for his role as a founder and the lead guitarist of the prominent San Francisco rock band Quicksilver Messenger Service. After leaving Quicksilver he formed the band Copperhead, was a member of the San Francisco All Stars and later played with numerous other bands.

== Early years ==
John and his twin sister Manuela were born in Berkeley, California, on August 24, 1943. Cipollina attended Tamalpais High School in Mill Valley, California, as did his brother Mario (born 1954) and sister Antonia (born 1952). Their father Gino, a realtor, was of Italian ancestry (Genoese origins). Their mother Evelyn and godfather José Iturbi were concert pianists.

John showed great promise as a classical pianist in his youth, but his father gave him a guitar when he was 12 and this quickly became his primary instrument.

== Equipment and technique ==
Cipollina had a unique guitar sound, mixing solid state and vacuum-tube (valve) amplifiers as early as 1965. He is considered one of the fathers of the San Francisco sound, a form of psychedelic rock.

I like the rapid punch of solid-state for the bottom, and the rodent-gnawing distortion of the tubes on top.

To create his distinctive guitar sound, Cipollina developed a one-of-a-kind amplifier stack. His Gibson SG guitars had two pickups, one for bass and one for treble. The bass pickup fed into two Standel bass amps on the bottom of the stack, each equipped with two 15-inch speakers. The treble pickups fed two Fender amps: a Fender Twin Reverb and a Fender Dual Showman that drove six Wurlitzer horns.

He has been referred to as the "archetypal psychedelic player" who originally was a classical guitarist who became a folksinger and switched to electric guitar after the British Invasion. An example of his technique was displayed in the live version of the Bo Diddley song "Who Do You Love" which spanned the entire first side of the 1969 album Happy Trails where he "whips out nearly every technique and effect known to rock guitarists at the time, including heavy distortion, feedback, tremolo, echo, and slide effects" with "jazz influences, whammy vibratos, and string-bending techniques." In conjunction with second guitarist Gary Duncan who provided chords and wah effect accompaniment as noted on the song "Calvary" where Cipollina laid the groundwork for the future "textbook of psychedelic guitar" with "harmonic runs, distorted blues licks, and feedback effects."

== Copperhead and career after Quicksilver Messenger Service ==
After leaving Quicksilver in 1971, Cipollina formed the band Copperhead with early Quicksilver member Jim Murray (who soon decamped for Maui, Hawaii), former Stained Glass member Jim McPherson, drummer David Weber, Gary Phillipet (a.k.a. Gary Phillips (keyboardist), later a member of Bay Area bands Earthquake and The Greg Kihn Band), and Pete Sears. (Sears was eventually replaced by current and longtime Bonnie Raitt bassist James "Hutch" Hutchinson after Sears left the band to record on piano with early Rod Stewart and play bass with Nicky Hopkins. Hutch played on Copperhead’s first official LP and stayed with the band for its duration).

Copperhead disbanded in mid 1974 after becoming a staple in the SF Bay Area and touring the West Coast, Hawaii (Sunshine Crater Fest on New Years Day of 1973 with Santana), the South (opening dates for Steely Dan) and the Midwest (opening dates for Focus as well once again for Steely Dan).

In May 1974, Cipollina and Link Wray, whose playing and style had influenced John as a young musician and who he had met through bassist Hutch Hutchinson, performed a series of shows together along the West Coast (with Copperhead rhythm section Hutchinson & Weber and keyboardist David Bloom) culminating at The Whiskey in LA where they performed for four nights (May 15–19) on a bill with Lighthouse. Cipollina continued to occasionally perform with Wray for the next couple of years.

During the 1980s, Cipollina performed with a number of bands, including Fish & Chips, Thunder and Lightning, the Dinosaurs and Problem Child. He was a founding member of Zero and its rhythm guitarist until his death. Most often these bands played club gigs in the San Francisco Bay Area, where Cipollina was well-known.

=== Guesting with Man ===
In 1975, the Welsh psychedelic band Man toured the United States, towards the end of which they played two gigs at Winterland in San Francisco (March 21 and 22), which were such a success that promoter Bill Graham paid them a bonus and rebooked them. While waiting for the additional gigs, the band met and rehearsed with Cipollina, who played with them at Winterland in April 1975. After this, Cipollina agreed to play a UK tour which took place in May 1975, during which their Chalk Farm Roundhouse gig was recorded.

Rumors that Micky Jones had to overdub Cipollina's parts, as his guitar was out of tune, before their Maximum Darkness album could be released are exaggerated; only one track, "Bananas", was to have his track replaced, per Deke Leonard. "Everything ... which sounds like Cipollina is Cipollina."

The album eventually reached #25 in the UK album charts.

== Death and legacy ==
Cipollina died on May 29, 1989 at age 45. His cause of death was alpha-1 antitrypsin deficiency, which he suffered from most of his life and which is exacerbated by smoking.

Quicksilver Messenger Service fans paid tribute to him the following month in San Francisco at an all-star concert at the Fillmore Auditorium which featured Nicky Hopkins, Pete Sears, David Freiberg, and John's brother Mario, an original member of Huey Lewis and the News(their 1991 album Hard at Play is dedicated to John's memory). Cipollina's one-of-a-kind massive amplifier stack was donated, along with one of his customized Gibson SG guitars, and effects pedals, for display in the Rock and Roll Hall of Fame and Museum in 1995.

In 2003, Rolling Stone Magazine ranked Cipollina 32nd on their list of the 100 greatest guitarists of all time.

== Discography ==
=== Quicksilver Messenger Service ===
- 1968: Quicksilver Messenger Service
- 1969: Happy Trails
- 1969: Shady Grove
- 1970: Just for Love
- 1970: What About Me
- 1975: Solid Silver

=== with Brewer and Shipley ===
- 1971: Shake off the Demon (Kama Sutra)

=== with Papa John Creach ===
- 1971: Papa John Creach (Grunt Records)

=== with Mickey Hart ===
- 1972: Rolling Thunder

=== Copperhead ===
- 1973: Copperhead (Columbia)

=== with Man ===
- 1975: Maximum Darkness

Maximum Darkness LP (1975) United Artists: CD (1991) BGO CD 43: CD Re-mix (2008) Esoteric ECLEC 2061 Micky Jones, Deke Leonard, Martin Ace, Terry Williams, John Cipollina Recorded at The Roundhouse, Chalk Farm, 26 May 1975

=== Freelight ===
- 1977: unreleased demos

=== Terry and the Pirates ===
- 1979 Too Close For Comfort (Wild Bunch)
- 1980 Doubtful Handshake (Line Records)
- 1981 Wind Dancer (Rag Baby, Line Records)
- 1982 Rising of the Moon (Rag Baby, Line Records)
- 1987 Acoustic Rangers (Sawdust Records)
- 1990 Silverado Trail (Big Beat Records)

=== Solo album ===
- 1980: John Cipollina's Raven (Line Records)

re-released in 2006 as Raven (Acadia) with 7 additional tracks

Re-release Tracklist 1. Rock & Roll Nurse 2. True Golden Touch 3. Do What You Do 4. Unvicious Circle 5. True Reward 6. Grass Is Always Greener 7. Clouds 8. All Worth The price 9. Ride (Highway Song) 10. Burning Corte Madera 11. The Truth 12. Bad News 13. Razor Blade4 & Rattlesnake 14. Prayers

=== with Nick Gravenites ===
- 1980: Blue Star (Line Records)

=== The Nick Gravenites - John Cipollina Band ===
- 1982: Monkey Medicine (Line Records)
- 1991: Live at Rodon "Nick Gravenites and John Cipollina"; recorded 12/31/1987; (Music Box)

=== The Dinosaurs ===
- 1988: Dinosaurs

=== with Merrell Fankhauser ===
- 1986: Dr. Fankhauser

=== Zero ===
- 1987: Here Goes Nothin (Relix Records)
- 1990: Nothin Goes Here] (Mobile Fidelity Sound Lab)
- 1991: Go Hear Nothin (Live) (Whirled Records)

== Videos ==
- Quicksilver Messenger Service LIVE 1967 on YouTube Dino's Song
- Mona (1969) - Quicksilver Messenger Service on YouTube
- Who Do You Love - Cobra - Mona (1980) Cipollina-Graventies Band on YouTube
