= Quicksilver Messenger Service =

American psychedelic rock band formed in 1965

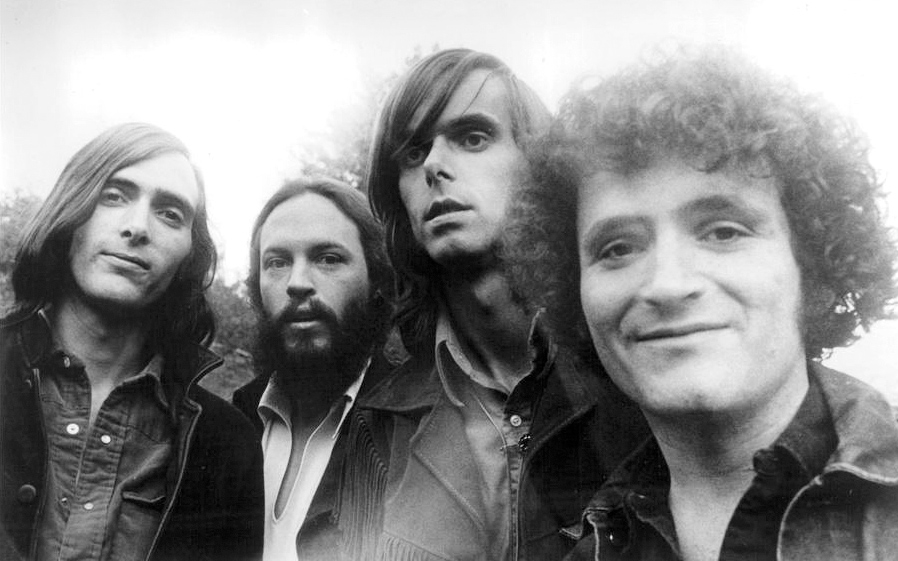
- Quicksilver Messenger Service, 1970; John Cipollina, Greg Elmore, Nicky Hopkins, David Freiberg

Background information
- Also known as: Quicksilver (1970–1975); Gary Duncan's Quicksilver (1986, 1996–2001); David Freiberg's Quicksilver Messenger Service (2009–2017)
- Origin: San Francisco, California, U.S.
- Genres: Psychedelic rock; acid rock; jam band; blues rock
- Years active: 1965–1979, 1986, 1996–2001, 2006–2017
- Labels: Cleopatra, Capitol, Edsel
- Spinoff of: The Brogues
- Past members: See below
- Website: dfquicksilver.com

Quicksilver Messenger Service was an American psychedelic rock band formed in 1965 in San Francisco. The band achieved wide popularity in the San Francisco Bay Area and, through their recordings, with psychedelic rock enthusiasts around the globe, and several of their albums ranked in the Top 30 of the Billboard Pop charts. They were part of the new wave of album-oriented bands, achieving renown and popularity despite a lack of success with their singles (only one, "Fresh Air" charted, reaching No. 49 in 1970). Though not as commercially successful as contemporaries Jefferson Airplane and the Grateful Dead, Quicksilver was integral to the beginnings of their genre. With their jazz and classical influences and a strong folk background, the band attempted to create an individual, innovative sound. Music historian Colin Larkin wrote: "Of all the bands that came out of the San Francisco area during the late '60s, Quicksilver typified most of the style, attitude and sound of that era."

The band's members included John Cipollina, Gary Duncan, Greg Elmore, David Freiberg, Nicky Hopkins, and Dino Valenti. Valenti drew heavily on musical influences he picked up during the folk revival of his formative musical years. The style he developed from these sources is evident in Quicksilver Messenger Service's swing rhythms and twanging guitar sounds. After many years, the band has attempted to re-form despite the deaths of several members. In 2006, Duncan and Freiberg toured as the Quicksilver Messenger Service, using various backing musicians.

== History ==
=== Formation ===
There is some confusion as to the real origins of the group. According to John Cipollina:

It was Valenti who organized the group. I can remember everything Dino said. "We were all going to have wireless guitars. We were going to have leather jackets made with hooks that we could hook these wireless instruments right into. And we were gonna have these chicks, backup rhythm sections that were gonna dress like American Indians with real short little dresses on and they were gonna have tambourines and the clappers in the tambourines were going to be silver coins." And I'm sitting there going, 'This guy is gonna happen and we're gonna set the world on its ear.'

The next day, Valenti was arrested for possession of marijuana and spent the better part of the next two years in jail. However, Gary Duncan has stated:

That's the story Cipollina told everybody. But according to Dino, that wasn't the case at all. When he'd been looking for a band, he'd talked to Cipollina, and everybody somehow put two and two together. He actually lived with us when he got out of prison, and while we played some music together and wrote songs, he had no interest in playing in Quicksilver; he wanted to start his own career. Well, when his own career didn't do so well, he had more interest in playing in Quicksilver!

Whether or not Quicksilver Messenger Service was what Valenti had in mind, it appears from Duncan's recollections that he had at least talked with Cipollina about forming a band; Cipollina remembered that:

I was recommended to Dino, probably because I was the only guy playing an electric guitar, let alone lead, at the time…We talked about rehearsing one night and planned to rehearse the following night but it never happened. The next day Dino got busted.

David Freiberg, a folk-guitarist friend of Valenti, was recruited to the group. He had previously been in a band with Paul Kantner and David Crosby but like Valenti he had been arrested and briefly jailed for marijuana possession and had just been released. "We were to take care of this guy Freiberg", Cipollina recalled, and though they had never met before, Freiberg was integrated into the group. The band also added Skip Spence on guitar and began to rehearse at Marty Balin's club, the Matrix. Balin, in search of a drummer for the band he was organizing (which became Jefferson Airplane), convinced Spence to switch instruments and groups.

To make up for poaching Spence, Balin suggested that they contact drummer Greg Elmore and guitarist–singer Gary Duncan, who had played together in a group called The Brogues. This new version of the group played its first concert performance in December 1965, playing for the Christmas party of the Committee (improv group). Drummer Greg Elmore and guitarist Jim Murray were added to fill out the original band.

It was a band without a name, Cipollina recalled:

Jim Murray and David Freiberg came up with the name. Me and Freiberg were born on the same day, and Gary and Greg were born on the same day, we were all Virgos and Murray was a Gemini. And Virgos and Geminis are all ruled by the planet Mercury. Another name for Mercury is Quicksilver. And then, Quicksilver is the messenger of the Gods, and Virgo is the servant, so Freiberg says "Oh, Quicksilver Messenger Service".

=== Management ===
The group's early management was by Ambrose Hollingworth, who became a paraplegic as a result of an automobile crash near Muir Beach, California in 1966. Hollingworth's stewardship, which also included the all-female Ace of Cups, transferred to Ron Polte. Polte was known for going to great lengths to accommodate the needs of his musicians. When perennial studio musician Nicky Hopkins joined the band in 1969, it was the first and only band that officially included him in its performing and recording revenues. Hollingsworth died in 1996, and Polte in 2016.

=== 1967–1969: Success ===
Jim Murray left the group not long after they performed at the Monterey International Pop Festival in June 1967. The band began a period of heavy touring on the West Coast of the United States where they built up a solid following and featured on many star-studded bills at the Avalon Ballroom and the Fillmore West. Sound system pioneer, inventor, and engineer (and famous LSD chemist) Owsley Stanley regularly recorded concerts at major San Francisco venues during this period, and his archive includes many Quicksilver Messenger Service live performances from 1966 and 1967, which were released on his Bear Recordings label in 2008 and 2009.

Quicksilver Messenger Service initially held back from committing to a record deal but eventually signed to Capitol Records in late 1967, becoming the last of the top-ranked San Francisco bands to join a major label. Capitol was the only company that had missed out on signing a San Francisco "hippie" band during the first flurry of record company interest and, consequently, Quicksilver Messenger Service was able to negotiate a better deal than many of their peers. At the same time, Capitol signed the Steve Miller Band, with whom Quicksilver Messenger Service had appeared on the movie and soundtrack album Revolution, together with the group Mother Earth.

Quicksilver Messenger Service released their self-titled debut album in 1968. It was followed by Happy Trails, released in early 1969 and largely recorded live at the Fillmore East and the Fillmore West. Like most live albums of the time, Happy Trails made extensive use of studio overdubs, and the last two songs were recorded entirely in the studio, but it has nonetheless been called the most accurate reproduction of the band's acclaimed live performances. Happy Trails was awarded a gold album in the United States.

These albums, which have been hailed as "...two of the best examples of the San Francisco sound at its purest," emphasize extended arrangements and fluid twin-guitar improvisation. Cipollina's highly melodic lead guitar style, combined with Gary Duncan's driving jazz-inspired guitar playing, distinguished the group from the relatively brash presentation of contemporaries such as Cream and Jimi Hendrix. In 2003 Happy Trails was rated at No. 189 in the Rolling Stone Top 500 albums survey, where it was described as "...the definitive live recording of the mid-Sixties San Francisco psychedelic-ballroom experience..."

Duncan left the group not long after the recording of Happy Trails; according to David Freiberg, this was largely because of his escalating problems with opiates and amphetamines. His 'farewell' performances were the studio recordings that ended up on Happy Trails and a final live performance with the band on New Year's Eve 1969. Duncan recalled 18 years later:

Well, let's put it this way, at the end of 1968, I was pretty burned out. We'd been on the road for, really, the first time in our lives. I just left for a year. I didn't want to have anything to do with music at all. And I left for a year and rode motorcycles and lived in New York and L.A. and just kind of went crazy for about a year.

Freiberg later recalled that Duncan's departure shook the core of the band: "Duncan was the 'engine' man, it just didn't WORK without him ... for me. I was really ... I was devastated..."

For their 1969 album Shady Grove, Duncan was replaced by renowned English session keyboardist Nicky Hopkins, who had played on successful projects by the likes of the Kinks, the Rolling Stones, and the Who, while Cipollina became the sole guitarist.

=== 1970–1971 ===
Following the release of Shady Grove, Duncan rejoined the group and Valenti had been released from prison, expanding the group to a six-piece. Just for Love, the group's next album, was recorded in Hawaii. The band's approach to recording was undisciplined, with Valenti renting a building without electricity to record in. The finished albums took many hours in the studio because the group had a contract which allowed unlimited studio time with no Capitol producer present unless invited. The producer was only invited to the studio to hear the playing of the finished recordings.

The follow-up album, What About Me, also featured material recorded in Hawaii, though it was mainly tracked at Pacific High Recording in San Francisco, where both albums were mixed. The albums steered away from the acid rock that characterized the group's early releases, with Valenti taking over as lead singer and, under the pseudonym of Jesse Oris Farrow, principal songwriter. In spite of this, Just For Love featured the successful single "Fresh Air".

Hopkins apparently left during the Hawaii recording sessions, as founding Paul Butterfield Blues Band keyboardist Mark Naftalin takes his place for three cuts on What About Me, while Cipollina departed after the band returned.

=== 1971–1979 ===
The band continued with the lineup of Freiberg, Duncan, Elmore, Valenti, and Naftalin until September 1971, when Freiberg was jailed for marijuana possession; he was replaced by Mark Ryan. This lineup recorded two commercially unsuccessful albums, Quicksilver (1971; No. 114) and Comin' Thru (1972; No. 134), that left the group without a recording contract. Duncan's "Doin' Time in the USA" from the latter album enjoyed a modicum of FM radio play at the time, while the Quicksilver track "Fire Brothers" was later covered by 4AD founder Ivo Watts-Russell's This Mortal Coil on Filigree and Shadow (1986).

Now largely a part-time vehicle for Valenti and Duncan, the group continued to tour sporadically over the next two years, playing a mixture of headlining club dates and arena/stadium support slots for more popular groups such as The James Gang. Naftalin departed the band in 1972 and was replaced by Charlie Schoning, nicknamed Chuck Steaks. Harold Aceves, formerly a roadie for the band, also joined the band at the same time as a second drummer. Ryan was fired in 1972 after missing a flight; he was replaced by Roger Stanton. Stanton had played with Aceves in a popular Phoenix, Arizona band Poland. Stanton remained with the band until 1974 when he was replaced by Bob Flurie, who was renowned in the eastern part of the US as a virtuoso guitar player. This Quicksilver lineup disbanded in 1975. Aceves, Stanton, and Flurie later backed former Country Joe and the Fish guitarist Barry Melton.

In 1975, Elmore, Duncan, Valenti, Freiberg and Cipollina recorded a reunion album, Solid Silver, on Capitol Records. The album also included contributions from a variety of Bay Area musicians, including former keyboardist Nicky Hopkins, session vocalist Kathi McDonald and Jefferson Starship multi-instrumentalist Pete Sears. Released in November 1975, Solid Silver fared better from a commercial and critical standpoint than the preceding two albums but only managed to peak at No. 89. While Freiberg elected not to rejoin the live group as a result of his Jefferson Starship commitments, Cipollina, keyboardist Michael Lewis and bassist Skip Olsen toured with the returning trio for a handful of concerts in 1975, culminating in an appearance at San Francisco's Winterland Ballroom on December 28. Shortly thereafter, Cipollina departed once again and the remaining quintet continued to tour clubs intermittently until finally dissolving in 1979.

Unable to secure a major label contract in the aftermath of the 1975 Quicksilver reunion, Cipollina continued to perform regularly with other Bay Area acts, including Thunder and Lightning, co-led with Nick Gravenites (who had co-produced Quicksilver's debut) and featuring Quicksilver drummer Greg Elmore. Cipollina also formed Fish and Chips with Barry Melton, and became a founding member of Dinosaurs in 1982. Some of Cipollina's QMS equipment is displayed at the Rock and Roll Hall of Fame.

=== 1986–2017: Reunion activity ===
Gary Duncan resurrected the brand as Gary Duncan's Quicksilver in the mid 1980s and released several albums with a reconstituted lineup. Peace By Piece was released 1986, followed by nearly a decade of inactivity. Duncan resumed work in the mid 1990s, forming a live band and releasing the studio albums Shapeshifter Vols. 1 & 2 (1996), Three in the Side (1998), Shapeshifter Vols. 3 & 4 and Strange Trim (2006), and Six String Voodoo (2008). He also issued several live albums and created a website, quicksilvermessengerservice.com. Duncan's band toured with a lineup of himself, Michael Lewis (keyboards), Greg Errico (drums), Bobby Vega (bass), John Bird (guitar), and Tony Menjivar (percussion). The band came to a halt in 2001 due to the September 11 attacks, which heavily affected air travel and thus touring. By this time, only Duncan, Lewis, Vega, and Errico remained.

In 2006 Gary Duncan and David Freiberg launched a 40th-anniversary Quicksilver celebration tour as Quicksilver Messenger Service, with Bobby Vega (soon to be replaced by Keith Graves on bass), singer Linda Imperial (Freiberg's wife and contributor to Quicksilver projects before as a backup singer) and Jefferson Starship players Prairie Prince (drums) and Chris Smith (keyboards). Following a series of tours, Duncan left the band in 2009. He was replaced by Peter Harris, and the band continued as David Freiberg's Quicksilver Messenger Service.

Freiberg's group often opened for the reconstituted Jefferson Starship (led by Freiberg and Paul Kantner) until Kantner's death in 2016. In 2017, Quicksilver Messenger Service ceased performing with no formal announcement. Duncan died aged 72 on June 29, 2019, in Woodland, California after suffering a seizure and falling into a coma.

Quicksilver Gold, a tribute band, formed in 2002. Members included Dino Valenti's son, Joli Valenti, as well as John Cipollina's brother, Mario Cipollina, and some members of Zero. This band broke up in 2004.

== Band members ==
- Greg Elmore – drums (1965–1979; died 2026)
- David Freiberg – lead and backing vocals, bass, rhythm guitar (1965–1971, 1975, 2006–2017)
- John Cipollina – guitar, backing vocals (1965–1971, 1975; died 1989)
- Gary Duncan – lead and backing vocals, guitar, bass (1965–1969, 1969–1979, 1986, 1996–2001, 2006–2009; died 2019)
- Jim Murray – guitar, backing and lead vocals (1965–1967; died 2013)
- Nicky Hopkins – keyboards (1969–1971; died 1994)
- Dino Valenti – lead and backing vocals, rhythm guitar (1969–1979; died 1994)
- Mark Naftalin – keyboards (1971–1972)
- Mark Ryan – bass (1971–1972)
- Harold Aceves – drums (1972–1975; died 2012)
- Charlie "Chuck Steaks" Schoning – keyboards (1972–1975; died 2001)
- Roger Stanton – bass (1972–1974)
- Bob Flurie – bass (1974–1975)
- W. Michael Lewis – keyboards (1975–1979, 1986, 1996–2001)
- Skip Olsen – bass (1975–1979)
- Sammy Piazza − drums (1986)
- Bobby Vega − bass (1996–2001, 2006–2007)
- Greg Errico − drums (1996–2001)
- John Bird − guitar (1996–1998; died 2003)
- Tony Menjivar – percussion (1996–1998; died 2021)
- Chris Smith − keyboards (2006–2017)
- Linda Imperial − backing and lead vocals (2006–2017)
- Prairie Prince − drums (2006–2008)
- Keith Graves − bass (2007–2015)
- Donny Baldwin − drums (2008–2017)
- Peter Harris − guitar, backing and lead vocals (2009–2017)
- Jude Gold − guitar, backing vocals (2012–2017)
- Steve Valverde − bass (2015–2017)

== Discography ==
=== Studio albums ===
- Quicksilver Messenger Service (1968)
- Happy Trails (1969)
- Shady Grove (1969; as Quicksilver)
- Just for Love (1970; as Quicksilver)
- What About Me (1970; as Quicksilver)
- Quicksilver (1971; as Quicksilver)
- Comin' Thru (1972; as Quicksilver)
- Solid Silver (1975)

=== "Gary Duncan's Quicksilver" studio and live albums ===
- Peace by Piece (1986)
- Shape Shifter Vols. 1 & 2 (1996)
- Three in the Side (1998)
- Shapeshifter Vols. 3 & 4 (2006)
- Strange Trim (2006) – studio/live
- Six String Voodoo (2008)

Live:

- Live at Fieldstone (1997)
- Live at the 7th Note (2007)
- Live 07 (2008)

=== Archival live albums ===
- Maiden of the Cancer Moon (recorded 1968, released 1983)
- At the Kabuki Theatre (recorded 1970, released 2007)
- Live at the Avalon Ballroom, San Francisco, 9th September 1966 (recorded 1966, released 2008)
- Live at the Avalon Ballroom, San Francisco, 28th October 1966 (recorded 1966, released 2008)
- Live at The Fillmore, San Francisco, 4th February 1967 (recorded 1967, released 2008)
- Live at The Fillmore, San Francisco, 6th February 1967 (recorded 1967, released 2008)
- Live at The Carousel Ballroom, San Francisco, 4th April 1968 (recorded 1968, released 2008)
- Live at the Quarter Note Lounge, New Orleans, LA, July 1977 (recorded 1977, released 2009)
- Live at the Fillmore, June 7, 1968 (recorded 1968, released 2013)
- Live at The Old Mill Tavern – March 29, 1970 (recorded 1970, released 2013)
- Live at the Winterland Ballroom, December 1, 1973 (recorded 1973, released 2013)
- Fillmore Auditorium – November 5, 1966 (recorded 1966, released 2014)
- Smokin' Sound (recorded 1968, released 2015)
- Cowboy On The Run – Live In New York (recorded 1976, released 2015)
- Live in San Jose – September 1966 (recorded 1966, released 2015)
- Fillmore Auditorium – February 5, 1967 Live (recorded 1967, released 2015)
- Stony Brook College, New York 1970 Live (recorded 1970, released 2015)
- Live Across America 1967–1977 (recorded 1967–1977, released 2016)
- More Happy Trails 1969 – Live (recorded 1969, released 2016)

=== Compilation albums ===
- Revolution (movie soundtrack) (1968) with Steve Miller Band and Mother Earth
- Quicksilver Anthology (1973)
- Sons of Mercury 1968–75 (1991)
- Unreleased Quicksilver Messenger Service - Lost Gold and Silver (previously unreleased recordings) (1999)
- Classic Masters (2002)
- Castles in the Sand (previously unreleased studio jams 1969–1970) (2009)
- Who Do You Love? The Recordings 1967-1972 (2026)

=== Singles ===
- 1968 – "Dino's Song"/"Pride of Man"
- 1968 – "Stand By Me" (No. 110)
- 1969 – "Holy Moly"
- 1969 – "Who Do You Love" (No. 91)
- 1969 – "Shady Grove"
- 1970 – "Fresh Air" (No. 49)
- 1971 – "What About Me" (No. 100)
- 1971 – "I Found Love"
- 1972 – "Changes"
- 1975 – "Gypsy Lights"
