= Greg Elmore =

American drummer (1946–2026)

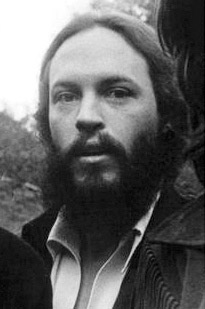
- Elmore in 1970

Background information
- Born: Gregory Dale Elmore; September 4, 1946; Coronado, California, U.S.
- Died: March 29, 2026 (aged 79)
- Genres: Rock
- Occupation: Drummer
- Years active: 1964–1979
- Formerly of: Quicksilver Messenger Service, The Brogues

Gregory Dale Elmore (September 4, 1946 – March 29, 2026) was an American drummer, who was a member of The Brogues and the San Francisco rock band Quicksilver Messenger Service.

== Life and career ==
Elmore was born at Naval Air Station North Island in Coronado, California, on September 4, 1946. He also played regularly with Terry and the Pirates from 1981 to 1989.

He died on March 29, 2026, aged 79.
