= Byrd (surname) =

English surname

Byrd is a surname of English and Irish origin, a variant of the surname Bird.

== Notable people with the surname ==
- A. Dean Byrd (1948–2012), American psychologist
- Adam M. Byrd (1859–1912), American politician
- Adrianne Byrd (1970–2020), American romance novelist
- Albert Byrd (1915–1990), American cyclist
- Alma W. Byrd (1924–2017), American politician
- Alton Byrd (born 1957), American-British basketball player, sports broadcaster and sports executive
- Andrew Byrd (born 1982), American politician
- Bill Byrd (1907–1991), American baseball player
- Billy Byrd (1920–2001), American country guitarist
- Bobby Byrd (1934–2007), American R&B and soul singer, songwriter, and musician
- Boris Byrd (born 1962), American football player
- Brandon R. Byrd, American historian
- Bretton Byrd (1904–1959), British composer and musician
- Brigitte Byrd (born 1959), French-American poet
- Butch Byrd (born 1941), AFL Hall of Fame
- Charles Byrd (fighter) (born 1983), American mixed martial artist
- Charles Pinckney Byrd (c. 1857–1935), American publisher and printer
- Charles Willing Byrd (1770–1828), first sitting justice on the United States District Court of Ohio
- Charlice Byrd (born 1951), American politician
- Charlie Byrd (1925–1999), American jazz guitarist
- Chris Byrd (born 1970), American heavyweight boxing champion
- Conley Byrd (1925–2014), Justice of the Arkansas Supreme Court
- Cord Byrd (born 1971), American attorney and politician
- Curley Byrd (1889–1970), American university administrator, educator, athlete, coach, and politician
- Damiere Byrd (born 1993), American football player
- Dan Byrd (born 1985), American actor
- Danny Byrd (born 1979), English DJ, record producer and musician
- Darryl Byrd (born 1960), American football player
- David Byrd (politician) (born 1957), American politician and retired basketball coach
- David Edward Byrd (1941–2025), American graphic designer and painter
- David Harold Byrd (1900–1986), American petroleum geologist and businessman
- Debra Byrd (1951–2024), American vocalist
- Deborah Byrd (born 1951), American science journalist
- Dennis Byrd (1966–2016), American football player
- Dennis Byrd (American football, born 1946) (1946–2010), American football player
- Demetrius Byrd (born 1986), American football player
- Dominique Byrd (born 1984), American football player
- Don Byrd, American poet
- Donald Byrd (1932–2013), American jazz trumpeter
- Donald Byrd (choreographer) (born 1949), American dance choreographer
- Dontez Byrd (born 1995), American football player
- Elizabeth Byrd (1912–1989), American author
- Emanuel Byrd (born 1994), American football player
- Eugene Byrd (born 1975), American actor
- Flossie M. Byrd (1927–2020), American home economist
- Garland T. Byrd (1924–1997), American politician
- Geoff Byrd (born 1970), American musician
- George Byrd (1926–2010), American conductor
- Gibson Byrd (1923–2002), American painter
- Gill Byrd (born 1961), American football player
- Harriet Elizabeth Byrd (1926–2015), American politician and educator
- Harry Byrd (baseball) (1925–1985), American baseball player
- Harry F. Byrd (1887–1966), U.S. senator for Virginia
- Harry F. Byrd Jr. (1914–2013), U.S. senator for Virginia from 1965 until 1983
- Henry Roeland Byrd (1918–1980), American blues musician
- Imhotep Gary Byrd, American radio host and musician
- Isaac Byrd (born 1974), American football player
- Israel Byrd (born 1971), American college football player and coach
- Jairus Byrd (born 1986), American football player
- James Byrd Jr. (1949–1998), American murder victim
- James W. Byrd (born 1954), American politician
- Jazz Byrd (c. 1904–1994), American football player and coach and tax collector
- Jefferson Byrd (born 1971), American politician
- Jeff Byrd (born 1956), American baseball player
- Jeffrey J. Byrd, American biologist
- Jeffrey W. Byrd, American film director, producer and screenwriter
- Jerry Byrd (1920–2005), American lap steel guitarist
- Jessica Byrd, American feminist activist
- Jim Byrd (born 1968), American baseball player
- Jodi Byrd, Chickasaw academic
- Joe Byrd (vaudeville), American vaudeville comedian
- Joe Byrd (Cherokee Nation Principal Chief) (born 1954)
- John William Byrd Jr. (1963–2002), American murderer
- Johnnie Byrd (born 1951), American politician
- Joseph Byrd (born 1937), American rock musician
- Joseph Tali Byrd, Cherokee/Quapaw Nation politician
- Josephine Byrd, American activist and former social service worker
- Jonathan Byrd (golfer) (born 1978), American golfer
- Jonathan Byrd (musician) (born 1970), American folk singer-songwriter
- Jordan Byrd (born 2000), American football player
- Kahlil Byrd, American political advisor and entrepreneur
- LaRon Byrd (born 1989), American football player
- Larry Byrd (born 1948), American politician
- Laurie Byrd, American basketball player and coach
- Leland Byrd (1927–2022), American college athletic administrator, basketball player and coach
- Leo Byrd (1936–1991), American basketball player
- Leonard Byrd (born 1975), American sprinter
- Louis Byrd, mayor of Lynwood, California
- Mabel Byrd (1895–1988), American civil rights activist
- Manford Byrd Jr. (1928–2021), American educator and education administrator
- Marc Byrd (born 1970), American musician, writer, and producer
- Maria Taylor Byrd (1698–1771), wife of William Byrd II
- Marlon Byrd (born 1977), American baseball player
- Mary E. Byrd (1849–1934), American educator
- Mary Willing Byrd (1740–1814), second wife of Colonel William Byrd III
- Maurice Oscar Byrd (1954–1991), American convicted mass shooter
- Melvin Byrd (born 1958), American football player
- Michael Byrd, American police officer
- Mitch Byrd (born 1961), American comic book artist
- Ollie Byrd (1896–1929), American baseball player
- Paul Byrd (born 1970), American baseball player
- Petri Hawkins-Byrd (born 1957), bailiff "Byrd" on the Judge Judy TV series
- Ralph Byrd (1909–1952), American actor
- Raymond Byrd (1895–1926), American lynching victim
- Richard Byrd (athlete) (1892–1958), American athlete and baseball player
- Richard Byrd (American football) (born 1962), American football player
- Richard C. Byrd (c. 1805–1854), American politician
- Richard Evelyn Byrd Sr. (1860–1925), Virginia lawyer, politician and newspaperman
- Richard E. Byrd (1888–1957), American admiral, polar explorer, aviator
- Richard Evelyn Byrd III (1920–1988), American naval officer and polar explorer
- Rick Byrd (born 1953), American college basketball coach
- Ricky Byrd (born 1956), American rock musician
- Robert Byrd (1917–2010), U.S. Senator, Democrat from West Virginia
- Robert Byrd (architect) (1904–1978), American architect
- Robert Byrd (artist) (born 1942), American author and illustrator
- Robert K. Byrd (1823–1885), American soldier and politician
- Robert L. Byrd, American politician and lobbyist
- Robin Byrd (born 1957), American former pornographic actress
- Russell Byrd (born 1992), American baseball player
- Sammy Byrd (1910–1981), American baseball player and golfer
- Solomon Byrd (born 1999), American football player
- Steve Byrd (1955–2016), English rock musician
- Sylvester Byrd (born 1963), American football player
- Terrill Byrd (born 1986), American football player
- Thomas Jefferson Byrd (1950–2020), American actor
- Tom Byrd (born 1960), American actor
- Tracy Byrd (boxer) (born 1964), American boxer
- Tracy Byrd (born 1966), American country singer
- Walt Byrd (born 1942), American retired basketball player
- Warren Byrd (born 1965), American jazz pianist, vocalist and composer
- Wendell Byrd, American politician and businessman
- William Byrd (1540–1623), English composer
- William Byrd I (1652–1704), member of colonial Virginia's House of Burgesses
- William Byrd II (1674–1744), founder of Richmond, Virginia
- William Byrd III (1728–1777), member of the House of Burgesses, and military officer
- William Byrd (died 1922), American lynching victim
- William M. Byrd (1819–1874), justice of the Supreme Court of Alabama
- Willie Byrd (born 1983), American football player
- Winifred Byrd (1884–1970), American concert pianist

== See also ==
- Byrd (disambiguation)
- Bird (disambiguation)
- Robert J. W. Byrde (1922–2010), English mycologist and phytopathologist
- The dictionary definition of byrde at Wiktionary
