= Bird (surname) =

Bird is an English surname, probably deriving from the vertebrates of the same name. Another common variant of this surname is "Byrd."

== A–I ==
- Aaron Bird (born 1983), Australian cricketer
- Alan Bird (1906–1962), Australian politician
- Alan C. Bird (born 1938), British ophthalmologist
- Albert Bird (1867–1927), English cricketer
- Alfred Bird (1811–1878), British food manufacturer and chemist
- Sir Alfred Bird, 1st Baronet (1849–1922), British, chemist, food manufacturer, and politician
- Alice Bird, British actress
- Andrew Bird (born 1973), American musician, songwriter, and multi-instrumentalist
- Andrew Bird (film editor) (born 1956), British film editor
- Antonia Bird (1951–2013), British director
- Anthony Bird (1931–2016), British Anglican priest, physician, and principal
- Arthur H. Bird (1856–1923), American composer
- Augustus A. Bird (1802–1870), American politician
- Barbara Bird, American organizational behavior academic
- Bill Bird (1888–1963), American journalist
- Billie Bird (1908–2002), American actress and comedian
- Bob Bird (editor), Scottish newspaper editor
- Bob Bird (politician) (born 1951), political activist and teacher
- Bobby Bird, British musician
- Brad Bird (born 1957), American director and writer
- Bud Bird (born 1932), Canadian politician
- Calvin Bird (1938–2013), American football player
- Carmel Bird (born 1940), Australian writer
- Charlie Bird (1949–2024), Irish journalist
- Christopher Bird (1928–1996), American journalist
- Claire B. Bird (1868–1954), American politician
- Corey Bird (born 1995), American baseball player
- Cuthbert Hilton Golding-Bird (1848–1939), British surgeon, son of Golding Bird
- Cyril Handley Bird (1896–1969), British civil servant
- D. Woodrow Bird (1912–1995), American politician from Virginia
- Daniel W. Bird Jr. (born 1938), American politician from Virginia
- David Bird (journalist) (c. 1959–2014), American journalist
- David Bird (bridge writer) (born 1946), British writer on Bridge
- Derrick Bird (1957–2010), English spree killer
- Dickie Bird (1933–2025), English cricket umpire
- Dillard E. Bird (1906–1990), American industrial and consulting engineer
- Don Bird (1908–1987), English football player
- Doreen Bird (1928–2004), British dance instructor and dance school founder
- Doug Bird (1950–2024), American baseball pitcher
- Edward Bird (1772–1819), English painter
- Edward Wheler Bird (1823–1903), founder of the British-Israelite Movement
- S. Elizabeth Bird, British-American anthropologist
- Ellen Bird (1881–1949), British-American Titanic survivor
- Eugene K. Bird (1926–2005), American military officer
- Florence Bird (1908–1998), Canadian journalist and politician
- Forrest Bird (1921–2015), American physician and inventor
- Frederic Mayer Bird (1838–1908), American educator and clergyman
- George Bird (baseball) (1850–1940), American baseball outfielder
- Gillian Bird (born 1957), Australian diplomat
- Golding Bird (1814–1854), British doctor
- Greg Bird (baseball) (born 1992), American baseball infielder
- Greg Bird (rugby league) (born 1984), Australian rugby league player
- Harlan P. Bird (1838–1912), American politician
- Harley Bird (born 2001), British voice actress
- Helen Louisa Bostwick Bird (1826–1907), American author, poet
- Henry Edward Bird (1830–1908), English chess player and writer
- Ian Bird (field hockey) (born 1970), Canadian ice hockey player
- Ian Bird (software developer), game designer
- Ira W. Bird (1819–1899), American politician
- Isabella Bird (1831–1904), English writer and historian
- Ivor Bird (1944–2024), Antiguan high jumper and broadcasting executive

== J–Z ==
- Jackie Bird (born 1962), Scottish broadcaster
- Jade Bird (born 1997), English musician
- Jake Bird (1901–1949), American serial killer and burglar
- Jake Bird (baseball) (born 1995), American baseball pitcher
- Jean Bird (1912–1957), British pilot
- John Bird (actor) (1936–2022), British actor and comedian
- John Bird (artist) (1766–1829), Welsh landscape artist
- John Bird (astronomer) (1709–1776), British astronomer and instrument designer
- John Bird (bishop) (died 1558), British Bishop of Chester
- John Bird (New York) (1768–1806), American politician
- John Bird (footballer) (born 1948), British football player and manager
- John Bird, Baron Bird (born 1946), founder of Big Issue
- John Taylor Bird (1829–1911), American politician
- Kai Bird (born 1951), American author
- Lara Bird (born 1998), Scottish politician
- Larry Bird (Canadian football) (born 1945), Canadian football player
- Larry Bird (born 1956), American basketball player
- Lester Bird (1938–2021), Antiguan athlete and politician
- Lloyd C. Bird (1894–1978), American politician
- Martina Topley-Bird (born 1975), British singer
- Michael J. Bird (1928–2001), British writer
- Morice Bird (1888–1933), British cricketer
- Nancy Bird Walton (1915–2009), Australian aviator
- Norman Bird (1920–2005), British actor
- Peter Bird (rower) (1947–1996), British ocean rower
- Richard Bird (actor) (1894–1986), British actor
- Richard Ely Bird (1878–1955), American politician
- Richard Bird (computer scientist) (1943–2022), professor at Oxford
- Robert Bird (Welsh politician) (1839–1909), Welsh politician
- Sir Robert Bird, 2nd Baronet (1876–1960), British politician
- Robert Byron Bird (1924–2020), American educator and chemical engineer
- Robert Montgomery Bird (1806–1854), American playwright, novelist, photographer, and physician
- Ronnie Bird (footballer) (1941–2005), English football player
- Rosa Bird, born Josephine Sarah Jacombs (1866–1927), Australian-English soprano
- Rosalyn Bird, Canadian politician
- Rose Bird (1936–1999), Chief Justice of California
- Ruth Bird (1899–1987), English historian and schoolteacher
- Sam Bird (born 1987), British racing driver
- Sharon Bird (born 1962), Australian politician
- Simon Bird (born 1984), British actor
- Sue Bird (born 1980), American basketball player
- Sue Bird (engineer), British acoustical engineer
- Tony Bird (singer-songwriter) (1945–2019), South African singer and songwriter
- Tony Bird (footballer born 1974), Welsh football player
- Towa Bird (born 1999), British singer-songwriter
- Vere Bird (1910–1999), prime minister of Antigua and Barbuda
- Víctor Bird (born 1982), Puerto Rican volleyball player
- Walter James Bird (1863–1953), organ builder based in Birmingham, England
- Warren Bird (born 1956), American writer and researcher
- Will R. Bird (1891–1984), Canadian writer
- Wallis Bird (born 1982), Irish musician

== See also ==
- Justice Bird (disambiguation)
- Byrd (surname), a variant spelling of the same surname
- Golding-Bird (disambiguation)
