= Robert Byrd (disambiguation) =

Robert Byrd (1917–2010) was a United States Senator from West Virginia.

Robert Byrd may also refer to:

- Robert Byrd (architect) (1904–1978), American architect
- Robert Byrd (artist) (born 1942), American author and illustrator
- Robert K. Byrd (1823–1885), American soldier and politician
- Robert L. Byrd, Delaware legislator and lobbyist
- Robert Byrd, American professional boxing referee, see Floyd Mayweather Jr. vs. Conor McGregor
- Bobby Byrd (1934–2007), American musician, songwriter and record producer (The Famous Flames)
- Bobby Day (1928–1990), also known as Bobby Byrd, American musician and songwriter (The Hollywood Flames, Bob & Earl)

== See also ==
- Robert Bird (disambiguation)
- Byrd (surname)
