= Jeffrey Byrd =

Jeffrey Byrd is the name of:

- Jeffrey J. Byrd, American biologist
- Jeffrey W. Byrd, American film director, producer and screenwriter
- Jeff Byrd (born 1956), American baseball pitcher
- Geoff Byrd (born 1970), American musician

== See also ==
- Geoffrey Bird (disambiguation)
