= Park School of Baltimore =

School in Baltimore County, Maryland, United States

The Park School of Baltimore
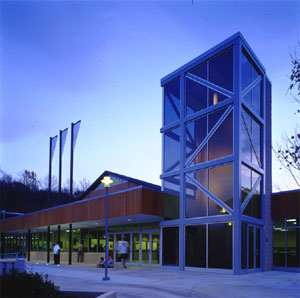
- Park's Athletic Center

Location
- 2425 Old Court Rd; Baltimore, MD 21208; United States; 39.3929°N 76.676°W

Information
- Founded: 1912
- CEEB code: 210812
- Principal: Matt Doyle (Lower School); Joshua Wolf (Middle School); Traci Wright (Upper School)
- Head of school: Daniel Paradis
- Grades: Pre-K to 12
- Gender: Co-Ed
- Age range: 4–18
- Colors: Brown and White
- Slogan: Learn to Think
- Song: Park School
- Mascot: Bruin
- Newspaper: The Postscript
- Yearbook: The Brownie
- Motto: Strive On!
- Website: http://www.parkschool.net

The Park School of Baltimore, known as Park, is a private, coeducational, PK-12, non-sectarian, progressive day school located in Baltimore County, Maryland. The school was founded in 1912 by Eli Frank Sr., Professor Hans Froelicher Sr., and General Lawrason Riggs as well as 13 other founding members. Today, the school enrolls approximately 800 students and employs 115 faculty with 99 advanced degrees and 15 PhDs among them.

== History ==
Park was founded in 1912 as a private K-12 school based on the principles of progressive education developed by John Dewey and others.

The creation of the school was spurred by the firing of Baltimore City's progressive Superintendent of Schools James Hixon Van Sickle by newly elected Mayor James H. Preston in 1911. At the time the city's private schools had quotas severely restricting the number of Jewish students admitted, and so Park adopted a policy of accepting all religions.

Park opened its doors to 98 students on September 30, 1912, in a three-story townhouse in the Auchentoroly Terrace Historic District across from Druid Hill Park. It was advertised as “A Country School in the City.”

As the school grew, it moved to a group of buildings on Liberty Heights Avenue in 1917.

In 1950, Park's student council passed a resolution calling for the school to "accept any applicant for admission, regardless of race, color or creed." In June 1954, one month after U.S. Supreme Court's Brown v. Board of Education decision desegregating public schools, Park's Board of Trustees voted "to receive any applications from any family suitable in interest and ambition," becoming the first private school in the city to do so. Black students began attending Park in 1955.

In 1959, Park moved to its current 100-acre campus on Old Court Road in Baltimore County. The school has undergone multiple expansions in recent years. More recent renovations include a new wing for science, mathematics, and technology in 1997; an Athletic Center in 2001; a new visual and dramatic arts wing in 2003; and a new science wing in 2023.

== Notable faculty and staff ==
- Laura Amy Schlitz is a librarian and storyteller who won the 2008 Newbery Medal for her children's book Good Masters! Sweet Ladies! Voices from a Medieval Village and the 2013 Newbery Honor for her children's novel Splendors and Glooms. Schlitz wrote the monologues in Good Masters! Sweet Ladies! for the 5th Grade curriculum. Her most recent book Princess Cora and the Crocodile was published in 2017.
- Angela Balcita, a long-time Upper School English teacher, is the author of Moonface: A True Romance . She has also had essays published in The New York Times, The Wilson Quarterly, and elsewhere. Notably, her story "I See My Superhero" was recorded by comedian Sarah Silverman for her podcast The Modern Love.

== Notable alumni ==
- Alan Frank Guttmacher ('15) – obstetrician/gynecologist, served as President of Planned Parenthood.
- Julius Westheimer ('29) – financial advisor, television, and radio personality.
- Robert Austrian ('33) – developer of the pneumonia vaccine.
- Jane Frank ('37) (Jane Schenthal Frank) – painter, sculptor, mixed media artist, and textile artist (as a child, her name was Jane Babette Schenthal).
- Jeffrey Alfred Legum ('59) – President and CEO of The Park Circle Motor Company.
- Martha Clarke ('62) – theater director and choreographer, MacArthur Award recipient.
- Edward Witten ('68) – mathematical physicist and one of the leading researchers in string theory.
- Steve Krulevitz ('69) – professional tennis player, was ranked No. 42 in the world and a member of the Israeli Davis Cup team.
- Amy Berman Jackson ('72) – United States district judge of the United States District Court for the District of Columbia.
- Tom Rothman ('72) – Chairman of Sony Pictures Entertainment's Motion Picture Group.
- Walt Handelsman ('75) – Pulitzer Prize-winning political cartoonist (1997 and 2007).
- Penny Johnson Jerald ('78) – actress, appeared in Fox television show 24 as the president's wife, Sherry Palmer.
- Benjamin Nathans ('79) - historian who won the 2025 Pulitzer Prize for General Nonfiction
- Lydia Kay Griggsby ('86) – Judge of the United States Court of Federal Claims and formerly Chief Counsel for Private and Information Policy for the Senate Judiciary Committee.
- Josh Tyrangiel ('90) – Executive Vice President, Vice Media/HBO.
- Matthew Porterfield ('95) – independent filmmaker; Hamilton (2006), Putty Hill (2011), and I Used to Be Darker (2013).
- Josh Dibb ('96) a.k.a. Deakin, David Portner ('97) a.k.a. Avey Tare, and Brian Weitz ('97) a.k.a. Geologist – members of the experimental music group Animal Collective.
- Amanda Lipitz ('98) – Tony Award-winning Broadway producer; director and producer of award-winning documentary STEP.
- Guy Blakeslee ('99) a.k.a. Entrance – musician currently signed to Tee Pee Records.
- Adam Gidwitz ('00) – New York Times bestselling children's book author of A Tale Dark & Grimm (Dutton Penguin, 2010) and Newbery Honoree for The Inquisitor’s Tale (Dutton Penguin, 2016).
- Annie Karni ('00) – journalist, White House Correspondent for the New York Times.
- Chris Keating ('00) and Anand Wilder ('00) – members of the experimental music group Yeasayer.
- Matthew Weiner – creator of the AMC television drama Mad Men.
- Ben Jacobs ('02) – journalist, political reporter for The Guardian.

== See also ==
- Baltimore County
- Educational progressivism
