= Van Sickle =

Van Sickle is a surname. Notable people with the surname include:

- Bruce Van Sickle (1917–2007), American judge
- Chad Van Sickle (born 1977), American boxer
- Clyde Van Sickle (1907–1995), American football player
- Frederick L. Van Sickle (born 1943), American judge
- Hank Van Sickle (born 1961), American musician
- James Hixon Van Sickle (1852–1926), American educator
- Neil D. Van Sickle (1915–2019), United States Air Force general
- Robert E. Van Sickle (born 1977), United States Army Sergeant, MMA fighter
- Robert L. Van Sickle (1955–2007), United States Marine Corps Sergeant

== See also ==
- Van Sickle Bi-State Park, state park in California and Nevada, United States
