= Robert Bird =

Bob, Bobby, or Robert Bird may refer to:

- Robert Montgomery Bird (1806–1854), American novelist, playwright, and physician
- Robert Bird (Welsh politician) (1839–1909), Welsh Liberal Party politician, mayor of Cardiff 1883
- Robert Merttins Bird (1788–1853), British civil servant in the Bengal Presidency
- Sir Robert Bird, 2nd Baronet (1876–1960), British Conservative Party politician, Member of Parliament (MP) for Wolverhampton West 1922–1929 and 1931–1945
- Robert Byron Bird (1924–2020), American chemical engineer and professor emeritus
- Bobby Bird, British musician
- Bob Bird (editor), Scottish newspaper editor
- Bob Bird (politician) (born 1951), American political activist and teacher
- Bob Bird (footballer) (1875–1946), former Australian rules footballer

== See also ==
- Robert Byrd (disambiguation)
- Bird (surname)
