= Barbara Bird =

American organizational behavior academic

- Born: Barbara Jean Bird
- Education: University of Western Ontario; University of Southern California
- Scientific career
- Fields: Entrepreneurship, organizational behavior
- Workplaces: Case Western Reserve University; American University
- Doctoral advisor: Warren Bennis

Barbara Jean Bird is an organizational behavior and entrepreneurship academic. She is a professor emerita of management at the Kogod School of Business at American University.

== Life ==
Bird was born to Jean and Jim. Bird earned a M.A. in the department of psychology at the University of Western Ontario. Her 1972 thesis was titled Differences in achievement motivation in women: the sex-role orientation of the situation. Her thesis was analyzed by Richard M. Sorrentino and Judith Ann Short in 1973. Bird completed a Ph.D. in business administration at the University of Southern California. Her 1983 dissertation was titled Intentional maps of entrepreneurs. Warren Bennis was her doctoral advisor.

William Gartner and Bird were part of, Young Turks, a network of entrepreneurship scholars. They were the second generation of scholars, following Donald L. Sexton, Karl H. Vesper, and Jeffry Timmons who had initiated the entrepreneurship interest group of the Academy of Management in the 1970s. In 1984, the Young Turks founded expanded the interest group into the entrepreneurship division (ENT). Bird served as the editor of its first newsletter that was published in November 1984. From 1989 to 1990, she was the ENT division chair.

In the 1980s, Bird was an assistant professor of organizational behavior at the Weatherhead School of Management at Case Western Reserve University. The researched the relationship between creativity and entrepreneurial activities. She joined the faculty at Kogod School of Business at American University in 1998. In 2012, she was promoted to full professor chair of its department of management. Bird was the first female full professor at Kogod. She retired in 2017, becoming a professor emerita of management.

== Selected works ==
- Bird, Barbara Jean (1989). Entrepreneurial Behavior. Scott Foresman. ISBN 978-0-673-39791-1. OCLC 1244724228.
