= ToddWorld =

American-Irish animated children's television series

- Genre: Children's television series Adventure
- Created by: Todd Parr; Gerry Renert
- Developed by: Carin Greenberg Baker; Todd Parr
- Voices of: Ryan Hirakida; Doron Bell; Maggie Blue O'Hara; Chantal Strand; Peter Kelamis; Britt McKillip
- Theme music composer: Cory Lerios
- Opening theme: "It's a Colorful World", performed by Smokey Robinson
- Ending theme: "It's a Colorful World" (Instrumental)
- Composers: Cory Lerios; George Gabriel
- Countries of origin: United States; Ireland; India
- Original language: English
- No. of seasons: 2
- No. of episodes: 39 (78 segments)

Production
- Executive producers: Bill Schultz; Todd Parr; Gerry Renert; Amy Sprecher; Mike Young (season 2); Liz Young (season 2); Paul Cummins; Tapaas Chakravarti (season 2); Melinda Toporoff (season 2)
- Producer: Siobhán Ní Ghadhra
- Running time: 23 minutes (11 minutes per segment)
- Production companies: Mike Young Productions; Telegael; DQ Entertainment

Original release
- Network: TLC; Discovery Kids
- Release: 8 November 2004 – 10 June 2008

ToddWorld is an animated children's television series created by Todd Parr and Gerry Renert through their California-based company SupperTime Entertainment. The series was produced by Mike Young Productions.

== Premise ==
The series focuses on the adventures of a boy named Todd and his friends: Benny, Pickle, Sophie, and Stella. The show is notable for its bold lines and bright colors. Each episode conveys a message about tolerance, diversity and acceptance.

== Characters ==
- Todd (voiced by Ryan Hirakida) is a boy with blue skin and five strands of hair. He likes to draw and to eat macaroni and cheese in the bathtub. Todd is an energetic and smart boy who enjoys creative hobbies, sports, and reading and making new things. His playful and kind personality leads him to easily make new friends, and Todd's curiosity in getting to know others makes him fairly open-minded when it comes to what makes people different. Todd is very attached to his pet dog, Benny, and often feels lonely if he is not around. At times, Todd can be a bit selfish if he really wants something, but he always learns right from wrong and makes up for it. There are also times when Todd is the voice of reason in the group, but is just as likely to act as zany as Pickle. Todd's catchphrases include "Neato Mosquito", "Leaping Lima Beans", "Mighty Macaroni", "Awesome Possum", "Hi, I'm Todd, and this is my world!", and "See you next time. Love, Todd".
- Benny (voiced by Doron Bell) is Todd's talking dog, who is very energetic and playful with a big appetite. He can be very lazy at times and sleeps in a lot, but also likes to hang out with the group. Benny values his bond with Todd, and Todd's opinion of him, above all else. While Benny acts cool outwardly, he, like the others, has his own concerns and worries.
- Pickle (voiced by Peter Kelamis) is one of Todd's best friends. He has green skin with a crown and purple polka-dotted pants. Pickle has three pet worms called "the Worminis" named Rupert, Bernard, and Francesca, who love to do acrobatic tricks. He lives in a circus tent with a menagerie of circus animals (a pink elephant named Edith, a pink monkey trapeze artist named Estelle, a dancing bear named Brian, and a lion named Greg). Pickle wants to have lots of fun and has many talents that he learned from growing up in a circus. Pickle is very curious about new experiences and people, although he may be a bit suspicious at first. Pickle often worries about a lot small things until he realizes that he should have just asked. Pickle's energetic and friendly personality allows him to easily bond with his friends and other people. Pickle may not be the brightest of the group, but he is capable of helping out or coming up with zany ideas.
- Sophie (voiced by Chantal Strand) is another one of Todd's best friends. She has yellow skin and two red pigtails that she can flap to fly. Sophie is very smart, creative, and loves to invent things, but can become quite stubborn if her plans do not work. Regardless, Sophie continues to search for new ideas. She cares a lot for others, with an empathy that allows her to easily befriend anyone. Sophie loves to have fun and tries not to instantly judge others. She lives in an apartment with her cat Mitzi, her pet goldfish Banana, and three adopted puppies: Oswald, Jake, and Inky.
- Stella (voiced by Maggie Blue O'Hara in season 1, and by Britt McKillip in season 2) is another friend of Todd. She is a very fashionable and attention-seeking girl with yellow skin who is quite obsessed with glitter, sparkles, stars, and hair accessories. Stella is a very caring and empathetic friend who will do what she can to make someone feel better. Stella is very mature and creative, but is not above begging or manipulating someone with tears to get what she wants.

== Episodes ==
=== Series overview ===
Series	Segments	Episodes	Originally released	
Series	Segments	Episodes	First released	Last released
1	52	26	8 November 2004	21 December 2005
2	26	13	16 April 2007	10 June 2008

=== Season 1 (2004–05) ===
No. overall	No. in season	Title	Original release date
1	1	"Todd Builds a Fort"	8 November 2004
1	1	"Stella's Different Ears"	8 November 2004
Todd wants to build a fort with his friends but has to learn to be open to others' ideas. Stella feels ashamed that she is the only one with two different colored ears, but learns that it is okay to be different. Music video: "A Special Shining Star" by Cyndy Bragg
2	2	"Todd Time"	9 November 2004
2	2	"Rock My World"	9 November 2004
Todd's desire to do things on his own is misinterpreted by his friends, who think there is something wrong with him. When Pickle forms a band that plays really loud and out-of-tune music, his friends do not like it but learn to respect Pickle's musical choices and support his efforts. Music video: "Your Own Drum" by Cyndy Bragg
3	3	"Prickly Partner"	10 November 2004
3	3	"Pickle's Smelly Socks"	10 November 2004
Sophie helps Ralph the Porcupine manage his quills so that Ralph can square dance with Sophie. Todd's friends try roundabout ways to tell Pickle his socks are smelly but learn it is more effective to be direct and just tell Pickle right away. Music video: "Join Us, Join In" by Taura "Aura" Jackson
4	4	"It's OK to Lose Your Mittens"	11 November 2004
4	4	"Stella's Special Club"	11 November 2004
After Benny loses Todd's special mittens his grandmother gives him, Benny fears that Todd will not love him anymore. Stella's exclusive club turns out to be no fun at all when she imposes strict rules and refuses to include everyone. Music video: "A Special Shining Star" by Cyndy Bragg (repeat episode 1)
5	5	"Worm's Eye View"	12 November 2004
5	5	"Pickle's Problem"	12 November 2004
Stella's negative opinion of worms is challenged when she spends a day with one of the Worminis. Pickle's mysterious behavior is finally explained when he reveals that he is too ashamed to show his friends that he needs to wear reading glasses. Music video: "Join Us, Join In" by Taura "Aura" Jackson (repeat episode 3)
6	6	"Venus Ice Cream Trap"	15 November 2004
6	6	"Platyroo"	15 November 2004
When Hector, the ice cream vendor, mistakenly believes that a new and unusual plant tried to bite him, Todd and his friends defend the misunderstood plant. When Todd and his friends find a lost baby platypus, Pedro, they help him find his mother, who just happens to be a kangaroo. Music video: "Your Own Drum" by Cyndy Bragg (repeat episode 2)
7	7	"Come Over to My House"	22 November 2004
7	7	"Sophie's Sinking Feeling"	22 November 2004
Todd and his friends learn to appreciate a new friend who is from a different place after visiting their alien friend Vark's house. Sophie invents a bathtub on wheels for Todd but becomes upset when no one listens to her ideas on how to build it. Music video: "Join Us, Join In" by Taura "Aura" Jackson (repeat episode 3)
8	8	"Who's Your Best Friend?"	29 November 2004
8	8	"Pretend Friend"	29 November 2004
Todd finds himself with an impossible dilemma when his friends pressure him to choose just one as his best friend. Pickle has trouble grasping the idea of Sophie having a pretend friend, a sock puppet named Toesie. Music video: "A Friend is a Friend" by Geoff Byrd
9	9	"Stella's Bad Dream"	28 March 2005
9	9	"Mommy Mitzi"	28 March 2005
Stella wishes everyone could be just like her until Stella has a dream which helps her learn to appreciate differences. When Mitzi wants to be a mother to three puppies, she first has to prove to Sophie and herself that a cat can raise puppies just as well as a dog. Music video: "Your Own Drum" by Cyndy Bragg (repeat episode 2)
10	10	"Bark in the Dark"	29 March 2005
10	10	"It's OK Not to Win"	29 March 2005
During a sleepover at Sophie's apartment, Todd is afraid to admit that he is afraid of the dark. Todd doubts his drawing talent after entering an art contest and losing. Music video: "A Friend is a Friend" by Geoff Byrd (repeat episode 8)
11	11	"It's OK to Have Wheels"	30 March 2005
11	11	"Princess Pirate"	30 March 2005
Todd, Sophie, and Pickle befriend Julian, a fellow artist who is in a wheelchair, and reinvents a game so Julian can join in. Sophie wants to play pirate, but Stella insists that girls cannot be pirates, only princesses. Music video: "Once You Get to Know Them" by Kel Mitchell and Taura "Aura" Jackson
12	12	"Monkeying Around"	31 March 2005
12	12	"No Place Like Home"	31 March 2005
When Todd and the gang compete in the Monkey Madness games, they are so intent on winning that they forget to have fun. Todd and Benny have a sleepover at Pickle's circus tent and find Pickle's lifestyle a little difficult to adjust to, but then they get used to it. Music video: "Join Us, Join In" by Taura "Aura" Jackson (repeat episode 3)
13	13	"Todd Takes a Stand"	8 April 2005
13	13	"Benny's Missing Chew Toy"	8 April 2005
A bully named Barry jeopardizes Todd and his friends' plan to ride a new playground slide. Benny jumps to conclusions by falsely accusing his friends of stealing his favorite ball, Bouncing Boris. Music video: "Take a Stand" by Geoff Byrd
14	14	"Colorful Friend"	25 May 2005
14	14	"It's OK to Say No to Bad Things"	25 May 2005
Thanks to Todd and his friends' acceptance, Xander the zebra learns to appreciate his rainbow-colored coat, even though it is different from the other zebras'. A hotshot skateboarder named Trina dares Todd and Pickle to try an especially dangerous stunt. Music video: "A Special Shining Star" by Cyndy Bragg (repeat episode 1)
15	15	"Sophie's Big Invention"	30 May 2005
15	15	"Dog's Day"	30 May 2005
Sophie has trouble admitting that she needs help with her latest invention, an automatic dogwasher. When Sophie invents a robot dog named Dempsey who is good at everything, Benny becomes jealous. Music video: "Your Own Drum" by Cyndy Bragg (repeat episode 2)
16	16	"Whole Lotta Limbo"	31 May 2005
16	16	"Shall We Dance?"	31 May 2005
Upset that he is too tall for limbo, Pickle discovers that he is just the right height for many other things. Benny's new dance moves cause conflict at a traditional summer dance. Music video: "Join Us, Join In" by Taura "Aura" Jackson (repeat episode 3)
17	17	"Dirt Day"	20 June 2005
17	17	"Mr. Cuddle Wuddle"	20 June 2005
Todd and his friends feel sorry for Vark, who is missing their holiday, Dirt Day, but soon discover Vark is celebrating a different and equally enjoyable holiday of his own. The puppies look up to their super cool Uncle Benny, which makes it very hard for him to admit to them that he still loves his puppy blanket, Mr. Cuddle Wuddle. Music video: "Once You Get to Know Them" by Kel Mitchell and Taura "Aura" Jackson (repeat episode 11)
18	18	"It's OK to Do Your Own Thing"	18 July 2005
18	18	"Follow That Alligator"	18 July 2005
Pickle learns to assert himself when his friends keep trying to pull him away from what Pickle really wants to do – practice jumping rope on his unicycle. In order to find the festival where Assante the alligator is playing his saxophone, Todd and his friends must learn to view the world from other creatures' perspectives. Music video: "Take a Stand" by Geoff Byrd (repeat episode 13)
19	19	"Beach Day"	24 August 2005
19	19	"New Kid on the Block"	24 August 2005
Todd's friends and a family of crabs are frightened of each other until they discover that they all have a lot in common despite their obvious differences. Todd and his friends discover the joys of communicating with a new friend who speaks a different language. Music video: "A Friend is a Friend" by Geoff Byrd (repeat episode 8)
20	20	"You Get What You Get"	28 September 2005
20	20	"Garden Variety Pickle"	28 September 2005
Todd learns to cope with disappointment and discovers that "you get what you get and you don't get upset." Todd and his friends plant a garden with their favorite flowers, and Pickle's favorite is a scraggly weed, proving beauty is in the eye of the beholder. Music video: "Take a Stand" by Geoff Byrd (repeat episode 13)
21	21	"Pizza on Earth"	9 October 2005
21	21	"Quill She or Won't She?"	9 October 2005
When Todd's generosity leads to turmoil in ToddWorld, he figures out a way to get everyone working together to restore peace. Sophie feels excluded when Ralph takes her to a "porcupines only" festival. Music video: "It Feels So Good When You Give" by Taura "Aura" Jackson
22	22	"Flavor of the Month"	16 October 2005
22	22	"Bark Like a Cat"	16 October 2005
When the kids and pets participate in a contest to create a new ice cream flavor, things become competitive very fast. A mother dog, who is at first critical of Mitzi's meowing pups, comes to recognize the value of a multi-cultural home life. Music video: "Your Own Drum" by Cyndy Bragg (repeat episode 2)
23	23	"Colorless Todd"	23 October 2005
23	23	"Underwear Everywhere"	23 October 2005
When Todd's color is accidentally zapped out of him, Todd and his friends learn it is not what color someone is on the outside but who they are on the inside that counts. When Sophie does not want to follow the new fashion trend of wearing underwear on her head, Sophie encounters pressure from the group to conform. Music video: "Take a Look Inside" by Al Jarreau
24	24	"It's OK to Talk with Your Hands"	15 November 2005
24	24	"Water U Thinking?"	15 November 2005
Todd and Pickle learn a new way to communicate when they meet Will, a deaf boy. When Sophie's fish Banana and his fish friend Finnegan get sick after a playdate in the pond, Todd realizes that selfish polluters are dirtying Finnegan's pond. Music video: "Take a Look Inside" by Al Jarreau (repeat episode 23)
25	25	"Peace is Reading All Kinds of Books"	13 December 2005
25	25	"A Roaring Success"	13 December 2005
Todd and Stella, critical of each other's choice of library book, learn to appreciate each other's choices when they accidentally switch books. Pickle is upset when the lion at his circus refuses to roar, but Pickle learns that it is not the roar that proves a lion's bravery. Music video: "Take a Look Inside" by Al Jarreau (repeat episode 23)
26	26	"Shoe In"	21 December 2005
26	26	"Itchy Itch"	21 December 2005
On a cold winter's day, Todd and his friends collect shoes for a centipede who cannot afford enough shoes for all of his feet. When Todd and Benny come down with a bad case of the Itchy Itch, they discover fun new ways to work around their infirmity. Music video: "It Feels So Good When You Give" by Taura "Aura" Jackson (repeat episode 21)

=== Season 2 (2007–08) ===
No. overall	No. in season	Title	Original release date
27	1	"Whatever Sways Your Swing"	16 April 2007
27	1	"A Trunkful of Trouble"	16 April 2007
Stella and Sophie help a hippo to play and eat in what they believe are the right ways, but they discover that the hippo's different methods of doing things are okay and even fun. Sophie's robot elephant goes haywire when Todd turns it on without asking. Music video: "It's Okay to be Different" by Milkshake
28	2	"For Yelling Out Loud"	17 April 2007
28	2	"Crazy for Cookies"	17 April 2007
Pickle learns how to make a new noise that is very cool and very loud. Now he just cannot stop! Stella's newly baked cookies disappear when she leaves them outside to cool. She accuses Benny, a known cookie lover, of eating them, until she sees the error in her thinking and finds the true culprits. Music video: "The Happy Song" by Milkshake
29	3	"The Hoppy-Poppy Pokey"	18 April 2007
29	3	"Stella's Star Day"	18 April 2007
Todd feels left out when he is the only one who does not enjoy the latest dance craze. The kids decide to do a show together and draw their roles from a hat. When Sophie wins the role of "Princess", Stella is so upset that she refuses to be in the show. However, Stella soon learns that having fun with her friends is more important than being the star. Music video: "Magic Potion" by Milkshake
30	4	"New Baby in Town"	19 April 2007
30	4	"Imagine That!"	19 April 2007
Sophie gets a new baby sister named Lily and a strange new emotion starts making Sophie act very weird. Officer Becky helps Sophie identify the emotion that Sophie is feeling jealous. It is a rainy day and the kids are stuck in Todd's fort, so they decide to have an "Invent-a-thon" contest. Pickle brings his young cousin Briny with him, and everyone assumes that Briny is just too little to come up with an invention on her own. However, Briny proves them wrong. Music video: "My Best Friend" by Milkshake
31	5	"Bye Bye Benny"	20 April 2007
31	5	"Big Feet"	20 April 2007
When Benny visits his grandma, Todd misses him a lot. His friends rally around Todd to help him pass the time until Benny returns. When Mama Kangaroo's little niece, Kiki, comes to visit, the kids are surprised by her very big feet. They are reluctant to play with her because of them but soon learn how wonderful her big feet are. Music video: "My Best Friend" by Milkshake (repeat episode 4)
32	6	"Benny and Sam"	10 September 2007
32	6	"A Big Messy Pickle"	10 September 2007
When Benny meets a doggie pal, Sam, who is covered in mud just like him, they have a blast playing together until Benny learns that Sam is a girl the following day. When Pickle makes such a mess in his room that he cannot find his ball, his friends help Pickle clean up so that he can find it. Music video: "My Best Friend" by Milkshake (repeat episode 4)
33	7	"Come Out of Your Shell"	11 September 2007
33	7	"The Big Picture"	11 September 2007
Todd and his pals make a new friend, Tyler, who is very shy. They try just about everything to get him to be more outgoing until they realize maybe Tyler is just fine the way he is. Todd has a dream of making a humongous drawing. He hopes his friends will help him pull it off. At first, they think Todd is foolish to even try something so difficult, but when everyone works together, they accomplish something that they can all be proud of. Music video: "It's Okay to be Different" by Milkshake (repeat episode 1)
34	8	"Gifted Friends"	12 September 2007
34	8	"Finders Keepers"	12 September 2007
Todd's big birthday party is coming up and all of ToddWorld is looking forward to it. However, Stella is appalled when she learns that Ralph is bringing a homemade gift to the party instead of something cool from the store. Todd finds an incredible skateboard motor in the park. Its owner is nowhere to be found, so he figures it is finders keepers. Music video: "It's Okay to be Different" by Milkshake (repeat episode 1)
35	9	"Potluck Picnic"	13 September 2007
35	9	"The Art of Change"	13 September 2007
Todd and the gang are upset when the picnic grounds are dirty and littered. They take it upon themselves to clean up the place so that they can enjoy their day there. Benny is unhappy when Todd changes their usual Saturday morning play date, but Benny realizes that his inflexible attitude is getting him nowhere, so Benny finds a way to bring about a win-win solution. Music video: "Magic Potion" by Milkshake (repeat episode 3)
36	10	"Snack Happy"	14 September 2007
36	10	"Back on the Bike"	14 September 2007
While the kids eat healthy lunches, Pickle sneaks off to eat snacks out of a machine, but later discovers that he has no fuel. Todd is reluctant to learn to unicycle after falling, so his friends encourage Todd to keep trying. Music video: "The Happy Song" by Milkshake (repeat episode 2)
37	11	"It's OK to Ask"	29 October 2007
37	11	"Bully for You"	29 October 2007
Stella invites Julian to her costume-sleepover party, but Pickle is extremely uncomfortable with Julian being there. Pickle finally admits to Julian that he is afraid that he might catch whatever it is that Julian has and will also end up in a wheelchair. Barry the "Bully" is looking for Todd and everyone can only assume that he is up to no good, except for Todd. Music video: "It's Okay to be Different" by Milkshake (repeat episode 1)
38	12	"Moving"	9 June 2008
38	12	"The Triple Treat Treasure Hunt Race"	9 June 2008
As the puppies grow bigger, Sophie's apartment seems to be getting smaller. So, Mitzi makes the difficult decision to move her and the puppies out to Sophie's uncle's farm so they can have a much bigger space. Hardy the hippo is determined to enter the ToddWorld Triple Treat Treasure Hunt Race. Unfortunately, he is not exactly a natural athlete, but once Hardy sets his mind to something, he follows through, no matter what. Even though Hardy does not win the race, he still has fun. Music video: "My Best Friend" by Milkshake (repeat episode 4)
39	13	"Super Sophie"	10 June 2008
39	13	"Hair We Go!"	10 June 2008
Sophie does something heroic that nobody sees, except for Todd. He is so impressed that Todd declares Sophie the town superhero, and like all superheroes, Sophie decides to keep her identity quiet, as it is a special secret between her and Todd. Todd makes up a game called "Now I'm Like You", where the kids pretend to be physically like one another. Stella is fascinated with Sophie's hair and wants hers to be just like it. Music video: "Magic Potion" by Milkshake (repeat episode 3)

==== Home Video ====
HiT Entertainment was the DVD and VHS distributor from 2005 to 2006.

== Broadcast ==
ToddWorld aired on TLC and Discovery Kids in the United States (as part of their Ready Set Learn! block), in the United Kingdom on CBeebies, and in Australia on ABC Kids.

The series continued to air on TLC until 2007 and Discovery Kids until 2008, and now airs on Kabillion and Ultra Kidz. It also aired on Qubo from 2014 until the network's shutdown in 2021.
