= Cyril Bird =

Cyril Bird may refer to:

- Fougasse (cartoonist) (Cyril Kenneth Bird, 1887–1965), British cartoonist
- Cyril Handley Bird (1896–1969), British businessman and politician
