= Jeffrey Alfred Legum =

American businessman (1941–2025)

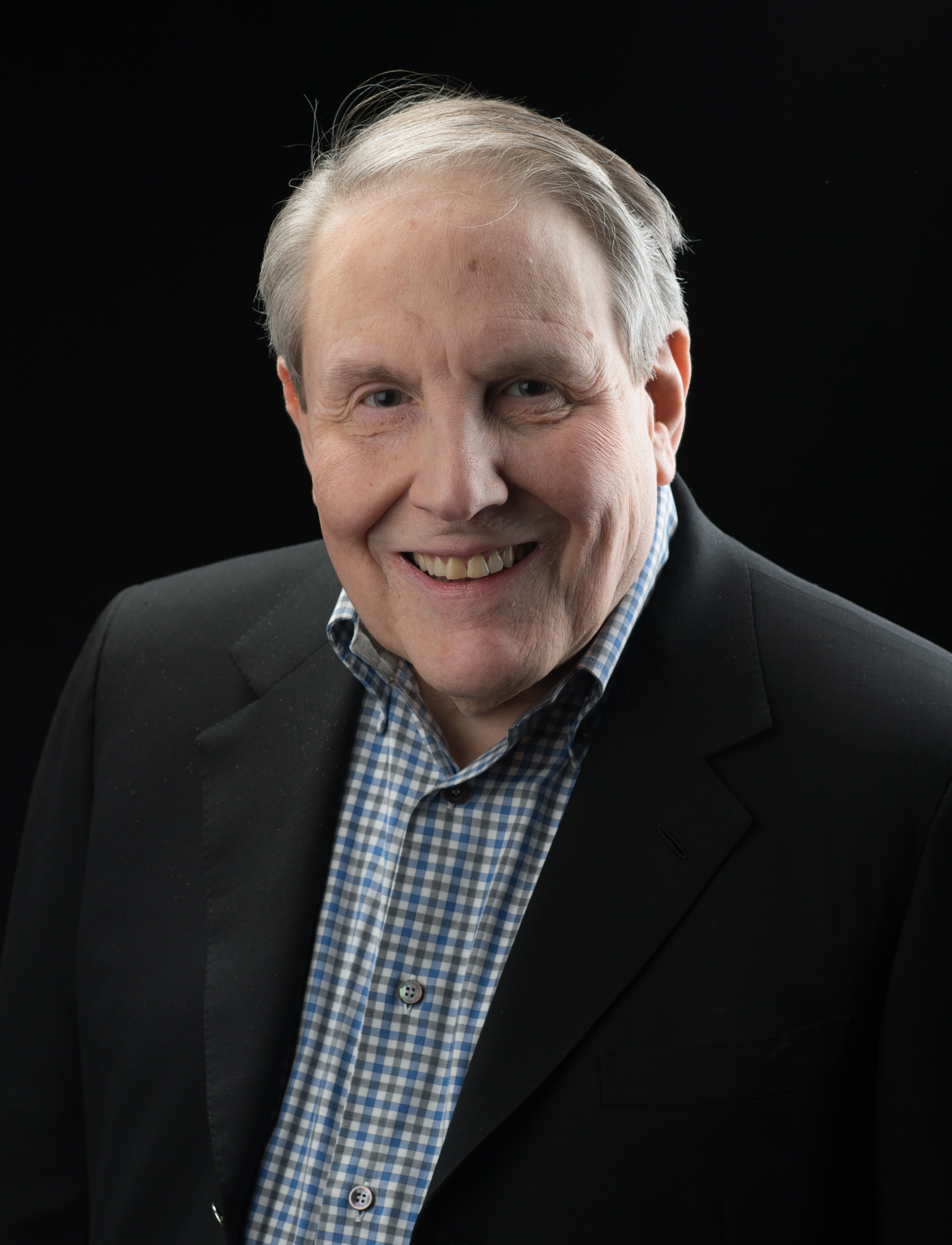
- Born: December 16, 1941; Baltimore, Maryland, U.S.
- Died: September 25, 2025 (aged 83)
- Education: Wharton School of Business
- Occupations: Philanthropist, investor, automobile dealer
- Spouse: Harriet Cohn (m. 1968)

Jeffrey Alfred Legum (December 16, 1941 – September 25, 2025) was an American philanthropist, investor and automobile dealer.

Legum was successful as an auto dealer, and as an investor. His investment advice helped build the endowments of both the Park School and the Baltimore Museum of Art.

== Early life and education ==
Legum was born in Baltimore, Maryland, on December 16, 1941. His father, Leslie Legum, was a developer of large industrial parks, and his mother, Naomi Legum, was the daughter of ice cream manufacturer, L. M. Hendler. Legum attended the University of Pennsylvania, majoring in economics and is listed as a distinguished alumnus of Wharton in business and finance.

== Park Circle Motor Company ==
Upon graduation from the University of Pennsylvania's Wharton School of Business with a B.S. degree in economics in 1963, Legum joined Park Circle Motor Company, which was founded in 1921 by Legum's grandfather. By 1986, he had grown the dealership to the third largest in the country. Legum's Westminster Motors provided limousines for the 1981 presidential inauguration.

In 1989, Legum sold his Chevrolet-Nissan dealership, retaining Westminster Chevrolet Cadillac, a dealership he had acquired in 1973. He sold Westminster in 1997, ending his involvement in the automobile business.

== Investment management and The Park Circle Company ==
Legum owned and was CEO of The Park Circle Company, DBA Park Circle Investments, a private investment company with interest in Baltimore-related corporations. In 1962, Park Circle Motor Company sold its wholly owned subsidiary, Truck Rental Company of Baltimore, to Avis in return for cash and 10% interest in Avis. In 1966, Park Circle and Lazard Freres sold Avis to ITT Corporation for stock in ITT. This cash and stock became the basis for Park Circle's original stock portfolio, which was managed by Legum. Legum's economic views have been quoted in Barron's.

== Personal life and death ==
In 1968, Legum married the former Harriet Cohn. He died on September 25, 2025, at the age of 83.

== Philanthropy ==
Legum was an active supporter of the Park School of Baltimore, the Baltimore Museum of Art, and the Johns Hopkins School of Medicine, where he endowed The Jeffrey and Harriet Legum Professorship in Acute Neurological Medicine and The John W. Griffin, MD Professorship in Neurology with a donation of $2.5 million.

Legum served on the board of directors of the Preakness Celebration, Inc. in 1988 and 1989 and was the vice president in 1989. He was also an Emeritus Trustee of the Park School of Baltimore and has donated over $1 million to the school.

In 2001, Jeffrey and Harriet Legum donated $1.5 million to Johns Hopkins School of Medicine to create a professorship in acute neurological medicine. More recently they gave an additional $1 million to the department of psychiatry to support a fellowship program.

In 2003, Legum and his wife donated $3 million to Johns Hopkins to help fund construction of a building which would house both clinical and basic research.

In 2021, Legum gave $110,000 to allow the Baltimore Museum of Art to keep their promise to increase the minimum wage for employees from $13.50 per hour to $15 per hour. Legum also gave money to the Kennedy Center to support the construction of the second building, The REACH.

In 2023 he gave $250,000 to Heartly House.
