= Justice Byrd =

Justice Byrd may refer to:

- Conley Byrd (1925–2014), associate justice of the Arkansas Supreme Court
- William M. Byrd (1819–1874), associate justice of the Alabama Supreme Court

== See also ==
- Justice Bird (disambiguation)
