= Geoffrey Bird =

Geoffrey Bird may refer to:

- Geoff Bird, musician
- Geoffrey Bird of the Bird baronets

== See also ==
- Jeffrey Byrd (disambiguation)
