= Ken Roberts (promoter) =

American music promoter

Ken Roberts (28 Feb 1941 - 22 May 2014) was a concert promoter who developed KROQ 106.7 FM into an important modern rock station, helping to introduce Prince, Culture Club, and Duran Duran.

Roberts was born in Hoboken, New Jersey. After attending Seton Hall University, he became a concert promoter in the 1960s, with such acts as The Temptations, Harry Belafonte and The Supremes.

When he took control of the KROQ in 1974, it was seven million dollars in debt, but he sold it for $45 million to Infinity Broadcasting in 1986. This was the highest price paid for a US radio station up to that time.

Roberts was owner of The Robert Taylor Ranch, a private, 112-acre property nestled in the Mandeville Canyon within Los Angeles' affluent Brentwood neighborhood. He purchased it in 1975 for $900,000 In 2010 he was forced to sell the estate for $27.5 million to hedge fund New Stream Capital to repay his loans.
