= Laura Amy Schlitz =

American children's author (born 1955)

- Born: 28 May 1955 (age 71); Baltimore, Maryland, U.S.
- Education: Goucher College (BA)
- Occupations: Writer, and Lower School Librarian at the Park School
- Writing career
- Language: English
- Notable works: Good Masters! Sweet Ladies!; Splendors and Glooms; The Hired Girl
- Notable awards: Cybils Award; 2006 A Drowned Maiden's Hair: A Melodrama Newbery Medal; 2008 Good Masters! Sweet Ladies! Newbery Honor; 2013 Splendors and Glooms Scott O'Dell Award for Historical Fiction; 2016 The Hired Girl National Jewish Book Award; 2016 The Hired Girl Sydney Taylor Book Award; 2016 The Hired Girl

Laura Amy Schlitz (born 28 May 1955) is an American author of children's literature. She is a librarian and storyteller at the Park School of Baltimore in Brooklandville, Maryland.

She received the 2008 Newbery Medal for her children's book entitled Good Masters! Sweet Ladies! Voices from a Medieval Village, and the 2013 Newbery Honor for her children's book, Splendors and Glooms. She also won the 2016 Scott O'Dell Award for Historical Fiction, the 2015 National Jewish Book Award, and the Sydney Taylor Book Award for her young adult book, The Hired Girl.

== Life ==
Schlitz attended Goucher College in Towson, Maryland, and graduated in 1977. She worked for the Enoch Pratt Library. She is a librarian at the Park School of Baltimore.

Her other published books are The Hero Schliemann: The Dreamer Who Dug For Troy (2006), A Drowned Maiden's Hair: A Melodrama (2006), which won a Cybils Award that year, The Bearskinner: A Tale of the Brothers Grimm (2007), The Night Fairy (2010), Princess Cora and the Crocodile (2017), and Amber and Clay (2021).

== Good Masters! Sweet Ladies! ==
Good Masters! Sweet Ladies! Voices from a Medieval Village comprises more than twenty one-person plays and two two-person plays. The 10- to 15-year-old characters all live in or near a 13th-century English manor.

The monologues were written for the 5th Grade curriculum at The Park School during an F. Parvin Sharpless Faculty and Curricular Advancement Program (FACA) at the school.

The book was awarded the 2008 Newbery Medal for excellence in children's literature.

== Splendors and Glooms ==
The main character, rich girl Clara Wintermute, lives with her parents in a wealthy section of London. Her greatest wish for her birthday is for the puppet troupe she saw in a park one day to perform for her and her party guests. So the puppet master, Grisini, and his assistants, 14-year-old Lizzie Rose Fawr and 12-year-old Parsefall Hooke, visit the Wintermute home and put on their show. Then, not long after they visit, young Clara goes missing. Alleged kidnappers demand ransom from her parents, and Clara's father, Dr. Wintermute, brings the ransom to the appointed place, but the kidnapper never shows up. Meanwhile, an old witch is using her magic to summon Grisini to her estate near Lake Windermere. All of the children's lives soon become entangled with Grisini; the witch, Cassandra; and the Wintermutes. And all the while, Clara is being hidden in plain sight.

The book was awarded the 2013 Newbery Honor for excellence in children's literature.

== List of published books ==
Candlewick Press published all eight books that are listed under Schlitz's name in the U.S. Library of Congress catalog.

- A Drowned Maiden's Hair: A Melodrama (2006), Cybils Award winner
- The Hero Schliemann: the dreamer who dug for Troy (2006), (illustrated by Robert Byrd)
- The Bearskinner: a tale of the Brothers Grimm (2007), retold by Schlitz, (illustrated by Max Grafe)
- Good Masters! Sweet Ladies! Voices from a Medieval Village (2007), Newbery Medal Winner (illustrated by Robert Byrd)
- The Night Fairy (2010), (illustrated by Angela Barrett)
- Splendors and Glooms (2012), Newbery Honor winner
- The Hired Girl (2015), Scott O'Dell Award for Historical Fiction, Sydney Taylor Book Award, and National Jewish Book Award winner
- Princess Cora and the Crocodile (2017), (illustrated by Brian Floca)
- Amber and Clay (2021), (illustrated by Julia Iredale)
- The Winter of the Dollhouse (2025)

Schlitz also wrote A Gypsy at Almack's, an adult romance novel, under the name of Chloe Cheshire.
