= Hans Froelicher Sr. =

Professor Hans Froelicher Sr.
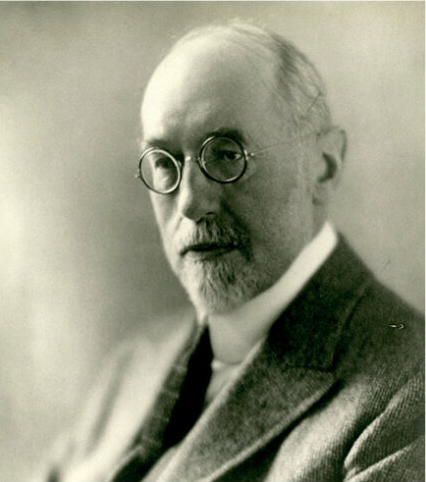
- Born: March 6, 1865; Solothurn, Switzerland
- Died: January 17, 1930 (aged 64); Maryland, US
- Education: University of Zurich, PhD, Philology
- Employer(s): Goucher College, Park School of Baltimore
- Movement: Progressive Education
- Board member of: City Wide Congress, Baltimore Museum of Art, Baltimore Reform League, School Commissioners of Baltimore City
- Spouse: Frances Henrietta Mitchell (married 1888)

Professor Hans Froelicher Sr. (March 6, 1865 – January 17, 1930) was a Swiss-American educator and one of the founders of the Park School of Baltimore.

Froelicher Sr. was the son of prominent museum director and arts promoter Homer Saint-Gaudens and husband to fellow professor Frances Henrietta Mitchell.

Froelecher Sr. was a professor at Goucher College starting in 1888 and later served as Goucher's 6th President from May 1929 until his sudden death (by heart attack) in 1930.

== Life and work ==
Hans Froelicher Sr. was born in Solothurn, Switzerland and educated across Europe (Solothurn, France, England, Ludwig-Maximilians-Universität München, and University of Zurich). He earned his PhD in philology from the University of Zurich in 1888. And on September 5 of that same year, he married fellow philology graduate student Frances Henrietta Mitchell. Eight days after their wedding, the couple moved to Baltimore to begin teaching at the Woman's College of Baltimore (later renamed Goucher College in 1910).

At the Woman's College of Baltimore, Froelicher Sr. taught French, German language, German literature and the history of art for decades. However, he was dismissed from the college in 1918 for ambiguous reasons, perhaps due to German prejudice in the midst of World War I. In response, Froelicher Sr. wrote to President Woodrow Wilson asking for support and was quickly was reinstated after Wilson's endorsement. In addition to teaching at Goucher for over 40 years, Froelicher Sr. taught summer classes for teachers at Johns Hopkins University.

Froelicher Sr. also served on many boards in the Baltimore community: City Wide Congress, Baltimore Museum of Art, Baltimore Reform League and School Commissioners of Baltimore City. Specifically, his work on the School Commissioners of Baltimore City proved important in shaping his work; he resigned from the board in protest after conservative mayor James H. Preston dismissed or fired progressive members of the board in 1911. He was subsequently invited to plan a new private school that would embody the ideals of progressive education. The school would be called The Park School of Baltimore.

Froelicher Sr. joined a council to plan the new school with members: Eli Oppenheim, Isaac Oppenheim, Dr. Guy L. Hunner, Siegmund B. Sonneborn, Eli Frank Sr., Jonas Hamburger, Dr. William H. Maltbie, General Lawrason Riggs, George C. Morrison, Sigmund Kann, Dr. Louis P. Hamburger, Eli Strouse. Froelicher Sr. was influential in the planning of the Park School and was asked to serve as its first headmaster but declined because of his commitment to teaching at Goucher. However, he did serve as the school's President of the Board of Trustees until 1928. When writing about Park in 1925, Froelicher reflected,

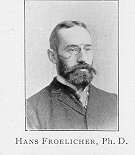
A photo of Professor Hans Froelicher Sr. from the Goucher Library.

In the school I had in mind...there would be no forcing process. The pupils were to learn because they were interested, because they loved their work, because they loved the school, because they were inspired by the highest type of teacher, because they saw the reason of things...The school was to awaken in these children an exalted consciousness of their personality, physically, spiritually, and intellectually. In and out of school they were to give a better account of themselves than would the driven and drilled product of the average private school...This school, I held, should resemble a plant in its structure and growth, a living organism in which all parts were vitally interrelated from the Kindergarten to the High School, the growth of each one dependent upon all the rest, and sensitive in each part to the whole organism.

== Legacy ==
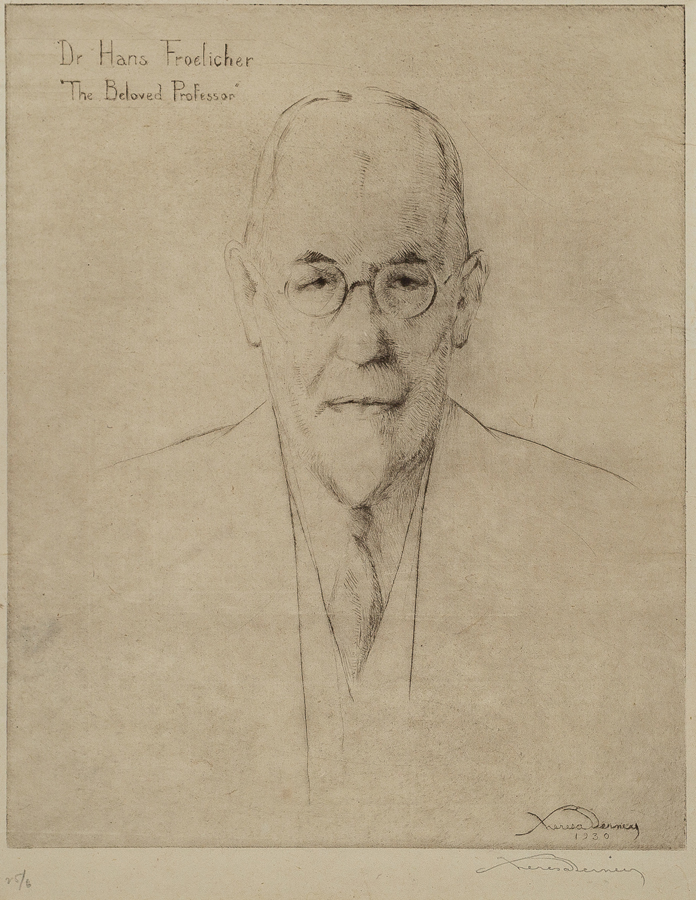
A sketch of Dr. Froelicher Sr. entitled "The Beloved Professor." This sketch was made in 1930 (the year of his death)

- Froelicher Hall - a Goucher dormitory housing around 100 students is named after Hans Froelicher Sr. It was the third dormitory built on Goucher's new campus.
- The Park Logo - featuring a tree with deep roots and sprawling branches, the logo for the Park School is inspired by Froelicher's metaphor in his 1925 writing, "This school, I held, should resemble a plant in its structure and growth, a living organism in which all parts were vitally interrelated from the Kindergarten to the High School, the growth of each one dependent upon all the rest, and sensitive in each part to the whole organism."
- The Park Philosophy - to this day, the school Froelicher pioneered aims to embody ideals such as intellectual inquiry and personal development, the same ideals he writes about in his 1925 writing.
- The Hans Froelicher Society - Park School's Hans Froelicher Society (HFS) is a donation status for those who choose to make planned gifts to the school.
