= Good Masters! Sweet Ladies! =

There are 17 monologues and 2 dialogues

Good Masters! Sweet Ladies! Voices from a Medieval Village
- Author: Laura Amy Schlitz
- Language: English
- Published: July 24, 2007 Candlewick Press
- Media type: Print (Hardcover, paperback)
- Pages: 96
- Awards: Newbery Medal
- ISBN: 0-7636-1578-1
- OCLC: 53178700
- Dewey Decimal: 812.6
- LC Class: PS3619.C43 C55 2007

Good Masters! Sweet Ladies! Voices from a Medieval Village is a 2007 children's book written by Laura Amy Schlitz. The book was awarded the 2008 Newbery Medal for excellence in children's literature.

== Overview ==
Instead of the typical narrative structure, the book is constructed of a series of monologues, each spoken by a young member of a medieval village. Each character has a monologue with the exceptions of Petronella and Jacob, and Mariot and Maud, who have dialogues. The book was originally written to be performed by fifth-grade students at the Park School of Baltimore, where Schlitz is a librarian. It contains nineteen monologues and two dialogues, with the characters ranging from a runaway boy to the lord's daughter.

== Monologues/Dialogues (in order of appearance) ==
- Hugo, the Lord's nephew
- Taggot, the blacksmith's daughter
- Will, the plowboy
- Alice, the shepherdess
- Thomas, the doctor's son
- Constance, the pilgrim
- Mogg, the villein's daughter
- Otho, the miller's son
- Jack, the half-wit
- Simon, the knight's son
- Edgar, the falconer's son
- Isobel, the Lord's daughter
- Barbary, the mud slinger
- Jacob Ben Salomon, the moneylender's son and Petronella, the merchant's daughter
- Lowdy, the varlet's child
- Pask, the runaway
- Piers, the glassblower's apprentice
- Mariot and Maud, the glassblower's daughters
- Nelly, the sniggler
- Drogo, the tanner's apprentice
- Giles, the beggar

== Critical reception ==
According to Kirkus Reviews, "Schlitz takes the breath away with unabashed excellence in every direction." Deirdre F. Baker wrote in The Horn Book Magazine, "Byrd's pristine, elegant pen-and-ink illustrations in opulent colors make the book almost too visually appealing, belying the realistically dirty, stinky conditions described in the text." John Schwartz, in The New York Times, called Schlitz a "talented storyteller" and praised the book for its frank depiction of the Middle Ages. Nina Lindsay, chair of the Newbery Medal committee, called the monologues "superb" and stated that as a whole, they "create a pageant that transports readers to a different time and place."

In 2008, Anita Silvey, author of 100 Best Books for Children, described Good Masters! Sweet Ladies! in a School Library Journal article as one of several recent Newbery winners considered "particularly disappointing" by public librarians. Silvey "criticized the Newbery selections as too difficult for most children." Writing for Slate, Erica S. Perl responded to this criticism, saying that while her younger self might not have enjoyed the subject matter or archaic language, her "inner drama geek" would have enjoyed the theatrical elements.

Awards
Preceded by The Higher Power of Lucky	Newbery Medal recipient 2008	Succeeded by The Graveyard Book
