= Robert Taylor Ranch =

House in Los Angeles, California

- Interactive map of the Robert Taylor Ranch area

General information
- Type: House
- Architectural style: Ranch-style house
- Location: 3099 Mandeville Canyon Road, Los Angeles, California, USA
- Coordinates: 34.0998°N 118.503°W
- Completed: 1956; 70 years ago

Design and construction
- Architect: Robert Byrd

The Robert Taylor Ranch is a ranch located on Mandeville Canyon Road, in the Brentwood section of Los Angeles, California. The ranch was built in 1956 for Waite Phillips and designed by architect Robert Byrd. It is about 112 acres (45 ha) large, with more than 20,000 square feet (1,900 m^{2}) of living space.

American actor Robert Taylor owned the ranch for several years before his death in 1969. The ranch was then purchased by Steven J. Earle, then sold in 1974 to Ken Roberts, former owner of the KROQ-FM radio station. The ranch is also the setting for most of the 1983 Sam Peckinpah movie, The Osterman Weekend.

In 2010, the ranch was sold to hedge fund New Stream Capital to settle a $27,500,000 legal claim. On November 30, 2012, the ranch was resold at an auction for $12 million to Fred Latsko, a Chicago-based real estate developer. The auction was conducted by Concierge Auctions in partnership with Hilton & Hyland, an affiliate of Christie's International Real Estate. The auction firm and Hilton & Hyland identified 761 buyer prospects and 12 bidders in only four weeks.
