= Golding-Bird =

Golding-Bird is a surname. Notable people with the surname include:

- Cuthbert Hilton Golding-Bird (1848–1939), British surgeon and son of Golding Bird
- Cyril Golding-Bird (1876–1955), Anglican bishop

== See also ==
- Golding Bird (1814–1854), British medical doctor
