= The Osterman Weekend =

1972 novel by Robert Ludlum

- First edition
- Author: Robert Ludlum
- Language: English
- Genre: Thriller
- Publisher: World Publishing
- Publication date: 1972
- Publication place: United States
- Media type: Print (hardback & paperback)
- Pages: 315 pp
- ISBN: 0-529-04547-8
- OCLC: 279044
- Dewey Decimal: 813/.5/4
- LC Class: PZ4.L9455 Os PS3562.U26

The Osterman Weekend is a thriller novel by Robert Ludlum. First published in 1972, it was the author's second book. The novel was the basis for the film of the same title.

== Plot ==
John Tanner, Director of News of a US TV network, is convinced by a CIA agent that the friends he has invited to a weekend in the country are engaged in a conspiracy, called Omega, that threatens national security. Everything John Tanner thinks he knows about his closest friends is overturned, and he is set against them. When Omega finally reveals itself, he realizes that he has been manipulated from the very start.
