= The Osterman Weekend (film) =

1983 film by Sam Peckinpah

- Theatrical release poster
- Directed by: Sam Peckinpah
- Screenplay by: Alan Sharp
- Adaptation by: Ian Masters
- Based on: The Osterman Weekend by Robert Ludlum
- Produced by: Peter S. Davis; William N. Panzer
- Starring: Rutger Hauer; John Hurt; Craig T. Nelson; Dennis Hopper; Burt Lancaster
- Cinematography: John Coquillon
- Edited by: Edward M. Abroms; David Rawlins
- Music by: Lalo Schifrin
- Production companies: Davis-Panzer Productions; Osterman Weekend Associates
- Distributed by: 20th Century Fox
- Release date: November 4, 1983 (U.S.)
- Running time: 102 minutes
- Country: United States
- Language: English
- Box office: $6,486,797

The Osterman Weekend is a 1983 American suspense thriller film directed by Sam Peckinpah, based on the 1972 novel by Robert Ludlum. It stars Rutger Hauer, John Hurt, Burt Lancaster, Dennis Hopper, Meg Foster, Helen Shaver, Chris Sarandon and Craig T. Nelson.

The film was released by 20th Century Fox on November 4, 1983. It was Peckinpah's final film; he died less than two months after its premiere. Critical reviews were mixed to negative, while the film had a mediocre financial performance upon theatrical release but fared much better on home video.

== Plot ==
CIA Director Maxwell Danforth reviews video of Agent Laurence Fassett and his wife Zuna having sex. KGB agents kill Zuna while Fassett showers. Consumed by grief and rage, yet unaware of CIA sanction for the killing, Fassett hunts the assassins in vain. To his superior, Fassett reports having uncovered "Omega," a Soviet spy network, including television producer Bernard Osterman, plastic surgeon Richard Tremayne, and stock trader Joseph Cardone. Fassett advises they turn one into a double agent to unravel the entire network.

Fassett recruits controversial television journalist John Tanner, who has been close friends with the three since they attended Berkeley together, and is already set to host them at an upcoming annual weekend gathering they call "The Osterman" after its founder. Tanner, highly critical of government abuses of power, is initially skeptical, but Fassett exposes his friends as Omega agents with videotaped meetings with a KGB agent. The Russian and Cardone argue on "targeting" Tanner as a threat; Tremayne receives assurance on leaving the country after "it" goes down; Osterman wants "radical change" with handsome payment to a Swiss bank account. Tanner eventually agrees on condition that Danforth appears on his show, Face to Face.

John, anticipating trouble, asks his wife Ali to take their son Steve out of town, but cannot tell her why, which upsets her. Their car is ambushed on the way to the airport; Ali and Steve are kidnapped. Fassett intervenes, rescuing them. The Tanners' home is wired for closed circuit video, and Fassett observes from a van, protected by armed agents near their property.

Osterman, Tremayne and Cardone arrive tense, after being spooked by CIA psyops that someone knows about "Omega". Fassett heightens tension through television video feeds focusing on illegal financial manipulation through banking in Switzerland. Ali punches Tremayne's wife Virginia for trashing John. Bernard tells John that he is getting himself into something out of his depth, and everyone retires to their rooms. Steve discovers the family dog's severed head in the refrigerator, but it is a fake. John has had enough and demands that his guests leave. John confronts Fassett and insists he arrest the suspects. Fassett orders his men to kill Osterman, but he is expert in martial arts and kills one of them barehanded.

Cardone and Tremayne and their wives escape in John's recreational vehicle. John confronts and assaults Bernard, but John is easily overpowered; Bernard demands an explanation. John tells Bernard that he knows his friends are Soviet agents. Bernard dismisses the accusation, explaining they only sheltered their money in Swiss accounts to avoid taxation, and insists they are not traitors. Via CCTV, Fassett admits Osterman and his friends are only tax evaders, then kills the Tremaynes and Cardones by remotely detonating explosives in John's RV. He sends his soldiers into the house to kill Osterman and Tanner. Fassett taunts Tanner during the attack on the house, revealing that Danforth authorized his wife's murder.

Meanwhile, Ali, having escaped the house earlier, uses her hunting bows to kill two of Fassett's men. Tanner kills a third with a pistol crossbow; however, Fassett captures Ali and Tanner, ransoming them in exchange for John exposing Danforth live on television.

Later, from his office, Danforth responds remotely to Tanner's interview questions. Tanner then introduces Fassett on the air, and Fassett, who is also being filmed remotely, exposes Danforth as a murderer. Enraged when he realizes that he has been tricked, Danforth publicly unleashes a paranoid diatribe and threatens Fassett's life.

Fassett's secret remote location is tracked through the video transmission by Tanner himself, who had pre-recorded his questions for both men with Osterman's assistance. Tanner locates and kills Fassett. The angle from which Fassett's death is captured on camera protects Tanner's anonymity, while also appearing to confirm Danforth's threats in real time. John then rescues Ali, Steve, and their dog.

== Cast ==
- Rutger Hauer as John Tanner
- John Hurt as Lawrence Fassett
- Craig T. Nelson as Bernard Osterman
- Dennis Hopper as Richard Tremayne
- Chris Sarandon as Joseph Cardone
- Meg Foster as Ali Tanner
- Helen Shaver as Virginia Tremayne
- Cassie Yates as Betty Cardone
- Sandy McPeak as Walter Stennings
- Christopher Starr as Steve Tanner
- Burt Lancaster as Maxwell Danforth
- Merete Van Kamp as Zuna Brickman

== Production ==
William Castle initially purchased the film rights and asked author Ludlum to write the script. Ludlum was reluctant. Despite his extensive film and theatre experience, he said "I didn't leave that crowd of ocelots to go back into it." In 1972 Dalton Trumbo was announced as the screenwriter.

As related in the documentary Alpha to Omega: Exposing The Osterman Weekend, producers Peter S. Davis and William N. Panzer were celebrating the wrapping of a film when they ran into Larry Jones. Jones, also a producer, revealed that he owned the film rights to Robert Ludlum's 1972 novel The Osterman Weekend, but was giving up on turning it into a feature film since he had not been able to develop a satisfactory screenplay. Davis and Panzer immediately offered to purchase the rights, as they felt this could be the project that elevated them out of the B-movie features that they had been financing up to that point. Jones and a partner agreed, and Davis and Panzer began pre-production.

They hired Ian Masters to adapt Ludlum's complex story for the screen. Davis claims that Masters followed conspiracy theories and closely paid attention to the CIA's activities throughout the world. After Masters developed the script's groundwork, Alan Sharp was hired to work on characters and dialogue. With the screenplay completed they went looking for a director, and an offhand comment led them to Sam Peckinpah, the controversial and troubled man who had helmed The Wild Bunch (1969) and Straw Dogs (1971). Suffering from a damaged reputation due to alcohol and drug addiction (noted most recently on the set of his 1978 film Convoy), Peckinpah had been given the opportunity to do second unit work on Don Siegel's Jinxed! in 1981. The competence and professionalism he displayed made it possible for him to be considered as director of The Osterman Weekend.

Peckinpah said "It's a good book and I think it'll make a good movie."

Many studios did not want to work with Peckinpah because of his antagonistic relationship with producers. Due to the director's damaged reputation, the producers were forced to seek financing from independent sources. According to the commentators on the film's special edition DVD, Peckinpah hated Ludlum's novel and he did not like the screenplay either. Peckinpah requested and was given permission to work on the script himself, but after submitting his first few pages the producers forbade him from any more rewrites.

In Marshall Fine's book Bloody Sam, screenwriter Sharp said that he himself did not like the screenplay he had written, and that he found it incredible that Davis and Panzer used his draft as the shooting script. Fine also wrote that Ludlum had stated to his friend Jason Robards that he would provide a free rewrite; which never happened. In spite of his distaste for the project, Peckinpah immediately accepted the job as he was desperate to re-establish himself within the film community.

During pre-production, producer Helmut Dantine died of a heart attack.

Multiple actors in Hollywood auditioned for the film, intrigued by the chance of working with the legendary director. Many of those who signed on, including John Hurt, Burt Lancaster and Dennis Hopper, did so for less than their usual salaries for an opportunity to work with Peckinpah. Rutger Hauer, fresh from the success of Blade Runner, was chosen by the producers for the lead role. For the film's primary location, the Tanner household, the filmmakers chose Robert Taylor's former residence in the Mandeville Canyon section of Los Angeles, the "Robert Taylor Ranch".

Peckinpah managed to keep up with the 54-day shooting schedule and within a budget of just under $7 million, but his relationship with the producers soon soured and he became combative. By the time shooting wrapped in January 1983, Peckinpah and the producers were hardly speaking. Peckinpah delivered the film on time and on budget, submitting his cut to the producers.

This version was screened once on May 25, 1983. Test audiences reacted unfavorably and many walked out of the theater during the first few minutes. Panzer and Davis were hoping that Peckinpah would re-edit the film himself because they did not desire to antagonize him any further, but the director refused to make changes. Peckinpah had also filmed several satirical scenes, subtly ridiculing the product. As a result, the producers felt they had no choice and effectively fired Peckinpah and re-edited the film themselves.

The producers changed the opening sequence and deleted other scenes they deemed unnecessary. Peckinpah proclaimed that producers had sabotaged his film, a complaint he had also made after filming Major Dundee (1965) and Pat Garrett and Billy the Kid (1973).

== Release ==
Theatrical distribution was handled by 20th Century Fox.

=== Home media ===
Thorn EMI picked up the initial video rights; a laserdisc edition was published by Image Entertainment. It is currently available on DVD and Blu-ray from Anchor Bay Entertainment, which has included the director's cut of the film on its DVD release, but sourced from a low-quality, full-screen videotape.

In 2022, the Australian distributor Imprint released a 2-disc limited edition Blu-ray of The Osterman Weekend. Disc 1 includes a 1080p high-definition presentation of the theatrical cut in 1.78:1 aspect ratio and an alternative unrestored presentation of the film in 1.66:1 aspect ratio scanned from a 35mm German print. Disc 2 includes a 1080p high-definition, unrestored 2K scan of the director's cut sourced from Sam Peckinpah's personal 35mm negative. The release also includes two audio commentaries and several documentaries, including the feature documentary Alpha to Omega: Exposing “The Osterman Weekend”.

== Reception ==
=== Box office ===
The film was not a blockbuster, though it grossed $6 million domestically and did extremely well in Europe and on the new home-video market.

=== Critical response ===
Critics reacted unfavorably towards the film, with one of the common complaints being that the story was full of plot holes. Roger Ebert of The Chicago-Sun Times gave the film 1 star out of 4 and wrote how the convoluted plot and unclear character motivations led to his feeling confusion and anger “because the movie was not holding up its side of the bargain. It was making no sense. I don't demand that all movies make sense. I sometimes enjoy movies that make no sense whatsoever, if that's their intention. But a thriller is supposed to hold together in some sort of logical way, isn't it?'" Similarly, Dave Kehr of The Chicago Reader stated: "The structure is a mess...which ultimately makes it too difficult to tell whether its oddly compelling qualities are the result of a coherent artistic strategy or the cynical carelessness of a director sidelined." Vincent Canby of the New York Times described The Osterman Weekend was "incomprehensible" and "full of gratuitous sex and violence", but "has a kind of hallucinatory craziness to it".

It currently holds a 45% approval rating on Rotten Tomatoes from 20 reviews.

== Alpha to Omega: Exposing The Osterman Weekend ==
Alpha to Omega: Exposing The Osterman Weekend is a 2004 documentary about the making of The Osterman Weekend. It was included as a special feature on Anchor Bay Entertainment's 2004 DVD release of the film. Featuring interviews with many members of the cast and crew, it not only examines the process of bringing Ludlum's novel to the screen, but also provides a portrait of Peckinpah's approach to the filmmaking process and of his frame of mind and physical health following years of substance abuse. It was directed by Jonathan Gaines, who co-wrote it with Michael Thau, who was also the editor.

Interviews:

- William N. Panzer
- Peter S. Davis
- Rutger Hauer
- John Hurt
- Chris Sarandon
- Craig T. Nelson
- Cassie Yates
- Nick Redman
- Meg Foster
- Martin Baum
- Helen Shaver
- Edward Abroms
- Lalo Schifrin

== Potential remake ==
In May 2007, it was reported Summit Entertainment as part of its transition to a "full service studio" was developing a new adaptation of The Osterman Weekend from the first film's producers William N. Panzer and Peter S. Davis with Simon Kinberg slated to write and make his directorial debut with the film. Initially Summit intended to start shooting in late 2007, but the film entered development hell with reports in October 2009 stating the film was still "in development". In September 2010, it was reported that Jesse Wigutow was providing re-writes for the film with Kinberg having since stepped back into a producer's role and Robert Schwentke now slated to direct. In February 2012, it was reported Brian Kirk was now in talks to direct the film. After 2012 no further updates were given on the status of the remake.

== See also ==
- List of films featuring surveillance
