= Justice Bird =

Justice Bird may refer to:

- George E. Bird (1847–1926), associate justice of the Maine Supreme Judicial Court
- John E. Bird (1862–1928), associate justice of the Michigan Supreme Court
- Rose Bird (1936–1999), chief justice of the California Supreme Court

== See also ==
- Cry of the Justice Bird, 2007 novel written by Jon Haylett
- Justice Byrd (disambiguation)
