= Josephine Byrd =

American civil rights activist

Josephine Byrd, often referred to as Josie Byrd, is an African American activist and former social service worker. The Josephine Byrd Community Services Building in Woonsocket, Rhode Island is named after her.

== Early life ==
Byrd was born into a sharecropper’s family in rural South Carolina. She moved to Woonsocket on January 1, 1960. Byrd and her sibling attended a segregated school in the south and an integrated, mostly white, school in Woonsocket. Byrd worked at the Uniroyal Footwear Company until it shut down in 1969. Using her severance pay from the company, Byrd earned her business certificate. At that time, Black Americans were not allowed to work as secretaries due to segregation. In 1974, Byrd was hired by A.T. Cross as a clerk before being promoted to a secretary and then, a quality control manager. She worked at the company for 23 years. Byrd and her family helped to found St. James Church in Woonsocket.

== Activism ==
In 2015, The Valley Breeze referred to Byrd as "one of the best known figures in Woonsocket's civil rights movement." Speaking at a ceremony honoring her civil rights work, Byrd spoke about protesting for fair housing and Black city officials in Woonsocket. She stated she advocated at the State House for Martin Luther King Day to become a holiday in Rhode Island.

== Career in social services ==
In 2000, Byrd was hired by Community Care Alliance (formerly Family Resource Community Action). According to the Woonsocket Call, "In 2003, Josie received the Paul Dempster Award for helping the homeless—the highest award offered by CCA." In 2023, she received the Appreciation Award for her decades of service. On February 16, 2023, she was honored in a Rhode Island House of Representatives bill sponsored by Christopher R. Blazejewski and Michael W. Chippendale for "20 years of dedicated social service and advocacy on behalf of the citizens in the City of Woonsocket." On June 27, 2023, Community Care Alliance renamed the building Byrd worked in at CCA to "The Josephine Byrd Community Services Building". The naming ceremony was attended by former congressman, David Cicilline.
