= Warren Bird =

American writer and researcher of megachurches

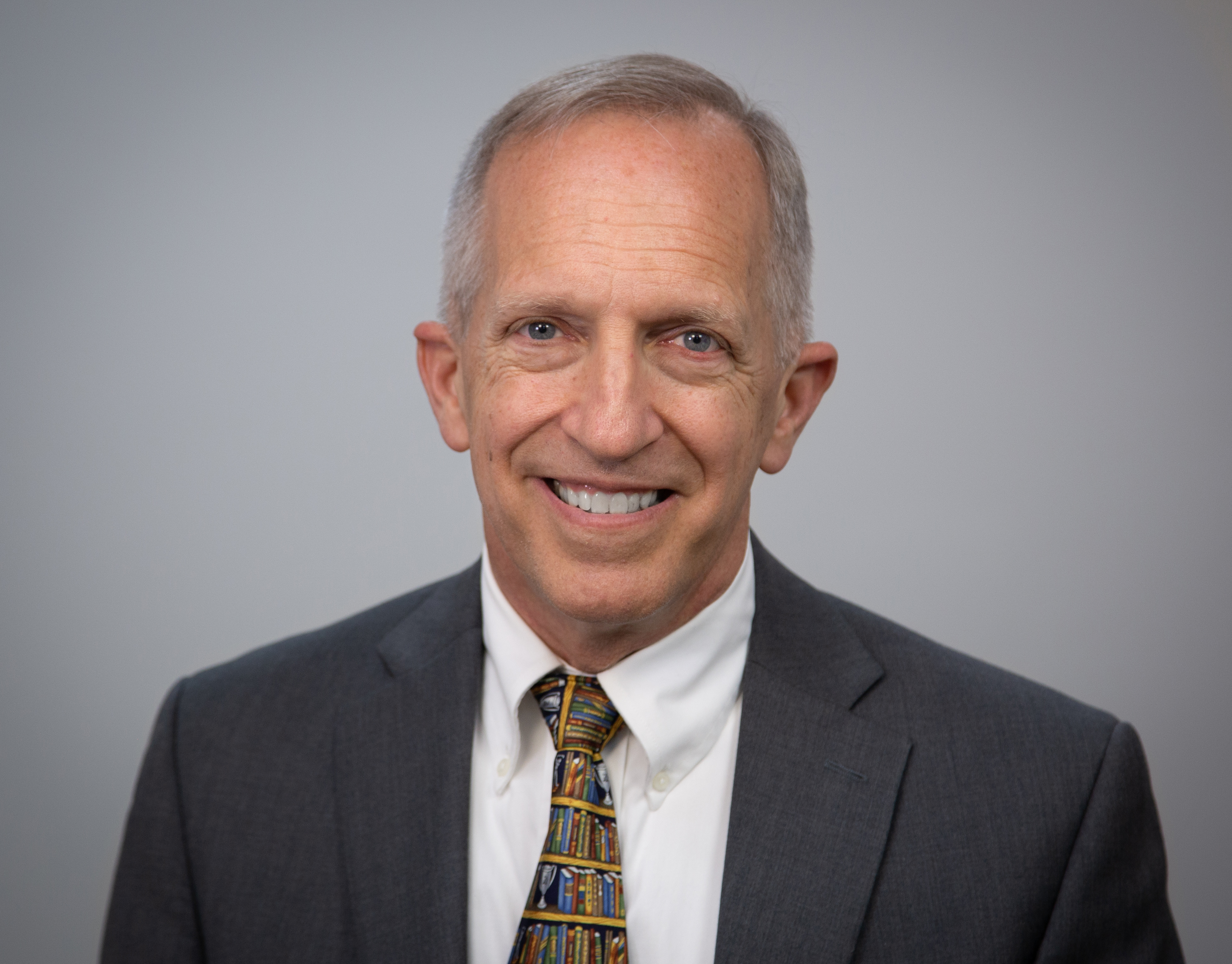
Dr. Warren Bird

Warren Bird (born 1956) is an American writer and researcher of megachurches. He has authored or co-authored 36 books on church leadership, including Emotionally Healthy Church and Prepare Your Church for the Future, which have both achieved the bestseller status of 100,000 or more units in print. He has also overseen more than 30 research reports on issues affecting large and growing churches. His research on megachurches is regularly cited in mainstream and religious media. He most recently served as Senior Vice President of Research for the Evangelical Council for Financial Accountability (ECFA).

== Life and Ministry ==
Bird was born in Atlanta, Georgia, and lived there until his college years. His formal academic training comes from Wheaton College (BA, MA), Alliance Theological Seminary (MDiv) and Fordham University (PhD). An ordained minister, he has served in several church roles including church planter and assistant pastor, including his longest tenure being for 10 years (1997–2006) on staff at Princeton Alliance Church. While pastoring, he also served as long time adjunct professor at Alliance Theological Seminary.

He has been licensed for ministry under the Christian & Missionary Alliance.

Bird is married to his college sweetheart. He and his wife, Michelle, live in a suburb of New York City.

== Research and Writing ==
In his early years, Bird served on Carl George's senior management team of the Pasadena-based Charles E. Fuller Institute of Evangelism and Church Growth where he visited, interviewed, researched, and profiled many of the largest, fastest-growing, or newest churches in North America. In subsequent years, he did similar research and development for the Canada-based Leadership Centre Willow Creek Canada, and for the Asbury Theological Seminary-based Beeson Institute for Advanced Church Leadership (1996–2006). From 2006 to 2018 Bird served as Director of Research and Intellectual Capital Development at Leadership Network.

In 2018 he became Senior Vice President of Research at the Evangelical Council for Financial Accountability (ECFA), the nation's oldest and largest nonprofit accrediting agency designed to enhance trust and certify integrity in Christ-centered churches and ministries.

He has compiled and maintained a sortable list of US and Global megachurches published by Exponential since 2010.

== Articles ==
Bird has published more than 200 magazine articles on church leadership including two cover stories for Christianity Today and the cover story for Evangelicals (the National Association of Evangelicals). He has written a “Leadership from the Global Church” column for each issue of Outreach magazine since 2014. He has also contributed collaborative chapters or sections to 8 other books. He has also written guest columns on megachurch issues such as “Not a Baby Boomer Phenomenon—Megachurches Draw Twice as Many People Under 45” in Christian Post. In 2022, he oversaw the nation's largest research to date on new churches, many of which were started by megachurches. In 2025 he co-directed the nation's largest-ever research of megachurches through the Hartford Institute for Religion Research

== Megachurch Research, US and Global ==
Bird's research has focused mainly on megachurches (Protestant congregations with 2,000 or more in-person weekly attenders). He has authored more than 25 published reports based on original research including a collection of reports on comparative trends in US megachurches. This includes a 2021 co-authored study that was the nation's largest-ever study of megachurches, “The Changing Reality in America’s Largest Churches: Megachurch Research Report.” Specialty studies include Canadian megachurches, internships/residencies in large churches, multisite megachurches, and salaries in megachurches. He also co-authored two scholarly chapters on the global megachurch phenomenon. He has contributed articles to Review of Religious Research and to the Journal for the Society for the Scientific Study of Religion.

== Books ==
Bird has authored or co-authored 35 books (listed below). Bird received the prestigious Gold Medallion Award, the top honor given by the international trade association for Christian publishers, for Emotionally Healthy Church (2004).Teams that Thrive was named Leadership Resource of the Year by Outreach magazine in 2019.

Translations of his books include Burmese, Chinese, Czech, French, German, Indonesian, Korean, Norwegian, Portuguese,^{[31]} Russian, and Spanish.

Books are listed in order of publication newest to oldest:

- Becoming a Future-Ready Church: 8 Shifts to Encourage and Empower the Next Generation of Leaders, Daniel Yang, Adelle Banks, and Warren Bird, foreword by Ryan Burge (ISBN 978-0-310-161103)
- The Resilience Factor: A Step-by-Step Guide to Catalyze an Unbreakable Team, Ryan T. Hartwig, Léonce B. Crump Jr., and Warren Bird, foreword by Tod Bolsinger (ISBN 978-1-5140-0568-2)
- Better Together: Making Church Mergers Work, expanded and updated edition, Jim Tomberlin and Warren Bird, foreword by Craig Groeschel (ISBN 1506463355, 9781506463353)
- Next: Pastoral Succession that Works, expanded and updated edition. William Vanderbloemen and Warren Bird, foreword by John Ortberg (ISBN 9781540900173)
- Liquid Church: 6 Powerful Currents to Saturate Your City for Christ, Tim Lucas and Warren Bird, foreword by Carey Nieuwhof (ISBN 9780310100102)
- Hero Maker: Five Essential Practices for Leaders to Multiply Leaders, Dave Ferguson and Warren Bird, foreword by J.D. Greear (ISBN 9780310536932)
- How To Break Growth Barriers: Revise Your Role, Release Your People and Capture Overlooked Opportunities For Your Church, Carl George and Warren Bird, foreword by Carey Nieuwhof (ISBN 978-0801092466)
- God Dreams: 12 Vision Templates for Finding and Focusing Your Church’s Future, Will Mancini and Warren Bird, foreword by Alan Hirsch (ISBN 978-1433688454)
- Teams that Thrive: Five Disciplines of Collaborative Church Leadership, Ryan Hartwig and Warren Bird, foreword by Dave Ferguson (ISBN 9780801092466, 9780830897575)
- Next: Pastoral Succession that Works, William Vanderbloemen and Warren Bird (ISBN 9780801016479)
- Wisdom from Lyle E. Schaller: The Elder Statesman of Church Leadership, Lyle Schaller and Warren Bird (ISBN 1426749104, 9781426749100)
- Better Together: Making Church Mergers Work. Jim Tomberlin and Warren Bird (ISBN 9781118131305)
- The Other 80%: Turning Your Church’s Spectators into Active Disciples, Scott Thumma and Warren Bird (ISBN 0470891297)
- Viral Churches: Helping Church Planters Become Movement Makers, Ed Stetzer and Warren Bird (ISBN 9780470550458)
- Unleashing the Word: Rediscovering the Public Reading of Scripture, Max McLean and Warren Bird (ISBN 978-0310292708
- A Multi-site Church Roadtrip: Exploring the New Normal, Geoff Surratt, Greg Ligon, and Warren Bird (ISBN 0310293944, 9780310293941)
- Innovative Transitions: How Change Can Take Your Church to the Next Level, Dale Galloway with Warren Bird (ISBN 9780834123397)
- Missing in America: Making an Eternal Difference in the World Next Door, Tom Clegg and Warren Bird (ISBN 9780764435638)
- Eleven Innovations in the Local Church: How Today’s Leaders Can Learn, Discern, and Move into the Future, Elmer Towns, Ed Stetzer and Warren Bird (ISBN 9780830737864)
- Innovation 2007: Connecting Innovators to Multiply. Leadership Network.
- The Multi-Site Church Revolution: Being One Church in Many Locations, Geoff Surratt, Greg Ligon, and Warren Bird (ISBN 0310270154)
- Momentum for Life: Sustaining Personal Health, Integrity, and Strategic Focus as a Leader, Michael Slaughter with Warren Bird and Kim Miller (ISBN 0687331919)
- Culture Shift: Transforming Your Church from the Inside Out, Robert Lewis and Wayne Cordeiro with Warren Bird (ISBN 0787975303, 9788957312551)
- The Emotionally Healthy Church: A Strategy for Discipleship That Actually Changes Lives, revised edition, by Pete Scazzero with Warren Bird (achieved bestseller status) (ISBN 0310246547)
- Starting a New Church: How to Plant a High-Impact Congregation, with accompanying DVD, by Dale Galloway with Warren Bird (ISBN 0834119854)
- UnLearning Church: Transforming Spiritual Leadership for the Emerging Church, by Michael Slaughter with Warren Bird (ISBN 0764422979)
- On-Purpose Leadership: Multiplying Your Ministry by Becoming a Leader of Leaders, by Dale Galloway with Warren Bird (ISBN 0834118823)
- Lost in America: How Your Church Can Impact the World Next Door (this book was updated and replaced by Missing in America) by Tom Clegg and Warren Bird (ISBN 076442257X)
- Into the Future: Turning Today’s Church Trends into Tomorrow’s Opportunities, by Elmer Towns and Warren Bird (ISBN 0800757254)
- Real Followers: Beyond Virtual Christianity, Michael Slaughter with Warren Bird (ISBN 0687033411)
- Nine Keys to Effective Small-Group Leadership: How Lay Leaders Can Establish Healthy Cells, Classes and Teams, by Carl George with Warren Bird (ISBN 978-0979535000)
- The Comprehensive Guide to Cassette Ministry, Johnny Berguson with Warren Bird (ISBN 1883906121)
- The Coming Church Revolution, by Carl George with Warren Bird (ISBN 0800755286)
- How to Break Growth Barriers, by Carl George with Warren Bird (ISBN 0801038537)
- Prepare Your Church for the Future, by Carl George, edited Warren Bird (achieved bestseller status) (ISBN 0800753658)
