= Splendors and Glooms =

2012 novel by Laura Amy Schlitz

Spendors and Glooms
- Author: Laura Amy Schlitz
- Language: English
- Genre: Fantasy
- Publisher: Candlewick Press
- Publication date: 2012
- Publication place: United States
- Media type: Print
- Pages: 400 pp
- ISBN: 0763669261

Splendors and Glooms is a 2012 children's novel written by Laura Amy Schlitz. The book was awarded a 2013 Newbery Honor for excellence in children's literature.

== Plot ==
The master puppeteer, Gaspare Grisini, is so expert at manipulating his stringed puppets that they appear alive. Clara Wintermute, the only child of a wealthy doctor, is spellbound by Grisini's act and invites him to entertain at her birthday party. Seeing his chance to make a fortune, Grisini accepts and makes a splendidly gaudy entrance with caravan, puppets, and his two orphaned assistants. Lizzie Rose and Parsefall are dazzled by the Wintermute home. Clara seems to have everything they lack—adoring parents, warmth, and plenty to eat. In fact, Clara's life is shadowed by grief, guilt, and secrets. When Clara vanishes that night, suspicion of kidnapping falls upon the puppeteer and, by association, Lizzie Rose and Parsefall. As they seek to puzzle out Clara's whereabouts, Lizzie and Parse uncover Grisini's criminal past and wake up to his evil intentions. Fleeing London, they find themselves caught in a trap set by Grisini's ancient rival, a witch with a deadly inheritance to shed before it is too late.

== Critical reception ==
Critics have noted Splendors and Glooms to be an "intriguing and imaginative tale" and a "not-to be-missed gothic thriller". "The language is rich and lively, and Schlitz, exhibiting the delicate control of a puppeteer of words, even pulls off comic cockney." "The plot is rich with supernatural and incredibly suspenseful elements. Fans of mystery, magic, and historical fiction will all relish this novel."

== See also ==
- 2012 in literature
- Children's literature
