= Don Byrd =

American poet

Donald J. Byrd is a poet, sound artist, and Professor of English at the State University of New York at Albany. His work is generally in the fields of literary analysis and information theory. In his lifetime, he proposes to complete one-hundred volumes that will complete a set which he refers to as The Nomad's Encyclopedia.

== Poetry ==
His chapbook, Technics of Travel, was published by Zealot-Tansy press in 1984.

His first book-length poem, Aesop's Garden, was published by North Atlantic in Plainfied, Vermont.

His second book-length poem, The Great Dimestore Centennial, was published by Station Hill press in Barrytown, New York.

Byrd was a frequent contributor to Chris Funkhouser's Descriptions of an Imaginary University under the pseudonym "Thus, Albert or Hubert."

The Poetry Hole

== Literary Analysis ==
- Charles Olson's Maximus is published by Southern Illinois University Press, and is found in over 350 libraries according to WorldCat
- The Poetics of the Common Knowledge is published by SUNY University Press, and is found in over 400 libraries according to WorldCat

== Articles ==
- Two Fables, by Don Byrd NYFA Quarterly Fall, 2001

== Audio ==
- https://archive.org/details/Don_Byrd_lecture_poets_and_poetry_June_1996_96P031

This is a lecture he gave at Naropa in 1996. It was interrupted by thunder mere moments after he refers to metaphors such as the femininity of Nature.
