= Brigitte Byrd =

French-born poet and author

- Born: Brigitte France Fourneron; 15 February 1959 (age 67); Paris, Île-de-France, France
- Occupations: Poet, Author, Professor
- Children: Camille
- Writing career
- Genre: Poetry
- Website: www.brigittebyrd.com

Brigitte France Byrd (née Fourneron; born 15 February 1959) is a French-born poet and author who now lives in the United States.

== Books ==
- Fence Above the Sea, Ahsahta Press, 2005, ISBN 0-916272-84-2
- The Dazzling Land, California Institute of Arts and Letters, 2008, ISBN 0-9714085-7-2
- Song of a Living Room, Ahsahta Press, 2009, ISBN 978-1-934103-08-1
