= Jeffry Timmons =

American professor (1941–2008)

Jeffry A. Timmons (1941–2008) was an American professor of entrepreneurship, known as a pioneer of both entrepreneurship research and education. During his career Timmons published several books and over a hundred articles and papers. He lectured on the subjects of entrepreneurship, new ventures, entrepreneurial finance and venture capital. In 2004, Timmons was named Entrepreneurship Educator of the Year by the United States Association for Small Business Entrepreneurship and is said to be the first to have used the word “entrepreneurial” in a dissertation title, in his 1971 dissertation from Harvard Business School: “Entrepreneurial and Leadership Development in an Inner City Ghetto and a Rural Depressed Area”.

== Academic career ==
Timmons received his bachelor's degree from Colgate University in upstate New York. He obtained a master's degree and Doctorate from Harvard Business School (MA) in 1971. Timmons worked at Northeastern University (MA) for 10 years, where he launched an undergraduate major in new ventures and entrepreneurship in 1973 and created an executive MBA program, which he led from 1976 to 1981. In 1982 Jeffry Timmons moved to Babson College in Wellesley (MA), to become the Paul T. Babson Professor of Entrepreneurial Studies from 1984 to 1986 followed by the Frederic C. Hamilton Professorship in Free Enterprise Development from 1986 to 1989. In the following years, Timmons held two professorships simultaneously, at Babson College and Harvard Business School, where he was the MBA Class of 1954 Visiting Professor of Business Administration from 1989 to 1995. He returned to Babson full-time in 1995 and was named the first Franklin W. Olin Distinguished Professor of Entrepreneurship. During his career, Jeffry Timmons resigned from two tenures and two endowed chairs.

=== Entrepreneurship education ===
Jeffry Timmons was known as an innovative and award-winning teacher (see above), as well as being the creator of new courses. During his career he launched several programs and sponsorships. In 1984, while at Babson College, Timmons launched the Price-Babson College Fellows Program in collaboration with the Price Institute for Entrepreneurship Studies, today known as the Babson College's Price-Babson Symposium for Entrepreneurship Educators (SEE). The program became fairly influential; Inc. Magazine, for example, wrote that it “changed the terrain of entrepreneurship education.”. The aim of the program was (and is) to improve entrepreneurship teaching and research by teaming faculty with successful entrepreneurs. Jeffry Timmons was a firm advocate of the creation of a stronger connection between real life entrepreneurs, students and scholars of entrepreneurship. He himself was not only a teacher and scholar but also an investor and businessman, who invested in a range of businesses and worked as director and advisor in several private companies and investment funds.

Jeffry Timmons’ largest contribution to entrepreneurship education, or at least the best known, is probably his book “New Venture Creation – Entrepreneurship For The 21st Century”. It was first published in 1974 (Timmons 1998), and has been released in several editions since then: the ninth being published in 2012. "We are in the midst of a silent revolution, a triumph of the creative and entrepreneurial spirit of humankind throughout the world […] I believe its impact on the 21st century will be equal or exceed that of the Industrial Revolution on the 19th and 20th." (Timmons, J 1989).

== Research ==
Jeffry Timmons’ main contribution to entrepreneurship research was on the subjects of venture capital, about which he co-authored several books. In the 1980s he and William Bygrave conducted a study called “Venture capital's role in financing innovation for economic growth” where they classified 464 venture capital firms with the aim of determining the characteristics of technology-oriented venture capitalists and entrepreneurs. They wanted to find out what factors influenced the supply of venture capital to high-tech firms and if public policy instruments could be used in this process. The result of the study was presented in a number of articles during the 1980s. Timmons and Bygrave came to the conclusion that the number of Venture capital firms and the amount of money raised grew rapidly from 1976 to 1984, due to a considerable tax cut in 1979. They also demonstrated that venture capital firms were far more heterogeneous than generally assumed and that a small percentage of the venture capital firms were responsible for a large part of the investment in highly innovative technological ventures. According to Timmons and Bygrave (1986), these venture capital firms were highly skilled, experienced, and specialized in technology. This expertise was important for the entrepreneurs behind the new ventures, who actively sought out these specialized venture capitalists, whose expertise and contacts they actually valued more highly than the investments.
