= James Hixon Van Sickle =

American educator (1852–1926)

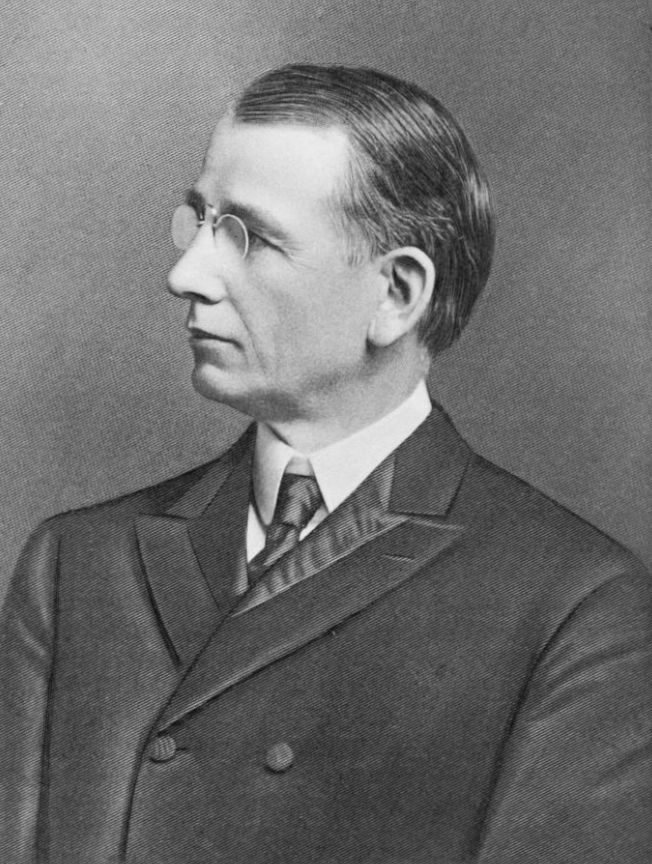
- Van Sickle in 1907 publication
- Born: October 24, 1852; Livonia, New York, U.S.
- Died: February 12, 1926 (aged 73); Miami, Florida, U.S.
- Resting place: Woodlawn Park Cemetery
- Education: Williams College
- Alma mater: University of Colorado Boulder (BA, MA)
- Occupation: Educator
- Spouse: Caroline Valentine (m. 1883)
- Children: 4

James Hixon Van Sickle (October 24, 1852 – February 12, 1926) was an American educator. He worked as superintendent of schools in Denver, Colorado, Baltimore, Maryland, and Springfield, Massachusetts.

== Early life ==
James Hixon Van Sickle was born on October 24, 1852, in south Livonia, New York. He graduated from the New York State Normal School at Albany in 1873. He studied at Williams College for a year in 1876. He later graduated from the University of Colorado Boulder in 1896 with a Bachelor of Arts and in 1898 with a Master of Arts. He was a member of Phi Beta Kappa.

== Career ==
After graduating, Van Sickle taught and worked as a principal of grade schools in New Providence, New Jersey, Caledonia, New York, and Cook Academy in Havana, New York. He also taught at a college preparatory academy in New York. Van Sickle moved to Denver, Colorado. He worked as principal of a grammar school for eight years and then worked as superintendent of schools of the north side schools in Denver for nine years. He gave lectures during the summer session at Chicago, Yale and Cornell on school administration.

In 1909, Van Sickle worked as director of courses in school administration during school school at the University of Tennessee in Knoxville, Tennessee. Van Sickle served as the fifth superintendent of Baltimore schools from July 1, 1900, to July 1911. In 1911, he was removed from his position following political pressure from Mayor James H. Preston. His time as superintendent in Baltimore is noted as providing more uniformity to the school system and improving school administration and staffing. He was elected as superintendent of schools in Springfield, Massachusetts, replacing Wilbur F. Gordy. He started this position on September 1, 1911.

Van Sickle served as president of the Middle States Council for Social Studies from 1904 to 1905. Van Sickle served as president of the Southern Educational Association in 1909. He was a member of the American School Peace League from 1908 to 1913. He wrote several papers on educational subjects and was the editor of several textbooks used in public schools.

== Personal life ==
Van Sickle married Caroline Valentine of New Providence on August 1, 1883. They had two daughters and two sons, Mrs. John White, Helen, John B. and Schuyler.

Later in life, Van Sickle lived with his wife in Coral Gables, Florida. Van Sickle died on February 12, 1926, while visiting former Baltimore school superintendent Henry S. West in Miami, Florida. He was buried at Woodlawn Park Cemetery.

== Awards and legacy ==
Van Sickle received an honorary PhD at the University at Albany (State University of New York), in 1905.

The Park School of Baltimore cites the ousting of Van Sickle in 1911 as superintendent of schools in Baltimore as a cause for the founding of the school. According to the Baltimore Bulletin of Education, Van Sickle should be attributed for spearheading the creation of a department of education at Johns Hopkins University.
