= Karl H. Vesper =

American scholar and professor emeritus

Karl Hampton Vesper (born 1932) is an American scholar and professor emeritus of management, mechanical engineering and marine studies at the University of Washington (WA). Vesper is known as a pioneer in the field of entrepreneurship research and education. He has launched several entrepreneurship courses and programs, and he has been involved in organizing some of the first conferences on entrepreneurship in the US.

== Early life ==
Vesper was born in San Marino, California, on August 12, 1932, but he grew up mostly in Santa Monica. His father was born in San Diego, California, and his mother in Niagara Falls, Canada, but she immigrated to the US and acquired citizenship through the legal naturalization process.

== Education ==
Vesper went to college at Stanford University, CA, and received a Bachelor of Science in mechanical engineering in 1955. He applied, and got accepted, to three different grad schools: Stanford, Caltech and MIT (Massachusetts Institute for Technology), choose the latter, and in September that year Vesper moved to Boston. He did not, however, stay at MIT but dropped out and enrolled in the US Air Force as a mechanical engineer at the Flight Test Center at Edwards Air Force Base in California. After completing his active military service, Vesper moved back to Boston but this time he had a career in Management consulting in mind, and therefore went to Harvard Business School. In 1960 he received an MBA (Master of Business Administration) from Harvard University, Cambridge, MA.

== Academic career ==
From there on Vesper's academic career followed two different paths simultaneously. One path in engineering, which involved pioneering the use of Harvard Business School Style cases focused on technical engineering problems rather than business problems for teaching engineering, the other one in entrepreneurship, where his research focused on education and the creation of new business ventures. From 1960 to 1961, Vesper worked at Harvard Business School as a research assistant writing cases and teaching a Small Manufacturing Enterprises Course. After that he left Harvard for a time and worked as an assistant to the president of a high-performance electromotive products company in Anaheim, CA, and as business manager of a La Jolla oceanographic consulting company for which he helped raise venture capital from Silicon Valley.

In 1962, Vesper returned to Harvard to work as research associate and teacher. From 1963 to 1969 he was director of case development at Stanford University School of Engineering, and research associate and lecturer in mechanical engineering, concerned with a new program introducing case methods in engineering education. In 1966, Vesper received a Master of Science in mechanical engineering from Stanford University, and three years later he took his PhD in engineering at Stanford. The same year, he became professor of management, mechanical engineering and marine studies at the University of Washington. A post he held until he retired in 2007. Vesper has also held several endowed professorships as a visitor at Baylor University (Texas) in 1980, Babson College (Massachusetts), 1981, and the University of Calgary in 1987. In 1989 he was a visiting professor at Trinity College, Dublin, Ireland as a Fulbright Distinguished Lecturer. A few years later, in 2001, Vesper held the position of visiting professor in Bioengineering at the University of California, San Diego, where he helped develop new graduate courses for the Jacobs School of Engineering. In 2007 he was visiting professor of entrepreneurship at the University of Hawaii and three years later he held the position of Regents Endowed Chair visiting professor at Texas Tech University.

== Research ==
During his academic career, Vesper focused mainly on entrepreneurship education and research on the creation of new business ventures. He has published over 140 articles, book chapters and books. In 1980 he published the book New Venture Strategies and in 1982 he co-edited the book Encyclopedia of Entrepreneurship, with Calvin A. Kent and Donald L. Sexton. In the book they offered a summarized picture of the field of entrepreneurship research at the time.

In 1988, Vesper published an article in the Journal of Business Venturing. The article was titled “Entrepreneurial Academics – How Can We Tell When the Field is Getting Somewhere?” and in it Vesper concluded that the field of entrepreneurship research was on the rise, but the quality, quantity and direction of that research needed to be assessed. Vesper argues that both entrepreneurship research and education would have much to gain from being more experimental. Vesper is known for his substantial contributions to the organizing of the field of entrepreneurship research. In 1974, at the Academy of Management (AOM) meeting, Vesper organized a meeting for those interested in entrepreneurship; the meeting resulted in the forming of an interest group which later (1987) became the Entrepreneurship Division of AOM. Vesper was also involved in one of the first academic conferences on entrepreneurship in the US, at the Center for Venture Management at Purdue University in 1970. A decade later, he and John Hornaday organized the first Babson Research Conference, today one of the leading conferences on entrepreneurship in the world.

== Books ==
- Vesper, Karl H. (1980) New Venture Strategies. Englewood Cliffs: Prentice-Hall.
- Kent, Calvin A., Sexton, Donald L. & Vesper, Karl H. (ed.) (1982) Encyclopedia of Entrepreneurship. Englewood Cliffs: Prentice-Hall.
- Vesper, Karl H. (1985) Entrepreneurship Education. Wellesley: Babson Center for Entrepreneurship Studies.
- Vesper, Karl H. (1993) New Venture Mechanics. Englewood Cliffs: Prentice-Hall.
- Larson, Paul & Vesper, Karl H. (1993) The Washington Entrepreneur's Guide. Seattle: University Press.
- Vesper, Karl H. (1994) New Venture Experience. Seattle: Vector Books.
