= Flossie M. Byrd =

African American home economist

- Born: Flossie Marian Byrd; August 8, 1927; Sarasota, Florida, U.S.
- Died: March 17, 2020 (aged 92); Monticello, Florida
- Occupation: Educator

Academic background
- Education: Florida A&M University; Pennsylvania State University; Cornell University
- Thesis: An exploratory study of the early adolescents' understanding of certain concepts in child development

Academic work
- Discipline: Home Economics
- Institutions: Prairie View A&M University; Florida A&M University

Flossie M. Byrd (August 8, 1927 – March 17, 2020) was a home economist, family and consumer services scientist, educator, and the first provost and vice president for academic affairs at the public historically black university (HBCU), Prairie View A&M University (PVAMU) in Prairie View, Texas. She taught in Florida public high schools and at Florida A&M University in Tallahassee, Florida before moving to PVAMU. She earned a PhD in Home Economics Education with minors in child development and educational psychology and measurement from Cornell University in 1963. Her research interests included concept formation, family membership disability, and family resource management.

== Early life ==
Byrd was born in Sarasota, Florida and was the oldest of 17 children. She graduated valedictorian of Howard Academy High School in Monticello, Florida in 1944 and earned her Bachelor of Science degree in home economics from Florida A&M University (FAMU), graduating magna cum laude in 1948. She earned her Master of Education degree in home economics education from Pennsylvania State University in 1954, and her PhD in Home Economics Education with minors in child development and educational psychology and measurement from Cornell University in 1963. Her PhD thesis was titled, "An exploratory study of the early adolescents' understanding of certain concepts in child development."

== Career ==
Byrd started her career in 1948 teaching home economics in Florida public high schools and five years at FAMU. She then moved to Prairie View A&M University (PVAMU), where she served as the dean of the College of Home Economics for 23 years. In 1991 she was appointed vice president for academic affairs at PVAMU. Her appointment title was changed to provost and vice president for academic affairs in 1993. She was the first person at the university to be appointed provost. She retired in 1994 and returned to Florida, settling in Monticello, Florida, where she lived until her death in 2020.

Upon her retirement, she established the Flossie M. Byrd Endowed Fellowship at PVAMU for students studying agriculture and human sciences. She also published two books after retiring: Education in Jefferson County in Historical Perspective and Echoes of a Quieter Time.

=== Honors and awards ===
Byrd has won several awards and titles for her work. In 1990, she received the Distinguished Service Award from the American Home Economics Association (now the American Association of Family and Consumer Sciences). She also held the titles of president of the National Council of Administrators of Home Economics (1971–1972), president of the Association of Administrators of Home Economics (1981–83), and vice president for professional standards of the American Home Economics Association (1985–1987). She was also a distinguished visiting professor in home economics at Oregon State University, received the Florida A&M University distinguished alumna award, and was inducted into the FAMU Gallery of Distinction for Agriculture and Home Economics graduates. She is also a Golden Life Member of Delta Sigma Theta sorority. After retirement, she served as historian, secretary and chair, and on the nominating committee for the Florida Retired Educators Association (FREA); in 1998 she was named the FREA Volunteer of the Year.

== Publications ==
- Byrd, Flossie Marian (1963). An exploratory study of the early adolescents' understanding of certain concepts in child development. OCLC 55166278. Cornell University. Dissertation.
- Taft, Earl A.; Byrd, Flossie M. (1972). Black Families Under Stress: A Metropolitan-Nonmetropolitan Comparison of Individual and Family Disability in a Southern Area (PDF). Distributed by ERIC Clearinghouse.
- Byrd, Flossie M; Hall, Katharine Burnette (1972). The role of home economics in family planning, Philippines: report of a country survey, July 5-15, 1972. American Home Economics Association. OCLC 7280696.
- Noel, Elizabeth N.; Byrd, Flossie M. (1974). Disability : an annotated bibliography. Prairie View, TX: Prairie View A & M University. OCLC 5380625.
- Byrd, Flossie M; Jefferson County Retired Educators Association (1997). Education in Jefferson County, Florida in historical perspective. publisher not identified. OCLC 52166792.
