= Larry Bird (Canadian football) =

Canadian football player

No. 42
- Positions: Center, Guard

Personal information
- Born: October 17, 1945 (age 81); Big River, Saskatchewan, Canada
- Listed height: 6 ft 1 in (1.85 m)
- Listed weight: 230 lb (104 kg)

Career information
- College: Western Ontario

Career history
- 1967 1971–1978: Edmonton Eskimos; Saskatchewan Roughriders

Larry Bird (born October 17, 1945) is a Canadian former professional football player who was an offensive lineman for nine seasons in the Canadian Football League (CFL), primarily for the Saskatchewan Roughriders, from 1967 through 1978.

Bird was born in Big River, Saskatchewan, and did not know about football until moving to Viking, Alberta, at age 13. He played two years of junior football with the Edmonton Huskies. He joined the University of Alberta's Golden Bears afterwards, earning all-star honors as a guard. Bird was drafted by the Edmonton Eskimos, but instead completed his education at the University of Western Ontario. He played two season with their Mustangs football team, and was named their most valuable player in 1969.

Bird signed with the Saskatchewan Roughriders in 1970. He was moved to centre in Game 5 of 1971. Standing at 6 feet 1 inch (1.85 m) and 230 pounds (100 kg), he continued to play undersized at the position. He was inducted into the Roughriders Plaza of Honor in 2002.
