= S. Elizabeth Bird =

British-American anthropologist

S. Elizabeth Bird is a British-American anthropologist and academic known for her work on media, popular culture, folklore, and memory, with a special interest in the Nigerian Civil War. Until her retirement, she was a professor of anthropology at the University of South Florida. Since retiring, she has focused on personal writing, publishing mainly in literary magazines. She curates her academic and creative writing on her personal website.

== Education ==
Bird received a Bachelor of Arts in anthropology from Durham University, a Master of Arts in folk life studies from the University of Leeds, a Master of Arts in journalism and mass communication from the University of Iowa, and a Doctor of Philosophy from the University of Strathclyde.

== Career ==
Bird began her U.S. academic career as a teaching assistant in Journalism and adjunct professor in Anthropology at the University of Iowa, where she started to examine the intersection of anthropology and media. In 1991, she joined the University of Minnesota Duluth as an assistant professor of anthropology and interdisciplinary studies, remaining there until 1996. That year, she joined the University of South Florida as a professor, serving a Department Chair and Director of the USF Humanities Institute. She retired in 2018 and was named Professor Emerita. See her USF faculty page, and Google Scholar profile at: https://scholar.google.com/citations?user=0wLZCOYAAAAJ&hl=en&oi=ao

=== Media anthropology ===
Bird's research in media and communication explored how people use stories, media, and everyday cultural practices to construct meaning and identity. Her first book, a cultural study of American supermarket tabloids, employed feminist and ethnographic approaches to understand the content and readers of these publications. Since then, she has written extensively on news, journalism, and popular culture, with a particular focus on ethnographic studies of audiences and the construction of race and gender in media. Her book, The Audience in Every Day Life,(2003) brings much of that work together, while highlighting innovative approaches to qualitative audience studies. With over 100 published articles and chapters, she is recognized for bridging anthropology with media and cultural studies, helping explain how everyday narratives—like news stories or local legends—shape how people understand the world around them. For a discussion of her work, see Andy Ruddock, Exploring Media Research, Sage 2017.

=== Nigerian Civil War ===
Bird's work in Nigeria has focused on the 1967 Asaba Massacre, which happened in the early months of the Nigerian Civil War over the secession of Biafra. With colleague Fraser Ottanelli, Bird conducted research with survivors of the massacres, and in archives in the United Kingdom, United States, and Nigeria. Bird and Ottanelli published the edited collection The Performance of Memory as Transitional Justice in 2015, followed by The Asaba Massacre in 2017. Further details of the research are curated through the Asaba Memorial Project, which Bird maintains. The Asaba work continues her exploration of media in its analysis of the role of new media in re-energizing the community's efforts to memorialize the atrocity, while also analyzing how people actively remember and reinterpret historical events. Bird also worked with Nigerian-British author Rosina Umelo, introducing and editing Umelo's wartime account of living in Biafra, Surviving Biafra: A Nigerwife's Story, in 2018.

== Awards ==
- Outstanding Book: Gustavus Myers Center for the Study of Human Rights in America, 1997, for Dressing in Feathers.
- Outstanding Book Award: International Communication Association, 2004, for The Audience in Everyday Life.]
- Visiting Scholar, Annenberg School for Communication, University of Pennsylvania, 2007.
- Communication Research as Open Field Award, International Communication Association, 2009.
- Fellow: International Communication Association, inducted 2014.
- Collaborative Fellowship: American Council of Learned Societies, 2015-2017.
- Oral History Association Book Award, 2018, for The Asaba Massacre: Trauma, Memory and the Nigerian Civil War.

== Books ==
- Bird, S. Elizabeth (1992). For Enquiring Minds: A Cultural Study of Supermarket Tabloids. Knoxville: University of Tennessee Press.
- Bird, S. Elizabeth, ed. (1996). Dressing in Feathers: The Construction of the Indian in American Popular Culture. Boulder: Westview Press/Harper Collins.
- Bird, S. Elizabeth (2003). The Audience in Everyday Life: Living in a Media World. New York: Routledge.
- Bird, S. Elizabeth, ed. (2010). The Anthropology of News and Journalism: Global perspectives. Bloomington: Indiana University Press.
- Bird, S. Elizabeth; Ottanelli, Fraser, eds. (2015). The Performance of Memory as Transitional Justice. Cambridge/Mortsel: Intersentia.
- Bird, S. Elizabeth; Ottanelli, Fraser (2017). The Asaba Massacre: Trauma, Memory, and the Nigerian Civil War. Cambridge: Cambridge University Press.
- Bird, S. Elizabeth; Umelo, Rosina (2018). Surviving Biafra: A Nigerwife's Story. London: Hurst.
