= Cyril Handley Bird =

British civil servant (1896–1969)

Sir Cyril Handley Bird, CBE (3 June 1896 – 27 March 1969) was a British businessman and politician. He served on the Uganda Legislative Council from 1947 to 1955, before being appointed the first Minister of Commerce and Works for Uganda (1955 to 1958) under that country's first ministerial system.

== Career ==
Cyril Handley Bird was born on 3 June 1896, the son of Herbert Handley Bird; the son of an Anglican priest, Herbert (known as Handley Bird) was a missionary who first embarked from Bristol on a failed venture to Canada in the early 1880s, but in 1888 travelled to India, where he was joined by his fiancée and later wife Marion née Miller; his career there was much more successful and he succeeded in converting innumerable Indians before his death in Bombay in 1938.

Cyril Handley Bird attended St Lawrence College before studying at the University of Bristol. He served with the British Red Cross Society during the First World War, working in France. He then went to Africa, operating as businessman in Nigeria from 1920, and then across East Africa for nearly 30 years from 1924. He served as president of the Ugandan Chamber of Commerce from 1942 to 1946, and then as a member of the Uganda Electricity Board from 1948 to 1955; Bird had been elected to the Uganda Legislative Council in 1947 and also served until 1955, when he was appointed Minister of Commerce and Works that August. He left the government in October 1958, and was knighted that year (having been appointed a Commander of the Order of the British Empire three years prior). He had also been an honorary consul for Belgium from 1937 until 1955.

Sir Cyril died on 27 March 1969, leaving a widow, Signa Elaine Handley née Garside and one daughter. He was described in The Times as a "respected", "shrewd businessman of great integrity".

== Archives ==
- "Papers of Sir Cyril Handley Bird", Bodleian Library, University of Oxford (reference number GB 0162 MSS.Afr.s.1674). 1 box of papers, 1943–1959.
