= Robert Byrd (architect) =

American architect (1904–1978)

- Born: October 11, 1904; Tennessee
- Died: May 20, 1978 (aged 73); Los Angeles County, California
- Occupation: Architect
- Practice: Associated architectural firm[s]
- Buildings: 10050 Cielo Drive, Benedict Canyon, Los Angeles
- Projects: Robert Taylor Ranch
- Design: 1260 Lago Vista Place

Robert Lee Byrd (October 11, 1904 – May 20, 1978) was an architect in Los Angeles, California. Most of his buildings and residences are from the 1920s to the 1970s. In his later years he worked together with his architect son Gary Byrd. He was known for his modern "indoor–outdoor" style – along with his use of bird houses embedded in the actual structure. He also designed and built furniture.

== Buildings ==
- 10050 Cielo Drive, Benedict Canyon, Los Angeles, CA (1941)
- 10048 Cielo Drive, Benedict Canyon, Los Angeles, CA
- Robert Taylor Ranch, Brentwood, Los Angeles, CA
- 1260 Lago Vista Place, Los Angeles, CA ()
- The Tree House, Laurel Canyon Blvd. and Lookout Mountain Ave., Los Angeles, CA
- 12417 Mulholland Dr, Beverly Hills, CA 90210
- 2274 Ben Lomond Drive, Los Angeles CA (1938) - cottage in Los Feliz
- 8266 Hollywood Blvd, Los Angeles CA
- 8263 Hollywood Blvd, Los Angeles CA
- 8277 Hollywood Blvd, Los Angeles CA
- 8288 Hollywood Blvd, Los Angeles CA
- 12048 Laurel Terrace Drive, Los Angeles CA (12048 Laurel Terrace Drive)
- 3798 Government Blvd, Mobile, AL (circa 1958) (not a Byrd house)
- 3401 N Ann Arbor Ave Oklahoma City, OK 73122
- 4546 White Oak Ave, Encino, CA 913169()
- 4535 Encino Ave., Encino, CA 91316 ()
- 3658 Loadstone Drive, Sherman Oaks, CA 91403 ()
- 10756 Rochester Ave., Los Angeles, CA 90024 ()
- 1426 Summitridge Dr., Beverly Hills, CA ()
- 3370 Tareco Drive, Los Angeles, CA 90068
- 300 Durham Drive, Mobile, AL 36606
- 2419 Astral Drive, Los Angeles CA
- 10576 Rocca Way Los Angeles 90077
- 4251 Hazeltine Ave, Sherman Oaks, CA 91423
- 1630 Haslam Terrace, Los Angeles, CA 90069
