= Robert Byrd (artist) =

American children's book illustrator

Robert John Byrd (born January 11, 1942) is an American author and illustrator from Haddonfield, New Jersey.

Byrd was born in Atlantic City, New Jersey. Following high school, Byrd joined the U.S. Navy in 1961, leaving in 1962 to attend Trenton Junior College. After a year at Trenton, he switched to study at the Philadelphia College of Art (later called the University of the Arts).

Byrd wrote and illustrated five picture books including Leonardo, Beautiful Dreamer, which chronicles thematically the life and work of Leonardo da Vinci.

"I always drew as a child, but oddly enough never thought of it as a profession, or what you did when you grew up... Out of all my creative work, illustrating children's books gives me the greatest satisfaction. It is my 'fine art'. It keeps me going aesthetically. The books have a permanence and a quality of something meaningful."

He has also illustrated at least sixteen books for other authors, including Jack Stokes, Robert Kraus, Bruce Kraus, Laura Amy Schlitz, Kathleen Krull, Marilyn Jager Adams, and Paula Fox.

His work has been exhibited by the Society of Illustrators, the Philadelphia Art Alliance, and The Rosenfeld Gallery, in Philadelphia. He has also been exhibited in various locations within Switzerland, Italy, and Illinois. His work is a part of permanent collections at the Free Library of Philadelphia and the Philadelphia College of Art.

He has won the Golden Kite Award, and received other accolades from the Children's Book Council and the Society of Illustrators.

Robert is a member of the Graphic Artists Guild, Philadelphia Children's Reading Round Table, and the Philadelphia College of Art Alumni Association. And he teaches Children's Book Illustration at the University of the Arts, and Moore College of Art and Design, in Philadelphia.
