= Robert L. Byrd =

American politician and lobbyist

Robert Lee Byrd is a lobbyist and former Democratic state representative from Delaware. His 2019 memoir is titled Byrd of Legislative Hall.
