= Jeffrey J. Byrd =

American academic

Jeffrey J. Byrd is one of the contributing writers for The Complete Idiot's Guide to Microbiology. He was a commissioner for the Middle States Commission on Higher Education and was the editor-in-chief of the Journal of Microbiology and Biology Education, formerly called Microbiology Education and published by the American Society for Microbiology. He is a professor emeritus of Biology at St. Mary's College of Maryland.
