= Cuthbert Hilton Golding-Bird =

English surgeon

Golding-Bird

Cuthbert Hilton Golding-Bird (7 July 1848–16 March 1939) was an English surgeon at Guy's Hospital, fellow of the Royal College of Surgeons, and lecturer to medical students. He was skilled in histology, invented a dilator for use in tracheotomies, and pioneered a new gastroenterological surgical procedure.

Outside of medicine, Golding-Bird was known as a collector of clocks. He also published books on local archaeology.

== Early life, education, and family ==
Golding-Bird was born in Pentonville, London on 7 July 1848. He was the fourth child of Golding Bird, a Fellow of the Royal College of Physicians and pioneer of electrotherapy. Golding-Bird's mother, Mary, instituted the Golding Bird Gold Medal and Scholarship for sanitary science (later renamed for bacteriology). He attended Tonbridge School 1856–1862 and then King's College London. He obtained a BA at the University of London in 1867.

In 1870, Golding-Bird married Florence Marion, daughter of another surgeon, John Baber. Florence died in 1919. The couple had no children. Golding-Bird died of angina with asthma on 6 March 1939 at Pitfield, near Meopham, Kent, aged 90.

== Career ==
Golding-Bird started at Guy's Hospital Medical School in 1868. He won multiple prizes as a student. After qualifying, he went on a post-graduate course in Paris. Back at Guy's, he was initially a demonstrator (Note: A demonstrator is an academic rank used in some educational institutions. The status of a demonstrator is a step down from lecturer and is equivalent to assistant lecturer.) of anatomy. In 1875 he was appointed assistant surgeon and demonstrator of physiology under Philip Pye-Smith, who he succeeded in 1883. He remained at Guy's until his retirement in 1908. He retired to Meopham, but continued to serve Guy's as consulting surgeon. In retirement, he was also surgeon to the Gravesend Hospital and the Royal Deaf and Dumb School, (Note: The Royal Deaf and Dumb School in latter years was known as the Royal School for Deaf Children (History of Place). See also Margate § Education.) Margate.

Golding-Bird was a fellow of the Royal College of Surgeons from 1874. He served them as examiner in various capacities from 1884 to 1913. He was a member of the Physiological Society from 1880.

== Surgery ==
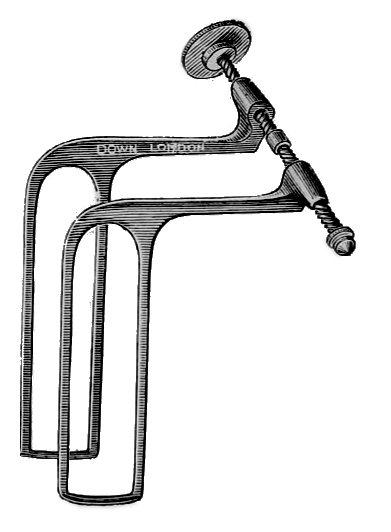
Golding-Bird's trachea dilator

Golding-Bird was known for his skill in microanatomy (histology). He worked by hand with an ordinary razor, as was then the custom. Drawings of his sections of the retina appeared in Quain's Anatomy. Golding-Bird invented a dilator for use in tracheotomies. The dilator was an alternative to the previous practice of holding the incision open with stitches of silk thread. Another innovative procedure of which Golding-Bird was one of the pioneers was the treatment of ulcerative colitis by making an incision in the appendix through which the large intestine could be flushed.

Golding-Bird was young looking, which sometimes caused patients to doubt his experience. One woman, who needed a leg amputation, requested that an older-looking, but unknown to her, more junior surgeon should do the work.

== Awards ==
- Gold medal in forensic medicine at the MB examination 1873

== Recreation ==
Golding-Bird was a collector of clocks, of which he had a great many at Meopham. He enjoyed disassembling and reassembling them. He was interested in local archaeology and wrote two books on the history of Meopham, the village where he retired, one of which is still in print. He also wrote a history of the United Hospitals Club. He was also a good photographer and keen gardener.

== Selected publications ==
- "Mechanical treatment of croupous membrane after tracheotomy—trachea dilator", The Retrospect of Medicine, vol. 85, pp. 187–190, 1882.
- An Account of the United Hospitals' Club form its Foundation, Feb, 14th, 1828, to its Diamond Jubilee, Feb. 13th, 1903, Ash, 1904, OCLC 747288471.
- The Story of Old Meopham, London: Williams & Norgate, 1934 OCLC 558148226 (first published 1918).
- History of Meopham, Fonthill Media, 2012 ISBN 1781551243 (first published 1934).

== Bibliography ==
- Bramer, Dawn, "Meopham residents of renown", Meopham Parish Council, accessed and archived 2 December 2018.
- Clegg, W. T., Tracheotomy in an infant four days old", British Medical Journal, vol. 1, pp. 68–69, January 1892.
- O'Connor, W. J., Founders of British Physiology, Manchester University Press, 1988 ISBN 0719025370.
- Treves, Frederick, A Manual of Surgery, vol. 2, New York: Cassell, 1886.
- "Bird, Golding (1814–1854) and Bird, Cuthbert Hilton Golding- (1848–1939)", AIM25, accessed and archived 2 December 2018.
- "Obituary: C. H. Golding-Bird, MB, FRCS", British Medical Journal, vol. 1, no. 4080, pp. 590–591, 18 March 1939.
- "The Royal School for Deaf Children", History of Place, accessed and archived 2 December 2018.
- "Golding-Bird, Cuthbert Hilton (1848–1939)", Plarr's Lives of the Fellows Online, Royal College of Surgeons, 7 March 2008, accessed and archived 26 April 2018.
- "Mr. C. H. Golding-Bird: late consulting surgeon to Guy's Hospital", The Times, p. 16, 7 March 1939.
