= Geoff Byrd =

American musician (born 1970)

Geoff Byrd (born in Portland, Oregon on August 27, 1970) is an American musician, singer, songwriter, producer, and author.

== Career ==
Byrd has written songs with John Oates, Jed Leiber, Kansas, Billy Morrison, Samantha Landrum, and many others. He's had over 1,000 placements of his original songs on film and TV. He also toured with Hall and Oates as the opening act for 50 shows in the U.S. and Canada. Was the opening act for Stevie Wonder. Shared the stage with Billy Gibbons, T Bone Wolk and many others. He is also a film maker and editor, making music videos, doc shorts and full length documentary films.

== Discography ==
- Vulnerable (2000)
- Candy Shell (2003)
- Shrinking Violets (2005)
- Featurette (2007)
- X-Ray Vision (2009)
- Lux (2010)
- Deep Black (2018)
- Best Of Geoff Byrd (2018)
