= Geologists Island =

Island in Antarctica

- Location within Antarctica

Geography
- Location: Antarctica
- Coordinates: 62°13′11″S 58°56′36″W

Administration
- Administered under the Antarctic Treaty System

Demographics
- Population: Uninhabited

Geologists Island is an island, 0.5 kilometres (0.25 nmi) long, lying south of Ardley Island in the entrance of Hydrographers Cove, Fildes Peninsula, King George Island, in the South Shetland Islands. The approved name is a translation of the Russian "Ostrov Geologov" (geologists' island), applied in 1968 following Soviet Antarctic Expedition surveys from Bellingshausen Station.

== See also ==
- List of antarctic and sub-antarctic islands
