= Station Creek =

Stream in Antarctica

Station Creek (62°11′52″S 58°57′47″W) is a creek that flows southeast from Lake Kitezh into Ardley Cove, Fildes Peninsula, King George Island. The name derives from the proximity of the Soviet Antarctic Expedition Bellingshausen Station, erected 1968, which is located just east of the creek. The approved name, Station Creek, is a translation of the Russian "Ruch'ye Statsionnyy."
