= Mary Baker =

Mary Baker may refer to:

- Mary Baker (painter) (fl. 1842–1856), English painter
- Bonnie Baker (baseball) (Mary Geraldine Baker, 1918–2003), American baseball player
- Mary Baker Eddy (1821–1910), born Mary Baker, founder of Christian Science
- Mary Landon Baker (1901–1961), American socialite and heiress famous for her romantic life
- Princess Caraboo (1791–1864), English impostor
- Mary E. Baker (1923–1995), African-American community activist
- Mary Baker McQuesten (1849–1934), born Mary Jane Baker, activist
- Mary Ann Baker (1831–1921), American composer and singer
- Mary Lou Baker (1914–1965), member of the Florida House of Representatives and women's rights activist
