= Alfred Baker =

Alfred Baker may refer to:

- Alfred Baker (academic) (1848–1942), Canadian academic
- Alfred Baker (politician) (1870–1943), English politician and solicitor
- Alfred Joseph Baker (1846–1900), played for England in England v Scotland representative matches (1870–1872)
- Alfred L. Baker (financer), father of Mary Landon Baker
- Alf Baker (1898–1955), English footballer with Arsenal and England
- Brownie Baker (1889–1939), Canadian professional ice hockey player

== See also ==
- Al Baker (disambiguation)
