= Thomas Molyneux =

Thomas or Tom Molyneux (sometimes Molineux or Molineaux) may refer to:

- Thomas Molyneux (statesman) (1531–1597), French-born statesman in Ireland
- Sir Thomas Molyneux, 1st Baronet, (1661–1733), Irish physician
- Thomas Molineux (luthier) (c. 1700–1757), Irish luthier
- Thomas Molineux (stenographer) (1759–1850), English stenographer
- Tom Molineaux (1784–1818), African bare-knuckle boxer
- Tom Molyneux (1890–1955), Canadian ice hockey player

== See also ==
Tim Molyneux (born 1969), American actor, singer, writer, director and producer
