= Clement Hill =

Clement Hill may refer to:

== People ==
- Clem Hill (1877–1945), Australian cricketer
- Clement Hill (cricketer, born 1904) (1904–1988), Australian cricketer
- Clement Delves Hill (1781–1845), British Army officer of the Napoleonic era
- Clement S. Hill (1813–1892), U.S. representative from Kentucky
- Sir Clement Lloyd Hill (1845–1913), British member of parliament for Shrewsbury, 1906–1913
  - SS Clement Hill, a cargo and passenger Lake Victoria ferry in East Africa

== Places ==
- Clement Hill (Antarctica)
- Clements Hills AVA, California wine region in San Joaquin County
