= Hearts of Stone (Stoneground album) =

Studio album by Stoneground
- Released: 1978
- Recorded: Record Plant, Sausalito, California
- Genre: Pop rock, blues rock
- Length: 38:42
- Label: Warner Bros.
- Producer: Bob Gaudio

Stoneground chronology
Flat Out (1976)	Hearts of Stone (1978)	Play It Loud (1980)

Hearts of Stone is the fifth studio album by American rock band Stoneground, released in 1978 on Warner Bros. Produced by Bob Gaudio, it marked Stoneground's return to a major label, having released their previous album, Flat Out (1976), on their own label. "Prove It" was released as the first single from Hearts of Stone.

== Background and recording ==
Following the 1973 release of Stoneground 3, frontman Sal Valentino quit to start his own band. Cory Lerios and Steve Price left and formed a new group, Pablo Cruise. Five other band members also departed, leaving only founding member Tim Barnes and vocalist Annie Sampson. They reformed Stoneground with new additions Jo Baker (vocals), Terry Davis (guitars, vocals), Fred Webb (keyboards, vocals) and Sammy Piazza (drums). Without the backing of a major label, the band self-released an album, Flat Out, in 1976 and underwent a 250-date tour over the next year. Geoff Torrens, the band's manager, had taken demo tapes to various labels, but decided that the strategy to produce an album on their own was "the only way to open the door to a major label deal". Stoneground caught the attention of Warner Bros. Records, who connected them with Bob Gaudio to produce a new album.

The band recruited another new member, vocalist-keyboardist-writer Lenny Lee Goldsmith, for Hearts of Stone. The band recorded the album at Record Plant in Sausalito, California. "Prove It" served as the album's lead single, but album sales failed to meet expectations and the group was dropped from the label.

== Track listing ==
=== Side one ===
No.	Title	Length
1.	"Deeper Than Love"	3:47
2.	"You Can Only Hide Your Eyes"	4:15
3.	"Let It Go"	4:06
4.	"Free Spirit"	3:34
5.	"Lead Me Down"	4:10

=== Side two ===
No.	Title	Length
1.	"Hearts of Stone"	5:31
2.	"Prove It"	4:20
3.	"When You Gonna Tell Me Your Name"	4:57
4.	"North America"	4:02

== Personnel ==
- Tim Barnes – guitars, backing vocals
- Jo Baker – lead and backing vocals
- Terry Davis – bass, backing vocals
- Lenny Lee Goldsmith – lead and backing vocals, percussion
- Sammy Piazza – drums, percussion
- Annie Sampson – lead and backing vocals
- Fred Webb – keyboards, synthesizers, backing vocals, percussion
- Bob Gaudio – keyboards, synthesizers
- Jerry Peterson – saxophone
- Steve Fontana – percussion
