= Slalom Lake =

- Ozero Slalomnoye
- Location within Antarctica
- Location: Fildes Peninsula, King George Island, Antarctica
- Coordinates: 62°11′33″S 58°57′03″W
- Type: lake

Slalom Lake is a small lake 0.25 nautical miles (0.46 km; 0.29 mi) north of Ardley Cove, Fildes Peninsula, King George Island. Located near the Soviet Antarctic Expedition Bellingshausen Station, erected 1968, the lake was named "Ozero Slalomnoye" (Russian: Озеро Слаломное, slalom lake). The translated form has been approved.
