= Alex Baker (disambiguation) =

Alex Baker is a British politician.

Alex Baker may also refer to:

- Alex Baker, musician in Seven Summers
- Alex Baker, character in Five Points (TV series)

== See also ==
- Alexander Baker (disambiguation)
- Sasha Baker (born Alexandra Baker), American policy adviser
- Al Baker (disambiguation)
