= Hydrographers =

Hydrographers can refer to:

- Hydrographers Cove
- Hydrographers Passage
- Hydrographers Range
