= Saunders Valley =

Antarctica valley

Coordinates: 62°13′S 58°58′W

Saunders Valley is a valley 0.9 nautical miles (1.7 km) in length and varying width, trending WNW-ESE in south Fildes Peninsula, King George Island. The valley mouth opens to Hydrographers Cove. Named by the United Kingdom Antarctic Place-Names Committee (UK-APC) in 1977 for Andrew D. Saunders, British geologist, University of Birmingham, working with the British Antarctic Survey (BAS) party in this area, 1975.
