= Alexander Baker =

Alexander Baker may refer to:

- Alexander Baker (Jesuit) (1582–1638), English Jesuit
- Alexander Baker (MP) (1611–1685), English lawyer and politician

== See also ==
- Alex Baker (disambiguation)
- Al Baker (disambiguation)
