= Weaver Peninsula =

Peninsula in Antarctica

Weaver Peninsula (62°12′26″S 58°47′30″W) is a small man-made peninsula between Collins Harbor and Marian Cove, Maxwell Bay, King George Island, terminating in North Spit. It was named by the United Kingdom Antarctic Place-Names Committee (UK-APC) in 1977 after Stephen D. Weaver, geologist, University of Birmingham, with the British Antarctic Survey (BAS) party in this area in 1976.
