= Lake Kitezh =

Lake in the South Shetland Islands

- Location within Antarctica
- Location: Fildes Peninsula, King George Island, South Shetland Islands, Antarctica
- Coordinates: 62°11′37″S 58°57′55″W
- Type: lake

Lake Kitezh is a lake 0.3 nautical miles (0.6 km) long near the center of Fildes Peninsula, King George Island, in the South Shetland Islands. The largest of many lakes on the peninsula, it has been used as a reservoir by the Soviet Antarctic Expedition Bellingshausen Station and the Chilean Rodolfo Marsh Station. The name is adapted from the Russian "Ozero Kitezh" used in a 1973 geographical report by L.S. Govorukha and I.M. Simonov. The lake is named after Kitezh, an ancient Russian city of legendary fame.
