= Nebles Point =

Location in King George Island

Nebles Point (62°11′08″S 58°51′26″W) is a point forming the west side of the entrance to Collins Harbor in the southwest part of King George Island, South Shetland Islands. On his chart of 1825, James Weddell, Master, Royal Navy, applied the name Nebles Harbour to Collins Harbor, or possibly to an anchorage close north of Ardley Island; the detail of this part of his map cannot be interpreted with certainty. Nebles Point was assigned by the United Kingdom Antarctic Place-Names Committee (UK-APC) in 1960 in order to preserve Weddell's naming in the area. The point lies between the two possible positions of his name.
