= Let It Flow (Elvin Bishop album) =

Studio album by Elvin Bishop
- Released: May 1974
- Recorded: 1974
- Studios: Capricorn, Macon, Georgia
- Genres: Country rock; blues rock
- Label: Capricorn CPN 0134
- Producer: Johnny Sandlin

Elvin Bishop chronology
Rock My Soul (1972)	Let It Flow (1974)	The Best of Elvin Bishop: Crabshaw Rising (1975)

Let It Flow is a solo album by rock musician Elvin Bishop. His fourth studio album, it was released in 1974. The album was recorded at Capricorn Studios in Macon, Georgia, several years after he left the Butterfield Blues Band. Guest musicians include Charlie Daniels, Dickey Betts, Toy Caldwell, Vassar Clements, and Sly Stone.

The album peaked at No. 100 on the Billboard 200. "Travelin' Shoes" was his first entry on the Singles chart, reaching No. 61.

== Critical reception ==
Professional ratings
Review scores
Source	Rating
AllMusic	4.5/5 stars
The Encyclopedia of Popular Music	4/5 stars
MusicHound Rock: The Essential Album Guide	3/5 stars
The Rolling Stone Album Guide	3/5 stars

AllMusic wrote that "Bishop was able to emphasize the country/blues aspects of his persona and his music in the move from Marin County, California, to Macon, Georgia." The Rolling Stone Album Guide called the album "almost too laid-back for its own good."

== Track listing ==
All songs written by Elvin Bishop except where noted.

1. "Sunshine Special" – 3:40
2. "Ground Hog" – 3:30
3. "Honey Babe" – 3:20
4. "Stealin' Watermelons" – 4:02
5. "Travelin' Shoes" – 7:10
6. "Let It Flow" – 3:52
7. "Hey Good Lookin'" (Hank Williams) – 3:43
8. "Fishin'" – 4:26
9. "Can't Go Back" – 3:27
10. "I Can't Hold Myself in Line" (Merle Haggard) – 2:39
11. "Bourbon Street" – 2:16

== Personnel ==
- Elvin Bishop – electric guitar, acoustic guitar, slide guitar, lead vocals
- Johnny Sandlin – acoustic guitar, electric guitar, percussion, tambourine
- Johnny "V" Vernazza – acoustic guitar, electric guitar, slide guitar, background vocals
- Charlie Daniels – fiddle, acoustic guitar, washboard, background vocals
- Philip Aaberg – piano, keyboards, clavinet
- Donny Baldwin – drums, background vocals
- Dickey Betts – electric guitar
- Toy Caldwell – steel guitar
- Michael "Fly" Brooks – bass guitar
- Paul Hornsby – organ, keyboards
- Sly Stone – organ, keyboards
- Vassar Clements – strings
- Stephen Miller – piano
- Randall Bramblett – saxophone
- Dave Brown – saxophone
- Harold Williams – saxophone
- Billy Meeker – drums
- Jo Baker – percussion, background vocals
- Debbie Cathey – background vocals
- Gideon Daniels – background vocals
- Jerome Joseph – conga, conductor
- Annie Sampson – background vocals
- Mickey Thomas – background vocals
- David Walshaw – percussion, tambourine
- Johnny Sandlin – producer
- Sam Whiteside – recording engineer
