= Gary Duncan =

American guitarist, singer, and songwriter (1946–2019)

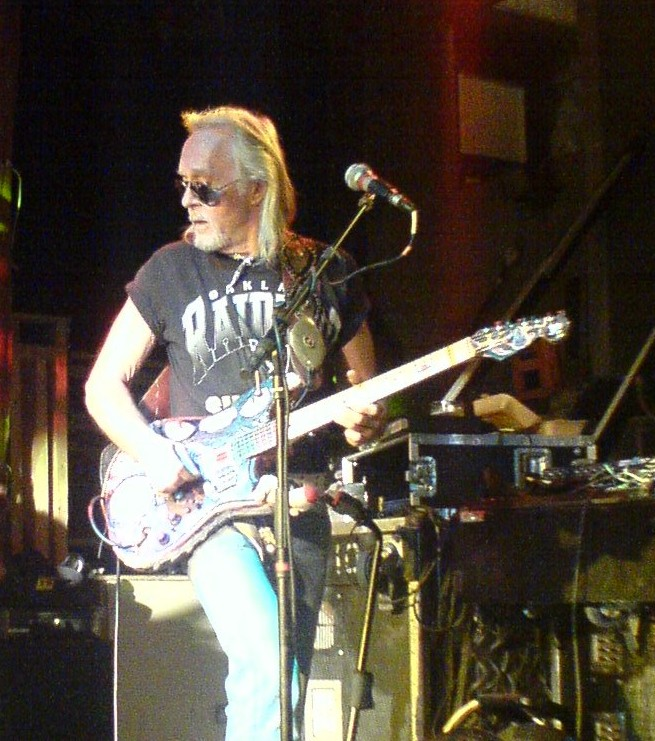

Background information
- Born: Eugene Duncan, Jr., Gary Ray Grubb; September 4, 1946; San Diego, California, U.S.
- Died: June 29, 2019 (aged 72) Woodland, California, U.S.
- Genre: Rock
- Occupation: Musician
- Instruments: Guitar; vocals
- Years active: 1960s–2019

Gary Duncan (born Eugene Duncan, Jr., adopted at birth and named Gary Ray Grubb, September 4, 1946 – June 29, 2019) was an American guitarist, singer and songwriter. He was guitarist with The Brogues, then most notably with Quicksilver Messenger Service.

== Early life and musical career ==
Born in San Diego, Duncan grew up in Ceres, California, where (as Gary Grubb) he played guitar for the Ratz until they finished their performance itinerary as an opening act for the Byrds and the Rolling Stones at the War Memorial Auditorium in San Jose, California. It was in 1965 when, as Gary Cole, he joined the Brogues, in Merced, California, and met future Quicksilver Messenger Service drummer Greg Elmore. It was with the Brogues that he adopted the stage name Gary Duncan. He stayed with them until they broke up in 1965.

== Quicksilver Messenger Service ==
In late 1965 Duncan received a call from John Cipollina offering an audition for himself and fellow Brogues member Greg Elmore to join Quicksilver Messenger Service. The group first performed in December 1965 at The Matrix. The complex guitar interplay between Duncan and John Cipollina had a big influence on the sound of psychedelic rock. In early 1969, after recording two albums, Duncan left Quicksilver and as he describes it, "I left for a year and rode motorcycles and lived in New York City and Los Angeles and just kind of went crazy for about a year."

By the beginning of 1970 Duncan rejoined Quicksilver Messenger Service along with singer/guitarist Dino Valenti which pushed the group toward a more folk rock sound. By 1971 the original group had splintered with Cipollina, David Freiberg and Nicky Hopkins all leaving while Duncan, Elmore and Valenti continued to perform as Quicksilver Messenger Service until the end of the 1970s.

== Later career ==
In the mid-1980s Duncan revived the Quicksilver name and began touring with his own band even releasing an album, Peace by Piece. He released a few more albums into the 1990s with the Quicksilver name but was the only original member in the group (except David Freiberg who guested on some tracks). He began touring with a four-piece band up until 2001 when the World Trade Center was attacked. After that Duncan recalled there were no more shows to play and he tore down his home studio for financial reasons. He said: "I tore the Studio apart by myself... no help from any of my friends... in fact not even a word... they all came and got the stuff they had stored and left the stuff they didn't want so I could haul it away and they just never spoke to me again..."

Duncan walked away from the music industry for the next few years until 2004, when he began releasing music from his Quicksilver band in the 1980s and 1990s. In 2006 Duncan reunited with Freiberg and began touring again as the Quicksilver Messenger Service. They were still performing up to his death.

== Death ==
On June 19, 2019, Duncan fell, and had a seizure, and had multiple cardiac arrests. He fell into a coma, and died on June 29, 2019, in Woodland, California, having never regained consciousness.

== Discography ==
=== With Quicksilver Messenger Service ===
- Quicksilver Messenger Service (1968)
- Happy Trails (1969)
- Just for Love (1970)
- What About Me (1970)
- Quicksilver (1971)
- Comin' Thru (1972)
- Solid Silver (1975)

=== With Gary Duncan's Quicksilver ===
- Peace by Piece (1986)
- Shape Shifter (1996)
- Live at Field Stone (1997)
- Six-String Voodoo (2009)
- The Hermit (2010)
- Strange Trim (2011)

=== With Crawfish of Love ===
- Snake Language (2006)
