= Family Album (Stoneground album) =

Studio album by Stoneground
- Released: 1971
- Genre: Rock and roll, country blues
- Length: 85:09
- Label: Warner Bros.
- Producer: Tom Donahue, Sal Valentino, Ron Elliott

Stoneground chronology
Stoneground (1971)	Family Album (1971)	Stoneground 3 (1972)

Family Album is the second album by American rock band Stoneground, a double album released in late 1971 on Warner Bros, consisting of live and studio recordings of original songs and covers.

== Composition and recording ==
Family Album is a double LP that contains three sides of live recordings taken from a KSAN-FM (San Francisco) radio broadcast, and one side of studio material. Musically, Stoneground combined rock and roll, blues, country and gospel. It features Stoneground originals, cover versions of songs by such artists as Bob Dylan, Johnny Cash, Hank Williams and Swamp Dogg, as well as compositions by Sal Valentino's former Beau Brummels bandmate Ron Elliott, who is credited as co-producer on the album.

== Critical reception ==
Billboard praised Lynne Hughes' vocals on "Passion Flower", Valentino's vocals on "You Must Be One of Us" and the album's music as "infectiously exciting and ... colored by a wonderfully lighthearted feeling". Writer Colin Larkin called Family Album "the group's definitive collection" as it "showcased the contrasting vocal styles and informal playing which made their music so appealing". A Gramophone review criticized the "pseudo-spontaneous, pseudo-joyful whooping and 'oohing' that the small studio audience insists on inserting between songs".

== Track listing ==
No.	Title	Length
1.	"Get Rhythm"	4:40
2.	"Passion Flower"	3:40
3.	"Corrina"	5:40
4.	"Big River"	6:15
5.	"Won't Be Long"	3:34
6.	"Super Clown"	4:35
7.	"Richland Woman"	3:35
8.	"Queen Sweet Dreams"	4:05
9.	"Precious Lord"	5:27
10.	"You Must Be One of Us"	3:25
11.	"All My Life"	3:00
12.	"Where Will I Find Love"	4:07
13.	"Gonna Have a Good Time"	4:43
14.	"Jam It"	5:40
15.	"It Takes a Lot to Laugh (It Takes a Train to Cry)"	3:25
16.	"I Can't Help It"	3:05
17.	"No Doreen"	3:30
18.	"It's Not Easy"	3:10
19.	"If You Got to Go"	3:28
20.	"Total Destruction to Your Mind"	6:05
