= Collins Harbour =

Bay in the South Shetland Islands, Antarctica

Collins Harbour (62°10′26″S 58°49′37″W) is a bay indenting the south coast of King George Island immediately east of Fildes Peninsula, in the South Shetland Islands. The name appears on a chart by Scottish geologist David Ferguson, who roughly charted the bay in 1913–14, but may reflect an earlier naming.

Bellingshausen Station is located here. Nebles Point lies at the west side of the harbor entrance.

== See also ==
- Weaver Peninsula
