= Marian Cove =

Body of water in Antarctica

Marian Cove (62°12′42″S 58°45′58″W) is a cove indenting the southwest part of King George Island between Collins Harbour and Potter Cove, in the South Shetland Islands, Antarctica. The name was used by Scottish geologist David Ferguson in a 1921 report based upon his investigations of King George Island in 1913–14, but may reflect an earlier naming.

The south side of its entrance is formed by South Spit.

== See also ==
- Weaver Peninsula
