= Eddy Point =

Eddy Point (62°13′52″S 58°58′08″W) is a small point located on the south side of Fildes Peninsula, 0.5 nautical miles (1 km) west of Halfthree Point on King George Island, in the South Shetland Islands. It was charted and named by Discovery Investigations personnel on the Discovery II in 1935. The feature is used as a reference point for locating the rocks which lie along the route of boats passing through Fildes Strait.
