= Tom Molyneux =

Canadian ice hockey player

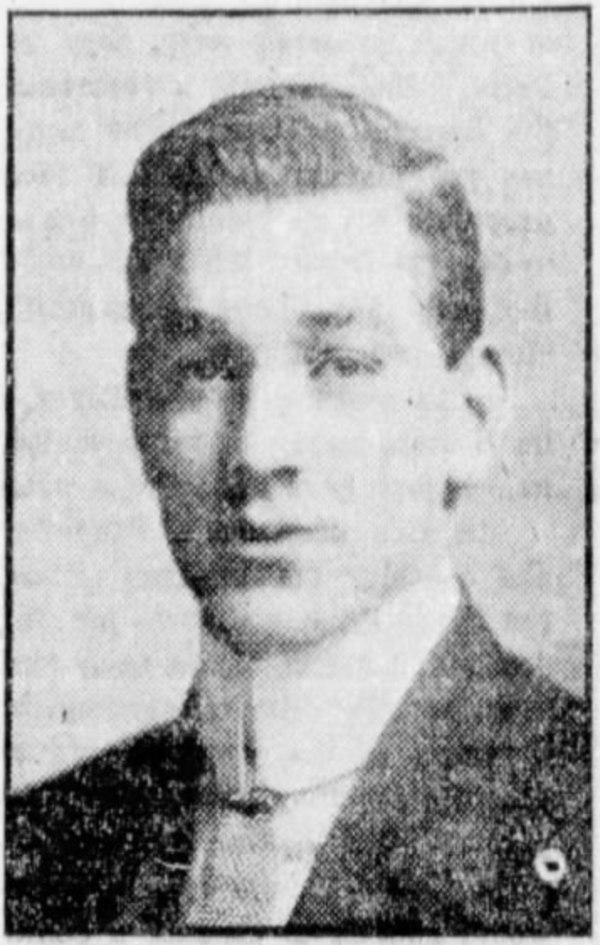
- Molyneux circa 1912
- Born: December 5, 1890; Barrow-in-Furness, England
- Died: February 21, 1955 (aged 64)
- Position: Forward
- Shot: Left
- Played for: Toronto Shamrocks
- Playing career: 1909–1915

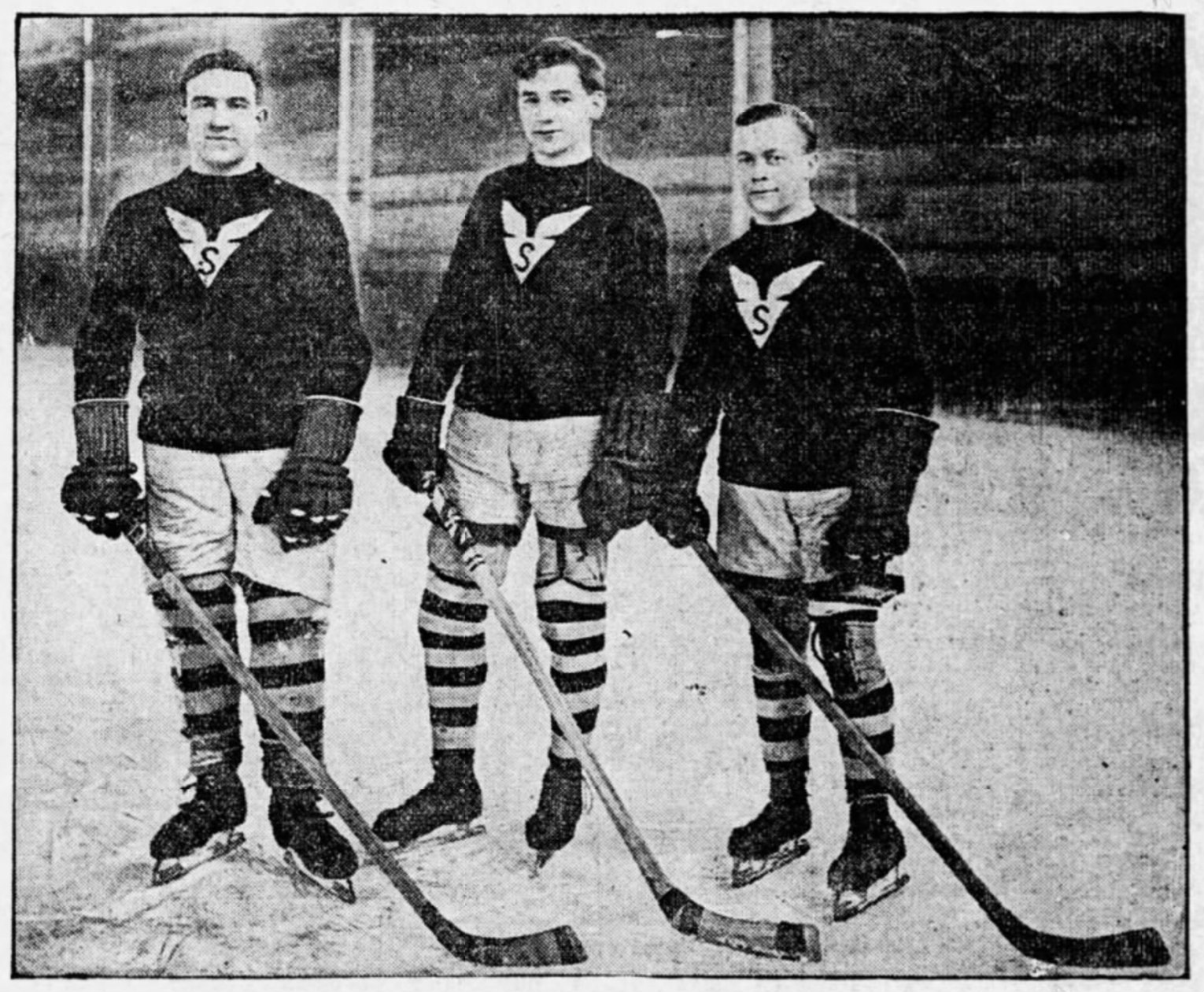
Molyneux (center) with Sherbrooke Saints teammates Raymie Skilton (left) and Alfred "Brownie" Baker (right).

Thomas Molyneux (December 5, 1890 – February 21, 1955) was an English born Canadian professional ice hockey player. He played with the Toronto Shamrocks of the National Hockey Association. He also played with the Sherbrooke Saints in Sherbrooke, Quebec.
