= Solid Silver =

Studio album by Quicksilver Messenger Service
- Released: November 1975
- Recorded: June 30 – August 29, 1975
- Studio: CBS (San Francisco)
- Genres: Psychedelic rock, acid rock
- Length: 38:16
- Label: Capitol
- Producer: John Palladino

Quicksilver Messenger Service chronology
Comin' Thru (1972)	Solid Silver (1975)	Peace by Piece (1986)

Solid Silver is the eighth album by American psychedelic rock band Quicksilver Messenger Service and their mid-1970s comeback album, reuniting the band's entire core lineup.

Though the album charted slightly higher than their previous two releases, briefly denting the Top 100 on the Billboard 200, this would be the last Quicksilver album until Gary Duncan resurrected the Quicksilver name in 1986 with the album Peace by Piece and again in the 1990s with several albums.

Professional ratings
Review scores
Source	Rating
Allmusic	3.5/5 stars

== Track listing ==
Side one

1. "Gypsy Lights" (Gary Duncan) – 3:40
2. "Heebie Jeebies" (John Cipollina) – 4:15
3. "Cowboy on the Run" (Dino Valenti) – 3:13
4. "I Heard You Singing" (David Freiberg, Robert Hunter) – 3:48
5. "Worryin' Shoes" (Valenti) – 3:25

Side two

1. "The Letter" (Valenti) – 4:06
2. "They Don't Know" (Duncan) – 3:54
3. "Flames" (Cipollina, Valenti) – 4:20
4. "Witches' Moon" (Valenti) – 2:59
5. "Bittersweet Love" (Valenti, Duncan) – 4:23

== Personnel ==
- Gary Duncan – guitar, pedal steel guitar, backing and lead ("Gypsy Lights", "They Don't Know", "Bittersweet Love") vocals
- John Cipollina – guitar, Hawaiian steel guitar, backing and lead ("Heebie Jeebies") vocals
- Greg Elmore – drums
- Dino Valenti – lead ("Cowboy on the Run", "Worryin' Shoes", "The Letter", "Flame") and backing vocals, rhythm guitar
- David Freiberg – bass and lead vocals ("I Heard You Singing")

=== Additional personnel ===
- Nicky Hopkins – piano
- Pete Sears – piano
- Michael Lewis – piano; organ ("Gypsy Lights"), ARP synthesizer ("Cowboy on the Run")
- Skip Olson – bass
- Mario Cipollina – bass
- Kathi McDonald – backing vocals ("Gypsy Lights", "The Letter", "They Don't Know", "Bittersweet Love")

== Charts ==
Album

Billboard (United States)

Year	Chart	Position
1975	Pop Albums	89
