= Quicksilver (album) =

Studio album by Quicksilver Messenger Service
- Released: November 1971
- Recorded: 1971
- Genres: Psychedelic rock, acid rock
- Length: 39:52
- Label: Capitol

Quicksilver Messenger Service chronology
What About Me (1970)	Quicksilver (1971)	Comin' Thru (1972)

Quicksilver is the sixth album by American psychedelic rock band Quicksilver Messenger Service.

== Background ==
Released in November 1971, it was the first album without original members John Cipollina and David Freiberg. Guitar duties were entirely taken over by Gary Duncan, while Mark Ryan took over on bass. Nicky Hopkins had also left at this point to continue his successful journeyman career, replaced by Mark Naftalin; only Gary Duncan and Greg Elmore remained from the original quartet. Several tracks, including "Song For Frisco" and "The Truth", had been premiered on stage in 1970 with the earlier lineup and were already well-known to Quicksilver fans. As on the previous two albums, Dino Valenti's compositions dominate, with all but two written or arranged by him.

The album saw a major decline in sales: whereas their previous four albums had reached the Top 30 on Billboard, Quicksilver failed to dent the Top 100.

Professional ratings
Review scores
Source	Rating
Allmusic	4/5 stars

== Track listing ==
All songs written by Dino Valenti except where indicated.

Side one

1. "Hope" – 3:01
2. "I Found Love" (Gary Duncan) – 3:56
3. "Song for Frisco" – 4:58
4. "Play My Guitar" – 4:38
5. "Rebel" (traditional, arranged by Dino Valenti) – 2:02

Side two

1. "Fire Brothers" (Duncan) – 3:12
2. "Out of My Mind" – 4:34
3. "Don't Cry My Lady Love" – 5:13
4. "The Truth" – 6:58

== Personnel ==
- Dino Valenti – guitar, lead vocals flute, percussion
- Gary Duncan – guitar, backing and lead ("I Found Love", "Fire Brothers") vocals
- Mark Naftalin – organ, piano
- Mark Ryan – bass
- Greg Elmore – drums, percussion

== Charts ==
Album

Billboard (United States)

Year	Chart	Position
1972	Pop Albums	114
