= Lyle Tuttle =

American tattoo artist and historian (1931–2019)

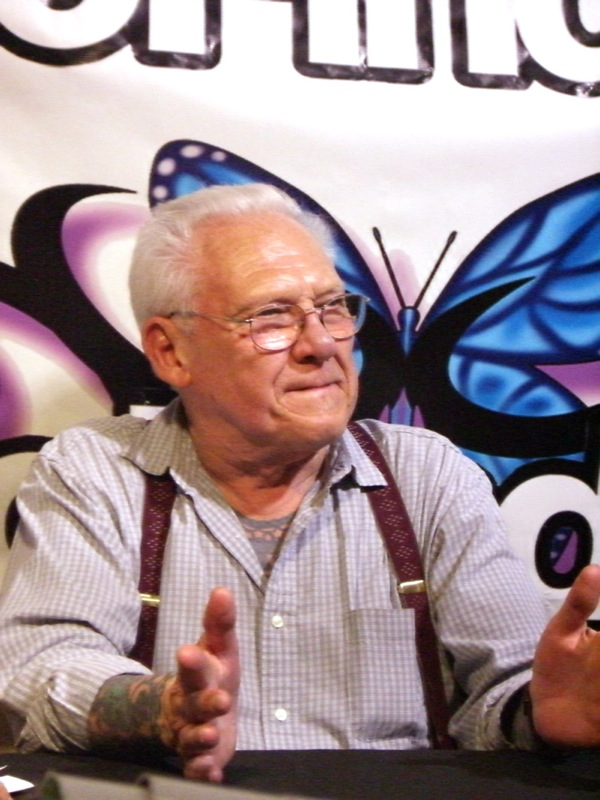
- Born: Lyle Gilbert Tuttle; October 7, 1931; Chariton, Iowa, U.S.
- Died: March 25, 2019 (aged 87); Ukiah, California, U.S.
- Occupation: Tattoo artist
- Years active: 1940s–1990s
- Spouses: Judy Aurre; Betty Lawson
- Children: one

Lyle Gilbert Tuttle (October 7, 1931 – March 26, 2019) was an American tattoo artist and historian of the medium, who had been tattooing since 1949. He tattooed Janis Joplin, Cher, Jo Baker, Paul Stanley, Jeff Scranton, and many other American musicians, actors, and celebrities.

== Early life ==
Tuttle was born in Chariton, Iowa on October 7, 1931 and grew up in Ukiah, California. He described his parents as "conservative Iowa farmers, living in California, but they really allowed me to have my own head." At the age of fourteen on a trip to San Francisco, he purchased his first tattoo for $3.50 (equivalent to $60 today) of a heart with the word “Mother” after seeing it on the shop wall.

== Career ==
In 1949, he began tattooing professionally. In 1954 he opened his own studio in San Francisco; this first shop was open for 35 years. Tuttle tattooed Janis Joplin, Cher, Jo Baker, the Allman Brothers, Peter Fonda, and Paul Stanley, among others. Rumor has it in the underground scene that he even tattoed US President John F. Kennedy, a claim the artist has never denied.

He did work on all seven continents, was tattooed on six continents, and never knowingly tattooed a minor. His fame within the U.S. tattoo world was somewhat controversial, as many tattooists of his day disliked his statements to the press and "shameless self-promotion". When Tuttle was on the cover of Rolling Stone magazine in October 1970, Sailor Jerry put the picture inside his toilet.

Tuttle taught seminars in "Tattoo machine maintenance and machine building" at tattoo conventions throughout the United States. When asked what made tattooing gain in popularity during his early career, he responded:

"Women's liberation! One hundred percent women's liberation! That put tattooing back on the map. With women getting a new found freedom, they could get tattooed if they so desired. It increased and opened the market by 50% of the population–half of the human race! For three years, I tattooed almost nothing but women. Most women got tattooed for the entertainment value ... circus side show attractions and so forth. Self-made freaks, that sort of stuff. The women made tattooing a softer and kinder art form."

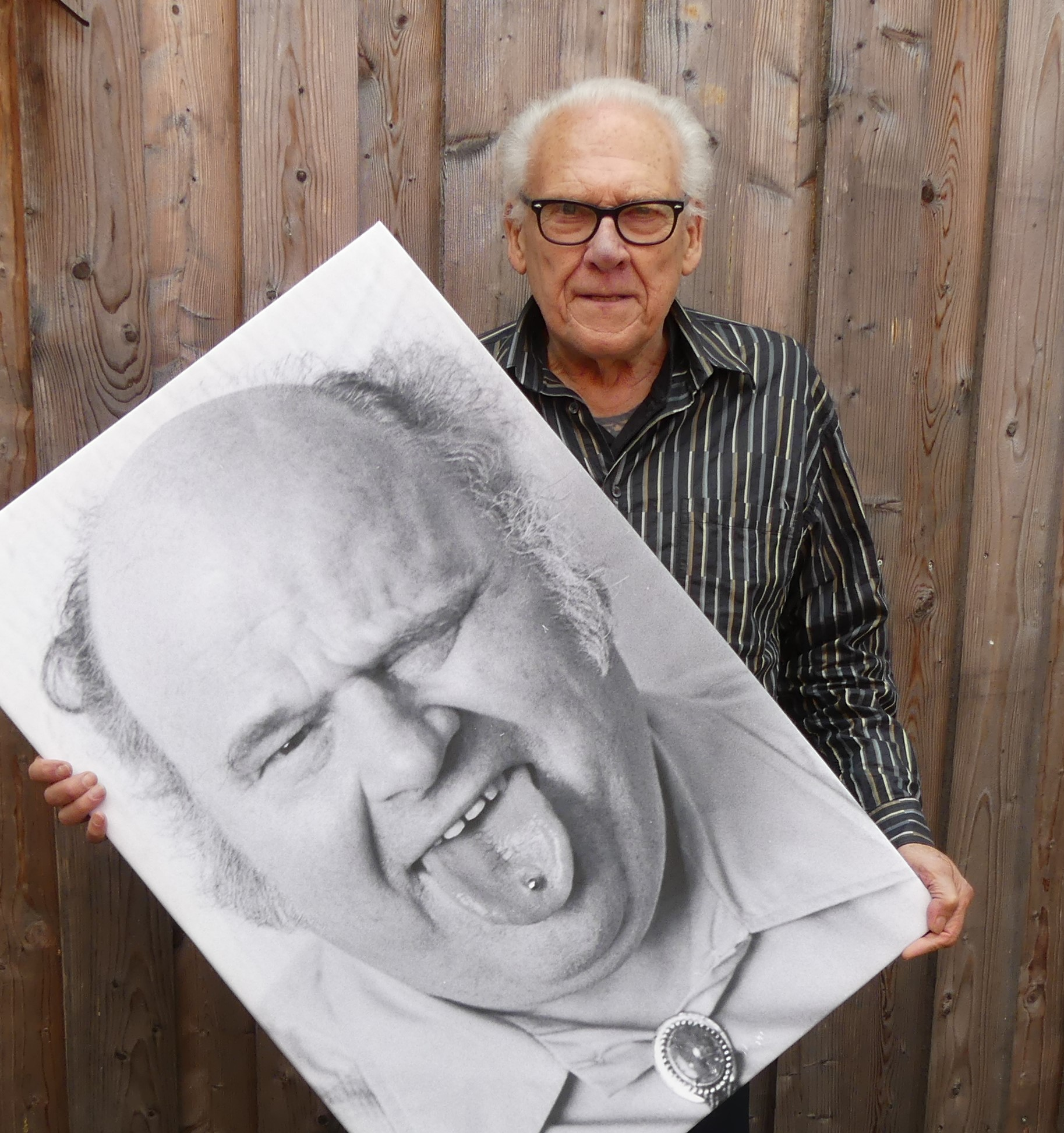
Tuttle on Oct. 2018 - with a picture of German tattoo artist Horst Streckenbach

His first shop when working for Bert Grimm was at 16 Cedar Way, Long Beach, California on "The Pike". After tattooing in Anchorage and Fairbanks, Alaska and California, Tuttle opened up shop in 1960 at 30 7th St., in between Mission and Market Streets, also referred to as South of Market, San Francisco. Tuttle worked for 29 and a half years, until the 1989 Loma Prieta earthquake caused the building to be yellow tagged. The shop reopened soon after at 841 Columbus Street and operated as a studio and museum for a time.

== Retirement and tattooing in Antarctica ==
He officially retired in 1990 but would often appear at tattoo conventions around the world and occasionally tattoo his signature on a friend or acquaintance.

On January 21, 2014, Tuttle became the first person to tattoo on all seven continents, once setting up an impromptu tattoo station in a scientist's guesthouse at the Russian Bellingshausen Station where he inked his autograph on project assistant/tattoo historian Anna Felicity Friedman. He said of the endeavor: “Because I was lucky to have the greatest time slot that any tattoo artist ever had in tattooing, it wound up that I had tattooed on six continents. So I had an opportunity to tattoo on seven continents. Well, I’m not out to break any records but why not do it? It’s there!".

== Death ==
An inoperable growth was discovered in his throat in March 2019 while he was in hospice care. On March 26, 2019, he died at the age of 87, in the home where he had grown up, in Ukiah, "practically covered in tattoos, himself."
