= Comin' Thru =

Studio album by Quicksilver Messenger Service
- Released: April 1972
- Genres: Psychedelic rock, acid rock
- Length: 36:33
- Label: Capitol

Quicksilver Messenger Service chronology
Quicksilver (1971)	Comin' Thru (1972)	Solid Silver (1975)

Comin' Thru is the seventh album by American psychedelic rock band Quicksilver Messenger Service. The album is marked by the debut of a horn section, while Chuck Steaks replaced Mark Naftalin on keyboards. Dino Valenti's songs dominate as they had on the last three albums, with his tune "Mojo" having appeared in their live setlist since 1970. It is generally regarded as their weakest effort, failing to chart higher than #134 and more or less marked the end of Quicksilver as anything other than a part-time band.

Professional ratings
Review scores
Source	Rating
Allmusic	2.5/5 stars

== Track listing ==
Side one

1. "Doin' Time in the U.S.A." (Gary Duncan) – 4:15
2. "Chicken" (Traditional, arranged by Dino Valenti) – 4:03
3. "Changes" (Valenti) – 4:15
4. "California State Correctional Facility Blues" (Valenti, Duncan, Greg Elmore, Chuck Steaks) – 6:10

Side two

1. "Forty Days" (Valenti, Duncan, Elmore) – 5:31
2. "Mojo" (Valenti) – 5:34
3. "Don't Lose It" (Duncan, Valenti) – 5:57

== Personnel ==
- Dino Valenti – guitar, lead vocals, congas
- Gary Duncan – guitar, backing and lead ("Doin' Time In The USA", "Don't Lose It") vocals
- Chuck Steaks – organ
- Mark Ryan – bass
- Greg Elmore – drums

=== Additional personnel ===
- Ken Balzell – trumpet (track B1)
- Dalton Smith – trumpet (tracks A3, B2, B3)
- Bud Brisbois – trumpet (tracks A3, B2, B3)
- Pat O'Hara – trombone (track B1)
- Charles C. Loper – trombone (tracks A3, B2, B3)
- Sonny Lewis – saxophone (track B1)
- Donald Menza – saxophone (tracks A3, B2, B3)

== Charts ==
Album

Billboard (United States)

Year	Chart	Position
1972	Pop Albums	134
