= Chet Powers =

American singer-songwriter (1937–1994)

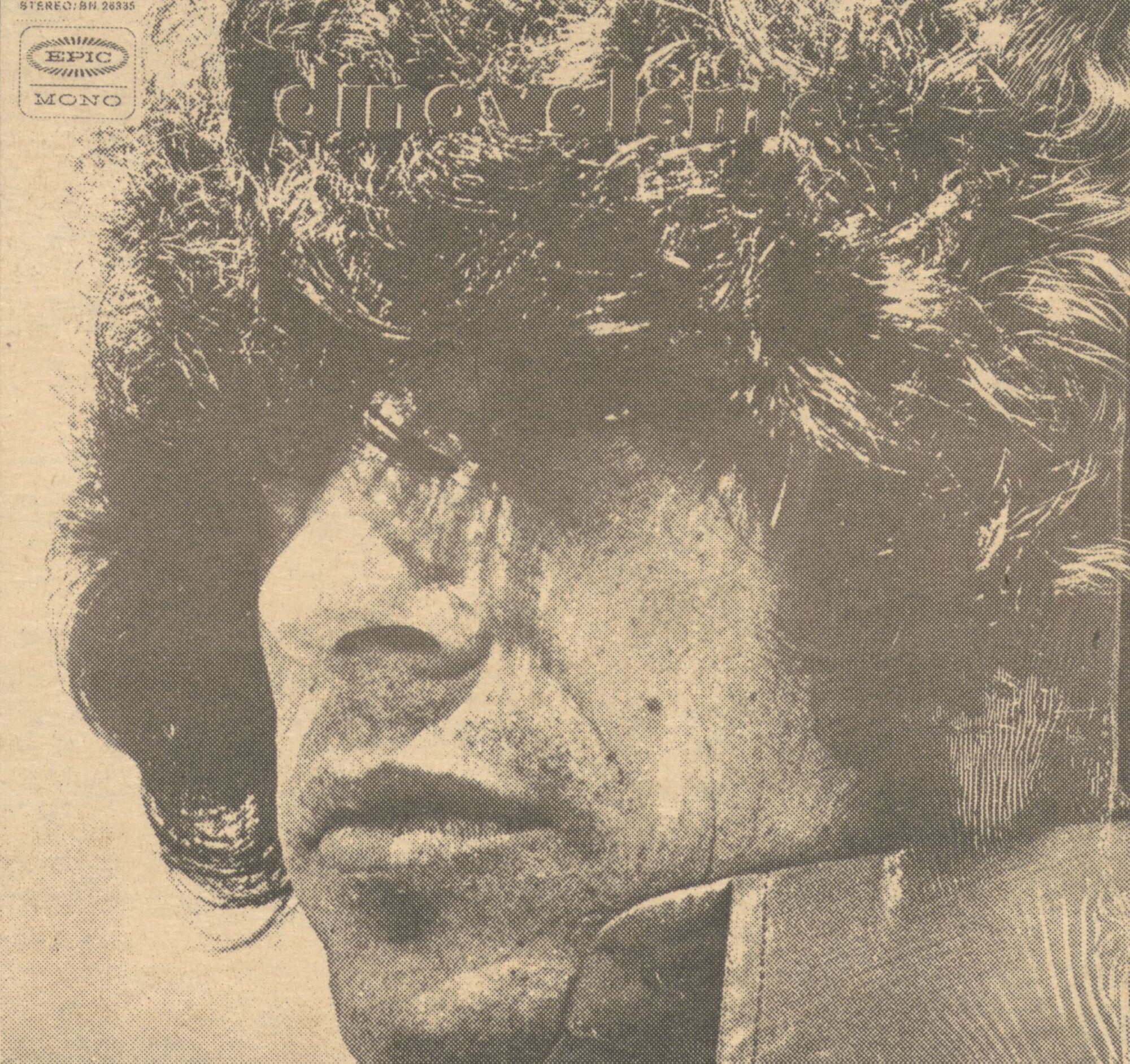
- "Dino Valente" (Chet Powers), 1968

Background information
- Also known as: Dino Valenti, Dino Valente, Jesse Orris Farrow, Jesse Oris Farrow
- Born: Chester William Powers, Jr. October 7, 1937; Danbury, Connecticut, United States
- Died: November 16, 1994 (aged 57) Santa Rosa, California, United States
- Genres: Folk, rock, blues, psychedelic rock, acid rock
- Occupation: Singer-songwriter
- Instruments: Vocals; guitar
- Years active: Late 1950s–1994
- Labels: Epic, Capitol
- Formerly of: Quicksilver Messenger Service

Chester William Powers, Jr. (October 7, 1937 – November 16, 1994) was an American singer-songwriter, and under the stage names Dino Valenti or Dino Valente, one of the lead singers of the rock group Quicksilver Messenger Service. As a songwriter, he was known as Jesse Oris Farrow. He is best known for having written the quintessential 1960s love-and-peace anthem "Get Together", and for writing and singing on Quicksilver Messenger Service's two best-known songs, "Fresh Air" and "What About Me?"

== Career ==
Before serving in the United States Air Force and playing in the coffeehouses of Boston and Provincetown, Massachusetts, Powers had already performed as "Dino Valenti" with small rock bands in New England lounges.

In the early 1960s, he performed in Greenwich Village and North Beach coffeehouses such as the Cock 'n' Bull and the Cafe Wha? at the height of the American folk-music revival, often with fellow singer-songwriter Fred Neil, and occasionally with Karen Dalton, Bob Dylan, Lou Gossett, Josh White, Len Chandler, Paul Stookey, David Crosby and others. He influenced other performers, most notably Richie Havens, who continued to perform some of Powers' early "train songs". Powers was prevented from acquiring a cabaret license due to an earlier arrest, a requirement that was beginning to be imposed on Village entertainers at the time.

By 1963, Valenti/Powers moved to Los Angeles, where many luminaries in the imminent folk rock movement had already begun to coalesce. During this period, he wrote and popularized "Let's Get Together". Frequently covered as "Get Together", the song was performed by a diverse array of groups throughout the decade, including The Kingston Trio, We Five, The Back Porch Majority, The Dave Clark Five, H. P. Lovecraft, Jefferson Airplane and in particular The Youngbloods, whose 1967 rendition peaked at No. 5 and attained a RIAA gold certification in the United States upon its 1969 re-release (prompted in part by the National Conference of Christians and Jews employing the song as their theme in television and radio commercials). He also popularized and controversially claimed the copyright of Billy Roberts's "Hey Joe".

Valenti/Powers then returned to the San Francisco Bay Area, where he recorded for Autumn Records (an acetate of these sessions exists in a Quicksilver collector's possession), though no album was ever issued. He had been friendly with Roger McGuinn in Los Angeles, and drummer Michael Clarke played in a band with Valenti/Powers in Big Sur before joining McGuinn in The Byrds. He also played in an early (albeit undesignated) line-up of the San Francisco psychedelic rock group Quicksilver Messenger Service when John Cipollina, David Freiberg, and Jim Murray all joined his backing group in 1964.

Powers' career was blighted by several drug busts. After an arrest for possession of marijuana, he was searched again by police (who found more marijuana and amphetamines in his apartment) while awaiting trial. He received a one-to-ten-year sentence served in part at Folsom State Prison. To raise money for his defense, he sold the publishing rights for "Get Together" to Frank Werber, the manager of The Kingston Trio. While in prison, the Quicksilver Messenger Service recorded Valenti/Powers's song "Dino's Song", which was released on the Quicksilver Messenger Service (album) in 1968.

After completing his sentence, Valenti/Powers signed with CBS's Epic Records, releasing an eponymous solo album under a variation of his pseudonym (Dino Valente) in 1968. Shortly thereafter, he served as the opening act for Jimi Hendrix at San Francisco's Winterland Ballroom from October 10–12, 1968, exposing his work to a broader audience.

He traveled with Quicksilver's Gary Duncan to New York in January 1969 to form a new band (to be called The Outlaws) shortly before Quicksilver's noted album Happy Trails appeared in March. While Valenti/Powers and Duncan were in New York, British keyboardist Nicky Hopkins joined Quicksilver for their third album, Shady Grove (December 1969).

As 1969 progressed, The Outlaws came to naught, eventually leading to Duncan's reinstatement and Valenti/Powers formally joining Quicksilver at the band's New Year's Eve concert, held at the Kabuki Theater in San Francisco. Eight of the nine songs on the group's next album, Just for Love (August 1970), were written by Valenti/Powers, six of them under the pseudonym of "Jesse Oris Farrow", including the single "Fresh Air", a moderate American hit that peaked at No. 49 in November 1970. He remained the primary songwriter on their next album, What About Me? (December 1970). The Valenti/Powers-penned title track scraped the Billboard 100 in March 1971, peaking at No. 100. Despite underperforming on AM radio, both of these songs became mainstays on progressive rock and album-oriented rock radio stations, and would later be heard in the classic rock format.

Following the departure of Cipollina and Freiberg (who had been convicted of marijuana possession), the band subsequently released Quicksilver (1971) and Comin' Thru (1972) as various Valenti/Powers-fronted lineups (always including Duncan and drummer Greg Elmore) continued to tour irregularly through 1974. The 1969–1971 lineup (with Hopkins only contributing as a session musician on select tracks) briefly reunited in 1975 for Solid Silver and a promotional tour, however, the much-anticipated album only reached No. 89 in the United States. Although Freiberg (then a multi-instrumentalist in Jefferson Starship) and Cipollina soon departed, an iteration of the band including Valenti/Powers, Duncan and Elmore once again continued to tour through 1979.

Powers underwent surgery for a cerebral arteriovenous malformation (CAVM) in the late 1980s. In spite of suffering from short-term memory loss and the effects of anti-convulsive medications, he continued to write songs and play with fellow Marin County musicians.

His last major performance was a benefit at San Francisco's Great American Music Hall.

== Personal life ==
Powers died suddenly at his home in Santa Rosa, California, on November 16, 1994, leaving behind a younger sister, Catherine (Kay), and three sons, Paul, Joli and Sterling.

== Pseudonyms ==
- Jackie Powers
- Dino Valenti
- Dino Valente
- Jesse Oris Farrow
- Jesse Otis Farrow

== Discography ==
=== Solo ===
==== Albums ====
- Dino Valente (1968)

==== Singles ====
- Don't Let It Down / Birdses (1964)

==== Compilations ====
- Get Together... The Lost Recordings (2007)

=== with Quicksilver Messenger Service ===
- Just for Love (1970)
- What About Me (1970)
- Quicksilver (1971)
- Comin' Thru (1972)
- Solid Silver (1975)
