= Mary E. Baker =

African-American activist

Mary E. Baker (1923–1995) was a notable African-American community activist and leader in Brockton, Massachusetts.

== History ==
Mary E. Baker was the first African-American to work at Brockton City Hall. She was a 1941 graduate of Brockton High School, and commenced her working career as a legal secretary, prior to obtaining employment with the city. Her community involvement and leadership were in the areas of affordable housing and racial integration in education. Baker was instrumental in the establishment of two affordable housing complexes in Brockton, as well as being associated with the implementation of integration plans for Brockton public schools.

Baker was a member of one of the founding families of the African-American community of Brockton. Her father, General Baker, a descendant of slaves, was the founding Deacon of Lincoln Congregational Church, established in 1897. Her niece was singer Jo Baker (1948-1996), who was notable for her associations with Elvin Bishop and Stoneground.

Baker commenced her post-secondary education at the age of 52, entering a Bachelor's program at the University of Massachusetts Boston. She later obtained a master's degree in education from Cambridge College. In her later career, Baker was employed by Massasoit Community College for fourteen years where, as the college's first minority outreach coordinator, she was instrumental in the establishment and operation of outreach programs in Boston and in southeastern Massachusetts generally. An annual memorial scholarship was established in the name of Mary E. Baker at Massasoit Community College.

Baker died suddenly from liver cancer in 1995, at the age of 72, during the course of planning her candidacy to enter the election for Brockton city council.

In December 2008, a new Brockton school was named after her in 2008, and she was the first woman and the first African-American to receive this honor from the city.
