= Thomas Molineux (stenographer) =

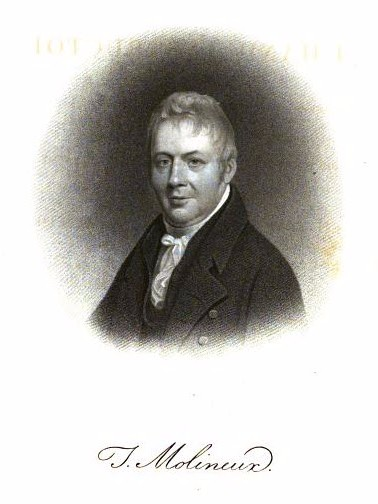
Thomas Molineux

Thomas Molineux (1759–1850) was an English stenographer and schoolteacher.

== Life ==
Born in Manchester on 14 May 1759, Molineux studied at the school in Salford run by Henry Clarke. There he learned John Byrom's system of shorthand, and before he was 17 he became a writing-master and teacher of accounts in King Edward VI's Grammar School, Macclesfield.

Molineux resigned from the school in 1802, and died in Macclesfield on 15 November 1850, aged 91.

== Works ==
Molineux published The Elements of Short-hand: Being an Abridgement of Mr. Byrom's Universal English Short-hand (1791). It is a simplified representation of the Byrom system, with a few alterations. Molineux later brought out other works on the same subject, with engraved copperplates. One of them is partly written in epistolary form. Popular, they passed through about a dozen editions. Some are entitled An Introduction to Byrom's Universal English Short-hand, and others The Short-hand Instructor or Stenographical Copy Book. The editions of The Instructor published in 1824 and 1838 have a portrait of Molineux, engraved by Robert Cabbell Roffe from a painting by Scott.

Molineux was also the author of a short treatise on arithmetic. His letters to Roffe were edited and printed privately in a limited edition, as The Grand Master (London, 1860). Roffe was an engraver in London, whom Molineux taught shorthand by correspondence, and who became the author of another modification of the Byrom system. It contains notes on shorthand authors.

== Family ==
Molineux was married and had a daughter, who married John Jackson, vicar of Over, Cheshire.

== Notes ==
Attribution

This article incorporates text from a publication now in the public domain: Lee, Sidney, ed. (1894). "Molineux, Thomas". Dictionary of National Biography. Vol. 38. London: Smith, Elder & Co.
