= Stoneground (album) =

Studio album by Stoneground
- Released: 1971
- Genre: Pop rock, blues rock
- Length: 36:47
- Label: Warner Bros.
- Producer: Tom Donahue, Sal Valentino

Stoneground chronology
Stoneground (1971)	Family Album (1971)

Stoneground is the debut studio album by American rock band Stoneground, released in 1971 on Warner Bros. The album featured seven different lead vocalists, including Sal Valentino (formerly of The Beau Brummels) on four of the album's ten songs.

== Background and composition ==
During the early 1970s, Stoneground built buzz as a touring act. The band recorded an attempt at a debut album in London for Warner Bros. but it was not released. While in England, the band added Bassist, keyboardist Pete Sears to its lineup. For Stoneground, seven different lead vocalists were used, with Sal Valentino singing lead on four of the album's ten songs. Valentino wrote five of the six originals on the album, which also contained covers of songs recorded by The Kinks, Reverend Gary Davis, John D. Loudermilk and John Mayall.

== Critical reception ==
Professional ratings
Review scores
Source	Rating
Allmusic	4/5 stars
Christgau's Record Guide	B−

In a review for the album, Billboard wrote: "Stoneground has a lot of advance publicity to live up to, and in light of their first LP the predictions may have been somewhat inflationary, though there's no denying the potential for excitement here." Village Voice critic Robert Christgau asserted that the album was "certainly the aptest use of Sal Valentino since the Beau Brummels were on Autumn." Bob Koch of Isthmus suggested it sounded "more like a compilation album than one band," but that it also "showed the group's promise well; most of the singers are distinctive and the playing is great. The musicians' ability to fluidly mix and match musical styles makes for a more interesting brand of hippie rock than is the case for many similarly jammy supersized bands of the era." Allmusic's Lindsay Planer said the Valentino compositions "bear repeated listens and hint at this group's truly great potential." Author Vernon Joynson complimented Tim Barnes' guitar work and said the album "used several vocalists to good effect."

== Track listing ==
No.	Title	Writer(s)	Length
1.	"Looking for You"	Sal Valentino	4:32
2.	"Great Change Since I've Been Born"	Reverend Gary Davis	3:04
3.	"Rainy Day in June"	Ray Davies	2:39
4.	"Added Attraction (Come and See Me)"	Valentino	3:04
5.	"Dreaming Man"	Valentino	4:45
6.	"Stroke Stand"	Valentino	4:02
7.	"Bad News"	John D. Loudermilk	3:17
8.	"Don't Waste My Time"	John Mayall, Sonny Thompson	3:38
9.	"Colonel Chicken Fry"	Valentino	4:20
10.	"Brand New Start"	John Blakely, Tom Donahue	3:56

== Personnel ==
- Sal Valentino - lead vocals, acoustic and electric guitars, tambourine
- Tim Barnes - lead guitar, backing and lead vocals, bottleneck guitar
- Luther Bildt - guitars, backing and lead vocals
- Annie Sampson - backing vocals
- Deirdre Laporte - backing vocals
- Lydia Phillips - backing vocals
- Lynn Hughes - backing vocals
- Pete Sears - keyboards, bass
- Ron Nagle - keyboards, percussion
- John Blakeley - bass, rhythm guitar
- Mike Mau - drums
