= Peace by Piece =

Studio album by Gary Duncan + Quicksilver
- Released: 1986
- Genres: Synth rock, pop rock
- Label: Capitol
- Producers: Gary Duncan, Sammy Piazza, Bob Olhsson

Quicksilver Messenger Service chronology
Solid Silver (1975)	Peace by Piece (1986)	Shape Shifter Vols. 1 & 2 (1996)

Peace by Piece is the ninth album by San Francisco psychedelic rock band Quicksilver Messenger Service, credited to "Gary Duncan/Quicksilver". Only featuring Duncan, drummer Sammy Piazza, and additional guests, it functions more as a Duncan solo album. A later released CD-version includes two bonus tracks, entitled "Crazy Jesse" and "Electric Love".

== Reception ==
In his 1-star review for AllMusic.com, William Ruhlmann panned the effort, saying in part, "[This is] an album that has nothing to do with Quicksilver Messenger Service and isn't any good."

== Track listing ==
1. "Good Thang" – (Duncan, Piazza) 4:41
2. "24 Hours Deja Vu" – (Duncan, Piazza) 4:31
3. "Midnight Sun" – (Duncan, Piazza) 5:20
4. "Swamp Girl" – (Michael Brown) 5:51
5. "Wild in the City" – (Duncan, Piazza) 5:16
6. "Pool Hall Chili" – (Duncan, Piazza) 4:27
7. "Pistolero" – (Duncan, Piazza) 5:07
8. "Peace by Piece" – (Duncan, Piazza) 9:54

== Personnel ==
- Gary Duncan – guitar, vocals, synthesizer
- Sammy Piazza – drums, percussion

Additional personnel

- W. Michael Lewis – piano, synthesizer
- Raul Rekow – percussion
- John Santos – percussion
- Jules Broussard – saxophones
- Martin Fierro – saxophone
- Steve Schuster – saxophone
- David Freiberg – backing vocals ("Midnight Sun", "Electric Love")
- Kathi McDonald – backing vocals
- Linda Imperial – backing vocals
- Jo Baker – backing vocals
