= South Spit =

Geographical feature in Antarctica

South Spit (62°13′29″S 58°47′49″W) is a rocky spit forming the south side of the entrance to Marian Cove, King George Island, in the South Shetland Islands. The descriptive name appears on a British Admiralty chart showing the results of a survey by DI personnel on the Discovery II in 1935.
