= Alan Baker =

Alan Baker may refer to:

- Alan Baker (politician) (born 1956), American politician
- Alan T. Baker (born 1956), United States Navy chaplain
- Alan Baker (mathematician) (1939–2018), English mathematician
- Alan Baker (footballer) (1944–2026), footballer for Aston Villa
- Alan Baker (diplomat) (born 1947), former Israel ambassador to Canada
- Alan Baker (geographer) (born 1938), British geographer
- Alan Baker (poet) (born 1958), British poet
- Alan Baker (philosopher), professor of philosophy and shogi player
- Alan Baker, author (Invisible Eagle)
- Sarah Jane Baker (born 1969), British convicted criminal, transgender rights activist and author

== See also ==
- Al Baker (disambiguation)
