= North Spit =

North Spit (62°12′33″S 58°48′08″W) is a rocky spit forming the north side of the entrance to Marian Cove, King George Island, in the South Shetland Islands. The descriptive name appears on a chart showing the results of a survey by DI personnel on the Discovery II in 1935.
