= Hydrographers Cove =

Hydrographers Cove (62°12′51″S 58°57′14″W) is a cove between the southwest side of Ardley Island and Fildes Peninsula, King George Island, in the South Shetland Islands. The approved name is a translation of the Russian "Bukhta Gidrografov" (bay of the hydrographers), applied in 1968 following Soviet Antarctic Expedition surveys from Bellingshausen Station.
