= Stoneground =

American rock band

- Stoneground in 1971

Background information
- Origin: Concord, California, U.S.
- Genres: Blues-rock, album-oriented rock
- Years active: 1970–1984, 2003–2005
- Label: Warner Bros.
- Past members: Sal Valentino; Tim Barnes; Dave McCullough; Luther Bildt; Mike Mau; John Blakeley; Lynne Hughes; Annie Sampson; Lydia Moreno; Deirdre LaPorte; Pete Sears; Cory Lerios; Steve Price; Brian Godula; David Jenkins; Jo Baker; Fred Webb; Terry Davis; Sammy Piazza; Lenny Lee Goldsmith; Dana Moret; Claudia Knauer; Greg King; Charlie McGimsey; Kelly Stephens; Terence Clements; Joe Gazzaroli; Stephan Bryan Salit
- Website: Official website

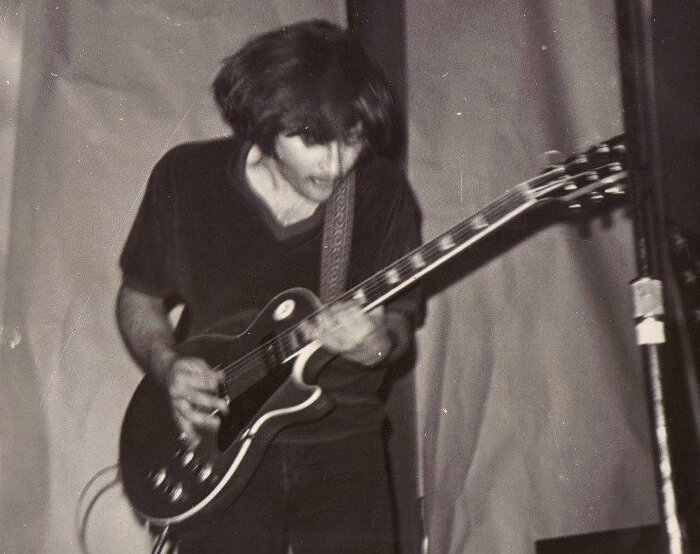
Tim Barnes, original Stoneground lead guitarist

Stoneground was an American rock band formed in 1970 in Concord, California. Originally a trio, Stoneground expanded to a 10-piece band by the time of their eponymous 1971 debut album. The group appeared in two films, Medicine Ball Caravan (1971) and Dracula A.D. 1972 (1972), and released three albums before singer Sal Valentino quit in 1973. Three other band members—Cory Lerios, Steve Price and David Jenkins—left to form pop group Pablo Cruise. Stoneground continued as an act through 1982, with only Tim Barnes and Annie Sampson remaining from the early incarnation of the band. Barnes and Price led a re-formed Stoneground in 2003 and released a studio album the following year.

== History ==
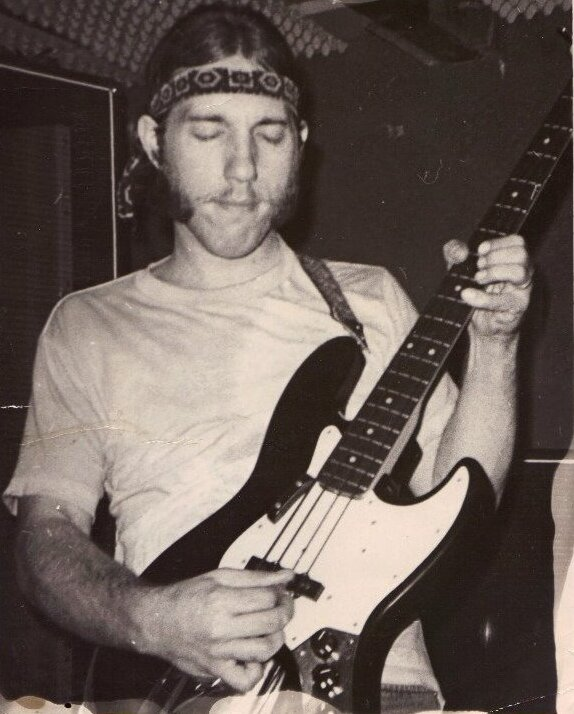
Craig Randall, first bassist

Stoneground was formed in 1970 in the San Francisco Bay Area suburb of Concord, California. The original lineup consisted of Tim Barnes (guitars, vocals), Craig Randall (Bass), and Mike Mau (drums). Band manager and former Autumn Records executive Tom Donahue introduced the band to ex-Beau Brummels singer Sal Valentino and John Blakely (guitars, bass), both of whom joined Stoneground. Four female vocalists—Annie Sampson, Lynne Hughes, Lydia Phillips, and Deirdre LaPorte—were also added to the group. While touring America the band added another new member, Kit Thomas on bass. After flying to England he was replaced by bassist/keyboardist Pete Sears who toured the UK and France with them, playing the Canterbury Festival and recording an album at London’s Trident Studios engineered by Bob Mathews and Betty Cantor Jackson. Sears went on to work with many bands including Jefferson Starship and Hot Tuna. Stoneground's self-titled debut album, released in early 1971, featured seven different lead singers on the album's ten tracks. The album was produced by Tom Donahue with Sal Valentino assisting on some tracks. Sears left the band after recording to fly to London and records on Rod Stewart’s Every Picture Tells A Story, he was replaced on bass by Mario Cipollina. Music journalist Robert Christgau said the album was "certainly the aptest use of Sal Valentino since the Beau Brummels were on Autumn". A Billboard review remarked that "Stoneground has a lot of advance publicity to live up to, and in light of their first LP the predictions may have been somewhat inflationary, though there's no denying the potential for excitement here".

During this touring period, Stoneground was a "traveling house band" for Medicine Ball Caravan, an attempt by Warner Bros. to promote the band and capitalize on the success of the concert film genre following Woodstock. The Medicine Ball Caravan film, which documented the 8,000 mile cross-country trip by 154 people in a "hippie caravan" of buses, trucks and musical groups, was directed by François Reichenbach—with Martin Scorsese as associate producer—and released in 1971. Three Stoneground songs appear on the original soundtrack, which also contains songs by Alice Cooper, B.B. King, Delaney & Bonnie, Doug Kershaw, and The Youngbloods.

Pete Sears left the band and returned to England to record on Rod Stewart's classic "Every Picture Tells a Story" album, later returning to the US with Long John Baldry. Cory Lerios (keyboards, vocals) and Steve Price (drums) joined the band prior to the recording of Stoneground's second album, the double-LP Family Album, released in 1971. Billboard described the music as "infectiously exciting and ... colored by a wonderfully lighthearted feeling", and praised Lynne Hughes' vocals on "Passion Flower", the closest Stoneground ever came to having to a hit single. The song was also included on Fillmore: The Last Days, a 1972 triple live album chronicling the final run of concerts organized by rock concert promoter Bill Graham at San Francisco's Fillmore West, which closed on July 4, 1971. In 1972, the band released their third album, Stoneground 3. They also appeared in that year's Hammer Studios film Dracula A.D. 1972 starring Christopher Lee and Peter Cushing.

By 1973, the band was dropped by Warner Bros. due to disappointing record sales, and tensions within the group had risen after three years of constant touring. Stoneground's original formation played their final concert on January 6 at Sacramento Memorial Auditorium. The performance was released as an album, The Last Dance: Live January 6, 1973, by Dig Music in 2001. Within weeks of the concert, Sal Valentino left the group and moved on to a short-lived Beau Brummels reunion. Three other members—Lerios, Price, and David Jenkins—left to form the pop group Pablo Cruise. Barnes led various rosters of Stoneground for another ten years, along with original member Annie Sampson and singer Jo Baker, who joined in 1974. Other members included Terry Davis (guitars, vocals), Fred Webb (keyboards, vocals) and Sammy Piazza (drums). The band released three more albums during this period: Flat Out (1976), Hearts of Stone (1978), and Play it Loud (1980). In 1982, Stoneground released "Bad Machines and Limousines", an E.P. with early band member Pete Sears appearing as a guest on keyboards. In 2004, a re-formed Stoneground—featuring Barnes and Price—released the album Back with a Vengeance.

== Discography ==
=== Albums ===
Year	Album details
1971	Stoneground: Label: Warner Bros. Records
1971	Family Album: Label: Warner Bros. Records
1972	Stoneground 3: Label: Warner Bros. Records
1976	Flat Out: Label: Flat Out Records
1978	Hearts of Stone: Label: Warner Bros. Records
1980	Play It Loud: Label: Crystal Clear Records
2001	The Last Dance: Live January 6, 1973: Label: Dig Music; Release date: October 9, 2001
2004	Back with a Vengeance: Label: Exploding Star Music; Release date: April 14, 2004

=== EP ===
Year	Album details
1982	Bad Machines and Limousines: Label: Line Records

=== Singles ===
Year	Song
1971	"Queen Sweet Dreams": B-side: "Total Destruction"; Label: Warner Bros. (#7452)
1971	"Looking For You": B-side: "Added Attraction (Come And See Me)"; Label: Warner Bros. (#7496)
1971	"You Must Be One Of Us": B-side: "Corrina, Corrina"; Label: Warner Bros. (#7535)
1972	"Passion Flower": B-side: "Super Clown"; Label: Warner Bros. (#7546)
1978	"Prove It": B-side: "Prove It" (mono); Label: Warner Bros. (#8676)
