= Henry Clarke (mathematician) =

English mathematician (1743–1818)

Henry Clarke (1743–1818) was an English mathematician, a significant teacher in north-west England, and mathematical writer and translator. He worked also as a surveyor and science lecturer.

== Life ==
He was the son of Thomas Clarke, born at Salford and baptised 17 April 1743; William Augustus Clarke the Baptist minister and Protestant Association member was his brother. He was educated at Manchester Grammar School, and at age of 13 became assistant in Leeds academy of the Quaker Aaron Grimshaw, a Quaker. Here he made the acquaintance of Joseph Priestley.

After a brief partnership with Robert Pulman, a schoolmaster at Sedbergh, he travelled in Europe, and returned to settle as a land surveyor in Manchester. He again became a schoolmaster, and the rest of his career was spent in educational posts. He first had a "commercial and mathematical" school in Salford, giving lectures on astronomy and other scientific subjects. While the school was not a success in financial terms, Clarke trained future mathematicians, such as Hugh Byrom and Thomas Molineux, and contributors to mathematical periodicals, including the Ladies' Diary. Clarke in 1788 was an unsuccessful candidate for the salaried mastership of a school in Stretford.

A member of the Manchester Literary and Philosophical Society, in 1783 Clarke became lecturer in mathematics and experimental philosophy in its "College of Arts and Sciences", which only lasted a few years. In 1792 he moved to Liverpool, and, after returning to Manchester, was at Bristol from 1799 till 1802. He was in that year appointed professor of history, geography, and experimental philosophy at the Royal Military College at Great Marlow, which moved in 1812 to Sandhurst, Berkshire. In 1802 he was also made LL.D. by the University of Edinburgh.

Clarke retired on a pension in 1817, and died at Islington, 29 April 1818. He had been a candidate for the Royal Society in 1783, but was opposed by the influence of Sir Joseph Banks, then its President. Samuel Horsley, a critic of Banks, singled out this case.

== Works ==
Clarke's works were:

- Practical Perspective, 1776 (for the use of schools).
- The Rationale of Circulating Numbers, 1777.
- Dissertation on the Summation of Infinite Converging Series with Algebraic Divisors, translated from Antonio Maria Lorgna, 1779, with appendix. John Landen attacked it in a pamphlet, stating that the method was contained in Thomas Simpson's Mathematical Dissertations. Clarke replied in a Supplement (1782), and to a further attack in Additional Remarks, 1783. The controversy was noted in Charles Hutton's Mathematical Dictionary (under "Landen"), the work having been dedicated to Hutton. Clarke was attacked in the Monthly Review for 1783, and defended by Horsley.
- The School Candidates, 1788, a squib on the election to Stretford school. Clarke appears to have published two further pieces, The Pedagogue and The College, of similar character, about the same time.
- Tabula Linguarum, 1793, tables of declension and conjugation in forty languages, a book of outmoded philology.
- Tachygraphy, or Shorthand improved, before 1800, based on John Byrom's system.
- The Seaman's Desiderata, 1800, tables for calculating longitude, etc.
- Animadversions on Dr. Dickson's translation of Carnot's reflections on the Theory of the Infinitissimal [sic] Calculus, 1802. Against William Dickson's translation of Lazare Carnot.
- Abstract of Geography, 1807, school book for Marlow College.
- Virgil revindicated, 1809, answer to a tract by Horsley on the "Two Seasons of Honey" in the Georgics of Virgil.

Clarke was a contributor to mathematical journals, especially to the Ladies' Diary, edited by Charles Hutton, from 1772 to 1782. He drew some plates for John Whitaker's History of Manchester.

== Family ==
On 2 April 1766 Clarke married Martha Randle of Manchester. Of 17 children, two sons and four daughters survived him.

== Notes ==
Attribution

This article incorporates text from a publication now in the public domain: Stephen, Leslie, ed. (1887). "Clarke, Henry". Dictionary of National Biography. Vol. 10. London: Smith, Elder & Co.
