= Stoneground 3 =

Studio album by Stoneground
- Released: 1972
- Genre: Pop rock, blues rock
- Length: 42:23
- Label: Warner Bros.
- Producer: Sal Valentino

Stoneground chronology
| Family Album (1971) | Stoneground 3 (1972) | Flat Out (1976) |

Stoneground 3, sometimes stylized as Stoneground Three, is the third album by American rock band Stoneground, released in 1972 on Warner Bros. It was the final studio album to feature the band's original lineup, as eight of the ten members quit shortly after the album's release.

== Composition ==
In contrast with the band's first two albums, which featured a blend of hard rock, country and blues, Stoneground 3 is musically quite a bit more straightforward pop rock. The album consists of twelve original songs including six written by Sal Valentino, who also produced the album. Only three songs clock in at more than four minutes, another departure from the band's earlier releases.

== Release and reception ==
Released in late 1972, Stoneground 3 sold poorly and the band was dropped by Warner Bros. With no label and escalating tensions within the group, Stoneground played a final concert on January 6, 1973 at the Sacramento Memorial Auditorium. The performance was released in 2001 as an album titled The Last Dance. Within weeks of the concert, Valentino quit the group. Band members Cory Lerios and Steve Price left and formed a new group, Pablo Cruise. The remaining members also departed except for Tim Barnes and Annie Sampson, who reformed Stoneground with a new roster later that year.

Bob Koch of Isthmus wrote that album track "From a Sad Man into a Deep Blue Sea" is possibly Valentino's finest Stoneground composition. He also claimed that Stoneground 3 is the band's "most coherent-sounding album due to the more unified sound," but was unsure "whether that coherency is an improvement over their earlier more free-wheeling efforts."

== Track listing ==
| No. | Title | Length |
|---|---|---|
| 1. | "Dancin'" | 3:59 |
| 2. | "On My Own" | 2:50 |
| 3. | "You Better Come Through" | 2:55 |
| 4. | "Ajax" | 3:17 |
| 5. | "Down to the Bottom" | 3:56 |
| 6. | "From a Sad Man into a Deep Blue Sea" | 3:33 |
| 7. | "From Me" | 5:03 |
| 8. | "Lovin' Fallin'" | 4:01 |
| 9. | "Butterfly" | 3:13 |
| 10. | "Gettin' Over You" | 2:15 |
| 11. | "Heads Up" | 4:04 |
| 12. | "Everybody's Happy" | 3:17 |
