= Clement Hill (cricketer, born 1904) =

Australian cricketer

Personal information
- Born: 2 July 1904; Gulgong, Australia
- Died: 21 May 1988 (aged 83); Newcastle, New South Wales, Australia
- Source: ESPNcricinfo, 31 December 2016

Clement Hill (2 July 1904 – 21 May 1988) was an Australian cricketer. He played fifteen first-class matches for New South Wales between 1932/33 and 1934/35.

== Biography ==
Clem Hill, a Gulgong-born schoolteacher unrelated to the acclaimed batsman of the same name, carved out a successful, albeit brief, first-class cricket career as an orthodox slow left-arm bowler. His journey to prominence began with the North Sydney Club, which he joined after his family's relocation to Sydney. Despite an interruption in 1926 due to a teaching posting in the Hunter Valley, he resumed his progress in 1930, partnering with fellow schoolteacher and bowler, Bill O'Reilly. This duo, known for their relentless pursuit of batsmen, led North Sydney to their first premiership since 1912–13 in the 1931–32 season, with O'Reilly and Hill claiming 54 and 38 wickets respectively.

The 1932–33 season witnessed Hill's selection for New South Wales. Despite a modest start, his performance peaked against Queensland, achieving match figures of 12 for 67, and scoring a career-best 91. His debut season culminated with 22 wickets at an average of 15.27, crowning him the leader in first-class bowling averages.

Although Hill's performance in 1933–34 sparked speculation of a potential England tour, his form faltered, leading to a debate over over-bowling. Despite being selected for a New Zealand tour that was ultimately cancelled due to a disagreement between the cricket boards, Hill achieved a standout performance against Victoria, claiming 8 for 71 in the match.

Balancing cricket with teaching proved a financial challenge for Hill; despite earning £1 a day for cricket, his teaching income was suspended during play. Following a 6 for 41 performance against Victoria in 1934-35, and subsequent transfer to Canberra, Hill's career with New South Wales concluded. He continued to play club cricket in Canberra while showcasing his versatility as a rugby league player for Kurri Kurri.

Hill also played two first grade rugby league games for North Sydney in 1926.

== See also ==
- List of New South Wales representative cricketers
