= Jo Baker (singer) =

American singer-songwriter (1948–1996)

- Jo Baker and Elvin Bishop, 1972; Promotional Poster, Fillmore Management; Image also used on back cover of Rock My Soul (1972)

Background information
- Born: September 6, 1948; Brockton, Massachusetts
- Died: November 11, 1996 (aged 48) Oakland, California
- Genre: Blues rock
- Years active: 1964 - 1992
- Labels: Fillmore; Epic; Warner Bros.
- Formerly of: Stoneground

Jo Baker (September 6, 1948 – November 11, 1996) was an American vocalist and songwriter, known primarily for her work with Elvin Bishop and Stoneground.

== History ==
=== Early history ===
Jo Baker was named after performer Josephine Baker. She was born and spent her childhood and adolescence in Brockton, Massachusetts, near Boston, as a member of one of the founding families of the community. Her paternal grandfather, General Baker, a descendant of slaves, was the founding Deacon of Lincoln Congregational Church, established in 1897. Her aunt, Mary E. Baker (d. 1995), the youngest daughter of the twelve children of General Baker and his wife Nannie, was the first African-American to work at Brockton City Hall, following her graduation from Brockton High School in 1941. In her honor, a new Brockton school was named after her in 2008, with Mary E. Baker being the first woman and the first African-American to be so honored by the city.

Jo Baker was from a family of six children. She had four sisters and a brother. She also came from a family with a significant military tradition. Her father, Harrison, was a veteran of World War II, decorated for service in the Pacific, followed by a lifelong involvement with veterans organizations. The family later moved from Brockton to the Teaticket community of Falmouth, Massachusetts.

=== Performance and recording history ===
Baker began performing publicly in Boston in 1964. Baker first met Elvin Bishop in 1967, when she was singing at a jam session of the Paul Butterfield Blues Band, of which Bishop was then a member. She moved to San Francisco in 1968, living with one of her sisters, and joined Elvin Bishop in his new band, which he formed in January 1969. Prior to forming his band, Bishop had searched for Baker by placing an ad in Rolling Stone in 1968, stating "Jo Baker, wherever you are, please call Elvin Bishop", followed by a San Francisco telephone number.

Baker was not listed as a band member and did not record with the Elvin Bishop Band until the band's second album, Feel It!, released in 1970, to which she contributed her song, "I Can't Go On". The band's eponymously titled first album, released in 1969, had been subject to criticism in relation to the quality of Bishop's vocals. Baker thereafter became a lead vocalist on much of the band's material, as well as a general harmony vocalist. Her position as a black female lead vocalist in an otherwise all male and predominantly white blues band was rare. During 1970 and 1971, Baker was joined on vocals by the Pointer Sisters, prior to their professional debut as a separate act, which occurred as a result of their association with Bishop.

Boz Scaggs, subsequent to his departure from the Steve Miller Band, heard Baker In San Francisco, performing "Loan Me A Dime", with Elvin Bishop. When recording his second album in Muscle Shoals in 1969, Scaggs telephoned Baker in San Francisco and received some of the lyrics, to which he added his own. The song became Scaggs' first major solo hit.

In 1971, Baker shared the stage with Scaggs during the closing week of Fillmore West, providing vocals as part of a jam session including Scaggs and Taj Mahal on guitar and vocals, and Elvin Bishop on guitar. Two songs from this performance were later included on the Fillmore: The Last Days record release.

Baker was considered to excel at high energy blues, exemplified by the song "Rockbottom" (also referred to as "Rock Bottom"), which she co-wrote with Bishop, and which was released on the Elvin Bishop Band's 1972 album, Rock My Soul. Baker's position in the band was underscored by the back cover of the album featuring a photo solely of Baker and Bishop, while a solo picture of Bishop was the album's front cover. Baker and Bishop were similarly featured in related promotional material.

Baker was one of the earlier female artists to wear tattoos. She was included in a 1972 Life Magazine article on tattoos, in which she was pictured with a heart tattoo containing a musical note, positioned above her left breast. The tattoo was by Lyle Tuttle.

By early 1973, Baker's position in Bishop's band had changed. For his fourth album (his third with Baker), Let It Flow, released in 1974 on Capricorn Records, his new label, Bishop had disbanded his original group in 1973, moved to Macon, Georgia and recorded with a number of different musicians. By mid-1973, Baker was no longer appearing onstage with Bishop. He also engaged Annie Sampson, of Stoneground and Mickey Thomas, in addition to Baker, primarily as background vocalists. For Bishop's second release on Capricorn Records, Juke Joint Jump, Baker had a similarly diminished role, sharing vocals with June Pointer and again with Mickey Thomas. Baker was romantically involved with Bishop, and ultimately ceased working with Bishop in 1974, prior to the 1975 release of Juke Joint Jump, due to conflicts between their musical and personal relationships.

By the fall of 1973, Baker joined Stoneground, where she shared vocals with Annie Sampson. "Rockbottom" was included in the band's repertoire. A later configuration of the band also issued a recording of the song. Baker remained a member of Stoneground until the early 1980s, during which she recorded three albums with the band.

Baker also contributed to the recordings of others. In 1970, she contributed vocals to the eponymously titled solo album release by Stephen Miller, keyboard player in the Elvin Bishop Band. In 1972, Baker contributed to a recording project by San Francisco disc jockey and producer Abe "Voco" Kesh, Lights Out: San Francisco (Voco Presents The Soul of The Bay Area), released on Blue Thumb Records. With Linda Tillery, Lydia Pense and Tower of Power vocalist Rick Stevens, Baker contributed vocals to one of four Tower of Power tracks on the album. In 1975 and 1976, she provided background vocals to releases by Taj Mahal. She was the second vocalist on the Eddie Money hit, "Baby Hold On", from his debut album, released in early 1978. Baker continues to be remembered by Money when he performs the song onstage. In late 1978, Baker and Sampson contributed to a King Biscuit Flower Hour broadcast by Journey, in an rare audience-free studio recording, from the Automatt, the most popular recording facility in San Francisco. Included in the sessions were Tom Johnston of The Doobie Brothers and the Tower of Power horns. The sessions, titled "Superjam 2", were never broadcast at the time, due to legal entanglements. In addition to selections from Journey's album Infinity, released in 1977, plus other popular Journey songs, the sessions featured the band and friends performing a number of soul and blues classics. Jo Baker singing "Love Hurts", by Felice and Boudleaux Bryant, is considered to be a standout performance from the sessions. Baker later contributed vocals to Peace by Piece, the first album by a reconstituted version of Quicksilver Messenger Service, released in 1986.

Subsequent to leaving Stoneground in the early 1980s Baker performed locally, in San Francisco, for approximately a decade. She sang a variety of musical styles with others and with her own group, Jo Baker and The Boys, which she formed in 1981.

=== Illness and death ===
In the 1990s, Baker's health began to fail, causing her to retire from music in 1992, at the age of 44. For two years prior to her death, she suffered from liver disease, from which she ultimately died.

Baker died on November 11, 1996. At her request, she was cremated without ceremony, leaving a spouse, her siblings and her parents.

=== Legacy ===
In 1999, Elvin Bishop was ranked by the San Francisco Chronicle as Number 65 in a list of the "100 All-Time Best Bands" of the Bay Area, with its definitive song being identified as "Rock Bottom", and Jo Baker being described as an "incendiary soul belter". Bishop, as accompanied by Baker, was considered to have "ruled the Bay Area club scene when that still mattered". Another reviewer described Baker as being able to "stand a foot and a half back from the mike and come through as clearly as most singers up much closer."

== Discography ==
=== With Elvin Bishop ===
- 1975 Elvin Bishop,Juke Joint Jump (Capricorn)
- 1974 Elvin Bishop, Let It Flow (Capricorn)
- 1972 Elvin Bishop Band, Rock My Soul (Epic)
- 1970 Elvin Bishop Group, Feel It! (Fillmore)

=== With Stoneground ===
- 1980 Play It Loud (Crystal Clear)
- 1978 Hearts Of Stone (Warner Bros.)
- 1976 Flat Out (Flat Out)
