= Al Baker (disambiguation) =

Al Baker (born 1956) is an American football player.

Al Baker may also refer to:

- Al Baker (baseball) (1906–1982), American baseball player
- Al Baker (magician) (1874–1951), American magician
- Akbar Al Baker (born 1962), CEO of Qatar Airways

== See also ==
- Alan Baker (disambiguation)
- Albert Baker (disambiguation)
- Alfred Baker (disambiguation)
- Alexander Baker (disambiguation)
- Baker (surname)
