= Clement Hill (Antarctica) =

Clement Hill (62°13′17″S 58°58′24″W) is a hill rising to 135 m, the highest elevation in southern Fildes Peninsula, 1 nautical mile (1.9 km) northwest of Halfthree Point, King George Island, South Shetland Islands. The United Kingdom Antarctic Place-Names Committee (UK-APC) named the hill in 1977 after Colin C. Clement, Falkland Islands Dependencies Survey (FIDS) base leader and diesel mechanic at Admiralty Bay, 1956-57.
