= Alexander Baker (Jesuit) =

English Jesuit

Alexander Baker (1582–1638), was an English Jesuit.

== Biography ==
Baker was born in Norfolk in 1582. He entered the Society of Jesus about 1610 and was professed of the four solemn vows in 1627 and visited India twice as a missionary.

Baker died on 24 August 1638 in London, where he had resided for many years. He reconciled William Coke, a son of Sir Edward Coke, to the Catholic Church in 1615. Among the State papers is a manuscript by Baker in defence of the doctrine of Baptismal regeneration as held by Catholics, showing its difference from the opinion of Protestants.
