= Brownie Baker =

Canadian ice hockey player

Alfred "Brownie" Baker
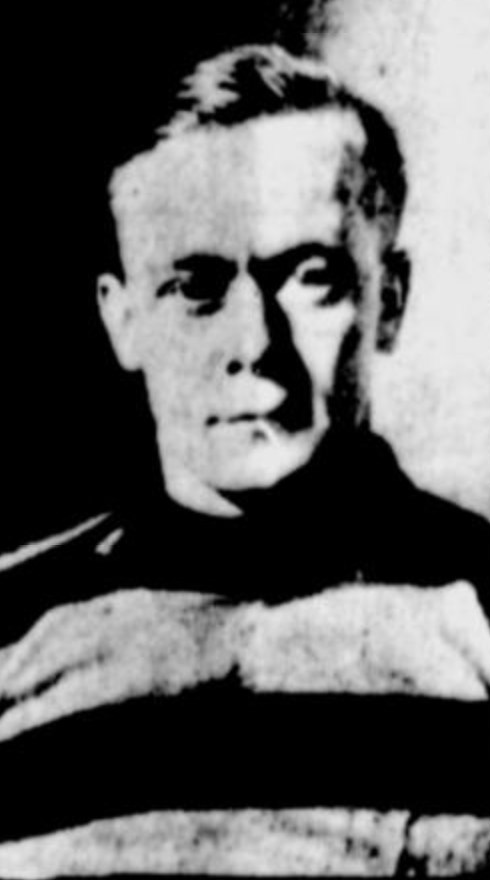
- Photo from Montreal Daily Mail, January 21, 1915
- Born: March 21, 1889 Lennoxville, Quebec, Canada
- Died: January 11, 1939 (aged 49) Lennoxville, Quebec, Canada
- Height: 5 ft 8 in (173 cm)
- Weight: 155 lb (70 kg; 11 st 1 lb)
- Position: Right wing
- Shot: Right
- Played for: Montreal Wanderers
- Playing career: 1906–1918

Alfred Hedge "Brownie" Baker (March 21, 1889 – January 11, 1939) was a Canadian professional ice hockey player. He played as a right winger with the Montreal Wanderers of the Canadian-based National Hockey Association for three seasons between 1914 and 1917.

Baker is buried at Malvern Cemetery in Sherbrooke, Quebec.
