= Ardley Cove =

Ardley Cove (62°12′03″S 58°57′12″W) is a cove that lies north of Ardley Island in Maxwell Bay, King George Island. It was named Caleta Ardley by an Argentine expedition (about 1957) in association with Ardley Island.
