= Mary Landon Baker =

American socialite and heiress (1901–1961)

Mary Landon Baker (b. August 15, 1901; died 1961) was a rich American socialite and heiress famous for her romantic life. Newspapers worldwide covered her love life with Allister McCormick, whom she repeatedly left at the altar in the early 1920s.

In 1926 she was briefly engaged to Bojidar Pouritch, who worked as a Yugoslav diplomat; a New York Times correspondent stated their engagement caused, "the greatest excitement since the European war".

Among those she rejected as possible husbands were also an English Lord, a rich Spaniard, and an Irish prince. She reportedly had received 65 marriage proposals by the time she died, but never married. The New York Times reported that the theater actor Barry Baxter died of a heart attack on the day that Baker broke up with him.

Baker was apparently enamoured for most of her life with the British politician and writer Henry "Chips" Channon who refers to her repeatedly in his published diaries.

== Family ==
Baker's parents were Chicago lawyer and financier Alfred L. Baker and Mary Corwith. She had an older sister, Isabelle, whose married name in 1926 was Mrs. Robert M. Curtis and in 1934, Mrs. Isabelle Baker Curtis Welch, and two nieces Isabelle and Priscilla.

Baker lived most of her life in Chicago, and when her father died in 1927 she inherited a large inheritance which allowed her to remain single and live on her own, unlike many women at the time who lacked money of their own.
