= Bellingshausen Station =

Russian Antarctic base on King George Island

- Antarctic base
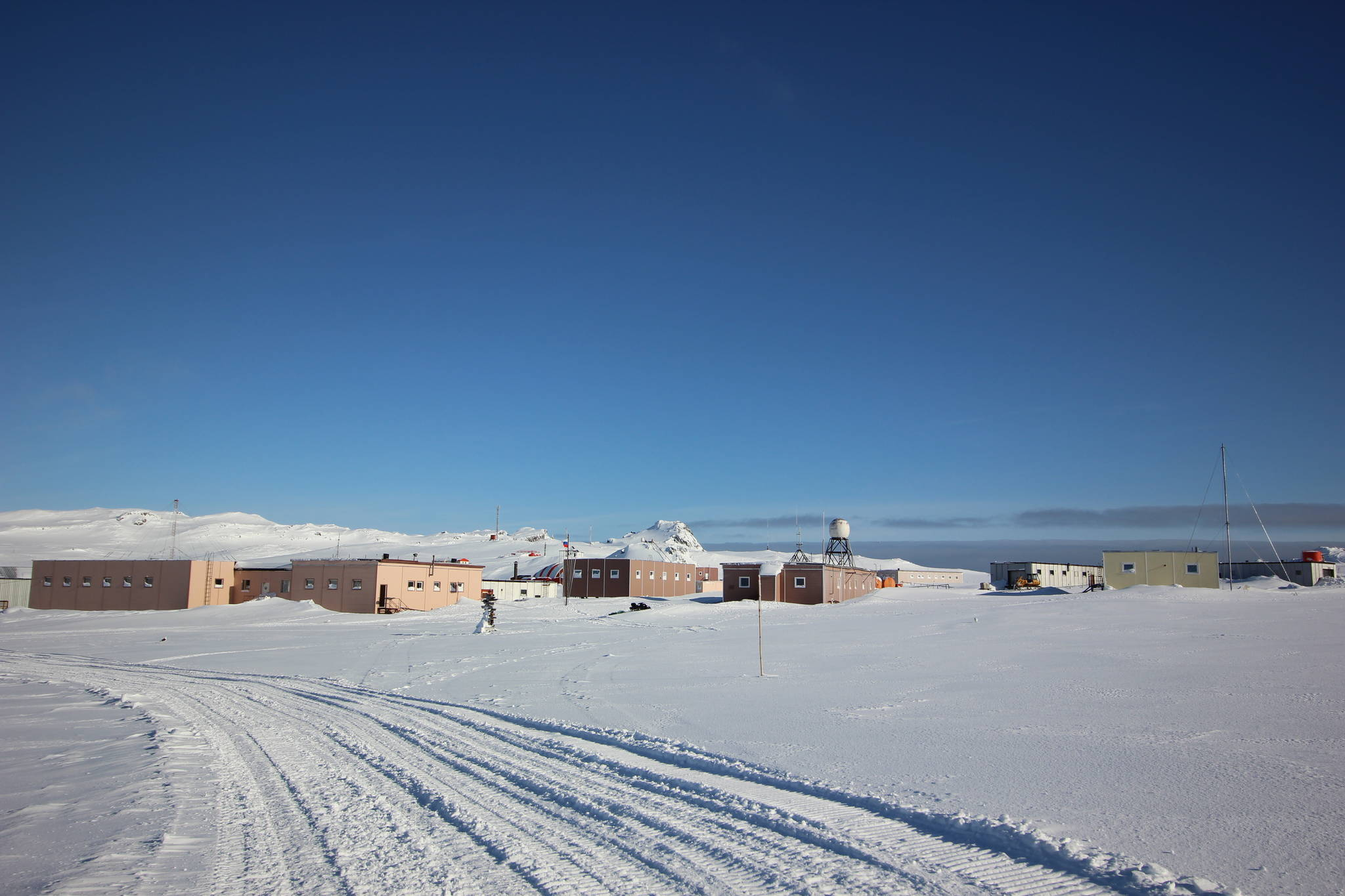
- Bellingshausen base in winter

- Location of Bellingshausen Station in Antarctica
- Coordinates: 62°11′55″S 58°57′38″W
- Country: Russia
- Location in Antarctica: Collins Harbour; King George Island; South Shetland Islands
- Administered by: Russian Antarctic Expedition
- Established: 22 February 1968
- Named for: Fabian Gottlieb von Bellingshausen
- Elevation: 16 m (52 ft)

Population (2017)
  - Summer: 40
  - Winter: 20
- UN/LOCODE: AQ BHN
- Type: All year-round
- Period: Annual
- Status: Operational
- Activities: List: Biology; Ecology; Flora (lichen studies); Hydrology; Ornithology
- Website: Arctic and Antarctic Research Institute

Bellingshausen Station (Russian: станция Беллинсгаузен) is a Russian Antarctic station at Collins Harbour, on King George Island of the South Shetland Islands. It was one of the first research stations founded by the Soviet Antarctic Expedition in 1968. It is also the location of Trinity Church, the only permanently staffed Eastern Orthodox church in Antarctica. The base is adjacent to the Chilean town of Villa las Estrellas.

The station is connected by unimproved roads to the nearby stations: Chilean Base Presidente Eduardo Frei Montalva, Chinese Great Wall Station, and Uruguayan Artigas Base.

It is antipodal to a location in Russian Siberia, ~400 kilometres (250 mi) west from Yakutsk.

== History ==
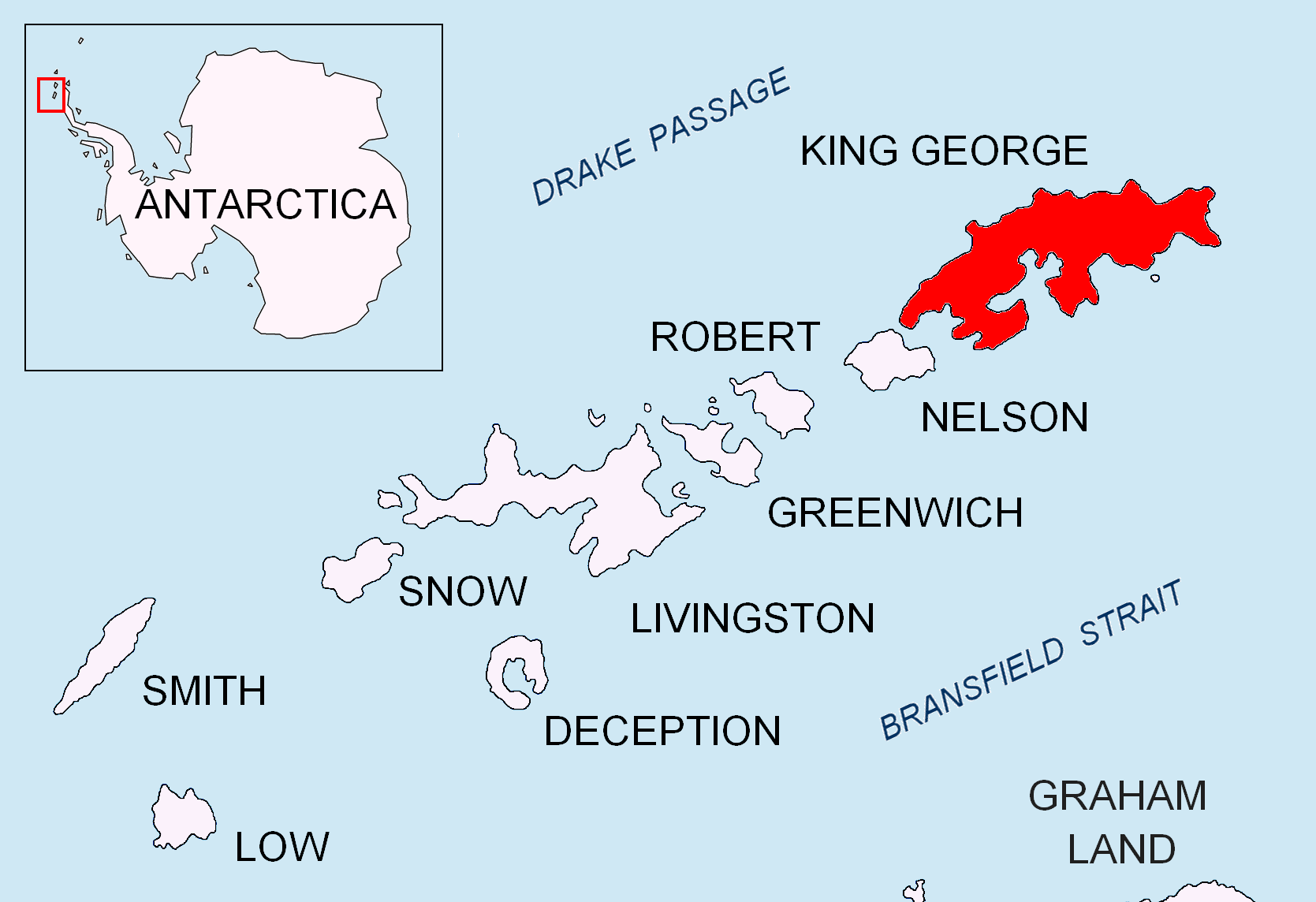
Location of King George Island in the South Shetland Islands.

The station is named for the 19th-century Russian explorer of the Antarctic Fabian von Bellingshausen.

In October 2018, it was the site of the first attempted murder in Antarctica.

== Climate ==
The Antarctic Peninsula and its nearby islands are considered to have the mildest living conditions in Antarctica. Bellingshausen Station's climate is strongly influenced by the surrounding ocean. Under the Köppen system, it is one of the few locations in Antarctica classified as a tundra climate rather than an ice cap climate. Variation in temperatures are small with the coldest month, July, averaging −6.5 °C (20.3 °F) and 1.5 °C (34.7 °F) in the warmest month, January. With only 591.2 hours of sunshine per year, the weather is often unsettled and cloudy throughout the year with precipitation in the form of snow, rain and drizzle occurring often. On average, 729 mm (28.7 in) of precipitation falls per year.

Climate data for Bellingshausen Station (1968–2014)
Month	Jan	Feb	Mar	Apr	May	Jun	Jul	Aug	Sep	Oct	Nov	Dec	Year
Mean daily maximum °C (°F)	3.3 (37.9)	3.3 (37.9)	2.1 (35.8)	0.2 (32.4)	−1.5 (29.3)	−3.1 (26.4)	−3.8 (25.2)	−3.6 (25.5)	−2.0 (28.4)	−0.9 (30.4)	0.4 (32.7)	2.0 (35.6)	−0.3 (31.5)
Daily mean °C (°F)	1.5 (34.7)	1.5 (34.7)	0.4 (32.7)	−1.7 (28.9)	−3.6 (25.5)	−5.6 (21.9)	−6.5 (20.3)	−6.2 (20.8)	−4.4 (24.1)	−2.6 (27.3)	−1.1 (30.0)	0.4 (32.7)	−2.3 (27.9)
Mean daily minimum °C (°F)	0.1 (32.2)	0.1 (32.2)	−1.3 (29.7)	−3.8 (25.2)	−6.0 (21.2)	−8.3 (17.1)	−9.7 (14.5)	−9.3 (15.3)	−7.1 (19.2)	−4.7 (23.5)	−2.7 (27.1)	−1.0 (30.2)	−4.5 (23.9)
Average precipitation mm (inches)	54.4 (2.14)	66.4 (2.61)	72.1 (2.84)	65.6 (2.58)	60.6 (2.39)	53.4 (2.10)	60.5 (2.38)	62.1 (2.44)	59.8 (2.35)	54.6 (2.15)	46.7 (1.84)	46.0 (1.81)	702.2 (27.65)
Average relative humidity (%)	87.8	88.8	88.3	88.0	88.2	87.6	88.5	88.6	89.6	88.8	88.4	88.3	88.4
Mean monthly sunshine hours	89.3	66.2	54.4	28.4	13.9	3.8	9.0	28.5	48.1	70.9	83.2	95.5	591.2
Source: Arctic and Antarctic Research Institute

== Gallery ==
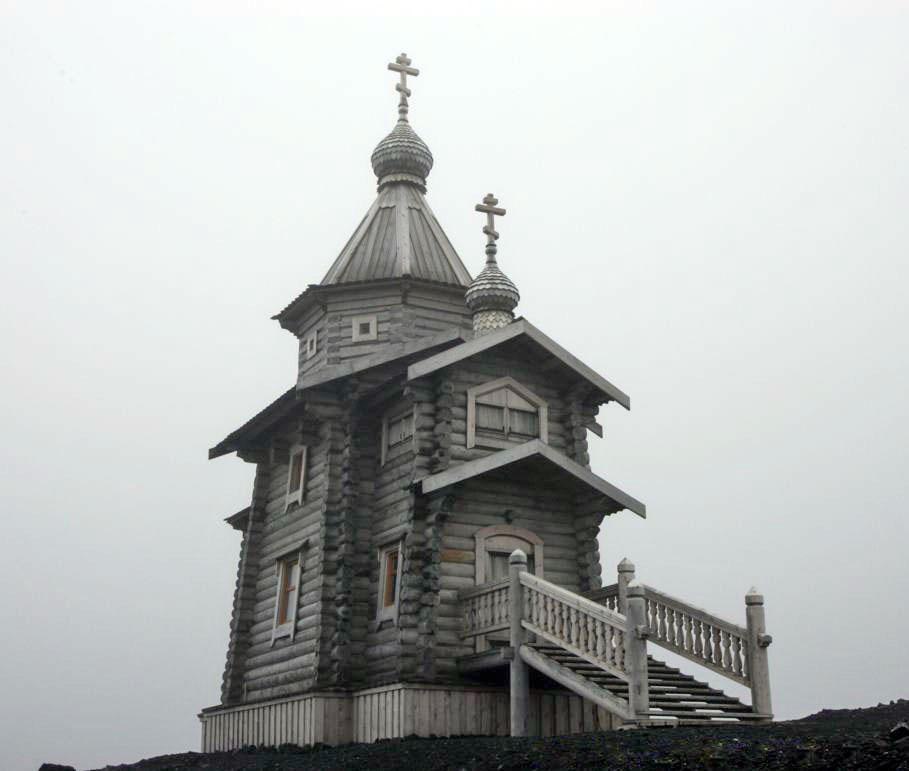
Trinity Church at Bellingshausen

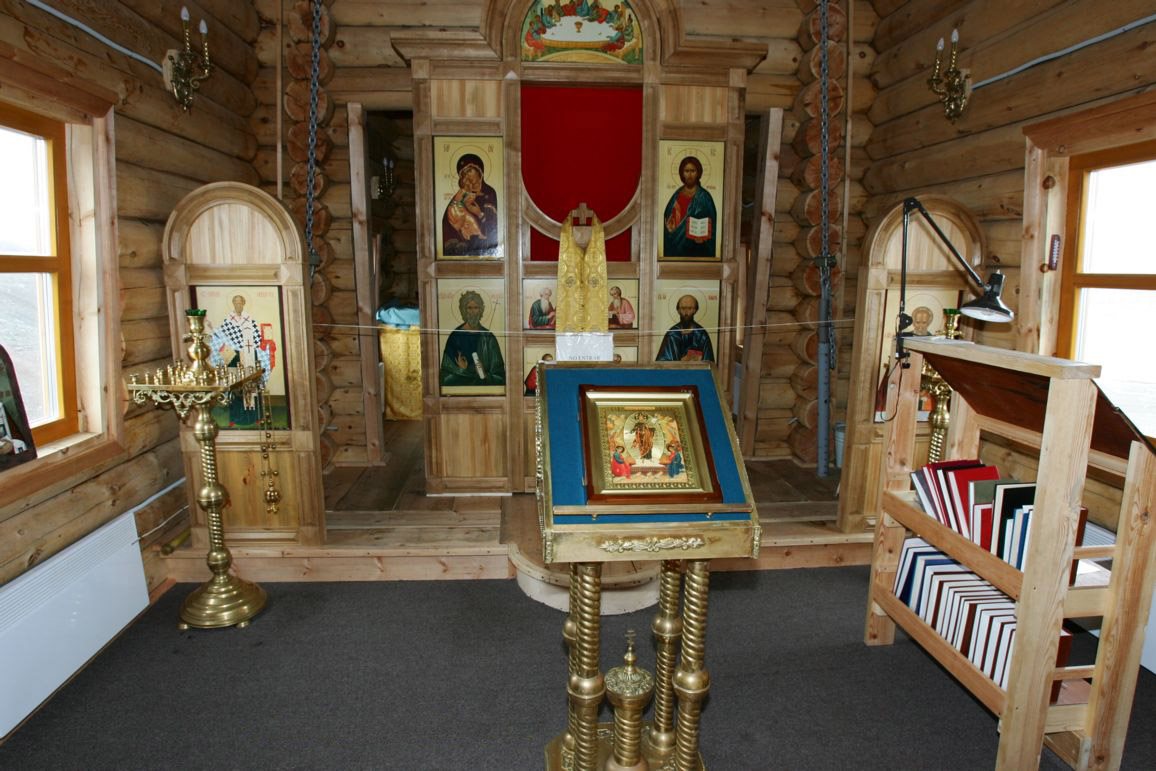
Interior of Trinity Church

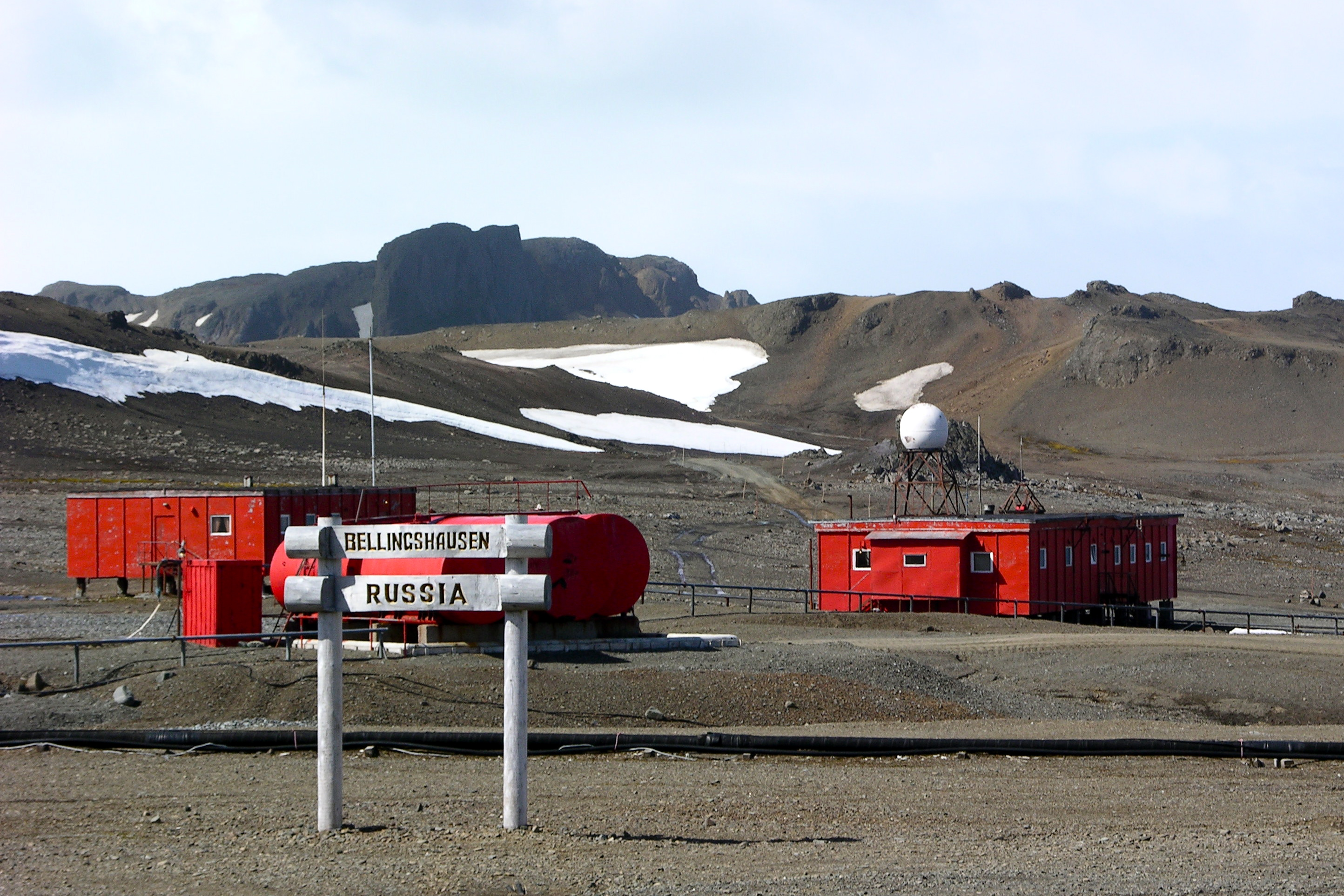
Bellingshausen in 2012

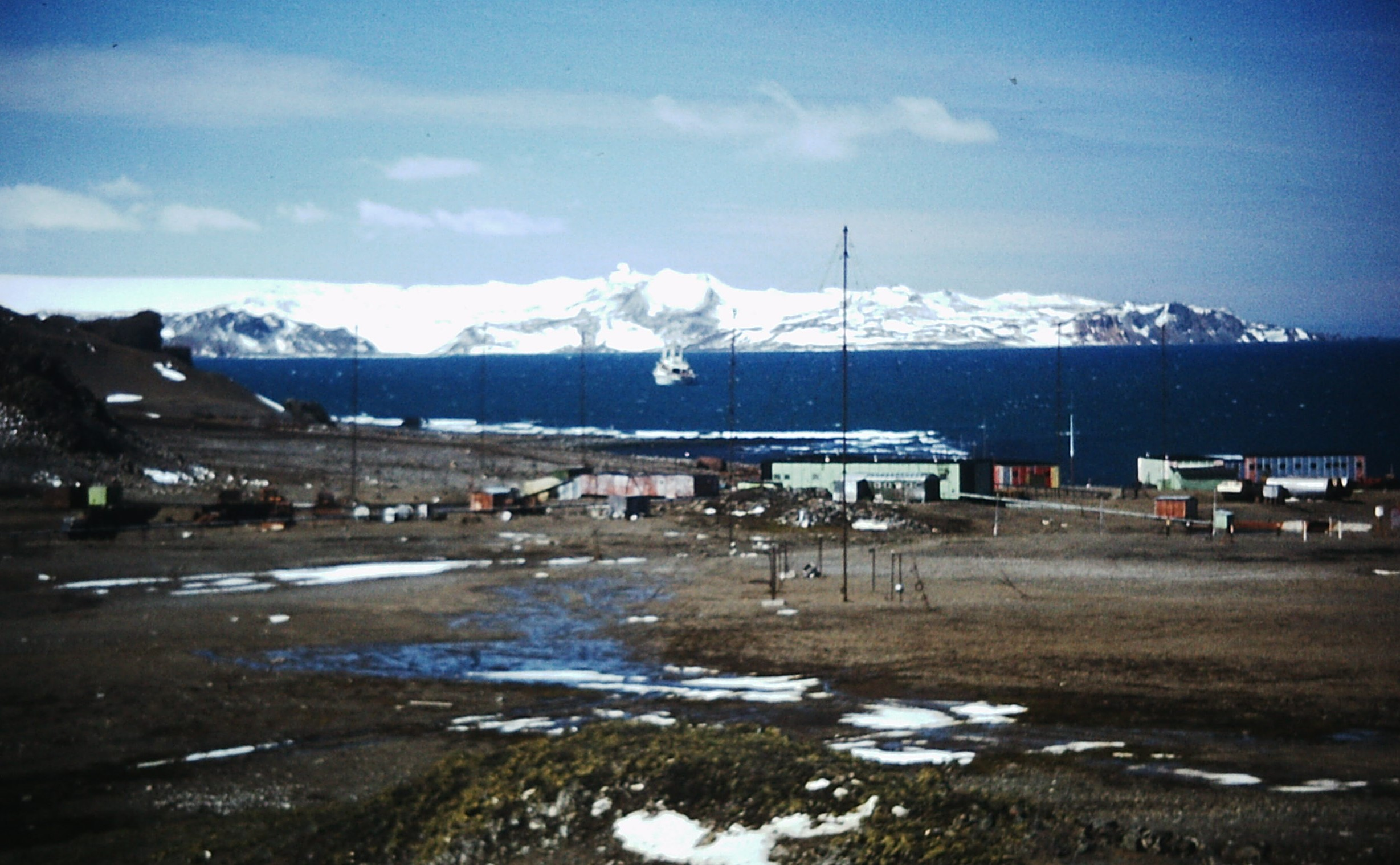
Bellingshausen in January 1985

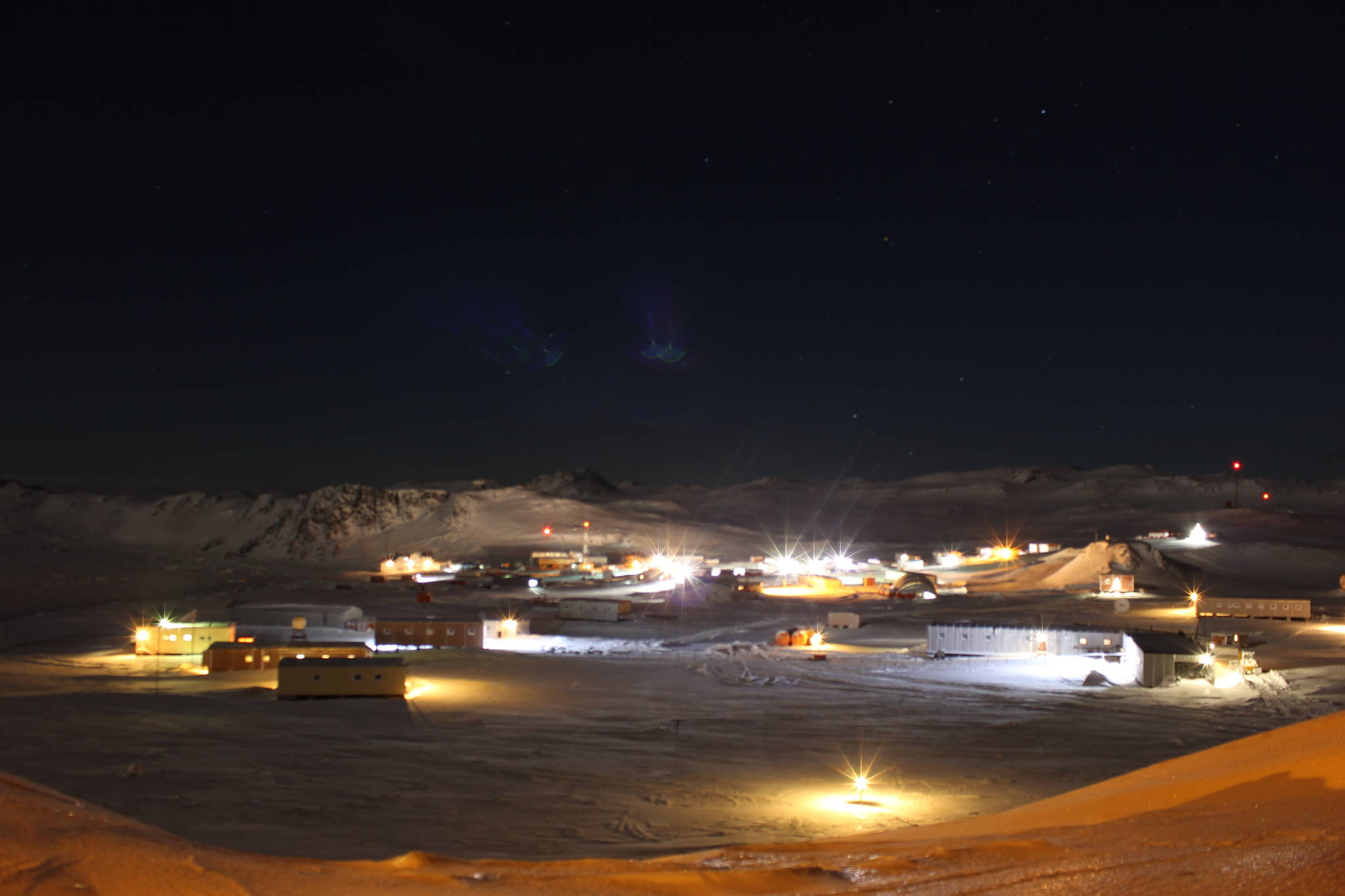
Bellingshausen at night

== In popular culture ==
On January 21, 2014, American tattoo artist Lyle Tuttle set up an impromptu tattoo station in a scientist's guesthouse where he tattooed his signature tattoo—his autograph—on project assistant/tattoo historian Dr. Anna Felicity Friedman, making him the first person to tattoo on all seven continents.

== See also ==
- List of Antarctic field camps
- List of Antarctic research stations
