= Fildes Peninsula =

Antarctic Specially Protected Area

Coordinates: 62°12′S 58°58′W

The peninsula lies at the south-western end of King George Island and is the site of several research stations.

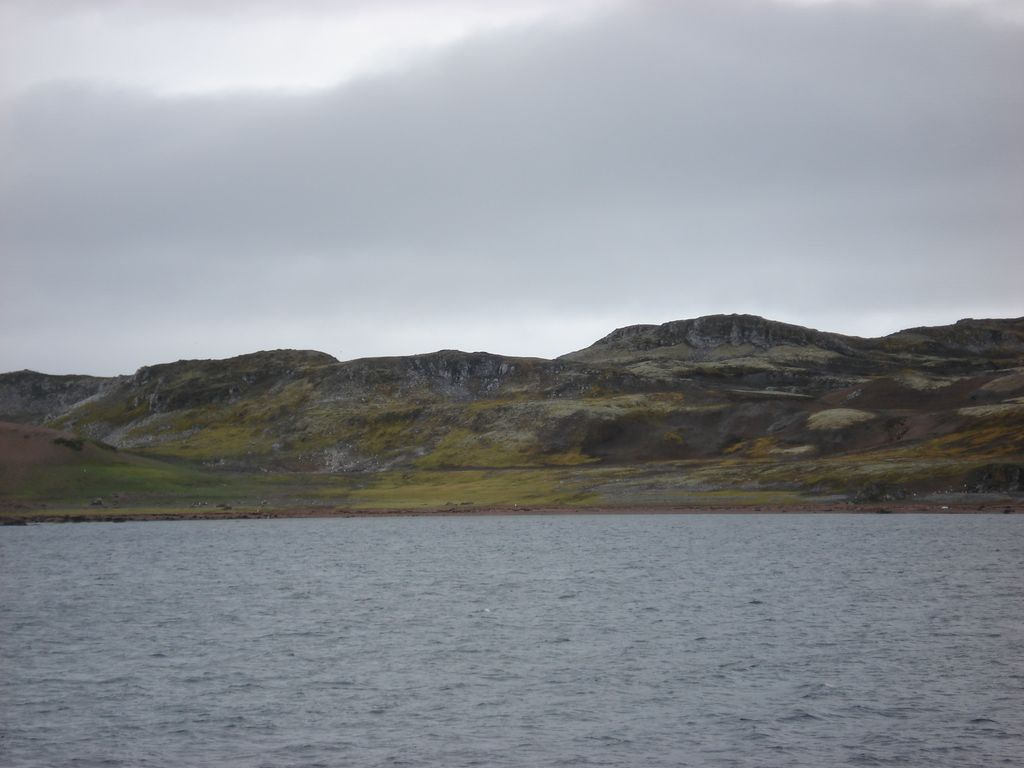
View of the peninsula from Maxwell Bay

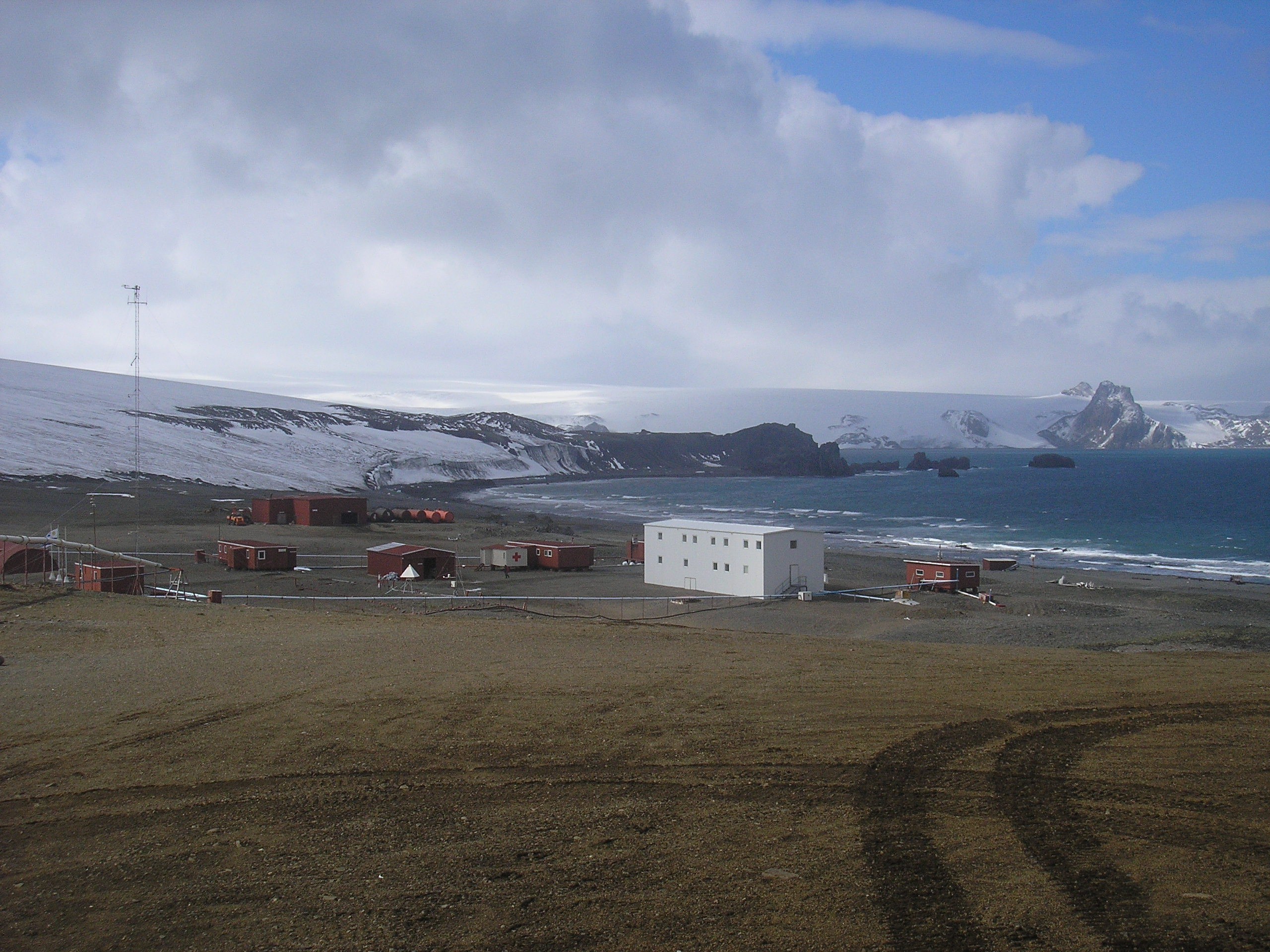
Uruguay's Artigas Bass on Maxwell Bay near the eastern end of the peninsula

The Fildes Peninsula is a 7 km (4.3 mi) long peninsula that forms the south-western end of King George Island in the South Shetland Islands of Antarctica. It was named from association with nearby Fildes Strait by the UK Antarctic Place-Names Committee in 1960; the strait was likely named for Robert Fildes, a British sealer of the 1800s.

== Description ==
The peninsula is the most extensively snow-free coastal area in summer on the island, most of which is permanently covered by ice. Its southeastern end is a point called Halfthree Point. It was charted and named by Discovery Investigations personnel on the Discovery II in 1935. It is part of the Fildes Peninsula Antarctic Specially Protected Area (ASPA 125), designated as such because of its paleontological values.

It is separated at its tip from Nelson Island by Fildes Strait, only 370 m wide at its narrowest. It is bounded on its south-east coast by Maxwell Bay, which is also known as Fildes Bay, and on its north-west by the open waters of the Southern Ocean. Geologically, the peninsula is a tableland made up of old coastal landforms, with numerous rocky outcrops and an average height of 30 m above sea level. Research stations on the peninsula include Chile’s Base Presidente Eduardo Frei Montalva and Profesor Julio Escudero Base, China’s Great Wall Station, Russia’s Bellingshausen Station and Uruguay’s Artigas Base.

Running E-W between Fildes Peninsula, King George Island, and Nelson Island, was known to the nineteenth-century sealers; charted and named Filde's [sic] Strait or Sound by Capt. Robert Fildes, English sealing captain from Liverpool, who visited the South Shetland Islands in the brig Cora, 1820–21, and in the brig Robert, 1821–22, and who prepared the first comprehensive sailing directions for the islands (Fildes, 1821c).

== Antarctic specially protected area ==
Eight separate sites on the peninsula have been collectively designated an Antarctic Specially Protected Area (ASPA 125), largely because of their paleontological values. The area contains outcrops with fossils dating from the Late Cretaceous to the Eocene, including footprints of both vertebrate and invertebrate animals, as well as plant fossils with impressions of leaves and fronds, trunks, and pollen grains and spores. Sites comprising the ASPA are Fossil Hill, Holz Stream, Glacier Dome Bellingshausen, Halfthree Point, Suffield Point, Fossil Point, Gradzinski Cove and Skua Cove.

== See also ==
- Clement Hill
- Eddy Point
- Saunders Valley
