= List of songs recorded by Jimi Hendrix =

Songs recorded by Jimi Hendrix

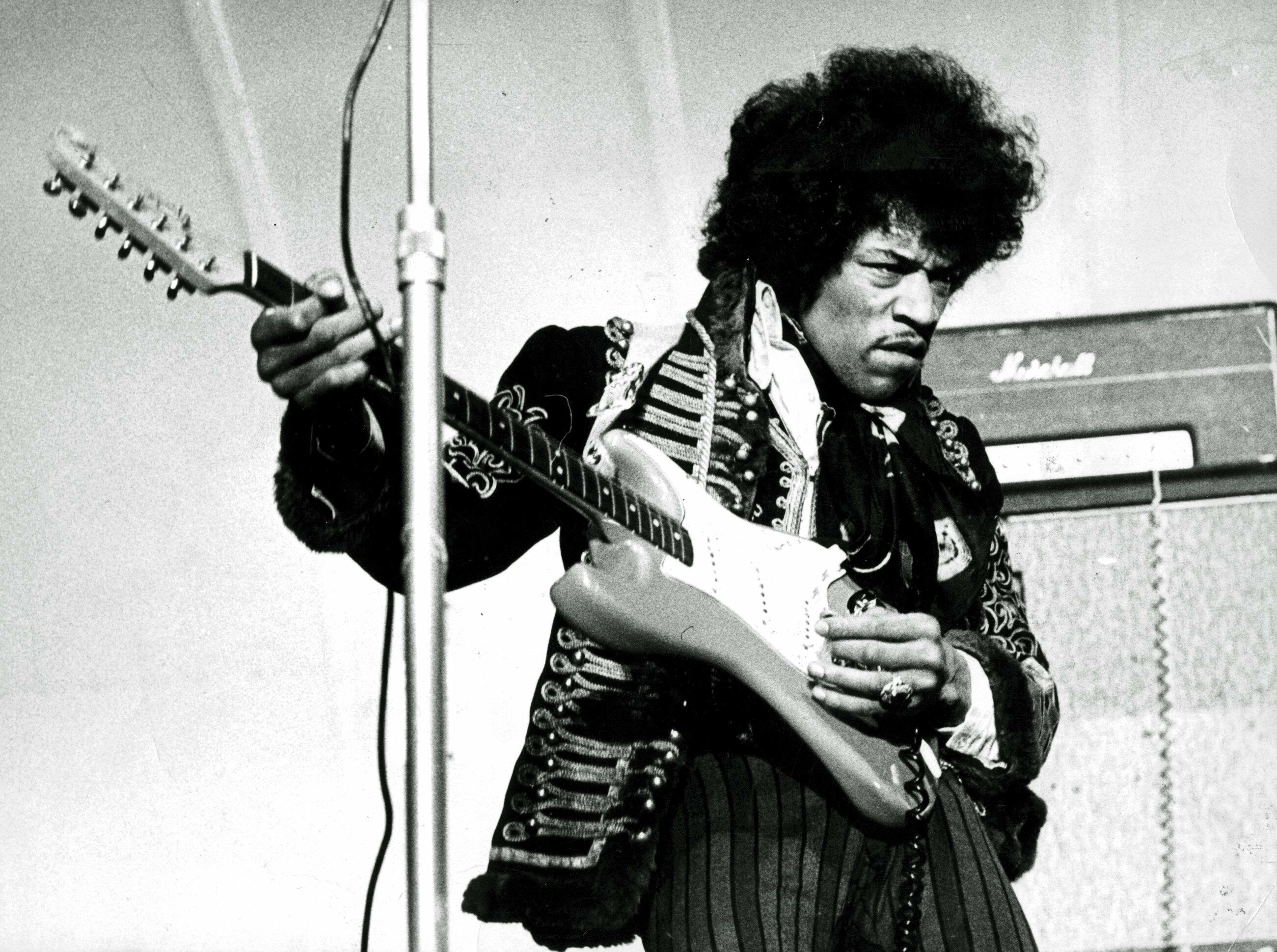
Hendrix on stage at Gröna Lund in Stockholm, Sweden in June 1967

Jimi Hendrix (1942–1970) was an American musician who recorded over 170 different songs during his career from 1966 to 1970. Often considered one of the most accomplished and influential electric guitarists, Hendrix wrote most of his own material in a variety of styles. Some show his blues and R&B roots and others incorporate jazz and early funk influences. Some songs, such as "Purple Haze", "Voodoo Child (Slight Return)", and "Machine Gun", feature his guitar-dominated hard and psychedelic rock sound, while others including "The Wind Cries Mary" and "Little Wing" take a slower, more melodic approach. Two of his best-known single releases were written by others: "Hey Joe" by Billy Roberts and "All Along the Watchtower" by Bob Dylan. Hendrix supplied his own interpretations, however, which gave them a much different character than the originals.

Hendrix was known for his live performances. While he often played the numbers from his studio albums, several released songs exist only in live recordings. His radical interpretation of "The Star-Spangled Banner", which he performed at the 1969 Woodstock music festival, was a highlight of the event's 1970 documentary film, becoming "part of the sixties Zeitgeist." The live "Machine Gun" is often lauded as Hendrix's greatest achievement, in which he used the guitar to create sounds of a battlefield and noises similar to explosions, bombs dropping, and machine guns. Other songs only performed in concert show his interest in different styles of music. These include interpretations of blues songs by artists such as Howlin' Wolf ("Killing Floor"), B.B. King ("Rock Me Baby"), and Muddy Waters ("Catfish Blues"); the early rock and roll numbers "Johnny B. Goode" and "Blue Suede Shoes"; as well as the more contemporary rock "Sunshine of Your Love" and "Dear Mr. Fantasy".

At the time of his death, Hendrix was writing and recording for a planned fourth studio album. Songs such as "Freedom" and "Hey Baby (New Rising Sun)" signaled a new direction in Hendrix's music, which included a more integrated mix of hard rock with elements of R&B and multiple guitar parts. He also left behind a large number of partially completed songs, demos, and jams in a variety of styles, which continue to be issued. Although he toured and mostly recorded as a three-piece, (Note: The Jimi Hendrix Experience, the Band of Gypsys, and the Cry of Love Tour band were all three-piece combos, often called "power trios".) several Hendrix songs featured additional musicians, such as background vocalists, percussionists, and keyboardists. The long studio jam "Voodoo Chile", which Hendrix developed into "Voodoo Child (Slight Return)", was recorded with organist Steve Winwood and bassist Jack Casady. Jamming was integral to his songwriting process and several posthumous post-1980 albums contain songs that are largely studio jams with various players. How much of this material Hendrix would have completed or released is unknown, but nonetheless has become part of his recording legacy.

In his writings, performances, and in the recording studio, Hendrix often referred to songs using alternate titles. (Note: Hendrix usually introduced performances of "Hear My Train A Comin'" as "Get My Heart Back Together", but added a train reference such as "Lonesome Train", "I See My Train", and "Waitin' Down at the Train Station".) Record companies in the US and UK sometimes issued his songs with differences in the spelling; Track Records (UK) used "Foxy Lady", while Reprise Records (US) spelled it "Foxey Lady". Later album producers changed some titles or supplied their own, when a formal name had not been identified. (Note: Hendrix's manager, Michael Jeffery, later titled an unnamed studio jam "Pali Gap" in an attempt to make it appear related to the Hawaiian locale of his 1971 Rainbow Bridge film project.)

== Main songs (1966–1970) ==
Sixty songs were issued during Hendrix's lifetime, principally on the first three studio albums, a compilation, and a split live album under the Jimi Hendrix Experience name:

- Are You Experienced (1967)
- Axis: Bold as Love (1967)
- Smash Hits (1968)
- Electric Ladyland (1968)
- Historic Performances Recorded at the Monterey International Pop Festival (1970)

Additional songs recorded live were issued on Band of Gypsys (1970) and the various artists release Woodstock: Music from the Original Soundtrack and More (1970). Two songs recorded with the Band of Gypsys lineup were issued as a single in 1970.

Key
†	Indicates song released on a single
#	Indicates song released as a live recording

List of songs with title, songwriter(s), original album release, year of release, and reference(s)
Original title	Writer(s)	Original album release	Year	Ref(s)
"3rd Stone from the Sun" (Note: "3rd Stone from the Sun" was retitled "Third Stone from the Sun" and included on the US edition of Are You Experienced.)	Jimi Hendrix	Are You Experienced	1967	
"51st Anniversary"^{†}	Hendrix	Smash Hits (UK edition) (Note: "51st Anniversary" was released as the B-side of "Purple Haze" in the UK.)	1967	
"1983... (A Merman I Should Turn to Be)"	Hendrix	Electric Ladyland	1968	
"Ain't No Telling"	Hendrix	Axis: Bold as Love	1967	
"All Along the Watchtower"^{†}	Bob Dylan	Electric Ladyland (Note: "Hey Joe", "Stone Free", "Purple Haze", "The Wind Cries Mary", "Burning of the Midnight Lamp", "All Along the Watchtower", "Crosstown Traffic", and "Gypsy Eyes" were released as single A- or B-sides in both the US and UK.)	1968	
"...And the Gods Made Love"	Hendrix	Electric Ladyland	1968	
"Are You Experienced?"	Hendrix	Are You Experienced	1967	
"Bold as Love"	Hendrix	Axis: Bold as Love	1967	
"Burning of the Midnight Lamp"^{†}	Hendrix	Smash Hits (UK edition)	1967	
"Can You See Me"	Hendrix	Are You Experienced (UK edition) (Note: "Can You See Me" was included on both UK and US editions of Smash Hits.)	1967	
"Castles Made of Sand"	Hendrix	Axis: Bold as Love	1967	
"Changes"^{#}	Buddy Miles	Band of Gypsys	1970	
"Come On (Part I)" (Note: "Come On (Part 1)" was retitled "Come On" for the UK edition of Electric Ladyland. It was also subtitled "Let the Good Times Roll" and released as a single.)	Earl King	Electric Ladyland	1968	
"Crosstown Traffic"^{†} (Note: "Crosstown Traffic" appears as "Cross Town Traffic" on the UK edition LP label of Electric Ladyland.)	Hendrix	Electric Ladyland	1968	
"Electric Ladyland" (Note: "Have You Ever Been (To Electric Ladyland)" appears as "Electric Ladyland" on the UK edition gatefold of Electric Ladyland.): see "Have You Ever Been (To Electric Ladyland)"				
"EXP"	Hendrix	Axis: Bold as Love	1967	
"Fire"^{†} (Note: "Fire" was retitled "Let Me Light Your Fire" for a UK 1969 single.)	Hendrix	Are You Experienced	1967	
"Foxy Lady"^{†} (Note: "Foxy Lady" was retitled as "Foxey Lady" and included on the US edition of Are You Experienced.)	Hendrix	Are You Experienced	1967	
"Gypsy Eyes"^{†} (Note: "Gypsy Eyes" was retitled "Gipsy Eyes" and included on the UK edition of Electric Ladyland.)	Hendrix	Electric Ladyland	1968	
"Have You Ever Been (To Electric Ladyland)"	Hendrix	Electric Ladyland	1968	
"Hey Joe"^{†}	Billy Roberts	Are You Experienced (US edition)	1966	
"Highway Chile"^{†}	Hendrix	Smash Hits (UK edition) (Note: "Highway Chile" was released as the B-side to "The Wind Cries Mary" in the UK.)	1967	
"House Burning Down"	Hendrix	Electric Ladyland	1968	
"I Don't Live Today"	Hendrix	Are You Experienced	1967	
"If Six Was Nine"^{†} (Note: "If Six Was Nine" was retitled "If 6 Was 9" and included on the US edition of Axis: Bold as Love.)	Hendrix	Axis: Bold as Love (Note: "If 6 Was 9" was released as the B-side to "Stone Free" in the US.)	1967	
"Instrumental Solo" (Note: "Villanova Junction" was titled "Instrumental Solo" on the Woodstock film soundtrack.): see "Villanova Junction"				
"Izabella"^{†}	Hendrix	War Heroes (Note: "Stepping Stone" and "Izabella" were released on a single in the US. They were subsequently reworked and included on War Heroes.)	1970	
"Like a Rolling Stone"^{#}	Bob Dylan	Historic Performances	1970	
"Little Miss Lover"	Hendrix	Axis: Bold as Love	1967	
"Little Miss Strange"	Noel Redding	Electric Ladyland	1968	
"Little Wing"	Hendrix	Axis: Bold as Love	1967	
"Long Hot Summer Night"^{†}	Hendrix	Electric Ladyland (Note: "Long Hot Summer Night" was released as the B-side to "All Along the Watchtower" in the UK.)	1968	
"Love or Confusion"	Hendrix	Are You Experienced	1967	
"Machine Gun"^{#}	Hendrix	Band of Gypsys	1970	
"Manic Depression"	Hendrix	Are You Experienced	1967	
"May This Be Love"	Hendrix	Are You Experienced	1967	
"Message of Love"^{#} (Note: The original Capitol Band of Gypsys album listed the song title as "Message of Love". However, Track (UK), Barclay (France), and others used "Message to Love". A different take titled "Message to the Universe" was included on South Saturn Delta.)	Hendrix	Band of Gypsys	1970	
"Moon, Turn the Tides...Gently Gently Away"	Hendrix	Electric Ladyland	1968	
"One Rainy Wish"^{†}	Hendrix	Axis: Bold as Love (Note: "One Rainy Wish" was released as the B-side of "Up from the Skies" in the US.)	1967	
"Power to Love"^{#} (Note: The original Capitol Band of Gypsys album listed the song title as "Power to Love". However, Track (UK), Barclay (France), and others used "Power of Soul".)	Hendrix	Band of Gypsys	1970	
"Purple Haze"^{†}	Hendrix	Are You Experienced (US edition)	1967	
"Rainy Day, Dream Away"	Hendrix	Electric Ladyland	1968	
"Red House"	Hendrix	Are You Experienced (UK edition) (Note: A different take of "Red House" was included on the US edition of Smash Hits.)	1967	
"Remember"	Hendrix	Are You Experienced (UK edition) (Note: "Remember" was included on the US edition of Smash Hits.)	1967	
"Rock Me Baby"^{#}	B.B. King	Historic Performances	1970	
"She's So Fine"	Noel Redding	Axis: Bold as Love	1967	
"Spanish Castle Magic"	Hendrix	Axis: Bold as Love	1967	
"Star Spangled Banner"^{#}	Traditional (arr. by Hendrix)	Woodstock: Music from the Original Soundtrack and More (Note: Woodstock: Music from the Original Soundtrack and More and Woodstock Two include songs by various artists.)	1970	
"The Stars That Play with Laughing Sam's Dice"^{†}	Hendrix	Smash Hits (UK edition) (Note: "The Stars That Play with Laughing Sam's Dice" was released as the B-side to "Burning of the Midnight Lamp" in the UK.)	1967	
"Stepping Stone"^{†}	Hendrix	War Heroes	1970	
"Still Raining, Still Dreaming"	Hendrix	Electric Ladyland	1968	
"Stone Free"^{†}	Hendrix	Smash Hits	1966	
"Third Stone from the Sun": see "3rd Stone from the Sun"				
"Up from the Skies"^{†}	Hendrix	Axis: Bold as Love (Note: "Up from the Skies" was as a single in the US.)	1967	
"Villanova Junction"^{#}	Hendrix	Woodstock: Music from the Original Soundtrack and More	1970	
"Voodoo Child (Slight Return)"^{†} (Note: "Voodoo Child (Slight Return)" was retitled "Voodoo Chile (Slight Return)" and included on the UK edition of Electric Ladyland. It was released as a single in the UK with the title "Voodoo Chile".)	Hendrix	Electric Ladyland	1968	
"Voodoo Chile" (Note: A composite of two different takes titled "Voodoo Chile Blues" was included on Blues.)	Hendrix	Electric Ladyland	1968	
"Wait Until Tomorrow"	Hendrix	Axis: Bold as Love	1967	
"We Gotta Live Together"^{#}	Buddy Miles	Band of Gypsys	1970	
"Who Knows"^{#}	Hendrix	Band of Gypsys	1970	
"Wild Thing"^{#}	Chip Taylor	Historic Performances	1970	
"The Wind Cries Mary"^{†}	Hendrix	Are You Experienced (US edition)	1967	
"You've Got Me Floating" (Note: "You've Got Me Floating" was retitled "You Got Me Floatin'" and included on the US edition of Axis: Bold as Love.)	Hendrix	Axis: Bold as Love	1967	

== Songs released posthumously (1971–present) ==
At the time of his death, Hendrix had a large number of songs in various stages of recording. Some were for a planned fourth studio album; 15 songs from his proposed track listings were released on the first three posthumous Hendrix albums produced by longtime associates recording engineer Eddie Kramer and drummer Mitch Mitchell:

- The Cry of Love (1971)
- Rainbow Bridge (1971)
- War Heroes (1972)

Beginning in 1975, more unfinished songs were released on albums produced by Alan Douglas. Most of the original recordings were edited and often had overdubs by musicians who had never played with Hendrix. In 1997, Experience Hendrix, a family company, took control of his recording legacy. Its first release, First Rays of the New Rising Sun (1997), combined songs from the 1971–1972 albums in the most complete attempt at presenting his unfinished fourth studio album. Experience Hendrix continues to issue additional unfinished songs, alternate takes, demos, and jams (including restored recordings from the Douglas era). All songs listed are from official releases.

Key
†	Indicates song released on a single
#	Indicates song released as a live recording

List of songs with title, songwriter(s), original album release, year of release, and reference(s)
Original title	Writer(s)	Original album release	Year	Ref(s)
"3 Little Bears"	Jimi Hendrix	War Heroes	1972	
"12 Bar with Horns"^{†}	Hendrix	Non-album single B-side of "Love or Confusion"	2010	
"$20 Fine"	Stephen Stills	Both Sides of the Sky	2018	
"Acoustic Demo"	Hendrix	Morning Symphony Ideas	2000	
"All God's Children"	Hendrix	West Coast Seattle Boy	2010	
"Angel"^{†} (Note: Earlier demo versions titled "Sweet Angel" were later released on South Saturn Delta and the Jimi Hendrix Experience box set.)	Hendrix	The Cry of Love	1971	
"Angel Caterina" (Note: The "Angel Caterina", recorded March 13, 1968, and included as a bonus track on the Electric Ladyland 50th Anniversary Edition is a forerunner of "1983" and is different than "My Angel Catherina (Return of Little Wing)", which became "Angel".): See "1983... (A Merman I Should Turn to Be)"				
"Astro Man"	Hendrix	The Cry of Love	1971	
"Auld Lang Syne"	Traditional (adapted by Hendrix)	... And a Happy New Year (EP)	1974	
"Baggy's Jam"	Hendrix	The Baggy's Rehearsal Sessions	2002	
"Beginning"^{#} (Note: "Beginning" was titled "Jam Back at the House" on Woodstock Two.)	Mitch Mitchell (Note: Mitch Mitchell is credited with "Beginning" on War Heroes. Hendrix is credited with "Jam Back at the House" on Woodstock Two.)	Woodstock Two	1971	
"Belly Button Window"	Hendrix	The Cry of Love	1971	
"Bleeding Heart"^{#}	Elmore James (Note: "Bleeding Heart" is credited to "Robinson" on Experience and More Experience (Bobby Robinson was Elmore James' producer); Hendrix received the credit on War Heroes, The Jimi Hendrix Concerts, and South Saturn Delta; Blues lists "Traditional, Arranged by Jimi Hendrix"; and Elmore James is credited on Valleys of Neptune and People, Hell and Angels.)	Experience	1971	
"Blue Suede Shoes"^{#}	Carl Perkins	Hendrix in the West	1972	
"Blue Window"	Hendrix	Martin Scorsese Presents the Blues	2003	
"Blues Jam at Olympic"	Hendrix	Hear My Music	2004	
"Bolero"	Hendrix	West Coast Seattle Boy	2010	
"Born Under a Bad Sign"	Booker T. Jones; William Bell	Blues	1994	
"Burning Desire"	Hendrix	Loose Ends	1974	
"Calling All the Devil's Children"^{†}	Hendrix	West Coast Seattle Boy (Note: "Calling All the Devil's Children" was released as the B-side of "Come On (Let The Good Times Roll)".)	2010	
"Can You Please Crawl Out Your Window?"^{†#}	Bob Dylan	BBC Sessions	1998	
"Captain Coconut": See "MLK"				
"Cat Talking to Me"	Hendrix	West Coast Seattle Boy	2010	
"Catfish Blues"^{#} (Note: "Catfish Blues" is a medley of songs by Muddy Waters.)	McKinley Morganfield (a.k.a. Muddy Waters) (Note: Songwriter credit for "Catfish Blues" is sometimes listed as Robert Petway or "Traditional Arranged by Jimi Hendrix".)	Radio One	1988	
"Cherokee Mist"	Hendrix	The Jimi Hendrix Experience	2000	
"Come Down Hard on Me Baby"	Hendrix	Loose Ends	1974	
"Country Blues"	Hendrix	The Jimi Hendrix Experience	2000	
"Crash Landing"	Hendrix	People, Hell and Angels (Note: An edited version of "Crash Landing" was used as the title track for the Alan Douglas-produced album.)	2013	
"Crying Blue Rain"	Hendrix	Valleys of Neptune	2010	
"Day Tripper"^{#}	John Lennon; Paul McCartney	Radio One	1988	
"Dear Mr. Fantasy"^{#}	Jim Capaldi; Steve Winwood; Chris Wood	Paris 1967/San Francisco 1968	2003	
"Dolly Dagger"^{†}	Hendrix	Rainbow Bridge	1971	
"Drifter's Escape"	Bob Dylan	Loose Ends	1974	
"Drifting"	Hendrix	The Cry of Love	1971	
"Drivin' South"^{#}	Curtis McNear (a.k.a. Curtis Knight)	Radio One	1988	
"Drone Blues"	Hendrix	Hear My Music (Note: Edited versions of "Drone Blues", "Easy Blues", "Jimi Jimmy Jam", and "Young/Hendrix" were included on the Alan Douglas-produced album Nine to the Universe.)	2004	
"Earth Blues"	Hendrix	Rainbow Bridge	1971	
"Easy Blues"	Hendrix	People, Hell and Angels	2013	
"Electric Church Red House" (Note: "Electric Church Red House" is a composite of a jam called "Electric Church" and "Red House", recorded with organist Lee Michaels at TTG Studios.)	Hendrix	Blues	1994	
"Ezy Ryder"	Hendrix	The Cry of Love	1971	
"Farther Up the Road"	Hendrix	Electric Lady Studios: A Jimi Hendrix Vision	2024	
"Freedom"^{†}	Hendrix	The Cry of Love	1971	
"Georgia Blues"	Hendrix	Martin Scorsese Presents the Blues	2003	
"Getting My Heart Back Together Again" (Note: "Hear My Train A Comin'" was titled "Get My Heart Back Together" on Woodstock Two.): see "Hear My Train A Comin'"				
"Gloria"	Van Morrison	Gloria (EP UK) (Note: A 7-inch 33 1/3 rpm one-sided EP with "Gloria" was included with the UK edition of The Essential Jimi Hendrix and the US edition of The Essential Jimi Hendrix Volume Two. "Gloria" was later added to the combined CD The Essential Jimi Hendrix Volumes One and Two.)	1978	
"Gypsy Blood"	Hendrix	Hear My Music	2004	
"Gypsy Boy" (Note: "Hey Baby" is sometimes titled "New Rising Sun", although that is also the title of a different earlier demo; another different take, titled "Hey Gypsy Boy", was included on People, Hell and Angels.): see "Hey Baby"				
"Hear My Freedom"	Hendrix	West Coast Seattle Boy	2010	
"Hear My Train A Comin'"^{#}	Hendrix	Woodstock Two	1971	
"Heaven Has No Sorrow"	Hendrix	Electric Lady Studios: A Jimi Hendrix Vision	2024	
"Here He Comes" (Note: A studio version of "Lover Man", titled "Here He Comes (Lover Man)", was included on South Saturn Delta and The Jimi Hendrix Experience box set.): see "Lover Man"				
"Hey Baby (New Rising Sun)"	Hendrix	Rainbow Bridge	1971	
"Hound Dog"^{#}	Jerry Leiber; Mike Stoller	Radio One	1988	
"Hound Dog Blues"	Hendrix	West Coast Seattle Boy	2010	
"I Was Made to Love Her"^{#}	Stevie Wonder; Lula Mae Hardaway; Henry Cosby; Sylvia Moy	BBC Sessions	1998	
"I'm Your Hoochie Coochie Man"	Willie Dixon	Loose Ends	1974	
"In from the Storm"	Hendrix	The Cry of Love	1971	
"Inside Out"	Hendrix	People, Hell and Angels	2013	
"It's Too Bad"	Hendrix	The Jimi Hendrix Experience	2000	
"Jam 292"^{†} (Note: A different take of "Jam 292" titled "Jelly 292" was included on Blues and a more complete version was included on Hear My Music.)	Hendrix	Loose Ends	1974	
"Jam Back at the House": see "Beginning"				
"Jammin'"^{#}	Hendrix	BBC Sessions	1998	
"Jimi/Jimmy Jam"	Hendrix	Hear My Music	2004	
"Johnny B. Goode"^{†#}	Chuck Berry	Hendrix in the West	1972	
"Jungle"	Hendrix	Morning Symphony Ideas	2000	
"Keep On Grooving"	Hendrix	Morning Symphony Ideas	2000	
"Killing Floor"^{#}	Chester Burnett (a.k.a. Howlin' Wolf)	Kiss the Sky	1984	
"Let Me Move You"	Hendrix	People, Hell and Angels	2013	
"The Little Drummer Boy" / "Silent Night" (medley)	Katherine K. Davis; Henry Onorati; Harry Simeone; Josef Mohr; Franz Gruber (adapted by Hendrix)	... And a Happy New Year (EP)	1974	
"Little One"	Hendrix	West Coast Seattle Boy	2010	
"Lonely Avenue"	Hendrix	West Coast Seattle Boy	2010	
"The Long Medley"	Hendrix	Electric Lady Studios: A Jimi Hendrix Vision	2024	
"Look Over Yonder" (Note: An earlier take of "Look Over Yonder", titled "Mr. Bad Luck", was later included on Valleys of Neptune and West Coast Seattle Boy.)	Hendrix	Rainbow Bridge	1971	
"Lover Man"^{†#}	Hendrix	Isle of Wight	1971	
"Lullaby for the Summer" (Note: A different take of "Lullaby for the Summer" was titled "Touch You" and released as the B-side of "Fire" in the UK.)	Hendrix	Valleys of Neptune	2010	
"Mannish Boy"^{†}	McKinley Morganfield (a.k.a. Muddy Waters); Mel London; Ellas McDaniel (a.k.a. Bo Diddley)	Both Sides of the Sky (Note: An edited version of "Mannish Boy" was included on the Alan Douglas-produced Blues.)	2018	
"Mastermind"	Larry Lee	West Coast Seattle Boy	2010	
"Messenger"	Hendrix	West Coast Seattle Boy	2010	
"Messing Around"	Hendrix	Electric Lady Studios: A Jimi Hendrix Vision	2024	
"Midnight" (Note: A somewhat longer version of "Midnight", titled "Trash Man", was recorded two days later and was released on Hear My Music as well as on a single. An edited version of "Trash Man" was included on the Alan Douglas-produced album Midnight Lightning.)	Hendrix	War Heroes	1972	
"Midnight Lightning"^{#}	Hendrix	Isle of Wight	1971	
"MLK" (Note: "MLK" is part of a 20-minute jam titled "Ezy Ryder/MLK jam" (from 13:50 to 17:20). Alan Douglas produced an edited segment titled "Captain Coconut", which was included on Crash Landing.)	Hendrix	Burning Desire	2006	
"Mr. Bad Luck": see "Look Over Yonder"				
"My Friend"	Hendrix	The Cry of Love	1971	
"New Rising Sun" (Note: An edited version of "New Rising Sun" was released on the Alan Douglas-produced Voodoo Soup. The instrumental is "vastly different both in sound and scope from the 'Hey Baby (Land of the New Rising Sun)' later featured as part of Rainbow Bridge".)	Hendrix	West Coast Seattle Boy	2010	
"Night Bird Flying"^{†}	Hendrix	The Cry of Love	1971	
"Once I Had a Woman"	Hendrix	Blues (Note: An edited version of "Once I Had a Woman" was included on the Alan Douglas-produced album Midnight Lightning.)	1994	
"Pali Gap"	Hendrix	Rainbow Bridge	1971	
"Pass It On (Straight Ahead)" (Note: "Straight Ahead" was titled "Pass It On (Straight Ahead)" on Live at Berkeley.): see "Straight Ahead"				
"Peace in Mississippi"^{†}	Hendrix	The Jimi Hendrix Experience (2013 reissue) (Note: Edited versions of "Peace in Mississippi" were included on the Alan Douglas-produced albums Crash Landing and Voodoo Soup. It was also released as the B-side of "Bleeding Heart" in the UK.)	2010	
"Peter Gunn" / "Catastrophe" (medley)	Henry Mancini (arr. by Hendrix) (Note: "Catastrophe" is a loose parody of "Jalousie" composed by Jacob Gade with lyrics by Vera Bloom and recorded in 1951 by Frankie Laine.)	War Heroes	1972	
"Play That Riff (Thank You)"	Hendrix	West Coast Seattle Boy	2010	
"The Queen"^{#} (Note: "The Queen" is Hendrix's adaptation of "God Save the Queen".)	Traditional (arr. by Hendrix)	Hendrix in the West	1972	
"Radio One Theme"^{#}	Hendrix	Radio One	1988	
"Record Plant 2X"	Hendrix	Burning Desire	2006	
"Room Full of Mirrors"^{#}	Hendrix	Experience	1971	
"Scorpio Woman"	Hendrix	Morning Symphony Ideas	2000	
"Send My Love to Linda"	Hendrix	Both Sides of the Sky	2018	
"Sergeant Pepper's Lonely Hearts Club Band"^{#}	John Lennon; Paul McCartney	Hendrix in the West	1972	
"Shame, Shame, Shame"	Hendrix	West Coast Seattle Boy	2010	
"Ships Passing Through the Night"	Hendrix	Valleys of Neptune	2010	
"Slow Blues"	Hendrix	The Jimi Hendrix Experience	2000	
"Slow Time Blues"	Hendrix	Burning Desire	2006	
"Slow Version"	Hendrix	Hear My Music	2004	
"Smashing of Amps"^{#}	Hendrix	Experience	1971	
"Snowballs at My Window" (Note: In his handwritten lyrics, Hendrix used the title "Our Lovely Home" instead of "Snowballs at My Window".)	Hendrix	Electric Ladyland (50th Anniversary Edition)	2018	
"Somewhere"^{†} (Note: An edited version of "Somewhere", titled "Somewhere Over the Rainbow", was included on the Alan Douglas-produced album Crash Landing.)	Hendrix	The Jimi Hendrix Experience	2000	
"South Saturn Delta"	Hendrix	South Saturn Delta	1997	
"Steal Away"^{#}	Jimmy Hughes	Songs for Groovy Children: The Fillmore East Concerts	2019	
"Stop"^{#}	Jerry Ragovoy; Mort Shuman	Band of Gypsys 2	1986	
"Straight Ahead"	Hendrix	The Cry of Love	1971	
"Strato Strut"	Hendrix	Morning Symphony Ideas	2000	
"Suddenly November Morning"	Hendrix	West Coast Seattle Boy	2010	
"The Sunshine of Your Love"^{#}	Pete Brown; Jack Bruce; Eric Clapton	Experience	1971	
"Sweet Angel": see "Angel"				
"Taking Care of No Business"	Hendrix	The Jimi Hendrix Experience	2000	
"Tax Free"	Bo Hansson; Janne Carlsson	War Heroes	1972	
"Tears of Rage"	Bob Dylan; Richard Manuel	West Coast Seattle Boy	2010	
"Things I Used to Do"	Eddie Jones (a.k.a. Guitar Slim)	Both Sides of the Sky	2018	
"Title #3"	Hendrix	The Jimi Hendrix Experience	2000	
"Trash Man": see "Midnight"				
"Tune X/Just Came In": see "In from the Storm"				
"Untitled Basic Track"	Hendrix	West Coast Seattle Boy	2010	
"Valleys of Neptune"^{†}	Hendrix	Valleys of Neptune	2010	
"Woodstock"	Joni Mitchell	Both Sides of the Sky	2018	
"Woodstock Improvisation"^{#}	Hendrix	Woodstock	1994	
"Young/Hendrix"	Hendrix	West Coast Seattle Boy	2010	

== See also ==
- Jimi Hendrix discography
- Jimi Hendrix posthumous discography
- Jimi Hendrix videography

== Sources ==
- Belmo; Loveless, Steve (1998). "Song Index". Jimi Hendrix: Experience the Music. Burlington, Ontario: Collector's Guide Publishing. ISBN 1-896522-45-9.
- Cross, Charles R. (2005). Room Full of Mirrors: A Biography of Jimi Hendrix (1st. Trade Paperback ed.). New York City: Hyperion Books. ISBN 0-7868-8841-5.
- Geldeart, Gary; Rodham, Steve (2007). "Alphabetical track listing". Jimi Hendrix: The Studio Log. Cheshire, England: Jimpress. ISBN 978-0-9527686-4-7.
- McDermott, John (2018). Electric Ladyland (Box set booklet). Jimi Hendrix (50th Anniversary ed.). New York City: Experience Hendrix/Legacy Recordings. 19075859022.
- McDermott, John; Kramer, Eddie (1992). Hendrix: Setting the Record Straight. New York City: Warner Books. ISBN 0-446-39431-9.
- McDermott, John; Kramer, Eddie; Cox, Billy (2009). Ultimate Hendrix. New York City: Backbeat Books. ISBN 978-0-87930-938-1.
- Moskowitz, David (2010). The Words and Music of Jimi Hendrix. Santa Barbara, California: ABC-CLIO. ISBN 978-0-313-37592-7.
- Shadwick, Keith (2003). Jimi Hendrix: Musician. San Francisco: Backbeat Books. ISBN 978-0879307646.
- Shapiro, Harry; Glebbeek, Cesar (1990). "Appendix 1 – Music, Sweet Music: The Discography". Jimi Hendrix: Electric Gypsy (1st. U.S. ed.). New York City: St. Martin's Press. ISBN 0-312-05861-6.
- Unterberger, Richie (2009). The Rough Guide to Jimi Hendrix. London: Rough Guides. ISBN 978-1-84836-002-0.
