= The Cry of Love Tour =

1970 concert tour by Jimi Hendrix

- Tour by Jimi Hendrix
- Poster to the concert in Philadelphia
- Location: US, Europe
- Start date: April 25, 1970
- End date: September 6, 1970 (Note: One Hendrix biographer, Steven Roby, writes that Hendrix "set out to play thirty-one cities in slightly over three months" and that the August 1 concert in Honolulu was "the final date of the U.S. Cry of Love Tour". Harry Shapiro, notes August 1 as "End of the 'Cry of Love Tour'". However, others, including John McDermott, do not distinguish between the US and European segments of the tour.)
- No. of shows: 37 (Note: Hendrix performed three songs at "Holding Together", a small benefit for Timothy Leary in New York City and is not included in the total number of shows for the tour.) (Note: The two shows on Maui were for the benefit of filming for manager Michael Jeffery's Rainbow Bridge project and are not included in the total number of shows for the tour.)

Jimi Hendrix concert chronology
- North American Tour (1969); The Cry of Love Tour (1970)

The Cry of Love Tour was a 1970 concert tour by American rock guitarist and singer Jimi Hendrix. It began on April 25, 1970, at the Forum (Note: The Forum in Inglewood, California, is frequently called the "Los Angeles Forum" or the "Forum, Los Angeles, California" because of its proximity and association with Los Angeles.) in Inglewood, California, and ended on September 6, 1970, at the Love & Peace Festival in Fehmarn, West Germany. The majority of the 37 shows were in the United States, with two each in Sweden, Denmark, and West Germany, and one in England, where Hendrix was the final act at the Isle of Wight Festival 1970.

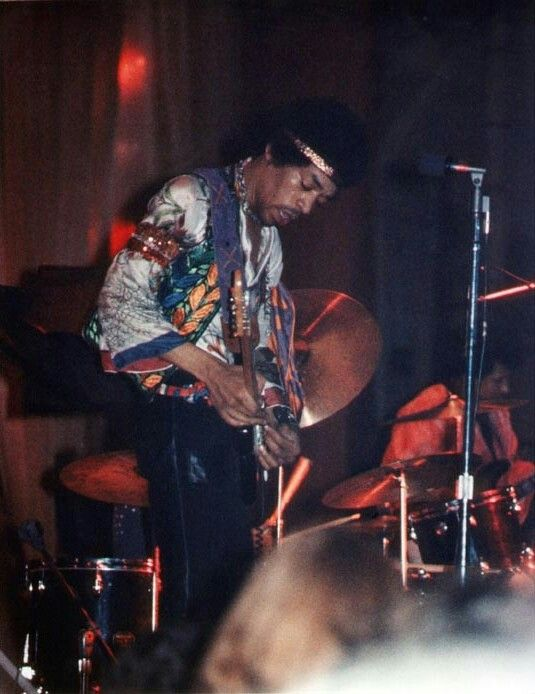
In concert June 20, 1970, San Bernardino, California

After experimenting with different lineups following the breakup of the original lineup of the Jimi Hendrix Experience, Hendrix brought back drummer Mitch Mitchell with bassist Billy Cox replacing Noel Redding to record and tour. The trio would perform older tunes along with newer material from the live Band of Gypsys album and songs that Jimi was developing for a fourth album. Soon after their performance at the Isle of Wight, the tour was cut short due to Cox's illness and Hendrix was left considering his options. However, he died twelve days after the Fehmarn concert.

Several concerts were recorded and filmed that were later released on albums and film. Since their debut in 1971, the Berkeley, Atlanta, and Isle of Wight performances have been reissued several times, most recently as Blue Wild Angel: Live at the Isle of Wight (2002), Live at Berkeley (2003), and Freedom: Atlanta Pop Festival/Jimi Hendrix: Electric Church (2015). (Note: The opening tour concert at the Forum was recorded by an amateur in the audience. Although never officially released, it is available for listening at the jimihendrix.com official website.) Concert selections continue to be included on Hendrix retrospectives and documentaries, such as Voodoo Child: The Jimi Hendrix Collection (2001), which contains five songs recorded during the tour.

== Background ==
Following Noel Redding's departure from the Experience on June 29, 1969, Hendrix called on Billy Cox, an Army buddy and early bandmate, to play bass. In July, Hendrix, Cox, and Experience drummer Mitch Mitchell moved to a rural retreat in upstate New York and began rehearsing with an expanded lineup, which included rhythm guitarist Larry Lee and percussionists Juma Sultan and Jerry Velez. One month later, the group debuted at the Woodstock festival. After a couple of gigs and recording sessions, it became apparent that the group, sometimes referred to as "Gypsy Sun and Rainbows" after a comment Hendrix made at Woodstock, was not making sufficient progress. Hendrix still wanted to experiment with a different backup but return to the trio configuration, so drummer Buddy Miles replaced Mitchell with Cox remaining on bass. However, the new trio, often called the Band of Gypsys, was similarly short-lived. Hendrix's tour manager, Gerry Stickells, believed "Jimi's own lack of commitment to the Band of Gypsys concept [was] its fatal flaw". Hendrix expressed his dissatisfaction with the subsequent Band of Gypsys live album and Cox saw it as a stopgap measure to meet a contractual obligation. With the return of Mitchell alongside Cox, Hendrix's latest group had only one member change from either the Experience or the Band of Gypsys.

Shortly before the tour began, Hendrix was interviewed for Melody Maker, the British music magazine: "I called the tour the 'Cry of Love' because that is what it's all about", which the writer also thought was the name of the new group. However, a new name was never officially adopted, but concert promoters often billed them as the "Jimi Hendrix Experience". (Note: Hendrix's most recent record releases in 1970 were credited as "Hendrix" (Band of Gypsys), "Hendrix Band of Gypsys" ("Stepping Stone" / "Izabella" Reprise Records single), and "Jimi Hendrix" (Woodstock: Music from the Original Soundtrack and More).) Hendrix explained:

I'm not sure how I feel about the Experience now. Maybe we could have gone on but what would have been the point of that—what would it have good for? It's a ghost now—it's dead—like back pages in a diary. I'm into new things and I want to think about tomorrow, not yesterday.

With the March–June 1970 releases in the US and UK of the Woodstock film and soundtrack and Band of Gypsys, Hendrix remained one of the biggest rock concert attractions: "I'd like to play some festivals but I wish they would break up the events a bit for the audiences. There's no reason why these huge crowds should not be entertained by side attractions as well." During this period, demonstrations, riots, and clashes with the police occurred at several concerts. Some of Hendrix's performances were met with demands that they be free events, such at the Berkeley Community Theatre (May 30), Swing Auditorium (June 20), Ventura County Fairgrounds (June 21), and the New York Pop Festival (July 17), where they led to violent confrontations.

At this time, Hendrix was also writing and recording songs for a planned fourth studio album. In early June after many delays, his new recording facility, Electric Lady Studios, was operational. Hendrix was able to get his manager, Michael Jeffery, to agree to limit his concert appearances to three-day weekends, so the group could return to New York City to record during the rest of the week. There were some stretches when the group took time off: they only performed twice between May 10 and June 5 (three gigs were cancelled due to illness); and twice between June 27 and July 17. The group spent most of August recording at Electric Lady, before the official opening party on August 26.

Afterwards, Hendrix departed for England and the European segment of the tour. For his first appearance in England in eighteen months, Hendrix was one of the top-billed events at Isle of Wight Festival 1970. A few dates later, Cox became ill and had to return to the US to recover. So, after performing at only seven European concerts, the tour was cancelled. Hendrix stayed in London, where he attended parties and jammed with other musicians. He was considering whether to find a new bass player and met with Chas Chandler, the producer of Are You Experienced and Axis: Bold as Love. However, Hendrix died on September 18, 1970.

== Repertoire ==
[The earlier Experience songs] may have been old to Jimi and Mitch but they were new to me. I think adding my flavor to those songs made it refreshing for Mitch and Jimi to play them again. Playing new songs like "In from the Storm" gave us a chance to take them out of Electric Lady, which was our laboratory, and see what people's reactions would be.

— Billy Cox

Throughout the tour, Hendrix continued to perform Experience material and introduced several newer songs. "Purple Haze" and "Voodoo Child (Slight Return)" were frequent concert closers; "Foxy Lady", "Red House", "Fire", and "Hey Joe" were concert staples as they had been in Experience performances. Hendrix also continued to perform popular songs that dated back to the Experience, but not yet recorded to his satisfaction, such as "Lover Man", "Hear My Train A Comin'", and "Roomful of Mirrors". From his time with Cox and Miles, he added "Machine Gun", "Message to Love", and "Ezy Ryder".

Hendrix also had a number of new songs that were still in development that he chose to include in his concerts: "Freedom" and "Hey Baby (New Rising Sun)" were among the most played new numbers; others, such as "Straight Ahead", "In from the Storm", "Dolly Dagger", and "Midnight Lightning" were performed occasionally. The songs signaled a new direction in Hendrix's music, which biographer John McDermott describes as "music of a more mature and refined Experience ... reflecting a more subtle and intricate approach". At Atlanta Pop, where they played several new songs, Hendrix was encouraged by the audience reaction. As they left the stage, he remarked to Cox, "we must be riding in the right direction".

Set lists, which identify the songs to be performed and their order, were not used by the group. According to Cox, "We never had a set list. Jimi always starts the song off. So wherever he wanted to go, that's where we went." When he wanted to extend a song, Hendrix provided a cue, such as a head or hand gesture known to Mitchell and Cox. Biographer David Moskowitz identifies the songs performed on July 26 at the Sick's Stadium in Seattle, Washington, as representative of the Cry of Love repertoire:

- "Fire"
- "Message to Love"
- "Lover Man"
- "Machine Gun"
- "The Star-Spangled Banner"
- "Purple Haze"
- "Hear My Train A Comin'"
- "Voodoo Child (Slight Return)"
- "Hey Baby (New Rising Sun)"
- "Freedom"
- "Red House"
- "Foxey Lady"

Despite being one of his best-selling singles, Hendrix usually ignored requests for "All Along the Watchtower" during his tours with the Experience. However, after the song's debut about midway through the tour on June 20, he performed it more often. Cox wished to delve deeper into Hendrix's catalogue: "I wanted to play those songs ... I wanted him to play 'Crosstown Traffic,' but we never got around to rehearsing it." However, Hendrix occasionally surprised him – at a May 16 gig at Temple University in Philadelphia, Pennsylvania, Cox recalled:

Just before we went onstage, Jimi said we were going to start the show with "Sgt. Pepper's Lonely Hearts Club Band" and "Johnny B. Goode." I just looked at him. "Sgt. Pepper" and "Johnny B. Goode"? He laughed and said "C'mon man, you know all that old shit!"

Hendrix also performed "Johnny B. Goode" at the first show on May 30 at the Berkeley Community Theatre. (Note: In 1972, the Berkeley recording of "Johnny B. Goode" was issued on the album Hendrix in the West and as a single in the UK, where it reached number 35.) During the afternoon rehearsals, the group tried out another rock and roll classic, Carl Perkins' "Blue Suede Shoes". In Europe, Hendrix reached back to his early career for a couple of performances of Howlin' Wolf's "Killing Floor" and the Muddy Waters tribute "Catfish Blues".

== Films and albums ==
Over the years, several films and albums have been released of Hendrix's concert performances during the Cry of Love tour (all are albums, except where noted):

- Jimi Plays Berkeley (film with songs from both shows on May 30, released 1971)
- Live at Berkeley (2nd show, May 30, released 2003)
- Johnny B. Goode (video & LP with songs from Berkeley on May 30 & Atlanta Pop on July 4, released 1986)
- Stages (Box set disc 4: Atlanta Pop, July 4, released 1991)
- Jimi Hendrix: At the Atlanta Pop Festival (film of Atlanta Pop, July 4, released 1992)
- Freedom: Atlanta Pop Festival (July 4, released 2015)
- Jimi Hendrix: Electric Church (film July 4, released 2015 in conjunction with Freedom)
- Rainbow Bridge (film July 30, released 1971)
- Live in Maui (July 30 both sets, released 2020)
- Isle of Wight (August 31, released 1971)
- Jimi Hendrix: At the Isle of Wight (film August 31, released 1990)
- Live Isle of Wight '70 (August 31, released 1991)
- Blue Wild Angel: Live at the Isle of Wight (film & CD August 31, released 2002)
- Live at the Isle of Fehmarn (September 6, released 2005)

Additionally, songs recorded during the tour have been released along with other live and/or studio material:

- Rainbow Bridge (1971): "Hear My Train A Comin'" (Berkeley, May 30)
- Hendrix in the West (1972): "Johnny B. Goode", "Lover Man", "Blue Suede Shoes" (Berkeley, May 30); "God Save the Queen", "Sgt. Pepper's Lonely Hearts Club Band" (Isle of Wight, August 30)
- Soundtrack Recordings from the Film Jimi Hendrix (film & LP 1973): "Johnny B. Goode", "Purple Haze" (Berkeley, May 30); "Machine Gun", "Red House", "In from the Storm" (Isle of Wight, August 30)
- The Jimi Hendrix Concerts (1982): "Red House" (New York Pop, July 17)
- Band of Gypsys 2 (1986): "Voodoo Child" (Atlanta Pop, July 4); "Stone Free", "Ezy Ryder" (Berkeley, May 30)
- Cornerstones: 1967–1970 (1990): "Fire", "Stone Free" (Atlanta Pop, July 4)
- Blues (1994): "Hear My Train A Comin'" (Berkeley, May 30)
- The Jimi Hendrix Experience (2000): "Johnny B. Goode", "Blue Suede Shoes" (Berkeley, May 30); "Hey Baby" / "In from the Storm" (Maui, July 30); "All Along the Watchtower", "In from the Storm" (Isle of Wight, August 30)
- Voodoo Child: The Jimi Hendrix Collection (2001): "Hear My Train A Comin'", "Johnny B. Goode" (Berkeley, May 30); "Red House" (New York Pop, July 17); "Foxey Lady" (Maui, July 30); "Freedom" (Isle of Wight, August 30)
- West Coast Seattle Boy: The Jimi Hendrix Anthology (2010): "Red House" (Berkeley, May 30)
- Voodoo Child (film 2010, released with West Coast Seattle Boy): portions of "Machine Gun", "Hey Baby", "Purple Haze" (Berkeley, May 30); "Foxey Lady", "In from the Storm" (Maui, July 30); "Freedom", "Voodoo Child" (Isle of Wight, August 30)
- "Hear My Train A Comin'" (film 2012): "Message to Love", "Lover Man", "Purple Haze", "Voodoo Child" (New York Pop, July 17); "Killing Floor", "Spanish Castle Magic", "All Along the Watchtower", "Foxey Lady" (Love & Peace Festival, September 6)

== Concerts ==
List of concerts with date, location, venue, support act(s)/event, references
Date (1970)	Location	Venue	Support act(s) / event	Ref(s)
April 25	Inglewood, California	The Forum	Buddy Miles Express; Ballin' Jack	
April 26	Sacramento, California	Cal Expo	Buddy Miles Express; Blue Mountain Eagle	
May 1	Milwaukee, Wisconsin	Milwaukee Auditorium	Oz	
May 2	Madison, Wisconsin	Dane County Coliseum	Savage Grace; Oz	
May 3	Saint Paul, Minnesota	St. Paul Auditorium	Savage Grace; Oz	
May 4	New York City, New York	The Village Gate	performed 3 songs at a small benefit for Timothy Leary	
May 8 (2 shows)	Norman, Oklahoma	University of Oklahoma; Field House	Bloodrock	
May 9	Fort Worth, Texas	Will Rogers Coliseum	—	
May 10	San Antonio, Texas	HemisFair Arena	—	
May 16	Philadelphia, Pennsylvania	Temple Stadium	Grateful Dead; Steve Miller Band; Cactus	
May 22	Cincinnati, Ohio	Cincinnati Gardens	cancelled	
May 23	St. Louis, Missouri	Kiel Auditorium	cancelled	
May 24	Columbus, Ohio	Veterans Memorial Auditorium	cancelled	
May 30 (2 shows)	Berkeley, California	Berkeley Community Theatre	Tower of Power	
June 5	Dallas, Texas	Memorial Auditorium	Ballin' Jack	
June 6	Houston, Texas	Sam Houston Coliseum	Ballin' Jack	
June 7	Tulsa, Oklahoma	Assembly Center Arena	Ballin' Jack	
June 9	Memphis, Tennessee	Mid-South Coliseum	—	
June 10	Evansville, Indiana	Roberts Municipal Stadium	—	
June 13	Baltimore, Maryland	Baltimore Civic Center	Cactus; Ballin' Jack	
June 19	Albuquerque, New Mexico	Albuquerque Civic Auditorium	—	
June 20	San Bernardino, California	Swing Auditorium	Ballin' Jack; Grin	
June 21	Ventura, California	Ventura County Fairgrounds	Ballin' Jack; Grin	
June 23	Denver, Colorado	Mammoth Gardens	—	
June 27	Boston, Massachusetts	Boston Garden	The Illusion; Cactus	
July 4	Byron, Georgia	Middle Georgia Raceway	Atlanta Pop Festival	
July 5 (2 shows)	Miami, Florida	Miami Jai-Alai Fronton	—	
July 17	Randall's Island, New York City	Downing Stadium	New York Pop Festival	
July 25	San Diego, California	San Diego Sports Arena	Cat Mother & the All Night Newsboys	
July 26	Seattle, Washington	Sick's Stadium	Cactus; Rube Tuben; The Rhondonnas	
July 30 (2 shows)	Maui, Hawaii	former pasture near Olinda	Rainbow Bridge Vibratory Color Sound Experiment	
Aug 1	Honolulu, Hawaii	Honolulu International Center	—	
Aug 31 (Note: At the Isle of Wight, Hendrix was originally scheduled to perform Sunday night, August 30. However, "due to a series of logistical delays", he actually performed Monday morning, August 31.)	Isle of Wight, England	East Afton Farm	Isle of Wight Festival	
Aug 31	Stockholm, Sweden	Gröna Lund	—	
Sep 1	Gothenburg, Sweden	Liseberg	—	
Sep 2 (Note: After playing three songs, Hendrix was unable to continue performing and left; concert goers received refunds.)	Aarhus, Denmark	Vejlby-Risskov Hallen	Blue Sun	
Sep 3	Copenhagen, Denmark	K.B. Hallen	Blue Sun	
Sep 4	West Berlin, West Germany	Deutschlandhalle	Super Concert '70	
Sep 6	Fehmarn, West Germany	Mecklenburg Bay	Love & Peace Festival	
"—" indicates that the information is unavailable.
