= Songs for Groovy Children: The Fillmore East Concerts =

Box set live album by Jimi Hendrix
- Released: November 22, 2019
- Recorded: December 31, 1969 – January 1, 1970
- Venues: Fillmore East, New York City
- Genres: Rock; funk rock
- Length: 324:30
- Label: Experience Hendrix/Legacy
- Producers: Janie Hendrix; Eddie Kramer; John McDermott

Jimi Hendrix chronology
Both Sides of the Sky (2018)	Songs for Groovy Children: The Fillmore East Concerts (2019)	Live in Maui (2020)

Professional ratings
Review scores
Source	Rating
All About Jazz	4.5/5 stars
AllMusic	4/5 stars
The Arts Desk	5/5 stars
Seattlepi	favorable
Uncut	4.5/5 stars

Songs For Groovy Children: The Fillmore East Concerts is a chronologically sequenced collection of American musician Jimi Hendrix's 1969–1970 New Years recorded performances at the Fillmore East in New York City. It was released as a box set of five-CDs on November 22, 2019 and an eight-LP set on December 13.

With over five hours of recorded music, the box set contains 43 songs, which Experience Hendrix (the current managers of Hendrix's recording legacy) note "assembles all four concerts from New Year’s Eve 1969 and New Year’s Day 1970". Several previously unreleased recordings are included, along with longer versions of some already issued. However, at least five songs were left off and at least one other was edited for the box set.

== Background and recording ==
Not long after his performance at the Woodstock Festival on August 18, 1969, Hendrix began rehearsing and recording with drummer Buddy Miles and bassist Billy Cox. As part of deal to settle a contract dispute, Hendrix agreed to deliver an album to Capitol Records. To meet this, four sets of performances over two nights at the Fillmore East auditorium in New York City were recorded by the trio. Sound engineer Wally Heider, who had recorded Hendrix live several times, including at the Monterey Pop Festival in 1967 and Woodstock, supervised the recording.

== Songs ==
Since Hendrix was obligated to supply an album of new material, the set lists for the Fillmore East shows contained mostly new songs. Although songs such as "Lover Man", "Hear My Train A Comin'", and "Bleeding Heart" had often been played by the Jimi Hendrix Experience, they had not been issued on record. At Woodstock, Hendrix performed early versions of "Message to Love", "Izabella", and part of "Stepping Stone", which were not released officially until the 1990s (although studio versions of the last two were released as a single in the U.S. in April 1970).

In addition to these tunes, several new Hendrix compositions were debuted and recorded: "Power of Soul", "Machine Gun", "Ezy Ryder", "Earth Blues", "Burning Desire", and "Who Knows". Miles also supplied a couple of originals: "Changes" and the jam number "We Gotta Live Together". The set lists included the Jerry Ragovoy and Mort Shuman composition "Stop" (a hit in 1968 for R&B singer Howard Tate) sung by Miles. The popular Experience numbers "Stone Free", "Foxey Lady", "Voodoo Child (Slight Return)", and "Purple Haze" were sometimes played for encores.

Experience Hendrix indicates that Songs For Groovy Children "boasts over two dozen tracks that have either never before been released commercially or have been newly pressed and newly remixed". Tracks not previously officially released in one form or another, include "Ezy Ryder", "Changes", "Message to Love", and "Stop" from the December 31 second show; and "Lover Man", "Steal Away", "Hey Joe", and "Purple Haze" from the January 1 second show. Additionally, longer versions of previously released tracks include "Who Knows" and "Stone Free" from December 31, 1969 second show; "Who Knows" and "Stop" from January 1, 1970 first show; and "Power of Soul", "Changes", "Machine Gun", (Note: The version of "Machine Gun" released on Voodoo Child: The Jimi Hendrix Collection (2001) runs 11:36.) and "We Gotta Live Together" (Note: The version of "We Gotta Live Together" released on Live at the Fillmore East (1999) runs 9:55.) from January 1, 1970 second show. However, AllMusic critic Sean Westergaard notes that "We Gotta Live Together" lasts "just under ten minutes", while the full performance lasted 18 minutes.

== Critical reception ==
In a review for AllMusic, Sean Westergaard notes the high quality sound and more comprehensive presentation of the four shows: "this is an amazing set. The band is completely locked into each other and Hendrix turns in some truly astonishing playing. Hearing all four shows gives a better idea of how improvised some of these performances were, yet how in tune the players were with each other." However, he feels that inclusion of longer versions of songs originally edited for the 1970 Band of Gypsys album "doesn't necessarily make for better listening" and that "the five complete tracks left off the second December 31 set ... should have been included."

== Set lists and releases ==
Key
†	Indicates first released on Songs for Groovy Children
#	Indicates more than one minute longer than original release

December 31, 1969 first show set list & releases
Title	First official release (year)	Length (first official release)	Length (Songs for Groovy Children)	Ref(s)
"Power of Soul"	Machine Gun: The Fillmore East First Show (2016)	5:30	5:30	
"Lover Man"	Machine Gun	3:14	3:14	
"Hear My Train A Comin'"	Band of Gypsys 2 (1986)	9:05	9:06	
"Changes"	Live at the Fillmore East (1999)	5:37	5:58	
"Izabella"	Live at the Fillmore East	3:41	3:29	
"Machine Gun"	Machine Gun	8:54	8:54	
"Stop"	Machine Gun	5:30	5:30	
"Ezy Ryder"	Machine Gun	5:55	5:55	
"Bleeding Heart"	Machine Gun	6:38	6:38	
"Earth Blues"	Machine Gun	6:24	6:24	
"Burning Desire"	Machine Gun	9:40	9:40	

December 31, 1969 second show set list & releases
Title	First official release (year)	Length (first official release)	Length (Songs for Groovy Children)	Ref(s)
"Auld Lang Syne"	Live at the Fillmore East (1999)	3:54	3:55	
"Who Knows"	Live at the Fillmore East	3:55	8:40	
"Stepping Stone"	—	—	not included	
"Burning Desire"	—	—	not included	
"Fire"	West Coast Seattle Boy (2010)	4:41	5:15	
"Ezy Ryder"	Songs for Groovy Children (2019)	—	4:24	
"Machine Gun"	Live at the Fillmore East	13:36	13:51	
"Power of Soul"	—	—	not included	
"Stone Free"	West Coast Seattle Boy	14:46	17:22	
"Changes"	Songs for Groovy Children	—	8:06	
"Message to Love"	Songs for Groovy Children	—	3:37	
"Stop"	Songs for Groovy Children	—	7:02	
"Foxey Lady"	West Coast Seattle Boy	6:29	6:45	
"Voodoo Child (Slight Return)"	—	—	not included	
"Purple Haze"	—	—	not included	

January 1, 1970 first show set list & releases
Title	First official release (year)	Length (first official release)	Length (Songs for Groovy Children)	Ref(s)
"Who Knows"	Band of Gypsys (1970)	9:34	10:52	
"Machine Gun"	Band of Gypsys	12:38	12:38	
"Changes"	Hendrix: Band of Gypsys (DVD, 1999)	(Note: The timing is not listed; the DVD performance of "Changes" runs 6:31 (music only).)	7:25	
"Power of Soul"	Live at the Fillmore East (1999)	6:19	6:15	
"Stepping Stone"	Live at the Fillmore East	5:20	5:30	
"Foxey Lady"	Band of Gypsys 2 (1986)	6:36	7:21	
"Stop"	Band of Gypsys 2	4:48	6:07	
"Earth Blues"	Hendrix: Band of Gypsys (DVD, 1999)	(Note: The timing is not listed; the DVD performance of "Earth Blues" cuts in during the guitar solo and runs 4:37 (music only).)	8:50	
"Burning Desire"	Live at the Fillmore East	8:22	8:56	

January 1, 1970 second show set list & releases
Title	First official release (year)	Length (first official release)	Length (Songs for Groovy Children)	Ref(s)
"Stone Free"	Live at the Fillmore East (1999)	12:56	13:11	
"Power of Soul"	Band of Gypsys (1970)	6:55	9:10	
"Changes"	Band of Gypsys	5:11	9:33	
"Message to Love"	Band of Gypsys	5:24	5:25	
"Machine Gun"	Live at the Fillmore East	6:02	11:52	
"Lover Man"	Songs for Groovy Children (2019)	—	2:35	
"Steal Away"	Songs for Groovy Children (2019)	—	5:53	
"Earth Blues"	Live at the Fillmore East	5:58	5:54	
"Voodoo Child (Slight Return)"	Live at the Fillmore East	6:02	5:59	
"We Gotta Live Together"	Band of Gypsys	5:51	9:48 (Note: Westergaard notes that while this release lasts "just under ten minutes", "We Gotta Live Together" runs a "full 18 minutes".)	
"Wild Thing"	Live at the Fillmore East	3:06	3:13	
"Hey Joe"	Songs for Groovy Children	–	3:56	
"Purple Haze"	Songs for Groovy Children	—	4:52	

== Track listing ==
All tracks are written by Jimi Hendrix, except where noted.

Disc one – December 31, 1969 first set
No.	Title	Lead vocals	Length
1.	"Power of Soul"	Jimi Hendrix, Buddy Miles	5:30
2.	"Lover Man"	Hendrix	3:14
3.	"Hear My Train A Comin'"	Hendrix	9:06
4.	"Changes" (Miles)	Miles	5:58
5.	"Izabella"	Hendrix	3:29
6.	"Machine Gun"	Hendrix, Miles	8:54
7.	"Stop" (Jerry Ragovoy, Mort Shuman)	Miles	5:30
8.	"Ezy Ryder"	Hendrix	5:55
9.	"Bleeding Heart" (Elmore James)	Hendrix	6:38
10.	"Earth Blues"	Hendrix	6:24
11.	"Burning Desire"	Hendrix	9:40
Total length:			70:18

Disc two – December 31, 1969 second set
No.	Title	Lead vocals	Length
1.	"Auld Lang Syne" (Robert Burns)	Instrumental	3:55
2.	"Who Knows"	Hendrix, Miles	8:40
3.	"Fire"	Hendrix	5:15
4.	"Ezy Ryder"	Hendrix	4:24
5.	"Machine Gun"	Hendrix, Miles	13:51
6.	"Stone Free"	Hendrix	17:22
7.	"Changes" (Miles)	Miles	8:06
8.	"Message to Love"	Hendrix	3:37
9.	"Stop" (Ragovoy, Shuman)	Miles	7:02
10.	"Foxey Lady"	Hendrix	6:45
Total length:			78:57

Disc three – January 1, 1970 first set
No.	Title	Lead vocals	Length
1.	"Who Knows"	Hendrix, Miles	10:52
2.	"Machine Gun"	Hendrix, Miles	12:38
3.	"Changes" (Miles)	Miles	7:25
4.	"Power of Soul"	Hendrix, Miles	6:15
5.	"Stepping Stone"	Hendrix	5:30
6.	"Foxey Lady"	Hendrix	7:21
7.	"Stop" (Ragovoy, Shuman)	Miles	6:07
8.	"Earth Blues"	Hendrix	8:50
9.	"Burning Desire"	Hendrix	8:56
Total length:			73:54

Disc four – January 1, 1970 second set
No.	Title	Lead vocals	Length
1.	"Stone Free"	Hendrix	13:11
2.	"Power of Soul"	Hendrix, Miles	9:10
3.	"Changes" (Miles)	Miles	9:33
4.	"Message to Love"	Hendrix	5:25
5.	"Machine Gun"	Hendrix, Miles	11:52
6.	"Lover Man"	Hendrix	2:35
7.	"Steal Away" (Jimmy Hughes)	Miles	5:53
8.	"Earth Blues"	Hendrix, Miles	5:54
Total length:			63:33

Disc five – January 1, 1970 second set (continued)
No.	Title	Lead vocals	Length
9.	"Voodoo Child (Slight Return)"	Hendrix	5:59
10.	"We Gotta Live Together" (Miles)	Miles, Hendrix, Billy Cox	9:48
11.	"Wild Thing" (Chip Taylor)	Hendrix	3:13
12.	"Hey Joe" (Billy Roberts)	Hendrix	3:56
13.	"Purple Haze"	Hendrix	4:52
Total length:			27:48

== Personnel ==
Musicians

- Billy Cox – bass, vocals
- Jimi Hendrix – guitar, vocals, original recordings producer (as Heaven Research)
- Buddy Miles – drums, vocals

Production personnel

- Bernie Grundman – mastering engineer
- Chandler Harrod – studio mixing engineer
- Wally Heider – live recording engineer
- Janie Hendrix – producer
- Eddie Kramer – mixing engineer, producer
- John McDermott – producer

== Charts ==
Chart (2019)	Peak position
Belgian Albums (Ultratop Flanders)	181
Belgian Albums (Ultratop Wallonia)	67
French Albums (SNEP)	174
German Albums (Offizielle Top 100)	64
Japanese Albums (Oricon)	42
Swiss Albums (Schweizer Hitparade)	96

== Bibliography ==
- Brown, Tony (1992). Jimi Hendrix: A Visual Documentary – His Life, Loves and Music. London: Omnibus Press. ISBN 978-0-7119-2761-2.
- Fricke, David (2016). Machine Gun: The Fillmore East First Show (CD notes). Jimi Hendrix. New York City: Legacy. OCLC 980707580. 8898534162.
- Loder, Kurt (2001). Voodoo Child: The Jimi Hendrix Collection (CD compilation booklet). Jimi Hendrix. Universal City, California: MCA Records. 066 112 603-2.
- McDermott, John (1997). Band of Gypsys (CD reissue booklet). Jimi Hendrix. Hollywood, California: Capitol Records. OCLC 224432346. 72434-93446-2-4.
- McDermott, John (1999). Live at the Fillmore East (CD booklet). Jimi Hendrix. Universal City, California: MCA Records. OCLC 42332285. MCAD2-11931.
- McDermott, John; Kramer, Eddie; Cox, Billy (2009). Ultimate Hendrix. New York City: Backbeat Books. ISBN 0-87930-938-5.
- McDermott, John (2010). West Coast Seattle Boy: The Jimi Hendrix Anthology (CD/DVD set booklet). Jimi Hendrix. New York City: Sony Music Entertainment. OCLC 762162961. 88697769272.
- Shadwick, Keith (2003). Jimi Hendrix: Musician. San Francisco: Backbeat Books. ISBN 0-87930-764-1.
- Shapiro, Harry; Glebbeek, Cesar (1990). Jimi Hendrix: Electric Gypsy (1st. U.S. ed.). New York City: St. Martin's Press. ISBN 0-312-05861-6.
