= Machine Gun: The Fillmore East First Show =

Live album by Jimi Hendrix
- Released: September 30, 2016
- Recorded: December 31, 1969
- Venue: Fillmore East, New York City
- Genre: Rock; funk; funk rock
- Length: 70:18
- Label: Legacy
- Producer: Janie Hendrix; Eddie Kramer; John McDermott

Jimi Hendrix chronology
Freedom: Atlanta Pop Festival (2015)	Machine Gun: The Fillmore East First Show (2016)	Both Sides of the Sky (2018)

Machine Gun: The Fillmore East First Show is a live album by Jimi Hendrix, featuring songs recorded during the first set at the Fillmore East in New York City on December 31, 1969. Hendrix is backed by Billy Cox on bass and Buddy Miles on drums, a lineup frequently referred to as the Band of Gypsys. Except for "Hear My Train A Comin'" and "Lover Man", the eleven songs represent new material that had not been performed by the Jimi Hendrix Experience.

The album further documents Hendrix's first of four sets on New Year's Eve and New Year's Day with the Band of Gypsys. It adds to the previously released material on Band of Gypsys (1970), Band of Gypsys 2 (1986), Live at the Fillmore East (1999), and West Coast Seattle Boy: The Jimi Hendrix Anthology (2010). All of the tracks, except for "Hear My Train A Comin'", "Changes" and "Izabella", appear for the first time on an official release. As of November 22, 2019, they appear on the Fillmore East performances box set Songs for Groovy Children: The Fillmore East Concerts.

== Critical reception ==
Professional ratings
Retrospective reviews
Review scores
Source	Rating
AllMusic	4/5 stars

In a review for AllMusic, Sean Westergaard singled out the performances of "Hear My Train A Comin'" (previously released), "Machine Gun", and "Bleeding Heart" as "amazing" and "stunning". Engineer Eddie Kramer receives credit for "a truly excellent mix". Westergaard concludes with:

It's not really fair to compare Machine Gun to Band of Gypsys since one is a largely unedited complete performance and the other is the best cuts selected from a couple shows. That said, there are performances here that rival those of the original Band of Gypsys album.

== Track listing ==
All tracks are written by Jimi Hendrix, except where noted.

No.	Title	Lead vocal	Length
1.	"Power of Soul"	Jimi Hendrix, Buddy Miles	5:30
2.	"Lover Man"	Hendrix	3:14
3.	"Hear My Train A Comin'"	Hendrix	9:06
4.	"Changes" (Buddy Miles)	Miles	5:58
5.	"Izabella"	Hendrix	3:29
6.	"Machine Gun"	Hendrix, Miles	8:54
7.	"Stop" (Jerry Ragovoy, Mort Shuman)	Miles	5:30
8.	"Ezy Ryder"	Hendrix	5:55
9.	"Bleeding Heart" (Elmore James)	Hendrix	6:38
10.	"Earth Blues"	Hendrix	6:24
11.	"Burning Desire"	Hendrix	9:40
Total length:			70:18

== Personnel ==
- Jimi Hendrix – vocals, guitar
- Billy Cox – bass guitar, backing vocals
- Buddy Miles – drums, vocals

== Charts ==
Chart (2016)	Peak position
Belgian Albums (Ultratop Flanders)	68
Belgian Albums (Ultratop Wallonia)	29
Dutch Albums (Album Top 100)	46
French Albums (SNEP)	85
Italian Albums (FIMI)	47
Scottish Albums (OCC)	52
Spanish Albums (PROMUSICAE)	94
UK Albums (OCC)	80
US Billboard 200	66
