= Freedom: Atlanta Pop Festival =

Live album by Jimi Hendrix
- Released: August 28, 2015
- Recorded: July 4, 1970
- Venue: Atlanta International Pop, Byron, Georgia
- Genre: Rock
- Length: 82:06
- Label: Legacy
- Producer: Janie Hendrix; Eddie Kramer; John McDermott

Jimi Hendrix chronology
| Miami Pop Festival (2013) | Freedom: Atlanta Pop Festival (2015) | Machine Gun: The Fillmore East First Show (2016) |

Freedom: Atlanta Pop Festival is a posthumous live album by Jimi Hendrix, released in 2015. It documents his July 4, 1970, performance at the Atlanta International Pop Festival. The festival's audience, subject to a wide range of estimates from 200,000-400,000, was the largest U.S. crowd to which Hendrix played during his career.

Recorded around the middle of his The Cry of Love Tour, Hendrix is backed by Billy Cox on bass and Mitch Mitchell on drums. The sixteen songs were recorded during their evening performance and include a mix of popular Jimi Hendrix Experience-era tunes, and his newer compositions, "Message to Love", "Freedom", and "Straight Ahead". However, the album does not include his closing number, "Hey Baby (New Rising Sun)"; biographer Keith Shadwick notes tuning problems with the song.

== Electric Church video and other releases ==
The album was released on August 28, 2015, and a video documentary, Jimi Hendrix: Electric Church, including Hendrix's performance premiered on the American cable television network Showtime on September 4, 2015, with a commercial DVD/Blu-Ray release on October 30.

Prior to 2015, songs and video clips of Hendrix's performance had been released several times, such as on Johnny B. Goode (1988) and disc four of Stages (1991).

== Critical reception ==
Professional ratings
Review scores
| Source | Rating |
|---|---|
| AllMusic | 4/5 stars |

In a review for AllMusic, critic Sean Westergaard gave the album four out of five stars. He notes that Hendrix falters a bit on the rarely played "All Along the Watchtower", but praises his performance of "Hear My Train A Comin'", which he calls "an absolutely incredible version ... a guitar performance nearly equal to "Machine Gun" on Band of Gypsys, [and] one of the greatest solos of his career."

== Track listing ==
All tracks are written by Jimi Hendrix, except where noted.

Disc one
| No. | Title | Length |
|---|---|---|
| 1. | "Fire" | 4:40 |
| 2. | "Lover Man" | 2:59 |
| 3. | "Spanish Castle Magic" | 5:21 |
| 4. | "Red House" | 8:27 |
| 5. | "Room Full of Mirrors" | 3:19 |
| 6. | "Hear My Train A Comin'" | 9:32 |
| 7. | "Message to Love" | 4:54 |
| Total length: | | 39:13 |

Disc two
| No. | Title | Length |
|---|---|---|
| 1. | "All Along the Watchtower" (Bob Dylan) | 4:19 |
| 2. | "Freedom" | 4:08 |
| 3. | "Foxy Lady" | 4:30 |
| 4. | "Purple Haze" | 4:19 |
| 5. | "Hey Joe" (Billy Roberts) | 4:37 |
| 6. | "Voodoo Child (Slight Return)" | 7:58 |
| 7. | "Stone Free" | 5:25 |
| 8. | "Star Spangled Banner" (Traditional) | 2:47 |
| 9. | "Straight Ahead" | 4:52 |
| Total length: | | 42:53 |

== Personnel ==
- Jimi Hendrix – guitar, vocals
- Billy Cox – bass guitar, backing vocals
- Mitch Mitchell – drums

== Charts ==
| Chart (2015) | Peak position |
|---|---|
| Belgian Albums (Ultratop Flanders) | 86 |
| Belgian Albums (Ultratop Wallonia) | 33 |
| Dutch Albums (Album Top 100) | 22 |
| French Albums (SNEP) | 89 |
| UK Albums (OCC) | 87 |
| US Billboard 200 | 63 |
