= Live at the Fillmore East (Jimi Hendrix album) =

Live album by Jimi Hendrix
- Released: February 23, 1999
- Recorded: December 31, 1969 – January 1, 1970
- Venue: Fillmore East, New York City
- Genre: Rock; funk rock
- Length: 115:02
- Label: MCA
- Producer: Janie Hendrix; Eddie Kramer; John McDermott

Jimi Hendrix chronology
BBC Sessions (1998)	Live at the Fillmore East (1999)	Live at Woodstock (1999)

Live at the Fillmore East is a posthumous live album by Jimi Hendrix released on February 23, 1999. The album documents Hendrix's performances with the Band of Gypsys at the Fillmore East on December 31, 1969, and January 1, 1970. It is drawn from the same performances as, and can be seen as an extended complement to, the album Band of Gypsys (1970), consisting mostly of songs not on the original album. The album peaked at No. 77 on the Canadian RPM Album charts.

Since its original release, additional recordings from the Fillmore East performances have been issued on West Coast Seattle Boy: The Jimi Hendrix Anthology (2010), Machine Gun: The Fillmore East First Show (2013), and Songs for Groovy Children: The Fillmore East Concerts (2019).

Professional ratings
Review scores
Source	Rating
AllMusic	4/5 stars
Pitchfork Media	(9.2/10)
Rolling Stone	4/5 stars
Tom Hull – on the Web	A−

== Track listing ==
All details are taken from the original MCA Records CD liner notes. All tracks written by Jimi Hendrix, except where noted.

Disc one
No.	Title	Date	Length
1.	"Stone Free"	1/1/70 2nd show	12:56
2.	"Power of Soul"	1/1/70 1st show	6:19
3.	"Hear My Train A Comin'"	12/31/69 1st show	9:01
4.	"Izabella"	12/31/69 1st show	3:41
5.	"Machine Gun"	1/1/70 2nd show	11:36
6.	"Voodoo Child (Slight Return)"	1/1/70 2nd show	6:02
7.	"We Gotta Live Together" (Buddy Miles)	1/1/70 2nd show	9:55

Disc two
No.	Title	Date	Length
1.	"Auld Lang Syne" (Traditional; adaptation by Hendrix)	12/31/69 2nd show	3:54
2.	"Who Knows"	12/31/69 2nd show	3:56
3.	"Changes" (Miles)	12/31/69 1st show	5:37
4.	"Machine Gun"	12/31/69 2nd show	13:36
5.	"Stepping Stone"	1/1/70 1st show	5:20
6.	"Stop" (Jerry Ragovoy, Mort Shuman)	1/1/70 1st show	5:43
7.	"Earth Blues"	1/1/70 2nd show	5:58
8.	"Burning Desire"	1/1/70 1st show	8:22
9.	"Wild Thing" (Chip Taylor)	1/1/70 2nd show	3:06

== Personnel ==
- Jimi Hendrix – guitar, lead vocals (except those by Miles)
- Buddy Miles – drums, backing vocals, lead vocals on "We Gotta Live Together", "Changes", "Stop"
- Billy Cox – bass guitar, backing vocals
