= Both Sides of the Sky =

Compilation album by Jimi Hendrix
- Released: March 9, 2018
- Recorded: January 1968 – February 1970
- Studio: Record Plant, New York City; Olympic, London
- Genre: Rock
- Length: 65:32
- Label: Legacy
- Producer: Eddie Kramer, Janie Hendrix, John McDermott

Jimi Hendrix chronology
| Machine Gun: The Fillmore East First Show (2016) | Both Sides of the Sky (2018) | Songs for Groovy Children (2019) |

Both Sides of the Sky is a compilation album by Jimi Hendrix, released by Legacy Recordings and Experience Hendrix on March 9, 2018. The 13-track album, including ten previously unreleased recordings, were recorded with either the Jimi Hendrix Experience or the Band of Gypsys lineups, and features guest appearances from Stephen Stills, Johnny Winter and Lonnie Youngblood.

The album is the third (and final) release in a trilogy of posthumously released "archival recordings" compilation albums highlighted as intended for a follow-up to Electric Ladyland (1968), starting with Valleys of Neptune (2010) and continuing with People, Hell and Angels (2013).

== Critical reception ==
In a review for AllMusic, Sean Westergaard noted that some of the material had been previously released on bootlegs, "but the truly surprising thing about this collection is the amount of material even hardcore Hendrix collectors may not have heard yet". Westergaard identifies the instrumental "Cherokee Mist", for which Hendrix plays an electric sitar, as an album highlight and concludes with "While a bit uneven in spots, Both Sides of the Sky is well worth it for an avid Hendrix fan."

== Track listing ==
All songs recorded in New York City at the Record Plant Studios, except for "Sweet Angel" recorded at Olympic Studios in London. All tracks were written by Jimi Hendrix, except where noted.

| No. | Title | Recording date(s) | Length |
|---|---|---|---|
| 1. | "Mannish Boy" (Muddy Waters) | April 22, 1969 | 5:01 |
| 2. | "Lover Man" | December 15, 1969 | 3:05 |
| 3. | "Hear My Train A Comin'" | April 9, 1969 | 7:26 |
| 4. | "Stepping Stone" | November 14, 18, 1969 | 3:12 |
| 5. | "$20 Fine" (Stephen Stills) | September 30, 1969 | 4:59 |
| 6. | "Power of Soul" | January 21, February 3, 1970 | 5:55 |
| 7. | "Jungle" | November 14, 1969 | 3:28 |
| 8. | "Things I Used to Do" (Guitar Slim) | May 7, 1969 | 3:41 |
| 9. | "Georgia Blues" | March 19, 1969 | 7:55 |
| 10. | "Sweet Angel" | January 28, 1968 | 3:54 |
| 11. | "Woodstock" (Joni Mitchell) | September 30, 1969 | 5:19 |
| 12. | "Send My Love to Linda" | January 16, 1970 | 4:36 |
| 13. | "Cherokee Mist" | May 2, 1968 | 7:01 |
| Total length: | | | 65:32 |

== Personnel ==
- Jimi Hendrix – guitar on all tracks, except 11; vocals on all tracks, except 5, 7, 9, 11, 13; bass guitar on track 10, 11; vibraphone track 10; electric sitar track 13
- Johnny Winter – guitar on track 8
- Billy Cox – bass guitar tracks 1, 2, 4–7, 12
- Buddy Miles – drums tracks 1, 2, 4–7, 11, 12
- Mitch Mitchell – drums tracks 3, 8–10, 13
- Noel Redding – bass guitar track 3
- Stephen Stills – vocals and organ on tracks 5, 11
- Lonnie Youngblood – vocals and saxophone on track 9

== Charts ==
Weekly charts
| Chart (2018) | Peak position |
|---|---|
| Australian Albums (ARIA) | 20 |
| Austrian Albums (Ö3 Austria) | 9 |
| Belgian Albums (Ultratop Flanders) | 8 |
| Belgian Albums (Ultratop Wallonia) | 19 |
| Canadian Albums (Billboard) | 13 |
| Dutch Albums (Album Top 100) | 10 |
| Finnish Albums (Suomen virallinen lista) | 16 |
| German Albums (Offizielle Top 100) | 7 |
| Hungarian Albums (MAHASZ) | 33 |
| Italian Albums (FIMI) | 59 |
| New Zealand Albums (RMNZ) | 39 |
| Norwegian Albums (VG-lista) | 25 |
| Polish Albums (ZPAV) | 47 |
| Scottish Albums (OCC) | 8 |
| Spanish Albums (PROMUSICAE) | 21 |
| Swedish Albums (Sverigetopplistan) | 15 |
| Swiss Albums (Schweizer Hitparade) | 8 |
| UK Albums (OCC) | 8 |
| US Billboard 200 | 8 |
| US Top Rock Albums (Billboard) | 3 |

Year-end charts
| Chart (2018) | Position |
|---|---|
| Belgian Albums (Ultratop Flanders) | 187 |
| US Top Rock Albums (Billboard) | 82 |
