= Band of Gypsys 2 =

Live album by Jimi Hendrix
- Released: October 1986
- Recorded: December 1969 – July 1970
- Genre: Hard rock
- Length: 40:23
- Label: Capitol
- Producer: Alan Douglas

Jimi Hendrix chronology
Johnny B. Goode (1986)	Band of Gypsys 2 (1986)	Live at Winterland (1987)

Band of Gypsys 2 is a posthumous live album by American rock musician Jimi Hendrix, released in October 1986 by Capitol Records. Produced by Alan Douglas, it followed the live mini LP Johnny B. Goode (1986), which also included live recordings from the Atlanta International Pop Festival (1970) and the Berkeley Community Theatre (1970).

The LP went out-of-print and was never released on CD, but all of the tracks (except for Ezy Ryder from the 1st show at the Berkeley Community Theatre) are included on more recent albums, such as Songs for Groovy Children: The Fillmore East Concerts (2019), Freedom: Atlanta Pop Festival (2015), and Live at Berkeley (2003).

== Critical reception ==
Professional ratings
Review scores
Source	Rating
Robert Christgau	A-
The Rolling Stone Album Guide	3.5/5 stars

In a contemporary review for The Village Voice, music critic Robert Christgau gave Band of Gypsys 2 an "A−" and said he preferred it over the original Band of Gypsys (1970) record because it lacks the "brotherhood bromides" that were on that album's second side. He added that the versions of classic Hendrix songs on this record's second side "sound a lot fresher now than they would have fifteen years ago, and not just because pressing techniques have taken such a leap". Paul Evans gave the album three-and-a-half out of five stars in The Rolling Stone Album Guide (1992).

== Track listing ==
All tracks are written by Jimi Hendrix, except where noted.

Side one
No.	Title	Recording date and location	Length
1.	"Hear My Train A Comin'"	December 31, 1969, Fillmore East (1st show)	9:05
2.	"Foxy Lady"	January 1, 1970, Fillmore East (1st show)	6:36
3.	"Stop" (Jerry Ragovoy, Mort Shuman)	January 1, 1970, Fillmore East (1st show)	4:48

Side two
No.	Title	Recording date & location	Length
1.	"Voodoo Child (Slight Return)"	July 4, 1970, Atlanta Pop Festival	7:12
2.	"Stone Free"	May 30, 1970 (2nd show), Berkeley Community Theatre	4:17
3.	"Ezy Ryder"	May 30, 1970 (1st show), Berkeley Community Theatre	8:02

Alternate rare pressing of Side two
No.	Title	Recording date & location	Length
1.	"Ezy Ryder"	May 30, 1970 (1st show), Berkeley Community Theatre	8:16
2.	"Hey Joe"	July 4, 1970, Atlanta Pop Festival	4:25
3.	"Hey Baby (New Rising Sun)"	May 30, 1970 (2nd show), Berkeley Community Theatre	6:18
4.	"Lover Man"	May 30, 1970 (2nd show), Berkeley Community Theatre	3:05

== Personnel ==
- Jimi Hendrix – guitar, vocals
- Billy Cox – bass guitar
- Buddy Miles – drums on "Hear My Train A Comin'", "Foxy Lady"; drums and vocals on "Stop"
- Mitch Mitchell – drums on "Voodoo Child (Slight Return)", "Stone Free", "Ezy Ryder", "Hey Joe", "Hey Baby (New Rising Sun)", and "Lover Man"
