= Ezy Ryder =

Song by Jimi Hendrix

from the album The Cry of Love
- B-side: "Drifting"
- Released: March 5, 1971
- Recorded: December 1969 – August 1970
- Studio: Record Plant & Electric Lady, New York City
- Genre: Hard rock; heavy metal; funk rock
- Length: 4:09
- Label: Reprise
- Songwriter: Jimi Hendrix
- Producers: Jimi Hendrix; Eddie Kramer; Mitch Mitchell

"Ezy Ryder" is a song written and recorded by American musician Jimi Hendrix. It is one of the few studio recordings to include both Buddy Miles on drums and Billy Cox on bass, with whom Hendrix recorded the live Band of Gypsys album (1970).

"Ezy Ryder" was played live in December 1969, but first released as record only on The Cry of Love, the 1971 posthumous collection of songs that Hendrix was working on when he died. Since, it has been included on other attempts to present Hendrix's planned fourth studio album, such as Voodoo Soup (1995) and First Rays of the New Rising Sun (1997). Various demo and live recordings have also been released on albums.

== Easy Rider ==
The film Easy Rider with and by Peter Fonda and Dennis Hooper was shot in the first half of 1968. While the crew was filming on the road for weeks, their dailies were already combined with various rock songs of the era. Final editing took its time, though, also for legal reasons. The Jimi Hendrix Experience were asked to contribute their 1967 song "If 6 Was 9" to the film's soundtrack, and they were shown the movie beforehand. Easy Rider debuted in May 1969 at the French Cannes Festival, was in US cinemas in mid-July, and became a popular counter-culture film, also due to its soundtrack album of the same name, that is not identical to the music within the movie. Thus, biographers indicate the lyrics to the song may have been inspired by the movie.

The three members of The Jimi Hendrix Experience also posed on Easy Rider-like chopper motorcycles, a shot of Jimi was later used as the cover of South Saturn Delta.

== Early performances ==
An early version of "Ezy Ryder" was first recorded, designated with the title "Slow", on February 16, 1969, at Olympic Studios in London. The basic track for the song was later recorded on December 18, 1969, at the Record Plant Studios in New York City. On the same day, Hendrix, with Cox and Miles, rehearsed the song at Baggy's Studios for the upcoming performances at the Fillmore East. The trio debuted "Ezy Ryder" at the Fillmore East during the first show on December 31, 1969. Later that night, the group played the song during the second show, but they did not perform it during either of the January 1, 1970, shows.

== Recording ==
Back in the studio, "Ezy Ryder" was rehearsed, recorded and mixed a number of times during early 1970. The first recording session at newly built Electric Lady Studios on June 15 was focused on advancing the studio version. Steve Winwood and Chris Wood of Traffic recorded backing vocals. Another recording session three days later was also dedicated to "Ezy Ryder", and mixes were produced on August 20 and 22. The mix of August 22 was regarded as the final mix and presented on the opening party for Electric Lady Studios on August 26.

== Critical reception ==
In a song review for AllMusic, Matthew Greenwald described "Ezy Ryder" as:

One of the few studio-recorded examples of Jimi Hendrix's Band of Gypsies period of late 1969/early 1970, "Ezy Rider" shows Hendrix moving into a stunning new direction. A tight, funk-driven rhythm is the basis for Hendrix's virtual collection of guitar riffs.

Lyrically, Greenwald sees it as building on "theme of an outlaw bent of personal freedom" as heard in Hendrix's 1966 song "Stone Free".

== Releases ==
Studio albums/compilations

- The Cry of Love (1971)
- Voodoo Soup (1995)
- First Rays of the New Rising Sun (1997)

Demos/jams/rehearsals

- The Jimi Hendrix Experience (2000) – recorded February 6, 1970
- The Baggy's Rehearsal Sessions (2002) – December 18–19, 1969
- Hear My Music (2004) – February 14, 1969
- Burning Desire (2006) – January 23, 1970

Live

- Band of Gypsys 2 (1986) – recorded May 30, 1970
- Blue Wild Angel: Live at the Isle of Wight (2002) – August 31, 1970
- Live at the Isle of Fehmarn (2005) – September 6, 1970
- Freedom: Atlanta Pop Festival (2015) – July 4, 1970
- Songs for Groovy Children: The Fillmore East Concerts (2019) – December 31, 1969 (two shows)
- Live in Maui (2020) – July 30, 1970 (second set)

== Personnel ==
Group

- Jimi Hendrix – vocals, guitars, production
- Billy Cox – bass
- Buddy Miles – drums, backing vocals

Guest musicians

- Steve Winwood – backing vocals
- Chris Wood – backing vocals
- Juma Sultan – percussion

Additional personnel

- Tony Bongiovi – engineering

== Notes ==
Citations

References

- Doggett, Peter (2011). Jimi Hendrix: The Complete Guide to His Music. London: Omnibus Press. ISBN 978-0-85712-710-5.
- Experience Hendrix (2020). "Jimi Hendrix Encyclopedia". Jimihendrix.com (official website).
- McDermott, John; Kramer, Eddie; Cox, Billy (2009). Ultimate Hendrix. Milwaukee, Wisconsin: Backbeat Books. ISBN 978-0-87930-938-1.
- Shapiro, Harry; Glebbeek, Cesar (1995). Jimi Hendrix: Electric Gypsy. New York City: St. Martin's Griffin. ISBN 0-312-13062-7.
