= Bruce Cameron (guitarist) =

- Born: 1955
- Died: October 16, 1999 (aged 44)
- Instrument: Guitar

Bruce Cameron (1955 – October 16, 1999) was an American guitarist who released an album entitled Midnight Daydream in 1999. The record is notable due to the involvement of several Jimi Hendrix alumni players; bassist Jack Bruce; and two former members of Alice Cooper, including the songwriter of most of Alice Cooper's biggest hits, Michael Bruce.

Midnight Daydream was recorded and engineered by Derrick Acker of Quetzal Recording and Bruce Cameron at his own home studio in North Carolina. The album was self-funded and self-promoted. Funds were available due to Cameron's family wealth, allowing him to bring together talent and production for his dream project. The album was released by Brain Cell Records.

A press conference concerning Midnight Daydream was held at the Hilton Hotel in Wilmington, North Carolina, on September 15, 1999. Those present included Buddy Miles, Billy Cox, Cameron, and Cameron collaborator Billy James. Publicity material touted the group of musicians as a reunion of the Hendrix band, the Band of Gypsys, on the then Cameron-run website. Within a month of the press conference, Cameron committed suicide.

== Discography ==
- Midnight Daydream, 1999
