= Hear My Train A Comin' =

- Depiction of Hendrix performing "Hear My Train A Comin'" used on album cover

Single by Jimi Hendrix

from the album Soundtrack Recordings from the Film Jimi Hendrix
- B-side: "Rock Me, Baby"
- Released: July 1973
- Recorded: December 19, 1967
- Studio: Bruce Fleming Photo Studio, London
- Genre: Blues
- Length: 3:05
- Label: Reprise
- Songwriter: Jimi Hendrix

"Hear My Train A Comin'" (alternatively titled "Get My Heart Back Together") is a blues-based song written by Jimi Hendrix. Lyrically, it was inspired by earlier American spirituals and blues songs which use a train metaphor to represent salvation. Hendrix recorded the song in live, studio, and impromptu settings several times between 1967 and 1970, but never completed it to his satisfaction.

The documentary film Experience (1968) features the only version released during Hendrix's lifetime. Hendrix played the song solo as an acoustic guitar country-style blues and it is considered one of his most memorable performances. In 1973, it was included in the film Jimi Hendrix and the accompanying soundtrack album. The song was also released as a single in the UK.

Hendrix often played "Hear My Train A Comin'" in concert using a blues rock arrangement with accompaniment. He developed it into an extended improvisational guitar piece comparable to "Voodoo Child (Slight Return)". There are several live performances in release; according to music critics, the 1970 recording from the Berkeley Community Theater is considered the definitive version. Recent Hendrix compilation albums, such as People, Hell and Angels and the Miami Pop Festival, include additional studio demo versions along with other live recordings.

== Background and lyrics ==
"Hear My Train A Comin'" is one of several blues-oriented songs that were in Hendrix's repertoire throughout his career. One of his earliest recordings with his group the Jimi Hendrix Experience was his composition "Red House", a blues song inspired by Albert King, which is included on the 1967 UK Are You Experienced debut album. In their early years, the Experience adapted and frequently performed other blues songs, including Howlin' Wolf's "Killing Floor", B.B. King's "Rock Me Baby", Elmore James' "Bleeding Heart", and "Catfish Blues", a medley of songs by Muddy Waters. They also played Muddy Waters' "Hoochie Coochie Man" in 1967 with BBC Rhythm and Blues radio show host Alexis Korner accompanying the group on slide guitar.

Hendrix biographer John McDermott calls "Hear My Train A Comin'" "a powerful blues prayer based on the salvation-train metaphor running through American folklore of every color and faith". An 1897 manuscript by Richard Spurling describes the gospel train as "built by God to carry redeemed sinners safely from this 'wilderness' ... to heaven". The late-1800s spiritual "The Gospel Train (Get on Board)" uses the lyrics "I hear the train a-comin'" and associated songs reference a train station. Hendrix researcher Harry Shapiro adds the song "delves deep into the well of blues history, recalling one of the classic motifs of the genre" and compares it to "Jim Crow Blues" and "Make My Getaway", two earlier blues songs about "escap[ing] trouble, be it political, social or personal". "Jim Crow Blues", recorded in 1929 by Cow Cow Davenport, deals with getting away from racial segregation in an American town:

I'm tired of this Jim Crow, gonna leave this Jim Crow town
Doggone my black soul, I'm sweet Chicago bound
Yes I'm leavin' here, from this ole Jim Crow town

In "Make My Getaway", recorded in 1951, Big Bill Broonzy sings of leaving Arkansas to get over a broken relationship:

Bye-bye Arkansas, tell Missouri I'm on my way up north now baby
I declare I'm gonna pack up, pack up now baby
And make my getaway

Biographer Steven Roby sees a parallel in Hendrix's early life that is reflected in the lyrics for "Hear My Train A Comin'". When he left home at 18, Hendrix departed by train for U.S. Army basic training in California. "Jimi's confusion about leaving those he cared about coexisted with his eagerness to put his nightmarish existence in Seattle behind him", writes Roby. Hendrix's earliest recorded version in 1967 includes the verses

Well I wait around the train station, waitin' for that train
Waitin' for that train to take me, from this lonesome town (have mercy)
Well now the city's put me through some changes, Lord my girl put me down

After an energetic guitar solo, Hendrix announces "Can you dig that, you see me gettin' it together, I'm tryin' to get my heart together that's all" and concludes by singing

And then I'm gonna come back to this town (yeah yeah), and buy this town
Might even give a piece to you (yes indeed baby) ...
I'm just tryin' to get my heart back together, back together again

He nearly always introduced the song as "Getting My Heart Back Together Again" or "Get My Heart Back Together", the latter of which was used for the first release of the song in 1971. In his August 1970 handwritten notes for the track listing of his proposed fourth studio album, Hendrix listed the song as "Getting My Heart Back Together". It is unknown why it was renamed "Hear My Train A Comin'" for subsequent releases, although Hendrix sometimes introduced songs in concert using alternate names. Occasionally he added a train reference to the song title, such as "Lonesome Train", "I See My Train", and "Waitin' Down at the Train Station". As Hendrix developed the song, he added to the lyrics and included "I'm gonna be a voodoo child", a reference to his 1968 composition "Voodoo Child (Slight Return)". However, he stayed with the same theme and often prefaced his performances with a short commentary, such as at one of his best-known performances in Berkeley, California, in 1970:

Here's a story that a lot of us have been through ... About a cat runnin' around town and his old lady, she don't want him around and a whole lot of people from across the tracks are puttin' him down. And nobody don't want to face up to it but the cat might have somethin', only everybody's against him because the cat might be a little different. So he goes on the road to be a Voodoo Child, come back to be a Magic Boy.

== Composition and early live releases ==
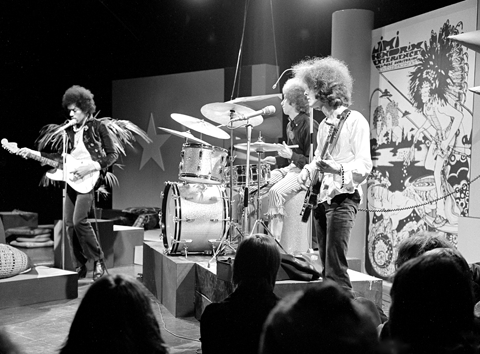
Jimi Hendrix, Mitch Mitchell, and Noel Redding performing on Dutch television, 1967

"Hear My Train A Comin'" was usually performed at a slow to andante tempo (65 to 80 beats per minute) centered on one chord with breaks. The first known recordings were made by the BBC on December 15, 1967, with Noel Redding on bass and Mitch Mitchell on drums. Redding and/or Mitchell also provide backing vocals during Hendrix's vocal. In contrast to the subdued vocal sections, the middle section features highly charged guitar soloing and accompaniment. Two takes were recorded, both lasting about five minutes. The second take was broadcast on December 24, 1967, for the Top Gear radio program. The first take recorded was released in 1988 on the Radio One album; both are included on BBC Sessions.

Around the same time, Peter Neal was making a short film documentary about the Experience, titled Experience (also known as See My Music Talking). On December 19, 1967, he captured Hendrix playing an impromptu solo version of "Hear My Train A Comin'". The filming took place during a publicity photo session at the London studio of photographer Bruce Fleming, who had photographed the British album cover for Are You Experienced. For the shoot, a twelve-string Zemaitis acoustic guitar restrung for a left-handed player was conveniently on hand. Hendrix, seated on a stool against a white backdrop, sang while playing the guitar. After a false start, he settles into the song, which biographer Keith Shadwick describes as "100 percent country blues ... s[ung] with great feeling, however artificial the circumstances of the session may have been". Hendrix's acoustic guitar playing shows familiarity with the styles of Lead Belly, Robert Johnson, and Skip James. Music writer Michael Fairchild compares some of his guitar techniques to those found in 1928 recordings by Tommy Johnson, such as "Big Fat Mama" and "Big Road Blues". The guitar was tuned down two whole steps (C–F–B♭–E♭–G–C), perhaps influenced by Lead Belly's twelve-string style. At the end of the 3:05 performance, Hendrix laughs it off with "Did you think I could do that?" In addition to the 1968 documentary, the "Hear My Train A Comin'" performance is included in the 1973 film Jimi Hendrix and accompanying soundtrack album (re-released on Blues). In the UK, it was released by Reprise Records as a single in 1973 with the Experience's adaptation of B.B. King's "Rock Me Baby" recorded at the Monterey Pop Festival in 1967 as the B-side.

In March 1968, Hendrix recorded another impromptu performance of the song with Paul Caruso on harmonica, a friend from Hendrix's Greenwich Village days. It was recorded at Hendrix's suite at the Drake Hotel in New York City, where he lived for a while during the recording of Electric Ladyland at the Record Plant. Caruso described it as "very simple, pure, like Lightnin' Hopkins' earlier work." It is included on West Coast Seattle Boy: The Jimi Hendrix Anthology released in 2010. For subsequent versions, Hendrix gradually developed "Hear My Train A Comin'" from a shorter, blues-oriented number into a longer, improvisational piece with extended guitar soloing as he had done with "Voodoo Child". The transformation is apparent in three live recordings which were released in 1971, which range from over nine to twelve minutes. Hendrix performed a nine-minute version with the Gypsy Sun and Rainbows band at the Woodstock Festival on August 19, 1969. Shadwick describes Hendrix's guitar solos as "fluently spectacular, stringing long, arching phrases together". It was released on the Woodstock soundtrack follow-up album Woodstock Two, with the title "Get My Heart Back Together" (reissued on Woodstock and Live at Woodstock). On May 30, 1970, during the Cry of Love tour, Hendrix with Mitchell and bassist Billy Cox were filmed performing the song at the Berkeley Community Theatre. Several writers consider this rendition to be definitive, including Shadwick:

He solos with a distinctive flavour, for the most part entirely melodic rather than the usual fusion of chords, melody and outright sonic manipulation. As with every great improviser he had his own distinctive melodic shapes, and a lot of them crop up here. But he makes them fresh by placing them in new contexts, either by using different registers or one of his electronic effects (here wah-wah or Uni-Vibe) to alter the timbre and texture, or by reordering them to create different continuities of phrasing.

His performance, edited down to over four minutes, appears in the film Jimi Plays Berkeley by Peter Pilafian. The complete audio recording from Berkeley with different lengths of Hendrix's introduction is included on the Rainbow Bridge album, Blues, and Voodoo Child: The Jimi Hendrix Collection. On July 30, 1970, Hendrix, Mitchell, and Cox performed outdoors in the upcountry region on the island of Maui, Hawaii. Manager Michael Jeffery had arranged for their concert as a contribution to another film, Rainbow Bridge, directed by Andy Warhol associate Chuck Wein. Due to technical problems, little of the concert footage was usable, although an edited "Hear My Train A Comin'" is included in the movie (although none of the performances from the film appear on the so-called Rainbow Bridge soundtrack album). The complete audio recording is included on several bootleg albums of the Maui concerts.

== Studio recordings ==
Hendrix recorded several studio demo versions of "Hear My Train A Comin'" and some have appeared on various compilations over the years. Producer Alan Douglas issued the first version in 1975 on the second of his controversial albums, Midnight Lightning. It was fashioned from a demo recorded by the Experience on April 7, 1969. (Note: Shapiro and Glebbeek list the original recording date for the edited Midnight Lightning version as April 2, 1969, while McDermott and Kramer list it as April 9, 1969.) Douglas erased Redding's bass part and overdubbed new bass, guitar, and percussion parts by musicians who had never recorded with Hendrix. Shadwick describes it as "painfully out of tune" and its release as "unfortunate"; it has not been reissued until 2010 on Valleys of Neptune.

At a February 17, 1969, rehearsal at the Olympic Studios before their upcoming London concerts, multiple takes of "Hear My Train A Comin'" were recorded by the Experience. The first take was later included on the 2000 The Jimi Hendrix Experience box set (re-released on Martin Scorsese Presents the Blues: Jimi Hendrix). During their following appearances at the Royal Albert Hall on February 18 and 24 (which turned out to be their last UK shows), the Experience were filmed and recorded performing the song. These have not been officially released because of contract disputes, but are frequently bootlegged. Two additional demos were recorded at the Record Plant in New York City in 1969. One, recorded on April 7 by the Experience, is included on 2010s Valleys of Neptune. On May 21, a second demo was recorded during Hendrix's first recording session with Billy Cox on bass and Buddy Miles on drums, who later performed on the live Band of Gypsys album. A solo version from 1969 where the end of the second take was tagged onto the third take was mixed by Eddie Kramer and was issued on People, Hell and Angels in 2013. The April 9, 1969, Experience recording was ultimately released in 2018 on Both Sides of the Sky.

== Additional live recordings ==
Previously unreleased recordings of "Hear My Train A Comin'" continue to be issued along with re-releases. Several amateur concert recordings are also free to stream from the Experience Hendrix official website.

- 5/18/68 Miami Pop Festival, Hallandale, Florida (7:58) – Miami Pop Festival (released 2013)
- 10/10/68 Winterland Ballroom second show, San Francisco (11:33) – The Jimi Hendrix Concerts (released 1982, re-released 2011 Winterland)
- 4/27/69 Oakland Coliseum, Oakland, California (10:25) – Live at the Oakland Coliseum (released 1998)
- 7/7/69 The Dick Cavett Show, New York City (2:29) – Jimi Hendrix: The Dick Cavett Show (Hendrix is backed by the show's Bob Rosengarden Orchestra, DVD released 2002)
- 12/31/69 Fillmore East first show, New York City (9:01) – Band of Gypsys 2 (an early contender for the original Band of Gypsys album, released 1986, re-released 1999 Live at the Fillmore East and 2016 Machine Gun: The Fillmore East First Show)
- 7/4/70 Atlanta International Pop Festival, Byron, Georgia (5:25) – Stages (released 1991)

== Covers ==
English folk musician Benji Kirkpatrick recorded an acoustic version on his 2015 album Hendrix Songs.

== Notes ==
Footnotes

Citations

References

- Belmo; Loveless, Steve (1998). Jimi Hendrix: Experience the Music. Burlington, Ontario, Canada: Collector's Guide Publishing. ISBN 1-896522-45-9.
- Fairchild, Michael (1991). Stages: Atlanta 1970 (Box set notes). Jimi Hendrix. Burbank, California: Reprise Records. 9 26732-2.
- Fairchild, Michael J. (1994). Jimi Hendrix: Blues (CD booklet). Jimi Hendrix. Universal City, California: MCA Records. MCAD-11060.
- Hendrix, Janie (2003). Jimi Hendrix: The Lyrics. Milwaukee, Wisconsin: Hal Leonard. ISBN 0-634-04930-5.
- Jacobsen, Douglas (2003). Thinking in the Spirit: Theologies of the Early Pentecostal Movement. Bloomington, Indiana: Indiana University Press. ISBN 978-0253110886.
- Loder, Kurt (2001). Voodoo Child: The Jimi Hendrix Collection (CD compilation booklet). Jimi Hendrix. Universal City, California: MCA Records. 066 112 603-2.
- McDermott, John; Kramer, Eddie (1992). Hendrix: Setting the Record Straight. New York City: Warner Books. ISBN 0-446-39431-9.
- McDermott, John; Cox, Billy; Kramer, Eddie (1995). Jimi Hendrix: Sessions (1st. ed.). Boston, Massachusetts: Little, Brown. ISBN 0-316-55549-5.
- McDermott, John (1998). Live at the Oakland Coliseum (CD notes). Jimi Hendrix Experience. Dagger Records. 08802-11743.
- McDermott, John (1999). Live at Woodstock (CD booklet). Jimi Hendrix. Universal City, California: MCA Records. MCAD2-11987.
- McDermott, John (2000). The Jimi Hendrix Experience (Box set booklet). Jimi Hendrix Experience. Universal City, California: MCA Records. 08811 23162.
- McDermott, John; Kramer, Eddie; Cox, Billy (2009). Ultimate Hendrix. New York City: Backbeat Books. ISBN 978-0-87930-938-1.
- McDermott, John (2010a). Valleys of Neptune (CD booklet). Jimi Hendrix. New York City: Legacy. 88697640562.
- McDermott, John (2010b). West Coast Seattle Boy: The Jimi Hendrix Anthology (CD set booklet). Jimi Hendrix. New York City: Legacy. 88697769272.
- McDermott, John (2013). People, Hell and Angels (CD booklet). Jimi Hendrix. New York City: Legacy. 88765418982.
- McDermott, John (2018). Both Sides of the Sky (CD booklet). Jimi Hendrix. New York City: Legacy. 19075814192.
- Murray, Charles Shaar (1991). Crosstown Traffic. New York City: St. Martin's Press. ISBN 0-312-06324-5.
- Roby, Steven (2002). Black Gold: The Lost Archives of Jimi Hendrix. New York City: Billboard Books. ISBN 0-8230-7854-X.
- Roby, Steven; Schreiber, Brad (2010). Becoming Jimi Hendrix. Boston, Massachusetts: Da Capo Press. ISBN 978-0-306-81910-0.
- Shadwick, Keith (2003). Jimi Hendrix: Musician. San Francisco, California: Backbeat Books. ISBN 0-87930-764-1.
- Shapiro, Harry; Glebbeek, Cesar (1990). Jimi Hendrix: Electric Gypsy. New York City: St. Martin's Press. ISBN 0-312-05861-6.
- Sinclair, David (1998). BBC Sessions (CD booklet). Jimi Hendrix Experience. Universal City, California: MCA Records. MCAD2-11742.
