= Stepping Stone (Jimi Hendrix song) =

Single by Jimi Hendrix

Single by Hendrix Band of Gypsys
- B-side: "Izabella"
- Released: April 8, 1970
- Recorded: January–February 1970
- Studio: Record Plant, New York City
- Genre: Funk rock
- Length: 4:05
- Label: Reprise
- Songwriter: Jimi Hendrix
- Producer: Jimi Hendrix

Hendrix U.S. singles chronology
"Stone Free" (1969)	"Stepping Stone" (1970)	"Freedom" (1971)

"Stepping Stone" is a song by American musician Jimi Hendrix. Written and produced by Hendrix, he recorded it early in 1970 with the short-lived Band of Gypsys lineup of Hendrix, Billy Cox and Buddy Miles. The song, with "Izabella", was released as a single by Reprise Records on April 8, 1970. It was the last single released by Hendrix before his death. Other versions are included on posthumous albums.

== History ==
"Stepping Stone" first appeared, in part, when Jimi Hendrix performed at Woodstock on August 18, 1969, with an interim band, sometimes referred to as Gypsy, Sun and Rainbows. Hendrix incorporated the song's rhythm into the long rendition of "Voodoo Child (Slight Return)". The band attempted to record the song (which was then known as "Sky Blues Today") in the studio on August 30. On November 14, Hendrix and Miles recorded several takes; one is included on the 2018 compilation Both Sides of the Sky.

"Stepping Stone" was first played live with Cox and Miles during the second show at the Fillmore East on December 31, 1969, and again during the first show of January 1, 1970. These were the only live performances of the song. Into 1970 the band continued work on the song at Record Plant, recording three takes with the name "I'm a Man" on January 7, the third of which provided the basic track with which they would work. They revisited the take on January 20, adding guitar overdubs and renaming it "Sky Blues Today", and another mix was prepared on January 22. More mixing was completed on February 12, and on February 15 the master take, which was later renamed "Stepping Stone" was recorded and subsequently prepared for release with "Izabella". The single, appearing with the name "Hendrix Band of Gypsys" was released on April 8, 1970, by Reprise Records. It is included on the compilations Kiss the Sky (1984) and Voodoo Child: The Jimi Hendrix Collection (2001). Record World said that the "fantastic blues-rocker is a stone gas."

After the single release "Stepping Stone", Hendrix added to the song. On June 26, 1970, he and Mitch Mitchell, who had rejoined the band, recorded new guitar and drum parts respectively. With these changes, the song was later released on War Heroes in 1972 and First Rays of the New Rising Sun in 1997. With drum overdubs by Bruce Gary in January 1995, it was included on Voodoo Soup.

== Personnel ==
Musicians

- Jimi Hendrix – vocals, guitars, production (as Heaven Research Unlimited)
- Billy Cox – bass guitar
- Buddy Miles – drums on Band of Gypsys version
- Mitch Mitchell – drums on War Heroes and First Rays of the New Rising Sun version
- Bruce Gary – drum overdubs on Voodoo Soup version

Additional personnel

- Bob Hughes – engineering
