= Voodoo Child (Slight Return) =

Song written by Jimi Hendrix

- UK single picture sleeve

Single by the Jimi Hendrix Experience

from the album Electric Ladyland
- B-side: "Hey Joe"; "All Along the Watchtower"
- Released: October 16, 1968 (US album); October 25, 1968 (UK album); October 23, 1970 (UK single)
- Recorded: May 3, 1968
- Studio: Record Plant, New York City
- Genre: Psychedelic rock; blues rock; hard rock; funk rock; proto-metal
- Length: 5:08
- Label: Reprise (US album); Track (UK album & single)
- Songwriter: Jimi Hendrix
- Producer: Chas Chandler

Hendrix UK singles chronology
"Let Me Light Your Fire" (1969)	"Voodoo Child (Slight Return)" (1970)	"Angel" (1971)

"Voodoo Child (Slight Return)" is a song written by Jimi Hendrix and recorded by the Jimi Hendrix Experience in 1968 that appears as the final track on the group's third studio album, Electric Ladyland, released that year. It contains improvised guitar and a vocal from Hendrix, backed by Noel Redding on bass and Mitch Mitchell on drums. The song is one of Hendrix's best known; it was a feature of his concert performances throughout his career, and several live renditions were recorded and released on later albums.

After his death in 1970, Track Records released the song as a single in the United Kingdom using the title "Voodoo Chile" (see confusion over title). It became Hendrix's only number one single on the UK Singles Chart, reaching the top position during the week of November 15, 1970. Several artists have performed or recorded versions of the song. Rolling Stone magazine included it at number 101 on their original 2004 list of the "500 Greatest Songs of All Time".

== Origins and recording ==
"Voodoo Child (Slight Return)" was developed from "Voodoo Chile", which had been recorded May 2, 1968, during a studio jam with Steve Winwood on organ and Jack Casady on bass. The next day, Hendrix returned to the studio with Redding and Mitchell for the filming of a short documentary by ABC television. Noel Redding explained, "We learned that song in the studio ... They had the cameras rolling on us as we played it". Hendrix added,

[S]omeone was filming when we started doing [Voodoo Child]. We did that about three times because they wanted to film us in the studio, to make us—'Make it look like you're recording, boys'—one of them scenes, you know, so, 'OK, let's play this in E, a-one, a-two, a-three', and then we went into 'Voodoo Child'.

According to Hendrix biographer Steven Roby, eight takes of the song were recorded by Hendrix, Redding, and Mitchell, and the final one was chosen as the master, which appeared on Electric Ladyland.

== Lyrics and interpretation ==
Author Charles Shaar Murray examines Hendrix's use of the term "Voodoo Child" in his book Crosstown Traffic:

Voodoo symbolism and reference resound through the country blues, and through the urbanized electric country blues of the Chicago school ... In Hendrix's case, this is pure metaphor. He certainly was not a Voodoo initiate in any formal sense ... Both with 'Voodoo Chile'—and, most specifically, with the West African even-before-Bo-Diddley beat he percussively scratches from his guitar and wah-wah pedal at the beginning of 'Voodoo Chile (Slight Return)' [sic]—he is announcing as explicitly as possible that he is a man of the blues, and one who honours, respects and understands its deepest and most profound traditions".

Except for the chorus, the lyrics of "Voodoo Child (Slight Return)" are different from "Voodoo Chile":

Well I stand up next to a mountain, and I chop it down with the edge of my hand (2×)
Well I pick up all the pieces and make an island, might even raise just a little sand
'Cause I'm a voodoo child, Lord knows I'm a voodoo child

During a January 1, 1970, performance with the Band of Gypsys, Hendrix introduced the song as the "Black Panthers' national anthem" (included on the album Live at the Fillmore East). At the time, he was being pressured to make a statement about racial issues in the U.S.

== Live recordings ==
"Voodoo Child (Slight Return)" became a staple of Hendrix's concert performances, varying in length from seven to 18 minutes. Recordings from the Winterland Ballroom, Royal Albert Hall, Woodstock, and the Fillmore East were later released on The Jimi Hendrix Concerts, Hendrix in the West, Woodstock, and Live at the Fillmore East. Many more recordings have also been issued (see List of songs recorded by Jimi Hendrix § Voodoo Child (Slight Return), the last performance of Voodoo Child (Slight Return) was at the Open Air Peace and Love Festival in Fehmarn, Germany on September 6th 1970, roughly a week before his death.

== Critical reception and recognition ==
"Voodoo Child (Slight Return)"
Intro with wah-wah and main guitar figure

An AllMusic reviewer described the song as "a perfect example of how Hendrix took the Delta blues form and not only psychedelicized it, but cast an even more powerful spell by delivering the lyric in the voice of a voodoo priest". Also noted is Hendrix's guitar work: "Opening with a simple riff on the wah-wah pedal, the song explodes into full sonic force, the guitarist hitting the crunching chords and taking the astral-inspired leads for which he became infamous. The real guitar explorations happen midway through the song, while the basic, thundering riff is unrelenting".

Joe Satriani said of the song: "It's just the greatest piece of electric guitar work ever recorded. In fact, the whole song could be considered the holy grail of guitar expression and technique. It is a beacon of humanity." Rolling Stone magazine included the song at number 102 on their list of the 500 Greatest Songs of All Time. Many musicians have covered "Voodoo Child (Slight Return)" both on record and in live performances, sometimes with the title changed to "Voodoo Chile (Slight Return)" or shortened to "Voodoo Child".

== Charts ==
Chart (1970–1971)	Peak position
Ireland (IRMA)	10
Netherlands (Single Top 100)	4
UK Singles (Official Charts)	1
West Germany (GfK)	24

== Certifications ==
Region	Certification	Certified units/sales
United Kingdom (BPI)	Gold	400,000^{‡}
^{‡} Sales+streaming figures based on certification alone.

== Stevie Ray Vaughan rendition ==
Stevie Ray Vaughan recorded "Voodoo Child (Slight Return)" for his second album, Couldn't Stand the Weather (1984), and commented in a 1985 interview: "I love Hendrix's music ... and I just feel it's important for people to hear him." Guitar World's Damian Fanelli adds "His [Vaughan's] uncanny ability to smooth out some of Hendrix's weirder edges without losing any of the music's power or excitement allowed him to credibly deliver Jimi's avant-garde blues to a whole new generation of guitar fanatics." Vaughan often performed the song in concert and live versions are included on the albums Live Alive (1986) and Live at Montreux 1982 & 1985 (2001).

== Uses in popular culture ==
Wrestler Hulk Hogan used a portion of the song as his theme music during his time as leader of the heel faction group, the new World order (nWo) while wrestling in WCW, and then during his comeback run in WWE (previously the World Wrestling Federation). According to a 2020 interview with wrestling impresario Eric Bischoff, he acquired a license for Hogan to use the song from Hendrix's stepsister and manager of his recording legacy, Janie Hendrix. Bischoff claimed that the agreement allowed him to use up to three minutes of the song in various contexts in 1997 for $100,000: "People thought I was insane, [they] thought I was burning Ted Turner's money [in 1997, but] if someone were to try to cut that deal right now [in 2020] it'd be in the millions". The song was also featured in the 1987 film Withnail & I and the 2001 film Black Hawk Down.

== See also ==
- List of UK Singles Chart number ones of the 1970s
