= Billy Cox =

American bassist (born 1941)

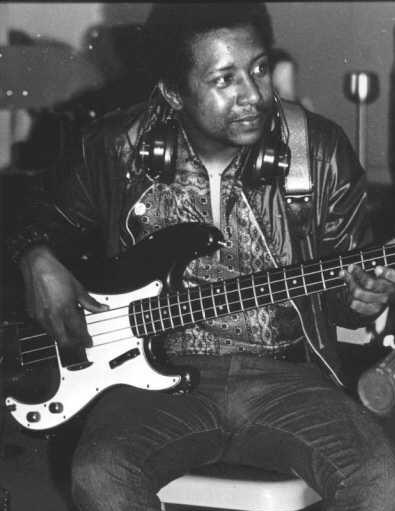
- Cox playing a Fender Precision Bass c. late 1960s

Background information
- Born: October 16, 1939 (age 87); Wheeling, West Virginia, U.S.
- Genres: R&B; rock
- Occupation: Musician
- Instruments: Bass guitar; vocals
- Years active: 1961–present
- Labels: Reprise; Legacy; Capitol; MCA; Sony; Dagger; Pye; Polydor
- Website: bassistbillycox.com

William Cox (born October 16, 1939) is an American bassist, best known for performing with Jimi Hendrix. Cox is the only living musician to have regularly played with Hendrix: first when both were in the Army, then in 1969 with the interim group that backed Hendrix at Woodstock (informally referred to as "Gypsy Sun and Rainbows"), followed by the trio with drummer Buddy Miles that recorded the live Band of Gypsys album, and, lastly, The Cry of Love Tour trio with Mitch Mitchell back on drums. Cox continues to perform dates with the Band of Gypsys Experience and the Experience Hendrix Tour.

In addition to Hendrix, he has either been a member of the house or touring band or recorded sessions for Sam Cooke, Slim Harpo, Joe Simon, Charlie Daniels, John McLaughlin, Rufus Thomas, Carla Thomas, Lou Rawls, Etta James, Jackie Wilson and Little Richard.

== Early years ==
Born in Wheeling, West Virginia, Billy Cox was raised in Pittsburgh, Pennsylvania, and attended Schenley High School.

Cox met Jimi Hendrix when they were serving in the Army at Fort Campbell, Kentucky, in 1961. While using the bathroom at Service Club No. 1 during a sudden rainstorm, he heard guitar playing inside. Impressed with what he heard, he introduced himself, told Hendrix he played bass, and they were jamming soon after. They became, and remained, fast friends. They left the military around the same time and they played clubs around Clarksville, Tennessee, finally moving to Nashville. They formed a group called the King Kasuals, and played at several Nashville clubs, mostly the Del Morocco. Occasionally the band would play outlying gigs in the southeast, once as far north as Indianapolis playing what was called the "Chitlin' Circuit". Cox and Hendrix also played in the backing band for Marion James around this time.

Hendrix eventually left Nashville, playing all over the U.S. in the backing groups of several famous artists (most notably Little Richard and the Isley Brothers) until he was "discovered" by Chas Chandler in New York City's Greenwich Village. Chandler took Hendrix to England, but before Hendrix left, he called Cox and asked him to join him. As Cox "only had three strings on [his] bass" and no money to travel to New York, he simply thanked Hendrix and wished him well.

During this period, Cox played bass on such pioneering R&B television shows as Nashville's "Night Train" and "The!!!! Beat" from Dallas, Texas, working closely with Hoss Allen and John Richbourg of WLAC Radio.

== With Jimi Hendrix ==
In 1969, several months before bassist Noel Redding left the Jimi Hendrix Experience, Hendrix called his old friend Cox, who joined him in New York as his studio bassist. Following the break-up of the Experience, Cox performed with Hendrix's interim group, informally called Gypsy Sun and Rainbows. This group played at Woodstock and two low-key New York gigs. Hendrix then formed another short-lived group with Cox and Buddy Miles, that recorded Band of Gypsys, the live album that he owed former manager Ed Chalpin as part of a legal settlement. Following their demise, Cox recorded and toured with Hendrix and Mitch Mitchell for The Cry of Love Tour, when promoters sometimes billed them as the "Jimi Hendrix Experience".

Cox contributed most of the bass parts on the first group of posthumously released Hendrix albums, including The Cry of Love (1971), Rainbow Bridge (1971), War Heroes (1972), and Loose Ends (1974). Most of the tracks from these albums were consolidated as First Rays of the New Rising Sun (1997), which is the most complete attempt to present Hendrix's fourth studio album (see Hendrix's posthumous discography and videography for a complete list). Additionally, Cox appears on many live albums and films from the Cry of Love Tour.

== After Hendrix's death ==
=== 1970s–1980s ===
In 1971, Cox released his album Nitro Function with Char Vinnedge (from Luv'd Ones) and Robert Tarrant. Cox played with others, including the Charlie Daniels Band, as well as session work and live dates. Throughout the 1970s and 1980s, Cox would continue to be a part of Jimi's music as posthumous releases continued to pour out.

=== 1990s ===
In 1993, Cox, Buddy Miles, and a relative of Jimi Hendrix, Riki Hendrix appeared on stage to play at a tribute event for Jimi Hendrix.

In 1995, Cox along with Mitchell, Redding and Miles began participating in Hendrix tributes and tours. In 1999, Cox appeared on the late Bruce Cameron's album, Midnight Daydream, that included other Hendrix alumni Mitchell and Miles along with Jack Bruce and others. Cox has also performed some dates along with Mitchell and guitarist Gary Serkin with a Hendrix-tribute outfit called the Gypsy Sun Experience.

Cox worked on First Rays of the New Rising Sun, Hendrix's fourth studio album, which was cut off by Hendrix's death. Cox has also been known to guest speak at University level music seminars. In this capacity, he spends time with aspiring musicians in discussion and demonstration sessions at Electric Lady Studios.

=== 2000s ===
In 2004, Miles reunited yet again with Cox of the Band of Gypsys to re-record songs from the original live album of 1970 with guitarists Eric Gales, Kenny Olsen, Sheldon Reynolds, Andy Aledort and Gary Serkin. The album, titled The Band of Gypsys Return, was released in 2006.

Cox currently plays with the Experience Hendrix, a semi-regular touring Hendrix tribute band featuring top guitarists and former Hendrix collaborators. Cox's solo album Last Gypsy Standing was released in 2009.

In 2009, he was inducted into the Musicians Hall of Fame and Museum in Nashville.

=== 2010s ===
Today, Billy Cox owns a video production company. He has produced numerous blues and a myriad of gospel shows. He co-authored the books Jimi Hendrix Sessions and Ultimate Hendrix with John McDermott and Eddie Kramer. Cox has been the recipient of numerous awards and honors, including these: In 2009 he was inducted into The Musicians Hall of Fame; he received the Founders Award in 2010, given by Microsoft co-founder Paul Allen. In 2011, Cox was inducted into the West Virginia Music Hall Of Fame. He released Old School Blue Blues in 2011, and continues to tour with "The Experience Hendrix Tour" each year and his own Band of Gypsys Experience. He released the single "Run" featuring the androgynous singer and songwriter Marlon Alarm in November 2011, and his latest release, Unfiltered, came out in late 2014. On June 23, 2019, Cox was inducted into the Rhythm and Blues Music Hall of Fame along with his bandmates, Hendrix and Miles for their groundbreaking work as the Band of Gypsys. Cox was on hand to accept the award in Detroit, Michigan, and performed with guitarist Dani Robinson and drummer Richie Monica.

== Discography ==
=== Solo ===
- Nitro Function (1971)
- Last Gypsy Standing (2009)
- Old School Blue Blues (2011)
- Unfiltered (2014)

=== Collaboration ===
- Them Changes, Buddy Miles (1970)
- Charlie Daniels, Charlie Daniels (1971)
- 5, J.J. Cale (1979)
- Veranda, Christine Lakeland (1984)
- "I Don't Live Today" on Stone Free: A Tribute to Jimi Hendrix, Slash, Paul Rodgers and Buddy Miles (1993)
- Midnight Daydream, Bruce Cameron (1997)
- The Deep End, Volume 2, Gov't Mule (2002)
- The Band of Gypsys Return, with Buddy Miles (2006)
- "Achilles Barbecue" on Odd, Kaoll (2014)

=== With Jimi Hendrix ===
==== Studio recordings ====
- The Cry of Love (1971)
- Rainbow Bridge (1971)
- War Heroes (1972)
- Loose Ends (1974)
- Blues (1994; 6 tracks)
- Voodoo Soup (1995)
- First Rays of the New Rising Sun (1997)
- South Saturn Delta (1997; 5 tracks)
- Valleys of Neptune (2010; 3 tracks)
- West Coast Seattle Boy (2010; 14 tracks)
- People, Hell & Angels (2013; 7 tracks)
- Both Sides of the Sky (2018; 6 tracks)

==== Live recordings ====
August 18, 1969 Woodstock performance ("Gypsy Sun and Rainbows")

- Woodstock (1994)
- Live at Woodstock (1999)

December 31, 1969 – January 1, 1970 Fillmore East performances ("Band of Gypsys")

- Band of Gypsys (1970)
- Band of Gypsys 2 (1986; side one, 3 tracks)
- Live at the Fillmore East (1999)
- Machine Gun: The Fillmore East First Show (2016)
- Songs for Groovy Children: The Fillmore East Concerts (2019)

April–September 1970 U.S./European tour ("The Cry of Love Tour")

- Isle of Wight (1971)
- The Jimi Hendrix Concerts (1982; 2 tracks)
- Johnny B. Goode (1986)
- Band of Gypsys 2 (1986; side two, 3 tracks)
- Live Isle of Wight '70 (1991)
- Blue Wild Angel: Live at the Isle of Wight (2002)
- Live at Berkeley (2003)
- Live at the Isle of Fehmarn (2005)
- Freedom: Atlanta Pop Festival (2015)

==== Anthologies ====
- Recordings with Cox are spread across several Hendrix anthologies (for further information, see Jimi Hendrix posthumous discography). He also appears in several Hendrix performance videos (see Jimi Hendrix videography).
