= Mitch Mitchell =

English drummer (1946–2008)

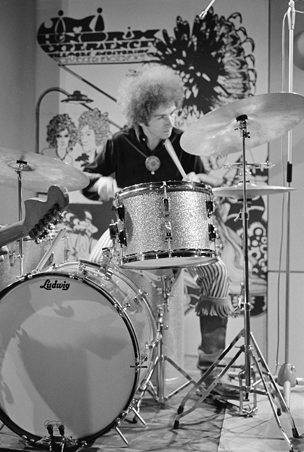
- Mitchell in 1967

Background information
- Born: John Graham Mitchell; 9 July 1946; Ealing, Middlesex, England
- Died: 12 November 2008 (aged 62) Portland, Oregon, U.S.
- Genres: Rock; jazz fusion
- Occupation: Musician
- Instrument: Drums
- Years active: 1960–2008
- Formerly of: Georgie Fame and the Blue Flames; The Jimi Hendrix Experience; The Dirty Mac; Ramatam; The Riot Squad

John Graham "Mitch" Mitchell (9 July 1946 – 12 November 2008) was an English rock and jazz drummer, best known for his contributions in the Jimi Hendrix Experience, for which he was inducted into the Rock and Roll Hall of Fame in 1992. He was inducted into the Modern Drummer Hall of Fame in 2009. In 2016, Mitchell was ranked number 8 in Rolling Stone magazine's list of the "100 Greatest Drummers of All Time".

== Biography ==
=== Early days ===
Mitchell was born in Ealing, Middlesex, to Phyliss C. (née Preston) and Thomas J. Mitchell on 9 July 1946 (although several modern sources have incorrectly claimed that he was born in 1947). As a 13 year old, he had a leading role in the British film Bottoms Up (1960) with Jimmy Edwards. As a teenager he starred in a children's television programme, Jennings at School and also had a bit part in the 1963 film Live It Up! which starred Heinz Burt, David Hemmings and Steve Marriott.

Mitchell became a musician through working at Jim Marshall's drum shop on Saturdays while still at school. Among drummers, his chief influences were Elvin Jones, Tony Williams, Max Roach, Philly Joe Jones, and Joe Morello. One of his first bands was the Soul Messengers, formed at the Ealing Club with saxophonist Terry Marshall, son of Jim Marshall.

Early in his career, he gained considerable musical experience as a touring and session musician, working with Pete Nelson and the Travellers, Frankie Reid and the Casuals (1962), Johnny Harris and the Shades, the Pretty Things, Bill Knight & the Sceptres, the Riot Squad, and the Who as a session drummer while the band was in the process of replacing Doug Sandom with Keith Moon. In 1965, he also temporarily replaced Viv Prince as drummer in the Pretty Things.

=== Georgie Fame and the Blue Flames ===
From December 1965 until October 1966, Mitchell was the drummer of Georgie Fame and the Blue Flames, appearing on their 1966 album Sweet Things. In a 2015 interview, Fame recalled: "His main hero was jazz drummer Ronnie Stephenson and if you look at early film clips of Mitch, he had that Ronnie Stephenson look, the way he set his jaw. And he loved crashing around on the cymbals like Ronnie, but in my band I liked the arrangements pretty tight. When he started splashing around I'd say 'just play the hi-hat!'".

=== The Jimi Hendrix Experience ===
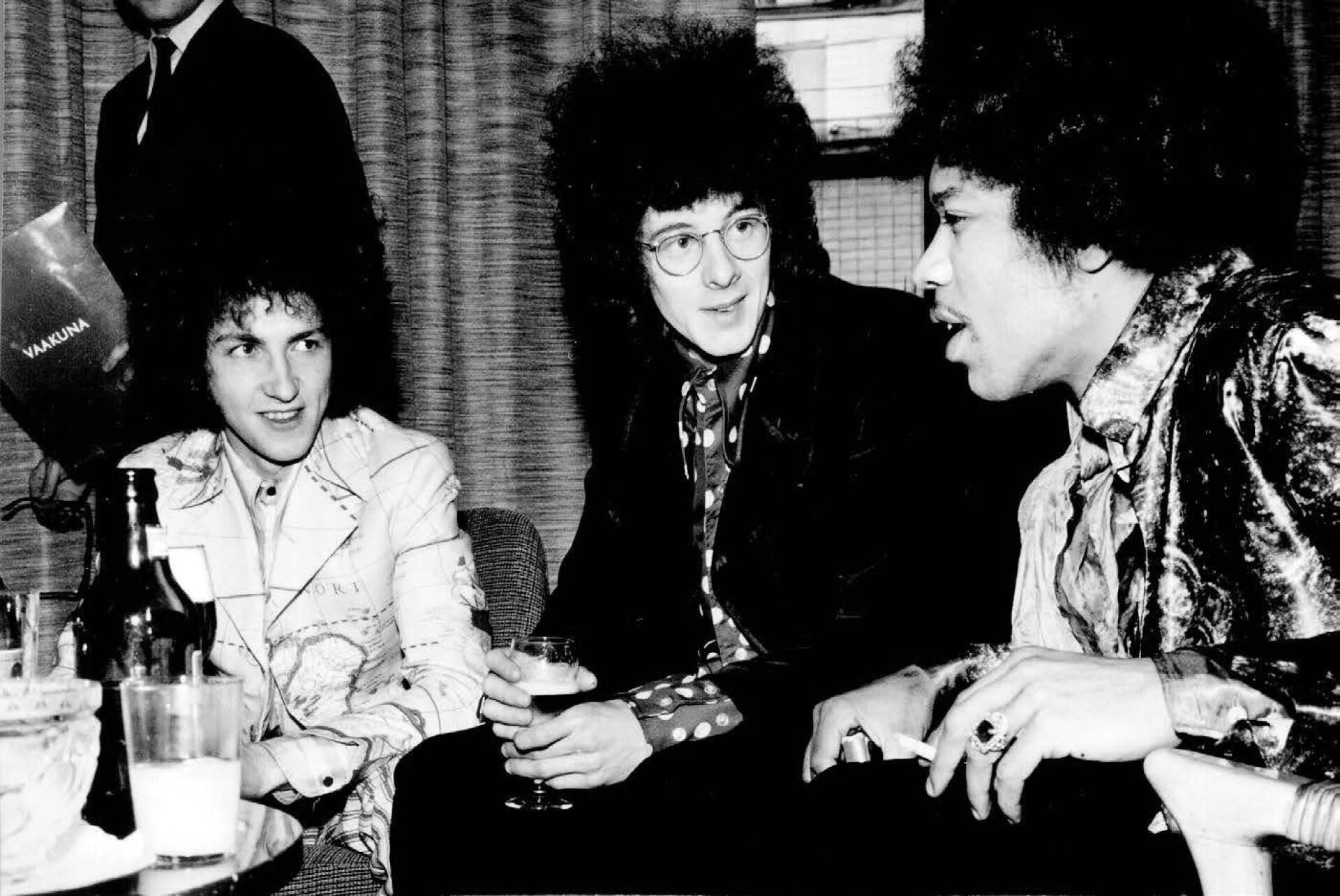
Mitchell (left) beside bandmates Redding and Hendrix in 1967

Mitchell auditioned for the Jimi Hendrix Experience on 6 October 1966 and was chosen over Aynsley Dunbar in a coin toss. Mitchell's fast, driving, jazz-influenced playing meshed well with Hendrix's open-ended, revolutionary approach to the electric guitar. He played on the three best-selling Experience studio albums, Are You Experienced (1967), Axis: Bold as Love (1968), and Electric Ladyland (1968).

Mitchell remained with Hendrix after the Experience broke up when Noel Redding quit in June 1969. He performed with Hendrix's expanded lineup at Woodstock (August 1969). Mitchell was replaced briefly with Buddy Miles for the Band of Gypsys album (1970), but rejoined Hendrix (with Billy Cox on bass) for the April–September 1970 the Cry of Love Tour. He played drums for most of the songs included on the posthumously released Hendrix studio albums The Cry of Love (1971) (also listed as a co-producer), Rainbow Bridge (1971), and War Heroes (1972).

=== Drum sets ===
Mitchell debuted with the Hendrix Experience playing a Premier drum kit in England and Europe in 1967. When the Experience came to the US for the Monterey Pop Music Festival in June 1967 Mitchell was playing that same set. Later in the summer, Mitchell switched to a Ludwig drum set and stayed with Ludwig through the rest of the year, 1967, and continued with Ludwig in 1968 and 1969. In 1970, Mitchell switched to a double-bass Gretsch Drums set, his last year with the Hendrix Experience. With the exception of the 1969 Woodstock Music Festival, during which he played a Rogers Powertone snare drum, during his time with the JHE, Mitchell played a Ludwig Supraphonic 400, a 5- by 14-inch metal snare drum. Much later, and until his death in 2008, he played DW drums.

On 11 April 1969, Mitchell played with Jimi Hendrix in Dorton Arena, in Raleigh, North Carolina, using George Hayman Drums.

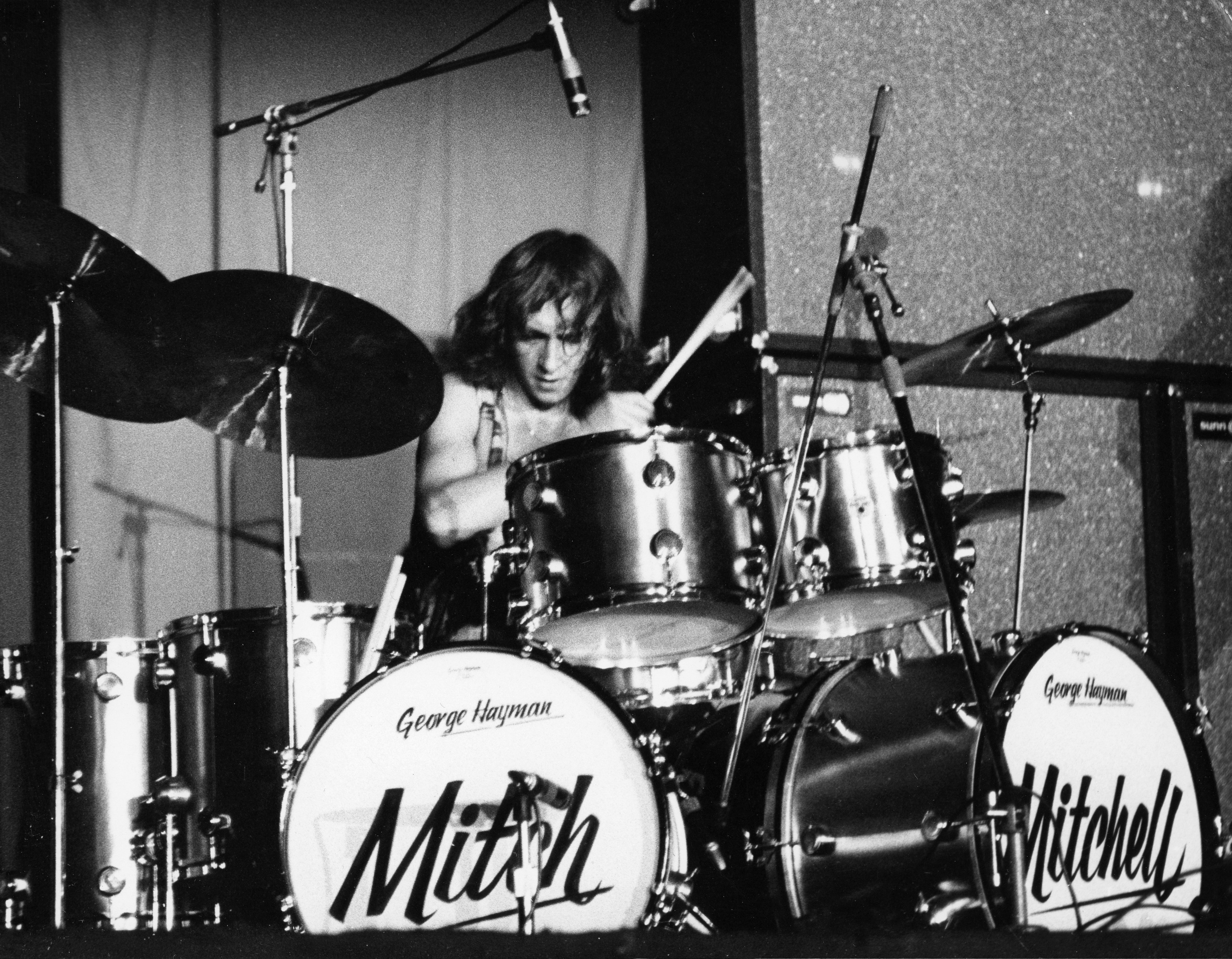

=== Other projects ===
In December 1968, Mitchell played with the Dirty Mac, an impromptu band assembled for The Rolling Stones Rock and Roll Circus. Others included John Lennon as vocalist and rhythm guitarist "Winston Leg-Thigh"; Yoko Ono providing improvised primal screams; Eric Clapton as guitarist, and Keith Richards as bassist. The group recorded a cover of "Yer Blues" as well as a jam called "Whole Lotta Yoko". While working with Hendrix from late 1969 until early 1970, Mitchell also collaborated with the Jack Bruce and Friends band fronted by ex-Cream bassist/vocalist Jack Bruce, with keyboardist Mike Mandel and jazz-fusion guitarist and future the Eleventh House frontman Larry Coryell.

=== Post-Hendrix ===
After Hendrix' death, Mitchell finished production work with engineer Eddie Kramer on incomplete Hendrix recordings, resulting in the releases The Cry of Love and Rainbow Bridge. In 1972, he teamed up with guitarists Mike Pinera and April Lawton to form Ramatam. They recorded the first of Ramatam's two albums and were an opening act for Emerson, Lake & Palmer at a number of concerts. Mitchell and Hendrix had been offered spots in the band Keith Emerson and Greg Lake were forming, but Carl Palmer got the drum position instead. Ramatam never achieved commercial success, and Mitchell left the act before their second album was released. He also performed in concerts with Terry Reid, Jack Bruce, and Jeff Beck as a substitute for drummer Cozy Powell. Mitchell drummed alongside John Halsey in the 1970s jam band Hinkley's Heroes, the only time he played alongside another drummer. In 1974, he auditioned for Paul McCartney's band Wings but lost the part to Geoff Britton in another coin toss.

For the rest of the 1970s through to the 1990s, Mitchell, semi-retired and living in Europe, continued to perform and occasionally record. In 1986, Mitchell teamed up with jazz musician Greg Parker and made a music video session of Led Zeppelin's "Black Dog". He did session work on Junior Brown's Long Walk Back and participated in various Hendrix-related recordings, videos, and interviews. In 1999, Mitchell was part of the Gypsy Sun Experience, along with former Hendrix bassist Billy Cox and guitarist Gary Serkin. He also appeared on Bruce Cameron's album Midnight Daydream that included Billy Cox, Buddy Miles and Jack Bruce.

=== Death ===
Mitchell played as a guest musician on the first Experience Hendrix tour, which opened in Seattle, Washington, and ran from 22 to 26 February 2004. He later joined the 2008 Experience Hendrix Tour, an 18-city US tour that ended in Portland, Oregon, on 7 November. The tour also featured Billy Cox, Buddy Guy, Jonny Lang, Robby Krieger, Kenny Wayne Shepherd, Eric Johnson, Cesar Rosas, David Hidalgo, Brad Whitford, Hubert Sumlin, Chris Layton, Eric Gales, and Mato Nanji.

Five days after the tour ended, Mitchell was found dead in his Portland hotel room on 12 November 2008. Erin Patrick, a deputy medical examiner, said that Mitchell appeared to have died of natural causes. Tour spokesman Bob Merlis said that Mitchell had remained in Portland for a four-day holiday and had planned to leave on the day he died. Merlis, who had seen him perform two weeks earlier in Los Angeles, said that Mitchell had appeared healthy and upbeat. The Guardian also reported that Mitchell had just completed the Experience Hendrix tribute tour at the time of his death. Reflecting on Mitchell's legacy, Janie Hendrix, chief executive of the Experience Hendrix Tour and Jimi Hendrix' stepsister said, "He was a wonderful man, a brilliant musician and a true friend. His role in shaping the sound of the Jimi Hendrix Experience cannot be underestimated.[sic]"

== Legacy ==
Queen drummer Roger Taylor has described Mitchell as his early role model. He said: "I still think listening to Mitch Mitchell, especially the early stuff with Hendrix, is just fantastic". Matt Sorum, drummer with the Cult, Guns N' Roses, and Velvet Revolver, has praised his "pure musicianship" and called him "one of the greatest drummers of all time".

Janie Hendrix, Jimi Hendrix's stepsister and CEO of the Experience Hendrix Tour with which Mitchell had been playing said of the drummer: "He was a wonderful man, a brilliant musician and a true friend. His role in shaping the sound of the Jimi Hendrix Experience cannot be underestimated.

Drummer for The Police, Stewart Copeland named the Jimi Hendrix Experience's debut album Are You Experienced as one of the 12 records that changed his life, saying, "Mitch Mitchell blew me away, of course [...] the shit he did was remarkable. All of this stuff I did that I was rather proud of, I thought I came up with it. But no, I got it from Mitch."

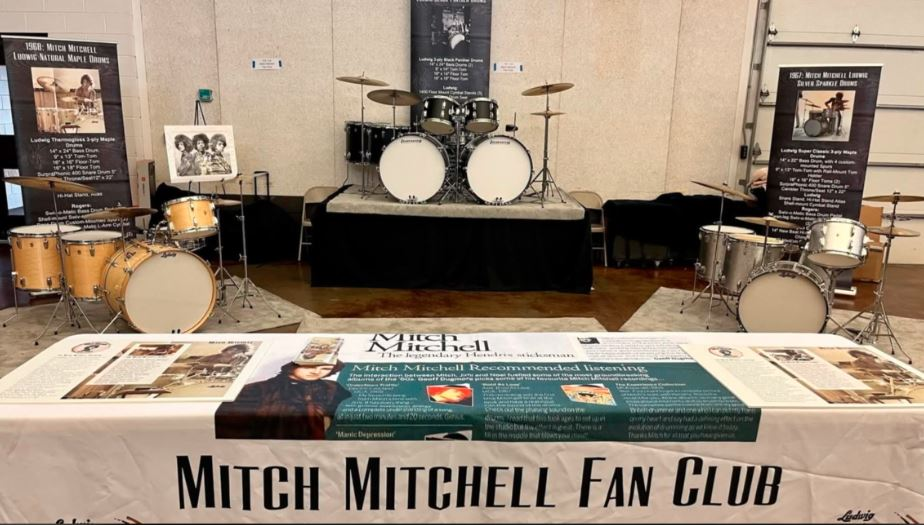
Replicas of Mitchell's 1967, 1968, and 1969 drum kits at the Chicago Drum Show

Mitch Mitchell's daughter, Aysha Mitchell and granddaughter Sophia Mitchell Rosas display a photo of the Hendrix experience with Kevin John Simon, founder of the Mitch Mitchell Facebook Fan Club. Behind them are three perfect replicas of Mitchell's drum kits assembled by Simon.

In 2013, professional American drummer and Mitch Mitchell historian, Kevin John Simon, founded the Mitch Mitchell Fan Club on Facebook. On October 14, 2026, the fan club accepted its 8000th member. The site also sponsors a sister site at https://www.mitchdrummer.com where people can listen to Mitchell's songs when he played with Hendrix and in the following years. In 2020, Simon began to build three perfect replicas of Mitchell's 1967, 1968 and 1969 drum kits. The kits have appeared at drum shows in the United States since 2022. The kits are constructed of the same style of Ludwig drums and Rogers hardware that Mitchell used . In 2021, Bart van der Zee of Drum History Podcast posted an extensive interview on Mitch Mitchell with Kevin Simon on YouTube. The interview included detailed information on Mitchell's background, pre-Hendrix experience and work with the Jimi Hendrix Experience including a complete timeline of the Hendrix Experience tours. Simon also explained and how Mitch's drum kits changed over his years with Hendrix Experience as Mitchell switched over to Ludwig kits from Premier. Mitch was had used a Premier kit at the Monterey Pop Festival in June 1967. Later that summer, he changed to Ludwig drums, which he continued using through 1967, 1968, and 1969.

In 2016, Mitchell was named the eighth-greatest drummer of all time by Rolling Stone magazine.

== Discography ==
For a more complete listing of Mitchell's recordings with Hendrix, see Jimi Hendrix discography and Jimi Hendrix posthumous discography.

- 1966: Georgie Fame – Sweet Things
- 1967: Wishful Thinking – Count to Ten – (Decca F12598, UK, DK)
- 1967: The Jimi Hendrix Experience – Are You Experienced
- 1967: The Jimi Hendrix Experience – Axis: Bold As Love
- 1968: The Jimi Hendrix Experience – Electric Ladyland
- 1969: Martha Veléz – Fiends and Angels
- 1971: Jimi Hendrix – The Cry of Love
- 1971: Jimi Hendrix – Rainbow Bridge
- 1972: Jimi Hendrix – War Heroes
- 1972: Ramatam – Ramatam
- 1975: Mitch Mitchell – Squeeze My Little Finger / Put Your Faith in Me
- 1980: Roger Chapman – Mail Order Magic
- 1982: The Dave Morrison Band – Someone's in my kitchen
- 1986: Greg Parker – Black Dog
- 1996: David Torn – What Means Solid, Traveller?
- 1998: Junior Brown – Long Walk Back
- 1999: Bruce Cameron – Midnight Daydream
