= Jimi Hendrix's unfinished fourth studio album =

Unfinished project by Jimi Hendrix

The American musician Jimi Hendrix intended to release his fourth studio album as a double or triple LP before Christmas 1970. From June to August 1970, he made good progress on the realization of the planned album in his new Electric Lady Studios. Many songs were mixed on August 20, 22 and 24. Four of these mixes were regarded as definitive versions and were presented at the opening party of Electric Lady on August 26. Hendrix died on September 18 that year, leaving behind an enormous number of unreleased recordings in various stages of completion. It is impossible to know what Hendrix would have changed and what he actually would have released, but there is some documentation of the album configurations he had in mind. While a good amount of the designated tracks only needed some finishing touches, others only existed as rough recordings, and for some titles no recordings are known to exist. The Cry of Love (1971), Voodoo Soup (1995) and First Rays of the New Rising Sun (1997) are officially released attempts to reconstruct the planned album. First Rays of the New Rising Sun is usually regarded as closest to Hendrix's vision, but features a track that was probably never part of Hendrix's plans and omits some tracks that were definitely considered. The 2024 box set Electric Lady Studios: A Jimi Hendrix Vision contains 38 previously unreleased tracks from the album sessions and a 5.1 surround mix of First Rays of the New Rising Sun with 3 bonus tracks. Most tracks that are known to have been considered for the album have eventually been released in some form or other, except for a few unfinished and unidentified titles.

== Background ==
After finishing the double album Electric Ladyland in 1968, Hendrix recorded quite obsessively in several studios. The extensive sessions for Electric Ladyland had been a reason for Chas Chandler to quit his role of producer, and also soured Hendrix's relation with bass player Noel Redding. When Redding eventually quit The Jimi Hendrix Experience at the end of June 1969, Hendrix had already started recording with old-time friend and bass player Billy Cox. For much of 1969 and 1970, Hendrix was troubled by the constant touring, disappointments with new band line-ups (first the Gypsy Sun and Rainbows—despite a successful performance at the Woodstock festival—and then the Band of Gypsys), demands of manager Michael Jeffrey, girlfriend troubles, the pressure of fame, heavy drug use, and personal as well as professional insecurities. Hendrix's extensive use of hired studio time became very expensive and was not always fruitful.

In 1969, plans for Hendrix's own nightclub in New York City were converted into a plan for his own recording studio. Electric Lady's Studio A was designed to serve as Hendrix's personal creative space; an inspiring environment where he could develop his music from demos to final mixes, with a supportive team and the best equipment available. After being under construction for 13 months, the first session at Electric Lady's Studio A took place on June 15, 1970, while Studio B was still unfinished. The studio finally provided creative continuity in a safe haven, but also a place where he could find some rest. There was 24-hour security and engineer Eddie Kramer set strict rules to stop having hordes of guests in the studio. Despite the lack of pay for the sessions, Hendrix was mostly joined by the current Experience band members Billy Cox and Mitch Mitchell. Mitchell even had to battle Jeffrey for back royalties and tour receipts and it may initially have been unpleasant for him that many tracks that were worked on had Buddy Miles's drum parts, but eventually Mitchell got into the creative spirit of working on the album as much as Cox. Hendrix and his team soon showed much progress in the creation of a new album, so the studio time of August 1970 was almost exclusively used for mixing and overdubbing sessions to finish the recorded songs. On August 26, 1970, four complete songs with final mixes were presented at the Electric Lady opening party. The next morning, Hendrix left for Europe to perform at a couple of festivals and would never see his studio again: he died in London on September 18, 1970.

== Tracks considered for inclusion ==
On June 14, 1970, a memo by Hendrix listed 11 songs "having backing tracks completed", with the last entries "Drifter's Escape" and "Burning Desire" receiving question marks. This memo also noted to get the tape of "Highway Chile".

An expanded list of 25 titles was handwritten by Hendrix (reportedly on August 14, 1970) under the heading "Songs for L.P. Strate Ahead". The running order is the same for the 11 tracks of the previous list, but many tracks are added in between. The songs with complete backing tracks were marked with crosses. The list also had songs marked with ticks and dashes, but the meaning of those marks is unknown.

"Message to Love", "Power of Soul", and "Machine Gun" had been recorded in the studio before live versions were released on the Band of Gypsys (1970). Hendrix seemed to think that releasing studio versions of these songs would be regressive and not in tune with his ideas for the new album. Nonetheless, mixes of "Power of Soul" (with a new delay effect in the intro) and "Message to Love" were created on August 22, 1970.

Another list on a tape box detailed the configuration for three sides of a double album with the title First Rays of the New Rising Sun. Side D was left blank and "Night Bird Flying" appeared twice, on different sides of the LP.

Although work in August 1970 was reserved for finalizing tracks for the album with overdubs and mixes, several tracks that were not on the lists received attention during these sessions (possibly because new recordings were made after the lists were compiled).

Possible tracks recorded for Jimi Hendrix's unfinished fourth studio album
Title	Status	Last studio work	Tape box note placement	Strate Ahead placement	June 24 memo placement	Live performances	Availability	Notes
"Ezy Ryder"	Final mix	1970-08-22 (mix)	B1	01	01	23x	First Rays of the New Rising Sun (1997) - track 7	Presented at Electric Lady opening party (1970-08-26). An early demo that ran for 20 minutes under the title, Ezy Ryder/MLK Mix (Captain Coconut) appeared on Burning Desire in 2006.
"Room Full of Mirrors"	Almost finished mix	1970-08-20 (mix)	A3	02	02	19x	First Rays of the New Rising Sun (1997) - track 5	A live recording was first released on Experience in 1971 before the unaltered rough mix of 1970-08-20 was released two months later on Rainbow Bridge.
"Earth Blues"	Complete	1970-06-26	-	03	03	-	The Jimi Hendrix Experience (2000) - disc 4, track 2	First mixed in April 1970, with further overdubs in June. A new mix by Kramer and John Jansen incorporating those was released on Rainbow Bridge in 1971. The original recording by Band of Gypsys from 12-19-1969 was released on People, Hell and Angels in 2013.
"Valleys of Neptune"	Unfinished	1970-06-26	-	04	-	-	Valleys of Neptune (2010) - track 2 Electric Lady Studios - disc 1, track 2 Electric Lady Studios - disc 2, track 9	Many versions were recorded between 1969 and 1970 but none were marked as complete.
"Straight Ahead (Have You Heard)"	Final mix	1970-08-22 (mix)	B4	05	04	4x	First Rays of the New Rising Sun (1997) - track 12	Presented at Electric Lady opening party (1970-08-26), possibly in Kramer's 1970-08-20 mix. The mix attempt by Hendrix and Kramer from 1970-08-22 was discarded.
"Cherokee Mist" (instrumental)	Rough mix	1970-08-22 (mix)	C5	06	-	-	The Jimi Hendrix Experience (2000) - disc 4, track 9	The available version is a 1999 mix by Kramer of a 1970-06-24 jam session which featured a version of "Straight Ahead" and "Valleys of Neptune". Proper studio takes, under the title "Cherokee Mist (Valleys of Neptune)" were attempted. Many overdubs and a rough mix were created on 08-22-1970 but are all, as of yet, unreleased.
"Freedom"	Almost finished mix	1970-08-24 (mix)	A5	07	05	23x	First Rays of the New Rising Sun (1997) - track 1	Hendrix wanted to replace eight seconds of rhythm guitar.
"Stepping Stone"	Almost finished	1970-06-26	-	08	06	-	First Rays of the New Rising Sun (1997) - track 10	While a single version had been released, Hendrix had Miles's drumming replaced by Mitchell, overdubbed a vocal and kept overdubbing guitar parts.
"Izabella"	Complete	1970-06-26	-	09	07	-	First Rays of the New Rising Sun (1997) - track 2	Released as a single, but quickly withdrawn (see below). Hendrix wanted a new mix that would incorporate the replaced drums and guitar overdubs recorded in June. A live recording was first released on Woodstock Two (1971).
"Astro Man"	Almost finished mix	1970-08-22 (mix)	B2	10	08	-	First Rays of the New Rising Sun (1997) - track 15	A few finishing touches were planned.
"Drifter's Escape"	Almost finished mix	1970-08-22 (mix)	C2	11	10	-	South Saturn Delta (1997) - track 14	Hendrix intended to perfect some guitar overdubs, bootlegs show many alternate overdubs as well.
"Angel"	Rough mix	1970-08-20 (mix)	C6	12	-	-	First Rays of the New Rising Sun (1997) - track 4	Hendrix wanted to further refine the song. His last rough mix of it was released on Electric Lady Studios. In November 1970, Kramer made a new mix with posthumous drum overdubs by Mitchell. An early demo from 1967 under the title, Sweet Angel was released on South Saturn Delta in 1997.
"Bleeding Heart"	Rough mix	1970-08-22 (mix)	-	13	-	-	Electric Lady Studios - disc 3, track 10	Hendrix recorded three different studio arrangements at the Record Plant which were released on Blues, Valleys of Neptune and People, Hell and Angels. A new studio version was recorded and remixed at Electric Lady Studios and was released on War Heroes and South Saturn Delta, before coming out in its original Hendrix mix on the Electric Lady Studios box set.
"Burning Desire"	Unfinished	1970-01-23	-	14	11	-	West Coast Seattle Boy (2010) - disc 4, track 2	Hendrix was uncertain whether the backing track was complete on 1970-06-24. An instrumental take from 1970-01-16 is available on West Coast Seattle Boy and a December 1969 rehearsal with vocals on The Baggy's Rehearsal Sessions (2002).
"Night Bird Flying"	Final mix	1970-08-24 (mix)	A2/C1	15	09	-	First Rays of the New Rising Sun (1997) - track 3	Presented at Electric Lady opening party (1970-08-26), mastered for a planned single release. An early demo from 1968 under the title, "Ships Passing Through the Night" appeared on Valleys of Neptune in 2010.
"Electric Lady"	Unidentified		-	16	-		-	Hendrix marked it as "slow". Rumored to be "Pali Gap", due to it being recorded under the working title "Slow Part" and at Electric Lady Studios.
"Getting My Heart Back Together Again (Hear My Train A Comin')"	Unfinished	1969-05-21	-	17	-	50x	People, Hell and Angels (2013) - track 3	Recorded several times without achieving a definitive master, Kramer tagged the end of take 2 onto take 3 (both from 1969-05-21) in a mix for the 2013 release. Music critics considered the live recording at the Berkeley Community Theatre to be the definitive version which can be found on Rainbow Bridge and Blues.
"Lover Man"	Rough mix	1970-07-20 (mix)	-	18	-	24x	The Jimi Hendrix Experience (2000) - disc 4, track 7	The rough mix of 20 July was not very satisfying, but Hendrix seems not to have worked on the song afterward. The available version is a new mix by Kramer.
"Midnight Lightning"	Rough mix	1970-08-22 (mix)	-	19	-	1x	Electric Lady Studios - disc 03, track 04	What was mixed on 08-22-1970 is presumably the take recorded on 1970-07-14, but this mix remains unreleased. The available version is a new mix by Kramer, in a medley with "Beginnings".
"Heaven Has No Tomorrow"	Unfinished	1970-06-26	-	20	-	-	Electric Lady Studios - disc 2, track 7	a.k.a. "Heaven Has No Sorrow"
"Sending My Love"	Unfinished	1970-01-16	-	21	-	-	Both Sides of the Sky (2018) - track 12	a.k.a. "Send My Love to Linda" (presumably). Rumored to be "Send My Love to Joan Arc" due to the unreleased demo having similar chords and appears on the tracklisting for Black Gold.
"This Little Boy"	Unidentified		-	22	-	-	-	-
"Local Commotion"	Unfinished	1970	-	23	-	-	-	Appears on the tracklisting for Black Gold, but remains unreleased
"Dolly Dagger"	Final mix	1970-08-24 (mix)	A1	24	-	2x	First Rays of the New Rising Sun (1997) - track 6	Presented at Electric Lady opening party (1970-08-26), mastered for a planned single release.
"The New Rising Sun (Hey Baby)"	Rough mix	1970-08-22 (mix)	-	25	-	16x	First Rays of the New Rising Sun (1997) - track 13	Two takes were recorded on 1970-07-01 with take 2 being the most complete, Hendrix wanted to record a new vocal track. The medley with "Bolero" was mixed on 22 August and released on Electric Lady Studios. The song was remixed by Kramer for Rainbow Bridge.
"Belly Button Window"	Roughly mixed solo demo	1970-08-24 (mix)	A4	-	-	-	First Rays of the New Rising Sun (1997) - track 17	A basic track was recorded with the new Experience on 1970-07-23 and a rough mix was created on 20–08–1970, but Hendrix and Kramer were very fond of a very different solo demo of which they created a rough mix on 1970-08-24 (the released version).
"Drifting"	Rough mix	1970-08-20 (mix)	B3	-	-	-	Electric Lady Studios - disc 2, track 14	Hendrix considered adding vibraphone chords or another rhythm guitar. In late 1970, Kramer made a mix incorporating vibes played by Buzzy Linhart and Mitchell replaced his drum parts.
"Come Down Hard on Me"	Rough mix	1970-08-22 (mix)	C3	-	-	-	The Jimi Hendrix Experience (2000) - disc 4, track 10	Recordings and a rough mix were made on 1970-08-22. The available version is a 1972 composite mix by Kramer and Jansen.
"Beginnings"	Rough mix	1970-08-22 (mix)	C4	-	-	3x	First Rays of the New Rising Sun (1997) - track 9	Recordings and a rough mix were made on 1970-08-22. The available version is a 1972 mix by Kramer and Jansen. A live recording was first released on Woodstock Two as "Jam Back at the House."
"In from the Storm"	Nearly finished mix	1970-08-24 (mix)	-	-	-	5x	Electric Lady Studios - disc 03, track 06	Lead guitar and vocal overdubs were recorded on 1970-08-20, mixed several times afterward, but none approved as final. The latest mix is from 1970-08-24.
"Power of Soul"	Rough mix	1970-08-22 (mix)	-	-	-	6x	Both Sides of the Sky - track 6	A mix was created by Hendrix and either engineer Bob Hughes or Kramer on 1970-08-22. A live recording had already been released on Band of Gypsys.
"Message to Love"	Rough mix	1970-08-22 (mix)	-	-	-	6x	West Coast Seattle Boy (2010) - disc 3, track 11	A mix was created by Hendrix and Kramer on 1970-08-22. A live recording had already been released on Band of Gypsys.
"Bolero"	Rough mix	1970-08-22 (mix)	-	-	-	-	Electric Lady Studios - disc 3, track 7	An instrumental recorded on 1970-07-01 with a take on 1970-07-14 that was marked as DO NOT USE. Kramer later mixed it for release on West Coast Seattle Boy (2010) for which it was edited and flown together into "Hey Baby (New Rising Sun)" (a 1970-8-22 mix of this medley was later released on the Electric Lady Studios box set).

=== Abandoned Electric Lady recordings ===
Almost all the recordings at Electric Lady were made with the planned album in mind, but some were incidental jams or compositions that were abandoned:

- "All God's Children": an instrumental backing track recorded on 1970-06-15 onto which Hendrix possibly wanted to overdub vocals later.
- "Messing Around": a funky instrumental that was abandoned after 20 takes on 1970-06-16; take 17 was released on the Electric Lady Studios box set in 2024.
- "Farther Up the Road": a short cover of the blues standard, recorded on 1970-06-24 and released on the Electric Lady Studios box set in 2024.
- "Pali Gap": originally part of a circa 10-minute instrumental jam recorded on 1970-07-01. Hendrix realized it had some potential and overdubbed a second guitar and a solo to what would be marked as "Slow Part" on the tape box. Kramer claims it was never intended to be on the planned album. Jeffrey later gave it the title "Pali Gap" to tie it to the Hawaiian locale of the Rainbow Bridge film in 1971, when it was to be released on the accompanying soundtrack album.
- "Slow Blues": less than three minutes of a jam that was only recorded partly on 1970-08-20. A 1:46 edit was released on the Jimi Hendrix Experience box set in 2000.
- "The Star-Spangled Banner": a single take was made on 1969-03-18 with no further work until it was mixed by Kramer for Rainbow Bridge in 1971. The famous live performance on the Woodstock festival was released on the triple soundtrack LP in May 1970. It was also the B-Side to "Dolly Dagger".
- "My Friend": although never intended for a Hendrix album, the song was debuted in 1968 during the Electric Ladyland sessions; this version was later mixed and published on The Cry of Love in 1971. A later recording made in 1970 was created for what would have been a new album by Noel Redding with Hendrix providing guitar on it; this version remains unreleased as does the rest of the recordings for that album.

== Album titles ==
Hendrix had preferred the title First Rays of the New Rising Sun since January 1969. Kramer believed this would have been the definitive title and it was used for the official reconstructed album release in 1997.

Hendrix christened his 1970 tour The Cry of Love Tour in an interview. During the tour, "Lover Man", "Hear My Train A Comin'", "Freedom", "Hey Baby (Land of the New Rising Sun)", "Ezy Ryder", "Machine Gun", "The Star-Spangled Banner", "Straight Ahead", "Midnight Lightning", "Dolly Dagger", "Room Full of Mirrors", and "In from the Storm" were performed, along with tracks from his previous albums and singles. Hendrix's first posthumous studio album, released in 1971, was named after the tour.

When work in his Electric Lady Studios advanced, Hendrix imagined the album could become a triple, under the title People, Hell and Angels. In 2013, this title was used for a compilation of unreleased material.

A memo from August 1970 in his handwriting had 25 titles under the heading "Songs for L.P. Strate Ahead".

== Singles ==
On April 13, 1970, Reprise Records released "Stepping Stone" b/w "Izabella" as a 7-inch single credited to "Hendrix Band of Gypsys". It was reportedly recalled because it could interfere with the sales of the Band of Gypsys live album that was delivered to Capitol Records to fulfil a contractual obligation.

A single with "Dolly Dagger" b/w "Night Bird Flying" was mastered on August 26, 1970, but the planned release by Reprise Records was cancelled after Hendrix's death. This single was later issued in 1997 as promotion for First Rays of the New Rising Sun.

== Posthumous releases ==
Of the ten tracks on The Cry of Love, nine songs were on Hendrix's lists and/or were being prepared for the album by Hendrix during the mixing sessions in August 1970. The other track, "My Friend", was recorded in 1968. After Michael Jeffrey had decided to hold back "Dolly Dagger" and "Room Full of Mirrors" for release on Rainbow Bridge, the tracks "My Friend" and "Straight Ahead" were selected instead. Kramer and Mitchell provided some finishing touches to "Drifting", "Angel" and "In from the Storm". A rough mix of a demo for "Belly Button Window" was included without alterations.

Voodoo Soup (1995) was producer Alan Douglas' attempt to compile the unfinished album. This included two tracks recorded in 1968, "The New Rising Sun" and "Peace in Mississippi", the first of which seems to be connected to "Hey Baby" only by name. All tracks were remixed from scratch and quite a few of them had new overdubbed drum tracks, erasing the original parts by Mitchell or Buddy Miles.

First Rays of the New Rising Sun (1997) is the officially released attempt by Experience Hendrix (his family estate's company), in collaboration with Kramer, to reconstruct the planned double album. It is a compilation of 17 songs that previously appeared on The Cry of Love, Rainbow Bridge (both from 1971) and War Heroes (1972). Like The Cry of Love, it includes the 1968 recording of "My Friend", while the other 16 tracks were more clearly intended for the album.

Many of the tracks have been released over the years in several different versions, including mixes that Hendrix made during the sessions of August 20, 22 and 24, 1970.
