= Experience Hendrix: The Best of Jimi Hendrix =

1997 greatest hits album by Jimi Hendrix

Greatest hits album by Jimi Hendrix
- Released: 1997
- Recorded: October 1966 – October 1970
- Genre: Rock
- Length: 73:32
- Label: MCA; Legacy (2010 reissue)
- Compiler: Janie Hendrix; John McDermott

Jimi Hendrix chronology
First Rays of the New Rising Sun (1997)	Experience Hendrix: The Best of Jimi Hendrix (1997)	South Saturn Delta (1997)

Experience Hendrix: The Best of Jimi Hendrix is a compilation album of songs by American rock musician Jimi Hendrix, released in 1997 by MCA and reissued in 2010 by Legacy Recordings. The single compact disc collects 20 songs spanning his career, from his first recordings with the Jimi Hendrix Experience in 1966 to his last with Billy Cox and Mitch Mitchell in 1970.

Experience Hendrix is the first comprehensive collection of Hendrix's songs overseen by Experience Hendrix, a family company that took over management of his recording legacy in 1997. Fifteen songs with the Experience band are included, as well as five with Hendrix's later backing musicians. No songs from the Band of Gypsys lineup with Buddy Miles are included. (Note: "It's Too Bad" was recorded with Buddy Miles and Larry Young without Billy Cox.) Experience Hendrix replaces the best-selling 1992 compilation The Ultimate Experience, which features a similar track list but contains fewer songs from posthumous releases.

== Reception and charts ==
In a review for AllMusic, Bruce Eder gave the compilation four out of five stars. He felt that the collection "just misses being the perfect single-CD Jimi Hendrix anthology": while the compilation includes some of Hendrix's noteworthy later work, it lacks several songs from his earlier Smash Hits compilation.

The album reached number 18 on the UK Albums Chart, number 133 on the US Billboard 200, and number 34 on the Canadian RPM chart. It was ranked number 187 on Nielsen Soundscan's Canadian Top 200 Albums of 2002. In 2006, the Recording Industry Association of America (RIAA) certified it as "2× platinum" for shipping two million copies.

== Track listing ==
The titles and running times are taken from the original Experience Hendrix CD US release. Other releases may show different information. Entries under "Original release" are for both the US and UK, unless otherwise indicated.

All tracks are written by Jimi Hendrix, except where otherwise noted.

Experience Hendrix: The Best of Jimi Hendrix
No.	Title	Original release	Length
1.	"Purple Haze"	Single A-side	2:51
2.	"Fire"	Are You Experienced	2:43
3.	"The Wind Cries Mary"	Single A-side (UK), B-side (US)	3:20
4.	"Hey Joe" (Billy Roberts)	Single A-side	3:29
5.	"All Along the Watchtower" (Bob Dylan)	Single A-side	3:58
6.	"Stone Free"	Single B-side of "Hey Joe" (UK)	3:35
7.	"Crosstown Traffic"	Electric Ladyland	2:19
8.	"Manic Depression"	Are You Experienced	3:42
9.	"Little Wing"	Axis: Bold as Love	2:25
10.	"If 6 Was 9"	Axis: Bold as Love	5:34
11.	"Foxey Lady"	Are You Experienced	3:18
12.	"Bold as Love"	Axis: Bold as Love	4:11
13.	"Castles Made of Sand"	Axis: Bold as Love	2:47
14.	"Red House"	Are You Experienced (UK edition)	3:50
15.	"Voodoo Child (Slight Return)"	Electric Ladyland	5:12
16.	"Freedom"	The Cry of Love	3:25
17.	"Night Bird Flying"	The Cry of Love	3:50
18.	"Angel"	The Cry of Love	4:22
19.	"Dolly Dagger"	Rainbow Bridge	4:45
20.	"Star Spangled Banner" (adapted by Hendrix (Note: Experience Hendrix credits Hendrix, although John Stafford Smith composed the music (no lyrics are used).))	Woodstock: Music from the Original Soundtrack and More (1970)	3:46

Bonus disc

The album was also released in a two-CD limited edition. The bonus disc contains eight tracks, taken from The Jimi Hendrix Experience box set (2000).

All tracks are written by Jimi Hendrix, except where otherwise noted.

Experience Hendrix bonus disc
No.	Title	Original release	Length
1.	"Highway Chile" (alternate recording)	The Jimi Hendrix Experience	3:41
2.	"Gloria" (Van Morrison)	bonus single with The Essential Jimi Hendrix (UK)	8:54
3.	"It's Too Bad" (jam recording)	The Jimi Hendrix Experience	8:53
4.	"Spanish Castle Magic" (rehearsal recording)	The Jimi Hendrix Experience	5:50
5.	"Hear My Train A Comin'" (rehearsal recording)	The Jimi Hendrix Experience	6:58
6.	"Lover Man" (demo recording)	The Jimi Hendrix Experience	2:58
7.	"I Don't Live Today" (live)	Lifelines: The Jimi Hendrix Story bonus disc	6:34
8.	"Purple Haze" (live)	Stages disc three	4:03

== Personnel ==
Personnel information is taken from the original Experience Hendrix CD US release; other releases may show different information.

=== Musicians ===
- Jimi Hendrix – guitar, vocals; bass on "All Along the Watchtower"; piano and kazoo on "Crosstown Traffic"; glockenspiel on "Little Wing"; bass and harpsichord on "Bold as Love"; piano on "If 6 Was 9", "Freedom"
- Mitch Mitchell – drums: all tracks, except "It's Too Bad"
- Noel Redding – bass guitar: all tracks, except 5, 12, 16–20, bonus tracks 3, 6; backing vocals on "Purple Haze", "Fire", "Crosstown Traffic"
- Billy Cox – bass guitar: 16–20 and "Lover Man"
- Buddy Miles – drums: "It's Too Bad"
- Juma Sultan – percussion on "Freedom", "Dolly Dagger", "Star Spangled Banner"
- Jerry Velez – percussion on "Star Spangled Banner"
- Larry Lee – rhythm guitar on "Star Spangled Banner"
- The Breakaways – backing vocals on "Hey Joe"
- Dave Mason – acoustic guitar on "All Along the Watchtower"; backing vocals on "Crosstown Traffic"
- Arthur & Albert Allen – background vocals on "Freedom", "Dolly Dagger"

=== Cover image ===
- David Montgomery – photographer (front cover)

== Certifications ==
Region	Certification	Certified units/sales
Argentina (CAPIF)	Gold	30,000^{^}
Australia (ARIA)	Gold	35,000^{^}
Italy (FIMI)	Gold	25,000^{*}
Norway (IFPI Norway)	Gold	25,000^{*}
United Kingdom (BPI)	Platinum	300,000^{‡}
United States (RIAA)	3× Platinum	3,000,000^{‡}
^{*} Sales figures based on certification alone.^{^} Shipments figures based on certification alone.^{‡} Sales+streaming figures based on certification alone.
