= Hey Baby (New Rising Sun) =

Jimi Hendrix song

Song by Jimi Hendrix

from the album Rainbow Bridge
- Released: October 1971
- Recorded: July 1, 1970
- Studio: Electric Lady, New York City
- Genre: Rock
- Length: 6:05
- Label: Reprise
- Songwriter: Jimi Hendrix
- Producers: Jimi Hendrix; Mitch Mitchell; Eddie Kramer; John Jansen

"Hey Baby (New Rising Sun)" or simply "Hey Baby" is a song written and recorded by American musician Jimi Hendrix, from his second posthumous album Rainbow Bridge (1971). The song is a slower and more melodic piece, which features the prominent use of chorus- and tremolo-effects on guitar. Hendrix uses an idealized feminine figure that recurs in several of his lyrics. Commentators have seen the song as representative of his post-Band of Gypsys musical direction.

"Hey Baby" was in development for over two years and Hendrix had recorded several demo and jam versions, before debuting it in concert on April 25, 1970. On July 1, he recorded a version live at the new Electric Lady Studios in New York City. It was one of the tracks Hendrix proposed for his planned, but never completed, fourth studio album.

In 1971, longtime Hendrix recording engineer Eddie Kramer, and drummer Mitch Mitchell selected the Electric Lady version as the closing track for Rainbow Bridge. The song received mainly positive comments from critics, who saw it as expressing hope, along with new guitar textures. In 1997, "Hey Baby" was included on First Rays of the New Rising Sun, the most comprehensive attempt at presenting Hendrix's unfinished album. During the 1970 The Cry of Love Tour, Hendrix performed the song regularly. Several live recordings have been officially released along with videos of Hendrix performing it in concert.

== Composition and lyrics ==
As early as October 1968 at TTG Studios in Hollywood, California, Hendrix began recording demos for a song titled "The New Rising Sun". Although it is substantially a different song, Hendrix biographer John McDermott believed that "Hey Baby" was developed from ideas found in "The New Rising Sun". In the months following the TTG sessions, Hendrix attempted more recordings of the song at the Record Plant in New York City. Preliminarily titled "Hey Gypsy Boy" and "Hey Country Boy", they were closer to "Hey Baby" musically and lyrically. Hendrix used a minor-key chord progression reminiscent of "All Along the Watchtower", but they lacked the distinctive guitar intro section to "Hey Baby".

In February 1970, Hendrix jammed on an informal "Hey Baby" at the Record Plant, with drummer Buddy Miles and percussionist Juma Sultan. Hendrix sang the song live and included some Spanish flamenco-style flourishes on electric guitar. After parting ways with Miles, Hendrix began preparing songs with original Jimi Hendrix Experience drummer Mitch Mitchell and Band of Gypsys bassist Billy Cox, for the upcoming The Cry of Love Tour. McDermott described Cox's and Mitchell's approaches as "delicate interplay ... more subtle and intricate", which was needed for R&B-influenced songs, such as "Hey Baby".

The trio debuted the song at the Forum in Los Angeles on April 25, 1970. Unlike the later studio version, Hendrix begins the song with solo guitar reminiscent of "the acoustic-guitar introductions found in Spanish flamenco music as, unaccompanied, Hendrix explores arabesques and altered scales", according to music writer Keith Shadwick. The solo guitar became a regular feature of Hendrix's live performances of "Hey Baby" and its length varied to suit his mood and the audience reaction. Hendrix chronicler Harry Shapiro described Hendrix's guitar sound as having a "pitch and sway like waves gently rolling against a deserted sandy beach in early morning". During late-1969 and 1970, Hendrix was making extensive use of a Uni-Vibe guitar effects unit, which is able to emulate the wavering chorus- and tremolo-effects of a Leslie speaker. This effect had previously been used on the demos for "The New Rising Sun". Writers Dave Whitehill and Dave Rubin commented: "the thick chorusing does give it a lot more cohesiveness and depth [which a dry or straight sound would lack] it's very effective in the introduction, where the guitar has to carry the full musical weight itself."

"Hey Baby" is composed of an intro section and a main section with a bridge. The intro is one of the longest in a Hendrix song, lasting 51 measures. (Note: At a length of 6:04, "Hey Baby" is the longest of Hendrix's proposed tracks for his fourth studio album, which is included on First Rays of the New Rising Sun; the main section starts about one minute into the song with the vocal beginning at about two and a half minutes.) In the intro, Hendrix takes a chromatic approach with guitar runs and chords at a moderately slow tempo of 66 beats per minute (bpm). After several key and time signature changes, he lands on A minor, which begins the chord progression at a somewhat faster tempo of 81 bpm for the remainder of the song: A minor–G–F–D.

Lyrically, "Hey Baby" echoes a recurring Hendrix theme of an idealized feminine figure, as heard in "May This Be Love", "Little Wing", and "Angel". Journalist Charles Shaar Murray felt that the figure goes beyond "Hendrix's own personal saviour, but [as] a redeemer for all of humanity". Shapiro also described the hope of "a promised land, a new beginning":

Hey baby, where do ya, ch, comin' from?
Oh, she looked at me and smiled and looked at this face.
And said 'I'm coming from the land of the new rising sun.'
Then I said, 'Hey baby, where are ya tryin' to go to?'
Then she said 'I'm going to spread, spread around peace of mind,
And a whole lot of love to you 'n' you.'

Poet David Henderson called the R&B-style bridge section or refrain, which begins with "Girl, I'd like to come along", "the essence of the lyrics of this deceptively straightforward song".

== Recording and studio releases ==
The released studio version of "Hey Baby" was recorded at Hendrix's newly constructed Electric Lady Studios in New York City's Greenwich Village on July 1, 1970. Supporting Hendrix on guitar and vocal were his regular Cry of Love touring partners; Cox on bass guitar and Mitchell on drums. Sultan and an unnamed second percussionist participated in the recording. The vocal was recorded live and Hendrix never completed a final finished vocal track; Hendrix rejected an earlier take of the song, in which he abandoned his vocal because it was flat. During the July 1 session, "Hey Baby" was preceded by "Bolero", an instrumental on which Hendrix had been working. "Bolero" also incorporates some Spanish flamenco-style flourishes and McDermott believed that Hendrix intended the instrumental and "Hey Baby" to flow together as a medley.

In mid-1970, Hendrix included the song with the title "The New Rising Sun [Hey Baby]" on a list of potential tracks for his planned fourth studio album. (Note: McDermott placed Hendrix's proposed track list entry under "August 14, 1970", while Shadwick was less certain, putting it in mid-June 1970.) When Mitchell and recording engineer Eddie Kramer were reviewing songs for The Cry of Love, Hendrix's first posthumous album release of studio recordings in 1971, "Hey Baby" was considered, though ultimately was unused. Instead, it became the closing track on Rainbow Bridge, the second posthumous album produced by Kramer and Mitchell in 1971. It was also listed as the final track on one of his handwritten track listings for his unfinished fourth studio album called Songs for the LP Strate Ahead. McDermott noted: "Because a finished vocal was never recorded, Jimi's original live take, including his question to Kramer 'Is the microphone on?', was left forward in the mix to convey the song's status as a work in progress." Reprise Records issued the album in October 1971 in the US and the following month in the UK; it performed moderately well in the album charts, reaching numbers 15 on the US Billboard 200 and 16 on the UK Official Albums Chart.

For several years, the studio version of "Hey Baby" was unavailable because Rainbow Bridge had gone out-of-print and the album was never released on CD. However, when Experience Hendrix, the family-run successor to Hendrix's recorded legacy gained control, "Hey Baby" was included on the 1997 compilation album, First Rays of the New Rising Sun. The album was the most complete attempt at realizing Hendrix's fourth album and the first to use one of his proposed titles. In 2001, the song was included on the compilation album Voodoo Child: The Jimi Hendrix Collection. An alternate mix, with "Bolero", was included on the posthumous box set West Coast Seattle Boy: The Jimi Hendrix Anthology in 2010. In 2014, the original Rainbow Bridge album was reissued in both CD and LP formats, with "Hey Baby" as the eighth track on the CD.

== Critical reception ==
"Hey Baby" has been viewed favorably by most music journalists. In a contemporary review of Rainbow Bridge for Rolling Stone magazine, Tony Glover described "Hey Baby" as "simple but evocative ... It’s a benediction and a hoping at once". He added that it is "filled with a pure lonesome yearning and introspection that often got squeezed out in favor of things with more flash". Henderson called it "the song that signified his [Hendrix's] new musical head direction" and Shapiro felt that it "might be called his theme song for the seventies".

David Moskowitz commented on Hendrix's guitar playing: "Throughout the song, Jimi's guitar work was an exhibition of his skills at full strength. He made use of the Uni-Vibe guitar effect to enhance his sound and put some teeth into his guitar work." On the other hand, Murray felt that the effect was overused and faulted the recording: "It's a shame that 'Hey Baby (The Land of the New Rising Sun)' was never recorded properly, because the song was clearly of considerable importance to Hendrix. The Rainbow Bridge version is diffident and tentative, little more than a sketch." However, he described the song "as winsomely wistful as anything Hendrix ever wrote".

== Other recordings ==
A demo titled "The New Rising Sun", recorded at the TTG Studios in Hollywood on October 28, 1968, was released on West Coast Seattle Boy: The Jimi Hendrix Anthology (2010). (Note: Interim Hendrix producer Alan Douglas released an edited version of "The New Rising Sun" on Voodoo Soup (1995) and an edited "Hey Gypsy Boy" on Midnight Lightning (1975).) It is a solo instrumental, with multiple guitar overdubs and Hendrix on the drums. In an album review for AllMusic, Sean Westergaard commented: "'New Rising Sun' might be the jewel of the set. Briefly released in heavily edited form on the ill-conceived and atrocious Voodoo Soup compilation, it's a really cool studio collaboration between Jimi and Eddie Kramer that's like a cross between 'And the Gods Made Love' from Electric Ladyland and 'Little Wing' [from Axis: Bold as Love]."

Another demo with the title "Hey Gypsy Boy", recorded at the Record Plant in New York City on March 18, 1969, was issued on People, Hell and Angels (2013). Hendrix provides a vocal and was backed by drummer Buddy Miles and an unnamed bassist. In a separate album review, Westergaard noted "'Hey Gypsy Boy' is very closely related to 'Hey Baby', and may have been an early version. On this cut, Jimi's whammy bar work is quite interesting and not his standard dive-bomb approach."

During The Cry of Love Tour in 1970, "Hey Baby" was added to Hendrix's repertoire. It was one of only two post-Band of Gypsys songs alongside "Freedom" that the trio performed regularly. Hendrix sometimes introduced the song as "The New Rising Sun", including at Berkeley.

- April 25, 1970 – The Forum, Los Angeles: Not officially released, but an amateur recording of the entire concert is available at the official Hendrix website. Hendrix adds an octave doubling technique popularized by jazz guitarist Wes Montgomery during his second solo, which segues into "Villanova Junction". (Note: The slower tempo instrumental "Villanova Junction" features a Wes Montgomery-style octave guitar melody, which was titled "Instrumental Solo" on Woodstock: Music from the Original Soundtrack and More (1970).)
- May 30, 1970 – Community Theatre, Berkeley, California: Live at Berkeley (album, 2003), Jimi Plays Berkeley (video, 1971)
- July 4, 1970 – Atlanta International Pop Festival, Byron, Georgia: Although it was the closing number, neither the album nor video Freedom: Atlanta Pop Festival (2015) contain the song; Shadwick noted that it was out-of-tune.
- July 30, 1970 – Filming for Rainbow Bridge (first set), Maui, Hawaii: The Jimi Hendrix Experience (box set, 2000); in the film Rainbow Bridge, Hendrix performs a medley of "Hey Baby" and "In from the Storm" from the first set and the intro only from the second set before a fade; neither appears on the Rainbow Bridge album.
- August 31, 1970 – Isle of Wight Festival 1970, Isle of Wight, England: Blue Wild Angel: Live at the Isle of Wight (album & video, 2002)
- September 6, 1970 – Love and Peace Festival, Isle of Fehmarn, Germany: Live at the Isle of Fehmarn (album, 2005)

== Notes ==
Footnotes

Sources

- Brown, Tony (1992). Jimi Hendrix: A Visual Documentary – His Life, Loves and Music. London: Omnibus Press. ISBN 978-0-7119-2761-2.
- Fairchild, Michael (1995). Voodoo Soup (liner notes). Jimi Hendrix. Universal City, California: MCA Records. MCAD-11236.
- Glover, Tony (December 9, 1971). "Rainbow Bridge". Rolling Stone. San Francisco.
- Hal Leonard (1992). Jimi Hendrix Reference Library: Octavia and Univibe. Milwaukee, Wisconsin: Bella Godiva Music/Hal Leonard Publishing.
- Henderson, David (2008). 'Scuse Me While I Kiss the Sky: Jimi Hendrix: Voodoo Child. New York City: Simon and Schuster. ISBN 978-1416534341.
- Hendrix, Janie (2003). Jimi Hendrix: The Lyrics. Milwaukee, Wisconsin: Hal Leonard. ISBN 0-634-04930-5.
- Johnson, Chad (2006). Jimi Hendrix: A Step-by-Step Breakdown of His Guitar Styles and Techniques. Milwaukee, Wisconsin: Hal Leonard. ISBN 978-0634077722.
- McDermott, John; Kramer, Eddie (1992). Hendrix: Setting the Record Straight. New York City: Warner Books. ISBN 0-446-39431-9.
- McDermott, John (1997). First Rays of the New Rising Sun (liner notes). Jimi Hendrix. Universal City, California: MCA Records. MCAD-11236.
- McDermott, John; Kramer, Eddie; Cox, Billy (2009). Ultimate Hendrix. New York City: Backbeat Books. ISBN 978-0-87930-938-1.
- McDermott, John (2010). West Coast Seattle Boy: The Jimi Hendrix Anthology (CD/DVD set booklet). Jimi Hendrix. New York City: Sony Music Entertainment. OCLC 762162961. 88697769272.
- McDermott, John (2013). People, Hell and Angels (Album notes). Jimi Hendrix. Legacy Recordings. OCLC 824796650. 88765418982.
- Moskowitz, David (2010). The Words and Music of Jimi Hendrix. Santa Barbara, California: ABC-CLIO. ISBN 978-0313375927.
- Murray, Charles Shaar (1991). Crosstown Traffic (1st. U.S. paperback ed.). New York City: St. Martin's Press. ISBN 0-312-06324-5.
- Roby, Steven (2002). Black Gold: The Lost Archives of Jimi Hendrix. New York City: Billboard Books. ISBN 978-0-8230-7854-7.
- Shadwick, Keith (2003). Jimi Hendrix: Musician (1st ed.). San Francisco: Backbeat Books. ISBN 0-87930-764-1.
- Shapiro, Harry; Glebbeek, Cesar (1990). Jimi Hendrix: Electric Gypsy (1st. U.S. ed.). New York City: St. Martin's Press. ISBN 0-312-05861-6.
