= Voodoo Soup =

Compilation album by Jimi Hendrix
- Released: April 11, 1995
- Recorded: 1968–1970; 1995 (overdubs)
- Studio: Electric Lady, Record Plant, & Olmstead Sound, New York City; TTG, Hollywood
- Genre: Rock
- Length: 56:57
- Label: MCA
- Producer: Alan Douglas

Jimi Hendrix U.S. chronology
| Woodstock (1994) | Voodoo Soup (1995) | First Rays of the New Rising Sun (1997) |

Voodoo Soup is a posthumous compilation album by American rock musician Jimi Hendrix, released in the United States on April 11, 1995, by MCA Records. It was one of the last Hendrix albums produced by Alan Douglas, who was also responsible for the posthumous Hendrix releases Midnight Lightning and Crash Landing in 1975.

== Background ==
Voodoo Soup was Douglas' attempt at presenting Hendrix's planned fourth studio album. The first attempt in 1971, The Cry of Love, produced by drummer Mitch Mitchell and Eddie Kramer (with a credit to Hendrix), was then out of print (last released on CD in 1992; re-released in 2014). After Experience Hendrix, a family company, gained control of his recordings, First Rays of the New Rising Sun was released in 1997 as another attempt to realize the album Hendrix had planned. Since then, Voodoo Soup has remained out of print.

== Critical reception ==
Professional ratings
Review scores
| Source | Rating |
|---|---|
| AllMusic | 2.5/5 stars |
| Chicago Tribune | 3/4 stars |
| Entertainment Weekly | A |
| The Rolling Stone Jazz & Blues Album Guide | 3.5/5 stars |

Reviewing for Entertainment Weekly in 1995, music critic David Browne said that, unlike other assorted compilations of Hendrix's music, Voodoo Soup coheres and sounds "as fluid and cohesive as a preconceived record, without a bad song in the bunch". Vibe magazine called it a valuable release in Hendrix's discography, in spite of Douglas's questionable decision to overdub newly recorded drums to some songs, while a reviewer from Melody Maker said the overly detailed liner notes cannot change the fact "it's opened my ears to the near God-like genius of Jimi Hendrix". Greg Kot of the Chicago Tribune said in his review that the compilation's mostly exceptional songs suggest Hendrix was considering a variety of paths in his music before dying in 1970. Stereo Review magazine's Parke Puterbaugh applauded the recording quality and concluded, "What's most impressive about Voodoo Soup is how contemporary – or, rather, timeless – Hendrix's music sounds a quarter-century later. His creative intensity and musical vitality tower above anything else ever attempted, before or since, in popular music."

Voodoo Soup was later praised by Hendrix biographer Charles Shaar Murray, who claimed it "more than earns its place in the pantheon of great Hendrix albums" as it "brought the Hendrix studio quartet -finally!- to a satisfactory conclusion". AllMusic editor Stephen Thomas Erlewine was more critical in a retrospective review: "For most fans, the re-recorded drum tracks by the drummer of the Knack was the most unforgivable sin, yet the album is also poorly sequenced and lacks several important tracks."

== Track listing ==
All tracks are written by Jimi Hendrix.

| No. | Title | Original version | Length |
|---|---|---|---|
| 1. | "The New Rising Sun" | West Coast Seattle Boy (7:24) (Note: Douglas included versions of "The New Rising Sun" (as "Gypsy Boy"), "Message to Love", and "Peace in Mississippi" on his controversial overdubbed albums produced in 1975.) | 3:21 |
| 2. | "Belly Button Window" | The Cry of Love | 3:34 |
| 3. | "Stepping Stone" | War Heroes | 4:07 |
| 4. | "Freedom" | The Cry of Love | 3:25 |
| 5. | "Angel" | The Cry of Love | 4:18 |
| 6. | "Room Full of Mirrors" | Rainbow Bridge | 3:09 |
| 7. | "Midnight" | War Heroes | 6:01 |
| 8. | "Night Bird Flying" | The Cry of Love | 3:46 |
| 9. | "Drifting" | The Cry of Love | 3:52 |
| 10. | "Ezy Ryder" | The Cry of Love | 4:08 |
| 11. | "Pali Gap" | Rainbow Bridge | 4:42 |
| 12. | "Message to Love" | The Jimi Hendrix Experience | 3:33 |
| 13. | "Peace in Mississippi" | The Jimi Hendrix Experience (reissue) | 5:22 |
| 14. | "In from the Storm" | The Cry of Love | 3:39 |

== Personnel ==
- Jimi Hendrix – guitars, vocals
- Billy Cox – bass guitar
- Mitch Mitchell – drums
- Juma Sultan – percussion
- Buddy Miles – drums on "Ezy Ryder", "Message to Love"
- Noel Redding – bass guitar on "Peace in Mississippi" and "Midnight"
- Bruce Gary – re-recorded drum track on "Room Full of Mirrors" and "Stepping Stone"
- Alan Douglas – production
- Mark Linett – engineer
- Joe Gastwirt – mastering

== Charts ==
Chart performance for Voodoo Soup
| Chart (1995) | Peak position |
|---|---|
| UK Albums (OCC) | 83 |
| US Billboard 200 | 66 |
