= Voodoo Child: The Jimi Hendrix Collection =

Compilation album by Jimi Hendrix
- Released: May 8, 2001
- Recorded: 1966–1970
- Genre: Rock
- Length: 146:19
- Label: MCA
- Compiler: Janie Hendrix, John McDermott

Jimi Hendrix chronology
| The Jimi Hendrix Experience (2000) | Voodoo Child: The Jimi Hendrix Collection (2001) | Live in Ottawa (2001) |

Voodoo Child: The Jimi Hendrix Collection is a two-disc compilation album featuring songs recorded by American rock singer-songwriter and guitarist Jimi Hendrix. It was released on May 8, 2001 by MCA Records. The first disc contains studio recordings, including alternate versions, while the second disc contains live recordings, some of which were previously unreleased. Its accompanying booklet features numerous photos and an essay written by Kurt Loder.

Voodoo Child was generally well received by critics. On April 4, 2006, it was certified gold by the Recording Industry Association of America (RIAA), having sold 500,000 copies in the United States.

== Critical reception ==
Professional ratings
Review scores
| Source | Rating |
|---|---|
| AllMusic | 3/5 stars |
| Blender | 5/5 stars |
| Encyclopedia of Popular Music | 4/5 stars |
| The Rolling Stone Album Guide | 4/5 stars |

Reviewing for Blender magazine, Robert Christgau regarded Voodoo Child as an improvement over the 1997 compilation album Experience Hendrix because, apart from "Manic Depression", it does not leave out any crucial songs. He also believed the second disc features undefinitive but revealing live recordings that made it Hendrix's best live album. Oscar Jordan of Vintage Guitar said the release "blows the previous greatest hits style packages out of the water". While finding the first disc "well-paced" and "an excellent sampler of some of Jimi's best studio work", Jordan was more impressed by the live disc, on which he said "some of the best live recordings ever made of Hendrix reaffirm his status" as "the ultimate live performer and entertainer". AllMusic's Lindsay Planer wrote that, considering the difficulty in curating a compilation of Hendrix's music, Voodoo Child's exceptional song selection and sound quality make it successful as "a thumbnail sketch of Hendrix in both a studio and concert environment … a great touchstone for anyone wishing to begin their Jimi Hendrix experience". In the opinion of The Daily Telegraph's Jamie Dickson, the compilation shows why "his status as rock's most outrageously inspired guitarist has endured", while contrasting "the opulence of his studio epics with the fluency and fire of his live performances nicely".

Nicholas Taylor from PopMatters was more reserved in his praise, feeling the alternate versions on disc one are of mixed quality but that the two-disc set still offers listeners the most thorough overview of Hendrix's precarious artistry, particularly the live disc. "We hear him at his glorious studio best, we hear his less than stellar studio experimentation, and we hear his sometimes wildly exhilarating, sometimes horribly messy, live performances", Taylor wrote, concluding that Voodoo Child "gives us a full picture of Jimi Hendrix—always experimenting, always pushing the limits of conventional guitar rock, always willing to put it all out there at the risk of looking like a fool."

== Track listing ==
The titles and running times are taken from the original Voodoo Child CD release. Other releases may show different information.

All tracks are written by Jimi Hendrix, except where noted.

Disc one (studio)
| No. | Title | Original release | Length |
|---|---|---|---|
| 1. | "Purple Haze" | single | 2:50 |
| 2. | "Hey Joe" (Billy Roberts) | single | 3:30 |
| 3. | "The Wind Cries Mary" | single | 3:20 |
| 4. | "Fire" | Are You Experienced | 2:43 |
| 5. | "Highway Chile" | alternate recording | 3:39 |
| 6. | "Are You Experienced?" | Are You Experienced | 3:35 |
| 7. | "Burning of the Midnight Lamp" | single (UK), Electric Ladyland | 3:39 |
| 8. | "Little Wing" | Axis: Bold as Love | 2:24 |
| 9. | "All Along the Watchtower" (Bob Dylan) | alternate recording; Electric Ladyland | 3:59 |
| 10. | "Crosstown Traffic" | Electric Ladyland | 2:12 |
| 11. | "Voodoo Child (Slight Return)" | Electric Ladyland | 5:12 |
| 12. | "Spanish Castle Magic" | alternate recording | 5:48 |
| 13. | "Stone Free" | alternate recording | 3:43 |
| 14. | "Izabella" | single (US) | 2:46 |
| 15. | "Stepping Stone" | single (US) | 4:07 |
| 16. | "Angel" | The Cry of Love | 4:21 |
| 17. | "Dolly Dagger" | Rainbow Bridge | 4:44 |
| 18. | "Hey Baby (New Rising Sun)" | Rainbow Bridge | 6:04 |
| 19. | "Third Stone from the Sun" (UK bonus track) | Are You Experienced | 6:45 |

Disc two (live)
| No. | Title | Other release(s) | Length |
|---|---|---|---|
| 1. | "Fire" | Winterland | 3:33 |
| 2. | "Hey Joe" (Billy Roberts) | Winterland | 6:46 |
| 3. | "I Don't Live Today" | Los Angeles Forum: April 26, 1969 | 6:45 |
| 4. | "Hear My Train A Comin'" | Rainbow Bridge (album); Blues | 11:00 |
| 5. | "Foxey Lady" | Rainbow Bridge (film); Live in Maui | 4:25 |
| 6. | "Machine Gun" | Live at the Fillmore East; Songs for Groovy Children: The Fillmore East Concerts | 11:36 |
| 7. | "Johnny B. Goode" (Chuck Berry) | Hendrix in the West | 4:45 |
| 8. | "Red House" | The Jimi Hendrix Concerts | 8:00 |
| 9. | "Freedom" | Blue Wild Angel: Live at the Isle of Wight | 4:06 |
| 10. | "Purple Haze" | Stages – Disc three | 3:55 |
| 11. | "The Star-Spangled Banner" (music composed by John Stafford Smith) | Live at Woodstock | 3:43 |
| 12. | "Wild Thing" (Chip Taylor) | Live at Monterey | 7:41 |

== Charts ==
- US Billboard 200: number 112
- UK Albums Chart: number 10
