= Stone Free =

Single by the Jimi Hendrix Experience

from the album Smash Hits
- A-side: "Hey Joe" (UK)
- B-side: "If 6 Was 9" (US)
- Released: December 16, 1966 (UK); September 15, 1969 (US)
- Recorded: November 2, 1966
- Studio: De Lane Lea, London
- Genre: Psychedelic rock
- Length: 3:36
- Label: Polydor (UK); Reprise (US)
- Songwriter: Jimi Hendrix
- Producer: Chas Chandler

Experience UK singles chronology
"Stone Free" (1966)	"The Wind Cries Mary" (1967)

Jimi Hendrix US singles chronology
"Crosstown Traffic" (1968)	"Stone Free" (1969)	"Stepping Stone" (1970)

"Stone Free" is a song written by Jimi Hendrix and the second song recorded by the Jimi Hendrix Experience. It has been described as a "counterculture anthem, with its lyrics praising the footloose and fancy-free life", which reflected Hendrix's restless lifestyle. Instrumentally, the song has a strong rhythmic drive provided by drummer Mitch Mitchell with harmonic support by bassist Noel Redding. "Stone Free" was issued on December 16, 1966, as the B-side of the Experience's first UK single "Hey Joe" and later included on the Smash Hits compilation album.

In April 1969, Hendrix recorded a revised rendition of the song for possible release as a single. However, it was not used and Reprise Records issued the original recording as a single in the U.S. on September 15, 1969. Hendrix often played "Stone Free" in concert using extended arrangements, sometimes lasting over fourteen minutes. The revised song and several live recordings were later released.

== Recording and composition ==
With the first Experience song, "Hey Joe", completed on October 23, 1966, the group needed a second number for their debut single. Hendrix suggested another cover song, but producer Chas Chandler encouraged him to come up with an original in order to receive song publishing royalties. Hendrix wrote "Stone Free", his first Experience composition on October 24 after a jam at a London club. ("Look Over Yonder", recorded by the Experience in 1968, began in 1966 as "Mr. Bad Luck", written and performed by Hendrix with his band Jimmy James and the Blue Flames in Greenwich Village, New York). The group rehearsed the song, with Chandler (formerly a bassist with the Animals) showing Redding, a guitarist who was new to the bass, some bass lines. "Stone Free" was recorded at De Lane Lea Studios in London on November 2, 1966. According to Chandler, it was completed in an hour. Overdubbing was minimal, consisting of a cowbell part by Mitchell and an additional guitar line and harmony vocals by Hendrix.

Hendrix's vocal for "Stone Free" has been compared to that for "Hey Joe". Biographer Keith Shadwick describes it as "an almost conversational delivery ... toying with blues intervals in a way that John Lee Hooker would build a blues phrase rather than delivering any defined melodic pattern." The lyrics reflect Hendrix's lifestyle, as he explained in an interview: "I stay one or two months in a place and then I must have a change ... I just get so restless, man—I might leave right away":

Every day in the week I'm in a different city
If I stay too long the people try to pull me down
They talk about me like a dog, talkin' about the clothes I wear
They don't realize they're the ones who's square

The lyrics also express his feelings of resentment when he returned to Harlem after exploring the counterculture Greenwich Village:

I used to go to the [Harlem] clubs, and my hair was really long then. Sometimes I'd tie it up or do something with it and the cats would say, 'Ah, look at that: Black Jesus.' Even in your own section [of town]. I had friends with me in Harlem, 125th Street, and all of a sudden, cats, old ladies, girls, anybody would say, 'Ooh, look at that. What is this, a circus or something?'

"Stone Free" is an uptempo song which has a strong rhythmic element, due in large part to Mitchell's jazz-influenced drumming approach. Although he "constantly underlines Hendrix's vocals and guitar parts in a dramatic fashion [with] fills and changes of rhythmic emphases", Mitchell continues to "stress the snare beat" and adds quarter-notes on the cowbell. Redding's bass line provides harmonic support similar to a rhythm guitar and has been compared to "Philly Dog", a Mar-Keys song. The verse section is a variation on a blues progression, which uses the beginning eight bars of a twelve-bar blues. The song opens with Hendrix plucking harmonic notes and unlike most of his songs, he uses a standard tuning for the guitar. Guitarist Jeff Beck, who considered "Stone Free" his favourite Hendrix song, commented, "It's got bits of Buddy Guy; it sounds like Les Paul in places. Jimi does every trick in the book and nails it all together so tight that you can't even see the joints."

== Releases ==
"Stone Free" was released as the B-side of "Hey Joe" on December 16, 1966. Although the group was signed to Track Records in the UK, the label was not fully operational, so the single appeared on Polydor Records. In order to ensure the single's success, Hendrix's manager, Michael Jeffery, signed over a portion of the publishing rights to "Stone Free" as an inducement for radio airplay (since "Hey Joe" was already published, it was unavailable for such an arrangement). Hendrix's publisher, Abby Schroeder, was reportedly "livid". He recalled

Jeffery was so desperate for airplay that he allowed himself to be blackmailed. He explained to me that this process had worked successfully once before and, to ensure heavy pirate [radio] airplay, one had to give up a piece of the action. I told him that splitting publishing copyrights wasn't like cutting up a pie. There were other ways to get airplay without sacrificing your artist's work.

The single became a success and reached number six on the UK Singles Chart. It was later included on the Experience's first compilation album Smash Hits.

When "Hey Joe" was issued in the U.S., Reprise Records included "51st Anniversary" as the B-side. "Stone Free" was included on the American Smash Hits album, which was released on July 30, 1969. Almost two months later, it was released as the A-side of a single with "If 6 Was 9". The single missed the Billboard Hot 100 pop chart, but made an appearance at number 130 on the magazine's Bubbling Under Hot 100 Singles chart. The song is included on several later Hendrix compilations, including Stone Free, The Singles Album, Experience Hendrix: The Best of Jimi Hendrix, and The Singles Collection.

In April 1969, the Experience recorded a remake of "Stone Free" with some additional musicians. Since the song had not been released in the U.S. by that time, Hendrix was considering it for his next single. Roger Chapman from Family and Andy Fairweather Low from Amen Corner (two British groups the Experience had toured with) provided background vocals. Hendrix biographer and later producer John McDermott describes the new version as having a "more sophisticated arrangement" and Shadwick calls it "disciplined but spiritless". Reprise Records later issued the original "Stone Free" and the remake was first released on the Alan Douglas-produced Crash Landing album in 1975. Douglas erased the original multitrack recordings and used new backing musicians; however, unlike most of the other songs on the album, Douglas did not take a song writing credit for the new version. The 1969 version was later restored and included on The Jimi Hendrix Experience and Voodoo Child: The Jimi Hendrix Collection. A variation with Billy Cox on bass is included on the West Coast Seattle Boy: The Jimi Hendrix Anthology.

A 1993 cover of the song by Eric Clapton from the album Stone Free: A Tribute to Jimi Hendrix reached #43 in the Canadian RPM charts.

== Live recordings ==
"Stone Free" was frequently performed by Hendrix and live recordings with the Experience, Band of Gypsys, and the Cry of Love touring group have been released on albums. Early versions follow the original version, while later ones sometimes extend for over fourteen minutes with improvised guitar and drum solos. Some of these include:

- 1967 Saturday Club, London – BBC Sessions (3:25)
- 1967 Olympia Theatre, Paris – Paris 1967/San Francisco 1968 (3:12)
- 1969 Royal Albert Hall, London – The Jimi Hendrix Concerts (10:32)
- 1969 Fillmore East, New York (2nd show) – West Coast Seattle Boy: The Jimi Hendrix Anthology (14:46)
- 1970 Fillmore East, New York (4th show) – Live at the Fillmore East (12:56)
- 1970 Berkeley Community Theatre, Berkeley, California – Live at Berkeley (4:08)
- 1970 Atlanta International Pop Festival, Byron, Georgia – Stages (5:25)
