= Jimi Hendrix: An Illustrated Experience =

2007 biography by Janie Hendrix and John McDermott

- Author: Janie Hendrix; John McDermott
- Cover artist: Kasey Free
- Language: English
- Subject: Jimi Hendrix
- Publisher: Simon & Schuster
- Publication date: October 9, 2007
- Publication place: United States
- Media type: Print (Hardcover)
- Pages: 64
- ISBN: 978-0-7432-9769-1
- OCLC: 144525031
- LC Class: ML410.H476 H49 2007

Jimi Hendrix: An Illustrated Experience is a biography of American guitarist Jimi Hendrix, written by his stepsister Janie and his biographer John McDermott, and published on October 9, 2007. The book tells the story of Hendrix and his life through reproductions of rare material such as letters, drawings, postcards and posters. An Illustrated Experience also contains a companion CD entitled Hendrix: Live, which includes three live tracks, two interviews, and a studio jam entitled "Keep on Groovin'".

== Overview ==
The focus of An Illustrated Experience is on the interactive features used to tell Hendrix's life story. Authors Janie Hendrix and John McDermott both work for Experience Hendrix, L.L.C., the exclusive copyright holder to all Hendrix material, and so had exclusive access to the family archives when compiling the book, allowing them to reproduce rare first-hand Hendrix memorabilia such as handwritten lyrics, drawings and postcards, from various periods throughout his life. The companion CD also aims to give an insight into the musician's life as it includes a studio jam running for over twenty minutes, featuring many unsorted parts of future songs.

== Chapters ==
1. West Coast Seattle Boy
  - Jimi's early life and childhood.
2. Screamin' Eagle
  - Jimi's life in the army, including his time with The King Kasuals.
3. Sideman
  - Jimi's early career with such acts as Little Richard, Curtis Knight and The Blue Flames.
4. The Experience
  - The formation of The Jimi Hendrix Experience and their first LP, Are You Experienced.
5. Wild Thing
  - Monterey Pop Festival and the release of Axis: Bold as Love.
6. Electric Ladyland
  - The writing, recording, release and promotion of Electric Ladyland.
7. Seeds of Change
  - The breakup of The Experience and the introduction of more musicians for Gypsy Sun and Rainbows.
8. Woodstock
  - Woodstock Festival and the formation of the Band of Gypsys.
9. Cry of Love
  - The Cry of Love Tour and work on First Rays of the New Rising Sun.
10. The Last Days
  - Jimi's last few days alive and his untimely death.

== Hendrix: Live ==
Hendrix: Live consists mainly of material from The Jimi Hendrix Experience's concert at Clark University on March 15, 1968; namely the performances of "Fire", "Red House" and "Foxy Lady", as well as the pre- and post-concert interviews. The final track on the disc is a jam session from Record Plant Studios in November 1969 entitled "Keep on Groovin'", which featured Hendrix and drummer Buddy Miles laying down the groundwork for some of the many songs they were working on, including "Power of Soul", "Burning Desire" and "Stepping Stone". This recording was previously issued as part of 2000's Morning Symphony Ideas.

=== Track listing ===
All songs were written by Jimi Hendrix.

- Live at Clark University, March 15, 1968
  1. Backstage Pre-Concert Interview – 20:58
  2. "Fire" – 3:36
  3. "Red House" – 7:12
  4. "Foxey Lady" – 4:35
  5. Backstage Post-Concert Interview – 4:56
- Studio recording at Record Plant Studios, November 1969
  6. "Keep On Groovin'" – 28:06

=== Credits ===
- Jimi Hendrix – guitars, vocals
- Noel Redding – bass on tracks 2, 3 and 4, backing vocals on track 2
- Mitch Mitchell – drums on tracks 2, 3 and 4
- Buddy Miles – drums on track 6
- Producers: Janie Hendrix, Eddie Kramer, John McDermott
