= Angel (Jimi Hendrix song) =

- German single picture sleeve

Single by Jimi Hendrix

from the album The Cry of Love
- A-side: "Freedom" (US)
- B-side: "Night Bird Flying" (UK)
- Released: March 8, 1971 (US); 1971 (UK)
- Recorded: July–August 1970; October 1970 (Mitchell drum overdub)
- Studio: Electric Lady, New York City
- Genre: Rock
- Length: 4:25
- Label: Reprise (US); Track (UK)
- Songwriter: Jimi Hendrix
- Producers: Jimi Hendrix; Mitch Mitchell; Eddie Kramer

"Angel" (also titled "Sweet Angel") is a song by American rock musician Jimi Hendrix, featured on his 1971 posthumous studio album The Cry of Love. Written and self-produced by Hendrix, he recorded it for his planned fourth studio album just months before he died in September 1970.

In 1971, "Angel" was included on the first posthumously-released Hendrix album, The Cry of Love. The same year, the song was also released as a single A-side in the United Kingdom and as a B-side in the United States.

== Background and recording ==
Despite its late entry into his catalog, the song "Angel" dates back to relatively early in Hendrix's career. In October 1967, he and drummer Mitch Mitchell first recorded it with the title "Little Wing" in a session at Olympic Studios in London. Later in the year the song took on its own identity, with an initial demo recorded solo as "Sweet Angel" on November 13, 1967 at Olympic. It was later released on South Saturn Delta (1997). On December 28, 1967, Hendrix recorded overdubs for his earlier demo; this version is included on The Jimi Hendrix Experience box set (2000).

By January 14, 1968, Hendrix finished writing the lyrics, as indicated in his handwritten notes with an instrumental demo from that same day that was included on Both Sides of the Sky (2018). For the title, he used "My Angel Catherina (Return of Little Wing)", thus connecting it to the "Little Wing" he recorded in October 1967 for Axis: Bold as Love. According to sessionographers Gary Geldeart and Steve Rodham, Hendrix made a private recording of "Angel" at a New York apartment in March 1968. In 1995, the apartment recordings were released on a companion disc to the book Voodoo Child: The Illustrated Legend of Jimi Hendrix.

After delaying progress on the song for over two years, Hendrix returned to work on "Angel" with Mitchell and bassist Billy Cox in July 1970, during sessions for his planned fourth studio album. The master recording was produced at Electric Lady Studios on July 23, the last of seven takes. Overdubbing and mixing were completed on August 20 and Mitch Mitchell added further drum overdubs on October 19, 1970. As with the majority of material recorded during this period, "Angel" was produced by Hendrix and engineered by Eddie Kramer.

== Composition and lyrics ==
Jimi Hendrix wrote "Angel" in reference to a dream he had about his mother, Lucille Hendrix née Jeter, when he was a child; speaking in a December 1967 interview conducted by Meatball Fulton, Hendrix explained the inspiration behind the song by describing the dream as follows:

My mother was bein' carried away on this camel. And there was a big caravan, she's sayin', 'Well, I'm gonna see you now,' and she's goin' under these trees, you could see the shade, you know, the leaf patterns across her face when she was goin' under ... She's sayin', 'Well, I won't be seein' you too much anymore, you know. I'll see you.' And then about two years after that she dies, you know. And I said, 'Yeah, but where are you goin'?' and all that, you know. I remember that. I will always remember that. I never did forget ... there are some dreams you never forget.

In the biography Jimi Hendrix: Electric Gypsy, Hendrix historians Harry Shapiro and Caesar Glebbeek have compared "Angel" – which they describe as "arguably Jimi's finest ballad" – with fellow The Cry of Love track "Night Bird Flying", citing similarities in their lyrics as evidence of the more personal subject matter explored by the musician in his later career. The song has also been likened lyrically to "May This Be Love" (from Are You Experienced) and "Long Hot Summer Night" (from Electric Ladyland), in which Shapiro and Glebbeek feel that Hendrix is seeking a "mystical woman ... as his only means of inner peace and personal salvation".

== Release and reception ==
Following Hendrix's death in September 1970, "Angel" was among the ten songs selected by Mitch Mitchell and Eddie Kramer for inclusion on the first posthumous studio album, The Cry of Love, released in March 1971. In the same month, the song was released as a single in Europe, and it was also included as the B-side to the "Freedom" single released in North America. In 1995, the track appeared on the controversial Alan Douglas-produced Voodoo Soup album, and in 1997, it was featured on the first new release by the family-run Experience Hendrix, First Rays of the New Rising Sun.

"Angel" is generally considered an important song in Hendrix's back catalogue. In a four-star review of The Cry of Love for AllMusic, critic Sean Westergaard identified the track, in addition to "Ezy Ryder", as one of the main highlights of the album, while critic Robert Christgau praised it, along with "Night Bird Flying", as an "offhand rhapsody". The song is included on several Hendrix compilation albums, including The Ultimate Experience (1992), Experience Hendrix: The Best of Jimi Hendrix (1997), and Voodoo Child: The Jimi Hendrix Collection (2001).

== Cover versions ==
"Angel" has been recorded by a number of artists over the years. Rod Stewart included the song on his 1972 album, Never a Dull Moment which is the first commercially-released version after Hendrix. Stephen Thomas Erlewine of AllMusic describes it as a "soulful reading of the original". The song was also released as a single, which reached number four on the UK Singles Chart, number 40 on the US Billboard Hot 100 chart, and number 47 in Canada. Stewart with the Faces recorded a live performance of "Angel", which appears on Coast to Coast: Overture and Beginners (1974).

Also, in 1972, the British blues-rock band Vinegar Joe covered the song on their album Rock'n Roll Gypsies, featuring Elkie Brooks on lead vocals and released several months after Stewart.

In 1995, Jeff Healey recorded "Angel" for the album Cover to Cover. Lulu recorded a Rod Stewart-influenced version for her album, Making Life Rhyme (2015).

== Sources ==
- Geldeart, Gary; Rodham, Steve (2007). Jimi Hendrix: The Studio Log. Warrington, UK: Jimpress.
- Hendrix, Janie (2003). Jimi Hendrix: The Lyrics. Milwaukee, Wisconsin: Hal Leonard. ISBN 0-634-04930-5.
- Hendrix, Janie; McDermott, John (2007). Jimi Hendrix: An Illustrated Experience. London: Simon & Schuster.
- McDermott, John (1997a). First Rays of the New Rising Sun (liner notes). Jimi Hendrix. Universal City, California: MCA Records. MCAD-11236.
- McDermott, John (1997b). South Saturn Delta (CD booklet). Jimi Hendrix. Universal City, California: Experience Hendrix/MCA Records. MCA2-11684.
- McDermott, John (2000). The Jimi Hendrix Experience (Box set booklet). Jimi Hendrix Experience. Santa Monica, California: MCA Records. 088 112 316-2.
- Shapiro, Harry; Glebbeek, Caesar (1995). Jimi Hendrix: Electric Gypsy. New York City: St. Martin's Press. ISBN 9780312130626.
