= First Rays of the New Rising Sun =

1997 album by Jimi Hendrix

Compilation album by Jimi Hendrix
- Released: May 1, 1997
- Recorded: March 13, 1968 ("My Friend"); December 18, 1969 – August 24, 1970
- Genre: Rock
- Length: 69:27
- Label: MCA, Experience Hendrix
- Producer: Jimi Hendrix; Eddie Kramer; Mitch Mitchell; John Jansen

Jimi Hendrix chronology
Voodoo Soup (1995)	First Rays of the New Rising Sun (1997)	Experience Hendrix: The Best of Jimi Hendrix (1997)

First Rays of the New Rising Sun is a compilation album credited to American rock musician Jimi Hendrix, issued on 1st May 1997 on MCA Records. Featuring songs mostly intended for his planned fourth studio album, it was one of the first releases overseen by Experience Hendrix, the family company that took over management of his recording legacy. It reached the album charts in the United States, United Kingdom, and four other countries.

Hendrix recorded most of the songs at his new Electric Lady Studios in New York City with former Jimi Hendrix Experience drummer Mitch Mitchell and Band of Gypsys bassist Billy Cox, his regular backing for the final six months. All of the songs had been released previously on Hendrix's first posthumous albums The Cry of Love, Rainbow Bridge, and War Heroes; Cry of Love appears here in its entirety but within a different running order. First Rays of the New Rising Sun superseded Voodoo Soup, the 1995 attempt by controversial interim Hendrix producer Alan Douglas, to realize Hendrix's fourth album.

== Background ==
At the time of his death in 1970, Hendrix was working on enough songs for a double album, with one proposed title First Rays of the New Rising Sun. The tracks were in varying stages of development, with only about six believed to be near completion. Long-time Hendrix recording engineer Eddie Kramer and drummer Mitchell selected 17 of what they felt were the best tracks, which were first released on The Cry of Love, Rainbow Bridge, and War Heroes. From the 1970s through the 1990s, the songs also appeared on other posthumous compilations supervised by producer Alan Douglas, who wiped bass and drums performances by Mitchell, Cox and Miles and overdubbed them with parts newly recorded by session musicians. He also added female backing singers to one track, and claimed co-composer credit on several tracks. For the 1997 compilation, Kramer instead used the original master recordings and sequenced the songs to realize Hendrix's plans to the best of his abilities. He selected tracks based on their original level of completion and Hendrix's personal notes.

According to Richie Unterberger in his Rough Guide to Jimi Hendrix (2009), "Some Hendrix fans might take issue with First Rays of the New Rising Sun being classified as a compilation, rather than as a studio album, consisting as it does solely of studio recordings, most of them cut and/or polished shortly before his death in September 1970 ... Yet when all is said and done, [it] is not what Hendrix would have issued as his fourth album. No such record could be posthumously compiled, as nobody knows with absolute certainty what songs he would have included, and what additional production work he might have done on the ones he had laid down in the studio, no matter how complete they might have seemed to others."

Several additional songs that appeared on Hendrix's proposed track listings for his fourth studio album were later released by Experience Hendrix: "Valleys of Neptune", "Cherokee Mist", "Bleeding Heart", "Hear My Train A Comin'" (also known as "Getting My Heart Back Together Again"), "Lover Man", "Midnight Lightning" (demo), and "Send My Love to Linda". Another three, "Come Down Hard on Me Baby", "The Drifter's Escape", and "Burning Desire", were issued on Loose Ends (1974).

== Release and reception ==
Professional ratings
Review scores
Source	Rating
AllMusic	4/5 stars
Blender	4/5 stars
DownBeat	4/5 stars
The Encyclopedia of Popular Music	3/5 stars
Los Angeles Times	4/4 stars
PopMatters	9/10
The Rolling Stone Album Guide	4/5 stars
Tom Hull – on the Web	A−
Uncut	5/5 stars

When First Rays of the New Rising Sun was released in 1997, it charted at number 49 on the Billboard 200 in the United States, and at number 37 on the UK Albums Charts in Britain. In 2010, the album was remastered and re-released by Sony Legacy and included a DVD with a mini-documentary titled An Inside Look: First Rays of the New Rising Sun.

According to Robert Christgau in Blender, First Rays of the New Rising Sun was Kramer's reimagination of Hendrix's projected double LP, which was not as remarkable musically as his last studio album Electric Ladyland (1968) and "not too profound lyrically". Nonetheless, Christgau deemed it a suitable successor to The Cry of Love, as well as "a powerful collection by a genius whose songwriting kept growing and whose solos rarely disappoint." Sean Murphy from PopMatters believed it was more successful than The Cry of Love in realizing Hendrix's vision. He highlighted the "liberating presence" of bassist Billy Cox, deeming him an improvement over Noel Redding. According to Murphy, Cox allowed the band to "spread out and chase the guitarist as he soars above, around and beneath them". Rolling Stone called the album "a cohesive cosmic missive", writing that it "illuminates what would have been a transitional phase for Hendrix".

== Track listing ==
Details are taken from the liner notes to the original MCA CD and may differ from other sources.

All tracks are written by Jimi Hendrix (Note: The instrumental was titled "Beginning", with Mitch Mitchell listed as the songwriter, on the original 1971 Reprise Records album War Heroes.)

No.	Title	Original release	Length
1.	"Freedom"	The Cry of Love	3:26
2.	"Izabella"	War Heroes	2:50
3.	"Night Bird Flying"	The Cry of Love	3:50
4.	"Angel"	The Cry of Love	4:21
5.	"Room Full of Mirrors"	Rainbow Bridge	3:21
6.	"Dolly Dagger"	Rainbow Bridge	4:44
7.	"Ezy Ryder"	The Cry of Love	4:07
8.	"Drifting"	The Cry of Love	3:48
9.	"Beginnings"	War Heroes	4:12
10.	"Stepping Stone"	War Heroes	4:12
11.	"My Friend"	The Cry of Love	4:36
12.	"Straight Ahead"	The Cry of Love	4:42
13.	"Hey Baby (New Rising Sun)"	Rainbow Bridge	6:04
14.	"Earth Blues"	Rainbow Bridge	4:21
15.	"Astro Man"	The Cry of Love	3:34
16.	"In From the Storm"	The Cry of Love	3:41
17.	"Belly Button Window"	The Cry of Love	3:36
Total length:			69:27

== Recording details ==
List of songs with recording dates and studios
Song	Recording date(s) / studio(s) (All in 1970 at Electric Lady Studios in New York City, except as noted)
"Freedom"	June 25, July 14 & 19, August 14 & 20
"Izabella"	January 17 at Record Plant, New York City
"Izabella"	June (overdubs) at Electric Lady
"Night Bird Flying"	June 16, July 19, August 22
"Angel"	July 23
"Angel"	October 19 (drums overdub)
"Room Full of Mirrors"	November 17, 1969, at Record Plant
"Room Full of Mirrors"	June, July, August 20 (overdubs) at Electric Lady
"Dolly Dagger"	July 1, 15, 19, 20; August 14, 18, 20, 24
"Ezy Ryder"	December 18, 1969; January 20 at Record Plant
"Ezy Ryder"	June 15 & 18, July 2, August 22 (overdubs) at Electric Lady
"Drifting"	June 25 & 29, July 23, August 20
"Drifting"	November 20 (vibes overdub)
"Beginnings"	July 1, August 22
"Stepping Stone"	January 7, 17, 20 at Record Plant
"Stepping Stone"	June 26 (overdubs) at Electric Lady
"My Friend"	March 13, 1968, at Sound Center, New York City
"Straight Ahead"	June 17, July 19, August 20
"Hey Baby (New Rising Sun)"	July 1
"Earth Blues"	December 19, 1969, at Record Plant
"Earth Blues"	January 20 (overdubs) at Record Plant; June 26 (overdubs) at Electric Lady
"Astro Man"	June 25, July 19, August 22
"In From the Storm"	July 22, August 20 & 24
"Belly Button Window"	August 22

== Personnel ==
From the original MCA Records First Rays of the New Rising Sun CD booklet:

Band members

- Jimi Hendrix – lead vocals, guitar, bass guitar on "My Friend", backing vocals on "Earth Blues" and "In from the Storm", production, mixing on "Freedom", "Nightbird Flying", "Dolly Dagger", "Room Full of Mirrors", "Ezy Ryder"
- Billy Cox – bass guitar (except "My Friend" and "Belly Button Window"), backing vocals on "Earth Blues" and "In from the Storm"
- Mitch Mitchell – drums on all tracks (except "Room Full of Mirrors" and "Ezy Ryder"), production (except "Izabella", "Beginnings", "Stepping Stone"), mixing on "Angel"

Additional musicians

- Albert and Arthur Allen (the Ghetto Fighters) – backing vocals on "Freedom", "Izabella", "Dolly Dagger", and "Stepping Stone"
- The Ronettes (Veronica Bennett, Estelle Bennett, Nedra Talley) – backing vocals on "Earth Blues"
- Juma Sultan – percussion on "Freedom", "Dolly Dagger", "Beginnings", "Hey Baby (The New Rising Sun)", "Earth Blues", "Astro Man"
- Buddy Miles – drums on "Room Full of Mirrors" and "Ezy Ryder", backing vocals on "Earth Blues"
- Billy Armstrong – percussion on "Ezy Rider"
- Buzzy Linhart – vibraphone on "Drifting"
- Emmeretta Marks – backing vocals on "In from the Storm"
- Steve Winwood – backing vocals on "Ezy Ryder"
- Chris Wood – backing vocals on "Ezy Ryder"
- Kenny Pine – twelve-string guitar on "My Friend"
- Jimmy Mayes – drums on "My Friend"
- Stephen Stills – piano on "My Friend"
- Paul Caruso – harmonica on "My Friend"

Additional personnel

- Eddie Kramer – producer, engineering, mixing, photography, remastering
- John Jansen – production on "Izabella", "Room Full of Mirrors", "Dolly Dagger", "Beginnings", "Stepping Stone", "Hey Baby (New Rising Sun)", "Earth Blues"; mixing on "Izabella", "Beginnings", "Stepping Stone", "Hey Baby (New Rising Sun)", "Earth Blues"
- Tony Bongiovi – engineering on "Room Full of Mirrors"
- Jack Abrams – engineering on "Ezy Ryder" (1969)
- Bob Hughes – engineering on "Ezy Ryder" (1970), "Earth Blues" (1970)
- Bob Cotto – engineering on "Earth Blues" (1969)
- John McDermott – liner notes, remastering supervisor

== Charts ==
Chart performance for First Rays of the New Rising Sun
Chart (1997)	Peak position
Finnish Albums (Suomen virallinen lista)	24
German Albums (Offizielle Top 100)	90
New Zealand Albums (RMNZ)	27
Swedish Albums (Sverigetopplistan)	46
UK Albums (OCC)	37
US Billboard 200	49
