= Martin Scorsese Presents the Blues: Jimi Hendrix =

Compilation album by Jimi Hendrix
- Released: September 9, 2003
- Recorded: 13 December 1966 – 23 March 1970
- Genre: Blues, blues rock
- Length: 75:02
- Label: MCA
- Producer: Janie Hendrix, John McDermott, Eddie Kramer

Jimi Hendrix chronology
Paris 1967/San Francisco 1968 (2003)	Martin Scorsese Presents the Blues: Jimi Hendrix (2003)	Live at Berkeley (2003)

Professional ratings
Review scores
Source	Rating
AllMusic	3/5 stars
PopMatters	4.5/5 stars

Martin Scorsese Presents the Blues: Jimi Hendrix is a ten track companion release to the critically acclaimed television documentary series Martin Scorsese Presents The Blues shown on PBS in September 2003.

The album features two previously unreleased blues inspired performances. "Georgia Blues" (recorded on March 19, 1969, at New York's Record Plant Studios) was recorded with saxophonist Lonnie Youngblood, with whom Hendrix played some early sessions in 1966. Also previously unreleased is "Blue Window", recorded in March 1969 at Mercury Studios in New York. This track features Buddy Miles Express members: Buddy Miles on drums, Duane Hitchings on organ, Bill Rich on bass guitar and brass players Tobie Wynn, James Tatum, Bobby Rock, Pete Carter, and Tom Hall (now known as Khalil Shaheed).

== Track listing ==
1. "Red House" – 3:50
2. "Voodoo Chile" – 15:00
3. "Come On (Let the Good Times Roll)" – 4:09
4. "Georgia Blues" – 7:57
5. "Country Blues" – 8:26
6. "Hear My Train A Comin'" – 6:57
7. "It's Too Bad" – 8:52
8. "My Friend" – 4:36
9. "Blue Window" – 12:51
10. "Midnight Lightning" – 3:06

== Recording details ==
- Track 1 recorded in London at CBS Studios on Dec. 13, 1966; De Lane Lea Studios on Feb. 1967; Olympic Studios in Apr. 1967
- Track 2 recorded at Record Plant in New York City on May 2, 1968
- Track 3 recorded at Record Plant in New York City on Aug. 27, 1968
- Track 4 recorded at Record Plant in New York City on Mar. 19, 1969
- Track 5 recorded at Record Plant in New York City on Jan. 23, 1970
- Track 6 recorded at Olympic Studios in London on Feb. 17, 1969
- Track 7 recorded at Record Plant in New York City on Feb. 11, 1969
- Track 8 recorded at Sound Center in New York City on Mar. 13, 1968
- Track 9 recorded at Mercury Studios in New York City in Mar. 1969
- Track 10 recorded at Record Plant in New York City on Mar. 23, 1970

== Personnel ==
- Jimi Hendrix – guitar, vocals
- Mitch Mitchell, Jimmy Mayes, Buddy Miles – drums
- Noel Redding, Jack Casady, Hank Anderson, Billy Cox, Bill Rich – bass
- Lonnie Youngblood – vocals, saxophone
- Ken Pine – 12-string guitar
- Paul Caruso – harmonica
- Bobby Rock – tenor saxophone
- Tobie Wynn – baritone saxophone
- Tom Hall (Khalil Shaheed), Pete Carter – trumpet
- Stephen Stills – piano
- Steve Winwood – organ
- Duane Hitchings – organ
- John Winfield – organ
