= Juma Sultan =

American jazz musician (born 1942)

Juma Sultan (born April 13, 1942) is a jazz musician, most often recording as a percussionist or bass player. He may be best known for his appearance at the Woodstock festival of 1969 at Bethel, New York, playing with Jimi Hendrix. He currently plays in the African performance group Sankofa, the band Sons of Thunder, and with the Juma Sultan Band.

== Career ==
Sultan was born in Monrovia, California on April 13, 1942. In 1969, he performed at the Woodstock festival in Hendrix's band, Gypsy Sun and Rainbows and on The Dick Cavett Show and at a special show in Harlem, New York several weeks later. He was interviewed extensively for the documentary films, Jimi Hendrix and Jimi Hendrix: Live at Woodstock. He appears on approximately 12 of Jimi Hendrix' posthumous releases.

Juma Sultan's musical talents span jazz, rock, blues and spirituals throughout decades of performing, producing and recording. In 2006, Clarkson University, in conjunction with Sultan, received a grant from the National Endowment of the Arts to preserve Sultan's audio and video documentation of avant garde jazz during the 1960s and 1970s. The collection may be viewed at www.jumasarchive.org.

Sultan appeared at the National Rock Con from July 30, 2010 – August 1, 2010.

Sultan also joined Vince Martell, Spanky and Our Gang, and Bleu Ocean at B.B. King's Blues Club on August 2, 2010, for the encore of "California Dreamin'".

Juma also recorded with Archie Shepp, Noah Howard, Kalaparusha Maurice McIntyre, Sonny Simmons, Daoud Haroon, Asha Nan, Emmeretta Marks, Don Moore Band, and Sankofa.

== Discography ==
=== As leader or co-leader ===
With Juma Sultan's Aboriginal Music Society

- Father of Origin (Eremite, 2011)
- Whispers from the Archive (Porter, 2012)

=== As sideman ===
With Sam Amidon

- The Following Mountain (Nonesuch, 2017)

With the Earl Cross Sextet

- Jazz of the Seventies: Sam Rivers Tuba Trio & Earl Cross Sextet (Circle, 1977)

With Alan Glover

- The Juice Quartet Archives Volumes 1, 2, 3 (Omolade, 2010)

With Jimi Hendrix

- The Cry of Love (Reprise, 1971)
- Rainbow Bridge (Reprise, 1971)
- Soundtrack Recordings from the Film Jimi Hendrix (Reprise, 1973)
- Crash Landing (Reprise, 1975)
- Woodstock (MCA, 1994)
- Voodoo Soup (MCA, 1995)
- First Rays of the New Rising Sun (MCA, 1997)
- South Saturn Delta (MCA, 1997)
- Live at Woodstock (MCA, 1999; deluxe edition 2010)
- The Jimi Hendrix Experience (MCA, 2000)
- Valleys of Neptune (Legacy, 2010)
- West Coast Seattle Boy: The Jimi Hendrix Anthology (Legacy, 2010)
- People, Hell and Angels (Legacy, 2013)

With Noah Howard

- The Black Ark (Freedom, 1972)
- Live at the Village Vanguard (Freedom, 1975)

With Kalaparusha Maurice McIntyre

- Kwanza (Baystate, 1978)

With Joe McPhee, Michael Bisio, and Fred Lonberg-Holm

- The Sweet Spot (RogueArt, 2021)

With Archie Shepp

- Things Have Got to Change (Impulse!, 1971)
- Attica Blues (Impulse!, 1972)

With Sonny Simmons

- Manhattan Egos (Arhoolie, 1969)

== Selected filmography/videography ==
1. Jimi Hendrix: The Dick Cavett Show (1969)
2. Woodstock (1970)
3. Jimi Hendrix at Woodstock (1992)
4. Jimi Hendrix: Live at Woodstock (1999)
5. Biography - Jimi Hendrix: The Man They Made God (2000)
6. Jimi Hendrix : Blues (Deluxe Version) (2010)
7. Biography - Jimi Hendrix: Voodoo Child (2010)
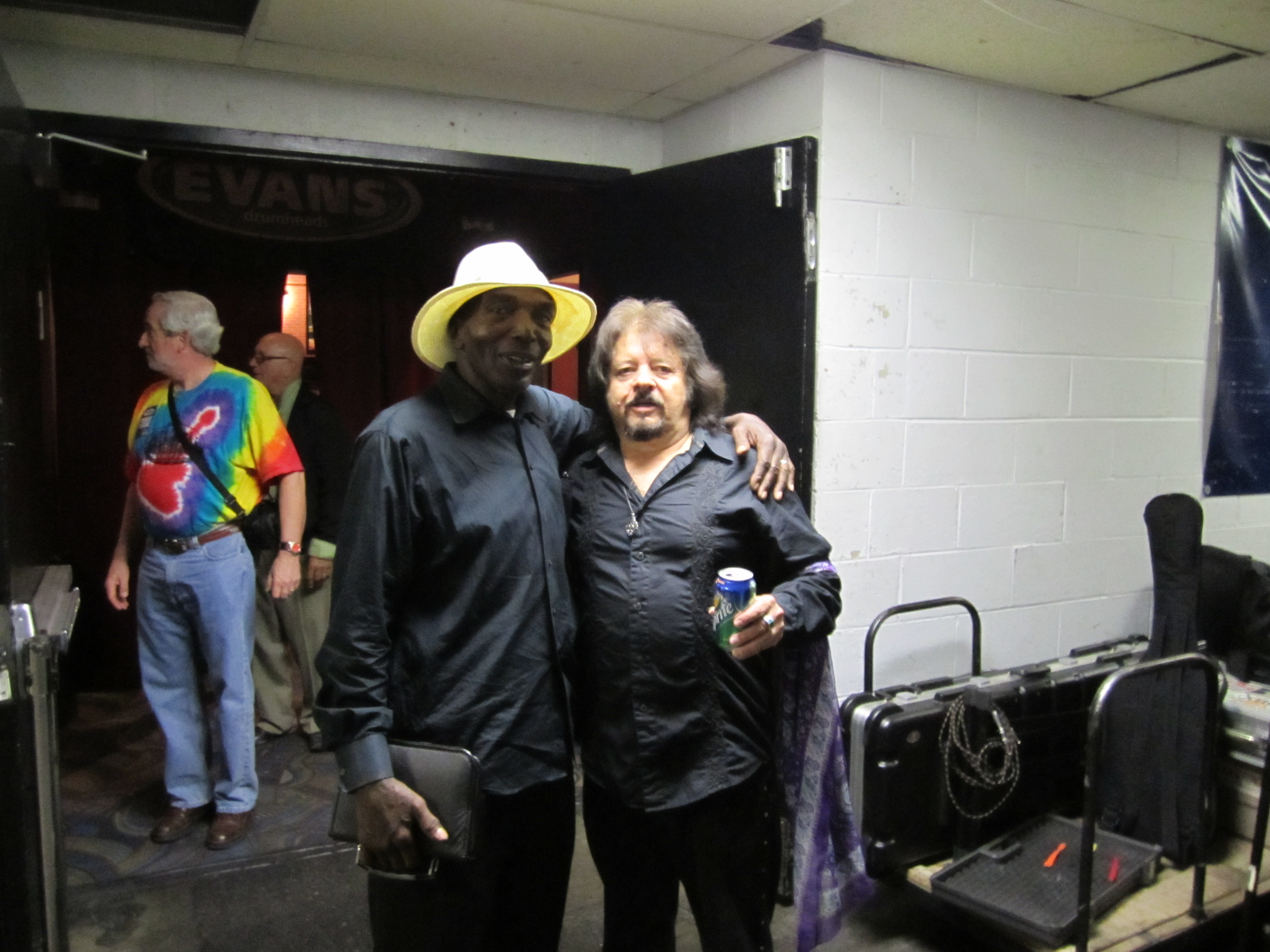
