= Rainbow Bridge (album) =

Soundtrack album by Jimi Hendrix
- Released: October 1971
- Recorded: October 22, 1968 – July 1, 1970
- Venue: Berkeley Community Center (Berkeley) (Note: "Hear My Train A Comin'")
- Studios: Electric Lady (Note: "Dolly Dagger", "Pali Gap" and "Hey Baby (New Rising Sun)") and Record Plant (Note: "Earth Blues", "Room Full of Mirrors" and "Star Spangled Banner") (New York); TTG (Note: "Look Over Yonder") (Los Angeles)
- Genres: Blues; psychedelia
- Length: 42:22
- Label: Reprise
- Producers: Jimi Hendrix; Mitch Mitchell; Eddie Kramer; John Jansen

Jimi Hendrix US chronology
The Cry of Love (1971)	Rainbow Bridge (1971)	Hendrix in the West (1972)

Jimi Hendrix UK chronology
Isle of Wight (1971)	Rainbow Bridge (1971)	Hendrix in the West (1972)

Singles from Rainbow Bridge
- 1. "Dolly Dagger" / "Star Spangled Banner" Released: October 23, 1971 (US)

Rainbow Bridge (subtitled Original Motion Picture Sound Track) is a posthumous album by the American musician Jimi Hendrix. It was released in October 1971 through Reprise Records, and was produced by Mitch Mitchell, Eddie Kramer, and John Jansen, with Hendrix receiving a production credit as well. The album was the second released after Hendrix's death to consist primarily of previously unreleased studio material, much of which was intended for a potential fourth studio album.

Despite being labeled as a soundtrack, the album is generally regarded as a compilation. While tracks included do appear as incidental music within the Rainbow Bridge film, the album does not include music from Hendrix's Maui performance which comprised his appearance in the movie. Five of the album's tracks–"Dolly Dagger", "Earth Blues", "Room Full of Mirrors", "Hear My Train A Comin'" and "Hey Baby (New Rising Sun)"—were potential inclusions for Hendrix's fourth album. The majority of the album sees Hendrix backed by Billy Cox on bass and Mitchell on drums.

Upon release, Rainbow Bridge was met with positive reviews by critics and was a commercial success. The album peaked at number 15 on the Billboard 200, while "Dolly Dagger", the album's only single, reached number 74 on the Billboard Hot 100, making it Hendrix's last charting single. Critics praised both Hendrix's playing along with the quality of songwriting, and the record continues to be regarded as one of the best of the guitarist's posthumous releases. The album was reissued by Experience Hendrix in 2014 on both vinyl and CD (the album's first official appearance on the latter format), while the material included has appeared on various other releases since, including First Rays of the New Rising Sun and South Saturn Delta (both 1997).

== Background ==
Despite the title, Rainbow Bridge was not a soundtrack to the film of the same name but rather a compilation of one live song and studio recordings from a number of sources between 1968 and 1970, including some for his planned but unfinished double album First Rays of the New Rising Sun. "Look Over Yonder" began as "Mr. Bad Luck" while Hendrix was performing in Greenwich Village, New York City, with his group Jimmy James and the Blue Flames in the summer of 1966. The version included on Rainbow Bridge was recorded by the Experience in 1968. "Room Full of Mirrors" had been performed live by the Experience, with one recording appearing on Experience (1971). "Hear My Train A Comin'" is another song that dates back to the Experience. They had attempted several studio recordings, but these were passed over (along with a version with Cox and Buddy Miles) and a live recording from the first show on May 30, 1970, at the Berkeley Community Theatre was used instead. An edited version appears in the 1971 concert film Jimi Plays Berkeley.

A new studio recording of "Room Full of Mirrors" and "Earth Blues" are two of the few largely completed studio recordings with Cox and Miles, although Mitchell later overdubbed the drum parts on the latter. Two additional songs, "Izabella" and "Stepping Stone" had been released as a single (listed as "Hendrix Band of Gypsys"), but Hendrix wished to rework them for his proposed fourth album. However, just as "Dolly Dagger" and "Room Full of Mirrors" were withheld from The Cry of Love, these were pulled from the Rainbow Bridge track listing in the final stages. Instead they were used to improve the next posthumous release War Heroes. "The Star-Spangled Banner" is a 1969 solo studio recording by Hendrix. The remainder of the songs were recorded with Mitchell and Cox between June and August 1970: "Dolly Dagger", "Pali Gap", and "Hey Baby (New Rising Sun)".

The album was the second to be produced by Eddie Kramer and Mitch Mitchell, with John Jansen assisting. It was released in October 1971 in the US, and the following month in the UK where it reached numbers 15 and 16 respectively in the album charts. The album also peaked at No. 9 on the U.S. Best Selling Soul LP's chart. "Dolly Dagger" with "The Star-Spangled Banner" as the B-side was released as a single in the US in October 1971. It appeared at number 74 in the Billboard Hot 100 pop chart. In 2014, the original Rainbow Bridge album was reissued in both CD and LP formats.

== Critical reception ==
Retrospective professional reviews
Review scores
Source	Rating
AllMusic	4/5 stars
Christgau's Record Guide	A–
Classic Rock	7/10
The Encyclopedia of Popular Music	2/5 stars
Mojo	4/5 stars
The Rolling Stone Album Guide	3.5/5 stars

According to AllMusic's Sean Westergaard, "when Rainbow Bridge was originally released, it was actually among the best of the posthumous Hendrix releases ... a mix of excellent, finished studio tracks and a couple of live tracks." In a contemporary review for Rolling Stone, Tony Glover wrote favorably of the songs on side one, particularly the "really majestic version" of "The Star-Spangled Banner". In Christgau's Record Guide: Rock Albums of the Seventies (1981), Robert Christgau said while The Cry of Love (1971) highlighted Hendrix's abilities as a songwriter, Rainbow Bridge showcased his guitar playing:

Rich stuff, exploring territory that as always with Hendrix consists not merely of notes but of undifferentiated sound, a sound he shapes with a virtuosity no one else has ever achieved on an electric instrument.

== Track listing ==
All tracks are written by Jimi Hendrix, except "Star Spangled Banner", written by Francis Scott Key. (Note: The album's liner notes list the writing credit for "Star Spangled Banner" as "traditional")

Side one
No.	Title	Later release	Length
1.	"Dolly Dagger"	First Rays of the New Rising Sun	4:45
2.	"Earth Blues"	First Rays of the New Rising Sun	4:20
3.	"Pali Gap"	South Saturn Delta	5:05
4.	"Room Full of Mirrors"	First Rays of the New Rising Sun	3:17
5.	"Star Spangled Banner" (studio)	The Jimi Hendrix Experience	4:07
Total length:			21:34

Side two
No.	Title	Later release	Length
1.	"Look Over Yonder"	South Saturn Delta	3:28
2.	"Hear My Train A Comin'" (Live at Berkeley)	Blues	11:15
3.	"Hey Baby (New Rising Sun)"	First Rays of the New Rising Sun	6:05
Total length:			20:48 42:22

=== Notes ===
- The Record Plant recording of "Earth Blues" was later released on People, Hell and Angels in 2013.
- The Record Plant recording of "Room Full of Mirrors" was later released on The Jimi Hendrix Experience box set in 2000.

== Recording details ==
Track	Location(s)	Recording date(s)
"Dolly Dagger"	Electric Lady Studios, New York City	June 25, July 14 & 19, and August 14 & 20, 1970
"Earth Blues"	Record Plant & Electric Lady, New York City	December 19, 1969; January 20 & June 26, 1970
"Pali Gap"	Electric Lady	July 1, 1970
"Room Full of Mirrors"	Record Plant, Electric Lady	November 17, 1969; June, July, & August 20, 1970
"The Star-Spangled Banner"	Record Plant	March 18, 1969
"Look Over Yonder"	TTG Studios, Hollywood, California	October 22, 1968
"Hear My Train A Comin'"	Berkeley Community Theatre, Berkeley, California	May 30, 1970 (first show)
"Hey Baby (New Rising Sun)"	Electric Lady	July 1, 1970

== Personnel ==
From the original Reprise LP liner notes (supplemented with details from the First Rays of the New Rising Sun CD booklet):

Band members

- Jimi Hendrix – lead vocals, guitar, backing vocals on "Dolly Dagger" & "Earth Blues", production, mixing on "Dolly Dagger", "Room Full of Mirrors"
- Billy Cox – bass guitar on all tracks (except "The Star-Spangled Banner", "Look Over Yonder")
- Mitch Mitchell – drums on all tracks (except "The Star-Spangled Banner", "Room Full of Mirrors"), posthumous production

Additional musicians

- The Ghetto Fighters a.k.a. Arthur and Albert Allen – backing vocals on "Dolly Dagger"
- Juma Edwards a.k.a. Juma Sultan – percussion on "Dolly Dagger", "Pali Gap", "Hey Baby (The New Rising Sun)"
- Buddy Miles – drums on "Room Full of Mirrors", backing vocals on "Earth Blues"
- The Ronettes (Veronica Bennett, Estelle Bennett, Nedra Talley) – backing vocals on "Earth Blues"
- Simeon (Simeon Oliver Coxe III) – bass oscillators on "The Star-Spangled Banner" (uncredited)
- Noel Redding – bass guitar on "Look Over Yonder"

Additional personnel

- Michael Jeffrey – executive production
- Eddie Kramer – posthumous production, engineering on all tracks (except "Earth Blues", "Look Over Yonder", "Hear My Train A Comin'"), mixing on all tracks
- John Jansen – posthumous production, mixing on "Earth Blues", "Pali Gap", "Look Over Yonder", "Hey Baby (The New Rising Sun)"
- Tony Bongiovi – engineering on "Room Full of Mirrors"
- Angel Balestier – engineering on "Look Over Yonder"
- Abe Jacob – engineering on "Hear My Train A Comin'"
- The Pineal Playhouse – album design
- Daniel Tahaney – still photography

== Notes ==
Footnotes

Citations

References

- Christgau, Robert (1981). "Jimi Hendrix". Rock Albums of the '70s: A Critical Guide. Da Capo Press. p. 174. ISBN 0306804093.
- Glover, Tony (December 9, 1971). "Rainbow Bridge". Rolling Stone. New York City.
- McDermott, John; Kramer, Eddie; Cox, Billy (2009). Ultimate Hendrix. New York City: Backbeat Books. ISBN 978-0-87930-938-1.
- Shapiro, Harry; Glebbeek, Caesar (1990). "Appendix 1 – Music, Sweet Music: The Discography". Jimi Hendrix: Electric Gypsy. New York City: St. Martin's Griffin. ISBN 0-312-05861-6.
