= West Coast Seattle Boy: The Jimi Hendrix Anthology =

Box set by Jimi Hendrix
- Released: November 16, 2010
- Recorded: 1964–1970
- Genres: Rhythm and blues, rock
- Length: 250:00
- Labels: Experience Hendrix, Legacy

Jimi Hendrix chronology
Fire: The Jimi Hendrix Collection (2010)	West Coast Seattle Boy: The Jimi Hendrix Anthology (2010)	Winterland (2011)

Professional ratings
Review scores
Source	Rating
AllMusic	4/5 stars
Classic Rock	8/10 stars
Rolling Stone	4.5/5 stars

West Coast Seattle Boy: The Jimi Hendrix Anthology is a posthumous box set by American rock musician Jimi Hendrix. The set was released on November 16, 2010, in the US and includes four discs of previously unreleased studio and live recordings as well as a DVD with a documentary based on the life and career of Hendrix directed by Bob Smeaton called Jimi Hendrix Voodoo Child.

Disc one documents Jimi's time as a backing guitarist for other musicians. A single disc "Best of" edition is also available, with or without the documentary. The box-set is available in a deluxe edition featuring eight 12-inch vinyl LPs.

== Track listing ==
* = Previously unreleased alternate recording
** = Previously unreleased recording

=== Deluxe Edition ===
Disc one
No.	Title	Length
1.	"Testify" (Isley Brothers)	4:09
2.	"Mercy, Mercy" (Don Covay & the Goodtimers)	2:26
3.	"Can't Stay Away" (Don Covay & the Goodtimers)	2:50
4.	"My Diary" (Rosa Lee Brooks)	2:22
5.	"Utee" (Brooks)	1:58
6.	"I Don't Know What You Got (But It's Got Me)" (Little Richard)	4:02
7.	"Dancing All Around the World" (Little Richard)	3:00
8.	"I'm So Glad" (Frank Howard & the Commanders)	2:39
9.	"Move Over and Let Me Dance" (Isley Brothers)	2:41
10.	"Have You Ever Been Disappointed" (Isley Brothers)	6:19
11.	"Help Me (Get the Feeling) (Part I)" (Ray Sharpe)	2:33
12.	"(My Girl) She's a Fox" (The Icemen)	2:43
13.	"That Little Old Groovemaker" (Jimmy Norman)	2:16
14.	"Sweet Thang" (Billy Lamont)	2:33
15.	"Instant Groove" (King Curtis)	2:24

Disc two
No.	Title	Length
1.	"Fire" (*)	2:51
2.	"Are You Experienced?" (**)	6:04
3.	"May This Be Love" (*)	3:18
4.	"Can You See Me" (*)	2:34
5.	"The Wind Cries Mary" (Live at Stockholm, Sweden, September 5, 1967)	3:57
6.	"Love or Confusion" (*)	3:16
7.	"Little One" (**)	4:11
8.	"Mr. Bad Luck" (*)	2:57
9.	"Cat Talking to Me" (*)	2:54
10.	"Castles Made of Sand" (**)	3:12
11.	"Tears of Rage" (**) (Written by: Bob Dylan, Richard Manuel)	5:22
12.	"Hear My Train A Comin'" (**)	4:37
13.	"1983... (A Merman I Should Turn to Be)" (**)	3:31
14.	"Long Hot Summer Night" (**)	2:32
15.	"My Friend"	3:59
16.	"Angel" (**)	3:11
17.	"Calling All the Devil's Children" (**)	5:38
18.	"New Rising Sun" (*)	7:24

Disc three
No.	Title	Length
1.	"Hear My Freedom" (**)	5:23
2.	"Room Full of Mirrors" (**)	2:32
3.	"Shame, Shame, Shame" (**)	3:01
4.	"Messenger" (**)	3:20
5.	"Hound Dog Blues" (**)	4:44
6.	"Untitled Basic Track" (Previously unreleased recording)	3:49
7.	"Star Spangled Banner" (Live at The Forum, Los Angeles, April 26, 1969)	2:29
8.	"Purple Haze" (Live at The Forum, Los Angeles, April 26, 1969)	5:51
9.	"Young/Hendrix" (*)	20:57
10.	"Mastermind" (**)	4:44
11.	"Message to Love" (*)	3:27
12.	"Fire" (* Live at the Fillmore East, New York City, December 31, 1969)	4:41
13.	"Foxey Lady" (* Live at the Fillmore East, New York, December 31, 1969)	6:29

Disc four
No.	Title	Length
1.	"Stone Free" (** Live at the Fillmore East, New York, December 31, 1969)	14:46
2.	"Burning Desire" (**)	8:46
3.	"Lonely Avenue" (**)	4:22
4.	"Everlasting First" (* featuring Arthur Lee)	4:13
5.	"Freedom" (**)	4:15
6.	"Peter Gunn/Catastrophe" (*)	3:06
7.	"In from the Storm" (*)	3:34
8.	"All God's Children" (**)	6:19
9.	"Red House" (** Live at Berkeley Community Theatre, Berkeley, California, May 30, 1970)	7:29
10.	"Play That Riff (Thank You)" (**)	0:35
11.	"Bolero" (**)	5:31
12.	"Hey Baby (New Rising Sun)"	6:05
13.	"Suddenly November Morning" (**)	4:12

=== Single-disc edition ===
All tracks are written by Jimi Hendrix, except where noted.

No.	Title	Length
1.	"Fire *"	2:51
2.	"Love or Confusion *"	3:16
3.	"Room Full of Mirrors **"	2:32
4.	"Shame, Shame, Shame **"	3:01
5.	"Mr. Bad Luck *"	2:57
6.	"May This Be Love *"	3:18
7.	"Are You Experienced? **"	6:04
8.	"Tears of Rage **" (Dylan, Manuel)	5:22
9.	"Hear My Freedom **"	5:23
10.	"Hound Dog Blues **"	4:44
11.	"Lonely Avenue **"	4:22
12.	"Burning Desire **"	8:49
13.	"In from the Storm *"	3:36
14.	"Bolero **"	5:31
15.	"Hey Baby (New Rising Sun)"	6:06

== Recordings ==
- 2.1 & 2.6 at De Lane Lea Studios, London, January 11, 1967 (engineer Dave Siddle), and Olympic Studios, London, February 8, 1967 (engineer Eddie Kramer). Mixed at LAFX Studios, North Hollywood, CA.
- 2.2 at Olympic Studios, London, April 3, 1967. Mixed at Electric Lady Studios, New York City.
- 2.3 at Olympic Studios, London, April 3 & 4, 1967. Mixed at LAFX Studios, North Hollywood, CA.
- 2.4 at De Lane Lea Studios, London, November / December, 1967. Mixed at Olympic Studios, London, April 24, 1967. Of course there is a transcript error.
- 2.5 in Stockholm, Sweden, September 5, 1967. Tape transfer at NRG Studios, North Hollywood, CA.
- 2.7 at Olympic Studios, London, December 28 & 29, 1967. Mixed at Avatar Studios, New York City.
- 2.8 at Olympic Studios, London, May 5, 1967. Mixed at LAFX Studios, North Hollywood, CA.
- 2.9 at Olympic Studios, London, June 5, 1967. Mixed at Avatar Studios, New York City.
- 2.10 at Olympic Studios, London, October 5, 1967. Mixed at Legacy Studios, New York City.
- 2.11 to 2.16 at Jimi's hotel room, New York City, March 1968. Tape transfer at LAFX Studios, North Hollywood, CA.
- 2.17 & 3.1 at T.T.G. Studios, Hollywood, CA, October 21, 1968. Mixed at LAFX Studios, North Hollywood, CA.
- 2.18 at T.T.G. Studios, Hollywood, CA, October 23, 1968. Mixed at LAFX Studios, North Hollywood, CA.
- 3.2 & 3.3 at Olympic Studios, London, February 16, 1969. Additional bass and drum recording at Air Studios, London, May 7, 1987. Mixed at Avatar Studios, New York City.
- 3.4 & 3.6 at T.T.G. Studios, Hollywood, CA, October 20, 1968. Mixed at LAFX Studios, North Hollywood, CA.
- 3.5 at Olympic Studios, London, February 22, 1969. Mixed at LAFX Studios, North Hollywood, CA.
- 3.7 & 3.8 live at The Forum, Los Angeles, CA, April 26, 1969. Mixed at Wally Heider Recording, Los Angeles, CA, June 8, 1969.
- 3.9 at Record Plant, New York City, April 14, 1969. Mixed at LAFX Studios, North Hollywood, CA.
- 3.10 at Hit Factory, New York City, September 4, 1969. Mixed at LAFX Studios, North Hollywood, CA.
- 3.11 at Record Plant, New York City, December 19, 1969 (engineer Bob Cotto). and January 20, 1970 (engineer Bob Hughes).

Mixed at Electric Lady Studios, New York City, August 22, 1970.

- 3.12 to 4.1 live at Fillmore East, New York City, December 31, 1969, (second show). Mixed at Capitol Studios, Hollywood, CA.
- 4.2 at Record Plant, New York City, January 16, 1970. Mixed at LAFX Studios, North Hollywood, CA.
- 4.3 at Record Plant, New York City, November 10, 1969. Mixed at LAFX Studios, North Hollywood, CA.
- 4.4 at Olympic Studios, London, March 17, 1970. Mixed at Electric Lady Studios, New York City. In the booklet erroneously it was transcribed: Olympic Studios, New York.
- 4.5 at Record Plant, New York City, May 15, 1970. Mixed at LAFX Studios, North Hollywood, CA.
- 4.6 at Record Plant, New York City, May 14, 1970. Mixed at LAFX Studios, North Hollywood, CA.
- 4.7 at Electric Lady Studios, New York City, July 21–22, and August 20, 1970. Mixed at Electric Lady Studios, New York City, August 20, 1970.
- 4.8 at Electric Lady Studios, New York City, June 15, 1970. Mixed at LAFX Studios, North Hollywood, CA.
- 4.9 live at Berkeley Community Theatre, Berkeley, CA, May 30, 1970. Mixed at Clinton Studio, New York City.
- 4.10 at Electric Lady Studios, New York City, July 19, 1970. Mixed at Electric Lady Studios, New York City, July 19, 1970.
- 4.11 & 4.12 at Electric Lady Studios, New York City, July 1, 1970. Mixed at LAFX Studios, North Hollywood, CA.
- 4.13 at Jimi's apartment, Greenwich Village, New York City, in 1970

== Certifications ==
Region	Certification	Certified units/sales
Portugal (AFP)	Platinum	20,000^{^}
^{^} Shipments figures based on certification alone.
