= Jeffrey M. Ramsdell =

American judge

Jeffrey M. Ramsdell (born December 4, 1955) is a judge of the Superior Court of Washington for King County (Seattle).
