= The Cry of Love =

Studio album / compilation by Jimi Hendrix
- Released: March 5, 1971
- Recorded: March 13, 1968; December 8, 1969-August 24, 1970
- Studios: Electric Lady; Record Plant; Sound Center (New York)
- Genre: Rock
- Length: 39:48
- Labels: Polydor/Track (UK); Reprise (US)
- Producers: Jimi Hendrix; Eddie Kramer; Mitch Mitchell

Jimi Hendrix US chronology
Historic Performances (1970)	The Cry of Love (1971)	Rainbow Bridge (1971)

Jimi Hendrix UK chronology
Band of Gypsys (1970)	The Cry of Love (1971)	Experience (1971)

Singles from The Cry of Love
- 1. "Freedom" / "Angel" Released: March 8, 1971 (US); 2. "Angel" / "Night Bird Flying" Released: 1971 (UK)

The Cry of Love is the first posthumous album of music by the American rock singer-songwriter and guitarist Jimi Hendrix. Recorded primarily in 1970, it features new material that Hendrix was working on for his planned fourth studio album before his death later that year. While most of the songs were included on proposed track listings by Hendrix, the final selection was made by recording engineer Eddie Kramer and drummer Mitch Mitchell, with input from manager Michael Jeffery. Hendrix, Kramer, and Mitchell are credited as the album's producers, with Jeffery as the executive producer.

Released on March 5, 1971, six months after his death on September 18, 1970, by Reprise Records in the United States and Track Records in the United Kingdom, The Cry of Love was successful on the record charts in both countries and was certified platinum by the Recording Industry Association of America (RIAA) in 1998. Critics responded favorably to the album, viewing it as an impressive tribute to Hendrix. Several of its songs were later featured on other efforts to recreate the album Hendrix had been working on, including Voodoo Soup in 1995 and First Rays of the New Rising Sun in 1997.

== Recording and production ==
The Cry of Love featured songs Hendrix had been working on at the time of his death and was the first attempt at presenting his planned first studio recording since the breakup of the Jimi Hendrix Experience. The Cry of Love is composed mostly of songs which Hendrix recorded in 1970 at his new Electric Lady Studios in New York City with drummer Mitch Mitchell and bassist Billy Cox.

About half of the album's ten songs were nearly completed with mixes prepared by Hendrix. The balance were in varying stages of development and were mixed (and some overdubbed with new parts) after his death. Two songs originally planned for The Cry of Love, "Dolly Dagger" and "Room Full of Mirrors", were instead held for the next planned Hendrix release, Rainbow Bridge; they were replaced by "Straight Ahead" and "My Friend".

The album credits Hendrix as a producer, as well as long-time recording engineer Eddie Kramer and Mitchell, who prepared the final mixes and track selection, with input from manager Michael Jeffery.

Seven of the songs on The Cry of Love were later included on Voodoo Soup, the 1995 attempt by producer Alan Douglas to present Hendrix's planned album. In 1997, all were included on First Rays of the New Rising Sun, along with seven other songs, in Kramer's most realized effort to complete Hendrix's last studio album.

== Album format ==
According to music journalist Peter Doggett, the album was "accepted for years as an authentic Hendrix album rather than a posthumous compilation." Doggett himself described The Cry of Love as "Kramer's concoction", while other music writers have identified it as being authorized or sanctioned by Hendrix himself. Music historian Martin Huxley, The Guardian's Jeremy Allen, and rock music journalist Eduardo Rivadavia call it a compilation album; music writers Phil Hardy, Frank N. Magill, and Richard Kienzle identify it as an "authorized", "true", or "formal" studio album. Guitar World journalist Alan di Perna describes it as a "half-finished studio album".

In Ritchie Unterberger's opinion: "although many songs had been laid down in a state of near-completion, there's no telling what Jimi might have added, erased, or otherwise changed, especially bearing in mind his perfectionist nature ... The biggest compromise, however, was the decision to make the record a single disc, rather than the double LP that Hendrix had envisioned. ... For these reasons, [The Cry of Love] can't be considered to be the fourth studio album Hendrix would have released had he survived, whether it would have ended up being called First Rays of the Rising Sun or something else."

However, Billy Cox said: "we [Hendrix and I] discussed the possibility of doing a single or double LP, but it really didn't make that much of a difference. You must remember even though they [record label and management] gave him a lot of freedom in the studio, when the record deal itself came about, he did not have the last say-so."

== Release and reception ==
Retrospective professional reviews
Review scores
Source	Rating
AllMusic	4/5 stars
Christgau's Record Guide	A
Classic Rock	6/10
Down Beat	4.5/5 stars
Encyclopedia of Popular Music	3/5 stars
The Great Rock Discography	7/10
MusicHound Rock	2/5
The Rolling Stone Album Guide	4/5 stars
The Sydney Morning Herald	4.5/5 stars
Tom Hull – on the Web	B+

The Cry of Love was released on March 5, 1971. The album entered Billboard's Top LP's chart in the US at number 17 on March 6 and eventually reached number three. By April, it had achieved one million dollars in sales, and, in 1998, the Recording Industry Association of America (RIAA) certified the album platinum, which indicated sales of one million copies. In the UK, it entered the UK Albums Chart on April 3, where it peaked at number two.

Reviewing for Rolling Stone in 1971, Lenny Kaye hailed The Cry of Love as the authentic posthumous Hendrix album, his last work, and "a beautiful, poignant testimonial, a fitting coda to the career of a man who was clearly the finest electric guitarist to be produced by the Sixties, bar none". That same year, Robert Christgau wrote in The Village Voice that the album is an "excellent testament" and may be Hendrix's best record behind Electric Ladyland (1968) because of its quality as a whole rather than its individual songs. Years later, he said the album as whole is free-flowing, devoid of affectations, and "warmer than the three Experience LPs", while writing in Christgau's Record Guide: Rock Albums of the Seventies (1981):

It isn't just the flow—these tracks work as individual compositions, from offhand rhapsodies like "Angel" and "Night Bird Flying" through primal riffsongs like "Ezy Ryder" and "Astro Man" to inspired goofs like "My Friend" and "Belly Button Window." What a testament.

In the Encyclopedia of Popular Music (2006), Colin Larkin called The Cry of Love a "fitting tribute" to Hendrix, and Paul Evans wrote in The Rolling Stone Album Guide (1992) that it "showed the master, playing with Cox and Mitchell, at his most confident: 'Ezy Rider' and 'Angel' are the tough and tender faces of the genius at his most appealing." In 2014, VH1 deemed The Cry of Love "the greatest posthumous classic rock record of all time". That same year, it was reissued in both CD and LP formats by Experience Hendrix. Reviewing the reissue for Classic Rock magazine, Hugh Fielder acknowledged the "glories" of the original album's songs but questioned its value given their inclusion on 1997's First Rays of the New Rising Sun. However, Dan Bigna from The Sydney Morning Herald said in his review that, although all of the songs had been compiled on the more comprehensive First Rays collection, "there is something satisfying about having this first posthumous Hendrix release as a distinct object that illuminates the brush strokes of a genius".

== Track listing ==
All tracks are written by Jimi Hendrix.

Side one
No.	Title	Track position on First Rays of the New Rising Sun	Length
1.	"Freedom"	1	3:24
2.	"Drifting"	8	3:46
3.	"Ezy Ryder"	7	4:09
4.	"Night Bird Flying"	3	3:50
5.	"My Friend"	11	4:40
Total length:			19:49

Side two
No.	Title	Track position on First Rays of the New Rising Sun	Length
1.	"Straight Ahead"	12	4:42
2.	"Astro Man"	15	3:37
3.	"Angel"	4	4:25
4.	"In from the Storm"	16	3:42
5.	"Belly Button Window"	17	3:34
Total length:			20:00 39:49

== Personnel ==
From the original Reprise LP liner notes, supplemented with details from the First Rays of the New Rising Sun CD booklet.

Band members

- Jimi Hendrix – lead vocals, guitars; piano on "Freedom"; backing vocals on "In From the Storm"; production, mixing on "Freedom," "Ezy Ryder," Nightbird Flying," "Astro Man," and "Belly Button Window"
- Billy Cox – bass guitar all tracks except "My Friend" and "Belly Button Window"
- Mitch Mitchell – drums all tracks except "Ezy Ryder," "My Friend," and "Belly Button Window"; posthumous production and mixing on "Angel"

Additional musicians

- Juma Sultan – percussion on "Freedom" and "Astro Man"
- The Ghetto Fighters a.k.a. Arthur and Albert Allen – backing vocals on "Freedom"
- Buzzy Linhart – vibraphone on "Drifting"
- Buddy Miles – drums on "Ezy Rider"
- Billy Armstrong – percussion on "Ezy Rider"
- Steve Winwood, Chris Wood – backing vocals on "Ezy Rider"
- Kenny Pine – twelve-string guitar on "My Friend"
- Stephen Stills – piano on "My Friend" (uncredited)
- Noel Redding – bass guitar on "My Friend"
- Jimmy Mayes – drums on "My Friend"
- Paul Caruso a.k.a. Gers – harmonica on "My Friend"
- Emeretta Marks – backing vocals on "In From the Storm"

Additional personnel

- Michael Jeffery – executive production
- Eddie Kramer – posthumous production, engineering all tracks except on "Ezy Rider" and "My Friend"; mixing on all tracks
- Jack Abrams – engineering on "Ezy Rider" (1969)
- Bob Hughes – engineering on "Ezy Rider" (1970)
- Nancy Reiner – cover art work
- Victor Kahn-Sunshine – photography, graphic design

== Charts ==
Chart performance for The Cry of Love
Chart (1971)	Peak position
Canada RPM 100 Albums	3
Norway Charts	7
UK Albums Chart	2
US Billboard 200	3
US Best Selling Soul LP's	6
