= It's Too Bad =

Song performed by Jimi Hendrix

Song by Jimi Hendrix

from the album The Jimi Hendrix Experience
- Released: September 12, 2000
- Recorded: February 11, 1969
- Studio: Record Plant, New York City
- Genre: Blues
- Length: 8:52
- Label: MCA
- Songwriter: Jimi Hendrix
- Producer: Jimi Hendrix

"It's Too Bad" is a jazz-blues-influenced song written by Jimi Hendrix in 1969. Recorded by Hendrix that same year with American rock and funk musician Buddy Miles on drums and Grammy Award-winner Duane Hitchings on organ, the song was released a little more than thirty years later on the box set The Jimi Hendrix Experience.

== History ==
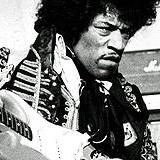
American musician, singer and songwriter Jimi Hendrix

In 1969, Jimi Hendrix's half-brother, Leon Hendrix, was suffering from drug addiction and other problems. After Leon approached his successful half-brother Jimi and asked him for money, Hendrix wrote, "It's Too Bad". On Tuesday, February 11, 1969, Hendrix was at Record Plant Studios in New York City producing the song "I Can See" for his friends in the Buddy Miles Express band at a recording session that went from 12:00 am to 4:00 am. With musician Buddy Miles on drums and Duane Hitchings on organ, the Buddy Miles Express band recorded "I Can See" (later retitled "Destructive Love") as Hendrix operated the mixing console. After the song was recorded, Hendrix came from behind the control room console to play guitar for two impromptu originals, "World Traveler", a guitar-and-organ duel between Hendrix and Hitchings, and "It's Too Bad". Both songs were recorded in one take. Hitchings remarked about his experience recording with Hendrix, noting in 2010: "Jamming with him was an amazing experience. I was scared to death!".

== Interpretation ==
In the 1969 song track, Hendrix plays the roles of both himself and his brother Leon. Backed by modern-day blues, the song begins with "It's too bad, Lord, my brother can't be here today", to explore Hendrix's uneasy relationship with Leon, a theme that Hendrix also explored in his 1969 song, "Shame, Shame, Shame". In "It's Too Bad", the song notes how Hendrix sent Leon "a-crying away", and goes on to address Hendrix's uneasy relationship with other African-Americans, noting: "So I'll go way across the tracks ... And man they treat me the same way as you do ... [They] say man until you come back, completely black, go back where you came from too". Music reviews attributed the uneasy community connection expressed in the song to 1960s-1970s African-Americans' objection to Hendrix's "colorblind vision" by accusing Hendrix of "achieving stardom by pandering to rock's largely white audience". The song also makes reference to Hendrix's 1968 song "Room Full of Mirrors", which refers to a cracked mirror metaphor Hendrix used to convey the many sides of his emotions.

== Hendrix Estate ==
After Hendrix died without a will in 1970, his father, Al, received the rights to Hendrix's estate, including "It's Too Bad". A little more than thirty years after the song was recorded, it was one of four Hendrix songs newly discovered and added to The Jimi Hendrix Experience, a four-disc box set. In reviewing the song on The Jimi Hendrix Experience (2000), producer and audio engineer Eddie Kramer noted about the tune: "I think it's very clever, and very, very emotionally charged. It has a tremendous wallop". Two years later, Hendrix's father died and Leon sued their father's estate and Hendrix's stepsister Janie to gain control over about one-quarter of US$80 million. After Washington Superior Court judge Jeffrey M. Ramsdell limited Leon's claim to a single gold record left to him when his father died in 2002, Janie remarked in 2004 about the lawsuit: "Jimi wrote a song about Leon and it was called, 'It's Too Bad'. The lyrics to that song are what this is all about".
