= Night Bird Flying =

Song by Jimi Hendrix

from the album The Cry of Love
- A-side: "Angel" (UK)
- B-side: "Freedom"
- Released: March 5, 1971
- Recorded: June 16, 1970; July 19 & August 22, 1970 (overdubs)
- Studio: Electric Lady, New York City
- Genre: Rock
- Length: 3:50
- Label: Reprise (US); Track (UK)
- Songwriter: Jimi Hendrix
- Producers: Jimi Hendrix; Eddie Kramer; Mitch Mitchell

"Night Bird Flying" is a rock song written by Jimi Hendrix. It is a complex piece with multiple guitar parts and reflects a variety of styles. Lyrically, Hendrix continues to explore an idealized feminine figure, as in his 1967 song "Little Wing".

Hendrix recorded the piece in the summer of 1970 at his new Electric Lady Studios with drummer Mitch Mitchell and bassist Billy Cox. He proposed the song for his fourth album and it is one of the few that are seen as largely complete. "Night Bird Flying" was initially released on the first Hendrix posthumous album, The Cry of Love (1971). The song is included on several subsequent Hendrix compilations.

== Composition and recording ==
Hendrix used elements of the song's rhythm pattern in jams at TTG Studios in Los Angeles in October 1968. In early 1969, he started to develop it as "Ships Passing Through the Night" and several demos were recorded before Hendrix attempted a proper recording in his newly built Electric Lady Studios on June 16, 1970. After 32 takes, he completed the master. Overdubs were recorded on July 19 and August 22, before a final mix was accomplished on August 24, 1970. Hendrix and all involved in the recording were very pleased with the song and it was presented on the opening party of Electric Lady on August 26.

== Releases ==
The song was chosen as a B-side for "Dolly Dagger" and a master for a single was prepared by Reprise Records. However, the single was cancelled when Hendrix died on September 18, 1970. In 1971, the song was included on the posthumous Hendrix album, The Cry of Love. In the UK, it was released as the single B-side to "Angel" on Track Records. Later, the song was included on Voodoo Soup (1995) and First Rays of the New Rising Sun (1997), which were further attempts to present Hendrix's planned but unreleased fourth studio album. An alternate version appears on the 2000 box set The Jimi Hendrix Experience.

== Critical reception ==
Critic Matthew Greenwald, in a song review for AllMusic, called "Night Bird Flying" "[a]nother great example of Jimi Hendrix utilizing his Electric Lady recording studios as a composing tool", due to Hendrix's numerous guitar overdubs. He added that "[t]he song ends with a rousing, in-studio jam that again finds Hendrix capable of intertwining guitar lines with a dizzying symbiosis."
