= Freedom (Jimi Hendrix song) =

- Italian single picture sleeve

Single by Jimi Hendrix

from the album The Cry of Love
- B-side: "Angel"
- Released: March 5, 1971
- Recorded: June–August 1970
- Studio: Electric Lady, New York City
- Genre: Funk rock
- Length: 3:24
- Label: Reprise
- Songwriter(s): Jimi Hendrix
- Producer(s): Jimi Hendrix; Mitch Mitchell; Eddie Kramer

Jimi Hendrix U.S. singles chronology
"Stepping Stone" (1970)	"Freedom" (1971)	"Dolly Dagger" (1971)

"Freedom" is a rock song by Jimi Hendrix that is often regarded as one of the most fully realized pieces he wrote and recorded in the months before his death. It incorporates several musical styles and the lyrics reflect various situations facing Hendrix at the time.

Hendrix recorded the song in mid-1970 with his post-Band of Gypsys backing lineup of drummer Mitch Mitchell and bassist Billy Cox, along with additional musicians. "Freedom" became the opening track on The Cry of Love (1971) and, in the U.S., it was released as Hendrix's first posthumous single.

== Lyrics ==
In a song review for AllMusic, Matthew Greenwald writes: "The lyrics seems to be a simple, swaggering lust song (something Hendrix was indeed expert at), but the urban vibe in the title also relates to some of Hendrix's own managerial and business problems at the time." Biographer John McDermott also feels that the lyrics touch upon Hendrix's relationship with Devon Wilson and her heroin addiction:

You know you hooked my girlfriend,
You know the drugstore man
Well I don't need it now,
I'm just tryin' to slap it out of her hand!
Freedom! So I can live!

Music writer Keith Shadwick believes that the lyrics are among Hendrix's "strongest" from his last studio efforts and adds, "It could be about freedom in the wider world as much as it is a cry for freedom for two lovers at war with one another.

== Releases and charts ==
"Freedom" was released March 5, 1971, when it was used as the opening track on The Cry of Love, the first posthumous Hendrix album. In the US, the song was also released as a single and was only one of two posthumous Hendrix singles to appear on the Billboard Hot 100, where it reached number 59. In Canada the song reached number 70.

Record World said "The late genius' credo of personal liberation is breathtaking to hear again and again."

== Personnel ==
- Jimi Hendrix – lead vocals, guitar, piano
- Billy Cox – bass guitar
- Mitch Mitchell – drums
- Juma Sultan – percussion, conga
- The Ghetto Fighters a.k.a. Arthur and Albert Allen – backing vocals

== Other releases ==
"Freedom" is now one of the more popular songs in the Hendrix catalogue and is included on several compilations. In 1997, it was used to lead off First Rays of the New Rising Sun, the most comprehensive attempt to present Hendrix's planned fourth studio album. The song is also one of the post-Band of Gypsys developed numbers that Hendrix regularly performed in concert. (Note: Others include "Dolly Dagger", "Hey Baby (New Rising Sun)", "In from the Storm", and "Straight Ahead".)

Additional releases include:

Demos

- The Jimi Hendrix Experience – Record Plant, New York City, February 6, 1970
- West Coast Seattle Boy: The Jimi Hendrix Anthology – Record Plant, May 15, 1970

Performances

- Isle of Wight (1971) – recorded August 31, 1970
- Blue Wild Angel: Live at the Isle of Wight (2002) – as above
- Freedom: Atlanta Pop Festival (2015) – recorded July 4, 1970
- Live in Maui (2020) – recorded July 30, 1970

Compilations

- The Essential Jimi Hendrix (1978)
- Cornerstones: 1967–1970 (1990)
- Experience Hendrix: The Best of Jimi Hendrix (1997)
- Voodoo Child: The Jimi Hendrix Collection (2001) – live version from Isle of Wight

== Personnel ==
- Jimi Hendrix – lead vocals, guitar, piano
- Billy Cox – bass guitar
- Mitch Mitchell – drums
- Juma Sultan – percussion
- The Ghetto Fighters a.k.a. Arthur and Albert Allen – backing vocals

== Notes ==
Footnotes

Citations

References

- Hendrix, Janie (2003). Jimi Hendrix: The Lyrics. Milwaukee, Wisconsin: Hal Leonard. ISBN 0-634-04930-5.
- Loder, Kurt (2001). Voodoo Child: The Jimi Hendrix Collection (CD compilation booklet). Jimi Hendrix. Universal City, California: MCA Records. 066 112 603-2.
- McDermott, John (1997). First Rays of the New Rising Sun (CD booklet). Jimi Hendrix. Universal City, California: MCA Records.
- McDermott, John (2000). The Jimi Hendrix Experience (Box set booklet). Jimi Hendrix. Universal City, California: MCA Records. 08811 23162.
- McDermott, John (2002). Blue Wild Angel: Live at the Isle of Wight (DVD booklet). Jimi Hendrix. Santa Monica, California: MCA Records. OCLC 806443759. 088 170 341-9.
- McDermott, John; Kramer, Eddie; Cox, Billy (2009). Ultimate Hendrix. New York City: Backbeat Books. ISBN 978-0-87930-938-1.
- McDermott, John (2010). West Coast Seattle Boy: The Jimi Hendrix Anthology (CD set booklet). Jimi Hendrix. New York City: Legacy. 88697769272.
- Shadwick, Keith (2003). Jimi Hendrix: Musician. San Francisco, California: Backbeat Books. ISBN 0-87930-764-1.
- Shapiro, Harry; Glebbeek, Cesar (1990). Jimi Hendrix: Electric Gypsy. New York City: St. Martin's Press. ISBN 0-312-05861-6.
