= John Jansen (music producer) =

American record producer

- Born: October 3, 1947 (age 78); Connecticut, U.S.
- Genres: Pop; rock; rhythm and blues
- Occupations: Record producer; engineer
- Years active: 1970–present

John Jansen (born October 3, 1947) is an American recording engineer and music producer. He worked with a wide variety of artists over the years, mostly in the rock genre: Joe Cocker, the Who, Spencer Davis Group, Cat Mother, Paul Winter Consort, Roger Daltrey, Supertramp, Henry McCullough, Pavlov's Dog, Procol Harum, Blue Öyster Cult, the Dictators, Alice Cooper, Frankie Miller, Meatloaf, Yipes, the Motors, Television, Barry Manilow, Bonnie Tyler, Air Supply, the Bongos, Billy Squier, Britny Fox, Eric Clapton, Warrant, Tom Verlaine, Faster Pussycat, Bang Tango, Love/Hate, Cinderella, Alias, Judge Mercy, Jimi Hendrix, The Producers and Orchestra

== Jimi Hendrix recordings ==
Jansen was a studio assistant at Jimi Hendrix's Electric Lady Studios. He worked with Eddie Kramer on a 1972 Hendrix single that contained live versions of "Johnny B. Goode" and "Little Wing". The two tracks were later re-released on The Singles Album (1983).

He later worked with Kramer and Mitch Mitchell on First Rays of the New Rising Sun (1997).

== Other artists ==
Jansen also worked with Bang Tango, Love/Hate, Britny Fox, Meat Loaf, Lou Reed, Cinderella, Faster Pussycat, Procol Harum, and Warrant. Jansen did remixing on Eric Clapton's Crossroads (1988).
