= Experience Hendrix, L.L.C. =

- Founded: 1995
- Founder: Al Hendrix
- Distributor: Sony Music Entertainment
- Genre: Various
- Country of origin: United States
- Location: Seattle, Washington

Experience Hendrix is a company founded by Al Hendrix in 1995. The company released recordings by Jimi Hendrix until 2010.

== Background ==
Experience Hendrix, L.L.C. is based in Seattle, Washington, United States.

In 1995, after two years of legal issues, Al Hendrix, the father of Jimi Hendrix gained control of his son's legacy which included his music, name and likeness. The estimation was that it was worth $US60 million to $US90 million. Following the legal decision, Al and adopted daughter, Janie founded the Seattle-based Experience Hendrix, a management company, to handle the estate. Janie was adopted by Al at age five in 1968 when mother June Jinka had married Al.

The company which is dedicated to preserving the legacy of Jimi Hendrix serves fans and collectors of music and memorabilia in the classic rock genre.
