= Michael Jeffery (music manager) =

English music manager

- Born: Frank Michael Jeffery; 13 March 1933; Peckham, South London, England
- Died: 5 March 1973 (aged 39); Nantes, France
- Occupations: Businessman, music manager, publicist, agent, impresario
- Known for: Manager of Jimi Hendrix, The Animals, and Soft Machine

Frank Michael Jeffery (13 March 1933 – 5 March 1973) was an English music business manager of the 1960s who is best known for his management of The Animals and Jimi Hendrix, whom he co-managed for a time with former Animals bassist Chas Chandler. A former associate of noted English pop impresario Don Arden, Jeffery was and remains a controversial figure.

He died in a mid-air collision over Nantes, France in 1973, whilst on board an Iberia Airlines DC-9.

== Early life and career ==
Frank Michael Jeffery was born in 1933 at St Giles Hospital in Peckham, South London, to Alice Dorothy (née Curle) and Frank Albert E. Jeffery.

Jeffery was in National Service from 1951 and subsequently worked in the Intelligence Corps. He studied for a degree at Newcastle University.

He started his career in music as the owner/manager of venues in Newcastle upon Tyne in north east England; the Marimba coffee bar and the Downbeat jazz club. Eric Burdon of the Animals was a patron of the latter, which eventually became a beat music venue featuring local bands such as The Alan Price Combo (originally The Pagans and soon to be The Animals) as well as The Kylastrons and The Invaders.

After the club was closed due to fire regulations, both establishments burned down. Burdon has alleged that Jeffrey burnt down the Marimba for the insurance money. Jeffery then opened the Club A’Gogo in partnership with Ray Grehan, sales manager for the Automaticket company. The Club A'Gogo became Newcastle's most celebrated venue, particularly after it was the subject of a best-selling song by The Animals, who were the venue's house band (to be replaced by The Junco Partners when The Animals became an international act). The club hosted concerts by Captain Beefheart, Cream, Fleetwood Mac, The Graham Bond Organisation, Howlin’ Wolf, Jeff Beck, Jimi Hendrix, John Lee Hooker, John Mayall & the Bluesbreakers, Pink Floyd, The Rolling Stones, The Who and The Yardbirds among others. It attracted younger Newcastle clientele such as Sting and Bryan Ferry.

== The Animals ==
Jeffery contracted to manage The Animals and obtained a recording contract with Columbia, with the recordings to be produced by Mickie Most. After the success of their second record, "The House of the Rising Sun", the Animals embarked on a tour that spanned most of the US. Despite this success, Jeffery has been openly condemned by members of The Animals, who blame him for the breakup of the band, claiming that he worked the group into the ground and appropriated most of their earnings.

In 1968, Kevin Deverich took over as manager for Eric Burdon and the new Animals, when they became unhappy over money that was promised to them by Jeffery.

== Jimi Hendrix ==
When Chas Chandler decided to move into management himself and signed Jimi Hendrix, he needed financial support to launch The Jimi Hendrix Experience and so went into partnership with his old manager, with very mixed feelings. Jeffery thus became co-manager of the trio, taking care of business while Chandler produced.

It has been said that Jeffrey sabotaged Hendrix's group, The Band of Gypsys. He had an extreme dislike for band member Buddy Miles and wanted to re-form the Jimi Hendrix Experience. Miles accused Jeffrey of slipping LSD tablets to sabotage the group's performance. Miles was sacked and the group broke up soon after.

Jeffery has received almost unanimous criticism from Hendrix biographers. Jeffery siphoned off much of Hendrix's income and channelled it into off-shore bank accounts. When Experience bassist Noel Redding inquired as to where Jeffery was going with briefcases of the band's money, he was asked to leave the band.

In October 2006 a $15 million auction took place of items of Jeffery's estate including the rights to many of Jimi Hendrix's hits including "Purple Haze" and "Voodoo Child (Slight Return)". Experience Hendrix, a company formed and owned by Hendrix's family, have said they will prove they own the titles to these songs and that they intend to sue.

=== Hendrix death allegation ===
Hendrix was pronounced dead on 18 September 1970 at St. Mary Abbotts Hospital, Kensington, London. In May 2009, the UK media reported claims by James "Tappy" Wright that Jeffery had murdered him. Wright, who was a roadie for The Animals in the 1960s, had just written a book, in which he claimed he was with Jeffery in 1971, one year after Hendrix's death, and Jeffery confessed to having murdered Hendrix by plying him with pills and a bottle of wine in order to kill him and claim on the guitarist's life insurance. At the time of Hendrix's death, the coroner recorded an "open verdict", stating that the cause was "barbiturate intoxication and inhalation of vomit". The pathologist who did the autopsy on Hendrix, Donald Teare, reported a low blood alcohol level. "Jimi Hendrix was not murdered," says Bob Levine, who was the US manager of the late guitarist at the time of his death in 1970. "Despite the allegations that have recently been made, I need to set the record straight once and for all. Jimi died an accidental death, but he definitely wasn't murdered – not by Michael Jeffery, his UK manager, and certainly not by anybody connected to him. The whole thing is one giant lie."

== Death ==
Jeffery died in a mid-air collision over Nantes, France, on 5 March 1973, just eight days before his 40th birthday. He was buried in Hither Green Cemetery in Lewisham, southeast London.
