= The Jimi Hendrix Experience (album) =

Box set by the Jimi Hendrix Experience
- Released: September 12, 2000
- Recorded: 1966–1970
- Genre: Psychedelic rock
- Length: 259:55
- Label: MCA
- Compilers: Janie Hendrix; Eddie Kramer; John McDermott

The Jimi Hendrix Experience chronology
Morning Symphony Ideas (2000)	The Jimi Hendrix Experience (2000)	Voodoo Child: The Jimi Hendrix Collection (2001)

Professional ratings
Review scores
Source	Rating
AllMusic	4.5/5 stars
Rolling Stone	4.5/5 stars

The Jimi Hendrix Experience is a box set by the British-American rock band the Jimi Hendrix Experience, released in 2000 by MCA. The material includes alternative recordings, live performances and some rarities. Although most of the material had been released in earlier compilations, some previously unreleased material (such as live versions of "Killing Floor" and "The Wind Cries Mary") was also included.

The alternative recordings include some tracks from Hendrix's studio albums, including some from First Rays of the New Rising Sun. This list includes "Purple Haze", "Highway Chile", "Little Wing", "Gypsy Eyes", "Stone Free", among others. The live songs are taken from performances such as the Monterey Pop Festival, the Royal Albert Hall, and the Isle of Wight and includes a near-complete version of Hendrix in the West.

On some tracks, especially on those from Hendrix in the West, the recordings have been slightly altered to clean up the sound, but even when modifications were made the result does not differ too much from the original masterings.

Another edition of this boxed set was released on 28 November 2005, which, under the Universal music group label, included an exclusive bonus DVD featuring a 30-minute documentary called "Hendrix and the Blues", originally created as part of the Martin Scorsese Presents the Blues series. As well as this, this bonus DVD also includes several live tracks, including "Johnny B. Goode" which was recorded live at Berkeley Community Theatre, Berkeley, California on May 30. 1970, "Red House" and "In from the Storm", both of which were recorded live at Isle of Wight, England on August 30, 1970.

The set was re-issued with four bonus tracks in August 2013.

== Album cover ==
The cover shot is by Karl Ferris, whose photos were used for the US/Canada release of Are You Experienced, the basis of the small group airbrush painting used in the cover art for Axis: Bold as Love, and the US/Canada cover of Electric Ladyland, which became the official international cover from 1997.

== Track listing ==
All songs are written by Jimi Hendrix, except where noted.

=== Disc one ===
1. "Purple Haze"– 3:26
2. "Killing Floor (Live)" (Chester Arthur Burnett) – 3:05
3. "Hey Joe (Live)" (Billy Roberts) – 2:52
4. "Foxy Lady" – 3:27
5. "Highway Chile" – 3:40
6. "Hey Joe" (Roberts) – 3:06
7. "Title #3" – 2:12
8. "Third Stone from the Sun" – 9:18
9. "Taking Care of No Business" – 3:42
10. "Here He Comes (Lover Man)" – 3:02
11. "Burning of the Midnight Lamp" – 1:30
12. "If 6 Was 9" – 5:57
13. "Rock Me Baby (Live)" (Josea, B.B. King) – 3:20
14. "Like a Rolling Stone (Live)" (Bob Dylan) – 6:52
15. "Burning of the Midnight Lamp (Live)" – 3:58 (2013 re-issue bonus track)
16. "The Stars That Play With Laughing Sam's Dice" – 4:17 (2013 re-issue bonus track)
- Tracks 7 and 9 are previously unreleased recordings.
- Tracks 1, 4, 5, 6, 8, 10, 11 and 12 are previously unreleased alternate recordings.
- Tracks 2 and 3 recorded live at Olympia Theatre, Paris, France, October 18, 1966.
- Tracks 13 and 14 recorded live at the Monterey International Pop Festival, June 18, 1967.
- Track 15 recorded live at Dee Time, London, August 22, 1967.
- Track 16 is the original 1967 single mix.

=== Disc two ===
1. "Sgt. Pepper's Lonely Hearts Club Band (Live)" (Lennon–McCartney) – 1:51
2. "Burning of the Midnight Lamp (Live)" – 4:06
3. "Little Wing" – 3:23
4. "Little Miss Lover" – 2:21
5. "The Wind Cries Mary (Live)" – 4:11
6. "Catfish Blues (Live)" (Robert Petway) – 5:26
7. "Bold as Love" – 7:09
8. "Sweet Angel" – 4:12
9. "Fire (Live)" – 2:43
10. "Somewhere" – 3:48
11. "Have You Ever Been (To Electric Ladyland)" – 1:28
12. "Gypsy Eyes" – 3:43
13. "Room Full of Mirrors" – 1:26
14. "Gloria" (Van Morrison) – 8:53
15. "Peace in Mississippi" – 7:15 (2013 re-issue bonus track)
16. "It's Too Bad" – 8:52
17. "Star Spangled Banner" (Francis Scott Key, John Stafford Smith, arr. Hendrix) (Studio version) – 4:12
- Track 15 and 16 are previously unreleased recordings.
- Tracks 3, 4, 7, 8, 10, 11, 12, 13 and 14 are previously unreleased alternate recordings.
- Tracks 1 and 2 recorded live at Stockholm, Sweden, September 5, 1967.
- Tracks 5 and 6 recorded live at Olympia Theatre, Paris, France, October 9, 1967.
- Track 9 recorded live at Clark University, Worcester, Massachusetts, March 15, 1968.
- Track 17 originally issued as part of Rainbow Bridge.

=== Disc three ===
1. "Stone Free" – 3:43
2. "Like a Rolling Stone (Live)" (Bob Dylan) – 10:39 (2013 re-issue bonus track)
3. "Spanish Castle Magic" – 5:50
4. "Hear My Train A Comin'" – 6:58
5. "Room Full of Mirrors" – 7:56
6. "I Don't Live Today (Live)" – 6:33
7. "Little Wing (Live)" – 3:16
8. "Red House (Live)" – 13:07
9. "Purple Haze (Live)" – 4:03
10. "Voodoo Child (Slight Return) (Live)" – 7:53
11. "Izabella" – 3:40
- Tracks 1, 3, 4, 5 and 11 are previously unreleased alternate recordings.
- Track 2 recorded live at Winterland, San Francisco, California, October 10, 1968 (second show).
- Track 6 recorded live at Los Angeles Forum, California, April 26, 1969.
- Tracks 7 and 10 recorded live at the Royal Albert Hall, London, February 24, 1969.
- Tracks 8 and 9 recorded live at the San Diego Sports Arena, California, May 24, 1969.

=== Disc four ===
1. "Message to Love" – 3:35
2. "Earth Blues" – 4:08
3. "Astro Man" – 4:11
4. "Country Blues" – 8:27
5. "Freedom" – 3:52
6. "Johnny B. Goode (Live)" (Chuck Berry) – 4:46
7. "Lover Man" – 2:57
8. "Blue Suede Shoes (Live)" (Carl Perkins) – 4:28
9. "Cherokee Mist" – 6:02
10. "Come Down Hard on Me" – 3:18
11. "Hey Baby/In from the Storm (Live)" – 8:56
12. "Ezy Ryder" – 3:43
13. "Night Bird Flying" – 4:24
14. "All Along the Watchtower (Live)" (Bob Dylan) – 4:22
15. "In from the Storm (Live)" – 4:21
16. "Slow Blues" – 1:46
- Tracks 4, 7, 9 and 16 are previously unreleased recordings.
- Tracks 1, 2, 3, 5, 10, 12 and 13 are previously unreleased alternate recordings.
- Tracks 6 and 8 recorded live at Berkeley Community Theatre, Berkeley, California, May 30, 1970 (first show).
- Track 11 recorded live at Maui, Hawaii, July 30, 1970.
- Tracks 14 and 15 recorded live at the Isle of Wight, England, August 30, 1970.

== Charts ==
Chart (2015)	Peak position
Belgian Albums (Ultratop Flanders)	196
Belgian Albums (Ultratop Wallonia)	178
Dutch Albums (Album Top 100)	79
