= Alan Douglas (music producer) =

American record producer (1931–2014)

Alan Douglas Rubenstein (July 20, 1931 – June 7, 2014) was an American record producer from Boston, who worked with Jimi Hendrix, Miles Davis, John McLaughlin, Lenny Bruce and the Last Poets. He ran his own record label, Douglas Records.

== Early life ==
Douglas was born Alan Douglas Rubenstein in Chelsea, Massachusetts, the son of Rose (Silbert) and William Rubenstein, a junk seller and later mattress manufacturer. His parents were Russian Jewish immigrants. His brother was actor Jerry Douglas.

== Jazz record producer ==
In 1962, Douglas took charge of United Artists Records' jazz division. One of his first projects was Art Blakey and the Jazz Messengers' Three Blind Mice albums, recorded live at the Renaissance Club in Hollywood. He also coaxed trumpeter Kenny Dorham into the studio for Matador, a soul-jazz classic shared with Jackie McLean and Bobby Timmons. Douglas's qualities as a producer were already evident. He encouraged musicians to express themselves and push the boundaries, as when he teamed Duke Ellington with Max Roach and Charles Mingus for Money Jungle, which George Wein has described as “one of the greatest piano trio recordings in jazz history."

Douglas produced other memorable releases during his short tenure with UA, including albums by Oliver Nelson, Ken McIntyre, King Pleasure, Herbie Mann, and Betty Carter. The Bill Evans and Jim Hall LP Undercurrent was the first of their collaborations. Highlights from these albums can be found on Douglas On Blue Note, issued in 2009.

== Connection with Jimi Hendrix and others ==
Douglas first crossed paths with Hendrix shortly after the latter's performance at Woodstock in 1969, and it was supposedly through Douglas that Hendrix met and began jamming with jazz musicians, including Miles Davis, Quincy Jones, and Gil Evans, as well as hip hop trailblazers the Last Poets. In the book Ultimate Hendrix: An Illustrated Encyclopedia of Live Concerts and Sessions, Buddy Miles credits Douglas with helping put together the Band of Gypsys band, as he was quoted as saying, "The Band of Gypsys were put together in Douglas's office, between Alan and [concert promoter] Bill Graham, who gave us the dates at the Fillmore East." However, in the book Hendrix: Setting the Record Straight, former Hendrix producer Chas Chandler is quoted as saying, "Hendrix said to me – and I remember the sentence . . . 'He [Douglas] can help [in business matters] . . . but I don’t want that guy to have anything to do with my music'." Douglas attended Hendrix's funeral in 1970, and four years after Hendrix's death, Douglas acquired the rights to produce music that Hendrix had never released.

Douglas's production work on a few of Hendrix's posthumous releases is controversial. This is primarily due to tracks on the Crash Landing and Midnight Lightning LP releases in 1975. On these releases Douglas replaced the original drum and bass tracks and added guitar overdubs newly recorded by session musicians. He added female backing singers to one track, and claimed co-composer credit on several tracks that he had altered. On the much later Voodoo Soup compilation album Douglas is known to have wiped original drum tracks on two songs and replaced them with The Knack's Bruce Gary. Second, on the 1993 CD releases of Hendrix's three studio albums, the original album artwork and packaging were scrapped in favour of new renderings of the Jimi Hendrix Experience.

Douglas's work on Hendrix releases was defended by rock journalist and critic John Masouri, who in 2001 called him "one of the last great musical visionaries", and said he had been right to try to improve the original tracks: "wisely he'd also edited out passages where Jimi had toyed with a riff repeatedly, searching for just the right phrase... All things considered, it's highly unlikely that Hendrix would have sanctioned the release of poorly executed material, yet the die was cast, and the producer has been branded a controversial figure ever since." Supposedly, Jimi Hendrix Experience drummer Mitch Mitchell also approved of Douglas's decision to utilize sessions musicians on Hendrix releases, because "some of the original playing had been sub-standard."

However, in interviews, guitarist John McLaughlin has criticized Douglas's handling of his own LP Devotion (1970), as well, closely related to Hendrix's Band of Gypsys sessions. But Umar Bin Hassan, a member of the Last Poets, said following Douglas's death that "whether you liked him or didn't, you had to admit that he was one of the giants in what he did, which was to put out responsible, intelligent and remarkable music." Douglas was credited with being the first record producer to record a hip hop album after he recorded Jimi Hendrix (bass and guitar), Buddy Miles and Jalal Mansur Nuriddin (as Lightnin' Rod) of The Last Poets in 1969 on a rap song named Doriella du Fontaine (only released in 1986).

In 1995, Douglas lost control of the Hendrix archive to Hendrix's father, Al. After years of legal wrangling, Douglas was able to obtain the right to compile Hendrix's writings into a book, Starting At Zero, which was published in late 2013. He was also planning a documentary film of the same title which remained unreleased at the time of his death.

== Death ==
Douglas died at his home in Paris, France, on June 7, 2014, of complications after a fall. He was married four times, and had two daughters and a stepson.
