= The Essential Jimi Hendrix =

Compilation album by Jimi Hendrix
- Released: July 1978
- Recorded: 1966–1970
- Genre: Rock
- Length: 84:28
- Label: Polydor (international); Reprise (US)

Jimi Hendrix US album chronology
Jimi Hendrix vol. 2 (1976)	The Essential Jimi Hendrix (1978)	The Essential Jimi Hendrix Volume Two (1979)

Jimi Hendrix UK album chronology
Midnight Lightning (1975)	The Essential Jimi Hendrix (1978)	Nine to the Universe (1980)

Alternative cover
- UK cover

The Essential Jimi Hendrix is a compilation album of songs by American rock musician Jimi Hendrix, released in 1978 by Reprise Records. Some editions in the UK, Japan and Italy also contained a 7-inch 33 1/3 rpm one-sided EP single of the Jimi Hendrix Experience performing the song "Gloria".

In 1989, the album was combined with the follow-up compilation, The Essential Jimi Hendrix Volume Two, and issued on compact disc as The Essential Jimi Hendrix Volumes One and Two.

Professional ratings
Review scores
Source	Rating
Christgau's Record Guide	C+

== Track listing ==
=== LP/Cassette version (1978) ===
All tracks are written by Jimi Hendrix, except "All Along the Watchtower", by Bob Dylan.

Side one
No.	Title	Original release	Length
1.	"Are You Experienced?"	Are You Experienced? (1967)	4:07
2.	"Third Stone From the Sun"	Are You Experienced?	6:37
3.	"Purple Haze"	Single A-side / Are You Experienced? (U.S. Version)	2:47
4.	"Little Wing"	Axis: Bold as Love (1967)	2:24
5.	"If 6 Was 9"	Axis: Bold as Love	5:32
Total length:			21:27

Side two
No.	Title	Original release	Length
1.	"Bold as Love"	Axis: Bold as Love	4:08
2.	"Little Miss Lover"	Axis: Bold as Love	2:20
3.	"Castles Made of Sand"	Axis: Bold as Love	2:45
4.	"Gypsy Eyes"	Electric Ladyland (1968)	3:39
5.	"Burning of the Midnight Lamp"	Electric Ladyland	3:35
6.	"Voodoo Chile (Slight Return)"	Electric Ladyland	5:08
Total length:			21:35

Side three
No.	Title	Original release	Length
1.	"Have You Ever Been (To Electric Ladyland)"	Electric Ladyland	2:11
2.	"Still Raining, Still Dreaming"	Electric Ladyland	4:22
3.	"House Burning Down"	Electric Ladyland	4:33
4.	"All Along the Watchtower" (Bob Dylan)	Electric Ladyland	4:00
5.	"Room Full of Mirrors"	Rainbow Bridge (1971)	3:16
6.	"Izabella"	War Heroes (1972)	2:51
Total length:			21:13

Side four
No.	Title	Original release	Length
1.	"Freedom"	The Cry of Love (1971)	3:24
2.	"Dolly Dagger"	Rainbow Bridge	4:43
3.	"Stepping Stone"	War Heroes	4:11
4.	"Drifting"	The Cry of Love	3:46
5.	"Ezy Ryder"	The Cry of Love	4:09
Total length:			20:13

Bonus 7-inch EP
No.	Title	Original release	Length
1.	"Gloria" (Van Morrison)	Previously unreleased	8:47

=== CD version (1989) ===
All tracks are written by Jimi Hendrix, except where otherwise noted.

Disc one
No.	Title	Original release	Length
1.	"Are You Experienced?"	Are You Experienced? (1967)	4:07
2.	"Third Stone From the Sun"	Are You Experienced?	6:37
3.	"Purple Haze"	Single A-side / Are You Experienced? (U.S. Version)	2:47
4.	"Hey Joe" (Billy Roberts)	Single A-side / Are You Experienced? (U.S. Version)	3:25
5.	"Fire"	Are You Experienced?	2:41
6.	"Foxey Lady"	Are You Experienced?	3:15
7.	"The Wind Cries Mary"	Single A-side / Are You Experienced? (U.S. Version)	3:15
8.	"I Don't Live Today"	Are You Experienced?	3:49
9.	"Little Wing"	Axis: Bold as Love (1967)	2:24
10.	"If 6 Was 9"	Axis: Bold as Love	5:32
11.	"Bold as Love"	Axis: Bold as Love	4:08
12.	"Little Miss Lover"	Axis: Bold as Love	2:20
13.	"Castles Made of Sand"	Axis: Bold as Love	2:45
14.	"Gypsy Eyes"	Electric Ladyland (1968)	3:39
15.	"Burning of the Midnight Lamp"	Electric Ladyland	3:35
16.	"Voodoo Chile (Slight Return)"	Electric Ladyland	5:08
17.	"Crosstown Traffic"	Electric Ladyland	2:17
18.	"Still Raining, Still Dreaming"	Electric Ladyland	4:22
Total length:			66:06

Disc two
No.	Title	Original release	Length
1.	"Have You Ever Been (To Electric Ladyland)"	Electric Ladyland	2:11
2.	"All Along the Watchtower" (Bob Dylan)	Electric Ladyland	4:00
3.	"House Burning Down"	Electric Ladyland	4:33
4.	"Room Full of Mirrors"	Rainbow Bridge (1971)	3:16
5.	"Izabella"	War Heroes (1972)	2:51
6.	"Freedom"	The Cry of Love (1971)	3:24
7.	"Dolly Dagger"	Rainbow Bridge	4:43
8.	"Stepping Stone"	War Heroes	4:11
9.	"Drifting"	The Cry of Love	3:46
10.	"Ezy Ryder"	The Cry of Love	4:09
11.	"Wild Thing" (Chip Taylor)	Live at the Monterey Pop Festival, Monterey, California, June 18, 1967	6:44
12.	"Machine Gun"	Live at Fillmore East, New York City, January 1, 1970; released on Band of Gypsys (1970)	12:09
13.	"The Star-Spangled Banner" (trad.arr. Hendrix)	Live at the Woodstock Festival, Bethel, New York, August 18, 1969; released on Woodstock: Music from the Original Soundtrack and More (1970)	3:45
14.	"Gloria" (Van Morrison)	Bonus 7-inch single included with some vinyl editions	8:47
Total length:			68:29 02:14:35

== Personnel ==
- Jimi Hendrix – guitar, vocals
- Noel Redding – bass guitar, backing vocals
- Mitch Mitchell – drums
- Buddy Miles – drums on "Still Raining, Still Dreaming", "Room Full of Mirrors", "Ezy Ryder", "Machine Gun"
- Billy Cox – bass guitar on "Room Full of Mirrors", "Izabella", "Freedom", "Dolly Dagger", "Stepping Stone", "Drifting", "Ezy Ryder", "Machine Gun"
