= Jimi Hendrix (album) =

Compilation album by Jimi Hendrix
- Released: March 1975
- Recorded: 1966–1970
- Genre: Rock
- Length: 47:26
- Label: Polydor

Jimi Hendrix UK album chronology
Loose Ends (1974)	Jimi Hendrix (1975)	Crash Landing (1975)

Professional ratings
Review scores
Source	Rating
AllMusic	3/5 stars

Jimi Hendrix is a compilation album of songs by American rock musician Jimi Hendrix, released in 1975 by Polydor Records. It charted at number 35 in the UK albums chart. It was followed in 1976 by Jimi Hendrix vol. 2.

== Track listing ==
All tracks are written by Jimi Hendrix, except "Johnny B. Goode," by Chuck Berry, "All Along the Watchtower" and "The Drifter's Escape" by Bob Dylan.

Side one
No.	Title	Original release	Length
1.	"Voodoo Chile (Slight Return)"	Electric Ladyland (1968)	5:06
2.	"Ezy Ryder"	The Cry of Love (1971)	4:09
3.	"Little Wing"	Axis: Bold as Love (1967)	2:24
4.	"Love or Confusion"	Are You Experienced (1967)	3:05
5.	"House Burning Down"	Electric Ladyland	4:26
6.	"Johnny B. Goode"	Hendrix in the West (1972)	4:45
Total length:			23:55

Side two
No.	Title	Original release	Length
1.	"All Along the Watchtower"	Electric Ladyland	3:54
2.	"Little Miss Lover"	Axis: Bold as Love	2:20
3.	"Power to Love"	Band of Gypsys (1970)	6:55
4.	"The Drifter's Escape"	Loose Ends (1974)	3:02
5.	"Angel"	The Cry of Love	4:25
6.	"Izabella"	War Heroes(1972)	2:55
Total length:			23:31

== Personnel ==
- Jimi Hendrix – guitar, vocals, bass guitar on "House Burning Down", "All Along the Watchtower"
- Noel Redding – bass guitar on Voodoo Chile (Slight Return), "Little Wing", "Love or Confusion", "Little Miss Lover", backing vocals
- Mitch Mitchell – drums
- Buddy Miles – drums on "Ezy Ryder", "Power to Love"
- Billy Cox – bass guitar on "Ezy Ryder", "Johnny B. Goode", "Power to Love", "The Drifter's Escape", "Angel", "Izabella",
- Billy Armstrong – percussion on "Ezy Ryder"
- Steve Winwood – backing vocals on "Ezy Ryder"
- Chris Wood – backing vocals on "Ezy Ryder"
- Brian Jones – percussion on "All Along the Watchtower"
