= Blues (Jimi Hendrix album) =

Compilation album by Jimi Hendrix
- Released: April 26, 1994
- Recorded: 1966–1970
- Genre: Blues, blues rock
- Length: 72:17
- Label: MCA - Polydor
- Compiler: Alan Douglas, Bruce Gary

Jimi Hendrix chronology
The Ultimate Experience (1992)	Blues (1994)	Woodstock (1994)

Blues (stylized as :blues) is a compilation album of blues songs recorded by American singer/songwriter/musician Jimi Hendrix. Compiled by interim Hendrix producer Alan Douglas, it was released April 26, 1994, by MCA Records. The album contains eleven songs recorded by Hendrix between 1966 and 1970, six of which were previously unreleased. Hendrix wrote seven of the pieces; other writers include Muddy Waters, Booker T. Jones, and Elmore James. Most are demos, jams, and live recordings, which Hendrix may or may not have completed for release.

Upon its release, Blues was met with favorable reviews and chart successes, selling over 500,000 copies in its first two years of release. On February 6, 2001, Blues was certified platinum in sales by the Recording Industry Association of America. The album was re-released by Experience Hendrix Records in 1998, following the Hendrix family's acquisition of the musician's recordings, and again in October 2010, as part of the project to remaster Hendrix's discography.

== Music ==
The opening song "Hear My Train A Comin'" (frequently referred to by Hendrix as "Getting My Heart Back Together Again") was recorded at Bruce Fleming Photography Studio, London, on December 19, 1967. A Hendrix original, it was from a long lost master tape of Hendrix alone playing a 12-string acoustic right-hand guitar, strung for left hand and singing in a Delta blues manner. This live studio performance was filmed for, and included in, the film See My Music Talking, and later included in the 1973 documentary Jimi Hendrix and accompanying soundtrack LP. Hendrix often played an electric version in concert. The last song on Blues is a live version of "Hear My Train A Comin'", recorded on May 30, 1970, at the Berkeley Community Theatre, that had previously been released on the posthumous Rainbow Bridge album in 1971.

"Born Under a Bad Sign" is an instrumental jam of the Albert King number written by Booker T. Jones and William Bell (performed by Band of Gypsys). "Red House" is the original, mono take from the European version of Are You Experienced, but without some of the outro chat (previously unavailable in US and Canada). Another take, in stereo, from a different session was released on the US version of the 1969 compilation album Smash Hits. On this version, Redding plays electric guitar tuned down to resemble a bass. "Catfish Blues" is from the Dutch TV show Hoepla, recorded in November 1967. Hendrix uses the first two verses from Muddy Waters' "Rollin’ Stone" (which is based on older versions usually with "Catfish" in the title) and the last verse is from Muddy's "Still a Fool" itself based on "Roll and Tumble Blues" by Hambone Willie Newbern.

"Catfish Blues"
28 seconds of live performance (1967)

"Voodoo Chile Blues" is another creation of Alan Douglas, recorded during the sessions that produced the finished track, "Voodoo Chile", for the critically acclaimed Electric Ladyland album. This track is made from two different takes of the song that were edited and joined together to make one consistent track. "Mannish Boy" is actually a hybrid of Muddy Waters' "Mannish Boy" and Bo Diddley's "I'm a Man". It is also an edited studio creation that combines several takes. "Once I Had a Woman" is a slightly longer edited version of a song recorded at the Record Plant in New York City on January 23, 1970, with Buddy Miles on drums and Billy Cox on bass guitar. The band starts to jam during the second half of the long song and then a fade out follows. "Bleeding Heart" is a cover of the Elmore James number, performed here by Band of Gypsys. "Jelly 292" is actually take 2 of the song "Jam 292" (the name on the tape box) which appeared on the 1974 European-only LP Loose Ends. It is an uptempo jam based on Duke Ellington's "Dooji Wooji". "Electric Church Red House" is a jam from TTG Studios in Los Angeles featuring a group introduction by Hendrix (lifted from another, different jam at TTG) and Lee Michaels on organ.

== Critical reception ==
Professional ratings
Review scores
Source	Rating
AllMusic	4/5 stars
Blender	4/5 stars
Entertainment Weekly	A
NME	8/10
The Rolling Stone Album Guide	3.5/5 stars
Tom Hull – on the Web	A−
The Village Voice	A−

In a 1994 review, Rolling Stone magazine was impressed by how Blues showcased Hendrix's ability to pay homage to his influences but also transcend them, while NME said the compilation of lengthy blues jams was distinguished by his "definitive" style of electric blues and the digital remastering quality.

Writing for AllMusic, Richie Unterberger said the songs showed "the master guitarist stretching the boundaries of electric blues in both live and studio settings." Village Voice critic Robert Christgau believed the ordinary blues concept and track selection were conducive to Hendrix's unique and eclectic style. He later wrote of Hendrix's blues legacy in Blender:

Though it's reductionist to define Hendrix as a bluesman just because he was black, he melded Chicago blues and country blues and interplanetary blues and bent blues like a supernatural. His sound was even thicker than mentor Albert King's, yet it could get as fanciful as prime Skip James.

== Track listing ==
Details taken from the original MCA CD notes; other sources may show different information.

All tracks are written by Jimi Hendrix, except where noted.

Blues
No.	Title	Recorded	Length
1.	"Hear My Train A Comin'" (live solo acoustic from 1968 Experience documentary)	12/19/67 at Bruce Fleming Photo Studio, London	3:05
2.	"Born Under a Bad Sign" (Booker T. Jones, William Bell)	12/15/69 at Record Plant, New York City	7:37
3.	"Red House" (original UK Are You Experienced version)	12/13/66 at CBS Studios, London	3:41
4.	"Catfish Blues" (live, trad. arr. Hendrix)	11/10/67 at Vitus Studios, Bussum, Netherlands	7:46
5.	"Voodoo Chile Blues" (outtake)	5/2/68 at Record Plant, New York City	8:47
6.	"Mannish Boy" (Muddy Waters, Mel London, Ellas McDaniel)	4/22/69 at Record Plant, New York City	5:21
7.	"Once I Had a Woman"	1/23/70 at Record Plant, New York City	7:49
8.	"Bleeding Heart" (Elmore James, arr. Hendrix; War Heroes contains a different version)	3/18/69 at Record Plant, New York City	3:26
9.	"Jelly 292" (credited as "Jam 292" on Loose Ends)	5/14/69 at Record Plant, New York City	6:25
10.	"Electric Church Red House" (composite of two jams)	10/29/68 at TTG Studios, Hollywood	6:12
11.	"Hear My Train A Comin'" (live from 1971 Rainbow Bridge album)	5/30/70 at Berkeley Community Theatre, California	12:08

== Chart history ==
- Billboard (United States) – Blues
  - 1994: Billboard 200 – No. 45
  - 1994: Top R&B/Hip-Hop Albums – No. 38
  - 1995: Top Blues Albums – No. 4
- UK Albums Chart
  - 1994: No. 10

== Personnel ==
Musicians

- Jimi Hendrix – guitars, vocals
- Billy Cox – bass guitar on "Born Under a Bad Sign", "Mannish Boy", "Once I Had a Woman", "Bleeding Heart", "Jelly 292" and "Hear My Train a Comin'" (Berkeley)
- Noel Redding – bass on "Red House", "Catfish Blues" and "Electric Church Red House"
- Mitch Mitchell – drums on "Red House", "Catfish Blues", "Voodoo Chile Blues", "Jelly 292", "Electric Church Red House" and "Hear My Train a Comin'" (Berkeley)
- Buddy Miles – drums on "Born Under a Bad Sign", "Mannish Boy", "Once I Had a Woman", "Bleeding Heart"
- Jack Casady – bass on "Voodoo Chile Blues"
- Steve Winwood – organ on "Voodoo Chile Blues"
- Sharon Layne – piano on "Jelly 292"
- Lee Michaels – organ on "Electric Church Red House"

Additional personnel

- Alan Douglas – production
- Bruce Gary – production
- Mark Linett – engineering
- Joe Gastwirt – mastering
- Rob O'Connor – artwork, design
- Richard Bull – artwork, design
- Michael J. Fairchild – liner notes
