= The Essential Jimi Hendrix Volume Two =

The Essential Jimi Hendrix (Vol. 2)

Compilation album by Jimi Hendrix
- Released: July 1979
- Recorded: 1966–1970
- Genre: Rock
- Length: 41:20
- Label: Polydor (international); Reprise (US)

Jimi Hendrix US album chronology
The Essential Jimi Hendrix (1978)	The Essential Jimi Hendrix (Vol. 2) (1979)	Nine to the Universe (1980)

Jimi Hendrix UK album chronology
Nine to the Universe (1980)	The Essential Jimi Hendrix (Vol. 2) (1981)	Stone Free (1981)

The Essential Jimi Hendrix Volume Two is a compilation album of songs by American rock musician Jimi Hendrix, released in 1979 by Reprise Records. It is the follow-up album to The Essential Jimi Hendrix, released by Reprise the previous year.

Some editions in the US, Canada and Italy also contained a 7-inch 33 1/3 rpm one-sided EP single of the Jimi Hendrix Experience performing the song "Gloria", which had first been issued with some editions of the first Essential release in the UK, Japan and Italy.

In 1989, the album was combined with its predecessor, The Essential Jimi Hendrix, and issued on compact disc as The Essential Jimi Hendrix Volumes One and Two.

Professional ratings
Review scores
Source	Rating
AllMusic	3/5 stars
Christgau's Record Guide	B−

== Track listing ==
All tracks are written by Jimi Hendrix, except where otherwise noted.

Side one
No.	Title	Original release	Length
1.	"Hey Joe" (Billy Roberts)	Single A-side; Are You Experienced? (U.S. Version) (1967)	3:25
2.	"Fire"	Are You Experienced?	2:41
3.	"Foxy Lady"	Are You Experienced?	3:15
4.	"The Wind Cries Mary"	Single A-side; Are You Experienced? (U.S. Version)	3:15
5.	"I Don't Live Today"	Are You Experienced?	3:49
6.	"Crosstown Traffic"	Electric Ladyland (1968)	2:17
Total length:			18:42

Side two
No.	Title	Original release	Length
1.	"Wild Thing" (Chip Taylor)	Live at the Monterey Pop Festival, Monterey, California, June 18, 1967	6:44
2.	"Machine Gun"	Live at Fillmore East, New York City, January 1, 1970; released on Band of Gypsys (1970)	12:09
3.	"The Star Spangled Banner" (trad.arr. Hendrix)	Live at the Woodstock Festival, Bethel, New York, August 18, 1969; released on Woodstock: Music from the Original Soundtrack and More (1970)	3:45
Total length:			22:38

Bonus 7-inch EP
No.	Title	Original release	Length
1.	"Gloria" (Van Morrison)	Included with some editions of The Essential Jimi Hendrix in the UK, Japan and Italy.	8:47

- The U.S. cassette edition includes "Gloria" as track six on side one and shifts "Crosstown Traffic" to track one on side two.

== Personnel ==
- Jimi Hendrix – guitar, vocals
- Noel Redding – bass guitar, backing vocals
- Mitch Mitchell – drums
- Buddy Miles – drums on "Machine Gun"
- Billy Cox – bass guitar on "Machine Gun", "Star Spangled Banner"
