= Jimi Hendrix vol. 2 =

Compilation album by Jimi Hendrix
- Released: October 1976
- Recorded: 1966–1970
- Genre: Rock
- Length: 49:01
- Label: Polydor

Jimi Hendrix UK album chronology
Midnight Lightning (1975)	Jimi Hendrix vol. 2 (1976)	The Essential Jimi Hendrix (1978)

Professional ratings
Review scores
Source	Rating
AllMusic	3/5 stars

Jimi Hendrix Vol. 2 is a compilation album of songs by American rock musician Jimi Hendrix, released in 1976 by Polydor Records. It was a follow up to the 1975 compilation album Jimi Hendrix.

== Track listing ==
All tracks are written by Jimi Hendrix.

Side one
No.	Title	Original release	Length
1.	"Freedom"	The Cry of Love (1971)	3:24
2.	"Gypsy Eyes"	Electric Ladyland (1968)	3:38
3.	"Remember"	Are You Experienced (1966)	2:43
4.	"Castles Made of Sand"	Axis Bold as Love (1967)	2:46
5.	"Stone Free"	Stone Free Single (1966)	3:36
6.	"Straight Ahead"	The Cry of Love	4:42
7.	"Red House"	Are You Experienced	3:45
Total length:			24:34

Side two
No.	Title	Original release	Length
1.	"In From the Storm"	The Cry of Love	3:42
2.	"I Don't Live Today"	Are You Experienced	3:48
3.	"Cross Town Traffic"	Electric Ladyland	2:25
4.	"Are You Experienced"	Are You Experienced	4:02
5.	"Spanish Castle Magic"	Axis: Bold as Love	3:00
6.	"Long Hot Summer Night"	Electric Ladyland	3:21
7.	"Bold as Love"	Axis: Bold as Love	4:09
Total length:			24:27 48:01

== Personnel ==
- Jimi Hendrix – guitar, vocals, bass guitar on "Gypsy Eyes"
- Noel Redding – bass guitar
- Mitch Mitchell – drums
- Billy Cox – bass guitar on "Freedom", "Straight Ahead", "In From the Storm"
- Juma Sultan – percussion on "Freedom"
