= Reuben Jackson =

American poet and jazz historian (died 2024)

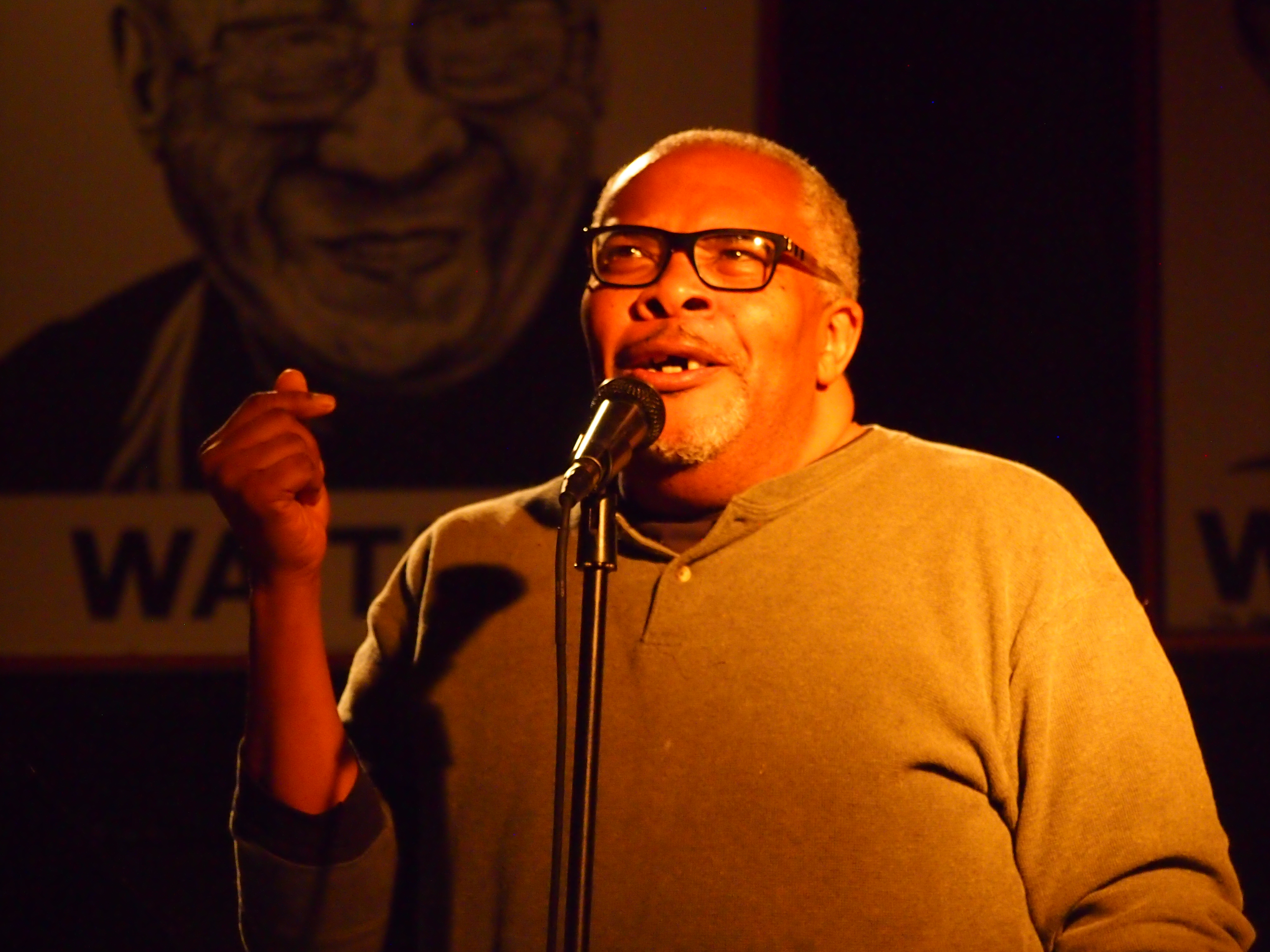
Jackson in 2018

Reuben Jackson (October 1, 1956 – February 16, 2024) was an American poet, educator, jazz historian, and music reviewer.

== Early life and education ==
Jackson was born in Augusta, Georgia on October 1, 1956. He grew up in the Brightwood neighborhood of Northwest Washington D.C. he attended Western High School, now known as the Duke Ellington School of the Arts. He graduated from Goddard College in 1978. He learned about the college while reading The Saturday Evening Post while bored at a party. He then received a MA in library science from the University of the District of Columbia.

== Career ==
Jackson started working for the Smithsonian museum in the gift shop of the National Air and Space Museum.

From 1989 to 2009, he was the curator of the Duke Ellington Collection at the Smithsonian Institution. He retired in 2009. After his retirement, he moved to Vermont where he taught high school English and lead poetry workshops at Goddard. From 2012 to 2018, he was the host of Friday Night Jazz on Vermont Public Radio. He returned to Washington to work as a jazz archivist at the University of the District of Columbia. Jackson was a mentor with The Young Writers Project, where he served on the Board since 2020. He co-hosted a radio program, The Sound of Surprise, on WPFW in Washington, D.C., alternating Sunday shows with the show's founder, Larry Appelbaum.

== Personal life ==
Jackson died on February 16, 2024 in Washington at the age of 67. He had suffered a stroke on February 2, hours after completing his show at WPFW.

== Works ==
- Fingering the Keys (Gut Punch Press, 1990)
- Scattered Clouds: New & Selected Poems (Alan Squire Publishing/Sante Fe Writer's Project, 2019)
- My Specific Awe and Wonder: Poems (Rootstock Publishing, 2024)
