= Nine to the Universe =

Compilation album by Jimi Hendrix
- Released: March 1980
- Recorded: March–May, August 1969
- Studio: Record Plant & The Hit Factory, New York City
- Genre: Progressive R&B; jazz fusion
- Length: 38:57
- Label: Polydor (UK); Reprise (US)
- Producer: Alan Douglas

Jimi Hendrix US album chronology
The Essential Jimi Hendrix Volume Two (1979)	Nine to the Universe (1980)	The Jimi Hendrix Concerts (1982)

Jimi Hendrix UK album chronology
The Essential Jimi Hendrix (1978)	Nine to the Universe (1980)	The Essential Jimi Hendrix Volume Two (1981)

Nine to the Universe is a posthumous compilation album by American guitarist Jimi Hendrix. It was released in March 1980 in the US and in June 1980 in the UK. It was the third album of Hendrix recordings to be produced by Alan Douglas.

The album contains five jam sessions, edited by Douglas. It reached number 127 on the Billboard 200 chart. Although the album has never been reissued or released on compact disc, four of the tracks have been re-released without Douglas's edits.

== Recording ==
Nine to the Universe is the third posthumous compilation Hendrix release produced by Alan Douglas. The tracks were recorded between March and August 1969 at the Record Plant and The Hit Factory in New York City. Unlike his previous efforts, Douglas mostly retained the original backing tracks and musicians. However, he came up with the titles, since Hendrix did not give names to these jams. One instrumental was titled "Young/Hendrix", after organist Larry Young and another "Jimi/Jimmy Jam", after guitarist Jim McCarty.

Bassist Dave Holland commented: "I'm not quite sure why I was called, but I was real happy to do it. It was a lot of fun and very informal. Nothing was really planned ... It was real loose, and Jimi seemed as if he was putting it together as he went". McCarty added: "None of that stuff was ever intended to be released ... To me it was embarrassing. I'm sure that Jimi would have said, 'You're out of your fucking mind!' and never let it happen. It was all about people trying to make a buck off of Jimi Hendrix."

== Release ==
Reprise Records released the album in March 1980 in the US, where it reached number 127 on the Billboard 200 album chart In June 1980, Polydor Records issued it in the UK, but it did not chart. The album has not been re-released, but most of the songs have been reissued on various Hendrix compilations, without Douglas's edits. According to Hendrix biographer Harry Shapiro, WEA released the album in 1979 in Brazil with a different cover and sequencing.

== Critical reception ==
In a contemporary review for The Village Voice, music critic Robert Christgau gave Nine to the Universe a "B+" and called it "bracing progressive R&B" showcasing Hendrix's most jazz-oriented improvisations. However, he questioned "whether tighter structures wouldn't have made [Hendrix] think harder and faster", while finding that Young, being the only jazz musician, sounded less "far out" than usual. Paul Evans gave it three-and-a-half out of five stars in The Rolling Stone Album Guide (1992) and said the ethics of Douglas' production were questionable but resulted in a fusion style in which Hendrix "sounds great", citing the album as the most "vital" of the Douglas-produced records. According to music scholar Craig Hansen Werner, along with Miles Davis' "Right Off" (1971) and the Sonny Sharrock albums Guitar (1986) and Seize the Rainbow (1987), Nine to the Universe was one of the few works that suggested the direction Hendrix and Davis would have explored had they worked together.

== Track listing ==
All tracks are written by Jimi Hendrix.

Side one
No.	Title	Post-Douglas release(s)	Length
1.	"Nine to the Universe"		8:45
2.	"Jimi/Jimmy Jam"	Hear My Music	8:04
Total length:			16:49

Side two
No.	Title	Post-Douglas release(s)	Length
1.	"Young/Hendrix"	West Coast Seattle Boy	10:22
2.	"Easy Blues"	People, Hell and Angels	4:30
3.	"Drone Blues"	Hear My Music	6:16
Total length:			21:08 37:57

== Personnel ==
- Jimi Hendrix – lead and rhythm guitar all tracks, lead vocals on track 1 (wiped)
- Larry Lee – rhythm guitar on track 4 (his guitar solo was removed)
- Jim McCarty – lead & rhythm guitar on track 2
- Larry Young – organ on track 3
- Billy Cox – bass guitar on tracks 1, 4 & 5
- Dave Holland – bass on track 3
- Roland Robinson – bass on track 2
- Mitch Mitchell – drums on tracks 2 & 4
- Buddy Miles – drums on tracks 1 & 3
- Rocky Isaac – drums on track 5
- Al Marks – percussion on track 5
- Juma Sultan – percussion on track 4 (mixed down)
- Gerardo Velez – percussion on track 4 (mixed down)
- Unknown – tambourine on track 4 (not on the original recording)
- Devon Wilson – backing vocals on track 1 (wiped)

== Recording details ==
Track	Location and recording date
Track 1	Record Plant, New York City on May 22, 1969
Track 2	Record Plant on March 25, 1969
Track 3	Record Plant on April 14, 1969
Track 4	The Hit Factory, New York City on August 28, 1969
Track 5	Record Plant on April 24, 1969
