= Crash Landing (Jimi Hendrix album) =

Compilation album by Jimi Hendrix
- Released: March 1975
- Recorded: 1968–1970; 1974 (overdubs)
- Genre: Rock
- Length: 29:34
- Labels: Polydor (UK); Reprise (US); RTB (Yugoslavia)
- Producers: Alan Douglas, Tony Bongiovi

Jimi Hendrix UK album chronology
Jimi Hendrix (1975)	Crash Landing (1975)	Midnight Lightning (1975)

Professional ratings
Review scores
Source	Rating
AllMusic	2.5/5 stars
Christgau's Record Guide	B+

Crash Landing is a posthumous compilation album by American guitarist Jimi Hendrix. It was released in March and August 1975 in the US and the UK respectively. It was the first Hendrix album to be produced by Alan Douglas.

== Background ==
Before Hendrix died in 1970, he was in the final stages of preparing what he intended to be a double studio LP, which was given various titles such as 'First Rays of the New Rising Sun', 'People, Hell & Angels', and 'Strate Ahead' [sic]. Most of the tracks intended for this album were spread out over three posthumous single LP releases: The Cry of Love (1971), Rainbow Bridge (1971), and War Heroes (1972). In the case of the last two of these LPs, a demo track, a live track, and unreleased studio tracks were used to fill out the releases. In late 1973, his international label prepared to issue an LP titled Loose Ends which contained eight tracks, six of which were generally regarded as incomplete or substandard (the only two "finished" tracks on this release were "The Stars That Play with Laughing Sam's Dice", a heavily re-mixed stereo version of the B-side which had been released in the original mono mix on the 1968 European and Japanese versions of the Smash Hits, and a cover of Bob Dylan's "The Drifter's Escape", both of which would ultimately be re-released on the South Saturn Delta CD in 1997). Loose Ends was not released in the USA by Reprise because they considered the quality of the tracks to be subpar.

Hendrix had amassed a great deal of time in the studio in 1969 and 1970, resulting in a substantial number of songs, some close to completion, that were available for potential release. After the death of Hendrix, his manager in 1973, Alan Douglas was hired to evaluate hundreds of hours of remaining material that was not used on earlier posthumous albums. "Peace in Mississippi", "Somewhere", and "Stone Free" were recorded with the original Jimi Hendrix Experience line up, while the rest of the material used on Crash Landing consisted of recordings Hendrix originally made with Billy Cox on bass and either Mitch Mitchell or Buddy Miles on drums and on one occasion by Rocky Isaacs.

== Controversies ==
Crash Landing was the first release produced by Douglas, and immediately caused controversy. The liner notes of the album indicated that Douglas used several session musicians, none of whom had ever even met Hendrix, to re-record or overdub guitar, bass, drums, and percussion on the album, erasing the contributions of the original musicians on many songs and changing the feel of the songs (Hendrix' vocals and guitar contributions were retained). This was evidently done to give a finish to songs that were works in progress or may have been recorded as demos. Douglas also added female backing vocals to the title track. The album peaked at numbers five in the US and 35 in the UK, the highest chart positions since The Cry of Love. The album reached number 5 in Canada, and was number 38 in the year-end chart. The track "Captain Coconut" never existed as recorded by Hendrix; it was a concoction made by assistant engineer John Jansen of three other unrelated tracks. When Eddie Kramer found him doing this, he strongly criticised him and told him to stop. However, Alan Douglas put the track out anyway.

== Track listing ==
All tracks are written by Jimi Hendrix. Alan Douglas claimed co-writer credits on "Somewhere Over the Rainbow", "Crash Landing", "Come Down Hard on Me", "Peace in Mississippi", and "Captain Coconut" on the original release. Most post-1990 CD releases omit Douglas' co-writing credits.

Side one
No.	Title	Post-Douglas release(s)	Length
1.	"Message to Love"	West Coast Seattle Boy	3:14
2.	"Somewhere Over the Rainbow"	People, Hell and Angels	3:30
3.	"Crash Landing"	People, Hell and Angels	4:14
4.	"Come Down Hard on Me"	The Jimi Hendrix Experience (box set)	3:16
Total length:			14:14

Side two
No.	Title	Post-Douglas release(s)	Length
1.	"Peace in Mississippi"	Single with box set reissue	4:21
2.	"With the Power"	Both Sides of the Sky	3:28
3.	"Stone Free Again"	Valleys of Neptune	3:25
4.	"Captain Coconut"	Burning Desire	4:06
Total length:			15:20 29:34

== Personnel ==
- Jimi Hendrix – guitars, lead vocals, backing vocals
- Buddy Miles – drums on tracks 1, 6, backing vocals on tracks 1 and 6
- Billy Cox – bass guitar on tracks 1, 6 and 8, backing vocals on tracks 1 and 6
- Juma Sultan – percussion on track 1

Added in 1975:

- Jimmy Maelen – percussion on tracks 1, 3, 5–8
- Jeff Mironov – guitars on tracks 2–5 and 7
- Allan Schwartzberg – drums on tracks 2–5, 7 and 8
- Bob Babbitt – bass on tracks 2–5 and 7
- Linda November – backing vocals on track 3
- Vivian Cherry – backing vocals on track 3
- Barbara Massey – backing vocals on track 3
