= Karl Ferris =

English music photographer (born 1948)

- Born: Hastings, Sussex, England
- Known for: Psychedelic photography

Karl Ferris (born 1948) is an English music photographer/designer. He worked on album covers for Eric Clapton, Cream, Donovan, The Hollies and Jimi Hendrix. He studied at Hastings.

== Early years ==
Karl Ferris was born and grew up in 1948 in Hastings, England. He studied at Hastings College of Art, and focused on Pre-Raphaelite painting. This inspired his psychedelic photography style.

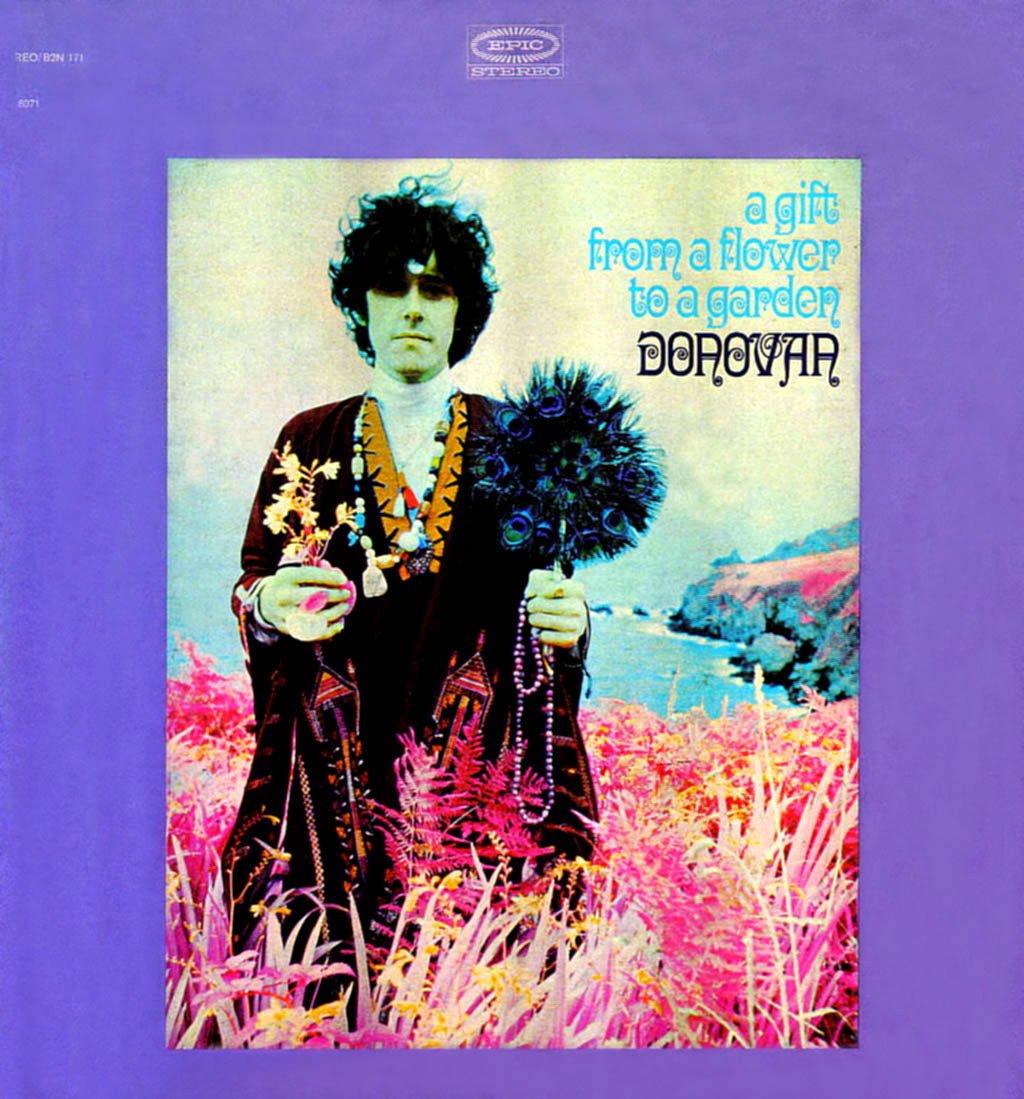
"A Gift From A Flower to a Garden", the first Rock/Pop box set

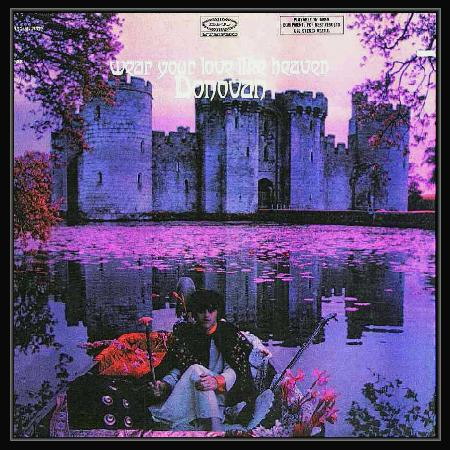
"Wear Your Love Like Heaven", front cover

After school, Ferris signed up as a steward on a P&O liner that went to Australia via India.

Once Ferris returned to England, he served two years with the Royal Air Force (RAF) for his National Service as an aerial photographer. During this period he became friends with a fellow conscriptee who was a member of a Liverpool based "Mersey Beat" group, and he was introduced for the first time to this genre of music.

Ferris was invited back to Liverpool to see a new group—the Beatles—who were appearing at the Cavern Club and was introduced to them there. From that point, he was hooked on Beat music from which The Beatles took their name.

After his military service, Ferris emigrated to Vancouver, Canada working as an assistant to master photographer Harry Nygard. From Nygard, Karl learned the skills of composition, form and texture. He also involved himself in the "Beatnik" lifestyle and began hanging out in coffee bars, listening to poetry readings and the progressive jazz of artists such as Miles Davis, Herbie Hancock, John Coltrane, Eric Dolphy and Ornette Coleman. He photographed his first music subjects at these gatherings for local newspapers and magazines.

Ferris also began to take fashion shots of girlfriends and models, building up a respectable portfolio. Nygard told him that he had a real talent in this area, but to further expand his portfolio, he should return to London where the "Mod" fashion scene was creating new opportunities in the world of arts, music and fashion.

In 1964 Karl returned to England and the "Happening" Beat scene. Ferris did commission work as a fashion and cover photographer for teen magazines 19, Honey, Petticoat, She and later for Vogue, Harper's Bazaar, Burda, French Mode and Marie Claire. These commissions brought him to such locations as Paris, Cannes, Munich, Ibiza and Morocco. When he wasn't working, Ferris would join the "Scene", and after meeting (and eventually dating) Denmark's top Superstar model of the time, Maude Bertelsen, Karl was introduced to a Pop group called The King Bees. King Bees invited Ferris to sing cover versions of Rolling Stones songs with them, and so he began touring in and around Copenhagen with the group.

He eventually returned to England for a "fashion shoot" offer with Vogue.

In 1966, The Beatles had just released Rubber Soul and Karl had the chance to meet up with their official photographer, Robert Freeman, who encouraged Ferris to experiment with different styles of images – which he promptly did – and created his unique psychedelic style. That summer on a trip to the island of Ibiza he discovered and began shooting the innovative psychedelic fashion work of designers Simon Posthuma and Marijke Koger—aka The Fool—and these photos were eventually printed in the fashion section of The Sunday Times. This was the first time such psychedelic photography and fashions had been seen anywhere.

He and The Fool were then invited to come to London to shoot some more "Psychedelic" fashion features for other magazines, working from a shared studio in a former private dance theatre. In this studio, they created "Art Happenings" with self-played psychedelic music with Fashion shows, Freeform Dancing and Action painting, with Liquid Light and Photo slide projections superimposed on the performers by Karl Ferris. These Event parties became the talk of the Music and Art scene at the time and famous current Pop Stars and Artists would drop by and join in the action, "Drop In and Drop Out" was the slogan used for the events.

Even the Beatles heard about the "Happenings" and came by and joined in, same with Pink Floyd, Eric Clapton, Cream, Donovan, T Rex, Mick Jagger, Grahman Nash, Graham Bond and artists Nigel Weymouth, Hapshas and the Coloured Coat, Peter Max and David Hockney.

In 1967, Simon Posthuma and Marijke Koger with their colleges Josje Leger and Barry Finch "The Fool" were commissioned by The Beatles to paint their – "Apple Boutique" mural covering the entire building outside and in. They also created a Psychedelic Fashion line that was to be sold inside the store, and Karl was there to photograph it all.

Karl Ferris was invited to do a stage "Liquid light show" for Pink Floyd, which is believed to be one of the first ever done in England.

== Jimi Hendrix ==
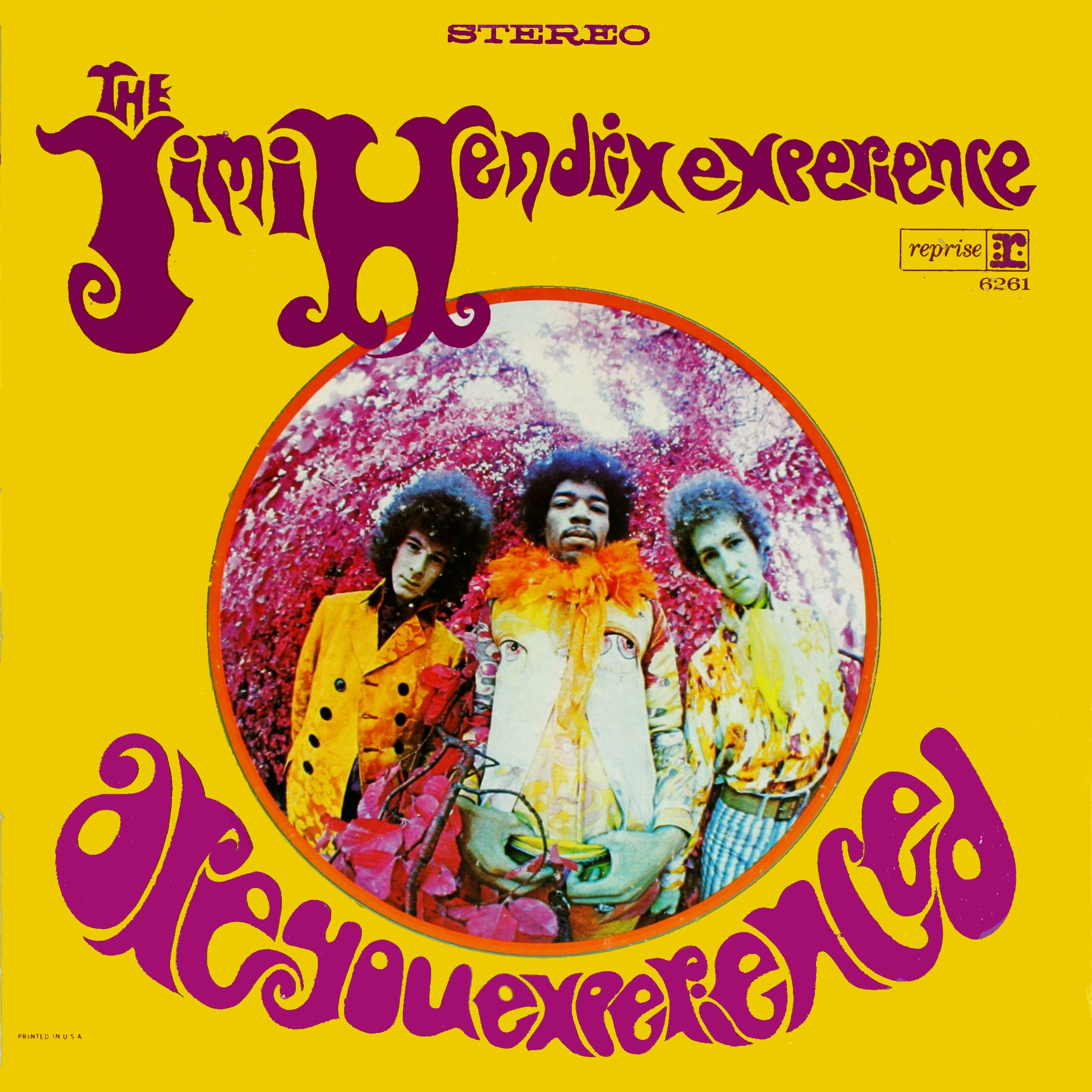
'Are You Experienced' – US Album Cover.

Ferris was introduced to singer/guitarist Jimi Hendrix in 1967 through musician/producer Chas Chandler, who had "discovered" Hendrix. Hendrix disliked the UK cover of Are You Experienced, so arrangements were made for a photo shoot with Ferris. Hendrix wanted "something psychedelic". During a meeting with the band, Ferris told Hendrix that he wanted to hear more of their music from which to draw inspiration. They accommodated his request by allowing him to attend several sessions for their second album, Axis: Bold as Love. Ferris brought home tapes from the sessions, which along with Are You Experienced he listened to intently. His first impression of the music was that it was "so far out that it seemed to come from outer space", which inspired him to develop a backstory about a "group travelling through space in a Biosphere on their way to bring their unworldly space music to earth." With this concept in mind, he took color photographs of the band at Kew Gardens in London, using a fisheye lens which was then popular in Mod sub-culture. Ferris used what Egan described as "an infrared technique of his own invention which combined color reversal with heat signature", further enhancing the exotic nature of the image. Ferris was an experienced fashion photographer, and his interest in the finer details of his covers led him to choose the band's wardrobe. After seeing Hendrix with his hair combed away from the scalp, Ferris requested that he wear it that way during the photo shoot. Hendrix's girlfriend, Kathy Etchingham, trimmed his hair to improve its symmetry, forming an afro that became the basis of a homogenized Experience image. Redding and Mitchell liked Hendrix's new hairstyle, so Ferris hired a hairdresser to style their hair in a similar fashion. After purchasing clothing for Redding and Mitchell at the boutiques on King's Road—Hendrix wore clothes from his wardrobe, including a psychedelic jacket with a pair of eyes printed on the front which had been given to him by a fan—the Experience travelled to Kew Gardens. In an effort to focus on Hendrix's hands, Ferris shot the band at a low angle. The daylight faded soon after their arrival at the garden, so they returned the following day for a second shoot, which was not needed; the image selected for the US cover of Are You Experienced was the first shot taken the previous day. Ferris chose the cover's yellow background and its surreal lettering, and he intended for a textured gatefold jacket that Reprise, as a cost-saving measure, did not approve. (Note: The back of the sleeve featured a monochrome image of the Experience.)

His images then appeared on all three US "Experience" album covers released during Hendrix's short life – "Are You Experienced?", "Axis Bold As Love", "Electric Ladyland" and the Japanese "Smash Hits"...In the year 2000, Karl's Hampstead Studio 1968 shot of "The Jimi Hendrix Experience" was used as the Cover of the multi disc, purple velvet "Rolls Royce" box set. Ferris went on to create the album cover images for Donovan's "A Gift from a Flower to a Garden" ("Wear Your Love Like Heaven"/"For Little Ones") and the "Hurdy Gurdy Donovan" EP and (again, partnering with The Fool) for The Hollies' Evolution. He was also instrumental in creating their overall looks for the shoots, which then became their recognized public images. During the years 1967–69, Ferris was one of the preferred photographers to the British rock elite, shooting also many publicity photos for them. He was called "The Icon with the Nikon" by the musicians and Press back then. In 1968, Ferris accompanied Donovan on his US tour and was commissioned by Look to shoot a feature article on Donovan, after which he was retained as a 'Stringer' in Europe to shoot images for music articles there. In 1969, Karl's Donovan psychedelic shots were featured in an article in Twen, the famous German art magazine.

== 1970s–2000 ==
Ferris left London with his pregnant wife Anke in 1970 and went to live in Ibiza to bring up their son Lorien. Joni Mitchell visited Ferris in Ibiza in 1970 on the recommendation of Graham Nash and was photographed by Ferris. Ferris continued shooting fashion and glamour photographs for magazines in Europe and the USA. In 1980, Ferris received a commission from Playboy Magazine to photograph "Welcome Back Kotter" star Melonie Haller (John Travolta's love interest and the only female "Sweathog") for a "Celebrity Pictorial" in the famous Bo Derek issue.

== Collections ==
Ferris' work is included in the National Portrait Gallery, London.

== Sources ==
- Egan, Sean (2013). Jimi Hendrix and the making of Are You Experienced (updated and expanded ed.). Askill. ISBN 978-0-9545750-5-2.
