= Larry Appelbaum =

American jazz historian (1957–2025)

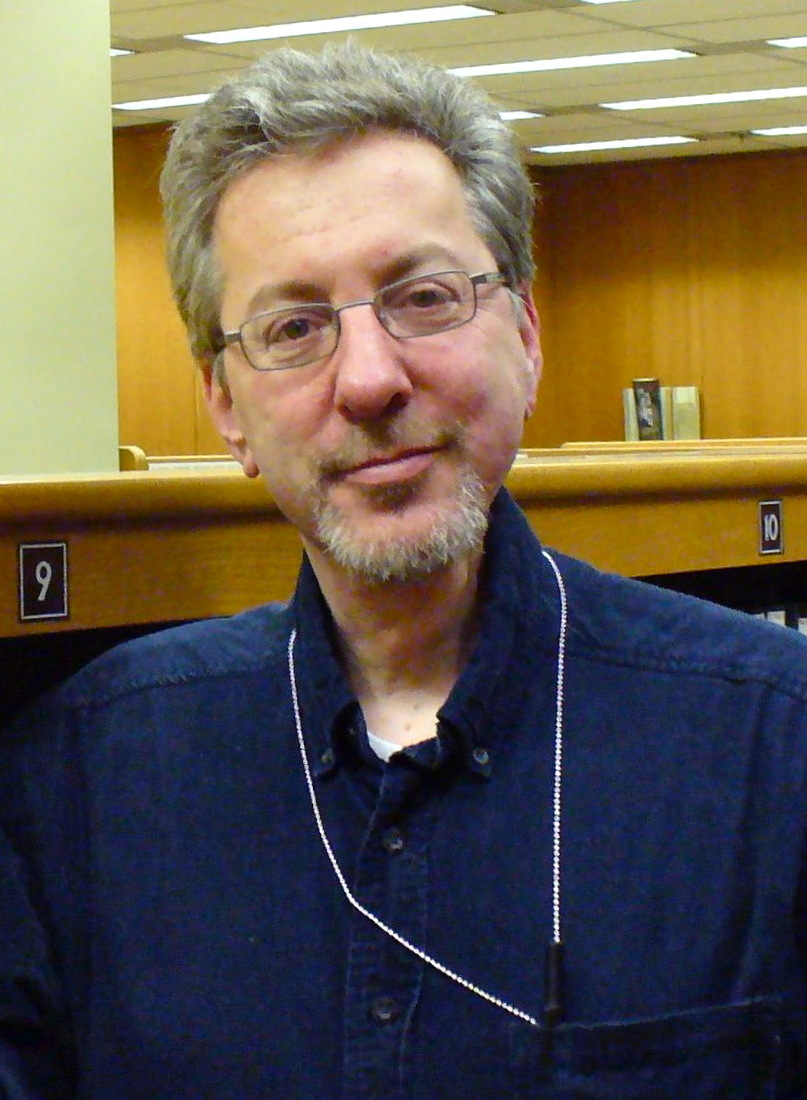
- Born: April 12, 1957; Washington, D.C., US
- Died: February 21, 2025 (aged 67); Washington, D.C., US
- Employers: Library of Congress; WPFW
- Known for: Discovery of lost tapes from Thelonious Monk Quartet with John Coltrane at Carnegie Hall

Lawrence Allan Appelbaum (April 12, 1957 – February 21, 2025) was an American audio engineer and jazz historian. He was the Senior Music Reference Specialist in the Music Division of the Library of Congress, and hosted a jazz show (focused on bebop and post-bop) on WPFW called The Sound of Surprise for over 40 years. Appelbaum is most known for discovering tapes such as the Thelonious Monk Quartet with John Coltrane at Carnegie Hall. He died in February 2025 due to complications of pneumonia.

== Early life and education ==
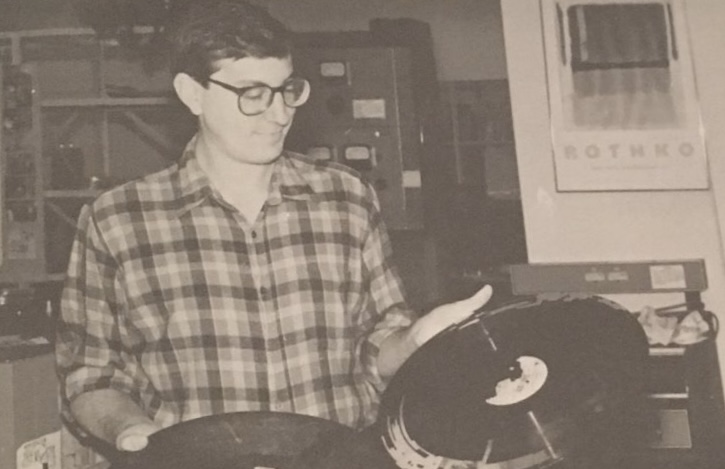
Larry Appelbaum working as a recording technician in the 1980s.

Lawrence Appelbaum was born in Washington, D.C., on April 12, 1957, and attended Northwood High School and later the University of Maryland, graduating with a bachelor's degree in 1979. His father, Melvin Appelbaum, owned clothing stores, and his mother, Estelle Appelbaum, was a homemaker. He had two older brothers: Howard and Marc Appelbaum.

== Career ==
Appelbaum first DJed at his college radio station, WMUC-FM, and later went to WDCU (a former jazz station). He got his first job at the Library of Congress in 1979, and became a DJ on WPFW in 1981.

Appelbaum often wrote criticism in DownBeat and JazzTimes. He contributed to a series called Before and After, where he would interview musicians, ask them to criticize music, and then tell them who was playing. Appelbaum got the papers of Max Roach, Eric Dolphy, and Billy Strayhorn added to the collections of the Library of Congress. In the Library of Congress, he was the supervisor of the Magnetic Research Laboratory at the Library of Congress, and later became a senior music reference specialist in the Music Division. Besides being an archivist, Appelbaum's activities also included lecturing and making a series of films about jazz. After a stroke in 2017, he moved to Culpeper, Virginia and worked remotely for the Library of Congress until retiring in 2020. In 2024, Appelbaum was awarded the Benny Golson Jazz Master Award from the Howard University Jazz Ensemble.

=== Discoveries ===
Appelbaum got his first job at the Library of Congress while still in college in 1979. In his role at the Library of Congress digitizing recordings, he discovered the lost tape of Thelonious Monk Quartet with John Coltrane at Carnegie Hall. It was released in 2005 through Blue Note Records. In an interview, Appelbaum said he found the set of tapes featuring Coltrane and Monk (among others) in a "truck full of tapes." The recordings were later added to the Grammy Hall of Fame. John Edward Hasse, curator of music at the National Museum of American History, said that "It was a startling find: a discovery of a lost recording of two of the greatest jazz musicians playing together." Hasse called Appelbaum a "walking encyclopedia of music."

In 2007, a similar discovery enabled Sonny Rollins to announce the release of his 1957 debut at the Carnegie Hall. Sonny Rollins's sets were very short. He played with drummer Kenny Dennis and bassist Wendell Marshall. The tapes include Rollins's performance of "Moritat", "Sonnymoon for Two", and "Some Enchanted Evening." When Appelbaum found the Rollins tapes, he sent it to them to Rollins through his nephew, and got no response. Appelbaum later found out through an article on The New York Times that Rollins was planning to publish the tapes along with tapes from a recent show in Carnegie Hall, which Rollins had been inspired by Appelbaum's discovery to do. Appelbaum also found tapes from the Zoot Sims Quartet (featuring Chet Baker), the Dizzy Gillespie Orchestra, and Ray Charles. In addition, Appelbaum found recordings from 1946 of Duke Ellington playing with Django Reinhardt.

== Death ==
Appelbaum died from complications of pneumonia at a Washington hospital on February 21, 2025, at the age of 67. The New York Times described Masha Morozova as his "longtime companion", though The Washington Post said they were divorced at the time of his death. Miyuki Williams, Appelbaum's coworker at WPFW, said that "his love for music was on display for all to see, radiating in every project he touched."
