= May This Be Love =

Song by the Jimi Hendrix Experience

from the album Are You Experienced
- Released: May 12, 1967 (UK); August 23, 1967 (US)
- Recorded: April 3, 1967
- Studio: Olympic, London
- Genre: Psychedelic rock
- Length: 3:10
- Label: Track (UK); Reprise (US)
- Songwriter(s): Jimi Hendrix
- Producer(s): Chas Chandler

"May This Be Love" is a song written by Jimi Hendrix for the Jimi Hendrix Experience debut album Are You Experienced (1967). It is a soft ballad that demonstrates Hendrix's ability to write thoughtful lyrics and subtle melodies.

== Background and recording ==
Are You Experienced and its preceding singles were recorded over a five-month period from late October 1966 through early April 1967. The album was completed in sixteen recording sessions at three London locations, including De Lane Lea Studios, CBS, and Olympic. The group's manager Chas Chandler booked many of the sessions at Olympic because the facility was acoustically superior and equipped with most of the latest technology, though it was still using four-track recorders, whereas American studios were using eight-track.

On April 3, 1967, the Experience returned to Olympic, adding overdubs and completing final mixes on several unfinished masters. During the eight-hour session, the band recorded three new songs, including "Highway Chile", "May This Be Love", and "Are You Experienced?".

== Composition and lyrics ==
"May This Be Love" is a soft ballad that demonstrates Hendrix's ability to write thoughtful lyrics and subtle melodies. Author and musicologist Keith Shadwick wrote: "This is a melodic, romantic composition that borders on the sentimental". Author David Stubbs described the song as "far and away the prettiest track on" the album, and an example of Hendrix's versatility as a guitarist. According to musicologist Dave Whitehill, the song is characteristic of Hendrix's "gentler side", utilizing the E and A major pentatonic scales to create a "pastorale setting befitting the lyrical content". Whitehill described the guitar solo as "one of Jimi's most lyrical and lovely".

== Releases and critical reception ==
"May This Be Love" was first released on both the UK and US editions of Are You Experienced (May 12, and August 23, 1967, respectively). An alternate version was recorded during the same session in which Hendrix doubled his vocal and the guitars were mixed differently. In 2010, it was included on the West Coast Seattle Boy: The Jimi Hendrix Anthology box set.

In a song review for AllMusic, Thomas Ward called the original recording "one of the most musically sophisticated tracks on Are You Experienced?". He praises Hendrix's vocal, lyrics, and guitar work and concludes "'May This Be Love' is essentially a beautiful love song, one of the finest love songs in Hendrix's canon. The guitar solo at the song's conclusion is outstanding."

== Other versions ==
Emmylou Harris, accompanied by Daniel Lanois, covered "May This Be Love" on her 1995 album Wrecking Ball.

== Notes ==
Citations

References

- Egan, Sean (2013). Jimi Hendrix and the Making of Are You Experienced (updated and expanded ed.). Askill. ISBN 978-0-9545750-5-2.
- McDermott, John (2009). Ultimate Hendrix: An Illustrated Encyclopedia of Live Concerts and Sessions. BackBeat Books. ISBN 978-0-87930-938-1.
- Roby, Steven (2002). Black Gold: The Lost Archives of Jimi Hendrix. Billboard Books. ISBN 978-0-8230-7854-7.
- Shadwick, Keith (2003). Jimi Hendrix: Musician. Backbeat Books. ISBN 978-0-87930-764-6.
- Stubbs, David (2003). Voodoo Child: Jimi Hendrix, the Stories Behind Every Song. Thunder's Mouth Press. ISBN 978-1-56025-537-6.
- Whitehill, Dave (1989). Hendrix: Are You Experienced. Hal Leonard. ISBN 978-0-7119-3654-6.

Documentaries

- Joe Boyd, John Head, Gary Weis (Directors) (2005) [1973]. Jimi Hendrix (DVD). Warner Home Video. ASIN B0009E3234.
- Bob Smeaton (Director) (2013). Jimi Hendrix: Hear My Train A Comin' (DVD, Blu-ray). Sony Legacy. ASIN B00F031WB8.
- Bob Smeaton (Director) (2012). West Coast Seattle Boy: Jimi Hendrix: Voodoo Child (DVD, Blu-ray). Sony Legacy. ASIN B007ZC92FA.
