= Larry Lee (musician) =

American guitarist and singer-songwriter (1943–2007)

- Born: Lawrence H. Lee, Jr. March 7, 1943
- Origin: Memphis, Tennessee, USA
- Died: October 30, 2007 (aged 64)
- Genres: Hard rock, psychedelic rock, blues-rock, rhythm and blues, soul
- Occupation: Singer-songwriter
- Instruments: Vocals, guitar
- Years active: 1963–2007

Lawrence H. "Larry" Lee Jr. (March 7, 1943 – October 30, 2007) was an American guitarist and singer-songwriter from Memphis, Tennessee, best known for his work with Al Green and Jimi Hendrix.

== Gypsy Sun and Rainbows ==
Lee was an old friend of Jimi Hendrix and Billy Cox. They had all played together in various R&B acts, and in 1969 Lee joined Hendrix's band Gypsy Sun and Rainbows as rhythm guitarist, occasionally playing alternating lead. The newly formed band was hired to play the Woodstock Music Festival for which Hendrix had been previously booked to play with the Jimi Hendrix Experience. Lee had been back from the Vietnam War for only two weeks, was unemployed when Hendrix called him, and joined Gypsy Sun and Rainbows only a week before the Woodstock concert.

At the concert Hendrix and Lee both wore white outfits, and Lee wore a distinctive green bandana that had long tassels hanging over his eyes, which at the time he thought was a statement of originality. Lee played a 1955 Gibson Les Paul Custom guitar and sang his own composition "Master Mind" as well as two Impressions numbers sung as a medley - "Gypsy Woman" and "Aware of Love", with Hendrix playing Curtis Mayfield style back up. Lee also took several solos and played some alternating lead ("weaving") with Hendrix (he played the first guitar solo on Lover Man). Although all the songs he sang lead on at Woodstock were recorded, the Hendrix estate owns the rights to them and has thus far prohibited their release.

After Woodstock, Gypsy Sun and Rainbows then played at the Harlem "United Block" benefit and at the small "Salvation" club in Greenwich Village to a mixed reception. Lee then left the band and returned to his hometown Memphis, later stating that Hendrix was under heavy pressure from his management to return to the three-piece format of the Jimi Hendrix Experience, and he felt his departure would take some of the heat off Hendrix.

== Al Green years ==
During the 1970s, Lee acted as the band director and lead guitarist for Al Green's touring band. He appeared on The Tonight Show Starring Johnny Carson and television specials around the world with Green. Lee also was a songwriter and wrote for Stax Records early recording artists, the Astors. "Judy", a song he wrote during his days playing with Hendrix in Nashville was covered by Al Green and the Spidells. Lee briefly traveled with blues great Albert King. He said King fired him because his playing overshadowed King's.

In the 1980s and 90s, Lee teamed with his friend, El Espada, Timothy Lee Matthews, and they collaborated on Matthews' CD Songs for the Greats. Matthews, co-writer of the classic blues song "Breaking Up Somebody's Home", called Lee the consummate sideman. Lee's distinctive complementary rhythm and lead style can be heard on nine of the eleven songs on Matthews' CD.

Larry Lee lived in Memphis, Tennessee and played in the regional rock/blues/R&B outfit Elmo and the Shades. Lee was a member of Elmo and the Shades for eight years. The band enjoyed much popularity during this time playing nightclubs, casinos, parties, and occasional blues festivals throughout Memphis and the Mid-South. Lee is featured on three cuts on the 2009 CD by Elmo and the Shades, Blue Memphis. They are "Same Old Dog", "I Get the Blues for Free", and the title cut "Blue Memphis". Lee took his leave from the group in August 2006 as his battle with cancer left him too weak to perform.

Lee also joined in with Mike Strickland and the Usual Unusual Clowns at random intervals.

== Death ==
Larry Lee died in Memphis, Tennessee, on October 29, 2007, after a year battling stomach cancer, and was buried at 11 a.m. on November 6 in West Tennessee Veterans Cemetery. He left wife Carrie Lee, daughter April D. Lee and three sons - Lawrence H. Lee III, Robert A. Lee, and Thomas Lee. He was also survived by his mother, Lula Lee, and five grandchildren.

== Selective discography ==
with Jimi Hendrix

- Nine to the Universe (1980)
- Woodstock (1994)
- Live at Woodstock (1999)

with Al Green

- I'll Rise Again (1983)

with Timothy Lee Matthews

- Songs for the Greats (1998) featured on track 4, "What Did She Say"

with Elmo and the Shades

- Blue Memphis (2009)
