= Soundtrack Recordings from the Film Jimi Hendrix =

Soundtrack album by Jimi Hendrix
- Released: July 1973
- Recorded: 1967–1970
- Genre: Rock
- Length: 84:02
- Label: Reprise
- Producer: Joe Boyd

Jimi Hendrix American chronology
War Heroes (1972)	Soundtrack Recordings from the Film Jimi Hendrix (1973)	Crash Landing (1975)

Jimi Hendrix British chronology
War Heroes (1972)	Soundtrack Recordings from the Film Jimi Hendrix (1973)	Loose Ends (1974)

Professional ratings
Review scores
Source	Rating
AllMusic	3.5/5 stars
Christgau's Record Guide	C+

Soundtrack Recordings from the Film Jimi Hendrix is the soundtrack to the documentary film Jimi Hendrix (1973). The double album was released by Reprise Records in July 1973. It contains the full-length live performances from the film and some clips from interviews (though not necessarily from the film). The album peaked at number 89 on the Billboard album chart, which generated concern at Reprise Records that repackaging old material would no longer satisfy the fans of Jimi Hendrix. The album has not been released on compact disc.

== Film ==
The documentary was made in 1973 by Joe Boyd, John Head and Gary Weis for Warner Bros. The film contains concert footage from 1967 to 1970, including material from Isle of Wight and the Monterey Pop Festival. The film also includes interviews with Hendrix's contemporaries, family and friends. The estate of Jimi Hendrix authorized the 1973 film to be re-released on video and DVD in 1999, and a special edition DVD was released in 2005.

== LP track listing ==
Songs by Jimi Hendrix unless otherwise noted.

Side 1
No.	Title	Recording date and location	Length
1.	"Rock Me, Baby" (B.B. King, Joe Josea)	June 18, 1967, Monterey Pop Festival	3:01
2.	"Wild Thing" (Chip Taylor)	June 18, 1967, Monterey Pop Festival	5:18
3.	"Machine Gun I"	August 31, 1970, Isle of Wight Festival	7:45
4.	"Interviews I" (Jimi Hendrix, Al Hendrix, Freddie Mae Gauthier and Dolores Hall)		3:41
Total length:			19:45

Side 2
No.	Title	...	Length
5.	"Johnny B. Goode" (Chuck Berry)	May 30, 1970, Berkeley Community Theatre (1st Set)	3:37
6.	"Hey Joe" (Billy Roberts)	June 18, 1967, Monterey Pop Festival	3:50
7.	"Purple Haze"	May 30, 1970, Berkeley Community Theatre (2nd Set)	3:40
8.	"Like a Rolling Stone" (Bob Dylan)	June 18, 1967, Monterey Pop Festival	6:11
9.	"Interviews II" (Jimi Hendrix, Little Richard, Pat Hartley and Fayne Pridgon)		3:21
Total length:			20:39 40:24

Side 3
No.	Title	...	Length
10.	"The Star-Spangled Banner" (Traditional)	August 18, 1969, Woodstock	3:42
11.	"Machine Gun II"	December 31, 1969, Fillmore East	12:35
12.	"Hear My Train A Comin' (Acoustic Version)"	December 19, 1967, Bruce Fleming Photography Studio, London	3:05
13.	"Interviews III"		2:36
Total length:			21:58

Side 4
No.	Title	...	Length
14.	"Red House"	August 31, 1970, Isle of Wight Festival	11:18
15.	"In from the Storm"	August 31, 1970, Isle of Wight Festival	4:27
16.	"Interviews IV" (Hartley, Alan Douglas, Pridgeon and The Ghetto Fighters)		5:55
Total length:			21:40 43:48 01:24:02
