= More Experience =

Live album by Jimi Hendrix
- Released: March 1972
- Recorded: February 24, 1969
- Venue: Royal Albert Hall, London
- Genre: Rock
- Length: 27:11
- Label: Bulldog/Ember (UK); Imagem (Brazil)
- Producer: Steve Gold; Michael Jeffery for Pomegranate Productions

Jimi Hendrix U.K. chronology
Hendrix in the West (1972)	More Experience (1972)	War Heroes (1972)

Professional ratings
Review scores
Source	Rating
AllMusic	3/5 stars

More Experience is the second live album that was issued of the performance by the Jimi Hendrix Experience at the Royal Albert Hall in London on February 24, 1969. Released in March 1972 in the United Kingdom by Ember Records, it was promoted as a soundtrack to a film documenting the performance. However, legal difficulties prevented release of the film and the complete soundtrack.

Accompanied by incorrect liner notes, it features two highly edited recordings that appeared on the previous Ember release, Experience, plus two tracks that had been already released on Hendrix in the West (1972), and three others.

== Track listing ==
All tracks are written by Jimi Hendrix, except where noted.

Side one
No.	Title	Length
1.	"Little Ivey [sic]" (a.k.a. Little Wing)	3:20
2.	"Voodoo Child (Slight Return)"	7:17
3.	"Room Full of Mirrors" (edited from 8:15)	2:56
Total length:		13:33

Side two
No.	Title	Writer(s)	Length
1.	"Fire"		3:44
2.	"Purple Haze"		3:04
3.	"Wild Thing" (actually part of a medley with "Purple Haze")	Chip Taylor	1:30
4.	"Bleeding Heart" (edited from 8:27)	Elmore James	5:30
Total length:			13:48 27:21

== Personnel ==
The Jimi Hendrix Experience

- Jimi Hendrix – guitar, vocals
- Mitch Mitchell – drums
- Noel Redding – bass guitar

Additional musicians on "Room Full of Mirrors"

- Chris Wood – flute
- Dave Mason – guitar
