= Hendrix in the West =

Live album by Jimi Hendrix
- Released: January 1972
- Recorded: February 1969 – August 1970
- Genre: Rock
- Length: 40:43
- Label: Polydor (UK); Reprise (US); Barclay (France)
- Producer: Eddie Kramer, John Jansen

Jimi Hendrix UK chronology
Rainbow Bridge (1971)	Hendrix in the West (1972)	More Experience (1972)

Jimi Hendrix US chronology
Rainbow Bridge (1971)	Hendrix in the West (1972)	War Heroes (1972)

Hendrix in the West is a live album by Jimi Hendrix, released posthumously in January 1972 by Polydor Records (UK), and in February by Reprise Records (US). The album tracks are split between those recorded in 1969 by the Jimi Hendrix Experience with bassist Noel Redding and drummer Mitch Mitchell and in 1970 with Billy Cox and Mitchell during The Cry of Love Tour.

== Recording ==
The album contains songs from Hendrix's performances at the Royal Albert Hall on February 24, 1969, the San Diego Sports Arena on May 24, 1969, Berkeley Community Theatre on May 30, 1970 and the Isle of Wight Festival on August 30, 1970. The album's credits mislabel "Little Wing" and "Voodoo Child" as being recorded in San Diego, but actually they were recorded at the Royal Albert Hall on February 24, 1969.

== Critical reception and charts ==
Professional ratings
1971 album
Review scores
Source	Rating
AllMusic	4/5 stars
Christgau's Record Guide	A−

In a review for AllMusic, Sean Westergaard gave the album four out of five stars. He notes the relatively rare performances of "God Save the Queen", "Sgt. Pepper's Lonely Hearts Club Band", "Blue Suede Shoes" and "Johnny B. Goode" as adding to Hendrix's more typical concert material.

Hendrix in the West reached No. 7 in the UK albums chart, No. 12 on both the U.S. Best Selling Soul LP's and the Billboard 200 charts, and No. 11 in Canada.

== 1971 album track listing ==
All songs were written by Hendrix, except where noted. The album details are taken from the original 1971 Reprise LP record labels. The original UK Polydor release reverses the sides, with "Johnny B. Goode" opening side one and "The Queen" side two. Both the Reprise and Polydor album liner notes list the tracks in a different order than the actual LPs.

Side one
No.	Title	Venue/date	Length
1.	"The Queen" (Traditional)	Isle of Wight, 8/31/70	timing combined with next track
2.	"Sgt. Pepper's Lonely Hearts Club Band" (John Lennon, Paul McCartney)	Isle of Wight, 8/31/70	4:02
3.	"Little Wing"	Royal Albert Hall, 2/24/69	3:13
4.	"Red House"	San Diego Sports Arena, 5/24/69	13:12
Total length:			25:29

Side two
No.	Title	Venue/date	Length
1.	"Johnny B. Goode" (Chuck Berry)	Berkeley Community Theatre, 5/30/70 (1st show)	4:45
2.	"Lover Man"	Berkeley Community Theatre, 5/30/70 (2nd show)	3:05
3.	"Blue Suede Shoes" (Carl Perkins)	Berkeley Community Theatre, 5/30/70 (afternoon rehearsals)	4:31
4.	"Voodoo Child (Slight Return)"	Royal Albert Hall, 2/24/69	7:55
Total length:			20:26 45:55

== 2011 re-release ==
Professional ratings
2011 re-release
Review scores
Source	Rating
Rolling Stone	4.5/5 stars

Hendrix in the West was re-released on September 13, 2011, as part of Experience Hendrix's project to remaster Hendrix's discography. Since the rights to the Royal Albert Hall performances that appear on the original LP are in dispute, the re-release substitutes the recordings of "Little Wing" (3:52) from Winterland on October 12, 1968, and "Voodoo Child" (10:40) from the San Diego Sports Arena on May 24, 1969. It also adds "Fire", "I Don't Live Today" and "Spanish Castle Magic" from San Diego as bonus tracks after "Little Wing".

== Personnel ==
- Jimi Hendrix – guitar, vocals
- Mitch Mitchell – drums
- Noel Redding – bass guitar (1968–1969 tracks)
- Billy Cox – bass guitar (1970 tracks)
