= Midnight Lightning =

Compilation album by Jimi Hendrix
- Released: November 1975
- Recorded: 1968–1970; 1975 (overdubs)
- Genre: Rock
- Length: 35:58
- Labels: Polydor (UK); Reprise (US)
- Producers: Alan Douglas, Tony Bongiovi

Jimi Hendrix chronology
Crash Landing (1975)	Midnight Lightning (1975)	Jimi Hendrix vol. 2 (1976)

Midnight Lightning is a posthumous compilation album by American rock guitarist Jimi Hendrix. It was released in November 1975 by Reprise Records in the US and Polydor Records in the UK. It was the second to be produced by Alan Douglas and Tony Bongiovi and contains demo-type recordings that were overdubbed with musicians who had never played with Hendrix. Despite including reworkings of the popular live songs "Hear My Train" and "Machine Gun", the album was not as well received as its predecessor, peaking at numbers 43 in the US and 46 in the UK.

== Background ==
Douglas continued the controversial methods he had adopted on Crash Landing and brought in many of the same session musicians to overdub parts of songs. The only original recording (apart from those by Hendrix) was Mitchell's drumming on "Hear My Train". In response to the previous outcry from fans and critics, Douglas did not claim co-writer credit for any songs on Midnight Lightning. After Experience Hendrix secured the rights to Hendrix's recordings in 1997, original versions of the tracks have been released on further albums and boxsets.

== Critical reception ==
Professional ratings
Review scores
Source	Rating
AllMusic	3/5 stars
Christgau's Record Guide	B+

In Christgau's Record Guide: Rock Albums of the Seventies (1981), Robert Christgau regarded Midnight Lightning as an improvement by Douglas over Crash Landing because of highlight instrumentals such as "Trash Man", overdubbed guitar from Jeff Mironov and Lance Quinn, and "the blues playing — as opposed to singing or writing". AllMusic's Joe Viglione later said the enduring quality of Hendrix's music was retained in spite of Douglas's "doctoring and musicians jamming with his art after the fact."

== Track listing ==
All tracks are written by Jimi Hendrix, except where noted.

Side one
No.	Title	Post-Douglas release(s)	Length
1.	"Trash Man"	Hear My Music; Valleys of Neptune (Target edition)	3:15
2.	"Midnight Lightning"	Electric Lady Studios - A Jimi Hendrix Vision	3:49
3.	"Hear My Train"	Valleys of Neptune	5:43
4.	"Gypsy Boy (New Rising Sun)"	People, Hell and Angels	3:45
Total length:			16:32

Side two
No.	Title	Post-Douglas release(s)	Length
1.	"Blue Suede Shoes" (Carl Perkins)		3:29
2.	"Machine Gun"		7:36
3.	"Once I Had a Woman"	Blues	5:20
4.	"Beginnings" (Mitch Mitchell)		3:02
Total length:			17:03 33:35

== Personnel ==
- Jimi Hendrix – guitars, vocals
- Mitch Mitchell – drums on "Hear My Train"

=== Added in 1975 ===
- Jeff Mironov – guitar on tracks 1, 2, 3, 5 and 8
- Lance Quinn – guitar on tracks 2, 4, 6 and 7
- Allan Schwartzberg – drums on tracks 1, 2, 4–8, percussion on tracks 3 and 4
- Bob Babbitt – bass guitar
- Jimmy Maelen – percussion on tracks 2 and 8
- Maeretha Stewart – backing vocals on tracks 2, 4 and 7
- Barbara Massey – backing vocals on tracks 2, 4 and 7
- Vivian Cherry – backing vocals on tracks 2, 4 and 7
- Buddy Lucas – harmonica on track 7
