= Experience (Jimi Hendrix album) =

Live album by Jimi Hendrix
- Released: August 1971
- Recorded: February 24, 1969
- Venue: Royal Albert Hall, London
- Genre: Rock
- Length: 30:05
- Label: Bulldog/Ember
- Producer: Steve Gold; Michael Jeffery for Pomegranate Productions

Jimi Hendrix U.K. chronology
The Cry of Love (1971)	Experience (1971)	Isle of Wight (1971)

Professional ratings
Review scores
Source	Rating
AllMusic	3/5 stars

Experience is a live album by Jimi Hendrix, released in August 1971 in the United Kingdom by Ember Records. The album is an incomplete soundtrack to the unreleased film Experience documenting the Jimi Hendrix Experience's performance at the Royal Albert Hall on February 24, 1969. It peaked at number nine in the U.K. album charts in September 1971.

The album liner notes include "Recorded on 18 February 1969 in London's Royal Albert Hall during the shooting of the film Experience", but in fact all are from the performance on February 24, 1969. Additionally, they claim "These are probably the last recorded sounds of JIMI HENDRIX". Subsequent recordings released during Hendrix's lifetime include performances at Woodstock and with the Band of Gypsys. Several live albums and films documenting his 1970 the Cry of Love Tour have been released posthumously.

The Ember follow-up to Experience, titled More Experience, contains edited versions of two tracks from this album, plus two previously released songs and three additional recordings from the February 24 concert.

== Track listing ==
All tracks are written by Jimi Hendrix, except where noted.

Side one
No.	Title	Writer(s)	Length
1.	"Sunshine of Your Love"	Eric Clapton, Jack Bruce, Pete Brown	6:48
2.	"Room Full of Mirrors" (long version)		8:15

Side two
No.	Title	Writer(s)	Length
1.	"Bleeding Heart" (long version)	Elmore James	8:27
2.	"Smashing of Amps"		6:25

== Personnel ==
The Jimi Hendrix Experience

- Jimi Hendrix – guitar, vocals
- Mitch Mitchell – drums
- Noel Redding – bass guitar

Additional musicians on "Room Full of Mirrors"

- Chris Wood – flute
- Dave Mason – guitar
