= Bruce Fleming =

British fine art photographer

Bruce Fleming (born 1937 in Twickenham, Middlesex), is a British fine art photographer who is notable for his pop art portraits of the 1960s and 1970s. He is perhaps best known for his photography of the Hollies, Lulu, the Animals and of Jimi Hendrix for whom he produced the photo for the Jimi Hendrix Experience's album cover Are You Experienced in 1967.

== Biography ==
=== Early career ===
Fleming was born in 1937 in Twickenham, Middlesex. His father was a musician and his mother, a housewife. Fleming had his schooling interrupted by the Second World War when he was evacuated, and attended a boarding school when the war finished. His father left the family home when Fleming was young and he was raised as a teenager by his mother, who funded his early interest in photography by buying him his first camera. Fleming began by photographing various pieces of artwork and water colourings which he would paint.

In 1952, when Fleming was 15, he attended Hornsey Art College but was drafted into National Service in 1955 and served in Northern Ireland. He later took up a position in the Royal Air Force which he soon left. He had a series of menial jobs including a telephone operator, a waiter, a chef and a labourer. Still eager to make it as a photographer, Fleming came into contact with Ronnie Scott and socialised at his Jazz club in London. Fleming started to work for Melody Maker magazine and came to prominence for his photography of Eartha Kitt. During his work as a press photographer, Fleming survived a knife attack and gave up press in 1965 soon after he had photographed the funeral of Winston Churchill for The Sunday Times.

=== Pop art ===
Upon leaving press photography, Fleming met an influential public relations officer in London and was recruited as his personal photographer. The engagement brought Fleming into contact with the Rolling Stones and the Dave Clark Five and he became their personal photographer. From there, Fleming met Jimi Hendrix and became photographed the guitarist for many portraits; in 1967, Fleming composed the photo for the Jimi Hendrix Experience album cover Are You Experienced which he took which was taken in the Royal Botanic Gardens in Kew on 27 February 1967.

=== Recent career ===
Fleming is currently based in London and is married with children.
