= WPFW =

Pacifica radio station in Washington, D.C.

- Washington, D.C.; United States
- Broadcast area: Washington metropolitan area
- Frequency: 89.3 MHz (HD Radio)
- RDS: WPFW89.3

Programming
- Format: Public radio; Jazz
- Affiliations: Pacifica Radio

Ownership
- Owner: Pacifica Foundation

History
- First air date: February 28, 1977
- Call sign meaning: Pacifica Foundation Washington

Technical information
- Licensing authority: FCC
- Facility ID: 51255
- Class: B
- ERP: 50,000 watts
- HAAT: 125 meters (410 ft)
- Transmitter coordinates: 38.936°N 77.092°W

Links
- Public license information: Public file; LMS
- Webcast: Listen live
- Website: wpfwfm.org/radio/

WPFW (89.3 FM) is a public radio and jazz music community radio station, serving the Washington metropolitan area. It is owned by the Pacifica Foundation, with studios located on K Street, NW, Washington, D.C. The station's slogan is "Jazz and Justice."

== History ==
WPFW launched at 8 pm on February 28, 1977, with Duke Ellington and Billy Strayhorn's "Take the 'A' Train". The fifth station in the San Francisco-based Pacific Network, WPFW was different from the other Pacific stations in that it was established as a Black-staffed and -formatted station with a mission to serve as a community radio station for the largely African-American population of Washington, D.C.

The Pacifica Foundation began seeking an FM license in Washington, D.C., as early as 1968, but it was not until 1977 that WPFW won a temporary license. From its launch, WPFW was aggressive in promoting progressive voices and opinions. The station was accused of violating the Fairness Doctrine, which required broadcasters to provide time to opposing opinions, and the conservative American Legal Foundation (ALF) worked to block the station's license renewal in 1981. After a two-year delay, the Federal Communications Commission rejected the ALF's request and renewed the station's license in 1983.

Soon after it launched, the station began building out a studio facility in D.C.'s Chinatown neighborhood, which served as its home until 1996 when the station moved to Adams Morgan. In 2013, the building the station shared with the Washington City Paper was slated for demolition, necessitating another move. After a controversial attempt to relocate the station to Silver Spring, Maryland, WPFW relocated to a temporary facility on L Street NW before establishing new studios on K Street NW.

== Programming ==
Aside from syndicated Pacifica programs such as Democracy Now!, much of its programming is locally produced and dedicated to jazz, blues, classic soul music and international or world music.

As a public station, WPFW is commercial-free and listener-sponsored.
