= War Heroes =

Compilation album by Jimi Hendrix
- Released: October 1972
- Recorded: April 1967 – July 1970
- Genre: Rock
- Length: 35:20
- Labels: Polydor (UK); Reprise (US); Barclay (France)
- Producers: Eddie Kramer; John Jansen

Jimi Hendrix US chronology
Hendrix in the West (1972)	War Heroes (1972)	Soundtrack Recordings from the Film Jimi Hendrix (1973)

Jimi Hendrix UK chronology
More Experience (1972)	War Heroes (1972)	Soundtrack Recordings from the Film Jimi Hendrix (1973)

War Heroes is a compilation album by American guitarist Jimi Hendrix. Released in the UK in October 1972, and in December 1972 in the US, it was the third album of mostly unreleased studio recordings to be issued after Hendrix's death. The album was engineered, mixed and compiled by Eddie Kramer and John Jansen, although biographer and later Hendrix producer John McDermott also identifies Hendrix as a producer.

War Heroes contains three songs that Hendrix proposed for his fourth studio album: "Stepping Stone", "Izabella", and "Beginnings" (listed as "Beginning"). Some vinyl versions contain the song "Catastrophe" between "Peter Gunn" and Stepping Stone". These and songs from the two 1971 albums, The Cry of Love and Rainbow Bridge, were included on First Rays of the New Rising Sun (1997). War Heroes reached number 23 in the UK Albums Chart, number 48 on the US Billboard 200, and number 51 in Canada.

== Reception ==
Robert Christgau felt that the material was "toward the bottom of the barrel", with tracks like "Peter Gunn" and "3 Little Bears," sounding like "filler", though on the whole "still strong stuff", particularly "the "Highway Chile" riff and the sheer speed of "Steppin' Stone"". He rated the album a B in his scoring system.

Professional ratings
Review scores
Source	Rating
AllMusic	3/5 stars
Christgau's Record Guide	B

== Track listing ==
All tracks written by Jimi Hendrix, except where noted.

Side one
No.	Title	Later release	Length
1.	"Bleeding Heart" (Elmore James)	South Saturn Delta	3:15
2.	"Highway Chile"	Are You Experienced (1997 CD Reissues)	3:30
3.	"Tax Free" (Carlsen Hansen (Bo Hansson), Janne Carlsson)	South Saturn Delta	4:58
4.	"Peter Gunn" (Henry Mancini)	West Coast Seattle Boy	2:18
5.	"Stepping Stone"	First Rays of the New Rising Sun	4:07
Total length:			18:08

Side two
No.	Title	Later release	Length
1.	"Midnight"	South Saturn Delta	5:32
2.	"3 Little Bears"	Merry Christmas and Happy New Year	4:09
3.	"Beginning" (Mitch Mitchell)	First Rays of the New Rising Sun	4:13
4.	"Izabella"	First Rays of the New Rising Sun	2:55
Total length:			12:36 30:44

== Personnel ==
- Jimi Hendrix – guitars, vocals
- Mitch Mitchell – drums
- Billy Cox – bass guitar on "Bleeding Heart", "Peter Gunn Catastrophe", "Stepping Stone", "Beginning", and "Izabella"
- Noel Redding – bass guitar on "Highway Chile", "Tax Free", "Midnight", and "3 Little Bears"

== Recording details ==
Track	Location(s)	Recording date(s)
Track 1	Record Plant in New York City	March 24, 1970
Track 2	Olympic Studios in London	April 3, 1967
Track 3	Record Plant	May 1, 1968
Track 4	Record Plant	May 14, 1970
Track 5	Record Plant	November 14, 1969 and on June 26, 1970 (overdubs)
Track 6	Olmstead Studios	April 3, 1969
Track 7	Record Plant	May 2, 1968
Track 8	Electric Lady Studios in New York City	June 16 and/or July 1, 1970
Track 9	The Hit Factory in New York City	August 28 and 29, 1969
