= I Don't Live Today =

Song with lyrics by Jimi Hendrix performed by The Jimi Hendrix Experience

Song by the Jimi Hendrix Experience

from the album Are You Experienced
- Released: May 12, 1967 (UK); August 23, 1967 (US)
- Recorded: February 20, 1967
- Studio: Olympic, London
- Genre: Psychedelic rock; hard rock
- Length: 3:55
- Label: Track (UK); Reprise (US)
- Songwriter(s): Jimi Hendrix
- Producer(s): Chas Chandler

"I Don't Live Today" is a song by the Jimi Hendrix Experience, released on their debut album Are You Experienced (1967). In a 1968 interview, Hendrix said it "was dedicated to the American-Indian and all minority depression groups". The song was part of the Experience concert repertoire and Hendrix often repeated the dedication during his introductions.

== Recording ==
The song was recorded by the Experience in London during the sessions for Are You Experienced. Scheduling conflicts at Olympic Studios led manager Chas Chandler to book time at De Lane Lea Studios. There they recorded "I Don't Live Today", which featured a manual wah effect that predated the pedal unit. They completed a working master by the end of the day, though Hendrix eventually recorded a new lead vocal at Olympic.

== Composition and lyrics ==
Musicologist Richie Unterberger considers the lyrics to "I Don't Live Today" to be more at home in a gothic rock setting than in psychedelia, however; he describes the music as being "played and sung with an ebullience that belies the darkness of the lyrics." Author Sean Egan wrote that Hendrix "superbly, and with great economy of words evok[ed] despair, whether that despair be an individual's or the despair of a devastated and brutalized race." The song's tribal rhythms served as a platform for Hendrix's innovative guitar feedback improvisations. In honor of his Cherokee heritage, Hendrix dedicated the song to the American Indians and other minority groups.

== Notes ==
Citations

References

- Egan, Sean (2013). Jimi Hendrix and the Making of Are You Experienced (updated and expanded ed.). Askill. ISBN 978-0-9545750-5-2.
- Heatley, Michael (2009). Jimi Hendrix Gear: The Guitars, Amps & Effects that Revolutionized Rock 'n' Roll. Voyageur Press. ISBN 978-0-7603-3639-7.
- McDermott, John (2009). Ultimate Hendrix: An Illustrated Encyclopedia of Live Concerts and Sessions. BackBeat Books. ISBN 978-0-87930-938-1.
- Roby, Steven (2012). Hendrix on Hendrix: Interviews and Encounters with Jimi Hendrix. Chicago Review Press. ISBN 978-1-61374-322-5.
- Shadwick, Keith (2003). Jimi Hendrix: Musician. Backbeat Books. ISBN 978-0-87930-764-6.
- Unterberger, Richie (2009). The Rough Guide to Jimi Hendrix. Rough Guides. ISBN 978-1-84836-002-0.
