= Are You Experienced =

1967 studio album by the Jimi Hendrix Experience

- UK cover

Studio album by the Jimi Hendrix Experience
- Released: May 12, 1967 (UK); August 23, 1967 (US)
- Recorded: October 23, 1966 – April 4, 1967
- Studios: De Lane Lea, CBS, & Olympic, London
- Genres: Psychedelic rock; hard rock; acid rock; blues rock
- Length: 38:34 (UK); 39:29 (US)
- Labels: Polydor; Track
- Producer: Chas Chandler

Jimi Hendrix chronology
Are You Experienced (1967)	Axis: Bold as Love (1967)

Alternative cover
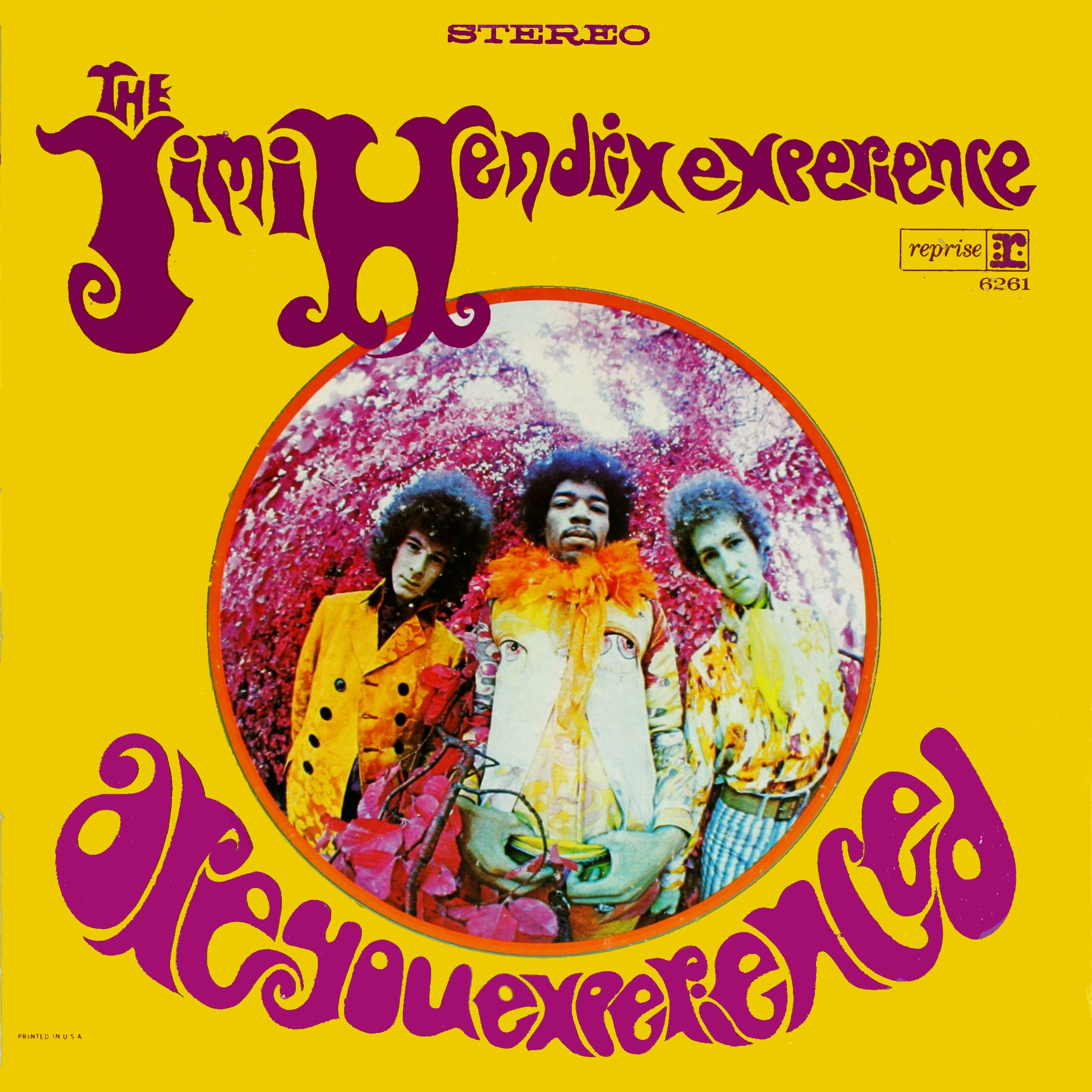
- North American cover by Reprise Records

Singles from Are You Experienced
- 1. "Hey Joe / Stone Free" Released: December 16, 1966 (UK); 2. "Purple Haze / 51st Anniversary" Released: March 17, 1967 (UK); 3. "Hey Joe / 51st Anniversary" Released: May 1, 1967 (US); 4. "The Wind Cries Mary / Highway Chile" Released: May 5, 1967 (UK); 5. "Purple Haze / The Wind Cries Mary" Released: June 19, 1967 (US); 6. "Foxy Lady / Hey Joe" Released: December 1967 (US)

Are You Experienced is the debut studio album by the Jimi Hendrix Experience, released in May 1967. The album was an immediate critical and commercial success, and is widely regarded as one of the greatest albums of all time. It features Jimi Hendrix's innovative approach to songwriting and electric guitar playing, which soon established a new direction in psychedelic and rock music as a whole.

After struggling to earn a living on the R&B circuit as a backing guitarist, Hendrix signed a management and production contract in 1966 with former Animals bassist Chas Chandler and ex-Animals manager Michael Jeffery. Chandler brought Hendrix to London and recruited members for the Jimi Hendrix Experience, a band designed to showcase the guitarist's talents. In late October, after having been rejected by Decca Records, the Experience signed with Track, a new label formed by the Who's managers Kit Lambert and Chris Stamp. Are You Experienced and its preceding singles were recorded over a five-month period from late October 1966 through early April 1967. The album was completed in 16 recording sessions at three London locations: De Lane Lea Studios, CBS Studios, and Olympic Studios.

Released in the UK on May 12, 1967, Are You Experienced spent 33 weeks on the British charts, peaking at number two. The album was issued in the US on August 23 by Reprise Records, where it reached number five on the US Billboard Top LPs chart, remaining on the chart for 106 weeks, 76 of those in the Top 40. The album also spent 70 weeks on the US Billboard Hot R&B LPs chart, where it peaked at number 10. The US version contained some of Hendrix's best known songs, including the Experience's first three singles, which, though omitted from the British edition of the LP, were top ten hits in the UK: "Purple Haze", "Hey Joe", and "The Wind Cries Mary". Hendrix was unhappy with the cover artwork for the UK edition, and solicited photographer Karl Ferris to create a more "psychedelic" cover for the US release.

In the decades since its release, Are You Experienced has continued to receive acclaim. It was voted number 63 in Colin Larkin's All Time Top 1000 Albums in 2000. In 2003, Rolling Stone ranked Are You Experienced 15th on its list of the "500 Greatest Albums of All Time"; it maintained the ranking in a 2012 revised list, and dropped to 30th in the 2020 edition. In 2010, the magazine placed four songs from the US version of the album on their list of the "500 Greatest Songs of All Time": "Purple Haze" (17), "Foxy Lady" (153), "Hey Joe" (201), and "The Wind Cries Mary" (379). In 2005, the album was one of 50 recordings chosen by the Library of Congress to be added to the National Recording Registry for being "culturally, historically, or aesthetically significant". Writer and archivist Reuben Jackson of the Smithsonian Institution wrote: "it's still a landmark recording because it is of the rock, R&B, blues ... musical tradition. It altered the syntax of the music ... in a way I compare to James Joyce's Ulysses."

== Background ==
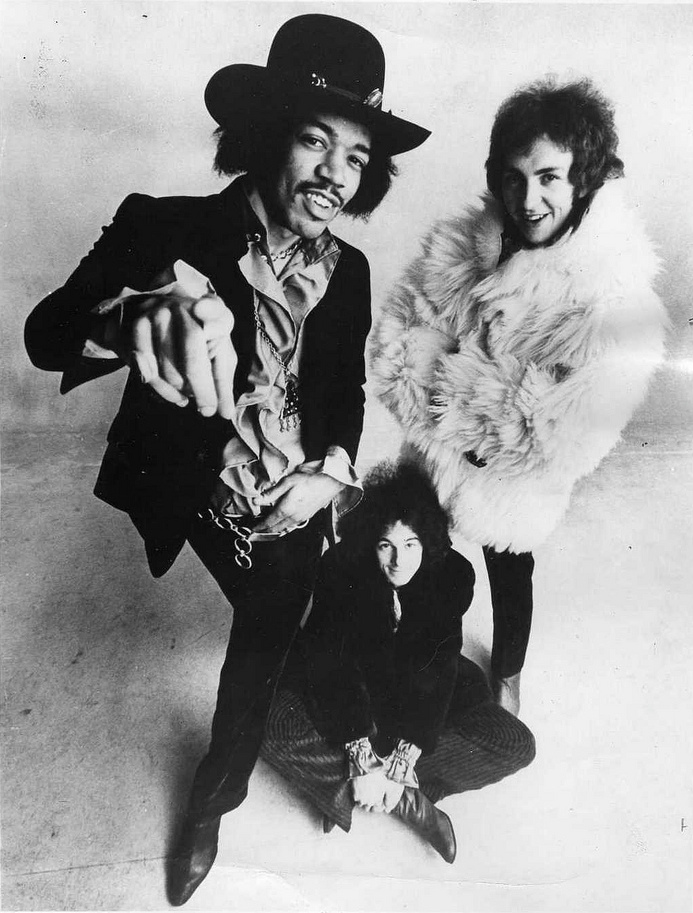
Jimi Hendrix, Mitch Mitchell and Noel Redding, 1968

By May 1966, Jimi Hendrix was struggling to earn a living playing the R&B circuit as a back-up guitarist. During a performance at one of New York City's most popular nightspots, the Cheetah Club, he was noticed by Linda Keith, the girlfriend of Rolling Stones guitarist Keith Richards. Shortly after, Hendrix relocated to the city's Greenwich Village and began a residency at the Cafe Wha? fronting his own band, Jimmy James and the Blue Flames. Keith recommended Hendrix to Stones manager Andrew Loog Oldham and producer Seymour Stein. They failed to see Hendrix's musical potential, and rejected him. She then referred him to Chas Chandler, who was leaving the Animals and interested in managing and producing artists. Chandler liked the Billy Roberts song "Hey Joe", and was convinced he could create a hit single with the right artist. Impressed with Hendrix's live version of the song with his band, he brought him to London on September 24, 1966, and signed him to a management and production contract with himself and ex-Animals manager Michael Jeffery.

Immediately following Hendrix's arrival in London, Chandler began recruiting members for a band, the Jimi Hendrix Experience, designed to showcase the guitarist's talents. Hendrix met the guitarist Noel Redding at an audition for the New Animals, where Redding's knowledge of blues progressions impressed Hendrix. Chandler asked Redding if he wanted to play bass guitar in Hendrix's band; Redding agreed. Chandler then began looking for a drummer and soon after, he contacted Mitch Mitchell through a mutual friend. Mitchell, who had recently been fired from Georgie Fame and the Blue Flames, participated in a rehearsal with Redding and Hendrix where they bonded over their shared interest in rhythm and blues. When Chandler phoned Mitchell later that day to offer him the position, he readily accepted. In late October, after having been rejected by Decca Records, the Experience signed with Track, a new label formed by the Who's managers Kit Lambert and Chris Stamp.

== Recording ==
Are You Experienced and its preceding singles were recorded over a five-month period from October 23, 1966, to April 4, 1967. The album was completed in 16 recording sessions at three London locations, including De Lane Lea Studios, CBS, and Olympic. Chandler booked many of the sessions at Olympic because the facility was acoustically superior and equipped with most of the latest technology, though it was still using four-track recorders, whereas American studios were using eight-track.

Chandler's budget was limited, so in an effort to reduce expenditures he and Hendrix completed much of the album's pre-production work at their shared apartment. From the start, Chandler intentionally minimized the creative input of Mitchell and Redding. He later explained: "I wasn't concerned that Mitch or Noel might feel that they weren't having enough—or any—say ... I had been touring and recording in a band for years, and I'd seen everything end as a compromise. Nobody ended up doing what they really wanted to do. I was not going to let that happen with Jimi." When the Experience began studio rehearsals, Hendrix already had the chord sequences and tempos worked out for Mitchell, and Chandler would direct Redding's bass parts.

=== October to December 1966 ===
Chandler and the Experience found time to record between performances in Europe. They began on October 23, recording "Hey Joe" at De Lane Lea Studios, with Chandler as producer and Dave Siddle as engineer. The song featured backing vocals by the Breakaways. Soon after the session began, Chandler asked Hendrix to turn his guitar amplifier down, and an argument ensued. Chandler commented: "Jimi threw a tantrum because I wouldn't let him play guitar loud enough ... He was playing a Marshall twin stack, and it was so loud in the studio that we were picking up various rattles and noises." According to Chandler, Hendrix then threatened to leave England, stating: "If I can't play as loud as I want, I might as well go back to New York." Chandler, who had Hendrix's immigration papers and passport in his back pocket, laid the documents on the mixing console and told Hendrix to "piss off". Hendrix laughed and said: "All right, you called my bluff", and they got back to work. Redding wrote in his diary that they completed two songs during the October 23 session, but the second one has never been positively identified. Author Sean Egan speculated that it might have been Howlin' Wolf's "Killing Floor" or Wilson Pickett's "Land of a Thousand Dances". Chandler decided that they should use an Experience original for the B-side of the single, so he encouraged Hendrix to start writing; he composed his first Experience song, "Stone Free", the following day. (Note: Hendrix earned his first composer credits for two instrumentals, "Hornet's Nest" and "Knock Yourself Out", released as a Curtis Knight and the Squires single in 1966. The original UK version of Are You Experienced was composed entirely of Hendrix originals.) Chandler, in an effort to minimize studio expenses, purchased rehearsal time at the Aberbach House in London. He abandoned this practice after realizing how quickly the group could learn songs while warming up in the studio. On November 2, 1966, the Experience returned to De Lane Lea to continue work on their first single. During the session, they recorded "Stone Free" and a demo version of "Can You See Me". This marked the first time that the Experience recorded a song that was eventually included on the original UK release of the album.

Chandler had been dissatisfied with the sound quality at De Lane Lea, so he took the advice of Kit Lambert and booked time at CBS Studios. On December 13, 1966, after taking a five-week break from recording while they performed in Europe, the Experience reconvened at CBS. (Note: During this break from recording, the Experience played eight shows in Germany and three in England.) Assisted by engineer Mike Ross, the band were especially productive during the session, recording instrumentation and vocals for "Foxy Lady" and basic instrumental tracks for "Love or Confusion", "Can You See Me", and "Third Stone from the Sun". Ross recalled the impact of Hendrix's Marshall stacks: "It was so loud you couldn't stand in the studio ... I'd never heard anything like it in my life." When Ross asked Hendrix where he would like the microphone placed Hendrix replied: "Oh, man, just put a mic about twelve feet away on the other side of the studio. It'll sound great." Ross agreed, and with a Neumann condenser mic he recorded Hendrix's guitar playing in a large room that, according to Ross, "was absolutely vital to the uniquely powerful Experience sound." Ross noted that input from Mitchell and Redding was minimized, and he asserted that Chandler was clearly "the one in charge" of the sessions. The band played together live at CBS; the lead and backup vocals were overdubbed. Despite his dwindling finances, Chandler encouraged the Experience to record numerous takes of a song, affording them the luxury of repeated attempts at a satisfactory recording. With a live instrument track as the foundation of the recordings, they eschewed the common practice of piecing together parts of several takes to make one continuous piece. After the December 13 recording session, the band made their television debut, on Britain's Ready Steady Go!

On December 15, 1966, finishing touches were made on the four rhythm tracks that were recorded the previous session. (Note: It is unclear if the four rhythm tracks recorded at CBS were completed on December 13. Ross recalled that two were completed on the 13th and two more on the 15th, but Redding wrote in his diary that Mitchell was not present on the 15th, and he also left some doubt as to whether or not the Experience recorded or rehearsed on December 15.) Although Chandler enjoyed working at CBS and he appreciated the high quality of the recordings they made there, he ended his professional connection with the studio after a disagreement between him and owner Jake Levy over his failure to make payment. Chandler had planned to pay Levy for the sessions after the album was completed, but Levy demanded payment upfront. Chandler viewed this as an unreasonable expectation, and he vowed that he would never again do business with CBS. (Note: Levy refused to release the recordings until Chandler had paid CBS in full.) The fifth and final song recorded there was "Red House". As stereophonic sound was not yet popular among music fans, these recordings were all monaural mixes; Ross explained: "back then ... mono was king. All the effort went into the mono." He estimated that they spent no more than 30 minutes mixing any one track. (Note: By mid-December, 1966, Mitchell had been late for several band rehearsals and recording sessions; he altogether failed to report to CBS on December 15. This provoked Hendrix and Redding to consider replacing him in the Experience. They auditioned a friend of Redding's, John Banks, and the audition went well enough that Hendrix and Redding offered Banks the position, but Banks, who was afraid of flying turned down the job to avoid the extensive air travel that would have been required of him. According to Redding, after Chandler docked Mitchell's weekly pay he was never late again.)

The first Experience single, with "Hey Joe" as the A-side and "Stone Free" as the B-side, was released in the UK on December 16, 1966. Track Records was not yet operational, so their distributor, Polydor Records, issued the single with their logo. It reached number six on the UK chart in early 1967. On December 21, 1966, Chandler and the Experience returned to De Lane Lea with Dave Siddle as engineer. They recorded two alternate versions of "Red House" and began work on "Remember"; both tracks were significantly re-worked in April 1967 at Olympic Studios.

=== January to April 1967 ===
==== January ====
After a three-week break from recording while they played gigs in England, including a December 29 appearance on Top of the Pops, the Experience reconvened at De Lane Lea on January 11, 1967. As "Hey Joe" was gaining chart momentum in the UK, they began working on their second single, which featured Hendrix's second songwriting effort, "Purple Haze", as its A-side. The track presented a more complex arrangement than the band's previous recordings, and required four hours of studio time to complete, which Chandler considered extravagant. The session was the first time that he and the group had experimented with guitar effects. Acoustic engineer Roger Mayer introduced Hendrix to the Octavia, an octave-doubling effect pedal, in December 1966, and he first recorded with the effect during the guitar solo of "Purple Haze". When Track Records sent the master tapes for "Purple Haze" to Reprise for remastering, they wrote on the tape box: "Deliberate distortion. Do not correct."

At the same January 11 session the Experience worked on the single's B-side, "51st Anniversary", a song that marked their first use of overdubbing in lieu of retakes as a method of achieving a satisfactory track. Chandler explained: "There were five guitar overdubs all linking in together to sound like one guitar." The song, which Redding and Mitchell had not yet heard before that day, was completed during the session. Chandler had decided that they should discard the rough version of "Third Stone from the Sun" from December 13 and re-record the song; they completed a basic track for the piece, but were unable to achieve a finished master. The group also managed to produce an acceptable live recording of the basic track for "Fire" after seven takes. Next, they attempted Hendrix's newly written ballad, "The Wind Cries Mary". Without the benefit of rehearsals, the band recorded the song in one take, to which Hendrix added several guitar overdubs; Chandler estimated that they spent approximately 20 minutes on the completed rhythm track. According to Chandler, by this time Redding and Mitchell had begun to complain about their limited input. Chandler explained that financial considerations influenced the creative dynamic: "[They] were sort of fighting the fact that they had no say during recording sessions ... they were starting to come up with suggestions, but ... We didn't need to be arguing with Noel for ten minutes and Mitch for five ... We just couldn't afford the time."

Between January 12 and February 2, 1967, the Experience took a break from recording while they played 20 dates in England, including a second appearance on Top of the Pops, on January 18. Chandler was dissatisfied with the sound quality of the January 11 recordings and frustrated by the large number of noise complaints that they had received from people living and working near De Lane Lea. He explained: "There was a bank above the studio ... and it was at the time when computers were just coming in ... we would play so loud that it would foul up the computers upstairs." Brian Jones and Bill Wyman of the Rolling Stones encouraged Chandler to try Olympic Studios, which was considered the top independent London studio. Despite the growing chart success of their first single, Chandler's financial problems persisted. Olympic required advance payment for studio time, but Polydor had not yet released any funds to Track for disbursement. When Chandler went to Polydor asking for relief they responded by guaranteeing him a line of credit at Olympic.

==== February ====
I would fill the four basic tracks with stereo drums on two of the channels, the bass on the third, and Jimi's rhythm guitar on the fourth. From there, Chandler and I would mix this down to two tracks on another four-track recorder, giving us two more tracks to put on whatever we wanted, which usually included Jimi's lead guitar and vocals as well as backing vocals and some additional percussion.

— Eddie Kramer

With his budget concerns alleviated, Chandler booked time at Olympic, where on February 3, 1967, he and the Experience met sound engineer Eddie Kramer. During Kramer's first session with the group, he deviated from the standard recording method that they had been using at CBS and De Lane Lea, which was to record bass and drums in mono on two tracks. He instead recorded Mitchell's drums on two tracks in stereo, leaving the remaining two tracks available for Redding's bass and rhythm guitar parts played by Hendrix. Kramer's unorthodox approach, which was inspired by Hendrix's complaints regarding the limitations of four-track recordings, captured the live sound of the band using all four available tracks. (Note: Before traveling to the UK, Hendrix had worked with eight-track recorders in the US. According to Kramer, he wanted to hear the basic rhythm parts across all four tracks, which inspired Kramer to experiment with reduction mixing.) Kramer and Chandler then pre-mixed and reduced the first four tracks down to two, making two more tracks available for lead guitar overdubs and vocals. This method satisfied both Hendrix's perfectionism and Chandler's desire to reduce the number of takes required for a satisfactory rhythm track, thus minimizing their expenses. Another change instigated by Kramer was the use of a mixture of close and distant microphone placements when recording Hendrix's guitar parts whereas, during previous sessions, the microphones had been placed about twelve feet away from Hendrix's amplifiers. In addition to the usual choices, Kramer used Beyerdynamic M 160 ribbon microphones, which were typically not used to record loud music.

During the February 3, 1967, session at Olympic, the Experience improved the January 11 master tape of "Purple Haze" by re-recording the vocal and lead guitar parts, and adding another Octavia guitar overdub, which was sped-up and panned at the end of the song. The group reconvened at Olympic on February 7, continuing their work on "Purple Haze" by recording Hendrix's rhythm guitar and vocal parts, as well as Redding's background vocals. They spent time overdubbing ambient background sounds by playing tapes through a set of headphones that were held near a microphone, creating an echo effect as the headphones were moved closer; they completed a final mix of "Purple Haze" the following day. During the session, they worked on the De Lane Lea master tape of "Fire", replacing everything except Redding's bass line, which he double-tracked in an effort to accentuate the recording's lower frequencies. Kramer placed the second bass line on a dedicated track and blended Redding's original bass line with Mitchell's newly recorded drum part. They also recorded Mitchell and Redding's backing vocals. "Foxy Lady" was also reworked on February 8; Redding recorded a new bass line and Hendrix and Mitchell added overdubs to their existing parts. After recording backing vocals by Redding and lead vocals from Hendrix, Kramer prepared the song's final mix.

Hendrix was not as confident a singer as he was a guitarist, and because he strongly disliked anyone watching him sing he asked the engineers at Olympic to construct a privacy barrier between him and the control room. This created problems when the studio lights were low, and the engineers were unable to see him, making his visual cues and prompts difficult to communicate. As was the case at De Lane Lea, Hendrix's penchant for using multiple amplifiers at extreme volume drew criticism and complaints from the people living and working near to the studio. Olympic tape operator George Chkiantz recalled: "Sometimes, it got so loud we'd turn the [control booth] monitors off and there was really very little difference." Chkiantz noted that reactions to Hendrix's music were not always positive: "I seem to recall a lot of musicians, a lot of people, saying, 'I can't see what all the fuss is about myself', or 'I don't know how you listen to all that noise; I'd be scared to work with him' ... Chas was convinced that he was on to something. Not everyone was convinced that Chas was right." Another issue that complicated the sessions were the large number of female fans who would show up at the studio wanting to watch the Experience record. As a habit, Hendrix would indiscriminately tell people where they would be on any given day, which led to large groups of fans following him everywhere. Olympic employees were tasked with keeping them under control and at a safe distance so as to not unduly burden the recording process. Chkiantz commented: "It was extraordinary. I worked with the Stones. I worked with the Beatles. I worked with Led Zeppelin. I was not as jumpy; it was not as difficult as with Hendrix. It was something of an open house. Hendrix was not difficult at all, but I personally would have preferred not to have loads of girls lurking in the woodwork."

On February 20, 1967, the Experience continued working on Are You Experienced, but scheduling conflicts at Olympic led Chandler to book time at De Lane Lea. During the session they recorded "I Don't Live Today", which featured a manual wah effect that predated the pedal unit. They managed to complete a working master by the end of the day, though Hendrix eventually recorded a new lead vocal at Olympic.

==== March and April ====
The Experience took a week break from recording while playing gigs in England, and returned to De Lane Lea on March 1, 1967, to attempt a studio recording of Bob Dylan's "Like a Rolling Stone". Although the song had long been a staple of the group's live show, they failed to achieve an acceptable basic track, owing mostly to Mitchell's inability to keep consistent time during the session.

The second Experience single, "Purple Haze"/"51st Anniversary", was released on March 1. It entered the UK singles chart on the 23rd, peaking at number three. During that month, the band took another long break from recording while they played gigs in Belgium, Germany, and the UK, including appearances on the UK television show Dee Time and the BBC Radio show Saturday Club. Scheduling conflicts at Olympic led Chandler to book a March 29 session at De Lane Lea. On this date the band worked on another newly written Hendrix composition, "Manic Depression"; they finished a rough mix by the end of the session that was later rejected in favor of a re-mix completed at Olympic. On April 3, the Experience returned to Olympic, adding overdubs and completing final mixes on several unfinished masters. During the eight-hour session, the band recorded three new songs, including "Highway Chile", "May This Be Love", and "Are You Experienced?". As the album's title track featured backwards rhythm guitar, bass, and drums, replication of the beat caused Mitchell some consternation when attempting the song live. (Note: Hendrix had experimented with the possibilities of backwards instruments on his reel-to-reel tape machine, mastering the technique after hours of private application.) Chandler completed final mixes for "I Don't Live Today", "Are You Experienced?", and "May This Be Love" before the end of a session that Kramer described as "very organized."

In an effort to free up space for Hendrix's lead vocals, further reduction mixing was completed for "Are You Experienced?" during a session at Olympic on April 4, 1967. With the title track complete, the Experience shifted their focus to the January 11 rough demo of "Third Stone from the Sun". Chandler decided that they should discard the original De Lane Lea tape and record a new version of the song. During the session, Kramer prepared a reduction mix of "Highway Chile", which made two tracks available for Hendrix's lead guitar and vocal overdubs. Though stereo and mono mixes were completed for the song, Chandler preferred the mono version, which he paired with "The Wind Cries Mary" for release as the group's third UK single. A reduction mix was prepared for "Love or Confusion", and Hendrix took advantage of the newly vacant tracks by adding lead guitar and vocals. A final mix was completed before the end of the session. On April 5, Chandler participated in a mastering session at Rye Muse Studios for "Highway Chile" and "The Wind Cries Mary", during which preparations were made so that Track could begin manufacturing records. On the 10th, he and the Experience returned to Olympic, spending the bulk of the session on editing dialogue segments for "Third Stone from the Sun", which were then slowed down and mixed into the song. Kramer concentrated his efforts on the song's complicated mix: "The song was like a watercolor painting ... each track was composed of four, fairly dense composite images."

After the April 10, 1967, recording session, the Experience spent the next two weeks playing shows and attending promotional appearances in England, including a spot on the BBC television program Monday Monday and BBC2's Late Night Line-Up. Chandler, Hendrix, and Kramer completed the final mixing of Are You Experienced at Olympic by 3 a.m. on April 25. Chandler had agreed to audition the finished LP for Polydor's head of A&R, Horst Schmaltze, at 11 a.m., so after a few hours of sleep he prepared a suitable acetate demo and traveled to Polydor. Chandler recalled: "As Horst started to put the needle on the record, I broke out in a cold sweat, thinking ... when he hears this, he's going to order the men in white coats to take me away ... Horst played the first side through and didn't say a word. Then he turned the disk over and played the other side. I started thinking about how I was going to talk my way out of this. At the end of the second side, he just sat there. Finally, he said, 'This is brilliant. This is the greatest thing I've ever heard.'" Horst immediately became an ardent supporter of the album and the band, championing the marketing and distribution of their debut LP.

== Music and lyrics ==
Much of what Jimi did with the guitar translated the R&B-blues-soul sensibility to the psychedelic age.

— Ritchie Unterberger, 2009

According to Hendrix biographer Harry Shapiro, the music on Are You Experienced incorporates a variety of music genres from rhythm and blues to free jazz; author Peter Doggett noted its "wide variety of styles", while journalist Chris Welch said "each track has a different personality". Musicologist Gilbert Chase asserted that the album "marked a high peak in hard rock", and music critic Jim DeRogatis characterized the LP and its preceding singles as "raw, focused psychedelic rock," which he compared to the music on the compilation album Nuggets. In congruence, Michael Gallucci Ultimate Classic Rock assessed the album as defining the psychedelic rock genre more than any other. A contemporary review published in Newsweek in October 1967 identified the influence of soul music on the Experience and the album. In 1989, Hit Parader magazine ranked it number 35 in a list of the top 100 heavy metal albums. In 2006, writer and archivist Reuben Jackson of the Smithsonian Institution wrote: "it's still a landmark recording because it is of the rock, R&B, blues ... musical tradition. It altered the syntax of the music ... in a way I compare to, say, James Joyce's Ulysses."

Included on the UK edition of Are You Experienced were two tracks that represented the music Hendrix had played in the US before the formation of the Experience: the blues track "Red House" and the rhythm and blues song "Remember". The album's psychedelic title track, which author Sean Egan described as impressionistic, featured the post-modern soundscapes of backwards guitar and drums that pre-date scratching by 10 years. Musicologist Ritchie Unterberger considers the lyrics to "I Don't Live Today" to be more at home in a gothic rock setting than in psychedelia, however; he describes the music as being "played and sung with an ebullience that belies the darkness of the lyrics." The song's tribal rhythms served as a platform for Hendrix's innovative guitar feedback improvisations. (Note: In honor of his Cherokee heritage, Hendrix dedicated the song to the American Indians and other minority groups.) Whereas "Fire" is a funk and soul hybrid driven by Mitchell's drumming, "May This Be Love" and "The Wind Cries Mary" are soft ballads that demonstrate Hendrix's ability to write thoughtful lyrics and subtle melodies. The influence of raga rock can be heard in his sitar-like guitar solo on "Love or Confusion". "Can You See Me" is an uptempo rocker that features Hendrix's double tracked vocals and his use of a one-note bend in the style of Hank Marvin. Although "Hey Joe" is a folk song, and the only cover on the album, it would become one of Hendrix's most requested tracks.

The UK edition of Are You Experienced opened with "Foxy Lady", a track that, with the exception of a few overdubs, was recorded in one session at CBS. Hendrix wrote the song about Heather Taylor, a London socialite who later married the Who's Roger Daltrey. It begins with the fade-in of an F note that Hendrix is bending-up to F sharp while applying generous finger vibrato. Using his guitar's control knob, he slowly increases volume until an audio feedback loop develops and he slides into the song's implied dominant seventh sharp ninth chord. (Note: Musical notation by Hal Leonard contributors identifies the chord as a "F♯m7 chord", also known as a "major minor seventh chord" or dominant seventh chord (no ♯9). Others, including Roby, identify it as a 7♯9 chord.) Hendrix used a combination of natural amplifier overdrive and fuzz box effects units to create the song's razor-sharp guitar tone. Its blues–inspired solo—his fourth since arriving in England—used pentatonic scales while showcasing his innovative approach to melody; by exploiting the increased sustain created by overdriving his amplifiers, he moved seamlessly between the middle and high registers with a fluid, singing tone. Author Peter Doggett compared its slow beat to Memphis soul; David Stubbs described the track as a prototype for heavy metal bands such as Black Sabbath.

"Purple Haze"
The intro and opening riff

Although the lyrics to "Purple Haze", which opened the US edition of Are You Experienced, are often misinterpreted as describing an acid trip, Hendrix explained: "[It] was all about a dream I had that I was walking under the sea." He speculated that the dream may have been inspired by a science fiction story about a purple death ray. (Note: The magazine was Fantasy and Science Fiction, and the story was a condensed form of a 1957 novel by Philip José Farmer, titled Night of Light: Day of Dreams.) Redding stated that Hendrix had not yet taken LSD at the time of the song's writing, which was after a gig in London on December 26, 1966. (Note: According to authors Harry Shapiro and Caesar Glebbeek, the earliest that Hendrix is known to have ingested LSD was in June 1967, while at the Monterey Pop Festival.) The first draft of the lyrics was exceedingly long, so Chandler and Hendrix reduced its length to something appropriate for mainstream pop music. It opens with a guitar/bass harmony in the interval of a tritone. In the opinion of the author Ritchie Unterberger, the opening riff has "become a permanent part of rock's vocabulary." Whereas Rolling Stone described the song as the beginning of late-1960s psychedelia, the authors Harry Shapiro and Caesar Glebbeek identified Hendrix's use of R&B, funk, and soul elements in the track.

"Third Stone from the Sun"
A spoken passage from the second section

In 1967, Hendrix told the journalist Keith Altham that "Third Stone from the Sun" is about a visiting space alien who, upon evaluation of the human species, decides that people are not fit to rule Earth, destroys their civilization, and places the planet in the care of chickens. The song is composed of two contrasting sections, one that features a jazzy guitar melody played in the style of Wes Montgomery over a straightforward rock tempo, and another that showcases Hendrix's free-form mixolydian mode guitar lines with a jazz beat. The track contains no proper vocals, instead using spoken words played at half-speed to invoke images of interstellar space travel. In addition to jazz elements, Unterberger identified Hendrix's use of surf music motifs in the track that are reminiscent of earlier works by the Ventures, a group from the Pacific Northwest that Hendrix would have heard during his childhood.

Hendrix described "Manic Depression" as "ugly times music"; during a live performance he explained the meaning of the lyrics: "It's a story about a cat wishing he could make love to music instead of the same old everyday woman." The song is unusual in that it's written in triple meter, or 3/4 time, which is the time signature commonly associated with a waltz; most rock music is written in 4/4. Although his delivery is rock oriented, Mitchell's drumming on the track is reminiscent of Elvin Jones's fluid jazz patterns. Musicologist Andy Aledort noted Hendrix's "dramatic use of chromaticism" during the song's opening bars and the "heavily vibratoed unison bends" that presage what he described as one of Hendrix's best guitar solos.

"The Wind Cries Mary" is the first ballad recorded by the Experience; Hendrix wrote the lyrics after an argument with his girlfriend, Kathy Etchingham, whose middle name is Mary. She explained: "I smashed plates on the floor, [and] he swept them up. He locked me in the bathroom for absolutely ages and ... eventually Chas's girlfriend Lotta let me out ... I ran out to get a taxi and was standing under the traffic lights, and I had red hair and a red dress. I went back after I'd cooled down and he'd already written it." The song featured a chord progression inspired by Curtis Mayfield and lyrics that reflected Hendrix's admiration of Bob Dylan. "Stone Free" expressed Hendrix's desire to preserve his personal freedom, demurring the concepts of conformity and long-term relationships. He revisited this theme in "51st Anniversary" and "Highway Chile". Omitted from the American version of the album, "Red House" did not see an official release in the US until the 1969 compilation Smash Hits. An unusual feature of the recording is that it does not include a bass guitar track; Redding instead played rhythm guitar with his equalization set strongly in favor of bass tones. It is Hendrix's only original twelve-bar blues.

== Album cover ==
Chris Stamp designed the cover of the UK version of Are You Experienced, which featured a picture of Hendrix, Mitchell, and Redding by Bruce Fleming. The image shows Hendrix wearing a long dark cape while standing over Mitchell and Redding, striking what Egan described as a "Dracula-esque pose". Chandler contacted Fleming based on the photographer's previous work with the Hollies, the Dave Clark Five, and the Animals. The photo shoot took place in February after Fleming had attended several recording sessions and Experience gigs. Chandler made a point of requesting that the band member's faces be clearly visible in the photograph; Fleming explained: "[Album covers] got much more esoteric as time went on, but to establish the artist we had to get their faces across so the kids would recognize them." He took monochrome and color shots of the band; Track selected an image from the latter group. Fleming had indicated which picture he preferred they use, marking the shot with a cross, but after the album's release he realized that they had selected another, less desirable image. According to Fleming, the shot that he chose was "more sinister; more interesting". Stamp hired graphic artist Alan Aldridge to design the sleeve's psychedelic lettering. Track inexplicably put only the album's title on the cover, omitting the band's name; Polydor issued the release throughout Europe with Hendrix's name printed at the top in matching font. The cover art's combination of dull green and brown tones, juxtaposed with the jocular nature of the subject's pose, created a weak overall visual impression; Stamp commented: "It's not a great cover at all. Hopefully, we made up for that in all the other covers."

Hendrix disliked the UK cover of Are You Experienced, so arrangements were made for a photo shoot with graphic designer Karl Ferris. Hendrix wanted "something psychedelic", so he requested Ferris because he appreciated the photographer's sleeve-work on the Hollies' June 1967 release Evolution. During a meeting with the band, Ferris told Hendrix that he wanted to hear more of their music from which to draw inspiration. They accommodated his request by allowing him to attend several sessions for their second album, Axis: Bold as Love. Ferris brought home tapes from the sessions, which along with Are You Experienced he listened to intently. His first impression of the music was that it was "so far out that it seemed to come from outer space", which inspired him to develop a backstory about a "group travelling through space in a Biosphere on their way to bring their unworldly space music to earth." With this concept in mind, he took color photographs of the band at Kew Gardens in London, using a fisheye lens which was then popular in Mod sub-culture. Ferris used what Egan described as "an infrared technique of his own invention which combined color reversal with heat signature", further enhancing the exotic nature of the image. Ferris was an experienced fashion photographer, and his interest in the finer details of his covers led him to choose the band's wardrobe. After seeing Hendrix with his hair combed away from the scalp, Ferris requested that he wear it that way during the photo shoot. Hendrix's girlfriend, Kathy Etchingham, trimmed his hair to improve its symmetry, forming an afro that became the basis of a homogenized Experience image. Redding and Mitchell liked Hendrix's new hairstyle, so Ferris hired a hairdresser to style their hair in a similar fashion. After purchasing clothing for Redding and Mitchell at the boutiques on King's Road—Hendrix wore clothes from his wardrobe, including a psychedelic jacket with a pair of eyes printed on the front which had been given to him by a fan—the Experience travelled to Kew Gardens. In an effort to focus on Hendrix's hands, Ferris shot the band at a low angle. The daylight faded soon after their arrival at the garden, so they returned the following day for a second shoot, which was not needed; the image selected for the US cover of Are You Experienced was the first shot taken the previous day. Ferris chose the cover's yellow background and its surreal lettering, and he intended for a textured gatefold jacket that Reprise, as a cost-saving measure, did not approve. (Note: The back of the sleeve featured a monochrome image of the Experience.)

== Release ==
=== Europe ===
Front cover of the album Are You Experienced? released by Barclay Records in France and Benelux

The third Experience single, "The Wind Cries Mary" backed by "Highway Chile", was released in the UK on May 5, 1967, while "Purple Haze" occupied the number three spot in the charts. The management's decision to release the single while the previous one was still present in the UK charts was unorthodox, as was the choice of "The Wind Cries Mary", which differed greatly from "Purple Haze". Stamp recalled: "We did that on purpose ... We wanted musically to show who this person was." Egan wrote: "It alerted the public to the fact that the so-called Wild Man of Borneo was capable of songs of delicacy and sensitivity." "The Wind Cries Mary" reached number six in the UK in May.

Track Records released Are You Experienced in the UK on May 12, 1967. (Note: Track released Are You Experienced two weeks ahead of schedule when its distributor, Polydor, erred by shipping 2,000 copies to London music stores.) It entered the charts on May 27, where it spent 33 weeks, peaking at number two. It remained in the charts long enough that it was still present when the Experience released their second album, Axis: Bold as Love. The album, which was released in the UK without the first three singles, was prevented from reaching the top spot by the Beatles' Sgt. Pepper's Lonely Hearts Club Band. (Note: When Are You Experienced was released in the UK on May 12, 1967, the soundtrack to The Sound of Music occupied the number one spot.)

In France and the Benelux countries, Hendrix's recordings were released by Barclay Records in a distribution deal secured by Jeffery.

=== North America ===
Although popular in Europe at the time, the Experience's first US single, "Hey Joe", failed to reach the Billboard Hot 100 chart upon its release on May 1, 1967. The group's fortunes improved when Paul McCartney recommended them to the organizers of the Monterey Pop Festival. He insisted that the event would be incomplete without Hendrix, whom he called "an absolute ace on the guitar", and he agreed to join the board of organizers on the condition that the Experience perform at the festival in mid-June. During the climax of the festival, which was filmed by D. A. Pennebaker for the documentary Monterey Pop, Hendrix burned and smashed his guitar on stage for dramatic effect.

After the show-stealing performance, Reprise Records agreed to distribute Are You Experienced. However, despite the increased awareness that the Experience's performance at Monterey provided, the second Experience single, "Purple Haze" / "The Wind Cries Mary", released in the US on August 16, 1967, stalled at number 65 on the Billboard Hot 100. Although the single performed poorly in the US charts, its presence on underground FM radio stations, which were transitioning from easy listening and classical music formats to album cuts, significantly aided sales of the LP. Reprise allocated a $20,000 promotional budget for the LP, which was an unprecedented amount for an unproven artist. Released in the US on August 23 by Reprise, Are You Experienced reached number five on the Billboard Top LPs chart. The album remained on Billboard's album chart for 106 weeks, 76 of those in the Top 40. The North American edition of Are You Experienced featured a new cover by Karl Ferris and a new track list, with Reprise omitting "Red House", "Remember", and "Can You See Me", and including the first three A-sides omitted from the UK release: "Hey Joe", "Purple Haze", and "The Wind Cries Mary".

== Reception and legacy ==
Retrospective professional reviews
Review scores
Source	Rating
AllMusic	5/5 stars
Blender	5/5 stars
DownBeat	5/5 stars
The Encyclopedia of Popular Music	5/5 stars
The Great Rock Discography	10/10
MusicHound Rock	5/5 stars
Pitchfork	10/10
PopMatters	10/10
The Rolling Stone Album Guide	5/5 stars
Tom Hull – on the Web	A−

Are You Experienced was an immediate commercial success, selling more than one million copies within seven months of its release. Reviewing the album in 1967, Melody Maker praised its artistic integrity and the Experience's varied use of tempo. NME's Keith Altham said it is "a brave effort by Hendrix to produce a musical form which is original and exciting". However, not all contemporary writers gave the LP a favorable review; in November 1967, Rolling Stone's Jon Landau wrote that although he considered Hendrix a "great guitarist and a brilliant arranger", he disapproved of his singing and songwriting. He criticized the quality of the material and described the lyrics as inane: "Above all this record is unrelentingly violent, and lyrically, inartistically violent at that."

Many music critics have since named Are You Experienced as one of the greatest debut albums in rock music and of all time. According to Associated Press writer Hillel Italie, it was among the notable debuts in a year that marked rock music's transition into the album era. Journalist Ritchie Unterberger described it as "one of the definitive albums of the psychedelic era", while author Chris Smith said the release was "a landmark in a summer of landmark albums". Noe Goldwasser, the founding editor of Guitar World magazine, called it "a veritable textbook of what a musician can do with his instrument" and "the measure by which everything ... in rock and roll has been compared since." Michael Gallucci of Ultimate Classic Rock wrote that "by the end of the senses-rattling title track, it pretty much set up a template on which an entire music movement was based." According to music journalist Charles Shaar Murray, the album "completely changed notions of what a guitar could sound like, or indeed, what music could sound like", while the Miami Herald credited Are You Experienced with introducing acid rock, classic rock, and the guitar aesthetic of heavy metal. Critic Robert Christgau called it a "bombshell debut" in his review for Blender and said its songs were innovative for how they utilized three-minute pop structures as a medium for Hendrix's unprecedentedly heavy and turbulent guitar and loud, powerful hooks, which greatly appealed to young listeners.

Rolling Stone includes the album and several songs on various "best of" lists, such as:

- 500 Greatest Albums of All Time – No. 30, calling it an "epochal debut", and praising Hendrix's "exploitation of amp howl", and characterizing his guitar playing as "incendiary ... historic in itself". (2020)
- 500 Greatest Songs of All Time – "Purple Haze" (No. 17), "Foxy Lady" (No. 153), "Hey Joe" (No. 201), and "The Wind Cries Mary" (No. 379). (2011)
- Best Debut Albums of All Time – No. 3, crediting it as the LP "that established the transcendent promise of psychedelia", stating: "Every idea we have of the guitarist as groundbreaking individual artist comes from this record." (2013)

Additionally, Mojo magazine listed Are You Experienced as the greatest guitar album of all time in 2013. In 2005, Are You Experienced was one of 50 recordings chosen by the Library of Congress to be added to the National Recording Registry, which annually selects recordings that are "culturally, historically, or aesthetically significant". The album was also included in "A Basic Record Library" of 1950s and 1960s recordings—published in Christgau's Record Guide: Rock Albums of the Seventies (1981)—and in the book 1001 Albums You Must Hear Before You Die.

== Track listing ==
Since the first release of Are You Experienced in 1967, there have been six different track listings. Since 1997, compact disc editions in the US and UK feature 17 tracks, including all songs that appeared on either the original UK/international edition of the album or the original North American edition, as well as the Experience's first three singles ("Hey Joe" b/w "Stone Free", "Purple Haze" b/w "51st Anniversary", and "The Wind Cries Mary" b/w "Highway Chile").

=== Original UK and international edition ===
The original UK Track album did not list running times for the songs. Instead, they are taken from the original international Polydor edition. All tracks written by Jimi Hendrix.

Side one
No.	Title	Length
1.	"Foxy Lady"	3:10
2.	"Manic Depression"	3:31
3.	"Red House"	3:45
4.	"Can You See Me"	2:35
5.	"Love or Confusion"	3:05
6.	"I Don't Live Today"	3:48

Side two
No.	Title	Length
1.	"May This Be Love"	2:55
2.	"Fire"	2:30
3.	"3rd Stone from the Sun"	6:30
4.	"Remember"	2:43
5.	"Are You Experienced"	4:02
Total length:		38:34

=== Original North American edition ===
The listings are taken from the original US Reprise album. All tracks written by Jimi Hendrix, except where noted.

Side one
No.	Title	Length
1.	"Purple Haze"	2:46
2.	"Manic Depression"	3:30
3.	"Hey Joe" (Billy Roberts)	3:23
4.	"Love or Confusion"	3:15
5.	"May This Be Love"	2:55
6.	"I Don't Live Today"	3:55

Side two
No.	Title	Length
1.	"The Wind Cries Mary"	3:21
2.	"Fire"	2:34
3.	"Third Stone from the Sun" (US edition spelling)	6:40
4.	"Foxey Lady" (US edition spelling)	3:15
5.	"Are You Experienced?"	3:55
Total length:		39:29

=== CD releases ===
Are You Experienced was first issued on the Compact Disc Digital Audio or CD format in 1985 by Polydor Records (Track's successor) in Europe and Reprise in the US. These early CDs essentially copied the original LP record albums and used the same tracks, sequencing, and cover art as their 1967 counterparts. Both were reissued with minor changes in 1989–1991 and the Reprise release CD sleeve included "Digital re-mastering by Joe Gastwirt, assisted by Dave Mitson using the Sonic Solutions NoNoise System, under the supervision of Are You Experienced? Ltd."

In 1993, Alan Douglas, who managed Hendrix's recording catalogue, reached an agreement with MCA Records for the future releases of Hendrix material. He also announced plans for new reissues of the three Experience albums: "Everything in the present catalogue is a budget release ... They're all 25-year-old packages. I want to take it high-level ... with all these new elements". Along with new artwork and liner notes, the MCA reissue was remastered with only one track selection and order for both the European and America markets. The 17-track CD included the first three Experience British singles (both A-sides and B-sides), followed by the 11 songs as they appeared on the Track/Polydor UK album release.

The 1993 Douglas reissues were short-lived; in 1997, his tenure as the overseer of Hendrix's catalogue was taken over by Experience Hendrix (the Hendrix family-controlled company). By April 1997, a new reissue was released, which restored the original artwork and sequencing for both the US and UK releases. However, both reissues included an additional six tracks, which provided the same 17 tracks (all the original singles and album tracks) in the UK and US, although in a different order. Since 1997, these have been the official authorized CD versions of the original albums. In 2010, Sony's Legacy Recordings became the exclusive distributor for the recordings managed by Experience Hendrix.

All tracks are written by Jimi Hendrix, except where noted.

UK and international CD reissue bonus tracks (1997–present)
No.	Title	Length
12.	"Hey Joe" (Billy Roberts)	3:30
13.	"Stone Free"	3:36
14.	"Purple Haze"	2:51
15.	"51st Anniversary"	3:15
16.	"The Wind Cries Mary"	3:20
17.	"Highway Chile"	3:32
Total length:		20:04

North American CD reissue bonus tracks (1997–present)
No.	Title	Length
12.	"Stone Free"	3:36
13.	"51st Anniversary"	3:15
14.	"Highway Chile"	3:32
15.	"Can You See Me"	2:33
16.	"Remember"	2:48
17.	"Red House"	3:50
Total length:		19:34

== Personnel ==
The Jimi Hendrix Experience

- Jimi Hendrix – guitars, vocals; piano on "Are You Experienced?"
- Noel Redding – bass guitar (except on "Red House"); rhythm guitar on "Red House"; backing vocals on "Foxy Lady," "Fire" and "Purple Haze"
- Mitch Mitchell – drums; percussion on "Stone Free" and "Can You See Me"; backing vocals on "Fire"

Additional personnel

- The Breakaways – backing vocals on "Hey Joe"
- Chas Chandler – producer
- Dave Siddle – engineering on "Manic Depression", "Can You See Me", "Love or Confusion", "I Don't Live Today", "Fire", "Remember", "Hey Joe", "Stone Free", "Purple Haze", "51st Anniversary", and "The Wind Cries Mary"
- Eddie Kramer – engineering on "The Wind Cries Mary", "Are You Experienced?", and "Red House"; additional engineering on "Love or Confusion", "Fire", "Third Stone from the Sun", and "Highway Chile"
- Mike Ross – engineering on "Foxy Lady", "Red House", and "Third Stone from the Sun"

== Charts ==
Chart performance for Are You Experienced
Chart (1967–1968)	Peak position
Canada RPM Top 50 Albums	15
Germany Charts	17
Norway Charts	3
UK Official Charts	2
US Billboard Top LPs	5
US Top R&B Albums	10

== Certifications ==
Certifications for Are You Experienced
Region	Certification	Certified units/sales
Italy (FIMI) sales since 2009	Gold	25,000^{‡}
New Zealand (RMNZ)	Gold	7,500^{‡}
United Kingdom (BPI) sales since 1997	Gold	100,000^{^}
United States (RIAA)	6× Platinum	6,000,000^{‡}
^{^} Shipments figures based on certification alone.^{‡} Sales+streaming figures based on certification alone.

== Sources ==
- Aledort, Andy (1996). Jimi Hendrix: A Step-by-Step Breakdown of his Guitar Styles and Techniques. Hal Leonard. ISBN 978-0-7935-3659-7.
- Altham, Keith (1996) [1967]. "Hendrix is Out of This World". In Potash, Chris (ed.). The Jimi Hendrix Companion. Omnibus. ISBN 978-0-7119-6635-2.
- Anon. (1992). "Seattle Sampler". The Miami Herald. No. September 26. Living Today section. Archived from the original on February 27, 2017.(subscription required)
- Black, Johnny (1999). Jimi Hendrix: The Ultimate Experience. Thunder's Mouth Press. ISBN 978-1-56025-240-5.
- Christgau, Robert (1998). Grown Up All Wrong: 75 Great Rock and Pop Artists from Vaudeville to Techno. Harvard University Press. ISBN 978-0-674-44318-1.
- Cross, Charles R. (2005). Room Full of Mirrors: A Biography of Jimi Hendrix. Hyperion. ISBN 978-0-7868-8841-2.
- Doggett, Peter (2004). Jimi Hendrix: The Complete Guide to his Music. Omnibus. ISBN 978-1-84449-424-8.
- Egan, Sean (2013). Jimi Hendrix and the making of Are You Experienced (updated and expanded ed.). Askill. ISBN 978-0-9545750-5-2.
- George-Warren, Holly, ed. (2001). The Rolling Stone Encyclopedia of Rock & Roll (2005 revised and updated ed.). Fireside. ISBN 978-0-7432-9201-6.
- Heatley, Michael (2009). Jimi Hendrix Gear: The Guitars, Amps & Effects that Revolutionized Rock 'n' Roll. Voyageur Press. ISBN 978-0-7603-3639-7.
- Hendrix, Janie L.; McDermott, John (2007). Jimi Hendrix: An Illustrated Experience. Atria. ISBN 978-0-7432-9769-1.
- Larkin, Colin (1998). Virgin All-time Top 1000 Albums. Virgin. ISBN 978-0-7535-0258-7.
- Levy, Joe, ed. (2005). Rolling Stone's 500 Greatest Albums of All Time (First Paperback ed.). Wenner Books. ISBN 978-1-932958-61-4.
- McDermott, John (2009). Ultimate Hendrix: An Illustrated Encyclopedia of Live Concerts and Sessions. BackBeat Books. ISBN 978-0-87930-938-1.
- McDermott, John; Kramer, Eddie (1992). Hendrix: Setting the Record Straight. Warner Books. ISBN 978-0-446-39431-4.
- Moskowitz, David (2010). The Words and Music of Jimi Hendrix. Praeger. ISBN 978-0-313-37592-7.
- Murray, Charles Shaar (1989). Crosstown Traffic: Jimi Hendrix and the Rock 'n' Roll Revolution (First US ed.). St. Martin's Press. ISBN 978-0-312-04288-2.
- Newsweek (1996) [1967]. "The Voice of Experience". In Potash, Chris (ed.). The Jimi Hendrix Companion. Omnibus. ISBN 978-0-7119-6635-2.
- Perry, John (2004). Jimi Hendrix's Electric Ladyland. 33⅓. Bloomsbury Publishing. ISBN 1441129596.
- Roberts, David, ed. (2005). British Hit Singles & Albums (18 ed.). Guinness World Records Limited. ISBN 978-1-904994-00-8.
- Roby, Steven (2002). Black Gold: The Lost Archives of Jimi Hendrix. Billboard Books. ISBN 978-0-8230-7854-7.
- Roby, Steven; Schreiber, Brad (2010). Becoming Jimi Hendrix: From Southern Crossroads to Psychedelic London, the Untold Story of a Musical Genius. Da Capo. ISBN 978-0-306-81910-0.
- Shadwick, Keith (2003). Jimi Hendrix: Musician. Backbeat Books. ISBN 978-0-87930-764-6.
- Shapiro, Harry; Glebbeek, Caesar (1995) [1990]. Jimi Hendrix: Electric Gypsy (New and Improved ed.). St. Martin's Press. ISBN 978-0-312-13062-6.
- Stubbs, David (2003). Voodoo Child: Jimi Hendrix, the Stories Behind Every Song. Thunder's Mouth Press. ISBN 978-1-56025-537-6.
- Unterberger, Richie (2009). The Rough Guide to Jimi Hendrix. Rough Guides. ISBN 978-1-84836-002-0.
- Wenner, Jann (2010) [2004]. 500 Greatest Songs of All Time. Rolling Stone. OCLC 641731526.
- Whitaker, Matthew C. (2011). Icons of Black America: Breaking Barriers and Crossing Boundaries. Vol. 1. Greenwood. ISBN 978-0-313-37642-9.
- Whitehill, Dave (1989). Hendrix: Are You Experienced. Hal Leonard. ISBN 978-0-7119-3654-6.
