= Eric Gales =

American guitarist (born 1974)

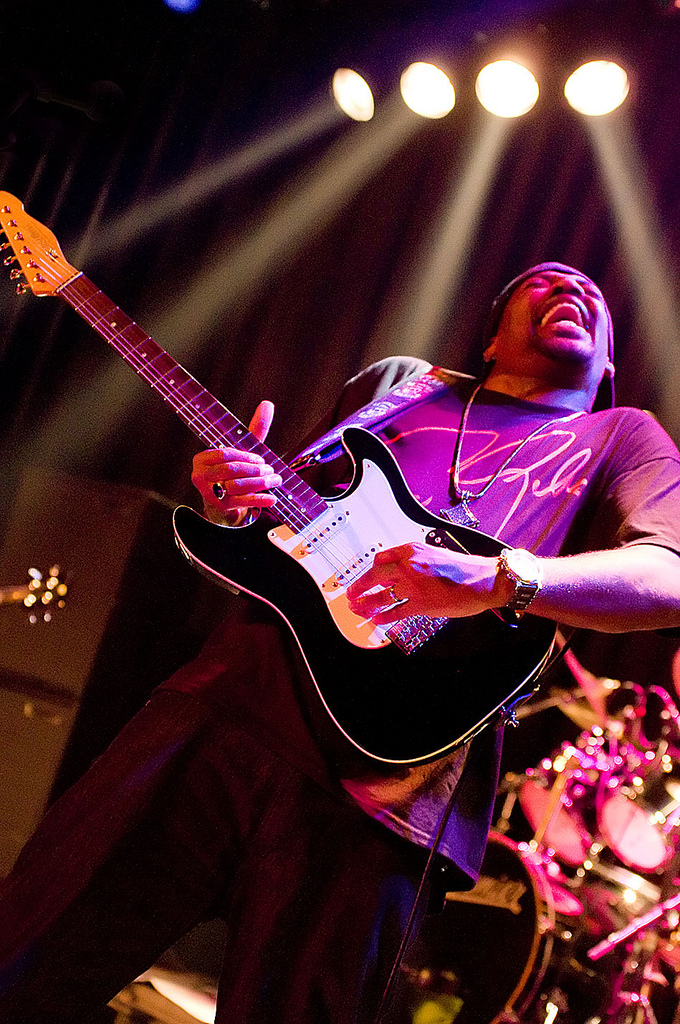
- Gales performing in 2011

Background information
- Also known as: Raw Dawg
- Born: October 29, 1974 (age 52); Memphis, Tennessee, U.S.
- Genres: Blues rock, hard rock, heavy metal
- Occupation: Musician
- Instrument: Guitar
- Years active: 1990–present
- Labels: Cleopatra Blues (a division of Cleopatra), Elektra, House of Blues, MCA, Shrapnel, Blues Bureau International, Provogue
- Spouse: LaDonna Gales
- Website: ericgalesband.com

Eric Gales (born October 29, 1974), also known as Raw Dawg, is an American blues rock guitarist, originally hailed as a child prodigy. As of 2022, Gales has recorded 19 albums for major record labels and has done session and tribute work. He has also contributed vocals on several records by the Memphis rap groups Prophet Posse and Three 6 Mafia under the names Lil E and Mack E.

== Background ==
Gales picked up the guitar at age four. His older siblings, Eugene and Manuel (Little Jimmy King), taught him songs and licks when he was young, in the style of Jimi Hendrix, Stevie Ray Vaughan, Robin Trower, Frank Marino, Albert King, and B.B. King. Gales is a huge Eric Johnson fan. In 1985, the young Gales began to play at blues competitions with his brother Eugene backing him on bass. Although Gales plays a right-handed guitar "upside-down" (with the bass E string on the bottom), he is not naturally left-handed; he was taught by his left-handed brother and never second-guessed the nontraditional technique.

Gales has released the albums Crystal Vision, The Psychedelic Underground, The Story of My Life and Layin' Down the Blues on the Blues Bureau International label, a subsidiary of Shrapnel Records. Relentless (2010) was followed by Transformation (2011) and Live (2012).

== Career ==
=== 1990s ===
In late 1990, Eric and Eugene Gales signed with Elektra Records, and together with the drummer Hubert Crawford released The Eric Gales Band (1991) and Picture of a Thousand Faces (1993). Guitar World magazine's Reader's Poll named Eric the "Best New Talent", in 1991. During this time he had two rock radio hits, "Sign of the Storm" (number 9, U.S. Mainstream Rock) and "Paralyzed" (number 31, U.S. Mainstream Rock) and had spots on television programs such as The Arsenio Hall Show.

In 1994, Gales performed with Carlos Santana at Woodstock '94. In 1995, Gales teamed up with both of his brothers to record an album, Left Hand Brand on the 'House of Blues' label (released in 1996), as the Gales Brothers. In 2001 Gales released his album That's What I Am on MCA Records.

=== 2000s - 2010s ===
In 2004, he contributed a cover of "May This Be Love" to the album Power of Soul: A Tribute to Jimi Hendrix. He also teamed up with two former Band of Gypsys members, Buddy Miles and Billy Cox to contribute to The Band of Gypsys Return album that was released in 2006. In 2008, he and other guitarists participated in the touring tribute to Jimi Hendrix, Experience Hendrix. The touring group of musicians included Billy Cox, Eric Johnson, Chris Layton, Doyle Bramhall II, Brad Whitford and Mitch Mitchell (it was the last tour that Mitchell played on).

In the winter of 2010, Gales returned to the touring circuit in Europe with TM Stevens on bass guitar and Keith LeBlanc on drums. The tour was billed as VooDoo Chile and featured works of Jimi Hendrix as well as original material from both Gales and Stevens.

In February 2013, Magna Carta Records released the album Pinnick Gales Pridgen, produced by Mike Varney and featuring Gales on guitar and vocals, Doug Pinnick on bass and vocals, and Thomas Pridgen on drums. The 13-track album featured one cover song, "Sunshine of Your Love", originally by Cream, one short instrumental based on Ludwig van Beethoven's "Für Elise", and the remaining songs written by some combination of Pinnick, Gales, Pridgen and Varney. The follow-up album, PGP2, was released in July 2014.

In 2017, Gales released his fifteenth studio effort, Middle of the Road, featuring numerous artists, including Gary Clark Jr., Lauryn Hill and others, as well as his own brother and mother. The album became his first to chart on Billboard's Top Blues Album chart, peaking at number 4, while Gales' following album, The Bookends, topped the chart at number 1. On May 9, 2019, he won the Blues Music Award for 'Blues Rock Artist of the Year'. In his acceptance speech, he said he was celebrating three years of sobriety. In May 2020, Gales won his second consecutive Blues Music Award as the 'Blues Rock Artist of the Year'.

=== 2020s ===
On October 21, 2021, Gales released the single "I Want My Crown," featuring Joe Bonamassa. The song served as the lead single from his album Crown. Produced by Bonamassa and Josh Smith, the album was released on January 28, 2022. The album highlights Gales' "struggles with substance abuse, his hopes about a new era of sobriety and unbridled creativity, and his personal reflections on racism." Upon release, it debuted at number 1 on the Billboard Blues Album chart, his second to do so. It also garnered Gales his first Grammy nomination for Best Contemporary Blues Album. It was also ranked as the number 19 best guitar album of 2022 by Guitar World readers. Gales also played on 2 tracks for the score of the 2025 Ryan Coogler film Sinners.

== Discography ==
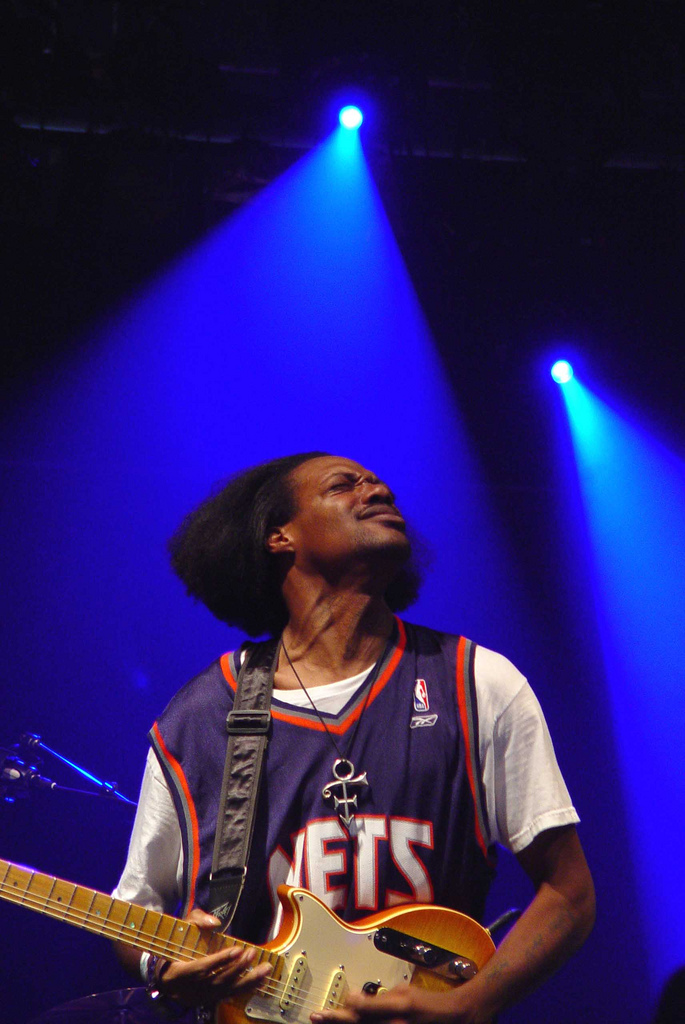
Gales in 2006

=== Solo/featured artist albums ===
- 1991: The Eric Gales Band (Elektra Records)
- 1993: Picture of a Thousand Faces (Elektra Records)
- 1996: The Gales Brothers, Left Hand Brand (House of Blues Records)
- 2001: That's What I Am (MCA Records)
- 2006: Crystal Vision (Blues Bureau International)
- 2007: The Psychedelic Underground (Blues Bureau International)
- 2008: The Story of My Life (Blues Bureau International)
- 2009: Layin' Down the Blues (Blues Bureau International)
- 2010: Relentless (Blues Bureau International)
- 2011: Transformation (Blues Bureau International)
- 2011: The Best of Eric Gales: 14 Rockin' Tunes from Blues Bureau International (P-Vine Records)
- 2012: Live (Shrapnel Records) CD/DVD
- 2013: Pinnick Gales Pridgen, Pinnick Gales Pridgen (Magna Carta Records)
- 2013: Eric Gales Trio, Ghost Notes (Tone Center Records)
- 2014: Pinnick Gales Pridgen, PGP2 (Magna Carta Records)
- 2014: Good for Sumthin (Cleopatra Records)
- 2016: A Night on the Sunset Strip (Cleopatra Records) 2-CD
- 2017: Middle of the Road (Provogue/Mascot)
- 2019: The Bookends (Provogue/Mascot)
- 2022: Crown (Provogue/Mascot)
- 2025: A Tribute To LJK (Little Jimmy King) (Artone Label Group/Provogue/Mascot)

=== Non album singles ===
- 2015: "Quest for Love" (Cleopatra Records)
- 2017: "She Cast a Spell on Me" (ft. Geno) (Cleopatra Records)
- 2023: "Sunshine Of Your Love" (w/ Doug Pinnick) (Cleopatra Records)
- 2025: "Whipping Post" (w/ Linn Holmes) (Cleopatra Records)

=== Session musician contributions, guest appearances, and various artist compilations ===
- 1993: Doro - Angels Never Die, guitar on the songs "Heaven with You", "Born to Bleed" and "Bad Blood".
- 1994: L.A. Blues Authority, Vol. V: Cream of the Crop, guitar & vocals on the song "Sleepy Time Time".
- 1994: Hard Love: 14 Original Metal Ballads, features the Eric Gales Band song "Take a Look (Deep Inside of You)".
- 1995: Memphis (Ain't Like It Used To Be), features the Eric Gales song "Black Day".
- 1998: Tela - Now or Never, guitar on the song "Caesar Knight".
- 1998: Howard Jones - People, guitar on the songs "Everything", "Sleep My Angel" and "Tomorrow Is Now".
- 1999: Project Pat: Ghetty Green, uncredited verse on the song "Up There", as Lil E (Hypnotize Minds)
- 1999: Whole Lotta Blues: Songs of Led Zeppelin, This Ain't No Tribute, acoustic guitar & vocals on the song "Custard Pie", guitar on the songs "Custard Pie (Revisited)" and "I Can't Quit You Baby", and guitar & vocals on the song "Trampled Under Foot".
- 1999: Parker Card & The Sideman Syndicate, Parker Card, with Shawn Lane (Orchard Records), guitar on the song "Rescue Me".
- 1999: Blues Power: Songs of Eric Clapton, This Ain't No Tribute, guitar & vocals on the song "Layla".
- 1999: Eightball & MJG - In Our Lifetime (Eightball & MJG album), guitar on the song "Belly" (featuring Big Duke)".
- 1999: Triple 6 Mafia: Underground Vol. 2 (Club Memphis), with "Lil E – Half on a Sack or Blow" (Prophet Entertainment)
- 1999: This Ain't No Tribute Blues Cube Box Set
- 2000: Blue Haze: Songs of Jimi Hendrix, guitar on the song "Voodoo Chile".
- 2000: Hypnotize Camp Posse: Three 6 Mafia Presents...Hypnotize Camp Posse, uncredited verse on the song "We Bout to Ride", as Lil E (Hypnotize Minds)
- 2000: Triple 6 Mafia: Underground Vol. 3 (Kings of Memphis), with "Lil E – The Powder [The Higher Version]" and "Lil E – Niggaz Down 2 Make Some Endz" (Prophet Entertainment)
- 2000: Melvin Taylor and the Slack Band - Bang That Bell, guitar on the song "Even Trolls Love Rock and Roll".
- 2001: Hellhound on My Trail: Songs of Robert Johnson, acoustic guitar & vocals on the song "Me and the Devil Blues".
- 2001: Greetings From Santa Monica, features the Eric Gales song "Down Low".
- 2001: Guitar World Spring CD Sampler, features the Eric Gales song "Handwriting On The Wall".
- 2002: Tela - Double Dose, guitar on the songs "Intro" and "Hold Up Man!".
- 2002: Southern Invasion II (The Compilation), guitar, vocals, and producer (as Raw Dawg) on the song "Ashes To Ashes".
- 2002: Led Zeppelin: This Ain't No Tribute Series - All Blues'd Up!, acoustic guitar & vocals on the song "Custard Pie", guitar on the songs "Custard Pie (Revisited)" and "I Can't Quit You Baby", and guitar & vocals on the song "Trampled Under Foot".
- 2002: Eric Clapton: This Ain't No Tribute Series - All Blues’d Up!, guitar & vocals on the song "Layla".
- 2002: A Salute to the Delta Blues Masters, acoustic guitar & vocals on the song "Me and the Devil Blues".
- 2003: Jack Ponti Presents, Vol. 1, guitar & vocals on the song "All the King's Men".
- 2003: Highway 60's / 70's Blues Revisited, guitar on the songs "Custard Pie (Revisited)" and "Layla".
- 2003: Hazy Dreams (Not Just) A Jimi Hendrix Tribute, guitar and vocals on the song "Voodoo Child (Slight Return)".
- 2003: Fernando Noronha and Black Soul - Changes, guitar.
- 2003: Stairway To Rock (Not Just) A Led Zeppelin Tribute, guitar on the song "Dazed and Confused".
- 2003: Got Blues! Today's Blues Superstars, guitar on the song "Custard Pie (Revisited)".
- 2003: Lance Lopez - Wall Of Soul, guitar on the songs "I Don't Want No More", "Quarter, Nickel or a Dime", and "Time".
- 2004: Willie Lomax Blues Review - Best Blues Money Can Buy, guitar on the song "Lighten Up".
- 2004: Power of Soul: A Tribute to Jimi Hendrix, guitar & vocals on the song "May This Be Love".
- 2005: Sir Chip - The Lottery Diamonds-N-Da-Ruff, guitar on the song "In Your Face", vocals (as E.G.B.) on "Allawishes", "What You Heard About Me", "In Your Face", and "City of the Dead".
- 2005: Ruby Wilson - Show You a Good Time, guitar on the song "One Foot In The Blues".
- 2005: Rock Revisited, acoustic guitar & vocals on the song "Custard Pie".
- 2005: Get Down Workout, guitar & vocals on the song "Trampled Under Foot".
- 2005: Blues Interlude: Just Keep Truckin' , guitar on the song "I Can't Quit You Baby".
- 2006: Wes Jeans - Forest of the Pine, guitar on the song "Somebody".
- 2006: Viva Carlos! A Supernatural Marathon Celebration, guitar on the song "Jingo".
- 2006: Tha Real Hustle & Flow Of The South, vocals (as Raw Dawg) on "Funky Town" and City of the Dead", and vocals (as E.G.B.) on "Allawishes".
- 2006: A Walk on the Blues Side, acoustic guitar & vocals on the song "Custard Pie" and guitar & vocals on the song "Trampled Under Foot".
- 2006: Billy Cox and Buddy Miles - The Band of Gypsys Return, guitar & vocals on the song “Foxey Lady”, guitar on the song "Who Knows"..
- 2007: Prophet Posse - The Return: Part 1, vocals (as Raw Dawg) on "Crush Domes", "Tootin N Da Bathroom", and "Life". Guitar on the song "Life".
- 2007: Prophet Posse - Belly of the Beast (The Return: Part 2), vocals (As Raw Dawg) on "Get High" and "Bustas Out Here Traitin'".
- 2007: Bernard Allison - Chills & Thrills, guitar on the songs “Chills & Thrills”, “When I'm Gone”, and “Just My Guitar and Me”.
- 2007: Songs of Eric Clapton All Blues'd Up: This Ain't No Tribute Series, guitar & vocals on the song "Layla".
- 2007: Songs of Led Zeppelin All Blues'd Up: This Ain't No Tribute Series, acoustic guitar & vocals on the song "Custard Pie", guitar on the songs "Custard Pie (Revisited)" and "I Can't Quit You Baby", and guitar & vocals on the song "Trampled Under Foot".
- 2009: Blues Bureau International's Burnin' Blues Shuffles, features the Eric Gales songs "Wake Up Call" and "I Got Me A Woman".
- 2009: Blues Bureau's Slow Jams, Volume One, features the Eric Gales song "Freedom From My Demons".
- 2010: Power of Soul: A Tribute to Jimi Hendrix, guitar & vocals on the song "May This Be Love".
- 2012: J Pierre - Entered My Life (ft. Eric Gales) single, guitar.
- 2014: Eli Cook - Primitive Son, guitar on the songs "The Great Southern Love Kill" and "Amphetamine Saint".
- 2014: Mark "Muleman" Massey - One Step Ahead Of The Blues, guitar.
- 2014: Midnight Rider: A Tribute to the Allman Brothers Band, guitar on the song "In Memory of Elizabeth Reed".
- 2015: Kenny Alan - Fight, guitar on the song "Fight".
- 2015: Teddy Pendergrass - Duets: Love & Soul, guitar and vocals on the song "Close The Door".
- 2015: Blues Christmas, guitar & vocals on the song "Little Drummer Boy".
- 2015: Nina Revisited... A Tribute to Nina Simone, guitar on the song "African Mailman (Instrumental)".
- 2016: Angie Stone - Covered in Soul, guitar on the song "Every 1's a Winner".
- 2016: Phil Gates - The Twelve Rhythms, guitar on the song "You Cannot".
- 2016: Supersonic Blues Machine - West Of Flushing, South of Frisco, guitar on the song "Nightmares And Dreams".
- 2016: The Apocalypse Blues Revue - The Apocalypse Blues Revue, guitar on the song "The Tower".
- 2017: Bootsy Collins - World Wide Funk’ guitar on the song "Come Back Bootsy".
- 2017: Memphis Moe - Real Dreams, guitar on the songs "Intro" and "Outro".
- 2017: Walter Trout - We're All In This Together, guitar on the song "Somebody Going Down".
- 2017: Ken Valdez - Soul Renegade, guitar on the song "Sometimes".
- 2017: Playa G - Reign, guitar on the song "Go Hard".
- 2017: Supersonic Blues Machine - Californisoul, guitar on the song "Elevate".
- 2017: Paul Lamb and The Detroit Breakdown - Fly In 4mation, guitar on the song "Fear Free".
- 2017: Modern R&B: The Soul Sessions, guitar & vocals on the songs "Quest for Love".
- 2018: Sebastian Lane - Walkin' by Myself, guitar on the song "Jezebel".
- 2018: Darryl Anders Agapésoul – Conversations, guitar on the song "Fruitvale Gumbo".
- 2019: Matty T. Wall - Transpacific Blues, Vol. 1, guitar on the song "Hi Heel Sneakers".
- 2019: Ally Venable - Texas Honey, guitar on the song "Come and Take It".
- 2019: Gary Hoey - Neon Highway Blues, guitar on the song "Under The Rug".
- 2019: Jellybean Johnson - Let Me Shine On’ guitar on the song "Let Me Shine On".
- 2019: Bobby Sparks II - Schizophrenia: The Yang Project, guitar on the song "So Fine".
- 2019: Mike Zito and Friends - Rock'n'Roll: A Tribute to Chuck Berry, guitar on the song "Back In The USA".
- 2020: Joe Louis Walker - Blues Comin On, guitar on the song "Blues Comin' On".
- 2020: Aaron Haggerty - Ctrl+snr+del, guitar on the song "The Homie".
- 2020: Junior Wells - Blues Brothers, guitar on the song "Lovey Dovey Lovey One".
- 2020: Marvelous Funkshun - Trouble single, guitar.
- 2020: Travis Tidwell - Catch Me If You Can, guitar on the song "Steady Peace".
- 2021: Eric Bibb - Dear America, guitar on the song "Whole World's Got The Blues".
- 2021: Marvelous Funkshun - I Love You, guitar on the songs "Trouble", "Maggot Brain", and "Funky B*tch"
- 2021: Jason Damico- Reveal Me, guitar on the song "Reveal Me".
- 2021: Playing It Forward To Help Benefit Musicares Foundation, guitar on the song "Only Love".
- 2022: Cory Henry, The Funk Apostles - Operation Funk (Live), guitar on the song "Rise".
- 2022: A Tribute to Eric Clapton, guitar & vocals on the song “Sunshine Of Your Love”.
- 2022: Supersonic Blues Machine - Voodoo Nation, guitar on the song "Devil At The Doorstep".
- 2022: St. Paul Peterson - Break on Free single, guitar
- 2022: Jason Damico - Delusional single, guitar.
- 2022: Mike Zito - Blues for the Southside (Live), guitar on the song "Voodoo Chile".
- 2022: Narada Michael Walden, Tony "TC" Coleman, featuring Tony Lindsay and Eric Gales - A World Without War single, guitar.
- 2022: Bobby Sparks II - Paranoia, guitar on the song "Lift Every Voice And Sing".
- 2023: The Bar-Kays - Tennessee Whiskey single, guitar.
- 2023: Mött - Drift Away single, guitar.
- 2023: Misty Blues - Outside the Lines, guitar on the song "Long Time Coming".
- 2023: Monkey Diet - Ant Death Spiral, guitar on the song "Sleeping Sand, Silent Cloud".
- 2023: Emanuel Casablanca - Blood on My Hands, guitar on the song "Blood on My Hands".
- 2023: Sean Ardoin and Kreole Rock And Soul - Mosaic, guitar on the song "Bad Habits".
- 2024: Angelique Francis - Train Coming, guitar on the song "Train Coming".
- 2024: Beth Hart - You Still Got Me, guitar on the song "Suga N' My Bowl".
- 2024: Cory Henry - Church, guitar on the song "Burdens Down".
- 2024: Jubu Smith - Jubu, guitar on the song "EG is Here".
- 2024: Ghost-Note - Mustard N' Onions, guitar on the song "Grandma's Curtains".
- 2024: Marvelous Funkshun - Harris the Hater, guitar on the song "Harris the Hater".
- 2024: Eric Clapton's Crossroads Guitar Festival 2023 (Live), guitar & vocals on the songs "Layla", "Put That Back", "Going Down", and "Medley: Für Elise/Foxy Lady", guitar on the songs "Give Your Love to Someone Else", "Smokestack Lightning" and "I Put a Spell on You".
- 2024: Nukannguaq - Pigasuartaatit EP, guitar on the song "Taassumalu".
- 2024: Pyletribe - Egyptian Princess, guitar on the song "Egyptian Princess".
- 2024: The Chess Project - New Moves, guitar on the songs "Tell Me" and "Help Me".
- 2025: Popa Chubby - I Love Freddie King, guitar on the song "My Credit Didn't Go Through".
- 2025: In Theory - Retribution, guitar on the song "Since I Been Loving You". Song also released as a single.
- 2025: Angelique Francis - Not Defeated, guitar on the song "Train Coming".
- 2025: Sinners Original Motion Picture Score, guitar on the tracks "Grand Closin'" and "Elijah".
- 2025: Joe Bonamassa - B.B. King's Blues Summit 100, Vol. III - guitar on the song "Heartbreaker".
- 2025: Dust & Blood - Better Angels of Our Nature - guitar on the song "Emma Enchanted".
- 2026: Cactus, Carmine Appice - Temple of Blues II - All-Stars - guitar on the song "Back Door Man Pt. 1".
- 2026: RED Hands - Kinfolk, guitar on the whole album. The song "Happy Feelin's" was released as a single.
- 2026: Faye Carol Faye Sings The Blues, guitar on the song "Black Nights".
- 2026: B.B. King - Lucille Talks Back (50th Anniversary), guitar on the song "When I'm Wrong". Song also released as a single.
- 2026: Ride The Rainbow The Ultimate Tribute to Ritchie Blackmore's Rainbow, guitar on the song "I Surrender". Song was also released as a single.
- 2026: Bootsy Collins, Buckethead - Metal Health, guitar on the song "Manic Depression". Song also released as a single.
- 2026: Faye Carol - Faye Sings The Blues, guitar on the song "Black Nights".
- 2026: Engelbert Humperdinck - Faithfully, guitar on the song "More Than Words".
