= August Blues Festival =

Music festival held in Haapsalu, Estonia

- Genre: Blues
- Locations: Haapsalu, Estonia
- Years active: 1993-present
- Website: augustibluus.ee

August Blues Festival (Estonian: Augustibluus) is a blues music festival held in Haapsalu, Estonia since 1994.

The festival takes place mainly inside the walls of Haapsalu Castle. It is the biggest blues festival in the Baltic states.

Besides Estonian blues musicians, there have been guests from United States and elsewhere. Andy Fairweather Low, Nik West, Candye Kane, Earl Thomas, Omar Kent Dykes, Gene Taylor, Lucky Peterson, Lance Lopez, Coco Montoya, Kirk Fletcher, Jimmy Zavala, Eric Gales, Artur Menezes, and Duke Robillard have all performed at the festival.

== See also ==
- List of blues festivals
- List of folk festivals
