= Joy (Band AKA song) =

1983 single by Band AKA

Single by Band AKA

from the album Men of the Music
- B-side: "Joy" (instrumental)
- Released: 1983
- Length: 3:43 (7″ version); 6:28 (12″ version)
- Label: Epic; Streetwave
- Songwriter: J. James Jarrett
- Producer: J. James Jarrett

Band AKA singles chronology
"If You Want to Know" (1983)	"Joy" (1983)	"Work Me All Over" (1983)

"Joy" is a song by the American group Band AKA, released in 1983 as a single from their second studio album, Men of the Music. It was a hit in the UK, registering on multiple charts that year.

== Background ==
"Joy" was written, arranged and produced by J. James Jarrett. It was published by PPL Records. The US version was released on Bouvier Records (B0-0101-5), a subsidiary of PPL Records. The 7" version was released in the UK on Epic and Streetwave (both EPC A3145). The 12" version released in the UK was on Epic and Streetwave (EPC A13 3145).

It was reported in the 19 March issue of Record Mirror that with "Joy" in the charts, Band AKA were coming to Britain for their first ever tour in the next month. With multiple appearances, their first mentioned appearances were at the London Venue on the 14th and 15th of April.

== Reception ==
James Hamilton reported in his "Odds 'N' Bodds" page in the 12 February 1983 issue of Record Mirror that the Streetwave release was the same as the vocal version already available, with the instrumental version on the flip side seguing into "Grace", and remarked that it was a wasted opportunity.

In his "Odds 'N' Bodds" page for the week of 5 March, Hamilton was giving his views on the release on Epic (EPC A13-3145). He stated that the "114bpm 12in soul swayer" was catchy enough, but took a while before reaching the band's strong point. He complimented the saxophone, but opined that the seque into "Grace" was "clumsy" and "truly awful", and that "a simple edit from sax to sax" would have been better. He also remarked that Morgan Khan of Streetwave couldn't care about the release as the label was leaving CBS / Epic at the time.

According to Hamilton, Lofty Lofthouse in Gateshead was one of the many critics saying that the "tragic" mixing point between "Joy" and "Grace" emptied the floor.

== Charts ==
=== Record Mirror Disco ===
For the week of 29 January, "Joy" debuted at No. 26 in the Record Mirror Disco chart. For the week of 26 March, the record peaked at No. 2.

=== Record Mirror Top 12" Singles ===
For the week of 5 March, "Joy" debuted at No. 19 in the Record Mirror Top 12" Singles chart. For the week of 19 March, it peaked at No. 5.

=== Record Mirror Top 100 Singles ===
"Joy" debuted at No. 59 in the Record Mirror Top Singles chart for the week of 5 March. It peaked at No. 24 for the week of 19 March, which is where it peaked Nationally.

=== Music Week Disco ===
"Joy" reached number one on the Music Week Disco chart.

== Companies ==
- Licensed to CBS Records
- Produced for Princess Productions Ltd.
- Phonographic Copyright – PPL Records
- Recorded by PPL Records
- Published by Copyright Control
