= Carrie McDowell =

- Also known as: Carrie Hodge
- Born: 1965 (age 60–61); Des Moines, IA, United States
- Occupation: Singer
- Labels: Motown, Star Song
- Formerly of: Two Hearts
- Spouse: Michael Hodge

Carrie McDowell is a singer who began at a young age. During the 1980s, she had hits with "Uh, Uh, No No Casual Sex" and " When a Woman Loves a Man".

== Background ==
Carrie McDowell was born in 1965 in Des Moines, IA. She started performing at the age of nine.

While still in her teens, she was on the road with Tommy Spanos. At the age of twelve, she had also been on the Johnny Carson Show several times. Artists she opened for included, Rowan & Martin, George Burns and Danny Thomas.

She would end up being a Motown protege of Berry Gordy and Smokey Robinson. Her single "Uh, Uh, No No Casual Sex" was described as monogamy funk, a promotion of safe sex.

== Career ==
=== 1970s–1980s ===
McDowell's debut album was released in 1987. An article about Mitch McDowell of General Kane and her appeared in the 14 August 1987 issue of the Santa Cruz Sentinel. Besides informing the reader that she was no relation to Motown label mate Mitch McDowell, the debut album was said to present the width of her talent, with a whole side of funk and rock being offered, as well as ballads.

==== "Uh, Uh, No Casual Sex" ====
She recorded the single, "Uh, Uh, No Casual Sex" which was co-written by Willie Hutch. It was released as a single in 1987. The remix version of the song debuted at No. 47 in the Club Play section of the Billboard Hot Dance / Disco chart for the week of 20 June.

She was pictured in the 3 July 1987 issue of Black Radio Exclusive, talking to Dance Floor Hits host Marteen Macareno. She told Macareno that the song was a sign of the times and if you mess around you could die. The song had a strong statement, and she was glad that she was making it. The song also made the Black Radio Exclusive chart.

It was released in the UK on 14 September. Supplied to European holiday resort discos where British people frequented, it generated what was described as a healthy amount of demand. It was described by James Hamilton as a catchily skittering message to stay celibate.

For the week of 26 September, McDowell's single, "Uh, Uh, No Casual Sex" debuted at No. 68 in the Music Week Top 75 Singles chart, and 68 on the Top of the Pops chart. It peaked at No. 68. The song also was a hit on the Music Week Top Dance Singles chart. At week two, it peaked at No. 21 for the week of 3 October. It was still charting for the week of 17 October.

==== Further activities ====
McDowell recorded another song that was written by Hal Davis and Willie Hutch. The single, "When a Woman Loves a Man" was reviewed in the 17 October 1987 issue of Cash Box. The reviewer called it a gorgeous ballad and said that it should establish her with the older demographics, while retaining her popularity with the younger audience. It peaked at No. 45 on the Adult Contemporary chart.

=== 1990s ===
In 1992, McDowell and her husband Michael Hodge released the Christian-themed album, Stand Your Ground. It featured a cover of Randy Stonehill's "Shut De Do".

As one half of the duo, Two Hearts that included her husband Michael Hodge, they had six hits on the Christian music charts from 1992–1994.
