= Crack Killed Applejack =

Single by General Kane

from the album In Full Chill
- B-side: "Applejack's Theme"
- Released: 1986
- Length: 4:20
- Label: Gordy
- Songwriter: M. McDowell
- Producers: Mitch McDowell; Curtis Anthony Nolen; Steve Buckley (exec.)

General Kane singles chronology
"Crack Killed Applejack" (1986)	"Hairdooz" (1986)

"Crack Killed Applejack" is a 1986 single for the group General Kane. It has a strong anti-drug message and was banned from airplay in some places.

== Background ==
"Crack Killed Applejack" is a song with a strong anti-drug message. The writer of the song Mitch McDowell wanted to paint horrible picture of crack so that anyone who hadn't yet tried it would think twice. The song tells the story of a young man who had a lot of promise and was voted no. 1 in the school. However, his life is destroyed by the drug and in the end, he succumbs to prostitution.

It was written by Mitch McDowell who co-produced it with Curtis Anthony Nolen. It was released on Gordy 1865GF.

== Reception ==
A Recommended record in the 30 August 1986 issue of Billboard, the reviewer said that it was more cinematic and colorful than the average real-life tragedy.

In the Out of the Box column of Billboard, 6 September, the single had been added to the playlist of XHRM in San Diego. It was described as one of the more controversial records added to the list. Program director Lee McCollum said "People are listening to the message of the lyrics, and the song is good as well".

According to the 4 October 1986 issue of The Los Angeles Times, the song is done in the rap style such as Grandmaster Flash’s "White Lines", an anti-drug statement song.

In his Rhythm & The Blues column (Billboard 20 September), Nelson George called it a hard -edged anti-crack rap with lyrics that recalled "Papa Was a Rolling Stone" and that it had a bass line as vital as the one on Cameo's "Single Life". He said that Motown producer Curtis Anthony Nolen and mixer Norman Whitfield Jr had given the track a tough ominous feeling. He said that there was a chance of it becoming a hit and making an impact. There was hope that it would attract the audience that needed the message.

According to the 27 September issue of Billboard, Bernie Miller, the program director of WLUM in Milwaukee said that "Crack Killed Applejack" was an instant phoner and was as strong and timely as the message is here. He also said that the dance factor was very high.

== Airplay ==
For the week of 20 September, with the song on the play list of forty radio stations, it was also a new addition on twenty-four stations.

For the week of 18 October, the single had debuted at No. 27 on the play chart at KITS in San Francisco.

As per the 25 October issue of Billboard, Terri Avery of KKDA-FM in Dallas said that "Crack Killed Applejack" was taking a strong hold in Dallas after three weeks of play. He was really glad about it and had joined many programmers in their support of the song's message.

== Charts ==
=== 7" version ===
For the week of 20 September, "Crack Killed Applejack" was at no. 70 on the Billboard Black Singles chart.

The single debuted at No. 40 in Airplay section of the Billboard Hot Black Singles & Airplay chart for the week of 27 September. For the week of 8 November, the single reached its peak position of No. 12 in both the Billboard Hot Black Singles Sales and Airplay charts.

=== 12" version ===
For the week of 25 October, the 12" version was at No. 4 on the Break Outs section of the Billboard 12-Inch Singles Sales chart. It debuted at no. 47 on the 12-Inch Singles Sales chart for the week of 1 November.

== Other versions ==
Stevie Salas recorded a version of the song which appeared on his 1995 Back from the Living album.
