= Picture of a Thousand Faces =

Studio album by the Eric Gales Band
- Released: 1993
- Studios: Ardent, Kiva
- Genre: Blues rock
- Length: 54:06
- Label: Elektra
- Producers: Jim Gaines; Terry Thomas

The Eric Gales Band chronology
The Eric Gales Band (1991)	Picture of a Thousand Faces (1993)

Picture of a Thousand Faces is the second album by the American band the Eric Gales Band, released in 1993. Gales was 18 when the album came out. The first single was "Paralyzed", which peaked at No. 31 on Billboard's Mainstream Rock chart. The band supported the album with a North American tour.

== Production ==
The album was recorded at Ardent Studios and Kiva Studios, in Memphis. It was produced primarily by Jim Gaines, who developed appendicitis during the recording sessions. The band's label, Elektra, hired Terry Thomas to help Gales achieve a poppier sound on some of the tracks. Eric's brother, Eugene, moved from bass to guitar, so that the band could have a fuller sound. Some songs were influenced by the Gales brothers' Christian faith, although Eugene did not consider the music to be Christian rock. "Angel of the Night" is a ballad. "I Want You (She's So Heavy)" is a cover of the Beatles song. "Take a Look (Deep Inside of You)" reflects on the 1992 Los Angeles riots.

== Critical reception ==
Professional ratings
Review scores
Source	Rating
The Indianapolis Star	2.5/4 stars
Philadelphia Daily News	3/4 stars
Pittsburgh Post-Gazette	4/4 stars
Tampa Bay Times	2/4 stars

The Philadelphia Daily News noted that "since Jimi's sad demise, there's been a horde of guys trying to kiss the Hendrix flame and make a blazing soul-rock connection... Eric Gales, represented here with his bristling second album, is one of the cockier challengers". The Las Vegas Review-Journal said that Gales, with Picture of a Thousand Faces, is "a rare example of a new artist with a sound that rocks hard enough for 'mainstream' radio formats, but with a sophistication more common to the alternative or 'adult eclectic' side of the dial." The Tampa Bay Times concluded that, "with his blazing blues-rock excursions a given, the only big obstacle for Gales is finding material".

The Los Angeles Times opined that "while the new second album ... is an improvement over the debut collection, neither one features any grabbers." The Hamilton Spectator concluded that "the right combination of rock and soul, killer tunes ... and wailing solos make Picture of a Thousand Faces one of the guitar rock albums of the year." The Indianapolis Star stated that "the band's distinctive sound—punctuated with smooth lead vocals from Gales and his brother Eugene layered over frenzied guitar work—is easily discernible from the mishmash of a lot of rock on the radio". The Pittsburgh Post-Gazette concluded: "Not content to ape archaic gutbucket blues like many white-bread contemporaries, heavy blues rock, in Gales' hands, hasn't sounded this good since the unfortunate demise of Badlands. Ten years ago, they would've called this a metal album."

== Track listing ==
No.	Title	Length
1.	"Paralyzed"	4:35
2.	"Angel of the Night"	4:36
3.	"Picture of a Thousand Faces"	4:57
4.	"God Only Knows"	5:40
5.	"I Want You (She's So Heavy)"	7:41
6.	"Temple of Deliverance"	5:12
7.	"Guilty of the Innocence"	5:14
8.	"Misty"	0:42
9.	"Take a Look (Deep Inside of You)"	4:52
10.	"Bang That Bell"	4:06
11.	"Draw the Line"	6:31
Total length:		54:06
