= The Band of Gypsys Return =

Studio album by Billy Cox & Buddy Miles
- Released: 02 May 2006
- Label: Image Entertainment EXP3432, Experience Hendrix EXP3432

The Band of Gypsys Return is a 2006 album by Billy Cox and Buddy Miles. The album features new studio and live recordings from the Band of Gyspys period during the career of Jimi Hendrix, when Cox and Miles were members of that band.

== Background ==
The album is a compact disc and DVD combination. It contains nine tracks on the compact disc, and there are four selections on the DVD. In 2004, Buddy Miles and Billy Cox went back to the Band of Gypsy's material for a live album. Two years later it was released. Including the Hendrix classics such as "Foxy Lady", "Stone Free" and "Machine Gun", there are two compositions by Billy Cox. The guest musicians include Eric Gales, Kid Rock sideman Kenny Olson, and Andy Aledort of Guitar World.

== Reception ==
According to Blabbermouth, the DVD highlights are footage of the song "Power of Soul" being recorded in the studio and "Foxey Lady" and "Who Knows" being played live, and interviews of Buddy Miles and Billy Cox.

The album was given three-and-a-half stars by Ted Drozdowski of the Boston Phoenix in July 2006. One song singled out was "Let Your Word Be Your Bond" which was written by Billy Cox. Drozdowski called it a "straight shot of contemporary Southern soul in the Z.Z. Hill, Denise LaSalle mode". He also praised Eric Gales' playing on "Who Knows" and "Foxy Lady".

The album was reviewed in the August 2006 issue of Guitar World. The two songs singled out and referred to as standout moments were "Power of Soul" and "Machine Gun". It was given three-and-a-half stars by AllMusic. The album was rated 16/20 by Spirit of Rock.

== Track listings ==
=== CD ===
1. "Power of Soul"
2. "Machine Gun"
3. "Manic Depression"
4. "You've Got the Best in Town"
5. "Let Your Word Be Your Bond"
6. "Stone Free"
7. Power of Soul
8. "Who Knows"
9. "Foxey Lady"

=== DVD ===
1. Rehearsals
2. "Foxey Lady"
3. Clinton Recording Studios
4. Interviews

== Musicians ==
- Andy Aledort – guitar, backing vocals
- Joe Bashorun – keyboards
- Henri Brown – bass
- Billy Cox – bass, backing vocals
- Matt Frenette – drums
- Eric Gales, guitar, rhythm guitar, backing vocals
- Rick Hendrix – guitar
- Buddy Miles – drums, vocals
- James Nixon – guitar, backing vocals
- Kenny Olson – guitar
- Sheldon Reynolds – guitar, vocals, backing vocals
- Gary Serkin – guitar
- Jerry Stockard – drums
- Shannon Wilford – harmonica
