= Josh Smith (musician) =

American blues guitarist (born 1979)

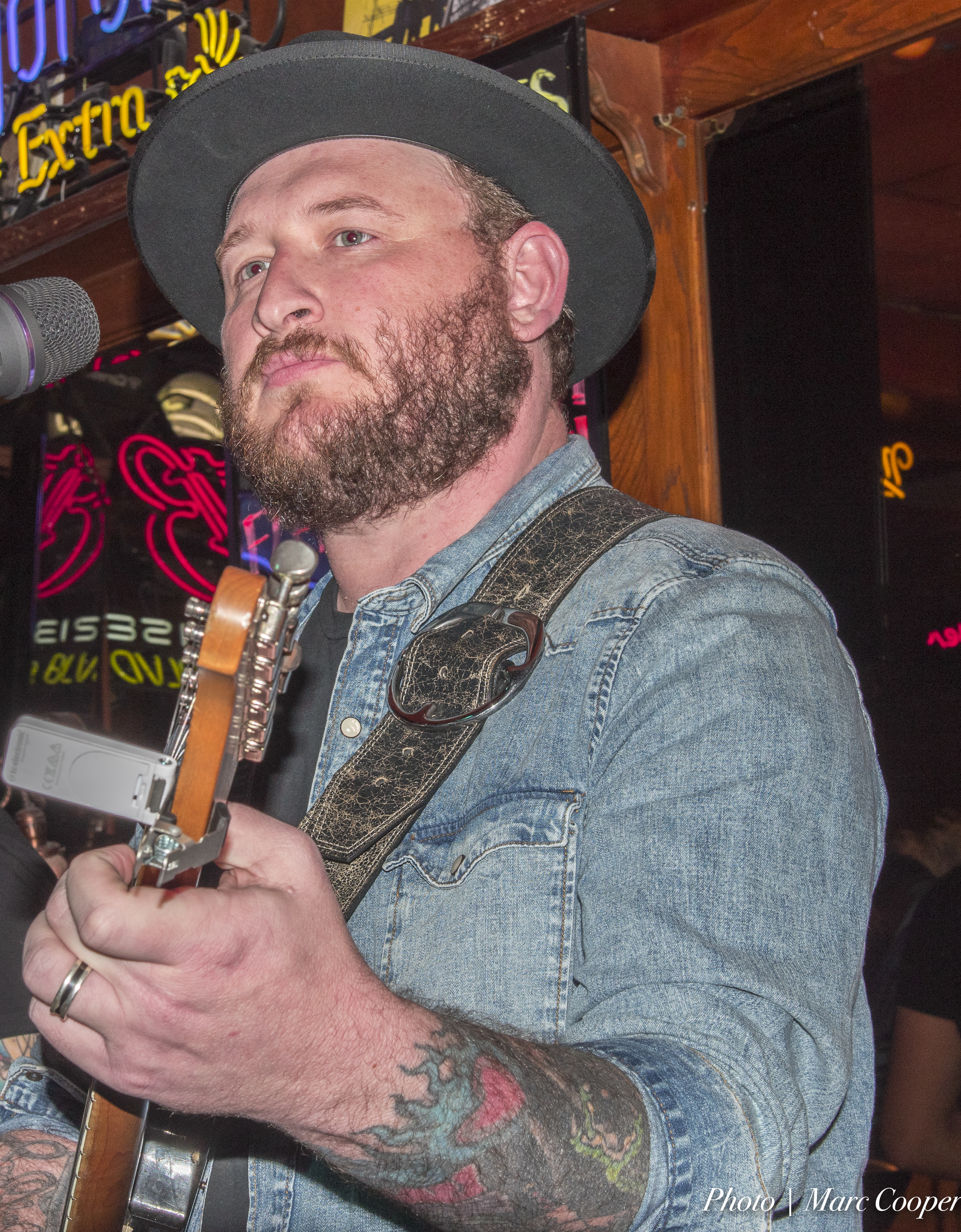
Josh Smith in 2015

Josh Smith (born October 7, 1979) is an American blues guitar player from Fort Lauderdale, Florida. He now lives in Los Angeles and is a record producer at his studio Flat V Studios. In 2019 Guitar World magazine put Smith number 16 on their list, "The 30 best blues guitarists in the world today".

== Early life ==
Smith was born in 1979 in Middletown, Connecticut, and raised in Fort Lauderdale, Florida. He began playing guitar when he was seven years old, and at 10 years old he began playing at blues festivals. He also began making albums when he was fourteen. By the time he was 18 he had released three albums. When he was 22 he got married and moved to Los Angeles.

== Career ==
When Smith was 16 he toured the United States with his band, Rhino Cats. The band released two independent albums, Born Under a Blue Sign and Woodsheddin'. After the Rhino Cats Smith formed another band (a trio) which he called, Josh Smith and the Frost. He was 18 years old at the time and they released an album, Too Damn Cold. It was produced by Jim Gaines. Throughout his career he has played guitar on the albums of Taylor Hicks, Ricky Fanté, and Raphael Saadiq.

Smith is also a record producer and he owns Flat V Studios in Los Angeles, California. He has produced albums for Artur Menezes, Reese Wynans, Eric Gales, Joanna Connor, Joanne Shaw Taylor, Marc Broussard, Larry McCray, Andy Timmons, and Joe Bonamassa among others.

Guitar World magazine put Smith at number 16 on their list, "The 30 best blues guitarists in the world today". Rock and Blues Muse put Smith on their list of the "Top 15 Contemporary Blues Rock Guitarists 2020".

== Discography ==
- Josh Smith & And The Rhino Cats – Woodsheddin', 1995
- Josh Smith & The Frost – Too Damn Cold, 1997
- Josh Smith – Deep Roots, 2006
- Josh Smith – Inception, 2009
- Josh Smith – I'm Gonna Be Ready, 2011
- Josh Smith – Don't Give Up On Me, 2012
- Josh Smith – Over Your Head, 2015
- Josh Smith – Still, 2017
- Josh Smith – Burn to Grow, 2018
- Josh Smith – Live at the Spud, 2019 (Live at the Baked Potatoe, Los Angeles, 2018)
- Josh Smith – Bird of Passage, 2022
