= Little Jimmy King =

American blues guitarist, singer and songwriter (1964–2002)

- Born: Emmanuel Lynn Gales; December 4, 1964; Memphis, Tennessee, United States
- Died: July 19, 2002 (aged 37) Memphis, Tennessee, United States
- Genres: Memphis blues, electric blues, soul blues
- Occupations: Guitarist, singer, songwriter
- Instruments: Guitar, vocals
- Years active: 1980s–2002
- Labels: Bullseye Blues, King James
- Website: https://www.facebook.com/LittleJimmyKing

Emmanuel Lynn Gales (December 4, 1964 – July 19, 2002), known professionally as Little Jimmy King, was an American Memphis blues guitarist, singer and songwriter. A left-handed guitarist who played the instrument upside down, he concocted his stage name in deference to his two musical heroes, Jimi Hendrix and Albert King.

He is best known for his tracks "Win, Lose or Draw" and "Upside Down and Backwards". He was the frontman of Little Jimmy King & the Memphis Soul Survivors. He also worked with Albert King and with his brothers Eric and Eugene Gales.

== Biography ==
Gales was born in Memphis, Tennessee. At the age of six, and along with his twin brother Daniel, Jimmy received an acoustic guitar. Naturally left-handed, he learned to play with the guitar upside down. Around age ten, he and Daniel instructed their younger brother Eric Gales, who also learned to play upside down and left handed, despite being right handed. In his early teens, Jimmy graduated to an electric model. He started his musical career playing rock and roll, but in the 1980s he switched to playing the blues. Nevertheless, as was later noted, King often merged both genres in his playing. He joined Albert King's backing band in 1988, and the twosome formed such a friendship that Albert referred to Little Jimmy as his "adopted" grandson. At the end of this period, the latter formally changed his name to King.

After leaving Albert King's band, Little Jimmy King formed his own ensemble, called Little Jimmy King & the Memphis Soul Survivors, and released his debut album in 1991 on the Bullseye Blues label. The Allmusic journalist Thom Owens described the disc as "an exciting, promising debut". In 1993, King had a small cameo role in the film The Firm, playing a street musician on Beale Street, in Memphis.

King's next album was Something Inside of Me (1994). It was produced by Ron Levy. On the recording King used various musicians, billed as the King James Version Band, and also used Tommy Shannon (bass guitar) and Chris Layton (drums), who were formerly part of Stevie Ray Vaughan's backing ensemble, Double Trouble. One music journalist noted that the album was "caught between traditional blues and its rock equivalent" and that King was an "uneasy amalgam of both disparate elements, which he struggled to mould into a recognizably individual sound". In 1995, King recorded with his brothers, Eric and Eugene Gales. The resultant album, Left Hand Brand, released on the House of Blues label, was billed as by the Gales Brothers. In addition, King played guitar on Ann Peebles's 1992 album, Full Time Love. He also backed Otis Clay on his albums I'll Treat You Right and On My Way Home.

In 1997, Willie Mitchell produced King's third Bullseye Blues release, Soldier for the Blues. Cub Koda noted that the collection had a "more pronounced soul blues feeling than his two previous efforts". In September 2000, at Bobby Bland's receiving of the Blues Ball Pyramid Award, King played at the benefit tribute event.

In 2002, the year of his death, Bullseye released Live at Monterey, featuring live tracks from 1999 and some studio tracks from 1994.

King died on July 19, 2002, in Memphis, after suffering a heart attack.

== Discography ==
Year	Title	Record label
1991	Little Jimmy King & the Memphis Soul Survivors	Bullseye Blues
1994	Something Inside of Me	Bullseye Blues
1997	Soldier for the Blues	Bullseye Blues
2002	Live at Monterey	Bullseye Blues & Jazz
2008	Live at B.B. King's, LA	King James Records

with Ann Peebles

Year	Title	Record label
1992	Full Time Love	Bullseye Blues

with Otis Clay

Year	Title	Record label
1992	I'll Treat You Right	Bullseye Blues
1993	On My Way Home	Bullseye Blues

with The Gales Brothers

Year	Title	Record label
1996	Left Hand Brand	House of Blues

== See also ==
- List of Memphis blues musicians
- List of electric blues musicians
- List of soul-blues musicians
