= PPL Records =

- Founded: c. 1979
- Founder: J. James Jarrett
- Distributor: MCA Records
- Genre: Various
- Country of origin: United States
- Location: 486 N. Camden Dr. Suite 200, Beverly Hills, CA 90210

PPL Records is a Los Angeles-based record company. Some of the artists who have had recordings released on the label include, Geno Austin, the Band AKA, Stacye Branche, Michael Cruz, Garry Glenn, Riki Hendrix, and The Olympics.

== Background ==
The organization was formed by J. James Jarrett, and opened its offices in Hollywood in 1979. As of December 1979, the company was structured with J. James Jarrett as president, Dave Dyer as senior vice-president and Re Kelly as vice president.

PPL Records is the umbrella organization Bouvier Records. Another label connected to PPL was Credence Records. Michel Cruz was the VP and A&R man for the label.

The label would eventually use MCA Records as their distributor.

== History ==
=== 1970s–1980s ===
It was stated in the 15 December 1979 issue of Record World that the first releases for the fledgling record label were albums by Arthur King and Garry Glenn.

It was reported in the 24 May 1980 issue of Billboard that Michael Cruz who had been with the Chicago-based entertainment and recording firm, Studio Media had come on board to PPL Records' as its creative affairs vice president.

By October 1980, Denise Gauthier who was in sales and purchasing for a local pharmaceutical firm had taken on the role of national sales director.

Automation was a group made up of Michael Terry, Alfonzo Jones and Ronnie Hasley. They had signed up to PPL in late 1980. According to the 29 November issue of Billboard, their single was due for release in mid-December.

As written in the 9 May 1981 issue of Cash Box, there were some changes at PPL Records. Denise Gauthier, who had been with the company for 1½ years had been moved up from the position of national sales director to vice president of sales. Michael Cruz who had been the VP of creative services was promoted to the position of executive V.P./A&R, for the Credence Records label. He was to also record for that label. Emiko Ray who was previously an administration assistant was promoted to production assistant to the president of PPL Records. By that time, PPL Records had opened their new studio called, the R.E.D. Funkin' Rockin Cabin.

It was reported in the 1 August 1981 issue of Billboard, that PPL Records Corp. had sold the majority of its stock to the Nevada company, T. J. Mule Development. In spite of this, many of the executive staff were to remain in the company. J. James Jarrett, formerly in the position of president was now executive vice-president and general manager. Other staff to remain were, Re Kelly, the administration vice president, Ricardo Starks the national sales vice president, Denise Gauthier, the sales vice president, and studio operations man, Peter Dyer.

Also in 1981, Jae Jarrett, who was working with engineers, Tom Herzer and Carl Lange at Golden Age Recorders in Culver City, California, was producing Stacye Branche's debut album.

By the first quarter of 1982, PPL Records had entered into a two-year agreement with MCA Records for the pressing and distribution of their product. The forecast at the time was for, between six and eight albums to be released that year. The first was a record by Band AKA, which was produced by J. James Jarrett. There were expectations of later releases of material by Michael Cruz, Stacy Branche, Clement Forest, as well as and other projects by Michael Cruz and the AKA Band. At the time, other executives in the organization were, Re Kelly, executive vice president; Rick Starks, vice president of marketing and promotion and Denise Gautheir, vice president sales.

In May 1982, the Band AKA had their PPL recording of "Grace" released via Epic Records. The single made headway in the UK. It was at no. 1 in the UK on the Record Business, Disco Twelve Inchers chart. Their album, AKA on PPL records was at No. 13 for the second week. The 7" record peaked at No. 41 on the UK main chart.

Stacye Branché's Flash album was released on the Bouvier Records label in 1983. It was produced by James Jarrett. Nearly forty years later, it would make the Goldmine "Ten '80s R&B albums worthy of rebirth into the vinyl revival" list. The author, TONE Scott was hoping that one day it would get a rebirth at the pressing plants.

=== 1990s–present ===
By late 1995, PPL Records had a new executive appointment. Juana Beguemin was now the vice chairman/CFO at PPL/MCI Entertainment Group in Los Angeles. Three new A&R positions consisted of Kenneth G. Allen as director of blues A&R, Roujae "Rooster" Brown as VP of country A&R, and Michael Kunta Oguasulire as director of A&R. Douglas Simms also joined the company as the mid-American Director of Promotions and Talent Acquisition.

Riki Hendrix, along with two former Band of Gypsys members, recorded his album Rainbow Gypsy Child at Metrosound Studios. It was mastered by Jaeson Jarrett and Studios (Granada Hills) with engineer Tom Thomas. It was released in 2004 on PPL P-CDA-0604-3.

Also in 2004, Juz Cuz, a six-piece band were working with producer, Jaeson Jarrett and engineer Tom Thomas, recording their debut album at Metrosound Studios. The group who had signed to PPL in fall were expecting their album, The Return of the Players, to be released on 22 June.
