= Riki Hendrix =

American rock guitarist (??–2026)

- Also known as: Rick Hendrix, Ricky Hendrix
- Born: Ricky Goodloe; San Bernardino, California, United States
- Genres: Funk, Rock
- Occupation: Musician
- Instrument: Guitar
- Years active: 1970s - 2026
- Label: PPL Records
- Formerly of: Booty People, General Caine, The Riki Hendrix band
- Spouse: Jenny

Riki Hendrix (born Ricky Goodloe) was an American rock guitarist. He was a cousin of Jimi Hendrix. Riki Hendrix started performing in the 1970s and was a member of two funk bands, Booty People and General Caine. He eventually found popularity as a solo artist, particularly in Singapore. He allegedly died in January, 2026.

== Background ==
Riki Hendrix was born in San Bernardino, California. A cousin of Jimi Hendrix, he came from a musical family and grew up in a household with jazz and classical musicians. He was originally known as Ricky Goodloe.

Though he was not well acquainted with his cousin, in his youth, Riki saw Jimi perform live.

Riki Hendrix played semi-pro baseball for a number of years. In the 1970s, he gave up his athletic career due to a knee injury. He then turned to music and changed his name.

Riki Hendrix toured Asia, Europe and Canada. He also toured the United States with former Band of Gypsys members, Buddy Miles and Billy Cox in a tribute to Jimi Hendrix.

== Career in bands ==
=== 1970s - 1980s ===
A childhood friend of Richard Le Mon Smith, he played in teenage bands with him. Along with Mitch McDowell, Robert Palmer, and Joe Phillips, they would be part of the group Booty People. They were recruited by B. B. Dickerson to open for the groups War and Tower of Power. They opened for War in 1976 at the Swing Auditorium in San Bernardino, and for Tower of Power the same year at the Santa Barbara Bowl.

The group had success with the hit "Spirit of '76" which peaked at no. 63 on the Cash Box Top 100 R&B chart, No. 55 on the Billboard Hot Soul Singles chart, and No. 44 on the Record World R&B Singles chart.

Mitch McDowell, Robert Palmer, and Joe Phillips left Booty People and formed General Caine. Hendrix also joined that group. He and Robert Palmer were the lead guitarists on the group's 1979 album Let Me In.

== Solo career ==
It was reported by Billboard in the magazine's 12 July 1980 issue that Riki Hendrix had been signed to the management company, California Talent Agencies.

=== 1990s and 2000s ===
Riki Hendrix played guitar on the Buddy Miles album, Miles Away from Home that was released in 1997.

Along with Rosa Lee Brooks, he performed with Australian singer Jessie Sparks when she was in Los Angeles.

Appearing in Singapore, Hendrix's performance was reviewed by Melvin Singh in the 21 November 2003 issue of The New Paper. With Hendrix bending his guitar strings to the point of almost breaking, women in the audience were giggling while the men were transfixed.

In December 2003, Hendrix played at Singapore's Summer of Love 2003 concert. He and his four-piece band appeared on stage with a children's choir, performing the song "Children of Tomorrow".

Playing the 8:25pm – 8:50pm slot, Hendrix was the second opening act for Deep Purple at Fort Canning Park in Singapore on 10 April 2004. According to the Highway Star, his solos on "Star Spangled Banner" and "Somewhere Over the Rainbow" went down well as did his energetic performance and showmanship.

Also in 2004, Hendrix's album, Rainbow Gypsy Child was released. The album which featured two original members from The Band of Gypsys was mastered by Jaeson Jarrett and recorded at Metrosound Studios (Granada Hills) with engineer Tom Thomas.

On 20 November 2004, Riki Hendrix jammed on stage with Leon Hendrix, Buddy Miles and Buddy Miles Express guitarist Marlo Henderson at the La Jolla Hard Rock cafe.

Credited as Rick Hendrix, he also played on The Band of Gypsys Return album that featured Buddy Miles and Billy Cox, which was released in 2006.

=== 2010s and 2020s ===
On 3 July 2011, he played at the American Club in Hanoi for the Fourth of July Celebrations.

In 2019, Riki and Leon Hendrix, with members of the Steve Miller Band (Greg Douglass), Blood Sweat & Tears, a Sha Na Na member (Jocko) and local rocker Roni Lee were booked to play at the Full Circle Saloon on 8528 Magnolia Avenue in Santee, California.

His group, the Riki Hendrix Experience was booked as the headline act, appearing at the Wrightwood Place Performance Center on 10 June 2023. Hendrix and his band, which was made up of Gina Bee on keyboards, Dennis Sanchez on bass guitar, and "Thumper" Prudhome on drums played at the event in Wrightwood, CA. It was well received.

== Personal life ==
It was announced in the 19 July 2003 of The Straits Times and later that year by The New Paper that Riki Hendrix was to marry a Singaporean girl.

== Death ==
According to Lucas Campbell of the Rock of Ages Radio Show, Riki Hendrix died in January 2026.

== Discography ==
Albums
Act	Release	Catalogue	Year	Notes #
Riki Hendrix	Rainbow Gypsy Child	PPL Records P-CDA-0604-3	2004	

Band member or guest artist
Act	Release	Catalogue	Year	Format	Tracks	Notes # album
Booty People	"Spirit Of '76" / "Anyway I'm Busted"	Calla Records CAS-110	1976	single		band member
Booty People	Booty People	ABC Records AB-998	1977	album		band member
Booty People	" Slappin' Five" / "Somethin' Simple"	ABC Records ABC 22035	1977	single		band member
Booty People	"Booty People" / "Slappin' Five"	ABC Records ABC 22035	1977	single		band member
General Caine	Let Me In	Groove Time Records GTR-1001	1978	album		band member
General Caine	The Best of General Caine (Pure Funk)	Groove Time Records GTR-1006	1991	album		band member
Buddy Miles	Miles Away from Home	Hip-O Records HIPD-40141	1997	album	"The Change", "Solve This Problem"	guitar
Billy Cox & Buddy Miles	The Band of Gypsys Return	Image Entertainment EXP3432, Experience Hendrix EXP3432	2006	album	"Manic Depression"	guitar
