= Spirit of '76 (song) =

Song by Booty People
- A-side: "Booty People"
- B-side: "Anyway I'm Busted"
- Released: 1976
- Length: 3:42
- Label: Calla CAS-110
- Composer: (J. Philips - R. Smith - W. Goodloe - M. McDowell - R. Palmer - M. Dickerson)
- Producers: B.B. Dickerson, Jerry Goldstein (executive producer)

Booty People singles chronology
"Spirit of '76" (1976)	"Slappin' Five" (1977)

"Spirit of '76" was a 1976 single for the band Booty People. It became a hit for the group that year, registering on the Billboard, Cash Box and Record World charts.

== Background ==
The credited composers for "Spirit of '76" are, J. Phillips, R. Smith, W. Goodloe, P. McDowell, R. Palmer & M. Dickerson. Backed with "Anyway I'm Busted", it was released on Calla CAS-110 in 1976. The single was produced by B.B. Dickerson and Far Out Productions.

== Reception ==
ABC vice president Otis Smith was in a room with Steve Gold and Jerry Goldstein of Far Out Productions who produced the record. Smith played a tape by Booty People and said that he loved the record as a single, but he just didn't know. He said that he thought it had to come down. Goldstein interjected with "Way down". Gold closed his eyes and put his head back and was apparently grooving to the music while Goldstein was dancing in the room. Gold screamed out, "Now That's funk. Great damn, I love it". Smith then said to get this one ready to go right away and said he going to show them why he was the best at his job and would break in the record for them.

The record was a single pick in the 17 April issue of Record World. The reviewer said that spirit of 1976 could be heard on the disco floors as the record confirmed, and the solid red, white and blue groove was due to producer B.B. Dickerson who is a member of the group War.

== Charts ==
=== Cash Box ===
"Spirit of '76" made its debut at no. 100 on the Cash Box Top 100 R&B chart for the week of 22 May 1976. On its fifth week in the chart, for the week of 19 June, the single peaked at no. 63.

=== Billboard ===
The single debuted in the Billboard Hot Soul Singles chart at no. 88 for the week of 29 May 1976. At week five, for the week of 26 June, the single reached no. 55.

=== Record World ===
For the week of 12 June, "Spirit of '76" moved up two places from 53 to 51 on the Record World R&B Singles chart. The following week, the single made its debut at no. 138 on the Record World 101 - 150 Singles chart. The single peaked at no. 44 on the R&B Singles chart for the week of 3 July. For the week of 10 July, the single had reached no. 130 on the 101 - 150 Singles chart.

== Musicians ==
- Joe Phillips
- Mitch McDowell
- Rick Hendrix
- Robert Palmer
