= Artur Menezes =

Brazilian musical artist (born 1985)

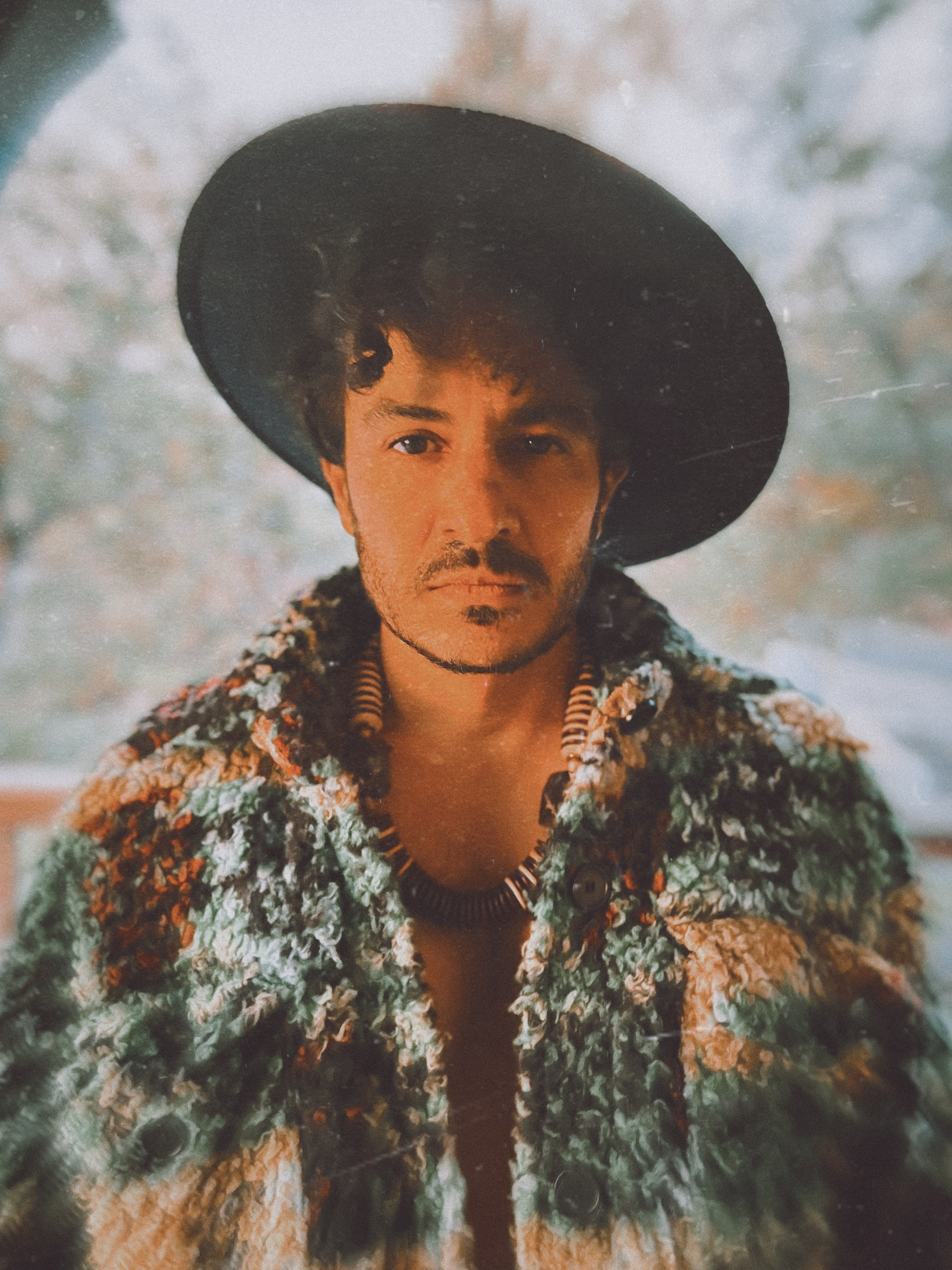

Background information
- Born: July 15, 1985 (age 41); Fortaleza, Ceara, Brazil
- Genres: Blues, blues rock
- Occupations: Guitarist, singer, songwriter
- Instruments: Guitar, vocals
- Years active: 1999–present
- Website: Official website

Artur Menezes (born July 15, 1985) is a Brazilian blues and blues rock guitarist, singer and songwriter, based in Los Angeles, California. He has released six albums since 2010, with the most recent EP, AM/FM (2023), being released by Black Hill Records.

American magazine Guitar Player said about Menezes: "His playing is a distinctive blend of fiery, hard-rocking blues that at times borders on shred, combined with an ability to effortlessly switch gears into swinging, jazz grooves. His Brazilian roots add a unique flavor to the mix and further distinguish his playing from that of his contemporaries. Menezes' songwriting sparkles as it switches between straight-ahead blues and funk-flavored workouts, and his vocals channel the deep emotional content of his songs as effectively as his guitar playing."

== Life and career ==
Artur Menezes was born in Brazil and was interested in music as a young child. His first interest was rock, spurred on by his elder brother. His outlook changed when he was around 13 years old and able to play the electric guitar. He experienced a different sounding track on the radio and discovered he had heard blues for the first time. The moment was life changing. Menezes spent a lot of time alone growing up as his parents had separated, and his mother worked long hours as a university teacher and then part time singer in the evenings.

As his guitar playing flourished, he remained a blues devotee but utilised other styles such as psychedelic rock, funk, and baião, a rhythm local to his own north east region of Brazil. Due to family circumstances, Menezes lived briefly in Chicago, Illinois, United States, in 2006, 2007, and 2011. While there he had the opportunity to participate in jam sessions involving John Primer, Linsey Alexander, Phil Guy, and Jimmy Burns, among others. These took place in Chicago bars and clubs including Kingston Mines, Smokey Daddy, Rosa's, Vine Tastings and Katherina's.

In 2009, in an effort to disseminate and expand access to blues across Brazil, Artur Menezes, alongside musicians Leonardo Vasconcelos and Roberto Lessa, co-founded the society 'Casa do Blues' ('House of Blues') in Ceara State, Brazil, which promotes weekly shows with free admissions, workshops and lectures about the blues. He remained on the board of the project until early 2013.

In 2010, Menezes recorded his debut album, Early To Marry, which was released by Tratore Brasil.

In 2012, Menezes opened for Buddy Guy's South American tour in Brazil. commented "I guess it has been the best moment of my career so far. I had the great chance to play with him in a jam session on his club Buddy Guy's Legends, in 2011". In 2012 and 2013, back home in Brazil, Menezes climbed to the summit of their blues music scene, headlining festivals.

In 2013, Menezes undertook a tour of Argentina, and released his sophomore album, 2. The same year, Menezes spoke at TEDx, an annual event globally licensed by TED, where he shared his musical journey in a presentation later released through the TEDTalks platform.

In 2014, Menezes was the headliner at the Augustibluus Festival in Haapsalu, Estonia, and he also performed at various club dates across the UK. In 2015, he undertook a tour in Mexico. The same year, Menezes issued his third studio album via Tratore Brasil, Drive Me.

In 2016, Menezes relocated to reside in Los Angeles, California. Since then, he has toured the U.S. playing in major events such as the Dallas Guitar Festival, Doheny Blues Festival, and Walla Walla Guitar Festival, among others.

In 2017, Menezes shared the stage with Joe Satriani, at Best of Blues and Rock festival in São Paulo, Brazil, performing for an audience of 20,000 people.

The following year, Menezes was the winner of the "Gibson/Albert King Award" for Best Guitarist by the Blues Foundation. He also entered alongside his backing ensemble the International Blues Challenge in Memphis, Tennessee, where they took third place in the Best Band category. He released his fourth album, Keep Pushing (2018), which was produced by Josh Smith, who also played rhythm guitar on the recording. The album contained ten tracks all composed by Menezes. In the US, Menezes opened for Bobby Rush in Los Angeles.

In 2019, Menezes was selected by Eric Clapton to perform at the Crossroads Guitar Festival, held at Madison Square Garden, New York after winning the Grand Prize in the PLAY Crossroads contest promoted by Ernie Ball and Eric Clapton himself. Menezes's fifth album, Fading Away, was released in October 2020 through Vizztone Records, and featured one song with Joe Bonamassa. It was also produced by Josh Smith.

In 2020, Menezes got his Green Card granted by the US government thanks to his artistic merit and contribution to blues. He also became a US citizen.

In 2021 and 2022, Artur toured Europe and South America, playing festivals and clubs in Germany, France, Ireland, Belgium, Portugal, Poland, Romania, and Estonia.

In 2023, Menezes performed for the second time at Eric Clapton's Crossroads Guitar Festival, sharing the stage with Christone "Kingfish" Ingram and Grace Bowers. He also headlined the Best of Blues and Rock Festival in Brazil alongside Buddy Guy, Steve Vai, and others.

His latest EP, AM/FM (2023), produced by Doug Boehm, was released by Black Hill Records. He chose the title AM/FM as an acronym for 'Artur Menezes Fuzz Machine'. Rocking fuzz pedals for "a psychedelic, nasty, and vintage sound", the name became a joke in the studio when the producer asked Menezes to name the Pro Tools session. He lives up to this moniker with the unmistakable and undeniable fuzzy distorted tone.

He was also part of the last two Experience Hendrix Tours (2024 and 2025).

While working on his next album, Menezes is set to release a new EP, covered. vol. i, featuring covers of songs that have inspired a new direction in his sound. The first taste of this evolution came in June 2025 with the release of "I Got Mine", a heavy psychedelic blues rock take of the song by The Black Keys, while second single is a reinterpretation of D'Angelo's "Till It's Done (Tutu)".

When not on tour, Artur Menezes also teaches guitar at the Musicians Institute in Hollywood, Los Angeles, and has online courses and masterclasses.

== Discography ==
=== Albums ===
Year	Title	Record label
2010	Early To Marry	Tratore Brasil
2013	2	Tratore Brasil
2015	Drive Me	Tratore Brasil
2018	Keep Pushing	Self-released
2020	Fading Away	Vizztone Records
2023	AM/FM (EP)	Black Hill Records
