= Sebastian Lane =

American musician (born 1992)

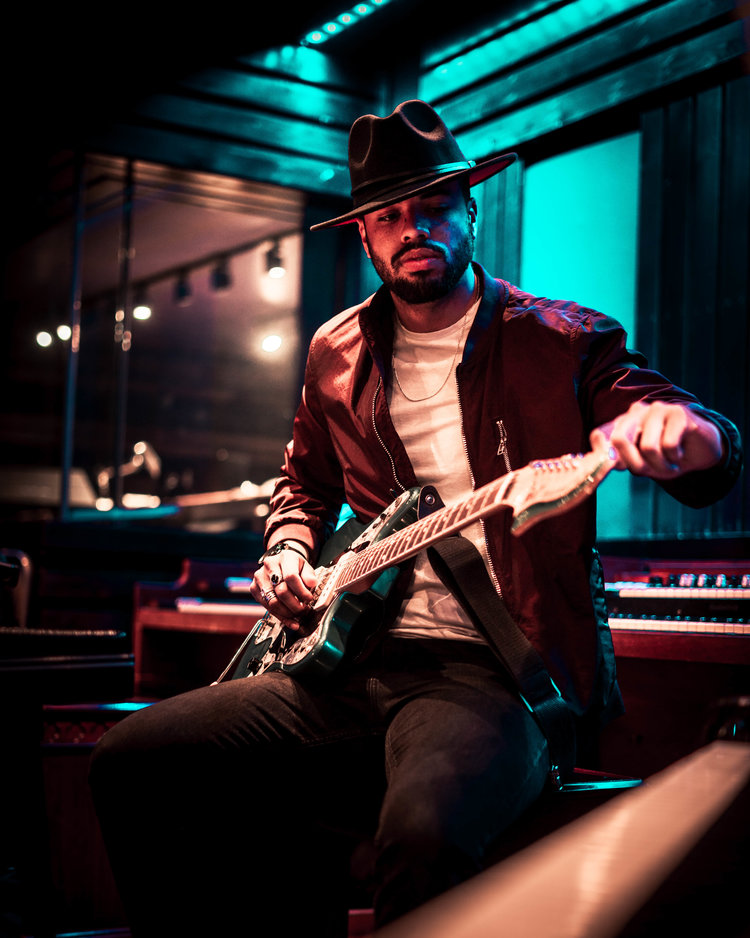
- Lane at Make Believe Studios in Omaha, Nebraska
- Born: October 1992 (age 33); Chicago, Illinois, United States
- Education: B.A. 2015 Hastings College, M.D. University of Nebraska Medical Center (2019), Creighton University 2026 (General Surgery Residency)
- Alma mater: Hastings College
- Notable work: Walkin' By Myself - 2018
- Style: Rock, Blues Rock, Southern Rock
- Awards: Artist of the Year Nominee 2018 - OEAAs; Best Blues Artist Nominee 2018 - OEAAs; Best Blues Artist Nominee 2019 - OEAAs
- Website: sebastianlaneband.com

Sebastian Lane (born October 1992, Chicago, Illinois, United States) is an American rock and roll / blues / Southern rock singer-songwriter, guitarist and Medical Doctor.

== Early life ==
Sebastian Lane was born to his father, the American blues artist, Jimmy D. Lane and French mother, Isabelle. He is the grandson of Blues Hall of Fame inductee Jimmy Rogers, who gained prominence as the guitarist for the Muddy Waters Band.

Lane began playing guitar at age three. Growing up, he found influence and drew inspiration from his father and grandfather, as well as musicians such as Stevie Ray Vaughan, Eric Clapton, Jimi Hendrix, Kenny Wayne Shepherd, Doyle Bramhall II, The Rolling Stones, Gary Clark Jr and Freddie King. Lane never took guitar lessons. He learned by ear, teaching himself by listening to various songs repetitively.

After the passing of his grandfather in 1997, the Lane family left Chicago, Illinois and moved to Salina, Kansas, where Sebastian's father was hired by Chad Kassem to work at Blue Heaven Studios and APO Records. Blue Heaven Studios and Kassem hosted a yearly festival known as "Blues Masters at the Crossroads". This festival was geared towards bringing in blues musicians from the south and around the country who did not have much longer to live and share their art. Surrounded by this atmosphere further attracted Lane to blues culture and inevitably led him to pursue a similar path.

Since childhood, Lane has split his interests between music and following his passions for science and medicine. His interest in medicine arose after the passing of his grandfather, secondary to colon cancer. His family moved several more times before settling in Vancouver, Canada after his father remarried. Lane attended four high schools before graduating from Sullivan Heights Secondary School in the spring of 2011.

He enrolled at Hastings College, where he graduated with his Bachelor's degree in biology. He was then accepted at University of Nebraska Medical Center for medical school where he graduated in 2019. He was then accepted into General Surgery Residency at Creighton University where he completed his training in 2026. He is now a General Surgeon in Omaha, Nebraska and Council Bluffs, Iowa where he serves as the Trauma Medical Directory for CHI Health Mercy Hospital.

He released his debut album Walkin' By Myself in July 2018 while on a rotation in Pediatrics at Children's Hospital of Omaha.

== Career ==
Lane has worked for other artists as a studio guitarist and ghost writer.

=== Sebastian Lane Band ===
In 2018 he decided to focus on his own music and developed the Sebastian Lane Band. This group is a modern age rock band with influences from Lane's blues heritage. The group features Lane on vocals and lead guitar, Ben Curran on guitar, Dain Armbrust on bass guitar, Kevin Fries on drums and Mitch Towne on keyboards. Occasionally, Grace Calderon, joins the ensemble. Several of these musicians started with the Omaha Blues Society and their program called Blues Ed. Curran was accepted into Berklee College of Music.

Lane released his debut album, Walkin' By Myself in July 2018. The album featured Eric Gales on the song "Jezebel" and Christone "Kingfish" Ingram on a cover of blues standard "Catfish Blues". The album, and their growing support in the midwest landed them opening spots with Jimmie Vaughan, Robert Randolph, Marcus King Band, Eric Gales, Joanne Shaw Taylor, Indigenous, Anthony Gomes, Albert Castiglia and others.

Lane was nominated as both "Artist of the Year" and "Best Blues Artist" in the Omaha Entertainment and Arts Awards. Their album accumulated over a quarter million streams on Apple Music and Spotify across over 30 different countries.

=== Medical Career ===
Lane completed General surgery Residency (medicine) training in 2026 at Creighton University and is now serving as the Trauma Medical Director at CHI Health - Mercy hospital while operating as a General Surgeon in Omaha, Nebraska and Council Bluffs, Iowa.

== Albums ==
- Walkin' By Myself (2018, Make Believe Studio) - featuring Eric Gales and Christone "Kingfish" Ingram
