= Soldier for the Blues =

Studio album by Little Jimmy King
- Released: 1997
- Recorded: 1997
- Studio: Royal
- Genre: Blues, blues rock, soul
- Label: Bullseye Blues
- Producer: Willie Mitchell

Little Jimmy King chronology
Something Inside of Me (1994)	Soldier for the Blues (1997)	Live at Monterey (2002)

Soldier for the Blues is an album by the American musician Little Jimmy King, released in 1997. He was backed by his band, the King James Version Band. The album is dedicated to B. B. King. King supported it with a North American tour.

== Production ==
Recorded at Royal Recording, in Memphis, the album was produced by Willie Mitchell, who also found six of the songs. King played his Gibson Flying V lefthanded, with the strings upside down, and in standard tuning. Leroy Hodges played bass on the album.

== Critical reception ==
Professional ratings
Review scores
Source	Rating
All Music Guide to the Blues	3/5 stars
Robert Christgau	(3-star Honorable Mention)
The Commercial Appeal	3.5/4 stars
The Encyclopedia of Popular Music	2/5 stars
MusicHound Blues: The Essential Album Guide	3/5 stars
The Penguin Guide to Blues Recordings	4/4 stars
Pittsburgh Post-Gazette	2/4 stars
The Rolling Stone Jazz & Blues Album Guide	4/5 stars

The Toronto Star said that "King rips off rugged songs in rock-blues territory with a pleasing light voice and—above all—an outstanding searing guitar sound". The Pittsburgh Post-Gazette praised the "funky instrumental approach [and] smoky vocals". Guitar Player noted that King's "snarling, nasal-toned leads and squealing overbends cut through his band's rolling, mid-tempo grooves with fierce conviction".

The Commercial Appeal called "We'll Be Together Again" "a bona fide classic". The Tampa Tribune deemed the album "an impressive collection of soul and electric blues". Knight Ridder lamented King's lack of "natural funk". Robert Christgau likened the best songs to the work of Robert Cray.

== Track listing ==
No.	Title	Length
1.	"Living in the Danger Zone"
2.	"Drawers"
3.	"I'm Doing Fine"
4.	"Life Is Hard"
5.	"I Don't Need Nobody That Don't Need Me"
6.	"We'll Be Together Again"
7.	"Soldier for the Blues"
8.	"You Ain't Bullet Proof"
9.	"It Takes a Whole Lot of Money"
10.	"Don't Wanna Go Home"
11.	"It Ain't the Same No Mo"
12.	"I Got Sick One Day"
