= Band AKA =

American soul musical group

- Origin: Los Angeles, California, United States
- Genres: Soul; funk; boogie
- Years active: 1981–1988, 2005
- Labels: PPL Records, Epic, Bouvier Records, Streetwise (UK)
- Past members: Kenneth Allen; St. Michael Fitzhugh; Wayne King Pulliam; Andrew Piesak; Jimmy Carter; J. James Jarrett; Booker Medlock

The Band AKA were an American male vocal/instrumental group who had a number of chart hits during the early 1980s.

== Background ==
Band AKA has been described as an American male vocal/instrumental of session musicians based in Los Angeles, California who were active during the 1980s. The membership of The Band AKA was fluid throughout their existence and essentially they were the creation of their producer and songwriter Jaeson James Jarrett.

== Career ==
The Band AKA recorded the single, "H.O.T. For The B.O.D." bw "Rock & Rollerskates" which was released on PPL PP-0102 in 1980. It was produced by J. James Jarrett and Arthur King. The song "Rock & Roller Skates" was also recorded by another PPL artist, Kings' Row.

"Grace", a track from their 1981 eponymous debut album entered the UK singles charts on 15 May 1982 after appearing for some weeks on a number of local dance and club charts. It reached a peak of number 41 in a five-week run on the chart. In its 12" single form "Grace" featured a memorable saxophone solo courtesy of Jimmy Carter.

It was reported by Record World in the magazine's 20 March 1982 issue that the Band AKA (The Band A.K.A.), according to their management firm, Garrett-Garnett were to be at the Roxy on the 17th and were in preparation for a Southern tour. Their new album on the PPL label was being distributed by MCA.

For the week of 22 March 1982, the group's album was at No. 1 on the Record Business Import Albums chart in the UK. In his Disco Dealer column, Barry Lazell mentioned how the album was previously scarce but had resurfaced in the UK on the PPL label and how it could be witnessed with its sudden crowning glory at the top of the RB Import chart that week. On 5 April 1982, the group's album was at back at No. 1 on the Record Business Import Albums chart in the UK.

"When You Believe in Love" was picking up some serious airplay in the UK. For the week of 24 June, Music Week had it recorded in its Breakers section, where it was on the A lists of Clyde, Tay, BBC-Wales and Swansea. It was also on the B list of stations, DevonAir, Plymouth and Trees. Pennine had it as a hit pick.

The group used the same formula from "Grace" that was used to record the follow-up "Joy". This song entered the chart on 5 March 1983, and reached number 24, remaining in the charts for 7 weeks. While the single was charting, the band had tour dates in the UK in April. They were, Braintree Essex Barn on 9th, Luton Pink Elephant on the 10th, Bournemouth Academy on the 11th, Bristol Dingwall's on the 12th, London Venue on the 15th and 16th, and Gillingham King Charles on the 17th.

The group recorded the single, "Ethiopia" that was released in 1985. It was exported to the UK via the New York-based Win Records. It was reported in April that year that negotiations were in process with several labels. The net proceeds were going to the Ethiopia Famine Relief Fund, which was being handled by World Vision Ethiopia Relief.

After having released three albums during the 1980s, the band ceased their activities in the late 80s.

== Discography ==
=== Albums ===
- The Band AKA (PPL Records, 1981)
- Men of the Music (Epic Records, 1983)
- Master of the Game (Bouvier Records, 1987)
- Ghosts (PPL Records, 2005)

=== Singles ===
Year	Song	UK
1981	"Steppin Out / New Beginning"	—
1981	"When You Believe in Love"	—
1981	"Grace"	41
1981	"H.O.T. for the B.O.D."	—
1982	"Funkdown"	—
1983	"If You Want to Know"	79
1983	"Joy"	24
1983	"Work Me All Over"	—
1984	"You and I"	—
1985	"Ethiopia"	—
"—" denotes releases that did not chart.
