= Mitch McDowell =

American musician (born 1954)

- Also known as: General Caine
- Born: 1954
- Origin: United States
- Died: 1992 (aged 37–38)
- Genres: Funk, soul
- Occupations: Musician, music producer, bail bondsman
- Instrument: Bass guitar
- Formerly of: Rocks, Booty People, General Caine, General Kane

Mitch McDowell was an American musician, bandleader, songwriter and producer. At least seven of his compositions were national hits for acts such as Booty People, General Caine, Ada Dyer, and Chico DeBarge.

== Background ==
Mitch McDowell was born in San Bernardino, California. He was one of six children. He also attended Military school while a teenager. His family was hoping that he would have a career in football, but it was music that he chose as his path.

McDowell's musical influences were, Sly Stone and George Clinton.

One composition of his was the impactful anti-drug song, "Crack Killed Applejack".

McDowell, was the leader of the ensemble General Caine (and later General Kane) which was a name he used for himself as well. A 1987 article by the Santa Cruz Sentinel explained how he was at the center of changing ensemble of musicians, and showed his photo as the non-existent general. The article also informed the reader that he was no relation to Motown labelmate Carrie McDowell.

== Career ==
McDowell formed the band Booty People. In 1976, the line up consisted of himself, Ray Goodlow, John Iaun, Rick Hendrix, Richard Smith and Robert Palmer.

Along with J. Phillips, R. Smith, W. Goodloe, R. Palmer & M. Dickerson, he composed "Spirit of '76". Backed with "Anyway I'm Busted", it was released on Calla CAS-110 in 1976. The single was produced by B.B. Dickerson and Far Out Productions. It peaked at no. 63 on the Cash Box Top 100 R&B chart, and No. 55 on the Billboard Hot Soul Singles chart.

He wrote the song "Girls" which was a chart hit for General Caine. It debuted at no. 82 in the Cash Box Top 100 Black Contemporary Singles chart. At week five on 18 September 1982 it peaked at no. 57.

McDowell's composition, "Where's the Beef?" was recorded by General Caine and released on Capitol B -5362 in 1984. A recommended single in the 19 May issue of Billboard, the reviewer referred to it as silly but good time funk.

McDowell wrote the song "Crack Killed Applejack" as a graphic message about the dangers of Cocaine. He had great success with it as well. Due to the name of his band General Caine being close to the world cocaine, he changed the band's name to General Kane. The song went to No. 12 on the R&B chart.

Working with Nadine McKinnor, he composed " I Bet Ya, I'll Let Ya" which was recorded by Ada Dyer and released in 1988. The song peaked at No. 33 on the Billboard R&B chart that year. He had more success that year with "Kiss Serious" that he co-composed with Rodney Trotter and Craig Owen for Chico DeBarge. The song peaked at No. 53 on the Billboard R&B chart.

== Death ==
In 1992, at age 37, McDowell who had been running his bail bond business was murdered along with his teenage nephew. The murderer of Mitch McDowell was never caught. In a sad twist, McDowell's son Caesar would arrive at the scene with his brother. Rather than being treated like victims, they were regarded as suspects, handcuffed and taken to jail. Some months later, without a father figure, any income and support, the 17-year-old Caesar McDowell committed his first armed robbery.

== Later years ==
Having done time in San Quentin where he was diagnosed with PTSD, Caesar McDowell finally got help to enable him to cope with his own trauma as well as the trauma he caused others. After serving twenty years of a life sentence for threatening his past girlfriend, he was released in 2020. He now uses his experiences to help others. He now works out of his office of Unite the People, Inc., which gives legal services at a reduced rate for families and friends of imprisoned people.
