= Fernando Noronha =

- Born: Fernando Nickhorn Noronha; Porto Alegre, Brazil
- Genres: Rock; blues; Texas blues
- Occupations: Musician, composer
- Instrument: guitar
- Years active: 1995–present
- Website: fernandonoronha.com

Fernando Noronha is a Brazilian Texas blues guitar player and composer, most known by being frontman of the Fernando Noronha & Black Soul band.

Fernando plays professionally since 1995 and during his entire career had opportunity to play and record with many artists, such as B. B. King, Buddy Guy, Ron Levy, Jeff Healey, Phil Guy, Coco Montoya, Holland K Smith and Chuck Berry. He is well known by "incorporate" the Texan style not only in his way of play but also in his costume used on stage.

About Fernando Noronha & Black Soul, B. B. King stated:

"I feel extremely happy and proud when I see such a young band playing the blues so well". – B. B. King

He was considered by HeavyMetal Brasil website one of the 30 best Brazilian guitarists.

== Discography ==
Fernando Noronha & Black Soul discography:

- Swamp Blues (1996)
- Heartful of Blues (1998)
- Blues from Hell (1999)
- Live in Europe (2001)
- Changes (2003)
- Bring It (2006)
- Meet Yourself (2010)
- Time Keeps Rolling (2015)
