= Lance Lopez =

American musician (born 1977)

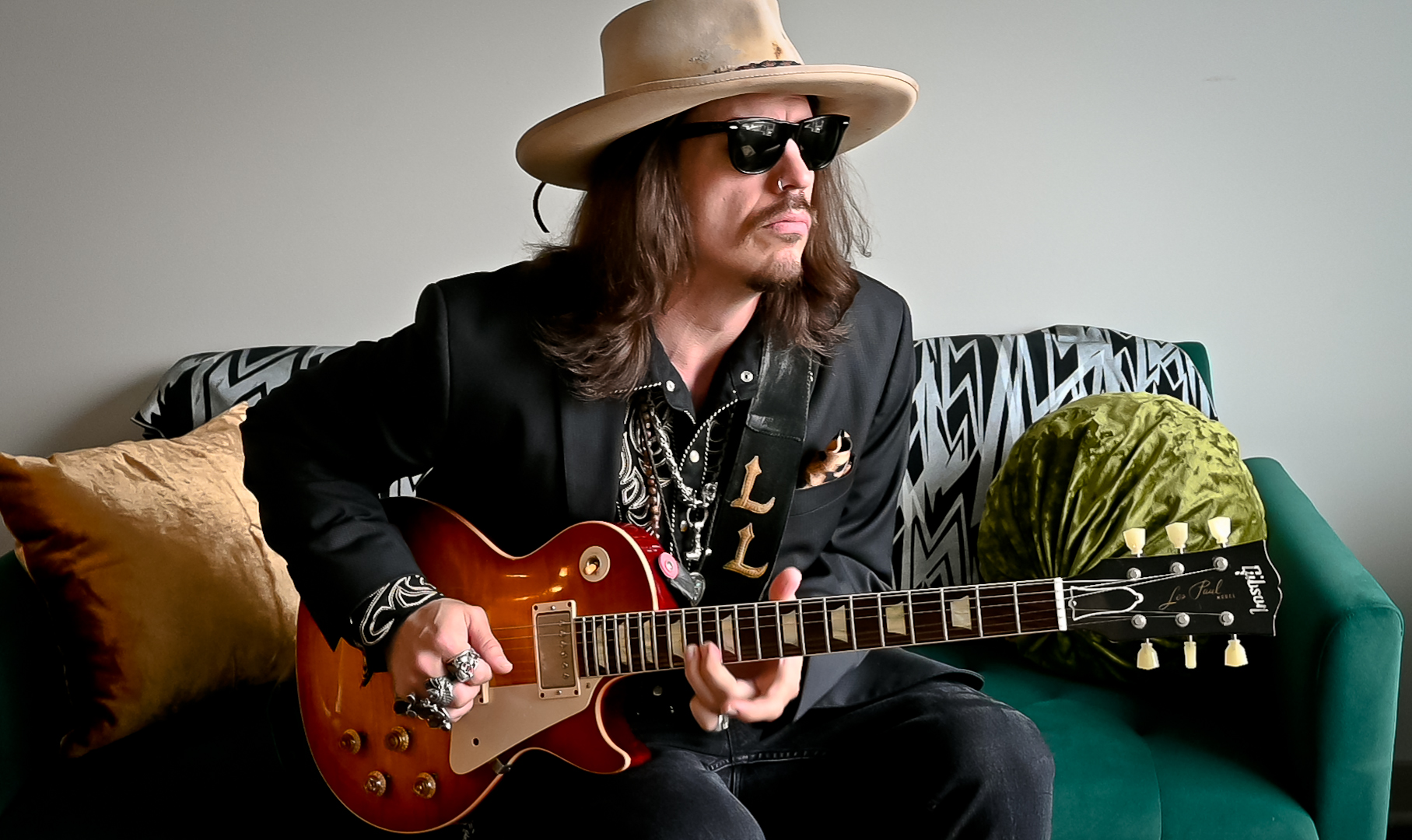
- Lance Lopez in Nashville, Tennessee 2024

Background information
- Born: September 30, 1977 (age 48); Shreveport, Louisiana, United States
- Genres: Blues rock, Texas blues
- Occupations: Singer, guitarist, songwriter
- Instruments: Vocals, guitar
- Years active: 1990s–present

Lance Lopez (born September 30, 1977) is an American blues rock and Texas blues singer, guitarist, and songwriter. Lopez has been influenced by Jimi Hendrix, B.B. King, and Stevie Ray Vaughan. Jeff Beck has described Lopez as "a very exciting and intense blues guitarist". Lopez has spoken over the years about being mentored by both Billy Gibbons and Johnny Winter. Lopez was aged 16 at the time he met Gibbons, and they have remained friends throughout.

== Life and career ==
He was born in Shreveport, Louisiana, United States. At the age of 12, he moved to Dallas, Texas, to live with his mother, and then on to New Orleans, Louisiana, two years later, to reside with his father. By the age of 14, Lopez was playing guitar in the local bars and clubs in the French Quarter, New Orleans, already a professional musician. His time in high school was split between New Orleans and Florida, after his father moved again. All this time, however, Lopez continued to play in local clubs on evenings and at the weekend. The family returned to Dallas when Lopez was 17 years old. He was recruited by Johnnie Taylor, and Lopez toured in his band around the Chitlin Circuit for six months. At the age of 18, Lopez was hired by Lucky Peterson with whom he toured the world for three years. During this time Lopez established a friendship with the drummer Buddy Miles, and he became the guitarist for a couple of brief spells for the Buddy Miles Express. Miles mentored Lopez, leading to Miles co-producing Lopez's debut album, First Things First (1998), along with Jay Newland.

In December 2000, Lopez and his band made their first touring schedule in Europe, which led to him to supporting both Steve Vai and Jeff Beck the following year. Also in 2001, Lopez opened for B.B. King in Texas, and his ensemble was granted the 'Blues Band of the Year Award' at the Dallas Music Awards. Lopez spent time recording his sophomore album for Grooveyard Records, who were based in Rochester, New York. Wall of Soul was recorded in 2003 and released the following year. It was co-produced by, and also featured Eric Gales; plus a guest appearance was made by Doug Pinnick of the band King's X. After the release of Wall of Soul, Lopez performed around Texas, opening shows for Los Lonely Boys and Joe Bonamassa. In 2005, Lopez alongside Tommy Shannon and Buddy Miles formed the short-lived, Band of Trouble. Lopez released his third album, Simplify Your Vision (2006). For his next release, Lopez played all of the musical instruments on the recording of his fourth album, Higher Ground (2007). He concluded his Grooveyard Records contract with a live album released the same year.

Over the period between 2008 and 2011, Lopez toured in Europe extensively, playing at larger music festivals and supporting acts including ZZ Top, Whitesnake, Def Leppard, and Rod Stewart. In 2009, Lopez had signed a new recording contract with MIG (Made In Germany) Music / String Commander, who were based in Hanover, Germany. In 2010, the album Salvation From Sundown, which was produced by Jim Gaines was released by MIG. It was issued in limited edition format alongside a DVD of the Rockpalast concert recorded on July 25, 2009. It was deliberately arranged in a Texas blues style, which led to Jeff Beck calling Lopez, "a very exciting and intense blues guitarist". In March 2012, MIG Music released the sixth album from Lopez, Handmade Music. As with the previous release, the album was produced by Jim Gaines and recorded at the Ardent Studios in Memphis, Tennessee.

In 2012, Supersonic Blues Machine was formed by Lopez, the drummer Kenny Aronoff, and the bassist and record producer Fabrizio Grossi. They released their debut album, West Of Flushing, South Of Frisco, which was recorded mainly by the three musicians separately and using Pro Tools technology to bring the various elements together. The same principle was used in selecting the guest musicians tracks to be added to the overall mix. The band was 'augmented' on the recording by Billy Gibbons, Robben Ford, Walter Trout, Warren Haynes, Eric Gales and Chris Duarte. Supersonic Blues Machine had its worldwide debut concert at the Holland International Blues Festival on June 4, 2016, in Grolloo, the Netherlands. The rigours of touring and the lifestyle caught up with Lopez around this time. Lopez stated "My own personal struggles were overcoming alcoholism, drug addiction and to start eating healthier, lose weight and exercise... I struggled for years drinking and drugging and eating badly while I was drinking... I became very overweight". Once recovered, Lopez noted about performing, "That still doesn't mean every night is perfect... but at least I can walk away and say I did the best I could and I was sober doing it".

His next release was Live in NYC (2016), which was issued on Cleopatra Records and produced by Paul Nelson. The recording come out of Lopez attending, and performing at, the 70th birthday party for Johnny Winter.

Lopez signed with the Mascot Label Group in November 2017, and his debut album on their Provogue Records imprint was Tell the Truth, which was released on March 2, 2018. It was produced by Fabrizio Grossi, and featured Jimmy Zavala.

== Discography ==
=== Albums ===
| Year | Title | Record label |
|---|---|---|
| 1998 | First Things First | Grooveyard Records |
| 2004 | Wall of Soul | Grooveyard Records |
| 2006 | Simplify Your Vision | Grooveyard Records |
| 2007 | Higher Ground | Grooveyard Records |
| 2007 | Live | Grooveyard Records |
| 2010 | Salvation From Sundown | MIG / String Commander |
| 2011 | Handmade Music | MIG / String Commander |
| 2016 | Live in NYC | Cleopatra Records |
| 2018 | Tell the Truth | Provogue Records |
| 2023 | Trouble Is Good | Cleopatra Records |

== See also ==
- Supersonic Blues Machine
- List of Texas blues musicians
