= General Caine =

American music group

- Also known as: General Kane
- Origin: California, United States
- Genres: Funk, rap, soul, R&B
- Years active: 1978–1988
- Labels: Tabu, Capitol, Motown
- Spinoff of: Booty People

General Kane (known as General Caine before 1986) was an American music group fronted by Mitch McDowell. They would go on to have a number of hits during the 1980s.

== Background ==
Mitch McDowell (born Mitchell Leon McDowell was born on June 29, 1954, in San Bernardino, California. He died January 22, 1992, in San Bernardino).

He formed the band Booty People. He would later form General Kane.

McDowell took the professional name General Kane in tribute to an officer who had supported his artistic ambitions when he was at military school.

== Booty People career ==
Booty People was made up of childhood friends, Richard Le Mon Smith aka Lemonsmyth, Ricky Goodloe aka Riki Hendrix, Mitch McDowell, Robert Palmer, and Joe Phillips. Riki Hendrix is related to Jimi Hendrix.

=== "Spirit of '76" ===
Success would come their way with the song "Spirit of '76". Producers, Steve Gold and Jerry Goldstein were in a room with ABC vice president Otis Smith. Smith played a tape by Booty People and said that he loved the record as a single, but he just didn't know. He said that he thought it had to come down. Goldstein interjected with "Way down". Gold closed his eyes and put his head back and was apparently grooving to the music while Goldstein was dancing in the room. He screamed out, "Now That's funk. Great damn, I love it". Smith then said to get this one ready to go right away and said he going to show them why he was the best at his job and would break in the record for them. Making its debut on the Cash Box Top 100 R&B chart for the week of 22 May 1976, and the Billboard Hot Soul Singles chart for the week of 29 May 1976. it peaked at no. 63. no. 55 respectively.

==== Further activities ====
Members of the group were photographed at a party in Los Angeles which was hosted by their management and Far Out Production. This was for them being signed to ABC and the group WAR for their November release of the album Love Is All Around, which contained previously unreleased material. The Booty People members in the photo were, Ray Goodlow, John Iaun, Rick Hendrix, Mitch McDowell, Richard Smith and Robert Palmer.

In 1977, the group's self-titled debut album was released.

Booty People members such as Mitch McDowell, Robert Palmer, and Joe Phillips broke away and started General Caine.

== General Caine career ==
They released one album for MCA Records. Mitch assembled an eight-piece funk group and signed with Groove Time Records in 1978, releasing two albums: Let Me In (1978) and Get Down Attack (1980).

The group then moved to Tabu Records. General Caine's third album entitled Girls features the hit song "For Lovers Only". The radio station 93.1 FM WZAK in Cleveland (Ohio) penned "For Lovers Only" as a theme song for their late night segment with the same title. Their debut single for the Tabu label and the fourth album Dangerous with many songwriting chores, were done by Johnny Guitar Carson.

After a brief appearance at Capitol Records with one single released called "Where's the Beef?" (a popular catch phrase at that time), a slimmed down version of the group with new writers and producers signed a recording contract with Motown Records in the mid-1980s. With a slightly new name (from General Caine to General Kane to reflect the changes in the band's lineup) and sound, they debuted for the new Motown Records label with the album In Full Chill (1986). "Crack Killed Applejack" was an uncompromising reflection of drug addiction on the inner city streets and reached number 12 in the black music charts despite being barred from airplay. Subsequent releases mellowed General Kane's approach without losing their commitment to the basic rap sound of the late 1980s. The group's album Wide Open included a romantic ballad, "Close Your Eyes", which featured vocals from two of the group's less prominent members, Cheryl McDowell and Danny Macon.

== Later years ==
Mitch McDowell pursued a career in law enforcement as a bail bondsman after leaving the music industry. He was murdered in January 1992 along with a nephew, Akili John Davis, 18, who worked in his office. Police noted that the office safe was empty.

General Kane's catalogue remained in print through the efforts of their former producer, Grover Wimberly III, who runs his own label, Groove Time Records.

== Musicians ==
- Mitch McDowell, bass, percussion and lead vocals / rap
- Wayne Sanders
- Wayman Ballinger, lead and background vocals
- Kevin Goins, lead and background vocals
- Rodney Trotter, lead and background vocals
- Daryl Haywood, background vocals
- Nelson Hardwick Jr., bass vocals
- Trey Stone, lead guitar
- Robert Palmer, lead guitar
- Rick Hendrix, lead guitar
- David Chadwick, keyboards
- Jim Morrison, keyboards
- Tony Patler, keyboards
- Brenda Jackson, keyboards
- Robert G. Summers, keyboards
- Johnny "Guitar" Carson, lead guitar
- Dave Dobler, keyboards and synthesizers
- Craig Owen, drums, background vocals
- Alvino Bennett, drums
- Gerry Davis, drums
- Marion McQuery, trumpet
- David Findley, trumpet
- David Jarimillo, trumpet
- Gary Metz, alto sax
- Jimmy Carter, tenor and soprano saxophone
- Sidney Washington, background vocals

== Discography ==
=== Albums ===
- Let Me In (1978)
- Get Down Attack (1980)
- Girls (1982)
- Dangerous (1983)
- In Full Chill (1986)
- Wide Open (1987)

=== Singles ===
Year	Song	US R&B
1981	"Shake"	—
1981	"L.R.J. Pop"	—
1981	"Get Down Attack"	—
1982	"Don't Stop"	—
1982	"The Girls"	72
1983	"Ooh, Aah"	—
1983	"Bomb Body"	74
1984	"Where's the Beef?"	—
1986	"Can't Let Go"	—
1986	"Crack Killed Applejack"	12
1986	"Hairdooz"	—
1986	"House Party"	—
1987	"Girl Pulled the Dog"	33
"—" denotes releases that did not chart.
