= Supersonic Blues Machine =

American band

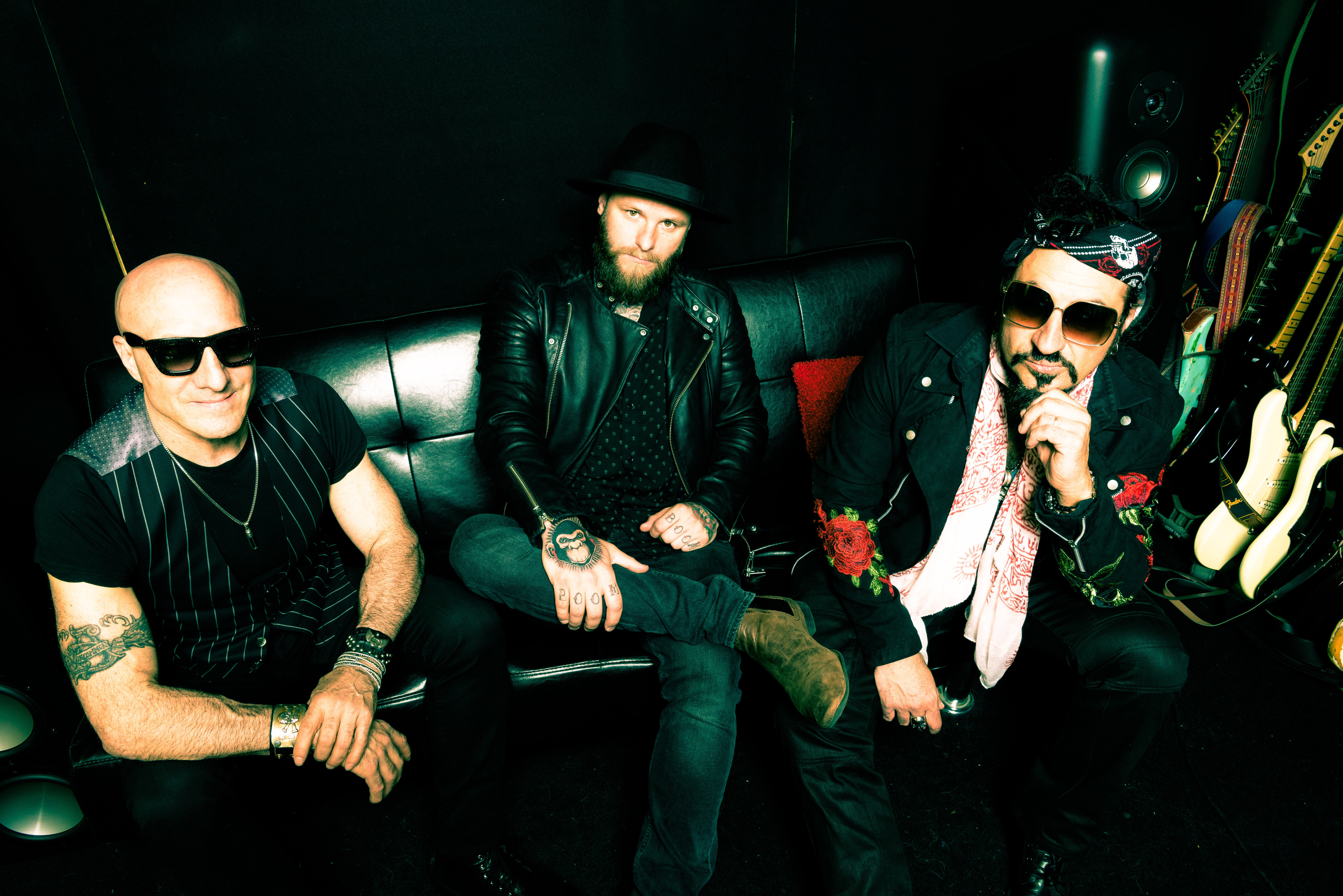
- Supersonic Blues Machine in 2018

Background information
- Origin: California, United States
- Genres: Blues; Soul; Alternative
- Years active: 2015–Present
- Labels: Provogue, Mascot
- Members: Kris Barras; Kenny Aronoff; Fabrizio Grossi

Supersonic Blues Machine is an American, California-based trio, consisting of drummer Kenny Aronoff, producer/bass player Fabrizio Grossi and singer/guitarist Kris Barras, currently signed to Provogue Records. Their sound is predominantly based on American roots music, but stretches out to reach different styles of the genre, such as contemporary blues, funk R&B, rock 'n' soul, and alternative. Their "claim to fame" is to always enlist a noticeable line up of guests and sidemen, both on their records as on their live shows. They have recorded two albums, West of Flushing, South of Frisco (2016), Californisoul (2017), both of which reached the Top 15 of the Billboard Blues Albums chart, and released their first live record Road Chronicles - LIVE! in July 2019. Their third studio album VooDoo Nation was released in June 2022.

== History ==
The seeds of Supersonic Blues Machine were planted in 2010, and grew from the rhythm section of the Steve Lukather's side project jam band Goodfellas - bassist/producer Fabrizio Grossi and drummer Kenny Aronoff. The pair wanted to continue and expand the Goodfellas concept determined to create something more than just a “session ensemble for hire.”

It was in 2015 when ZZ Top's Billy Gibbons contacted Fabrizio to collaborate on the writing/production of a song for an up-coming commercial, that all the pieces came together. The song did not become part of the commercial, but it had Gibbons giving Fabrizio the suggestion to write “9 more songs” and start a band, with whom he would have loved to jam with whenever possible. Aronoff immediately tracked drums to it, and the song, "Running Whiskey," ended up becoming the first single of Supersonic Blues Machine's 2016 debut album, West of Flushing, South of Frisco.

While the band's first two studio albums saw Texas singer/guitarist Lance Lopez on guitar and lead vocals duty, their live album, Road Chronicles LIVE!, was the first one where the band was fronted by the English singer, Kris Barras (also signed to Provogue Records), who joined Supersonic Blues Machine in January 2018.

Their two studio albums and their live shows thus far have featured collaborations with artists including Steve Lukather, Billy Gibbons, Warren Haynes, Walter Trout, Robben Ford, Chris Duarte, Shemekia Copeland, Lucky Peterson, Jonny Lang, and Quinn Sullivan. They have performed in front of thousands of people around the world, including headlining performances at Holland's Grollo Blues Festival, Mumbai's Mahindra Blues Festival, Russia, Norway's Notodden Blues Festival, Spain, Italy, Belgium, Poland, and the UK's Ramblin' Man Fair.
