= Grace (Band AKA song) =

Song by Band AKA

from the album The Band
- A-side: "Grace"
- B-side: "Grace (Instrumental)"
- Released: 1981
- Label: Epic EPC A2376, Streetwave EPC A2376
- Composer: J. J. Jarrett
- Producer: J. James Jarrett

Band AKA singles chronology
"Grace" (1981)	"When You Believe in Love" (1981)

"Grace" is a 1981 single for American group, Band AKA. It was a chart hit in the UK.

== Background ==
"Grace" was written by J. James Jarrett. It was released in the UK on the Epic label.

The single was the first of three chart hits that Band AKA would have in the UK.

== Reception ==
The belated review by Tim Cooper of Eats, Drinks & Leaves on 25 June 2025 was positive with him referring to the record as an exuberant disco-funk anthem. Due to him listening to completely different music in 1981, it completely passed him by. He said that it was a dancefloor favorite and mentioned that the 12" version had a memorable sax solo by Jimmy Carter, not the former president.

== Airplay ==
"Grace" was at No. 97 on the Record Business Airplay Playlist chart. No other statistics could be given that week due to major production difficulties that the publication was experiencing. The following week it was at No. 87 and on the A list of five stations, a Breaker / Climber at two stations, and an Extra at two stations. For the week of 31 May, it was at No. 29 and on the A list of nine stations and a breaker / climber at four.

== Charts ==
=== Record Business, Top 100 ===
For the week of 10 May, "Grace" debuted at No. 92 in the Record Business Top 100 chart. "Grace" also peaked at No. 32 on the Record Business Top 100 Singles chart for the week of 31 May.

=== Record Business, Disco Top 50 ===
For the week of 10 May, "Grace" debuted at no 5 in the Record Business Disco Top 50 chart. Having been in the Disco Top 50 chart for three weeks, it peaked at No. 2 for the week of 24 May.

=== Record Business, Twelve Inchers ===
"Grace" made its debut in the Record Business 12 Inchers chart for the week of 10 May. It peaked at No. 1 on the Record Business 12 Inchers chart for the week of 24 May. It was still in the chart for the week of 21 June.

=== Record Mirror, Disco 45s ===
"Grace" peaked at No. 5 on the Record Mirror Disco 45s chart for the week of 12 June.

=== Record Mirror, Nightclub ===
"Grace" debuted at No. 47 in the Record Mirror Nightclub chart for the week of 5 June.

=== Other charts ===
Nationally in the UK it peaked at No. 41. The song also made the Melody Maker Soul top ten and the Northern Soul top ten.
