= Band of Gypsys (band) =

American psychedelic rock band, 1969–1970

- Also known as: The Band of Gypsys
- Origin: United States
- Genre: Rock
- Years active: 1969–1970
- Labels: Reprise records, Polydor Records
- Past members: Jimi Hendrix; Billy Cox; Buddy Miles

Band of Gypsys was a short-lived psychedelic rock trio led by American guitarist Jimi Hendrix. The group represented the new musical direction Hendrix was taking in 1969.

== Background ==
The band was composed of Jimi Hendrix, Billy Cox and Buddy Miles. The band represented a new musical direction for Jimi Hendrix, and was his first all-black musical ensemble. Some have suspected that Michael Jeffery, Hendrix's manager, played a part in the ensemble's demise.

== Career ==
The group made their live debut at the Fillmore East on New Years Eve 1969. This was the first of the two-night, four-show appearances that they were booked for. They started the show off with "Power of Soul". The next song was "Lover Man" and was followed by "Hear My Train A Comin'".

Throughout their brief existence, the band faced major problems. One of them was Mike Jeffrey's dislike for Buddy Miles and his desire to get the Jimi Hendrix Experience back together. Another problem was Hendrix's drug use.

The Band of Gypsys played their last concert at the Winter Festival for Peace at Madison Square Garden on 28 January 1970. The show was a disaster with Hendrix messing up on "Who Knows" and leaving the stage. Buddy Miles accused Jeffrey of slipping in acid tabs to sabotage the show. Miles was then fired by Jeffrey.

Three months after the shows, the live album Band of Gypsys was released in the United States, where it peaked at No. 5 on the charts. The record served as a contract obligation fulfilment for Hendrix. He had agreed to deliver an album to Capitol Records to resolve a legal issue stemming from his 1965 contract with Ed Chalpin.

== Later years ==
In 1984, Buddy Miles got together with Tommy Saunders and Hendrix tribute artist, Randy Hansen at the Kabuki Theater in San Francisco. Using material from the Band of Gypsys album, they performed "Machine Gun", "Message of Love", and "Who Knows". Other Hendrix songs were, "Manic Depression", "Spanish Castle Magic", "Little Wing", "Castles Made of Sand", "Hey Joe", "Fire", "Red House", "All Along the Watchtower", "The Star-Spangled Banner" and "Purple Haze". They finished off with Miles' own song, an eleven-minute version of "Them Changes". The show was broadcast at the time on radio station, KQRQ-FM.

It was reported by Billboard in 2003 that Buddy Miles was suing the estate of Jimi Hendrix over unpaid royalties. Miles stated that he had hardly received any money for his work with the band nearly thirty years prior.

Buddy Miles and Billy Cox played on Riki Hendrix's Rainbow Gypsy Child album that was released in 2004. Also in 2004, Miles and Cox reunited and with guest artists, they recorded material that would appear on the 2006 album, The Band of Gypsys Return.

In June 2013, Billy Cox, the sole surviving Band of Gypsys member embarked on a tour, paying tribute to Hendrix. The four-piece ensemble included two guitarists, Dani Robinson and Byron Bordeaux.

On 18 December 2015, Buddy Miles and Billy Cox were booked to appear at the Ventura Theater with Jimi Hendrix's cousin Riki Hendrix. The event's host was Rosa Lee Brooks.

In 2018, a two-CD album, Return of the Band of Gypsys, San Francisco '84 was released. It was a recording of Buddy Miles. Billy Cox and Randy Hanson in concert at the Kabuki Theater in San Francisco. The two-CD album that was released in 2018 included an interview with Buddy Miles and another with Al Hendrix.

== Discography ==
=== Singles ===
- "Stepping Stone" / "Izabella" - 1970 (Credited to Hendrix Band of Gypsys)
- "Changes" / "Message to Love" - 1970 (Credited to Hendrix Band of Gypsys)

=== Albums ===
- Band of Gypsys - 1970 (Credited to Jimi Hendrix)
- Band of Gypsys 2 - 1986 (Credited to Jimi Hendrix)
- Songs for Groovy Children: The Fillmore East Concerts - 2019 (Credited to Jimi Hendrix)

=== Other projects ===
- The Band of Gypsys Return - 2016
- Return of the Band of Gypsys, San Francisco '84 - 2018
