= The Singles Collection (Jimi Hendrix album) =

Compilation album / Box set by Jimi Hendrix
- Released: December 9, 2003
- Recorded: 1966–1970
- Genres: Rock, psychedelic rock, acid rock, blues rock
- Length: 86:00
- Label: MCA

Jimi Hendrix chronology
Live at Berkeley (2003)	The Singles Collection (2003)	Hear My Music (2004)

The Singles Collection is a posthumous compilation album by Jimi Hendrix, released in 2003 by MCA Records. The album is made up of ten discs, each of which contains one single released by Hendrix, including some after his death.

== Track listing ==
All songs were written by Jimi Hendrix, except where noted.

=== Disc one ===
1. "Hey Joe" (Billy Roberts)
2. "Stone Free"

=== Disc two ===
1. "Purple Haze"
2. "51st Anniversary"

=== Disc three ===
1. "The Wind Cries Mary"
2. "Highway Chile"

=== Disc four ===
1. "Burning of the Midnight Lamp"
2. "The Stars That Play with Laughing Sam's Dice"

=== Disc five ===
1. "Foxy Lady"
2. "Manic Depression"

=== Disc six ===
1. "Crosstown Traffic"
2. "Gypsy Eyes"

=== Disc seven ===
1. "Voodoo Child (Slight Return)"
2. "Hey Joe" (Roberts)
3. "All Along the Watchtower" (Bob Dylan)

=== Disc eight ===
1. "Stepping Stone"
2. "Izabella"

=== Disc nine ===
1. "Dolly Dagger"
2. "Night Bird Flying"

=== Disc ten ===
1. "Little Drummer Boy" (Katherine K. Davis)
2. "Silent Night" (Josef Mohr, Franz Gruber)
3. "Auld Lang Syne" (Robert Burns, Traditional, arr. Hendrix)
4. "Three Little Bears"

== Personnel ==
- Jimi Hendrix – guitar, lead vocals, electric harpsichord on track 7, mellotron on track 7, kazoo on track 11, piano on track 11, bass on track 15
- Mitch Mitchell – drums, backing vocals on track 11
- Noel Redding – bass, backing vocals
- Dave Mason – bass on track 11, acoustic guitar on track 15
- Buddy Miles – drums on track 16 and 17
- Billy Cox – bass on tracks 16–19
