= Loose Ends (Jimi Hendrix album) =

- UK and Japan cover

Compilation album by Jimi Hendrix
- Released: February 1974 (Note: The original UK Polydor album shows "1973" as the copyright year. However, biographers Harry Shapiro and Cesar Glebbeek and later Hendrix producer John McDermott and long-time Hendrix engineer Eddie Kramer identify the release date as February 1974.)
- Recorded: July 1967 – July 1970
- Studio: Electric Lady, Record Plant, and Baggy's Studios in New York; Mayfair Studios in London
- Genre: Rock
- Length: 35:09
- Label: Polydor (international); Barclay (France)
- Producer: John Jansen

Jimi Hendrix UK chronology
Soundtrack Recordings from the Film Jimi Hendrix (1973)	Loose Ends (1974)	Jimi Hendrix (1975)

Alternative covers
- French cover of Loose Ends

- German cover of Loose Ends

Professional ratings
Review scores
Source	Rating
AllMusic	3/5 stars

Loose Ends is a posthumous compilation album by American guitarist Jimi Hendrix, released in February 1974 in the UK. It was the fourth and last Hendrix studio album released posthumously by manager Michael Jeffery. The album features a collection of outtakes and jams, with the exception of "The Stars That Play with Laughing Sam's Dice" which is the sole authorized track by Hendrix, in a new stereo mix by Eddie Kramer.

The album was engineered, mixed and compiled by John Jansen, who is listed on the record's sleeve as "Alex Trevor" because he did not wish his name to be on the album's credits. Additional engineering was provided by Eddie Kramer, Dave Palmer, Kim King, Gary Kellgren, Jack Adams, Tom Flye and Jim Robinson.

Reprise Records (Jimi Hendrix' label at the time), declined to issue this album in the US and Canada as they considered the material below standard. All the tracks on this album have been subsequently re-released on other official albums, in some form, except "Blue Suede Shoes". The UK, French, and German releases had different covers.

== Track listing ==
All tracks written by Jimi Hendrix, except where noted. The running times are taken from the original Barclay Records album (the Polydor release did not list durations) and may differ from other editions.

Side one
No.	Title	Later release	Length
1.	"Come Down Hard on Me Baby"	The Jimi Hendrix Experience (boxset)	2:58
2.	"Blue Suede Shoes" (Carl Perkins)		4:00
3.	"Jam 292"	Hear My Music	4:40
4.	"The Stars That Play with Laughing Sam's Dice"	South Saturn Delta	4:23
5.	"The Drifter's Escape" (Bob Dylan)	South Saturn Delta	3:02
Total length:			24:23

Side two
No.	Title	Later release	Length
1.	"Burning Desire"	The Baggy's Rehearsal Sessions	9:30
2.	"I'm Your Hoochie Coochie Man" (Willie Dixon)	The Baggy's Rehearsal Sessions	5:59
3.	"Have You Ever Been (To Electric Ladyland) (previously unreleased alternate recording)"	The Jimi Hendrix Experience (boxset)	1:32
Total length:			17:01 41:24

=== Notes ===
- The Stars That Play With Laughing Sam’s Dice was previously released on the UK edition of Smash Hits.
- Have You Ever Been (To Electric Ladyland) was previously released on Electric Ladyland.

== Personnel ==
- Jimi Hendrix – guitars, lead vocals
- Billy Cox – bass guitar, backing vocals on "Burning Desire"
- Mitch Mitchell – drums on "Come Down Hard on Me Baby", "Jam 292", "The Stars That Play with Laughing Sam's Dice", "The Drifter's Escape"
- Buddy Miles – drums on "Blue Suede Shoes", "Burning Desire", "I'm Your Hoochie Coochie Man"; backing vocals on "Burning Desire", "I'm Your Hoochie Coochie Man"
- Sharon Layne – piano on "Jam 292"
- Noel Redding – bass guitar on "The Stars That Play with Laughing Sam's Dice"

== Recording details ==
- "Come Down Hard on Me Baby" recorded at Electric Lady Studios in New York City on July 15, 1970
- "Blue Suede Shoes" recorded at Record Plant studios in New York City on January 23, 1970
- "Jam 292" recorded at Record Plant Studios on May 14, 1969
- "The Stars That Play with Laughing Sam's Dice" recorded at Mayfair Studios, New York City on July 18 and 29, 1967
- "The Drifter's Escape" recorded at Electric Lady Studios on June 17, 1970
- "Burning Desire" and "I'm Your Hoochie Coochie Man" recorded at Baggys in New York City on December 18 or 19, 1969
- "Have You Ever Been (To Electric Ladyland)" recorded at Record Plant Studios on June 14, 1968
