= South Saturn Delta =

Compilation album by Jimi Hendrix
- Released: October 7, 1997
- Recorded: July 1967 – August 1970
- Studios: London; New York City; Hollywood, California
- Genres: Rock; blues; jazz
- Length: 65:47
- Label: MCA
- Compilers: Janie Hendrix; Eddie Kramer; John McDermott

Jimi Hendrix chronology
Experience Hendrix: The Best of Jimi Hendrix (1997)	South Saturn Delta (1997)	Live at the Oakland Coliseum (1998)

South Saturn Delta is a posthumous compilation album by American rock musician Jimi Hendrix. Released in 1997 by Experience Hendrix (operated by his estate), it consists of material such as demo tapes, unfinished takes and alternate mixes, and previously released material, most of which Hendrix had been working on prior to his death in 1970.

== Background ==
Released prior to South Saturn Delta, First Rays of the New Rising Sun was Experience Hendrix's attempt at presenting Hendrix's planned fourth studio album. The album consists of songs previously released on his first posthumous albums The Cry of Love (1971), Rainbow Bridge (1971), and War Heroes (1972). South Saturn Delta collects five songs from the latter two then out-of-print albums that were not selected for First Rays.

Other tracks include "The Stars That Play with Laughing Sam's Dice", an early Jimi Hendrix Experience B-side single that saw release on the UK compilations Smash Hits (1968) and Loose Ends (1974), but never officially released in the US on a Jimi Hendrix album. Alternate takes and mixes of previously released songs and demos for new songs that Hendrix may or may not have completed for release to flesh out the album.

== Critical reception ==
Professional ratings
Review scores
Source	Rating
AllMusic	3.5/5 stars
Blender	3/5 stars
Encyclopedia of Popular Music	3/5 stars
Entertainment Weekly	A−
NME	5/10 stars
Pitchfork	7.6/10
The Rolling Stone Album Guide	3.5/5 stars

In a review for Rolling Stone, David Fricke viewed South Saturn Delta as an inconsistent compilation that is "less of a mess" than the albums that preceded it but does not explore deep enough into Hendrix's recordings. Robert Christgau wrote in Blender, "it establishes the listenability of Hendrix's dribs and drabs", despite being "discographically presumptuous". AllMusic senior editor Stephen Thomas Erlewine said the album serves as an attempt to "capture the full range of Hendrix's music through an alternate history ... an intelligently sequenced, listenable collection of some of the very best outtakes and rarities from Hendrix". James P. Wisdom from Pitchfork found the songs full of Hendrix's growing embrace of fusing rock, blues, and jazz sounds "in ways that had never been considered".

== Track listing ==
All tracks are written by Jimi Hendrix, except as noted.

No.	Title	Original release	Length
1.	"Look Over Yonder"	Rainbow Bridge	3:25
2.	"Little Wing"	Previously unreleased version; Axis: Bold as Love	2:44
3.	"Here He Comes (Lover Man)"	Previously unreleased	6:33
4.	"South Saturn Delta"	Previously unreleased alternate mix	4:07
5.	"Power of Soul"	Previously unreleased alternate version	5:20
6.	"Message to the Universe (Message to Love)"	Previously unreleased	6:19
7.	"Tax Free" (Bo Hansson, Janne Carlsson)	War Heroes	4:58
8.	"All Along the Watchtower" (Bob Dylan)	Previously unreleased alternate mix; Electric Ladyland	4:01
9.	"The Stars That Play with Laughing Sam's Dice"	UK single B-side to "Burning of the Midnight Lamp" (1967); Smash Hits	4:20
10.	"Midnight"	War Heroes	5:32
11.	"Sweet Angel (Angel)"	Previously unreleased demo	3:55
12.	"Bleeding Heart"	War Heroes	3:15
13.	"Pali Gap"	Rainbow Bridge	5:08
14.	"Drifter's Escape" (Bob Dylan)	Previously unreleased alternate version	3:05
15.	"Midnight Lightning"	Previously unreleased	3:07
Total length:			67:32

== Personnel ==
- Jimi Hendrix – guitar, vocals, bass guitar (tracks 4, 7 and 8)
- Mitch Mitchell – drums (tracks 1–4, 6–10, 13 and 14)
- Noel Redding – bass guitar (tracks 1, 3, 9 and 10)
- Billy Cox – bass guitar (tracks 5, 6, 12, 13 and 14), backing vocals (track 5)

Additional Personnel

- Rocky Isaac – drums (track 12)
- Brian Jones – percussion (track 8)
- Larry Lee – guitar (track 6)
- Dave Mason – 12-string guitar (track 8)
- Buddy Miles – drums and backing vocals (track 5)
- Juma Sultan – percussion (track 6)
- Jerry Velez – percussion (track 6)
- Unknown horn players – 2 trumpets, 2 saxophones, arranged by Larry Fallon (track 4)

== Recording details ==
Track	Location(s)	Recording date(s)
Track 1	TTG Studios, Hollywood, California	October 22, 1968
Track 2	Olympic Studios, London	October 14, 1967
Track 3	TTG	October 29, 1968
Track 4	Record Plant Studios, New York City	May 2 & June 14, 1968
Track 5	Record Plant	January 21 & February 3, 1970
Track 6	The Hit Factory, New York City	August 28, 1969
Track 7	Olympic; Record Plant	January 26 & 28, 1968; May 1, 1968
Track 8	Olympic	January 21 & 26, 1968
Track 9	Mayfair Studios, New York City	July 19, 1967
Track 10	Olmstead Studios, New York City	April 1 & 3, 1969
Track 11	Olympic	November 13, 1967
Track 12	Record Plant; Electric Lady	March 24, 1970; June 1970
Track 13	Electric Lady	July 1, 1970
Track 14	Electric Lady	June 17, July 19–20, & August 22, 1970
Track 15	Record Plant	March 23, 1970

== Sources ==
- McDermott, John (1997a). First Rays of the New Rising Sun (CD booklet). Jimi Hendrix. Universal City, California: MCA Records. MCAD-11599.
- McDermott, John (1997b). South Saturn Delta (CD booklet). Jimi Hendrix. Universal City, California: MCA Records. MCAD-11684.
