= Chris Stone (entrepreneur) =

American music producer and impresario

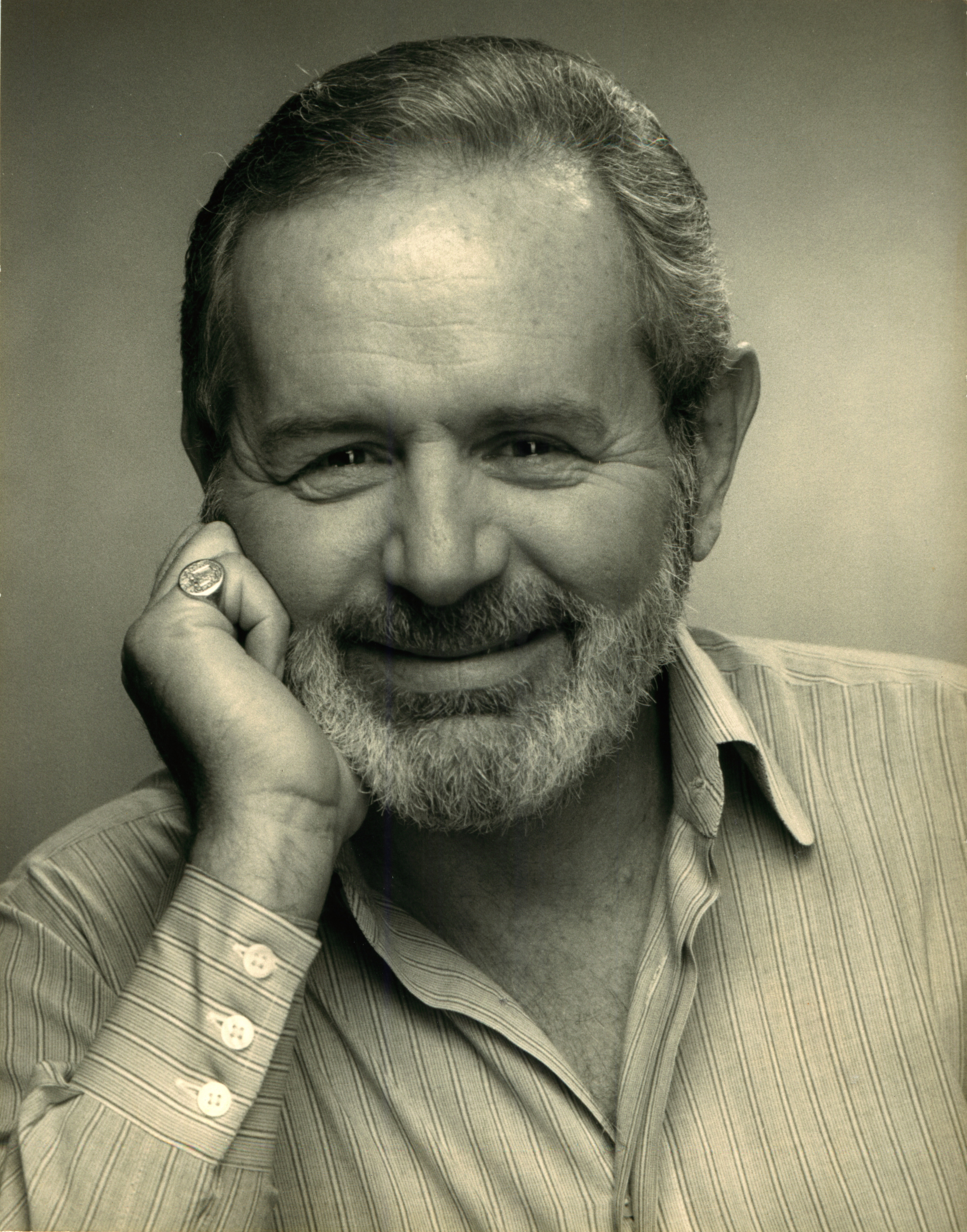
- Born: 1935; San Francisco, California
- Died: September 10, 2016 (aged 81)
- Occupations: Entrepreneur, executive, producer, writer, lecturer, professor
- Known for: Co-founder of the Record Plant; Co-founder of SPARS

Chris Stone (1935 – September 10, 2016) was an American music industry businessman and writer, and the co-founder with Gary Kellgren of the Record Plant recording studios. Stone founded Filmsonix in 1987, sold the Record Plant in 1989, and was the founder and CEO of World Studio Group. He co-founded the Society of Professional Audio Recording Services (SPARS), and he co-founded the Music Producers Guild of the Americas (MPGA), serving as executive director. The MPGA developed into the Producers & Engineers Wing of the National Academy of Recording Arts and Sciences (NARAS).

Stone earned an MBA from the UCLA Anderson School of Management, and he lectured online for the Berklee College of Music as well as in person for the USC Thornton School of Music where he was an associate professor. He contributed regularly as a recording industry journalist, his work published by Pro Sound News, Mix and Sound on Sound. He published a book, Audio Recording for Profit: The Sound of Money.

== Record Plant, New York City ==
In the mid-1960s, Stone earned a Master of Business Administration (MBA) degree from the UCLA Anderson School of Management and by late 1967 he was employed as the national sales manager of Revlon cosmetics. He and his wife Gloria welcomed their first child in New York City.

Stone was introduced to Gary Kellgren, a recording engineer working at several New York City recording studios on sessions for musicians such as Frank Zappa and Jimi Hendrix. Stone and Kellgren met because Kellgren's wife Marta was seven months pregnant and scared of the upcoming birth. Mutual friends thought that the two couples could talk about being parents and ease Marta's worry. Though they were "diametrically opposed" in nature, with Stone all business and Kellgren very creative, the two quickly became friends. During his lunch hours, Stone visited Kellgren in the studio, and began to see that Kellgren was not making full use of his genius. Stone noticed that Kellgren was getting only 4 percent of the money that studios were charging, and he helped Kellgren raise that to 20 percent.

Stone convinced Kellgren that the two of them, with $100,000 that Stone borrowed from Johanna C.C. "Ancky" Revson Johnson, could start a new recording studio, one with a better atmosphere for creativity. Johnson was a former model who became the second wife of Revlon founder Charles Revson, then divorced and married Ben Johnson. In early 1968 Kellgren and Stone opened a new studio at 321 West 44th Street, creating a living-room-type of environment for the musicians. It opened on March 13, 1968. The studio was one of the first to use an innovative 12-track recorder built by Scully Recording Instruments. As the studio was nearing completion, record producer Tom Wilson persuaded Hendrix producer Chas Chandler to book the Record Plant from April 18 to early July 1968, for the recording of the album Electric Ladyland. In early April, just prior to the start of the Jimi Hendrix Experience session, the band Soft Machine spent four days recording The Soft Machine; their debut album, produced by Wilson and Chandler, with Kellgren engineering.

In 1969, Kellgren and Stone sold the New York operation to TeleVision Communications (TVC), a cable television company that was broadening its portfolio. The purpose of the sale was to gain cash for expansion into Los Angeles with a second studio.

== Record Plant, Los Angeles ==
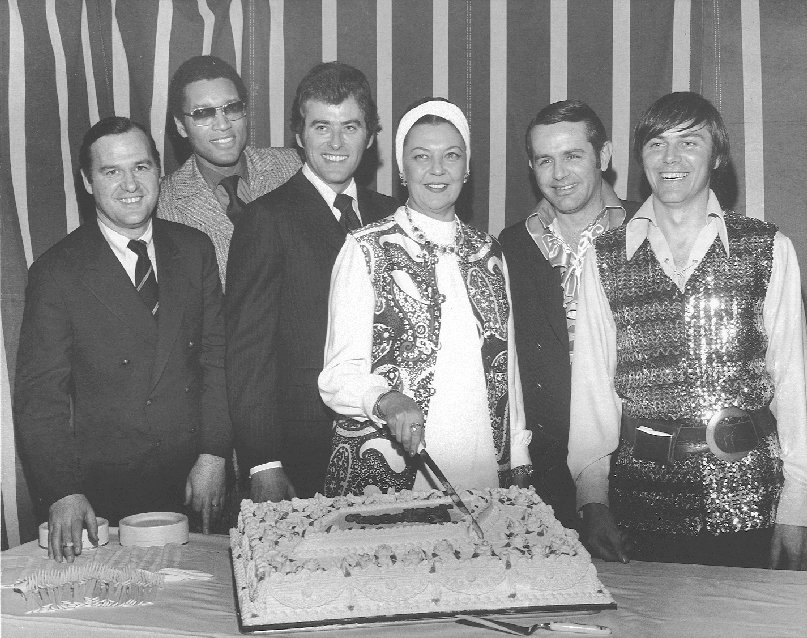
Opening celebration in Los Angeles, December 4, 1969. Pictured L to R: Attorney Tom Butler, producer Tom Wilson, investors Ben Johnson and Ancky Johnson (cutting cake), founders Chris Stone and Gary Kellgren.

Seeing the early success of the New York studio, Kellgren and Stone decided to move to the West Coast and open another one in Los Angeles. One of the first employees of the studio would be Chris' nephew, Mike D. Stone. To design the studio, they contracted with Tom Hidley who had built TTG Studios in 1965, and was becoming known in L.A. for answering the high-decibel needs of rock music. Hidley was brought on board as the "third musketeer", according to Stone. On December 4, 1969, the new studio opened its doors on 8456 West Third Street near La Cienega Boulevard. Sometimes known as "Record Plant West", the new studio held a 16-track recorder, larger than the 12-track system in New York (occasionally called "Record Plant East"), and studio time was 20 to 25 percent less expensive than typical studios in New York. Stone intended the Record Plant to stay innovative and retain the prestige of an industry leader, so in 1970 he installed a 24-track tape recorder. It was a very large machine assembled by Hidley at the cost of $42,000 but in the next three years it was used on only a few sessions.

Stone described the studios as being so accommodating that people would tend to hang out rather than leave. He said sometimes musicians would "come and live at the Record Plant for a while" because they could sleep, eat, drink, party and play music. Keith Moon and John Lennon were important enough clients to be given a gold key to the facility. Stone said, "They would come in at three in the morning and help themselves to a beer." If the musicians' antics wrecked any part of the studio—which "was a given" for Moon, according to Stone—they were not scolded or turned out; Stone said he simply charged the recording project an inflated fee for repairs.

Stone and Kellgren had profited enough to buy back their studio from Warner Communications, and at the same time expand northward with the Sausalito Music Factory, a Northern California location, the third and final Record Plant studio. As well, the duo widened their scope with more remote recording dates in 1973 including performances by Alice Cooper, Vikki Carr, Sly Stone, Todd Rundgren, Joe Walsh and Rod Stewart.

In July 1977, Kellgren drowned in the swimming pool at his Hollywood home. Guitarist Ronnie Wood wrote that Kellgren was probably electrocuted while trying to fix some underwater speakers in his pool, but the cause of death remains uncertain. The loss of his friend and business partner hit Stone hard. Stone was suddenly responsible for keeping all three studios operating, but he concentrated his attention on Los Angeles. He slowly began to lose interest in the Sausalito location.

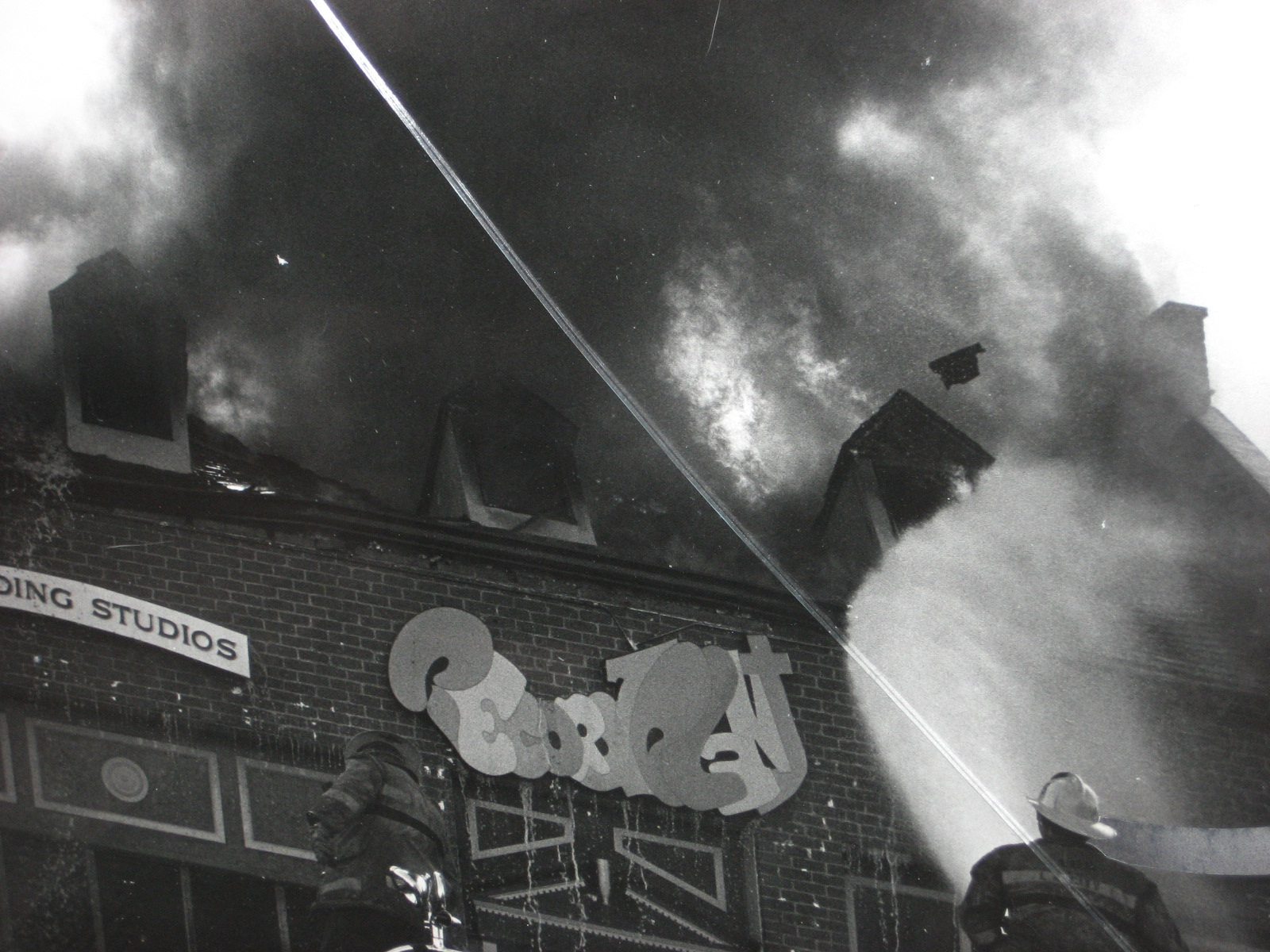
Studio C was destroyed by fire in January 1978

Studio C was destroyed in an electrical fire on January 10, 1978. Stone took the setback as an opportunity to update the equipment. During the next 13 months, Studio C was rebuilt and fitted with radical new gear. In February 1979, Stephen Stills became the first major-label American artist to record on digital recording and mastering equipment, a 3M system installed to replace the previous analog system.

The L.A. operation expanded further in the early 1980s, equipping two more remote recording trucks. The three trucks held consoles made by Automated Processes, Inc. (API).

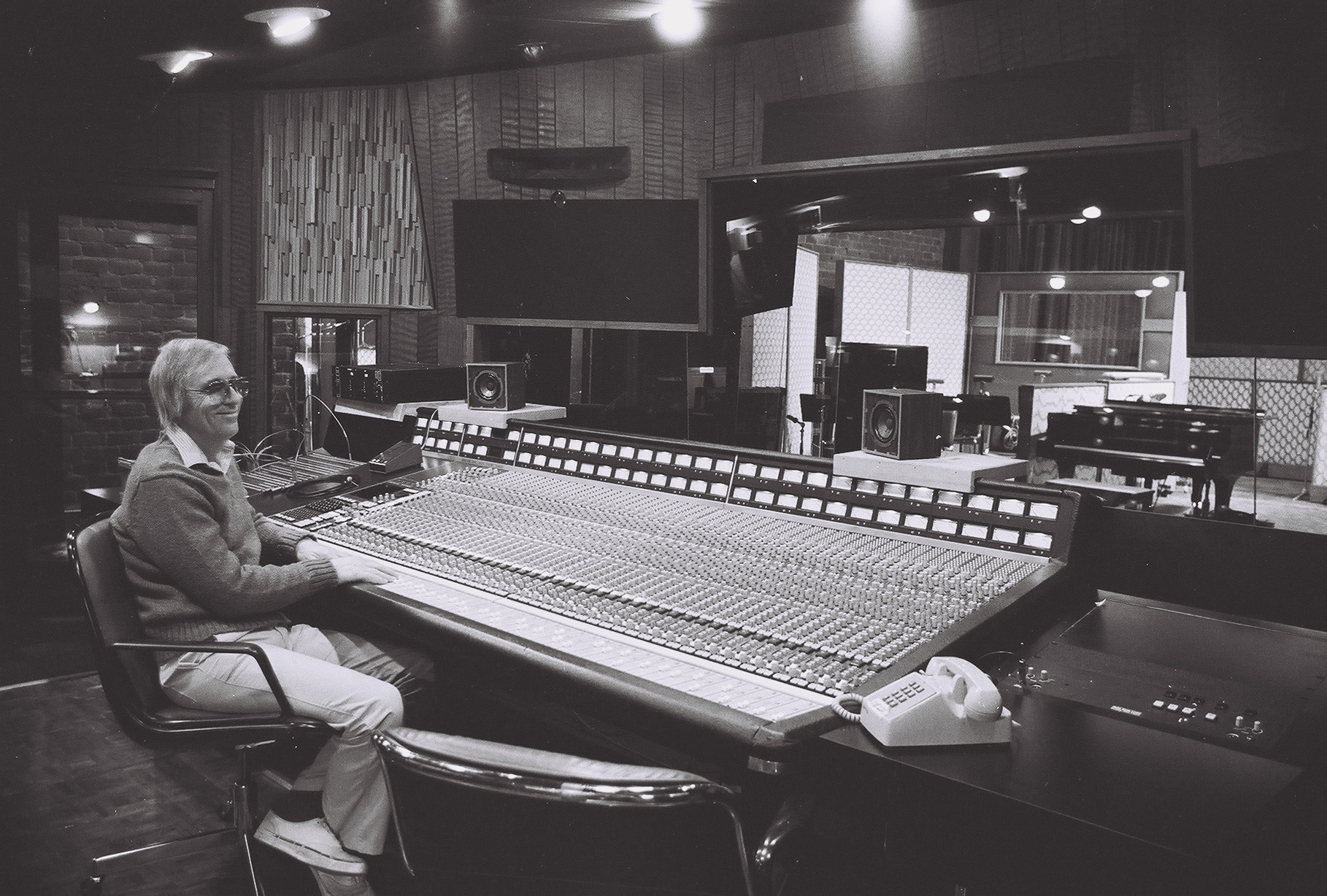
Dan Wallin at the Solid State Logic desk, Studio C, Record Plant, Third Street

In 1982, Stone leased sound stages M and L at the Paramount Pictures studio lot, for film sound recordings. Veteran film scoring engineer Dan Wallin assisted Stone in the redesign of the studios and the selection of equipment, including Solid State Logic (SSL) consoles and Hidley studio monitors based on JBL components. Soundtracks that the Record Plant tracked and mixed there include ones forFlashdance, Star Trek II: The Wrath of Khan, Annie, 48 Hrs., and An Officer and a Gentleman. Wallin and Stone gave recording industry talks at the Paramount's Scoring Studio M in September 1982, describing how the recording business should expand into motion pictures to counteract flagging profit margins. Stone said that, in order to be recognized by the film worker unions, he formed a separate business entity called Record Plant Scoring, and hired a separate crew of union engineers.

In 1985 as part of a planned expansion, the Record Plant's Third Street facility closed with hundreds of its customers and staff taking part in "The Last Jam". In January 1986 the Record Plant reopened at 1032 North Sycamore Avenue in Hollywood in the former Radio Recorders "Annex", a historic studio where Elvis Presley and Louis Armstrong recorded.

On December 8, 1987, Stone sold 50% plus one share of the Los Angeles studio to Chrysalis Records under Sir George Martin, with Stone continuing to manage the facility. In 1989 he sold the remainder and left it under Chrysalis management.

== Later career ==
Stone founded Audio Intervisual Design (AID) in 1984 and brought on ex-Sony Pro Audio executive Rick Plushner and Jim Pace to operate the pro audio sales company with the purpose of integrating traditional recording studio audio-only skills with visual media such as television and film. Plushner told reporters that the "next frontier" in audio is digital film sound. Stone said that the Record Plant was not going to abandon its roots in audio-only recordings. By 1986, Jim Pace and Jeff Evans purchased the company from Stone and operated out of the Record Plant facilities unit 1992, continuing currently in West Hollywood.

In 1987, Stone established Filmsonix, a consulting firm for the recording studio industry. Filmsonix provided consulting services to hardware manufacturers, recording studios and record labels.

In 1992 Stone founded the World Studio Group (WSG) for the purpose of bringing together major recording studios around the world in order to provide premium recording services to major groups while on tour. World Studio Group was chosen by Larry Hamby of A&M Records who proposed Stone's involvement with Woodstock '94. Stone arranged for four remote recording trucks, two for each stage, at Woodstock '94, as a safety backup in case something went wrong. Bearsville Studios would serve as the hub of recording. Bob Clearmountain was chosen as chief audio engineer to tie the four parts together, and to mix the resulting album. Stone arranged to have a tour bus parked between the two stages for as many as 12 audio engineers to sleep. After Peter Gabriel's concluding set ended in the wee hours of Monday, August 15, 1994, Stone's plan was carried out: all of the performances were digitally copied and backed up in the next two days. Not one song was lost.

Stone's WSG also provided audio recording oversight to the Rolling Stones on their 1997–1998 Bridges to Babylon Tour through South America and Europe.

In January 2016, Stone and Kellgren were inducted into the TEC Awards Hall of Fame at the NAMM Show, honoring their co-founding of the Record Plant. Also inducted was Jeff "Skunk" Baxter of Steely Dan and the Doobie Brothers. Stone died at the age of 81 on September 10, 2016, of a heart attack and stroke.
