= Alain Dister =

French writer and photographer

- Born: 25 December 1941; Lyon, France
- Died: 2 July 2008 (aged 66); Paris, France
- Occupations: Journalist, photographer, writer
- Writing career
- Years active: 1962-2008
- Genres: Rock and Roll, Punk Music, Beat Literature
- Website: alaindister.com

Alain Dister (25 December 1941 – 2 July 2008) was a French journalist, writer and photographer. He wrote numerous works on the subjects of Rock music, the 1960s, and the Beat literary movement in the United States.

Dister worked for the French magazines Rock & Folk and Connaissance des arts. He was a chronicler of the emerging Rock scene in America who wrote articles and books, and published photographs of musicians and groups such as Jimi Hendrix, The Beatles, Frank Zappa, Pink Floyd, Led Zeppelin, The Cure, Johnny Hallyday, and Grateful Dead.

== Career ==
Alain Dister was born in Lyon on 25 December 1941. He was among the first European photographers to join the Haight Ashbury scene in San Francisco in the mid-1960s (sexual liberation, drugs, psychedelic music, etc.) and chronicled the Summer of Love. He lived with key Beat Generation authors and artists, including Allen Ginsberg and Gregory Corso, the subject of his book La Beat Generation: La révolution hallucinée (1997). In Oh, hippie days! (2001), he wrote about the American counter-culture at the end of the 1960s. Maintaining an interest in popular culture, he followed the emerging Punk scene in Japan in the 1990s.

As a photographer, Dister was best known for his photographs of the world of Rock and Roll in the United States in the 1960s. In the summer of 1966, he lived in New York for a while and was a regular at the Café Wha? when Jimi Hendrix was playing there with his band, Jimmy James and the Blue Flames. After publishing his first article in issue #4 of Rock & Folk, Dister was sent to London in February 1967 by the head of Atlantic Records' French subsidiary, to interview Hendrix and take photographs. When Hendrix traveled to Paris the following month to promote his first singles, Barclay Records appointed Dister to act as facilitator and take photographs, which would later feature on the covers of the French & Benelux releases of "Hey Joe" / "Stone Free", "The Wind Cries Mary" / "Highway Chile", and the album Electric Ladyland.

Dister's photographic work has been exhibited in various museums and galleries around the world. He was a promoter of French culture and an art critic for the journal Connaissance des arts. His view of the attitudes and aesthetics of Rock, of Punk, and of other genres ignored by academics (especially in France) made him a witness of the counter-culture in America.

He resided and worked in Paris and Burgundy, and died after a long illness on 2 July 2008.

== Exhibitions ==
- 1973 : Séquences et Conséquences, musée d'art moderne, Paris, France
- 1983 : La Ville en ses jardins, CNAC G. Pompidou, Paris, France
- 1986 : Soirée Des stars sur la passerelle et Rock et photo, Rencontres d'Arles.
- 1990 : Visions of the Road, Palais des Beaux Arts, Charleroi, Belgique
- 1991 : Franco Fontana Collezione, Museo d'Arte Moderna, Modène, Italie
- 1994 : La Jeune Fille dans la ville, Galerie du Jour/Agnès B, Paris, France
- 1997 : Rock'n'Roll Attitudes, Espace Photographique de la Ville, Paris, France
- 1998 : Macadam Blues, FNAC Étoile, Paris, France
- 1999 : Agnès b gallery Shibuya, Tokyo, Japon
- 1999 : AND's gallery, Osaka, Japon
- 2000 : Gracie Mansion Gallery, New York, États-Unis
- 2007 : FNAC Forum et FNAC Montparnasse
- 2010 : Les Rencontres d'Arles, France.
- 2013 : Portraits de rock, Aulnay-sous-Bois, France

== Bibliography ==
- Jimi Hendrix (in French). France: Rock Genius. Collection Histoire du Rock n°1. 1972.
- Les Beatles (in French). France: Editions 10/18. 2003 [First published 1972]. ISBN 978-2-2640-3567-7.
- Le rock anglais (in French). France: Albin Michel/Rock & Folk. 1973.
- Frank Zappa et Les Mothers of Invention (in French). France: Albin Michel. 1975. ISBN 978-2-2260-0196-2.
- Pop et rock et colegram. (Les Albums Fluide glacial) (in French). With Jean Solé & Gotlib. France: Éditions AUDIE. 1978.
- Le Livre du Pink Floyd (in French). France: Albin Michel. 1978. ISBN 978-2-2260-0622-6.
- Led Zeppelin: une illustration du Heavy Métal (in French). France: Albin Michel. 1980. ISBN 978-2-2260-0793-3.
- Jazz et photographie: Exposition, ARC (in French). France: Musée d'Art Moderne de la Ville de ParisAlbin Michel. 1983.
- The Cure: Les orphelins du romantisme (in French). France: Albin Michel. 1989. ISBN 978-2-2260-3723-7.
- L'Âge du rock. (Découvertes Gallimard) (in French). France: Gallimard. 1992. ISBN 978-2-0705-3200-1.
- The Story of Rock: Smash Hits and Superstars. (New Horizons). London: Thames and Hudson Ltd. 1993. ISBN 978-0-500-30033-6.
- D'où viens-tu Johnny? (in French). France: Calmann-Lévy. 1993. ISBN 978-2-7021-2232-7.
- Vivre vite: Chroniques de la course automobile. (Découvertes Gallimard) (in French). France: Gallimard. 1995. ISBN 978-2-0705-3293-3.
- Ezy rider: En voyage avec Jimi Hendrix [Ezy rider: On the road with Jimi Hendrix] (in French). France: Seuil. 1995. ISBN 978-2-0202-2929-6.
- Cultures Rock (in French). France: Milan. 1996. ISBN 978-2-8411-3379-6.
- La Beat Generation: La révolution hallucinée. (Découvertes Gallimard) (in French). France: Gallimard. 1997. ISBN 978-2-0705-3420-3.
- It's Only Rock And Roll - Photographies (in French) (1st ed.). France: Marval. 1998. ISBN 978-2-8623-4034-0.
- Grateful Dead. (Castor music) (in French). France: Le Castor Astral. 2007 [First published 2004]. ISBN 978-2-8592-0729-8.
- Bagnoles, dragsters, autoroutes de l'enfer. (Minimum Rock'n'Roll) (in French). Vol. 2. France: Le Castor Astral. 2005. ISBN 978-2-8592-0607-9.
- Oh, hippie days! Carnets américains 1966-1969 (in French). France: J'ai Lu. 2006 [First published 2001]. ISBN 978-2-2903-4722-5.
- Couleurs 60s Colors (in French and English). France: Editions du Collectionneur. 2006. ISBN 978-2-8476-2014-6.
- Punk rockers ! (in French). France: Vade Retro. 2006. ISBN 978-2-8476-3028-2.
- Rock critic - Chroniques de rock & roll 1967-1987. (Castor music) (in French). France: Le Castor Astral. 2007. ISBN 978-2-8592-0722-9.
