= 1983... (A Merman I Should Turn to Be) =

1968 song by the Jimi Hendrix Experience

Song by the Jimi Hendrix Experience

from the album Electric Ladyland
- Released: October 16, 1968 (US); October 25, 1968 (UK)
- Recorded: March 13–June 10, 1968
- Studio: Record Plant, New York City
- Genre: Psychedelic rock; jazz fusion; psychedelic jazz
- Length: 13:25
- Label: Reprise (US); Track (UK)
- Songwriter: Jimi Hendrix
- Producer: Jimi Hendrix

"1983... (A Merman I Should Turn to Be)" is a song recorded in 1968 for the third studio album, Electric Ladyland, by the Jimi Hendrix Experience. Written and produced by Jimi Hendrix, the song features flute player Chris Wood of the band Traffic, and at over 13 minutes in duration is the second longest track released by the group (after "Voodoo Chile").

== Recording and production ==
Hendrix first recorded a private demo of "1983... (A Merman I Should Turn to Be)" in a New York apartment in March 1968, as a solo performance with guitar and vocals. In 1995, the demo recording was included on the companion disc of a book titled Voodoo Child: The Illustrated Legend of Jimi Hendrix. In 2018, it was included on the additional disc of the 50th Anniversary Edition of Electric Ladyland.

The first Experience recording of the song took place at New York's Sound Center Studios on March 13, 1968. On April 22, 1968, the backing track was completed at the Record Plant, with Hendrix, Mitch Mitchell on drums, and Chris Wood, then a member of Traffic, on flute. Additional overdubs were added on May 8, and the song was completed and mixed at the Record Plant on June 10. For the released version, Hendrix plays all guitars, vocals, percussion and bass (Noel Redding was absent from the track), with Mitchell on drums and Wood on flute.

The track features backwards guitar and flute parts, the sounds of seagulls produced by manipulating microphone feedback, and a flexatone that makes a ringing bell sound. By this time, Chas Chandler had stepped down as Hendrix's producer. Instead, production was led by Hendrix, while the engineering was handled by Eddie Kramer and studio owner Gary Kellgren.

== Composition and lyrics ==
In the book Jimi Hendrix: Electric Gypsy, Hendrix commentators Harry Shapiro and Caesar Glebbeek propose that "1983..." is "a song of firsts and lasts", describing the music as "Jimi's first piece of major orchestration, using the full capacities of the Record Plant's studio facilities", and contrasting the lyrical content as "the last of Jimi's surreal apocalypses; despairing of mankind, he finally returns to the sea, the source of all life". They also note that the song contains references to "Jimi's two favourite metaphors", sand and water, and that some of the phrases within the lyrics connote his "belief in the power of positive thinking apparent in his music, lyrics and interviews through all the rest of his life". In an interview with Jane De Mendelssohn for International Times in 1969, Hendrix explained the significance of the track to be "something to keep your mind off what's happening ... but not necessarily completely hiding away from it like some people do".

== Reception ==
In reviews of Electric Ladyland, "1983... (A Merman I Should Turn to Be)" has often been identified as a highlight of the album. Writing for the BBC in 2007, critic Chris Jones described the track as a "stoned classic", praising the way it "[utilises] washes of backwards tape, jazzy timeshifts and far out fish-friendly lyrics to tell the tale of future apocalypse and return to the oceans". English music magazine Uncut writer John Robinson characterized the track as a "brain-frying psychedelic epic", while Cub Koda of website AllMusic labels the track simply as "spacy".

American music magazine Rolling Stone treated the song slightly differently: Dedicating a paragraph of his 1968 review of Electric Ladyland to the track, writer Tony Glover summarised the lyrical content of the song before noting that "With tape loops, melancholy guitar and the flute of Chris Wood ... Hendrix structures a beautiful undersea mood – only to destroy it with some heavy-handed guitar. My first reaction was, why did he have to do that? Then I thought that he created a beautiful thing, but lost faith [in] it, and so destroyed it before anybody else could – in several ways, a bummer."

== Personnel ==
Musical personnel

- Jimi Hendrix – guitars, vocals, bass, percussion, production, mixing
- Mitch Mitchell – drums
- Chris Wood – flute

Additional personnel

- Eddie Kramer – engineering, mixing
- Gary Kellgren – engineering
