= All Along the Watchtower =

1967 song by Bob Dylan

- Picture sleeve from the Netherlands release (November 1968)

Single by Bob Dylan

from the album John Wesley Harding
- B-side: "I'll Be Your Baby Tonight"
- Released: November 22, 1968
- Recorded: November 6, 1967
- Studio: Columbia Studio A (Nashville, Tennessee)
- Genre: Folk rock
- Length: 2:30
- Label: Columbia
- Songwriter: Bob Dylan
- Producer: Bob Johnston

Bob Dylan singles chronology
"Drifter's Escape" (1968)	"All Along the Watchtower" (1968)	"I Threw It All Away" (1969)

Official audio
- "All Along the Watchtower" on YouTube

"All Along the Watchtower" is a song by American singer-songwriter Bob Dylan from his eighth studio album, John Wesley Harding (1967). The song was written by Dylan and produced by Bob Johnston. The song's lyrics, which in its original version contain twelve lines, feature a conversation between a joker and a thief. The song has been subject to various interpretations; some reviewers have noted that it echoes lines in the Book of Isaiah, Chapter 21, verses 5–9. Dylan has released several different live performances, and versions of the song are included on some of his subsequent greatest hits compilations.

Recorded by numerous performers, "All Along the Watchtower" is strongly identified with the interpretation Jimi Hendrix recorded with the Jimi Hendrix Experience for its third studio album, Electric Ladyland (1968). The Hendrix version, released six months after Dylan's original recording, became a Top 20 single in 1968, received a Grammy Hall of Fame award in 2001, and was ranked 48th in Rolling Stone magazine's 500 Greatest Songs of All Time in 2004 (40th in the 2021 version). Dylan first played the song live in concert on the Bob Dylan and the Band 1974 Tour, his first tour since 1966. His live performances have been influenced by Hendrix's cover, to the extent that they have been called covers of a cover. Dylan has performed the song live more than any of his others, with over 2,250 recitals.

== Bob Dylan original version ==
=== Background and recording ===
Following a motorcycle accident in July 1966, Dylan spent the next 18 months recuperating at his home in Woodstock and writing songs. According to Dylan biographer Clinton Heylin, all the songs for John Wesley Harding, Dylan's eighth studio album, were written and recorded during a six-week period at the end of 1967. With one child born in early 1966 and another in mid-1967, Dylan had settled into family life. Dylan has claimed that he thought of the song during a thunderstorm. He recorded "All Along the Watchtower" on November 6, 1967, at Columbia Studio A in Nashville, Tennessee, the same studio where he had completed Blonde on Blonde the previous year. Accompanying Dylan, who played acoustic guitar and harmonica, were two Nashville veterans from the Blonde on Blonde sessions: Charlie McCoy on bass guitar and Kenneth Buttrey on drums. The producer was Bob Johnston, who produced Dylan's two previous albums, Highway 61 Revisited in 1965 and Blonde on Blonde in 1966, and the sound engineer was Charlie Bragg.

The final version of "All Along the Watchtower" resulted from two different takes during the second of three John Wesley Harding sessions. The session opened with five takes of the song, the third and fifth of which were spliced to create the album track. According to Gray, as with most of the album's selections, the song is a dark, sparse work that stands in stark contrast with Dylan's previous recordings of the mid-1960s.

=== Composition and lyrical interpretation ===
'All Along the Watchtower'
Short sample of Dylan's vocals from "All Along the Watchtower". Author Michael J. Kramer wrote, "Danger, paranoia, ominous brooding, even death are present in the uneasy movement between minor and major chords and in Dylan's shrill vocals."

==== Music ====
Musicologist Wilfrid Mellers, noting the biblical references in "All Along the Watchtower", wrote that the song "heroically confronts, in grandly swinging Aeolian melody, deeply oscillating bass and thrusting rhythm, the chaos of fallen man". Mellers considered that the sense of threat expressed in the lyrics was "not exterior to the tune which remains, in its noble arches over its gravely descending bass, unruffled".

Musicology scholar Albin Zak finds a strong blues influence in the song which Dylan developed from his affinity for the blues of Robert Johnson and quotes Dylan's dedication in Writings and Drawings by Bob Dylan: "To the magnificent Woody Guthrie and Robert Johnson who sparked it off and to the great wondrous melodies spirit which covereth the oneness of us all." Zak sees "All Along the Watchtower" as showing a combination of the influences of Guthrie's ballad writing and Johnson's blues influences on Dylan. Zak compares Dylan's lyrics in the song directly to Johnson's "Me and the Devil Blues" (1938), stating that: "Dylan probes such fearful fatalism (of Johnson's lyrics) by grafting a narrative of alienation and apprehension onto a musical frame of implacable stability."

The music of the song has been described by Zak, who wrote, "The song's entire harmonic substance consists of three chords repeated in an unchanging cyclic pattern over the course of its three verses and instrumental interludes. The melodic pitch collection, shared by voice and harmonica, consists almost entirely of the pentatonic C#, E, F#, G#, B, though each part is restricted to a four-note subset. And the declamatory vocal melody gravitates throughout to one of two pitches." Zak then summarizes the entire song as: "The song's musical elements, extraordinarily delimited in number and function, combine to create an impression of unrelenting circularity, which accumulates, in turn, to impart a sense not of musical progression, but of a hovering atmosphere."

==== Lyrics ====
The original lyrics are in twelve lines, which the Financial Times writer Dan Einac commented, make it "akin to a truncated sonnet". The lyrics feature a conversation between a joker and a thief, whilst they ride towards a watchtower. Scholar Timothy Hampton comments that the pair are "overwhelmed by circumstances". Reviewers have pointed out that the lyrics in "All Along the Watchtower" echo lines in the Book of Isaiah, Chapter 21, verses 5–9:

Prepare the table, watch in the watchtower, eat, drink: arise ye princes, and prepare the shield./For thus hath the Lord said unto me, Go set a watchman, let him declare what he seeth./And he saw a chariot with a couple of horsemen, a chariot of asses, and a chariot of camels; and he hearkened diligently with much heed./...And, behold, here cometh a chariot of men, with a couple of horsemen. And he answered and said, Babylon is fallen, is fallen, and all the graven images of her gods he hath broken unto the ground.

Other writers such as Keith Negus have indicated that Dylan also drew on verses from the Book of Revelation to write the song. Elliot Wolfson found that Dylan's lyrics also reflected his own response to a melancholy reading of his own approach to Jewish gnosis. The general theme of justice is commented upon by Lisa O'Neill-Sanders, who states that Watchtower presents a "thief in the song... who consoles the victimized and exploited joker. The thief sympathizes but urges the joker to 'not talk falsely'".

Journalist David Stubbs interpreted the song as "obliquely allud[ing] to Bob Dylan's frustrations with his management and with CBS, whom he felt were offering him a royalty rate that was far from commensurate with his status". For Stubbs, the song "features a stand-off between the 'joker' and the 'thief', with the joker complaining of businessmen who drink his wine, feeding off him but refusing to give him his due". Authors Philippe Margotin and Jean-Michel Guesdon suggest that Dylan is the joker and his manager Albert Grossman is the thief. In The New York Times, Robert Palmer expressed his opinion that as artists like Dylan "were finding that serving as the conscience of a generation exacted a heavy toll. Mr. Dylan, for one, felt the pressures becoming unbearable, and wrote about his predicament in songs like 'All Along the Watchtower'". Hampton also wrote that the song can be viewed as an "allegory of the entertainment business, with artists exploited by managers". Commenting on the songs on John Wesley Harding in an interview published in the folk music magazine Sing Out! in October 1968, Dylan told John Cohen and Happy Traum:

I haven't fulfilled the balladeer's job. A balladeer can sit down and sing three songs for an hour and a half ... it can all unfold to you... (For example, as) with the third verse of "The Wicked Messenger", which opens it up, and then the time schedule takes a jump and soon the song becomes wider ... The same thing is true of the song "All Along the Watchtower", which opens up in a slightly different way, in a stranger way, for we have the cycle of events working in a rather reverse order.

The unusual structure of the narrative was remarked on by English literature scholar Christopher Ricks, who commented that "All Along the Watchtower" is an example of Dylan's audacity at manipulating chronological time, noting "at the conclusion of the last verse, it is as if the song bizarrely begins at last, and as if the myth began again". Heylin described Dylan's narrative technique in the song as setting the listener up for an epic ballad with the first two verses, but then, after a brief instrumental passage, the singer cuts "to the end of the song, leaving the listener to fill in his or her own (doom-laden) blanks". Hampton remarks on how the "already allegorical characters change into something else" from the first verse to the third verse, and compares this change in perspective to the way that some of the prose poems in Arthur Rimbaud's Illuminations change their framing.

Andy Gill commented that "In Dylan's version of the song, it's the barrenness of the scenario which grips, the high haunting harmonica and simple forward motion of the riff carrying understated implications of cataclysm; as subsequently recorded by Jimi Hendrix ... that cataclysm is rendered scarily palpable through the dervish whirls of guitar."

Dave Van Ronk, an early supporter and mentor of Dylan, made the following criticism:

That whole artistic mystique is one of the great traps of this business, because down that road lies unintelligibility. Dylan has a lot to answer for there, because after a while he discovered that he could get away with anything... So he could do something like 'All Along the Watchtower', which is simply a mistake from the title on down: a watchtower is not a road or a wall, and you can't go along it.

Songwriter Eric Bogle said he was envious of Dylan's ability to write a song that is open to several interpretations. Michael Gray wrote that, unlike on Blonde on Blonde, "Dylan's surrealism is stripped down to a chilly minimum on John Wesley Harding", and described Dylan's use of language in songs like "All Along the Watchtower" as "impressionism revisited ... reflecting wintertime in the psyche". In his 2021 book on Dylan, Larry Starr added that: "...'Watchtower' is a brief, compelling, and mysterious song. Its ominous character is captured memorably in the studio version, which utilizes for accompaniment just Dylan's guitar and harmonica... The singing is utterly straightforward, as if recounting a simple parable about the nameless joker and thief; Dylan is not about to disclose a hint of any deeper meaning...".

=== Release and reception ===
John Wesley Harding was released on December 27, 1967, less than two months after the recording sessions. Peter Johnson of the Los Angeles Times wrote that the track "brings out Dylan's talent for imagery", but felt the recording seems "fragmented and unfinished". It was regarded as the best track on the album by the reviewer for the Bucks Examiner. This sentiment was shared by Troy Irvine of The Arizona Republic, who felt that John Wesley Harding was better than any of Dylan's earlier albums.

Journalist Paul Williams regarded the song as "an extraordinarily successful interaction" between Dylan, McCoy, and Buttrey, featuring "some of the best cinematography in modern song-writing". In 2013, Jim Beviglia rated it as the 92nd-best of Dylan's songs, writing that Dylan "creates a stifling air of portent and tension with his three succinct verses". Author Nigel Williamson, in 2021, listed the song 31st in Dylan's oeuvre. In a 2020 article for The Guardian, Alexis Petridis ranked it the 28th-greatest of Dylan's songs, commenting that "there's a lot to be said for Dylan's humble original, its brevity and starkness capturing the same end-times intensity in a different way [to the Hendrix version]". The following year, The Guardian included the song on a list of "80 Bob Dylan songs everyone should know". Rapper Kanye West identified it as his "favorite song of all time" in a 2022 interview in which he also expressed a desire to work with and write with Dylan.

The track was released as the B-side to "Drifter's Escape" in Italy on March 1, 1968, and as an A-side, backed with "I'll Be Your Baby Tonight", in the Netherlands and Germany on November 22, 1968. In January 1969, the song was one of four John Wesley Harding songs included on an extended play release in Australia.

=== Personnel ===
- Bob Dylan - vocals, acoustic guitar, harmonica
- Charlie McCoy - bass guitar
- Kenneth A. Buttrey - drums

== The Jimi Hendrix Experience version ==
"All Along the Watchtower"
- European single picture sleeve

Single by the Jimi Hendrix Experience

from the album Electric Ladyland
- B-side: "Burning of the Midnight Lamp" (US); "Long Hot Summer Night" (UK)
- Released: September 2, 1968 (US); October 18, 1968 (UK)
- Recorded: January, June–August 1968
- Studio: Olympic, London; Record Plant, New York City
- Genre: Psychedelic rock
- Length: 4:01
- Label: Reprise (US); Track (UK)
- Songwriter: Bob Dylan
- Producer: Jimi Hendrix

Experience US singles chronology
"Up from the Skies" (1968)	"All Along the Watchtower" (1968)	"Crosstown Traffic" (1968)

Experience UK singles chronology
"Burning of the Midnight Lamp" (1967)	"All Along the Watchtower" (1968)	"Crosstown Traffic" (1968)

The Jimi Hendrix Experience began to record their version of Dylan's "All Along the Watchtower" on January 21, 1968, at Olympic Studios in London. Hendrix was musically attracted to Dylan's songs several times in his career, according to engineer Andy Johns. Hendrix had been given a reel-to-reel tape of Dylan's unreleased recordings at that point by publicist Michael Goldstein, who worked for Dylan's manager Grossman. "(Hendrix) came in with these Dylan tapes and we all heard them for the first time in the studio", recalled Johns. He initially intended to record "I Dreamed I Saw St. Augustine" but changed this to "All Along the Watchtower". Two years later he would also record "Drifter's Escape" from the John Wesley Harding album.

Stubbs writes that this was the second of Dylan's songs Hendrix had adapted to his own style, the first being "Like a Rolling Stone" played earlier at Monterey. A third song Hendrix adapted from Dylan is identified by Zak as "Can You Please Crawl Out Your Window".

=== Music ===
Dogget described the interpretation of the song: "Hendrix used the sound of the studio to evoke the storms and the sense of dread, creating an echoed aural landscape." For Zak, the Hendrix version of the song is more than a simple transposition of Dylan's harmonica riffs into Hendrix playing riffs on his electric guitar, involving adding a tonal quality of a "self-proclaimed 'Voodoo Child,' raging and defiant in the guise of a lead guitar." The layering Hendrix introduces in his version is further intensified and, "unlike the sonic reserve of Dylan's recording, here the frequency space teems with dynamic activity. From the highs of the cymbals and tambourines to the lows of the bass guitar and kick drum, the ongoing agitation of the frequency space heightens the track's sense of tumult."

Zak summarizes the Hendrix adaptation of the Dylan song in three main points, stating: "There are three basic strategies apparent in this transformation (of Dylan's version): (1) the intensification of essential musical gestures and formal divisions; (2) the introduction of pitch material dissonant with the pentatonic collection of the original; and (3) the tracing of a long-range, goal-directed melodic line over the call-and-response structure of the arrangement. It is in the latter that Hendrix asserts most forcefully his protagonist claim."

Although Zak has written of both the Dylan and the Hendrix versions of the song as influenced by blues players such as Robert Johnson, he has stated that the Hendrix version is much closer in its blues style to the songs and style of Muddy Waters, stating: "If Dylan's crying blues is reminiscent of Robert Johnson, Hendrix's shout calls to mind Muddy Waters and his 'deep tone with a heavy beat'."

=== Recording ===
According to Hendrix's regular engineer Eddie Kramer, the guitarist cut a large number of takes on the first day of recording in January in London, shouting chord changes at Dave Mason who featured at the session and played an additional 12-string guitar. Halfway through the session, bass player Noel Redding became dissatisfied with the proceedings and left. He later noted that he disliked the song and preferred Dylan's version. Mason then took over on bass. According to Kramer, the final bass part was played by Hendrix himself. Hendrix's friend and Rolling Stones multi-instrumentalist Brian Jones contributed the dry rattles featured in the intro, played on a vibraslap. This sparse version without any overdubs eventually appeared on the South Saturn Delta compilation released in 1997.

Kramer and Chas Chandler mixed the first version of "All Along the Watchtower" on January 26, 1968, but Hendrix was quickly dissatisfied with the result and went on re-recording and overdubbing guitar parts during June, July, and August at the Record Plant studio in New York City. Engineer Tony Bongiovi has described Hendrix becoming increasingly dissatisfied as the song progressed, overdubbing more and more guitar parts, moving the master tape from a four-track to a twelve-track to a sixteen-track machine. Bongiovi recalled, "Recording these new ideas meant he would have to erase something. In the weeks prior to the mixing, we had already recorded a number of overdubs, wiping track after track. [Hendrix] kept saying, 'I think I hear it a little bit differently.'" Apparently, Hendrix was trying to record what Zak has referred to in the song as a 'deep tone with a heavy beat' which was not highlighted in Dylan's version. By the end of the sessions, Kramer and Hendrix had 16 tracks to use for mixing the song that soon became the intended single of the album.

=== Credits ===
- Jimi Hendrix – lead vocals, lead guitar, slide guitar, six string acoustic guitar, bass guitar, producer, mixing
- Mitch Mitchell – drums
- Dave Mason – twelve string acoustic guitar
- Brian Jones – assorted percussion
- Eddie Kramer, Gary Kellgren – engineers, mixing

=== Release, charts, and certifications ===
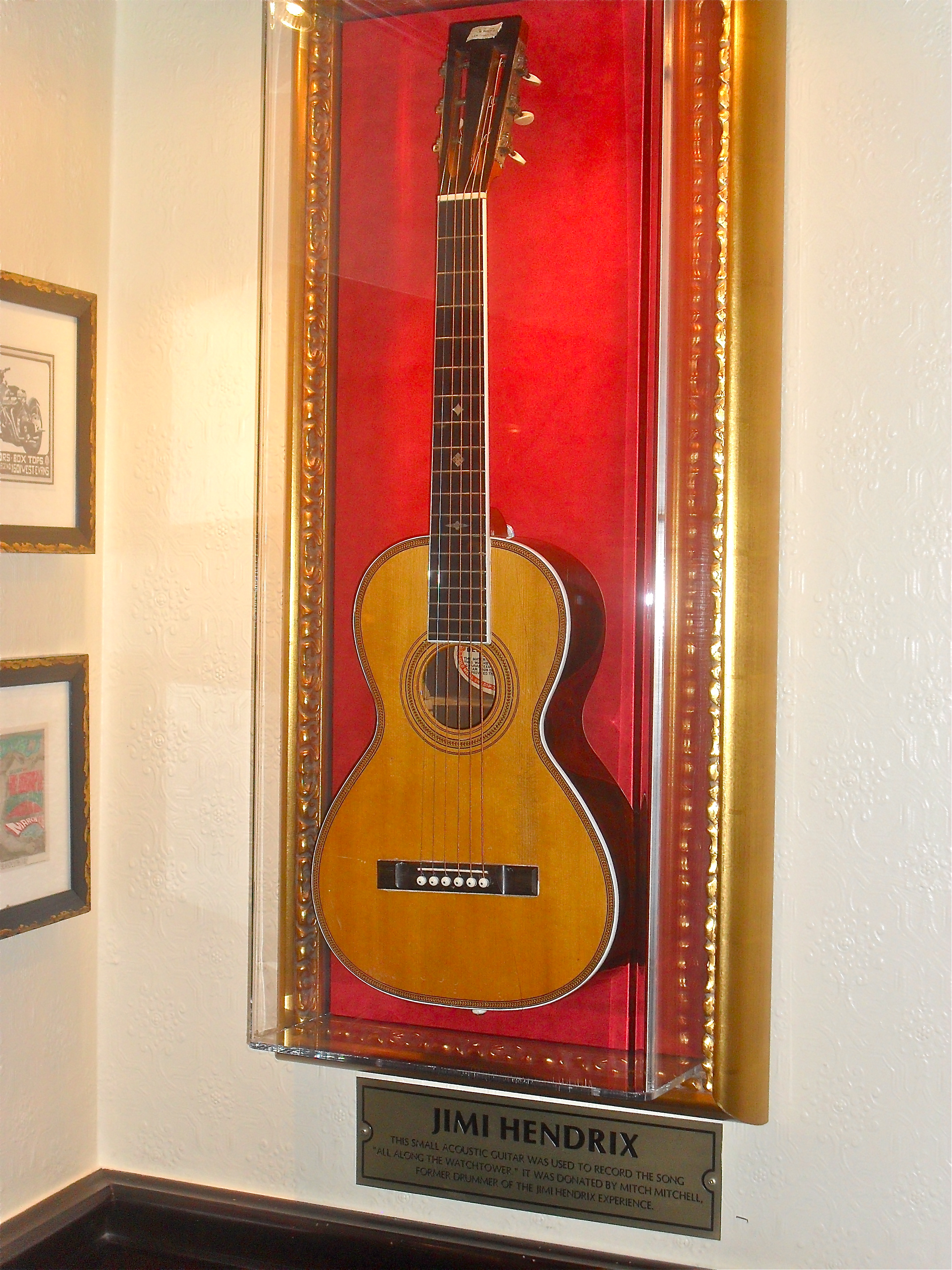
The acoustic guitar used to record Hendrix' version, Hard Rock Cafe, Amsterdam

In the US, Reprise Records issued the song as a single on September 2, 1968, with the B-side featuring "Burning of the Midnight Lamp", over a month prior to the album release on Electric Ladyland. Dylan gave it a glowing review in the Melody Maker magazine, which pleased Hendrix greatly. It reached number 20 on the US Billboard Hot 100 chart, Hendrix's highest ranking American single and only Top 40 hit to date. Track Records released the single on October 18 and it reached number five in the British charts, becoming the first UK stereo-only single to do so. Hendrix soon became reluctant about performing the song live, and after three months it disappeared from the setlist. One notable performance was at the Isle of Wight festival that appeared on the Blue Wild Angel live album in 2002.

Certifications and sales for "All Along the Watchtower"
Region	Certification	Certified units/sales
Denmark (IFPI Danmark)	Gold	45,000^{‡}
Germany (BVMI)	Gold	250,000^{‡}
Italy (FIMI) sales since 2009	Platinum	70,000^{‡}
United Kingdom (BPI) digital	Platinum	600,000^{‡}
^{‡} Sales+streaming figures based on certification alone.

=== Impact of the Hendrix recording on Dylan's performances ===
In 1995, Dylan described his reaction to hearing Hendrix's version: "It overwhelmed me, really. He had such talent, he could find things inside a song and vigorously develop them. He found things that other people wouldn't think of finding in there. He probably improved upon it by the spaces he was using. I took license with the song from his version, actually, and continue to do it to this day." In the booklet accompanying his 1985 Biograph album, Dylan said: "I liked Jimi Hendrix's record of this and ever since he died I've been doing it that way ... Strange how when I sing it, I always feel it's a tribute to him in some kind of way." In 1974, Dylan, with the Band, embarked on his first concert tour since his 1966 world tour. From the first show of the Bob Dylan and the Band 1974 Tour on January 3, 1974, in Chicago, the shows featured what Heylin described as a "Hendrixized" version of "All Along the Watchtower". From the first live performance, Dylan has consistently performed the song closer to Hendrix's version than to his own original recording.

The 1974 album Before the Flood, compiled from concert performances on the tour, included the song. Stubbs contended that through the "more heavy-duty arrangement of it on [the album]", Dylan "practically conceded that Hendrix made the song his own". Academics Janet Gezari and Charles Hartman wrote: "In effect, [Dylan] covered a cover of his own song". They opined that as Dylan's vocal range has narrowed and his delivery of lyrics became more brusque, listening to the song in concert, audience members "must either take it as a painfully constricted, even dismissive reference to the song the album gave us in 1967, or hear in it a compendium of all the history, Dylan's own and others', musical and other, between then and now, or as much of that history as we can know".

The live recording from Before the Flood appeared as the B side of "Most Likely You Go Your Way and I'll Go Mine" in 1974. The recordings came from separate concerts earlier that year at the Forum adjacent to Los Angeles, both with Dylan backed by the Band. In The Bob Dylan Encyclopedia, Gray noted that this is the most often performed of all of Dylan's songs. According to Dylan's own website, by November 2018 he had performed the song 2,268 times.

In recent years, Dylan has taken to singing the first verse again at the end of the song in live performances. As Gray notes in his Bob Dylan Encyclopedia:

"Dylan chooses to end in a way that at once reduces the song's apocalyptic impact and cranks up its emphasis on the artist's own centrality. Repeating the first stanza as the last means Dylan now ends with the words 'None of them along the line/Know what any of it is worth' (and this is sung with a prolonged, dark linger on that word 'worth')."

Scholar of English Sukanya Saha cites the original conclusion, "two riders were approaching, the wind began to howl" as an example of Dylan's talent for providing satisfying endings for songs. Saha goes on to say, "The end rhymes in his songs make his lines appealing as they reverberate in consciousness."

== Legacy ==
The original recording of "All Along the Watchtower" appears on several of Dylan's subsequently released "greatest hits" albums, as well as his two box set compilations, Biograph, released in 1985, and Dylan, released in 2007. In addition, Dylan has released live recordings of the song on the following albums: Before the Flood (recorded February 1974); Bob Dylan at Budokan (recorded March 1978); Dylan & The Dead (recorded July 1987); and MTV Unplugged (recorded November 1994). The track has been covered by dozens of artists, including Bobby Womack on Facts of Life (1973), XTC on White Music (1978), Billy Valentine for the Sons of Anarchy television show (2015), U2 on Rattle and Hum (1988) and the Dave Matthews Band. A dance music remix by Funkstar De Luxe was released in 2001.

Hendrix's recording of the song appears at number 40 on the 2021 Rolling Stone's 500 Greatest Songs of All Time (up from 48 in the 2004 version), and in 2000, British magazine Total Guitar named it top of the list of the greatest cover versions of all time. Hendrix's guitar solo was included at number five on Guitar World's list of the 100 Greatest Guitar Solos. His version of "All Along The Watchtower" was listed by Billboard in 2015 as one of the "Most Overplayed Songs in Movies". In 2021, American Songwriter ranked it number one on their list of his 10 greatest songs. It has been used in dozens of films, including Forrest Gump, Rush, Watchmen, and A Bronx Tale. The song itself was used as a major plot point in the Battlestar Galactica reboot. The song also features in the 2016 video game Mafia III.

In June 2026, CBS News included the song in its list of the 250 essential American songs of the past 250 years.

== Official releases on Bob Dylan albums ==
Versions of "All Along the Watchtower" have been included on the following official releases:

- John Wesley Harding (1967)
- Bob Dylan's Greatest Hits Volume II (1971)
- Before the Flood (1974)
- Bob Dylan at Budokan (1979)
- Biograph (1985)
- Dylan & The Dead (1988)
- The 30th Anniversary Concert Celebration (1993) – performed by Neil Young
- MTV Unplugged (1995)
- The Essential Bob Dylan (2000)
- The Best of Bob Dylan (2005)
- Dylan (2007)
- The Best of The Original Mono Recordings (2010)
- The Original Mono Recordings (2010)
- The 30th Anniversary Concert Celebration – Deluxe Edition (2014) – performed by Neil Young
- Bob Dylan – The Rolling Thunder Revue: The 1975 Live Recordings (2019)

== Official releases on Jimi Hendrix albums ==
Versions of "All Along the Watchtower" have been included on the following official releases:

- Electric Ladyland (Jimi Hendrix Experience, 1968)
- Smash Hits (Jimi Hendrix Experience, 1969)
- Isle of Wight (Jimi Hendrix, 1971)
- Stone Free (Jimi Hendrix, 1981)
- Kiss the Sky (Jimi Hendrix, 1984)
- Live & Unreleased: The Radio Show (Jimi Hendrix, 1989)
- South Saturn Delta (Jimi Hendrix, 1997)
- Blue Wild Angel: Live at the Isle of Wight (Jimi Hendrix, 2002)
- The Singles Collection (Jimi Hendrix, 2002)
- Fire: The Jimi Hendrix Collection (Jimi Hendrix, 2010)
- Freedom: Atlanta Pop Festival (Jimi Hendrix, 2015)

== Bibliography ==
Journal articles

- Gezari, Janet; Hartman, Charles (2010). "Dylan's Covers". Southwest Review. 95 (1/2): 152–166. JSTOR 43473044.
- Saha, Sukanya (2019). "Bob Dylan's Literary Merit: A Critique". IUP Journal of English Studies. 14 (4): 7–19.
- Zak, III, Albin J. (2004). "Bob Dylan and Jimi Hendrix: Juxtaposition and Transformation". Journal of the American Musicological Society. 57 (3): 599–644. doi:10.1525/jams.2004.57.3.599.

Books

- Beviglia, Jim (2013). Counting Down Bob Dylan: His 100 Finest Songs. Scarecrow Press. ISBN 978-0-8108-8824-1.
- Cott, Jonathan, ed. (2006). Dylan on Dylan: The Essential Interviews. Hodder & Stoughton. ISBN 978-0-340-92312-2.
- Gill, Andy (1999). Classic Bob Dylan: My Back Pages. Carlton. ISBN 978-1-85868-599-1.
- Gray, Michael (2004). Song and Dance Man III: The Art of Bob Dylan. London: Continuum International Publishing Group. ISBN 978-0-8264-6382-1.
- Gray, Michael (2008). The Bob Dylan Encyclopedia. Continuum International Publishing Group. ISBN 978-0-8264-6933-5.
- Hampton, Timothy (2020). Bob Dylan: How the Songs Work (Kindle ed.). Princeton: Princeton University Press. ISBN 978-1-942130-36-9.
- Heylin, Clinton (1995). Revolution in the Air - the Songs of Bob Dylan Vol.1 1957-73. Constable & Robinson. ISBN 978-1-84901-296-6.
- Heylin, Clinton (2003). Bob Dylan: Behind the Shades Revisited. Perennial Currents. ISBN 978-0-06-052569-9.
- Heylin, Clinton (2011). Behind the Shades: The 20th Anniversary Edition. London: Faber & Faber. ISBN 978-0-571-27240-2.
- Kramer, Michael J. (2013). The Republic of Rock: Music and Citizenship in the Sixties. New York: Oxford University Press. ISBN 978-0-19-538486-4.
- Leigh, Spencer (2020). Bob Dylan: Outlaw Blues. Carmarthen: McNidder & Grace. ISBN 978-0-85716-205-2.
- Margotin, Philippe; Guesdon, Jean-Michel (2015). Bob Dylan All the Songs: The Story Behind Every Track. Black Dog & Leventhal Publishers. ISBN 978-1-57912-985-9.
- McDermott, John; Kramer, Eddie; Cox, Billy (2009). Ultimate Hendrix. Backbeat Books. ISBN 978-0-87930-938-1.
- Mellers, Wilfrid (1985). A Darker Shade of Pale: A Backdrop to Bob Dylan. Oxford University Press. ISBN 0-571-13345-2.
- O'Neill-Sanders, Lisa (2021), "Justice", in Latham, Sean (ed.), The World of Bob Dylan, Cambridge University Press, pp. 282–283, ISBN 978-1-10849-951-4
- Ricks, Christopher (2003). Dylan's Visions of Sin. Penguin/Viking. ISBN 978-0-670-80133-6.
- Shapiro, Harry; Glebbeek, Cesar (1990). Jimi Hendrix: Electric Gypsy. St. Martin's Press. ISBN 978-0-312-05861-6.
- Sounes, Howard (2001). Down the Highway: The Life of Bob Dylan. Grove Press. ISBN 978-0-8021-1686-4.
- Stubbs, David (2003). Jimi Hendrix: Voodoo Child - The Stories Behind Every Song. Thunder's Mouth Press. ISBN 978-1-56025-537-6.
- Trager, Oliver (2004). Keys to the rain: the definitive Bob Dylan encyclopedia. Billboard Books. ISBN 978-0-8230-7974-2.
- Van Ronk, Dave (2013) [2005]. The Mayor of MacDougal Street : a memoir. Philadelphia: Da Capo Press. ISBN 978-0-306-82216-2.
- Williams, Paul (2004). Bob Dylan, Performing Artist: The Early Years (1960–1973). Omnibus Press. ISBN 978-1-84449-095-0.
- Williamson, Nigel (2021). Bob Dylan. Dead Straight Guides (5th ed.). Red Planet. ISBN 978-1-912733-41-5.
- Wolfson, Elliot (2021), "Judaism: Saturnine Melancholy and Dylan's Jewish Gnosis", in Latham, Sean (ed.), The World of Bob Dylan, Cambridge University Press, pp. 222–223, ISBN 978-1-10849-951-4
