= Burning of the Midnight Lamp =

- West German single picture sleeve

Single by the Jimi Hendrix Experience

from the album Smash Hits (UK Edition) and Electric Ladyland
- A-side: "All Along the Watchtower" (US)
- B-side: "The Stars That Play with Laughing Sam's Dice" (UK)
- Released: August 19, 1967 (UK); September 2, 1968 (US)
- Recorded: July 6–7, 1967
- Studio: Mayfair, New York City
- Genre: Psychedelic rock; psychedelic pop
- Length: 3:40
- Label: Track (UK); Reprise (US)
- Songwriter: Jimi Hendrix
- Producer: Chas Chandler

Experience UK singles chronology
"The Wind Cries Mary" (1967)	"Burning of the Midnight Lamp" (1967)	"All Along the Watchtower" (1968)

Experience US singles chronology
"Up from the Skies" (1968)	"Burning of the Midnight Lamp" (1968)	"Crosstown Traffic" (1968)

"Burning of the Midnight Lamp" is a song recorded by English-American rock trio the Jimi Hendrix Experience. Written by frontman Jimi Hendrix and produced by band manager Chas Chandler, it features R&B group Sweet Inspirations on backing vocals.

The song was released in August 1967 as the group's fourth single in the United Kingdom and later included on the 1968 British edition of their compilation, Smash Hits. In the United States, it first appeared as the B-side of "All Along the Watchtower". The song was added to both US and UK editions of Electric Ladyland (1968).

== Recording and production ==
Work on "Burning of the Midnight Lamp" began in May 1967, when the band recorded four demo takes of the skeletal song at London's Olympic Sound Studios during writing and recording sessions for Axis: Bold as Love. Progress was slow however, and this lack of success was said to leave Hendrix "frustrated and depressed" going into a string of European tour dates lasting for the next few months. Hendrix finished writing the song on a plane journey between tour dates in Los Angeles and New York City on July 3, and The Experience returned to work on the song at New York's Mayfair Studio on July 6, recording over 30 takes including the master recording. The following day the song was completed with overdubs – including backing vocals by R&B group Sweet Inspirations – and mixing, with the final mix produced on July 20. Production was led by Chas Chandler, and the song was engineered by Gary Kellgren.

== Composition and lyrics ==
Hendrix commentators Harry Shapiro and Caesar Glebbeek have described "Burning of the Midnight Lamp" as "introspective and melancholy", and quote Hendrix as offering the following insight into the inspiration behind the song:

"There are some very personal things in there. But I think everyone can understand the feeling when you're travelling that no matter what your address there is no place you can call home. The feeling of a man in a little old house in the middle of a desert where he is burning the midnight lamp ... you don't mean for things to be personal all the time, but it is."

Analysing this explanation further, Shapiro and Glebbeek propose the following:

"The house in the desert becomes a metaphor for Jimi's own suffocating frustration at failing to produce the song he wanted in the studio, failing to communicate or being a victim of failed understanding. The time for reflection on the plane leads Jimi to consider the downside of being the electric gypsy: the circus comes to town and moves on leaving no trace that it had ever been there – no roots, no home, no love. But Jimi keeps his own flame of love – ultimately the lamp is a beacon. Jimi calls out to anyone who cares to listen."

Speaking about the musical content of the song, Shapiro and Glebbeek note that "Burning of the Midnight Lamp" features Hendrix playing a harpsichord in the intro, which the musician states "just came to [him]", joking that he "can't play no piano or harpsichord, [he] just picked out different little notes and started from there". The track also marks Hendrix's first use of the wah-wah effect on his guitar recording, described by the Jimi Hendrix: Electric Gypsy authors as "a sound forever associated with Jimi Hendrix."

== Release and reception ==
In preparation for the release of "Burning of the Midnight Lamp", The Jimi Hendrix Experience played the song on a number of television and radio shows in mid-1967. On August 24 the band performed the track (live vocals over the studio backing track) at the BBC's Lime Grove Studios in London for TV show Top of the Pops; on September 5 they played the track at a studio in Stockholm for Swedish radio station Radiohuset (released in 1991 on Stages and in 2000 on The Jimi Hendrix Experience box set); and on October 6 the song was recorded at the Playhouse Theatre for radio show Top Gear, broadcast on BBC Radio 1 a week later (released in 1988 on Radio One and in 1998 on BBC Sessions).

"Burning of the Midnight Lamp" was released as a single in the UK by Track Records on August 19, 1967, backed with the specially-recorded B-side "The Stars That Play with Laughing Sam's Dice"; the single was also released in certain regions of Europe by Polydor Records. The release entered the UK Singles Chart on September 2 at number 32, spent nine weeks in the chart, and achieved a peak position of number 18 (lower than all three singles released previously). In Germany the single peaked at number 27 during a five-week stay on the Media Control Charts, and on the MegaCharts in Netherlands it charted at number 20 for two weeks. A four-track extended play (EP) was also released in Spain by Polydor including two tracks previously included on "Are You Experienced".

In September 1968, "Burning of the Midnight Lamp" was released in the US as the B-side of "All Along the Watchtower". It was also included on the Experience's third album Electric Ladyland, released in October 1968. It is one of only three songs on the album to have been produced by former band manager Chas Chandler, the others being "Crosstown Traffic" and "All Along the Watchtower". Writing for music website AllMusic, Matthew Greenwald proposed that the song is "one of Jimi Hendrix's more interesting records of his early career", praising the "wildly imaginative, psychedelic lyric" and the "striking" musical performance. In the AllMusic review of the album, writer Cub Koda also identified "Burning of the Midnight Lamp" as one of the highlights of the record, along with "Crosstown Traffic", "All Along the Watchtower", "1983... (A Merman I Should Turn to Be)" and "Voodoo Child (Slight Return)".

== Legacy ==
"Burning of the Midnight Lamp" has been recorded by several artists. The first commercially released cover of the song was recorded by psychedelic soul group Rotary Connection for their fourth album Songs, a cover album released in 1969 while Hendrix was still alive. Over 20 years later alternative metal band Living Colour released a cover of the song on their 1991 EP Biscuits, and subsequent renditions were released by the Hamsters in 1996, Roy Mette in 2001, Alexandre Da Costa in 2002 and Eric Clapton in 2004.

== Sources ==
- Geldeart, Gary; Rodham, Steve (2007), Jimi Hendrix: The Studio Log – 2008 edition, Warrington, Cheshire: Jimpress
- Shapiro, Harry; Glebbeek, Caesar (1995), Jimi Hendrix: Electric Gypsy, New York City, New York: St. Martin's Press
