= The Stars That Play with Laughing Sam's Dice =

Single by the Jimi Hendrix Experience

from the album Smash Hits
- A-side: "Burning of the Midnight Lamp"
- Released: August 19, 1967
- Recorded: July 19–20, 1967
- Studio: Mayfair, New York City
- Genre: Psychedelic rock
- Length: 4:10
- Label: Track
- Songwriter: Jimi Hendrix
- Producer: Chas Chandler

"The Stars That Play with Laughing Sam's Dice", also known as "STP with LSD", is a song by rock band the Jimi Hendrix Experience. It was released in 1967 as the B-side to their fourth single "Burning of the Midnight Lamp". Written by vocalist and guitarist Jimi Hendrix, the song was later included on the UK edition of the compilation album Smash Hits (1968) and the posthumous Loose Ends (1974) and South Saturn Delta (1997) compilations.

== Recording ==
Demos for "The Stars That Play..." were first recorded by the Experience at Houston Studios in Los Angeles, California, between June 28 and 30, 1967. Later in New York City, the basic track was recorded on July 19, with additional overdubs and mixing on July 29. The track includes a largely unidentified group of people referred to as "the Milky Way Express" providing backing vocals, whistles and other sounds, which may include musician Frank Zappa. The song was also the first recording released by Hendrix to feature his subsequently characteristic wah-wah sound.

== Background and release ==
According to biographers Harry Shapiro and Ceasr Glebbeek, "...Laughing Sam's Dice" was "hardly commented upon at the time [of the release of "The Burning of the Midnight Lamp" single] – dismissed as a good-time joke with lots of guitar to fill up the B-side." Due to its title, it has been suggested in later years that the song is a reference to (and possibly even influenced by) the hallucinogenics STP ("Stars That Play") and LSD ("Laughing Sam's Dice"), which were associated with psychedelic music. Further on the background of the song, the following has been proposed:

Jimi [Hendrix] was developing into a seasoned traveller in the mental territories of psychedelic experience. No mind tourist he. Like so many others, from his use of mainly LSD flowed an interest in the occult science, I Ching, astrology, numerology and colour as sound. But like any traveller who knows the roads, Jimi also knew the potholes. He had tried to persuade Fay [Fayne Pidgeon, a former love interest of Hendrix] and her friends not to take as much [LSD] as he because they weren't used to it. The passenger on Jimi's joyride did not heed the warning about opening Aldous Huxley's Doors of Perception without due regard to the dangers of sensory overload – and he certainly didn't have his parachute.

"The Stars..." has also been compared to "Spanish Castle Magic" and "Have You Ever Been (To Electric Ladyland)", as a song which embodies a "magical mystery tour spirit." The song was originally released as the B-side to the "Burning of the Midnight Lamp" single in the UK and some areas of Europe on August 19, 1967 and reached number 18 on the UK Singles Chart. The song was later included on the international (non-North America) edition of the Smash Hits compilation released in April 1968, and posthumously on the 1974 Loose Ends and 1997 South Saturn Delta albums, and the expanded reissue version of the 2000 The Jimi Hendrix Experience box set.

== Sources ==
- Geldeart, Gary; Rodham, Steve (2007), Jimi Hendrix: The Studio Log, Warrington, Cheshire: Jimpress, ISBN 978-0-9527686-4-7
- Shapiro, Harry; Glebbeek, Caesar (1995), Jimi Hendrix: Electric Gypsy, New York City: St. Martin's Griffin, ISBN 978-0-312-13062-6
