= Smash Hits (The Jimi Hendrix Experience album) =

Greatest hits album by the Jimi Hendrix Experience
- Released: April 12, 1968 (UK); July 30, 1969 (US)
- Recorded: October 1966 – July 1967
- Genre: Rock
- Length: 44:31
- Labels: Polydor/Track (UK); Reprise (US)
- Producer: Chas Chandler

Jimi Hendrix UK chronology
Axis: Bold as Love (1967)	Smash Hits (1968)	Electric Ladyland (1968)

Jimi Hendrix US chronology
Electric Ladyland (1968)	Smash Hits (1969)	Band of Gypsys (1970)

Smash Hits is a compilation album by the Jimi Hendrix Experience. Track Records first issued it on April 12, 1968, in the UK and included all four of the group's singles (both A and B sides) released up to that time, plus four additional songs from the UK edition of Are You Experienced.

Reprise Records did not issue the album in the US until July 30, 1969, with some different tracks. It included two songs from Electric Ladyland and three tracks from the UK edition of Are You Experienced, which were previously unreleased in the US (including a stereo version of "Red House" from a different take than the original mono album version).

Smash Hits has been reissued several times on CD; however, it has been largely superseded by more recent and comprehensive compilations, such as Experience Hendrix: The Best of Jimi Hendrix (1997).

Neither the UK or US edition of Smash Hits contains any songs from Axis: Bold as Love.

== Critical reception ==
Professional ratings
Review scores
Source	Rating
AllMusic	4.5/5 stars
Rolling Stone	4/5 stars

In a review for AllMusic, Stephen Thomas Erlewine gave the album four and a half out of five stars. He notes "the main strength of Smash Hits is that it contains the best-known big-name songs in one place. Maybe not enough to make the collection essential, but still enough to make it a representative, accurate sampler".

Robert Christgau included the album in his "Basic Record Library" of 1950s and 1960s recordings, published in Christgau's Record Guide: Rock Albums of the Seventies (1981).

== Track listing ==
The running times are taken from the 1980 Polydor (Europe) and 1979 Reprise (US) reissues; the original Track Records and Reprise Records Smash Hits LPs did not include track lengths. Other releases may show different information. All tracks written by Jimi Hendrix, except where noted.

=== UK edition ===
Side one
No.	Title	Original release	Length
1.	"Purple Haze"	single (UK)	2:44
2.	"Fire"	Are You Experienced	2:35
3.	"The Wind Cries Mary"	single (UK)	3:21
4.	"Can You See Me"	Are You Experienced	2:33
5.	"51st Anniversary"	single (UK B-side)	3:18
6.	"Hey Joe" (Billy Roberts)	single (UK)	3:26

Side two
No.	Title	Original release	Length
1.	"Stone Free"	single (UK B-side)	3:39
2.	"The Stars That Play with Laughing Sam's Dice"	single (UK B-side)	4:22
3.	"Manic Depression"	Are You Experienced	3:36
4.	"Highway Chile"	single (UK B-side)	3:32
5.	"Burning of the Midnight Lamp"	single (UK)	3:38
6.	"Foxy Lady"	Are You Experienced	3:18

=== US edition ===
Side one
No.	Title	Original release	Length
1.	"Purple Haze"	single	2:46
2.	"Fire"	Are You Experienced	2:34
3.	"The Wind Cries Mary"	single	3:21
4.	"Can You See Me"	Are You Experienced (UK)	2:31
5.	"Hey Joe" (Billy Roberts)	single	3:23
6.	"All Along the Watchtower" (Bob Dylan)	single	4:01

Side two
No.	Title	Original release	Length
1.	"Stone Free"	single (UK B-side)	3:33
2.	"Crosstown Traffic"	Electric Ladyland	2:15
3.	"Manic Depression"	Are You Experienced	3:30
4.	"Remember"	Are You Experienced (UK)	2:47
5.	"Red House"	alternate recording; Are You Experienced (UK)	3:48
6.	"Foxey Lady"	Are You Experienced	3:15

1988 CD and CD+G bonus tracks
No.	Title	Length
13.	"51st Anniversary"	3:16
14.	"Highway Chile"	3:32

== Charts and certifications ==
Chart performance for Smash Hits
Chart (1968–1969)	Peak position
Canada RPM LP Chart	3
Germany Charts	19
Norway Charts	11
UK Official Charts	4
US Billboard 200	6
US Best Selling Soul LP's	22

The Recording Industry Association of America (RIAA) certified it as 2× Multi Platinum, and the British Phonographic Industry (BPI) certified it as Gold.

== Personnel ==
- Jimi Hendrix – vocals, guitar, piano, bass guitar, harpsichord
- Mitch Mitchell – drums, backing vocals
- Noel Redding – bass guitar, backing vocals
