= Gypsy Eyes =

Single by the Jimi Hendrix Experience

from the album Electric Ladyland
- A-side: "Crosstown Traffic"
- Released: November 18, 1968 (US); April 4, 1969 (UK)
- Recorded: May–August 1968
- Studio: Record Plant, New York City
- Genre: Psychedelic rock; blues rock
- Length: 3:42
- Label: Reprise (US); Track (UK)
- Songwriter(s): Jimi Hendrix
- Producer(s): Jimi Hendrix

"Gypsy Eyes" or "Gipsy Eyes" is a song written by Jimi Hendrix and performed by the Jimi Hendrix Experience for the 1968 album Electric Ladyland. Subsequently, it was released as the B-side of the "Crosstown Traffic" single, which reached number 52 on the US Billboard Hot 100 and number 37 on the UK Official Singles Chart.

== Style and composition ==
In a review for AllMusic, Matthew Greenwald calls it "a great slice of blues/psychedelia". He adds:

"Gypsy Eyes" is based on a standard, ancient blues field holler, with Jimi Hendrix creating some great synergy between his vocal and the lead guitar riff. In fact, the song is loaded with a collection of riffs, and Hendrix neatly compiles them together in one song. Utilizing the recording studio as an instrument, Hendrix's overdubbing technique reaches an early peak here, as the multiple guitar parts swirl around each other in spectacular fashion. In addition, the flanging/phasing effects are also a part of the arrangement, and by proxy the song itself.

Richard Middleton notes that licks in rock music are often used through a formula and variations technique and that "Gypsy Eyes" "is put together from variants of five stock ideas...familiar from other recordings in the same style."

1. "Drum lick A"
2. "Drum lick B"
3. "A complex of riffs on guitar and bass guitar"
4. "A basic melodic falling pattern, using the notes of the pentatonic scale"
5. "A characteristic guitar effect, the attacked single note with long decay and glissando fall"

He concludes that "the combination and variations of these formulae are many and highly imaginative. But the basic formulae are so simple that the recording could well have been worked out 'in performance.'"
