= Voodoo Chile =

Song by the Jimi Hendrix Experience

from the album Electric Ladyland
- Released: October 16, 1968
- Recorded: May 2, 1968 (Note: Experience Hendrix's Encyclopedia entry and McDermott, Kramer, and Cox list the recording session under "May 2, 1968"; Shapiro and Glebbeek use "01 or 02/05/1968" (they list "03/05/68" for "Slight Return", which was recorded the next day).)
- Studio: Record Plant, New York City
- Genre: Acid rock; blues rock; jam band; proto-metal
- Length: 14:50
- Label: Reprise
- Songwriter: Jimi Hendrix
- Producer: Jimi Hendrix

"Voodoo Chile" (/tʃaɪl/ CHAIL) is a song written by Jimi Hendrix and recorded in 1968 for the third Jimi Hendrix Experience album, Electric Ladyland. It is based on the Muddy Waters blues song "Rollin' Stone", but with original lyrics and music. At 15 minutes, it is Hendrix's longest studio recording and features additional musicians in what has been described as a studio jam.

"Voodoo Chile" was recorded at the Record Plant in New York City, after a late night jam session with Hendrix Experience drummer Mitch Mitchell, organist Steve Winwood, and bassist Jack Casady. The song became the basis for "Voodoo Child (Slight Return)", recorded by the Experience the next day and one of Hendrix's best-known songs.

In the UK, "Voodoo Chile" was also used as the title of the 1970 single release of "Voodoo Child (Slight Return)", which has caused confusion regarding the two songs.

== Background and lyrics ==
"Voodoo Chile" evolved from "Catfish Blues", a song that Hendrix performed regularly during 1967 and early 1968. "Catfish Blues" was a homage to Muddy Waters, made up of a medley of verses based on Waters' songs, including "Rollin' Stone", "Still a Fool", and "Rollin' and Tumblin'". (Note: Muddy Waters' songs in turn were based on earlier Delta blues songs, including Robert Petway's "Catfish Blues", Tommy McClennan's "Deep Sea Blues", and Hambone Willie Newbern's "Roll and Tumble Blues".) In April 1968, Hendrix recorded a number of solo demos in a New York hotel, including an early "Voodoo Chile", (Note: A solo demo of "Voodoo Chile" was released with Voodoo Child: The Illustrated Legend of Jimi Hendrix.) which he had been developing for some time. It used elements of "Catfish Blues" with new lyrics by Hendrix and included a vocal and guitar unison line.

Music critic Charles Shaar Murray describes "Voodoo Chile" as "virtually a chronological guided tour of blues styles" ranging from early Delta blues, through the electric blues of Muddy Waters and John Lee Hooker, to the more sophisticated style of B. B. King, and the "cosmic blurt" of John Coltrane. Lyrically, he adds, the song is "part of a long, long line of supernatural brag songs". Hendrix's song opens with:

Well the night I was born, Lord I swear the moon turned a fire red (2×)
Well, my poor mother cried out, "Lord, the gypsy was right", an' I see'd her fell down right dead

"Hoochie Coochie Man", the Muddy Waters/Willie Dixon blues classic, opens:

The gypsy woman told my mother, before I was born
"You got a boy child comin', goin' be a son of a gun"

In later verses, Hendrix, a fan of science fiction, adds references to "the outskirts of infinity" and "Jupiter's sulfur mines". Music writer John Perry said of the concept behind the song that it "blends two of Jimi's great loves, Chicago blues and science fiction—interstellar hootchie kootchie."

The "chile" in the title and lyrics is a phonetical approximation of "child" pronounced without the "d", a spelling that was also used for Hendrix's song "Highway Chile".

== Recording and composition ==
During the Electric Ladyland recording sessions at the Record Plant, Hendrix and the band often jammed with other performers at New York City clubs. After one such jam at the nearby Scene club on May 2, 1968, Hendrix brought a group of about 20 people to the studio. This practice of inviting large groups to the studio led Noel Redding to storm out of the Record Plant earlier that evening and he was not present during the recording of "Voodoo Chile". Organist Steve Winwood from Traffic, bassist Jack Casady from Jefferson Airplane, and jazz guitarist Larry Coryell were among those present. Although Coryell was invited to play, he declined and Hendrix proceeded to record "Voodoo Chile" with Mitchell, Winwood, and Casady. The remainder were on hand to provide the ambient crowd noise.

Winwood recalled, "There were no chord sheets, no nothing. He [Hendrix] just started playing. It was a one-take job, with him singing and playing at the same time. He just had such mastery of the instrument and he knew what he was and knew his abilities". Despite the appearance of spontaneity, engineer Eddie Kramer said that such sessions were not informal. "Jimi plotted and planned out nearly all of them. He'd reason that if he had his songs together, if he really wanted to pull out what he heard in his head, he needed the right people ... and that's what he did". During the recording session, Hendrix is heard advising Winwood on his organ part.

Recording began about 7:30 am and three takes were recorded, according to biographer John McDermott and Kramer. During the first take, Hendrix showed the others the song while the recording equipment was adjusted. During the second take, Hendrix broke a string (these two takes were later edited together and released as "Voodoo Chile Blues" on the posthumous Hendrix compilation album Blues). The third take provided the master that was used on Electric Ladyland. Music writer John Perry claims there were at least six takes recorded, but several were incomplete.

"Voodoo Chile" opens with a series of hammer-on notes, similar to Albert Collins' intro to his "Collins Shuffle". Hendrix played through a Fender Bassman top, providing a "very warm" amp sound with his guitar tuned down a whole tone. Although Hendrix's vocal and guitar are featured, the other musicians make contributions, taking it beyond the blues. McDermott describes Winwood's mid-song organ part as "a very English, hornpipe-like dance that was very Traffic-like". However, Perry calls it a "modal, raga-like phrase", which Hendrix responds to by "improvising a mixed blues/eastern scale". Mitchell anticipates changes in direction and Casady provides a pulsing, solid foundation. At fifteen minutes, it is Hendrix's longest studio recording.

Hendrix wanted to create the atmosphere of an informal club jam, but the recording did not capture sufficient background noise. So the onlookers provided additional crowd sounds, which were recorded from 9:00 am to 9:45 am. Hendrix and Eddie Kramer later mixed the track, adding tape delay and other treatments.

Although many live recordings of "Voodoo Child (Slight Return)" have been issued, only the three takes of the original studio jam, "Voodoo Chile", are known to exist. A composite of the first two takes is included on the 1994 Blues album.

== "Voodoo Child (Slight Return)" ==
The day after recording "Voodoo Chile", Hendrix with Mitchell and Noel Redding returned to the studio for the filming of a short documentary. Rather than repeat what had been recorded the day before, they improvised on "Voodoo Chile", using some of the imagery and guitar lines. As Redding recalled: "We learned that song in the studio ... They had the cameras rolling on us as we played it". The song became "Voodoo Child (Slight Return)", one of Hendrix's signature songs, and has been covered by numerous artists. Both songs were released on the Electric Ladyland album.

== Confusion over title ==
Jimi Hendrix occasionally used different names and spellings for some of his songs. In his handwritten lyrics, he used "Voodoo Chile" for the longer song, while he used both "Voodoo Chile (Slight Return)" and "Voodoo Child (Slight Return)" for the following one recorded with the Experience. In his handwritten album notes for Electric Ladyland sent to his record company, he listed the songs as "Voodoo Chile" and "Voodoo Child (Slight Return)"; when the album was released in the US by Reprise Records on October 16, 1968, these spellings for the two songs were used. When the album was subsequently released by Track Records in the UK, the songs were listed as "Voodoo Chile" and "Voodoo Chile (Slight Return)". In 1970, the "(Slight Return)" song was released as a single in the UK and it was simply titled "Voodoo Chile", without the further designation. Later album reissues usually follow the Reprise or Track album spellings, depending on the country of origin.
