= Highway Chile =

Single by the Jimi Hendrix Experience

from the album Smash Hits (UK Edition)
- A-side: "The Wind Cries Mary"
- Released: May 5, 1967
- Recorded: April 3, 1967
- Studio: Olympic, London
- Genre: Blues rock
- Length: 3:32
- Label: Track
- Songwriter: Jimi Hendrix
- Producer: Chas Chandler

"Highway Chile" (/tʃaɪl/ CHAIL) is a song by the Jimi Hendrix Experience, issued as the B-side to their 1967 third British single "The Wind Cries Mary". The song was written by vocalist and guitarist Jimi Hendrix and titled to reflect his pronunciation of "child" without the "d" (a spelling subsequently used for "Voodoo Chile").

Biographers Harry Shapiro and Caesar Glebbeek describe it as "a joyful autobiographical stomp" about the pursuit of the American Dream. Matthew Greenwald of Allmusic feels that the song is autobiographical: "It's easy to see that Hendrix was writing about himself here, and his life as a musician on the road in the R&B/soul 'Chitlin' Circuit', and forming his own unique vision and style." He adds that musically, it is "A funky shuffle ... a great place for Hendrix's mid-tempo, R&B riffing, based on a blues pattern."

The song is also included on several Hendrix compilations, such as the UK edition of Smash Hits (1968), War Heroes (1972), and Experience Hendrix: The Best of Jimi Hendrix (1997). The single was mixed in monaural, while a true stereophonic version is included on The Jimi Hendrix Experience box set (2000).
