= Crosstown Traffic (song) =

- West German single picture sleeve

Single by the Jimi Hendrix Experience

from the album Electric Ladyland
- B-side: "Gypsy Eyes"
- Released: November 18, 1968 (US); April 4, 1969 (UK)
- Recorded: December 20–21, 1967
- Studio: Olympic, London
- Genre: Psychedelic rock, Blues rock, Hard rock
- Length: 2:18
- Label: Reprise (US); Track (UK)
- Songwriter: Jimi Hendrix
- Producer: Jimi Hendrix

Official audio
- "Crosstown Traffic " on YouTube

"Crosstown Traffic" is a song written by Jimi Hendrix and recorded by the Jimi Hendrix Experience for their third album, Electric Ladyland (1968). It was released as a single after "All Along the Watchtower", reaching number 52 on the US Billboard Hot 100 and number 37 on the UK Singles Chart.

== Background ==
This recording features the full line-up of the Experience with Hendrix on guitar and vocals, Noel Redding on bass guitar, and Mitch Mitchell on drums, in contrast to many other songs on the album which featured guest musicians. Hendrix also plays a makeshift kazoo made with a comb and tissue paper in tandem at points with his lead guitar, and backing vocals are performed by Redding along with Dave Mason.

With its hard rock riff, the song mixes elements of blues and acid rock. It is an early example of the psychedelic funk subgenre.

== Reception ==
Billboard described the single as a "pulsating swinger" that "will make a powerful chart dent." Cash Box described it as an "explosive session" with "massive instrumental impact and a heavy vocal." Record World said that "it shakes with excitement."
