= Electric Ladyland =

- Reprise Records cover

Studio album by the Jimi Hendrix Experience
- Released: October 16, 1968
- Recorded: July & December 1967; January & April–August 1968
- Studios: Olympic & Mayfair, London; Record Plant, New York City
- Genres: Psychedelic rock; acid rock; hard rock; blues rock; funk; psychedelic soul
- Length: 73:56
- Labels: Polydor / Track (UK); Reprise (US); Barclay (France); RTB (Yugoslavia)
- Producer: Jimi Hendrix (credited) (Note: Music critic and author Richie Unterberger writes: "The credit of the album's production to Hendrix did not sit well with Chas Chandler, who had been particularly vital to Hendrix's career, and had indeed produced some of the tracks". Hendrix also received a partial production credit on the US edition of the Experience's Smash Hits for "All Along the Watchtower".)

Jimi Hendrix US album chronology
Axis: Bold as Love (1967)	Electric Ladyland (1968)	Smash Hits (1969)

Jimi Hendrix UK album chronology
Smash Hits (1968)	Electric Ladyland (1968)	Band of Gypsys (1970)

Singles from Electric Ladyland
- 1. "All Along the Watchtower" Released: 1968 (Note: US single released on September 2, 1968: "All Along the Watchtower" with B-side "Burning of the Midnight Lamp"; UK single released on October 18, 1968 with B-side "Long Hot Summer Night"); 2. "Crosstown Traffic" Released: 1968 (US), 1969 (UK) (Note: US single released on November 18, 1968: "Crosstown Traffic" with B-side "Gypsy Eyes"; UK single released on April 4, 1969, with slightly different titles: "Cross Town Traffic" with B-side "Gipsy Eyes")

Electric Ladyland is the third and final studio album by the Jimi Hendrix Experience, released in October 1968. A double album, it was the only record from the Experience with production solely credited to Hendrix. The band's most commercially successful release and its only number one album, it was released by Reprise Records in the United States on October 16, 1968, and by Track Records in the UK nine days later. By mid-November, it had reached number 1 on the Billboard Top LPs chart, spending two weeks there. In the UK it peaked at number 6, where it spent 12 weeks on the British charts.

Electric Ladyland includes a cover of Bob Dylan's "All Along the Watchtower", which became the Experience's best-selling single, reaching number six in the UK and number 20 in the United States. Although the album confounded critics upon its release, it has since been viewed as one of Hendrix's best works and one of the greatest albums of all time, being featured on various "greatest albums" lists, including Q's 2003 list of the 100 greatest albums and various editions of Rolling Stone's list of the "500 Greatest Albums of All Time", on which it was ranked 53rd in the 2020 iteration.

== Recording and production ==
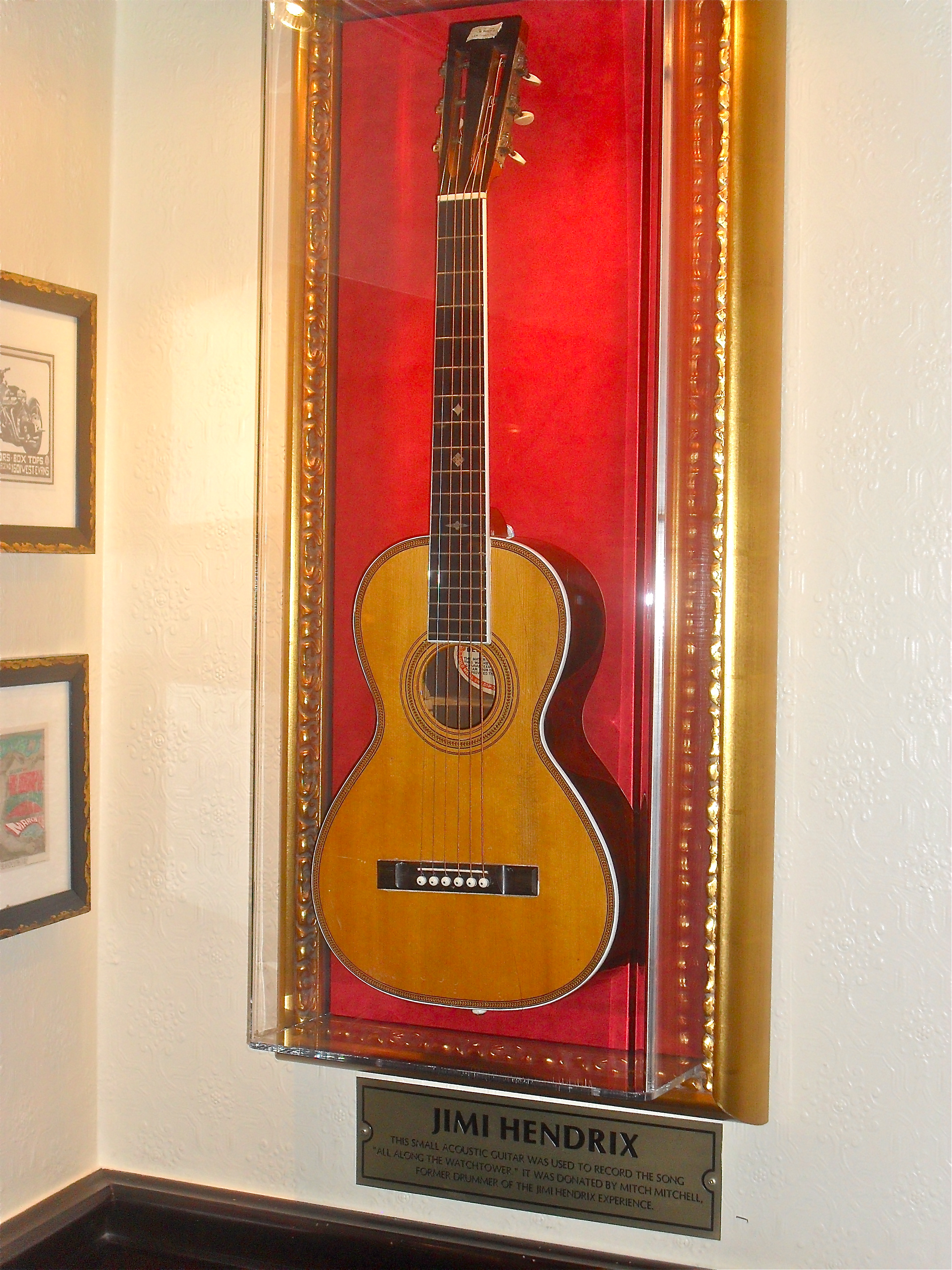
The acoustic guitar used on "All Along the Watchtower", Hard Rock Cafe, Amsterdam

The Experience began recording Electric Ladyland at several studios in the United States and UK between July 1967 and January 1968. Recording resumed on April 18, 1968, at the newly opened Record Plant Studios in New York City, with Chas Chandler as producer and engineers Eddie Kramer and Gary Kellgren.

Hendrix was famous for his studio perfectionism; he and drummer Mitch Mitchell recorded over 50 takes of "Gypsy Eyes" over three sessions. Hendrix was insecure about his voice and often recorded his vocals hidden behind studio screens. He sang backing vocals himself on the title track and on "Long Hot Summer Night". As recording progressed, Chandler became frustrated with Hendrix's perfectionism and his demands for repeated takes.

Hendrix allowed friends and guests to join them in the studio, which contributed to a chaotic and crowded environment in the control room and led Chandler to sever his professional relationship with Hendrix. Bassist Noel Redding recalled: "There were tons of people in the studio; you couldn't move. It was a party, not a session."

Redding, who had formed his own band in mid-1968, Fat Mattress, found it increasingly difficult to fulfill his commitments with the Experience, so Hendrix played many of the bass parts. The album's cover states that it was "produced and directed by Jimi Hendrix", which disturbed Chandler since he produced some of the songs. The double LP was the only Experience album mixed entirely in stereo.

Hendrix experimented with other combinations of musicians, including Jefferson Airplane's Jack Casady and Traffic's Steve Winwood, who played bass and organ, respectively, on the 15-minute slow-blues jam "Voodoo Chile". In March 1968, he was joined onstage at the Scene Club in New York by Jim Morrison of the Doors and in early April, Hendrix appeared at an impromptu jam with B.B. King, Al Kooper, and Elvin Bishop.

== Music ==
According to music critic Jim DeRogatis, Electric Ladyland is "a sprawling exploration of the studio as a place to create what [Hendrix] called 'sound paintings.'" According to music journalist David Stubbs, Electric Ladyland is "undoubtedly a rock album, albeit rock on the point of evolving into something else." Uncut magazine's John Robinson said that its music reconciles the psychedelic pop of Hendrix's earlier recordings with the aggressive funk he would explore on his 1970 album Band of Gypsys. During its recording, Kramer experimented with innovative studio techniques such as backmasking, chorus effect, echo, and flanging, which AllMusic's Cub Koda said recontextualized Hendrix's psychedelic and funk sounds on the album.

Electric Ladyland is a cross-section of Hendrix's wide range of musical talent. It includes examples of several genres and styles of music: the psychedelic "Burning of the Midnight Lamp", a UK single the previous summer (1967), the extended blues jam "Voodoo Chile", the New Orleans-style R&B of Earl King's "Come On", the epic studio production of "1983... (A Merman I Should Turn to Be)", the social commentary of "House Burning Down", and the sixties-era British pop of Noel Redding's "Little Miss Strange". The album also features an electric reworking of the Bob Dylan song "All Along the Watchtower", which has been highly acclaimed by critics as well as by Dylan himself, and also "Voodoo Child (Slight Return)", a staple of both radio and guitar repertoire. Rolling Stone's Holly George-Warren praised "Crosstown Traffic" for its hard rock guitar riff.

"All Along the Watchtower" became the band's top-selling single and their only US top 40 hit, peaking at number 20; it reached number five in the UK. The album also included one of Hendrix's most prominent uses of a wah-wah pedal, on "Burning of the Midnight Lamp", which reached number 18 in the UK charts.

== Cover ==
Hendrix had written to Reprise describing what he wanted for the cover art, but was largely ignored. He expressly asked for a color photo by Linda Eastman (later known as Linda McCartney following her marriage with Paul McCartney) of the group sitting with children on the sculpture of Alice in Wonderland in Central Park, and drew a picture of it for reference. The company instead used a blurred red and yellow photo of his head while performing at Saville Theatre, taken by Karl Ferris.

The outer record sleeve UK cover by the photographer David Montgomery and later Polydor reissue distributed in Europe

Track Records used its art department, which produced a cover image by photographer David Montgomery, who also shot the inside cover portrait of Hendrix, depicting nineteen nude women lounging in front of a black background. Hendrix expressed initial displeasure and surprise with this "naked lady" cover (but later told Rolling Stone magazine that he "dug it anyway"), much as he was displeased with the Axis: Bold as Love cover, which he found disrespectful. The cover was banned by several record dealers as "pornographic", while others sold it with the gatefold cover turned inside out, or in a brown wrapper.

This cover design later inspired the official video of the 1993 song "Sweet Harmony" produced by British band The Beloved, in which the lead singer Jon Marsh sang sitting nude, among a number of nude-posing women.

The front cover sleeve by Alain Dister for Barclay release

The album was also issued in two parts in the UK, with different cover art.

In France and the Benelux countries, Hendrix's recordings were released by Barclay Records, and Electric Ladyland featured a front cover photograph by Alain Dister, and inner sleeve photographs by Jean-Pierre Leloir and Donald Silverstein.

== Release and reception ==
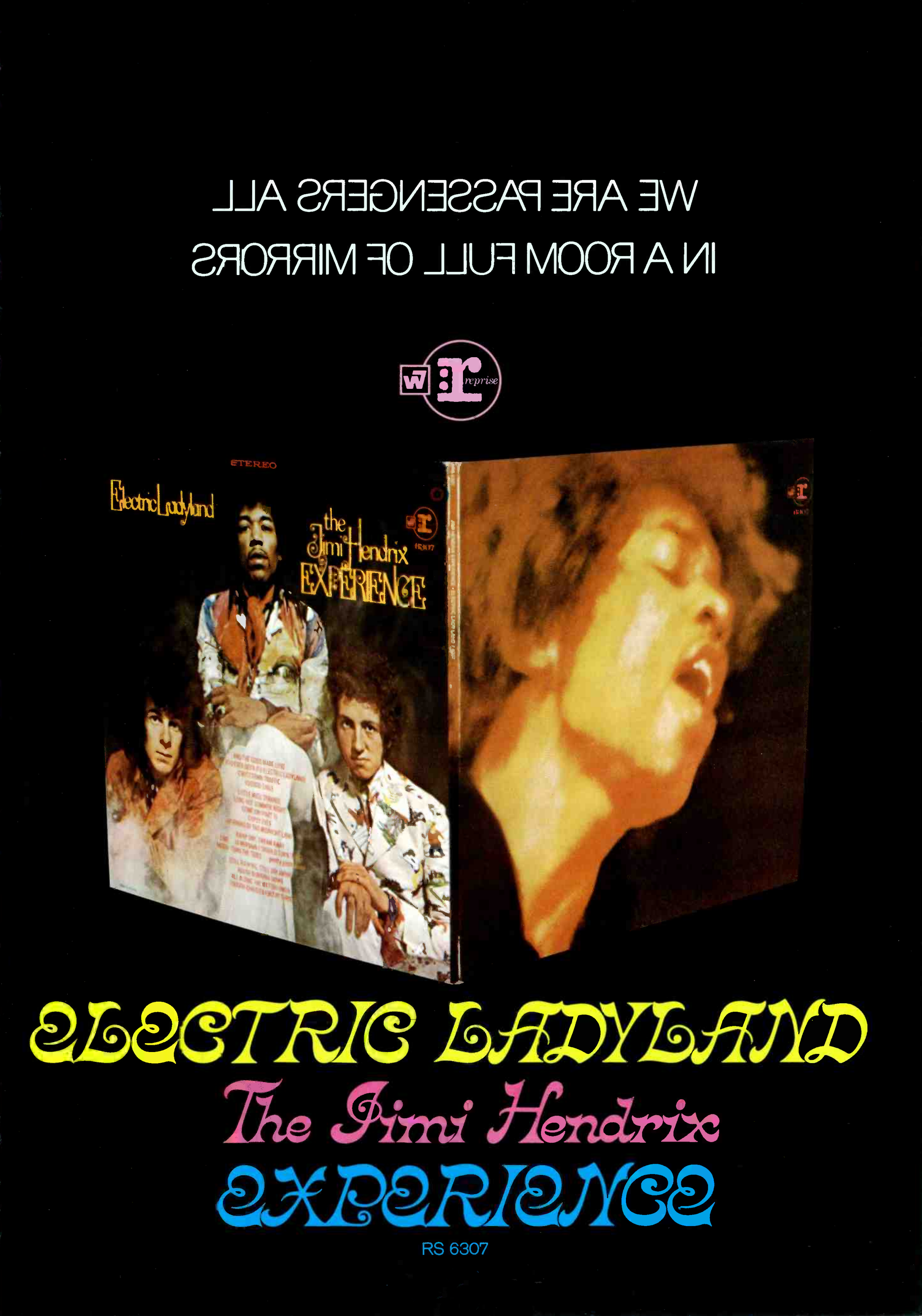
Cashbox advertisement, October 26, 1968

Electric Ladyland was released in the US on October 16, 1968. It was a "hit psychedelic album", Richie Unterberger later wrote, and by mid-November, it had reached number one in the US, spending two weeks atop the pop charts. The double LP was the Experience's most commercially successful release and Hendrix's only number-one album. In the UK, it peaked at number six and charted for 12 weeks.

Electric Ladyland confounded contemporary critics; reviewers praised some of its songs but felt the album lacked structure and sounded too dense. Melody Maker called it "mixed-up and muddled", with the exception of "All Along the Watchtower", which the magazine called a masterpiece. Reviewing for Rolling Stone in 1968, Tony Glover said Hendrix's original songs sometimes sound unstructured and was somewhat disappointed by the "heavy handed guitar" on "1983... (A Merman I Should Turn to Be)" and the science-fiction conclusion to "House Burning Down". Ultimately, Glover appreciated the "energy flow" unifying the songs and described Hendrix as "amazing", adding that Electric Ladyland serves as "an extended look into Hendrix's head, and mostly it seems to have some pretty good things in it (who among us is totally free of mental garbage?)". Robert Christgau was more enthusiastic in Stereo Review, regarding it as an explosive showcase of rock's "most important recent innovation"—the "heavy" guitar aesthetic—and "an integrated work-in-itself in more ways than one". He found the production exceptional—"the best job of stereo for its own sake I know"—and was surprisingly impressed by the quality of the lyrics. While most guitarists in rock believed improvisation to be a straightforward endeavor, Christgau said "Hendrix achieves unique effects, effects you'll never get from Kenny Burrell", citing "Voodoo Chile" as an example. He later named Electric Ladyland the fifth-best album of 1968 in his ballot for Jazz & Pop magazine's critics poll.

=== Reappraisal ===
The 2018 50th Anniversary Deluxe Edition received universal acclaim, earning a Metacritic score of 97 based on seven critic reviews. Record Collector called it "a fine celebration of Hendrix's most kaleidoscopically-realised endeavour", while other reviewers highlighted the restored original cover photo and the added early demos, outtakes, and 1968 Hollywood Bowl concert recording.

Professional ratings
Retrospective professional ratings
Aggregate scores
Source	Rating
Metacritic	97/100 (deluxe edition)
Review scores
Source	Rating
AllMusic	5/5 stars
Blender	5/5 stars
DownBeat	5/5 stars
The Encyclopedia of Popular Music	5/5 stars
The Great Rock Discography	10/10
PopMatters	10/10
Q	4/5 stars
The Rolling Stone Album Guide	5/5 stars
Uncut	5/5 stars

Over time, Electric Ladyland's critical standing improved significantly, with author and musicologist John Perry describing it as "one of the greatest double-albums in Rock." According to author Michael Heatley, "most critics agree" that the album was "the fullest realization of Jimi's far-reaching ambitions"; Guitar World editor Noe Goldwasser called it his greatest work. The record was also deemed an essential hard rock album in Tom Larson's 2004 book History of Rock and Roll, and Clash reviewer Robin Murray viewed it as a "true classic of the psychedelic rock era". In a retrospective review for Blender, Christgau wrote that it was the definitive work of psychedelic music, describing the record as "an aural utopia that accommodates both ingrained conflict and sweet, vague spiritual yearnings, held together by a master musician". In Charlotte Greig's opinion, much like Are You Experienced, Electric Ladyland was "groundbreaking, introducing audiences to a style of psychedelic rock rooted in the blues". The Washington Post critic Geoffrey Himes names it an exemplary release of the progressive soul development from 1968 to 1973. Author Amy Wallace called the album a "classic of acid rock."

Electric Ladyland has been featured on many greatest album lists, including a number 10 ranking on Classic Rock magazine's list of the 100 Greatest Rock Albums Ever, and number 37 on The Times' 100 Best Albums of All Time. Music journalist and author Peter Doggett argued that it is very likely the greatest rock album of all time because of its exceptional concept, artful melodies, experimentation, and skilled musicianship, which he felt remains unparalleled by any other rock artist. The album was included in "A Basic Record Library" of 1950s and 1960s recordings, published in Christgau's Record Guide: Rock Albums of the Seventies (1981). In 1999, it was inducted into the Grammy Hall of Fame, and in 2000, it was voted number 32 in Colin Larkin's All Time Top 1000 Albums. In 2003, Q magazine named Electric Ladyland as one of the 100 greatest albums. Rolling Stone ranked it 54th in the 2003 edition of its "500 Greatest Albums of All Time" publication and 53rd in the 2020 edition.

== Track listing ==
The original US Reprise and UK Track albums did not list running times for the songs. Track lengths are taken from the 1968 International Polydor Production album. Some of the song titles differ slightly between the original US and UK album editions and between the titles shown on the album back cover, the inside liner notes, and the labels on the records themselves; the titles listed here are those shown on the record labels. All songs are written by Jimi Hendrix, except where noted.

Original album

Side A
No.	Title	UK title (where different)	Length
1.	"... And the Gods Made Love"	"And the Gods Made Love" (no ellipsis)	1:19
2.	"Have You Ever Been (To Electric Ladyland)"		2:08
3.	"Crosstown Traffic"	"Cross Town Traffic"	2:25
4.	"Voodoo Chile"		14:50

Side B
No.	Title	UK title (where different)	Length
1.	"Little Miss Strange" (Noel Redding)		2:47
2.	"Long Hot Summer Night"		3:21
3.	"Come On (Part 1)" (Earl King)	"Come On"	4:04
4.	"Gypsy Eyes"	"Gipsy Eyes"	3:38
5.	"Burning of the Midnight Lamp"	"The Burning of the Midnight Lamp"	3:33

Side C
No.	Title	UK title (where different)	Length
1.	"Rainy Day, Dream Away"		3:39
2.	"1983....(A Merman I Should Turn to Be)"	Three ellipses instead of four	13:25
3.	"Moon, Turn the Tides....Gently Gently Away"	Three ellipses instead of four	0:58

Side D
No.	Title	UK title (where different)	Length
1.	"Still Raining, Still Dreaming"		4:19
2.	"House Burning Down"		4:26
3.	"All Along the Watchtower" (Bob Dylan)		3:54
4.	"Voodoo Child (Slight Return)"	"Voodoo Chile (Slight Return)"	5:06
Total length:			73:56

Cassette version

As was common with multi-LP albums, sides A and D were pressed back to back on the same platter, likewise sides B and C. This was called auto-coupling or automatic sequencing and was intended to make it easier to play through the entire album in sequence (A B C D) on automatic record changers. For the cassette version where everything was fitted onto one tape, album sides A & C were put together on side 1 with B & D on side 2.

Side A
No.	Title	UK title (where different)	Length
1.	"... And the Gods Made Love"	"And the Gods Made Love" (no ellipsis)	1:19
2.	"Have You Ever Been (To Electric Ladyland)"		2:08
3.	"Crosstown Traffic"	"Cross Town Traffic"	2:25
4.	"Voodoo Chile"		14:50

Side B
No.	Title	UK title (where different)	Length
1.	"Rainy Day, Dream Away"		3:39
2.	"1983... (A Merman I Should Turn to Be)"	Three ellipses instead of four	13:25
3.	"Moon, Turn the Tides....Gently Gently Away"	Three ellipses instead of four	0:58

Side C
No.	Title	UK title (where different)	Length
1.	"Little Miss Strange" (Noel Redding)		2:47
2.	"Long Hot Summer Night"		3:21
3.	"Come On (Part 1)" (Earl King)	"Come On"	4:04
4.	"Gypsy Eyes"	"Gipsy Eyes"	3:38
5.	"Burning of the Midnight Lamp"	"The Burning of the Midnight Lamp"	3:33

Side D
No.	Title	UK title (where different)	Length
1.	"Still Raining, Still Dreaming"		4:19
2.	"House Burning Down"		4:26
3.	"All Along the Watchtower" (Bob Dylan)		3:54
4.	"Voodoo Child (Slight Return)"	"Voodoo Chile (Slight Return)"	5:06
Total length:			73:56

=== Notes ===
- A new 50th anniversary edition was released on November 28, 2018. It features Hendrix's originally intended cover, and is available as a box-set with either a Blu-ray disc and 3-CDs or a Blu-ray disc and 6-LPs. The Blu-ray includes a 5.1 surround mix by Eddie Kramer and a high resolution version of the album remaster. The remastering was done by Bernie Grundman from the original master tapes. The box set also features early takes, demos and live concert from September 14, 1968, at the Hollywood Bowl plus a 1997 documentary "At Last...The Beginning: The Making of Electric Ladyland" featuring Chas Chandler, Mitch Mitchell, Noel Redding and Eddie Kramer.

== Personnel ==
Credits taken from the 1993 MCA compact disc liner notes.

The Jimi Hendrix Experience

- Jimi Hendrix – vocals, guitars, piano, percussion, electric harpsichord; bass guitar on "Have You Ever Been (To Electric Ladyland)", "Long Hot Summer Night", "Gypsy Eyes", "1983...", "House Burning Down", and "All Along the Watchtower"; comb and paper on "Crosstown Traffic"
- Noel Redding – bass guitar, backing vocals on "Crosstown Traffic", "Little Miss Strange", "Come On", "Burning of the Midnight Lamp", and "Voodoo Child (Slight Return)"; acoustic guitar and lead vocals on "Little Miss Strange"
- Mitch Mitchell – drums, percussion, backing vocals on all tracks except "Rainy Day, Dream Away" and "Still Raining, Still Dreaming"; lead vocals on "Little Miss Strange"

Additional musicians

- Al Kooper – piano on "Long Hot Summer Night"
- Dave Mason – twelve-string guitar on "All Along the Watchtower", backing vocals on "Crosstown Traffic"
- Steve Winwood – Hammond organ on "Voodoo Chile"
- Jack Casady – bass guitar on "Voodoo Chile"
- Freddie Smith – tenor saxophone on "Rainy Day, Dream Away" and "Still Raining, Still Dreaming"
- Mike Finnigan – organ on "Rainy Day, Dream Away" and "Still Raining, Still Dreaming"
- Buddy Miles – drums on "Rainy Day, Dream Away" and "Still Raining, Still Dreaming"
- Larry Faucette – congas on "Rainy Day, Dream Away" and "Still Raining, Still Dreaming"
- Chris Wood – flute on "1983... (A Merman I Should Turn to Be)"
- Brian Jones – percussion on "All Along the Watchtower"
- The Sweet Inspirations – backing vocals on "Burning of the Midnight Lamp"

Production

- Jimi Hendrix – producer, mixing, arrangements, US LP issue liner notes
- Eddie Kramer, Gary Kellgren – engineers, mixing
- David King – UK album sleeve design
- David Montgomery – UK outer sleeve and inside photography
- Karl Ferris – US cover design
- Ed Thrasher – US art direction
- Linda Eastman, David Sygall – US cover photography

Digital remastering

- Lee Herschberg – initial compact disc release
- Joe Gastwirt – 1989 compact disc release
- Eddie Kramer, George Marino – 1997 compact disc release
- Bernie Grundman, Scott Sedilo – 2018 anniversary compact disc release

== Charts ==
Chart performance for Electric Ladyland
Chart (1968)	Peak position
Canada RPM Top 50 Albums	1
Germany Charts	12
Norway Charts	13
UK Official Charts	6
US Billboard Top LPs	1
US Top R&B Albums	5

== Certifications ==
Certifications for Electric Ladyland
Region	Certification	Certified units/sales
France (SNEP)	Gold	100,000^{*}
Italy (FIMI)	Gold	25,000^{‡}
New Zealand (RMNZ)	Gold	7,500^{‡}
United Kingdom (BPI)	Gold	100,000^{^}
United States (RIAA)	3× Platinum	3,000,000^{‡}
^{*} Sales figures based on certification alone.^{^} Shipments figures based on certification alone.^{‡} Sales+streaming figures based on certification alone.

== Sources ==
- Aledort, Andy (1996). Jimi Hendrix: A Step-by-Step Breakdown of his Guitar Styles and Techniques. Hal Leonard. ISBN 0-7935-3659-6.
- Aledort, Andy (1991). Pollock, Bruce; Stix, John (eds.). "Performance notes: Jimi Hendrix, 'All Along the Watchtower'". Guitar Classics IV by Guitar: For the Practicing Musician.
- Black, Johnny (1999). Jimi Hendrix: The Ultimate Experience. Thunder's Mouth Press. ISBN 978-1-56025-240-5.
- Christgau, Robert (1998). Grown Up All Wrong: 75 Great Rock and Pop Artists from Vaudeville to Techno. Harvard University Press. p. 98. ISBN 0674443187.
- Cross, Charles R. (2005). Room Full of Mirrors: A Biography of Jimi Hendrix. Hyperion. ISBN 978-0-7868-8841-2.
- Dister, Alain (1995). Ezy rider: En voyage avec Jimi Hendrix [Ezy rider: On the road with Jimi Hendrix] (in French). France: Seuil. ISBN 978-2-0202-2929-6.
- Doggett, Peter (2004). Jimi Hendrix: The Complete Guide to his Music. Omnibus. ISBN 978-1-84449-424-8.
- Evans, Paul; Brackett, Nathan (2004). "Jimi Hendrix". In Brackett, Nathan; Hoard, Christian (eds.). The New Rolling Stone Album Guide (4th ed.). Simon & Schuster. ISBN 0-7432-0169-8.
- Fairchild, Michael (April 1991). "The Experience of a Lifetime". Guitar: For the Practicing Musician. 8 (6).
- George-Warren, Holly, ed. (2001). The Rolling Stone Encyclopedia of Rock & Roll (2005 revised and updated ed.). Fireside. ISBN 978-0-7432-9201-6.
- GP staff (May 2012). "Hendrix at 70". Guitar Player. 46 (5).
- Heatley, Michael (2009). Jimi Hendrix Gear: The Guitars, Amps & Effects that Revolutionized Rock 'n' Roll. Voyageur Press. ISBN 978-0-7603-3639-7.
- Hendrix, Janie L.; McDermott, John (2007). Jimi Hendrix: An Illustrated Experience. Atria. ISBN 978-0-7432-9769-1.
- Larkin, Colin (2006). The Encyclopedia of Popular Music. Vol. 4. Oxford University Press. ISBN 0-19-531373-9.
- Larson, Tom (2004). History of Rock and Roll. Kendall Hunt Pub. ISBN 978-0-7872-9969-9.
- Lawrence, Sharon (2005). Jimi Hendrix: The Intimate Story of a Betrayed Musical Legend. Harper. ISBN 978-0-06-056301-1.
- Levy, Joe, ed. (2005). Rolling Stone's 500 Greatest Albums of All Time (First Paperback ed.). Wenner Books. ISBN 978-1-932958-61-4.
- Mayer, John (2011). "Jimi Hendrix". In Brackett, Nathan (ed.). Rolling Stone: The 100 Greatest Artists of All Time. Rolling Stone.
- McDermott, John; Kramer, Eddie; Cox, Billy (2009). Ultimate Hendrix: An Illustrated Encyclopedia of Live Concerts and Sessions. BackBeat Books. ISBN 978-0-87930-938-1.
- McDermott, John; Kramer, Eddie (1992). Lewisohn, Mark (ed.). Hendrix: Setting the Record Straight. Grand Central. ISBN 978-0-446-39431-4.
- Wenner, Jann, ed. (December 8, 2011). "Rolling Stone: The 100 Greatest Guitarists of All Time". Rolling Stone. No. 1145. Archived from the original on September 4, 2017.
- Moskowitz, David (2010). The Words and Music of Jimi Hendrix. Praeger. ISBN 978-0-313-37592-7.
- Murray, Charles Shaar (1989). Crosstown Traffic: Jimi Hendrix and the Rock 'n' Roll Revolution (First US ed.). St. Martin's Press. ISBN 978-0-312-04288-2.
- Owen, Frank; Reynolds, Simon (April 1991). "Hendrix Lives! Why Jimi still matters". Spin. 7 (1).
- Perry, John (2004). "6. Reviews". Jimi Hendrix's Electric Ladyland. 33⅓. Bloomsbury Publishing. ISBN 1441129596.
- Potash, Chris, ed. (1996). The Jimi Hendrix Companion. Omnibus. ISBN 978-0-7119-6635-2.
- Roberts, David, ed. (2005). British Hit Singles & Albums (18 ed.). Guinness World Records Limited. ISBN 978-1-904994-00-8.
- Roby, Steven (2002). Black Gold: The Lost Archives of Jimi Hendrix. Billboard Books. ISBN 978-0-8230-7854-7.
- Roby, Steven; Schreiber, Brad (2010). Becoming Jimi Hendrix: From Southern Crossroads to Psychedelic London, the Untold Story of a Musical Genius. Da Capo. ISBN 978-0-306-81910-0.
- Rosen, Craig (1996). The Billboard Book of Number One Albums. Billboard. ISBN 978-0-8230-7586-7.
- Shadwick, Keith (2003). Jimi Hendrix: Musician. Backbeat Books. ISBN 978-0-87930-764-6.
- Shapiro, Harry; Glebbeek, Caesar (1995) [1990]. Jimi Hendrix: Electric Gypsy (New and Improved ed.). St. Martin's Press. ISBN 978-0-312-13062-6.
- Stubbs, David (2003). Jimi Hendrix: The Stories Behind Every Song. Da Capo Press. ISBN 1560255374.
- Unterberger, Richie (2009). The Rough Guide to Jimi Hendrix. Rough Guides. ISBN 978-1-84836-002-0.
- Wenner, Jann (2010) [2004]. 500 Greatest Songs of All Time. Rolling Stone. OCLC 641731526.
- Whitburn, Joel (2010). The Billboard Book of Top 40 Hits, 1955–2009 (9 ed.). Billboard Books. ISBN 978-0-8230-8554-5.
- Whitehill, Dave (1989). Hendrix: Electric Ladyland. Hal Leonard. ISBN 978-0-7935-3385-5.
