= Gary Kellgren =

American audio engineer (1939–1977)

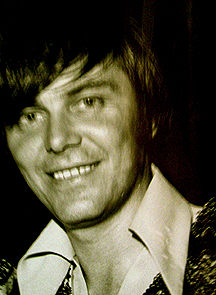
- Kellgren in 1969

Background information
- Born: Gary Wayne Kellgren; April 7, 1939; Shenandoah, Iowa, U.S.
- Died: July 20, 1977 (aged 38) Los Angeles, California, U.S.
- Occupation: Audio engineer
- Years active: 1967–1977
- Website: garykellgren.com

Gary Kellgren (April 7, 1939 – July 20, 1977) was an American audio engineer and co-founder of The Record Plant recording studios, along with businessman Chris Stone.

== Career ==
=== Engineering ===
Kellgren was a successful and well respected audio engineer (and occasional record producer) during the 1960s and 1970s. He began working at Apostolic Studios, Scepter Studios, and Mayfair Studios with musicians including Jimi Hendrix, Frank Zappa, and Wes Farrell. "Mayfair Studios were the best in New York, and Kellgren was the king of the advanced eight-track board."

Kellgren was an early user of "phasing", a studio technique which simulates the sound of a jet engine. He is also credited with pioneering other "psychedelic" sound effects, such as "flanging", a sound which is sometimes confused with automatic double tracking (ADT).

He worked with musicians including John Lennon, Ringo Starr, George Harrison, Mick Jagger, Ron Wood, Bill Wyman, Jimi Hendrix, B. B. King, Bobby Goldsboro, the Animals, Stevie Wonder, Carole King, Frank Zappa, Sly and the Family Stone, The Velvet Underground, CSNY, Rod Stewart, Ravi Shankar, Keith Moon, Barbra Streisand, and Neil Diamond. He also worked with producers such as Wes Farrell, Tom Wilson, Chas Chandler, Jack Douglas, Robert Margouleff, Phil Spector, and Bill Szymczyk.

He conceived of, and was responsible for, all the "Live at the Record Plant" recording sessions as well as the Jim Keltner Fan Club Hour; was sought out by George Harrison to record the Concert For Bangladesh which was later ranked as being No. 9 of the 50 Greatest Moments at Madison Square Garden; he also did the remote concert recording starring James Brown for the Muhammad Ali/George Foreman fight, "Rumble in the Jungle", in Zaire in 1974. He contributed spoken dialog to the Mothers of Invention's 1968 album We're Only in It for the Money, which he engineered as well. "I was there when he recorded Barbra Streisand, Paul Anka", said his business partner, Chris Stone:

He recorded Anka for years. Everything he touched in the studio was a hit. Gary is remarkable in the studio. He really is ... He has engineered and produced records for Ron Wood and Bill Wyman. Even if he had done nothing else in his life, Kellgren would be famous among musicians for a jam he produced in March 1975, a never-released song called "Too Many Cooks". Present for the session were John Lennon, Stevie Wonder, Billy Preston, Mick Jagger, Al Wilson, Harry Nilsson, Jim Keltner, Ringo Starr, and Danny Kootch. The song was aptly titled.

=== Design ===
Kellgren began his recording career at the Dick Charles demo recording studios in 1964 in the legendary Brill Building in Manhattan. Studios at that time had no décor to speak of. They "were sterile, utilitarian places. Engineers wore jackets and ties (or even lab coats!), and musicians performed under fluorescent lights and acoustical tile ceilings while seated on folding chairs. Amenities – if any – consisted of bad coffee and a few ashtrays. Record Plant broke that mold in a style that is now the stuff of legend." And when Kellgren and his partner Chris Stone opened the Record Plant, it was Kellgren's concept to bring color, artistic design, hotel-like comforts and services to the world of recording studios along with state-of-the-art technology and acoustical design.

In an interview for Mix magazine, Stone stated:

Gary was an institution. He single handedly was responsible for changing studios from what they were – fluorescent lights, white walls and hardwood floors – to the living rooms that they are today. His feeling, more than anyone else's, was that a studio should be a comfortable place to record. He was the one who first thought of the diversions, like the Jacuzzi he built in 1969. In those days that was unheard of. The only reason he built it was that I wouldn't agree to an Olympic size swimming pool in the parking lot. The Jacuzzi was Gary's compromise – and quite a surprise to me!

"There are tales told by the campfire, where rock mythology is discussed, that say the atmosphere created in that first studio and the ones to follow was so close to a good home and a fine hotel that songs were written to immortalize that special state of mind ... It is safe to surmise that no other 'facility' has ever lent so much of a creative edge to the works of art at hand."

=== Record Plant ===
In 1967, Kellgren and Stone built the first of the three Record Plant Recording Studios in Manhattan. Kellgren was the creative and recording side, Stone the business side, and their third partner, Ancky Johnson, Revlon heiress, provided the financial backing. Kellgren had already been working with many of the top artists of the day, like Hendrix, so when he opened the Record Plant, they followed. Mitch Mitchell: "We went there [the Record Plant NY] because Gary Kellgren, who we'd worked with at Mayfair, had raised the money with a partner and managed to start the Record Plant." The NY Record Plant was booked solid for three months in advance at the time of the opening.

The first album to come out of there was Electric Ladyland by Jimi Hendrix. Stone later said in an interview that

Gary, having worked all night, would very often be out cold on the couch, with Jimi still in the studio glaring through the haze at the speakers. They would sometimes go three and four days without stopping. Out of those sessions came Electric Ladyland, the Record Plant's first record. Other people have taken credit for the record, but about ninety percent of it was done in Studio A in New York with Gary and Jimi.

One of the last to record there was John Lennon, who left the studio to go home the night he was murdered.

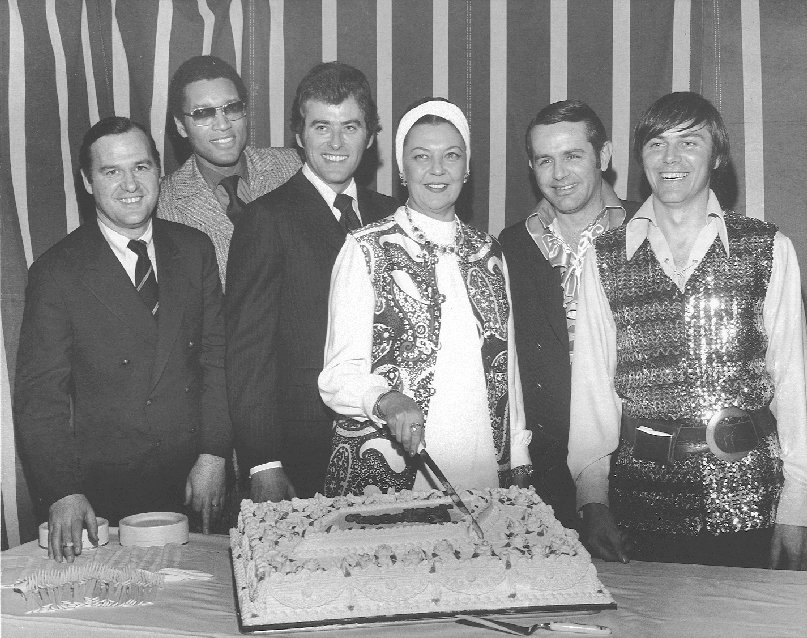
Opening celebration for the Record Plant in Los Angeles, December 4, 1969. Pictured L to R: Attorney Tom Butler, producer Tom Wilson, investors Ben Johnson and Ancky Johnson (cutting cake), founders Chris Stone and Gary Kellgren

Almost two years after the launch of the New York Studio, Kellgren and Stone opened up the Los Angeles Record Plant. The first big mix session was for the Woodstock soundtrack. It was also where John Lennon and Paul McCartney played together for the last time during an all night jam session in 1974.

Record Plant Sausalito opened in 1972, where Fleetwood Mac's Rumours was recorded as was Bob Marley and the Wailers' Talkin' Blues which was done live in a closed session for an in-studio broadcast from San Francisco radio station KSAN.

== Death ==
On July 20, 1977, Kellgren and his secretary and girlfriend Kristianne Gaines were found dead in the swimming pool at his residence in Hollywood. A business associate of Kellgren was in the house at the time; he called police and reported that Kellgren had recently been in surgery, and that he had been swimming in the deep end of the pool. Gaines, 34, a resident of Los Angeles, was last seen alive sitting on a raft in the pool; she could not swim. The incident was called "a double accidental drowning" by the police. Two days later, an investigator told reporters that there was no indication of "foul play". Guitarist Ronnie Wood wrote that Kellgren probably died from electric shock while trying to fix some underwater speakers in his pool, and that Gaines drowned trying to save him.

== Discography ==
=== Albums ===
- 1967: Chelsea Girl (Nico) – Engineer
- 1967: Down To Middle Earth (The Hobbits) – Engineer
- 1967: The Eyes of the Beacon Street Union (Beacon Street Union) – Engineer
- 1967: San Franciscan Nights (Eric Burdon & the Animals) – Engineer
- 1967: Winds of Change (Eric Burdon & the Animals) – Remixing
- 1967: The Velvet Underground & Nico (The Velvet Underground) – Engineer, Mixing
- 1968: The Twain Shall Meet (Eric Burdon & the Animals) – Remixing
- 1968: The Clown Died in Marvin Gardens (Beacon Street Union) – Engineer
- 1968: New Grass (Albert Ayler) – Engineer
- 1968: I Could Have Danced All Night (Central Nervous System) – Engineer
- 1968: Fraternity of Man (Fraternity of Man) – Remixing
- 1968: Harumi (Harumi) – Engineer, Remixing
- 1968: Electric Ladyland (Jimi Hendrix) – Engineer
- 1968: Cristo Redentor (Harvey Mandel) – Engineer
- 1968: We're Only in It for the Money (The Mothers of Invention) – Engineer, Whisper
- 1968: Lumpy Gravy (Frank Zappa) – Engineer
- 1968: High Flyin' Bird (Ill Wind) – Remixing
- 1968: Trout (Trout) – Engineer
- 1968: White Light/White Heat (The Velvet Underground) – Engineer
- 1968: The Soft Machine (album) (Soft Machine) – Engineer
- 1969: Street Giveth... And the Street Taketh Away (Cat Mother & the All Night Newsboys) – Engineer
- 1969: Sunrise (Eire Apparent) – Engineer
- 1969: Mothermania (The Mothers of Invention) – Engineer
- 1970: We Got To Live Together (Buddy Miles) – Engineer
- 1970: A Message to the People (Buddy Miles) – Producer, Engineer
- 1970: Evolution (Hedge & Donna) – Engineer
- 1970: Indianola Mississippi Seeds (B. B. King) – Engineer
- 1970: Country Funk (Country Funk) – Engineer
- 1970: A Bad Donato (João Donato) – Mixing, Engineer
- 1970: False Start (Love) – Engineer
- 1970: Purpose (Purpose) – Engineer
- 1971: Dave Mason & Cass Elliot (Dave Mason & Cass Elliot) – Engineer
- 1971: Band of Angels (Alan Parker) – Engineer
- 1971: Stoneground (Stoneground) – Engineer
- 1971: We've Only Just Begun (Claudine Longet) – Engineer
- 1972: Let's Spend the Night Together (Claudine Longet) – Engineer
- 1972: Peter Anders (Family LP) (Peter Anders) – Engineer
- 1973: Reevaluations: The Impulse Years (Albert Ayler) – Engineer
- 1973: Best of B.B. King (MCA) (B. B. King) – Engineer
- 1973: Kracker Brand (Kracker) – Engineer
- 1973: Coast to Coast: Overture and Beginners (Rod Stewart/Faces) – Engineer
- 1974: Live and in Color (Ballin' Jack) – Producer, Engineer
- 1974: Second Helping (Lynyrd Skynyrd) – Engineer
- 1974: I've Got My Own Album to Do (Ron Wood) – Producer
- 1975: Early Bird Cafe (Serfs) – Engineer
- 1975: Two Sides of the Moon (Keith Moon) – Engineer
- 1975: Lazy Afternoon (Barbra Streisand) – Engineer
- 1976: Nine On A Ten Scale (Sammy Hagar) – Engineer
- 1976: Stone Alone (Bill Wyman) – Engineer
- 1977: Where Did All the Money Go (Soundtrack) – Engineer

=== Later releases of recordings made before his death ===
- 1985: VU (The Velvet Underground) – Engineer (Recorded in 1969 by Kellgren, but not released until 1985)
- 1991: Crosby, Stills & Nash (Box Set) (Crosby, Stills & Nash) – Engineer
- 1993: What Goes On (The Velvet Underground) – Engineer
- 1995: Love Story 1966-1972 (Love) – Engineer
- 1995: Peel Slowly and See (The Velvet Underground) – Engineer
- 1995: In Celebration (Ravi Shankar) – Remastering
- 1996: The Lost Episodes (Frank Zappa) – Engineer
- 1997: South Saturn Delta (Jimi Hendrix) – Engineer
- 1997: Best of Buddy Miles (Buddy Miles) – Assistant Producer
- 2001: Voodoo Child: The Jimi Hendrix Collection (Jimi Hendrix) – Engineer
- 2002: Voodoo Child: The Jimi Hendrix Collection (UK Bonus Track) (Jimi Hendrix) – Engineer
- 2003: Street Giveth...And the Street Taketh Away (Bonus Tracks) (Cat Mother & the All Night Newsboys) – Engineer
- 2003: Martin Scorsese Presents the Blues: Jimi Hendrix (Jimi Hendrix) – Engineer
- 2004: The Twain Shall Meet (Bonus Tracks) (The Animals) – Remixing
- 2004: Five Guys Walk into a Bar... (Faces) – Engineer, Mixing
- 2004: The Experience Sessions (Noel Redding) – Engineer
- 2005: Retrospective (The Animals) – Remixing
- 2005: Gold (The Velvet Underground) – Engineer, Mixing
- 2005: Chronicles (The Velvet Underground) – Engineer
- 2005: Concert for Bangladesh (Bonus Track) (George Harrison) – Engineer
- 2005: Concert for Bangladesh (DVD)(Deluxe Edition) (George Harrison) – Engineer
- 2005: Concert for Bangladesh (DVD) (George Harrison) – Engineer
- 2006: The Velvet Underground Story (The Velvet Underground) – Engineer
- 2006: Two Sides of the Moon (Expanded) (Keith Moon) – Engineer
- 2007: Blue Thumb Recordings (Love) – Engineer
- 2008: Electric Ladyland (40th Anniversary Collector's Edition) (CD/DVD) (Jimi Hendrix) – Engineer

=== Concerts ===
- 1971: Concert For Bangladesh – Engineer
- 1973: Coast to Coast: Overture and Beginners – Engineer
- 1974: Rumble in the Jungle – Engineer
