= The Resurrection of Pigboy Crabshaw =

Studio album by the Paul Butterfield Blues Band
- Released: December 1967
- Genre: Blues
- Length: 44:29
- Label: Elektra
- Producer: John Court

The Paul Butterfield Blues Band chronology
| East-West (1966) | The Resurrection of Pigboy Crabshaw (1967) | In My Own Dream (1968) |

The Resurrection of Pigboy Crabshaw is the third album by the American blues rock band the Paul Butterfield Blues Band. The title name refers to a nickname for band member Elvin Bishop, whose role shifted to lead guitarist after Mike Bloomfield departed to form the Electric Flag. (Note: Bishop said Pigboy Crabshaw was a nickname he gave himself, but the album's title, which referred to his promotion to lead guitarist, was Butterfield's idea.) Released in 1967, the album marked a slight shift in the band's sound towards R&B and was the first Butterfield record to feature a horn section, which included a young David Sanborn on alto saxophone.

The Resurrection of Pigboy Crabshaw generally received mixed to favorable reviews from critics, and reached number 52 in the American Billboard 200 charts in 1968.

== Reception ==
Professional ratings
Review scores
| Source | Rating |
|---|---|
| AllMusic | 4.5/5 stars |
| Record Mirror | 3/5 stars |
| The New Rolling Stone Record Guide | 4/5 stars |

A review of The Resurrection of Pigboy Crabshaw in Record World described the album as "a beautiful-sounding, great-looking new package for fans". It called the Paul Butterfield Blues Band "dedicated purveyors of the blues", and added that the album's tracks are "rambling looks into the form" by the group. Reviewers at Record Mirror stated that on this album the band's blues sound has "hardened" with "stronger" and "more confiden[t]" vocals. They said the tracks' accompaniments are "clear and well recorded" with "clever" arrangements, although they preferred the band's own material to some of the covers they did, like "One More Heartache" and "Drivin' Wheel".

Rolling Stone magazine felt that the band's newly acquired horn section is not fully utilized on this album and tends to "riff unobtrusively" in the background, letting Bishop's guitar and Butterfield's voice take the lead. The solos are "short, though musically interesting", but often reduce to "mechanical-sounding, repetitive arrangements." The reviewer called "Drivin' Wheel" the album's "most successful" track, and concluded that while Resurrection "may not show the group to best advantage", they are "the most venturesome and exciting players of blues-based rock around".

=== Retrospective reviews ===
Michael G. Nastos wrote in a review of The Resurrection of Pigboy Crabshaw at AllMusic that Paul Butterfield "really com[es] into his own" here with his vocals and harmonica, and the band is "as cohesive a unit as you'd find in this time period". He described the closing track, "Tollin' Bells" as "somewhat psychedelic", adding that the guitar and the "slow, ringing, resonant keyboard evokes a haunting feeling." Overall Nastos called the album "likely the single best Butterfield album of this time period and you'd be well served to pick this one up."

Reviewing the CD reissue of The Resurrection of Pigboy Crabshaw and the band's next album, In My Own Dream on a compilation CD, Uncut magazine said the replacement of Mike Bloomfield by Elvin Bishop on lead guitar changed the band's sound from "South Side/Muddy Waters grit" to "the R&B/blues ballad/rock'n'soul feel of Albert King and Bobby 'Blue' Bland". The reviewer added that the album's "Memphis feel" is enhanced by "a tight, spurting horn section".

== Track listing ==
Side one
| No. | Title | Writer(s) | Length |
|---|---|---|---|
| 1. | "One More Heartache" | Smokey Robinson, Marvin Tarplin, Robert Rogers, Ronald White, Warren Moore | 3:20 |
| 2. | "Driftin' and Driftin'" | Charles Brown, Johnny Moore, Eddie Williams | 9:09 |
| 3. | "I Pity the Fool" | Deadric Malone | 6:00 |
| 4. | "Born Under a Bad Sign" | William Bell, Booker T. Jones | 4:10 |

Side two
| No. | Title | Writer(s) | Length |
|---|---|---|---|
| 1. | "Run Out of Time" | Paul Butterfield, Gene Dinwiddie | 2:59 |
| 2. | "Double Trouble" | Otis Rush | 5:38 |
| 3. | "Drivin' Wheel" | Roosevelt Sykes | 5:34 |
| 4. | "Droppin' Out" | Butterfield, Tucker Zimmerman | 2:16 |
| 5. | "Tollin' Bells" | Willie Dixon; arranged by the Paul Butterfield Blues Band | 5:23 |

== Personnel ==
The Butterfield Blues Band

- Paul Butterfield – vocals, harmonica
- Elvin Bishop – guitar
- Mark Naftalin – keyboards
- Bugsy Maugh – bass, vocals on "Drivin' Wheel"
- Phil Wilson – drums

with:

- Gene Dinwiddie – tenor saxophone
- David Sanborn – alto saxophone
- Keith Johnson – trumpet

Technical

- William S. Harvey – cover design, art direction
- Kim Whitesides – cover artwork
- Joel Brodsky – back cover photography

== Charts ==
| Year | Chart | Position |
|---|---|---|
| 1968 | US Billboard 200 | 52 |
