= Born in Chicago =

- Italian single picture sleeve

Song by the Paul Butterfield Blues Band

from the album The Paul Butterfield Blues Band
- Released: October 1965
- Recorded: 1965
- Studio: Mastertone, New York City
- Genre: Blues
- Length: 2:55
- Label: Elektra
- Songwriter(s): Nick Gravenites
- Producer(s): Paul Rothchild

"Born in Chicago" is a blues song written by Nick Gravenites. It was the opening track on the self-titled debut album by the Paul Butterfield Blues Band in 1965 and has since become a blues standard.

Gravenites, who was born in Chicago, first performed the song when in a duo with guitarist Mike Bloomfield, playing in clubs in the city in the early 1960s. When Bloomfield joined the Paul Butterfield Blues Band, he insisted that the band record it. Although Butterfield was at first reluctant to sing the song, the initial recording took place in the Mastertone Studio in New York City in April 1965, produced by Paul Rothchild for Elektra Records. The track was included on an Elektra Records sampler album, Folksong '65.

The popularity of the track led to Rothchild requiring a revised version, for inclusion on the band's debut album. The second recording, with additional organ by Mark Naftalin, additional choruses and solos, and using better recording equipment, took place in September 1965. The album was released in October 1965, and became successful as one of the first in the U.S. to present blues material to a predominantly white rock audience.

"Born in Chicago" was later recorded by a wide range of artists, including Jesse Colin Young (1972), Pixies (1990), George Thorogood (1991), Joe Louis Walker (2003), and Tom Petty (2004). In 2016, critic Jay Gentile wrote of the song: "...[It] could not be more relevant today. With lyrics that run though young friends who went down presumably to gun violence, the song could serve as a soundtrack to today’s gun violence debate."
