= In My Own Dream =

Studio album by Paul Butterfield Blues Band
- Released: July 1968
- Length: 36:29
- Label: Elektra
- Producer: John Court

Paul Butterfield Blues Band chronology
The Resurrection of Pigboy Crabshaw (1967)	In My Own Dream (1968)	Keep on Moving (1969)

Professional ratings
Review scores
Source	Rating
AllMusic	3.5/5 stars
Rolling Stone	(positive)

In My Own Dream is the fourth album by the American blues rock band Paul Butterfield Blues Band. Released in 1968, it continued the trend of its predecessor The Resurrection of Pigboy Crabshaw in moving towards a more soul-oriented sound, supported by a first rate horn section, (featuring a young David Sanborn), but was not so well-received either by critics or the public as its predecessor.

The title cut features a long solo by Sanborn on soprano saxophone. The drums were handled by Philip Wilson, who went on to jazz renown in the Art Ensemble of Chicago. The LP includes three songs written by bassist Bugsy Maugh, two of which he sings lead on. This album is also notable as the last Butterfield record with original members Mark Naftalin and Elvin Bishop, who both moved on to solo ventures of varying success.

== Track listing ==
1. "Last Hope's Gone" (Paul Butterfield, Jim Hayne, David Sanborn) – 4:52
2. "Mine to Love" (Bugsy Maugh) – 4:21
3. "Get Yourself Together" (Bugsy Maugh) – 4:10
4. "Just to Be With You" (Bernie Roth) – 6:12
5. "Morning Blues" (Bugsy Maugh) – 4:58
6. "Drunk Again" (Elvin Bishop) – 6:08
7. "In My Own Dream" (Paul Butterfield) – 5:48

== Personnel ==
The Butterfield Blues Band

- Paul Butterfield – harmonica; lead vocals on "Last Hope's Gone", "Just To Be With You" and "In My Own Dream", guitar on "In My Own Dream"
- Elvin Bishop – guitar; lead vocals on "Drunk Again"
- Mark Naftalin (credited as "Naffy Markham") – keyboards
- Bugsy Maugh – bass, backing vocals; lead vocals on "Mine To Love" and "Morning Blues"
- Phil Wilson – drums, congas, backing vocals; lead vocals on "Get Yourself Together"
- Gene Dinwiddie – tenor saxophone, flute, tambourine, backing vocals; mandolin on "In My Own Dream"
- David Sanborn – soprano saxophone, alto saxophone, baritone saxophone
- Keith Johnson – trumpet; piano on "Drunk Again"

Additional personnel

- John Court – backing vocals
- Al Kooper – organ on "Drunk Again" and "Just To Be With You"

Technical

- William S. Harvey – art direction
- Gene Szafran – artwork

== Charts ==
Billboard (North America)

Year	Chart	Position
1968	Pop Albums	79
