= It's Not Killing Me =

Studio album by Mike Bloomfield
- Released: 1969
- Recorded: Golden State Recording, San Francisco; Wally Heider Studios, San Francisco; Columbus Studios, San Francisco; Columbia Records, Los Angeles
- Genre: Blues rock, country rock
- Length: 36:43
- Label: Columbia
- Producer: Nick Gravenites, Michael Melford

Mike Bloomfield chronology
It's Not Killing Me (1969)	If You Love These Blues, Play 'Em as You Please (1976)

It's Not Killing Me is the debut solo album by American blues guitarist Mike Bloomfield. It was released in 1969 through Columbia Records. Following his success with the Paul Butterfield Blues Band, The Electric Flag, and in the Super Session recordings with Al Kooper, Bloomfield teamed up with former colleagues to record this largely self-written album.

The album peaked at No. 127 on the Billboard 200.

== Reception ==
Professional ratings
Review scores
Source	Rating
AllMusic	2/5 stars
The Encyclopedia of Popular Music	2/5 stars
MusicHound Rock: The Essential Album Guide	3.5/5 stars
Rolling Stone	(negative)
The Rolling Stone Album Guide	3/5 stars

AllMusic criticized its "lack of a powerful vocalist" and the under-use of Bloomfield's guitar, going so far as to say "it makes about as much sense as Led Zeppelin having Jimmy Page sing lead while Robert Plant played tambourine!"

== Track listing ==
All tracks have words and music credited to Mike Bloomfield, except as indicated.

=== Side one ===
1. "If You See My Baby" – 3:07
2. "For Anyone You Meet" – 4:07
3. "Good Old Guy" – 3:21
4. "Far Too Many Nights" – 5:07
5. "It's Not Killing Me" – 3:14

=== Side two ===
1. "Next Time You See Me" (Ben Tucker) – 2:57
2. "Michael's Lament" – 4:22
3. "Why Must My Baby" – 2:38
4. "The Ones I Loved Are Gone" – 3:07
5. "Don't Think About It Baby" – 3:33
6. "Goofers" – 1:50

== Personnel ==
- Michael Bloomfield – lead guitar, vocals, piano, acoustic guitar
- Bob Jones – drums, vocals
- Ronny Schreff – drums, mallets, percussion
- John Kahn – bass
- Fred Olson – rhythm guitar, acoustic guitar
- Ira Kamin – organ, piano, banjo
- Mark Naftalin – organ, piano
- Roy Ruby – organ
- Michael Melford – guitar, mandolin, vocals
- Nick Gravenites – vocals
- Orville "Red" Rhodes – steel guitar
- Ron Stallings – tenor saxophone
- Mark Teel – baritone saxophone
- Gerald Oshita – baritone and tenor saxophone
- Noel Jewkes – soprano and tenor saxophone
- John Wilmeth – trumpet
- Marcus Doubleday – trumpet
- Richard Santi – accordion
- The Ace of Cups – vocals
- Diane Tribuno – vocals

Technical

- Daily Planet – cover design
- Don Wilson – cover illustration
- Peter Amft (son of Robert Amft) – cover photograph
- Jim Marshall – rear cover photograph
