= Get Out of My Life, Woman =

1965 song by Lee Dorsey

Single by Lee Dorsey
- B-side: "So Long"
- Released: December 1965
- Genre: Rhythm and blues
- Length: 2:32
- Label: Amy
- Songwriter: Allen Toussaint
- Producer: Allen Toussaint

Lee Dorsey singles chronology
"Work, Work, Work" (1965)	"Get Out of My Life, Woman" (1965)	"Confusion" (1966)

"Get Out of My Life, Woman" is a song written by Allen Toussaint and first recorded by Lee Dorsey. It reached number five on the U.S. Billboard R&B chart and number 44 on the Hot 100 singles chart in 1966.

The song is one of the most sampled songs of all time.

== Background ==
In a song review for AllMusic, Mark Deming commented on the lyrics: "In short, the song is about as prototypical as R&B gets, though Lee Dorsey's great vocal performance and Allen Toussaint's expert arrangement give their version a distinctive edge".

Other artists have also adapted the song, including Paul Butterfield, the Leaves, Solomon Burke, Iron Butterfly, the Kingsmen, Roy Head, and Freddie King, according to Deming. In a review of the Paul Butterfield Blues Band album East-West (1966), he commented "highlights came when the band pushed into new territory, such as the taut New Orleans proto-funk of 'Get Out of My Life, Woman'".

The Jerry Garcia Band included a version of the song on their self titled live album from 1991 recorded at The Warfield in San Francisco.

== Chart performance ==
Chart (1966)	Peak position
UK Singles (The Official Charts Company)	22
US Billboard Hot 100	44
US Top Selling Rhythm & Blues Singles (Billboard)	5
