= Trevor Lawrence (musician) =

American saxophonist

- Genres: Jazz, R&B
- Occupations: Musician, composer, arranger, producer
- Instrument: Saxophones

Trevor Lawrence is an American saxophonist (baritone and tenor saxes), composer, arranger and record producer.

As a session musician, Lawrence has performed both as a studio musician and as a touring musician in the horn sections for groups including the Rolling Stones – with Steve Madaio and Bobby Keys – and with the Paul Butterfield Blues Band – along with Madaio, David Sanborn and Gene Dinwiddie – that performed at the Woodstock music festival in 1969.

As an arranger, Lawrence collaborated on Etta James' 1973 album Etta James and on the Pointer Sisters' 1982 So Excited! album, which he also co-produced.

== Personal life ==
Lawrence was married to Lynda Laurence of the Supremes. They have a son, Trevor Lawrence Jr, born in 1974, who is a session musician and producer under Dr. Dre's Aftermath Entertainment.

== Discography ==
=== As producer/co-producer ===
- 1976: ...That's the Way It Is – Harry Nilsson
- 1982: So Excited! – Pointer Sisters
- 1984: In the Evening – Sheryl Lee Ralph

=== As sideman ===
- 1969: Keep On Moving – The Butterfield Blues Band
- 1972: Trouble Man – Marvin Gaye
- 1972: Talking Book – Stevie Wonder
- 1972: Guess Who – B. B. King
- 1973: Ringo – Ringo Starr
- 1974: I Can Stand a Little Rain – Joe Cocker
- 1975: Duit on Mon Dei – Harry Nilsson
- 1975: Playing Possum – Carly Simon
- 1975: Jamaica Say You Will – Joe Cocker
- 1976: Sandman – Harry Nilsson
- 1976: Songs in the Key of Life – Stevie Wonder
- 1976: Sweet Harmony – Maria Muldaur
- 1977: Reckless Abandon – David Bromberg
- 1979: The Glow – Bonnie Raitt
- 1981: Black & White – Pointer Sisters
