= Look on Yonder Wall =

Song first recorded by James "Beale Street" Clark in 1945

"Get Ready to Meet Your Man"

Single by James "Beale Street" Clark
- B-side: "Love Me or Let Me Be"
- Released: 1945
- Recorded: October 24, 1945
- Genre: Blues
- Label: Columbia
- Songwriter: James Clark

"Look on Yonder Wall" (or "Look over Yonders Wall"; originally titled "Get Ready to Meet Your Man") is a blues song first recorded in 1945 by James "Beale Street" Clark. Clark, also known as "Memphis Jimmy", was a blues pianist from Memphis, Tennessee. During the 1940s, he appeared on recordings by Jazz Gillum, Red Nelson (also known as Dirty Red), and an early Muddy Waters session, as well as several singles in his own name.

In 1961, Elmore James adapted the song, titled "Look on Yonder Wall", which was issued as single. Most subsequent renditions show James's influence.

== Origins ==
"Look on Yonder Wall" was performed as a mid-tempo twelve-bar blues, with a recurrent post-World War II theme. It tells of a "man who is somewhat disabled and has not been drafted and takes advantage of that to entertain lonely married women". When the husband is discharged, the narrator ponders his fate:

Now baby I've been worried, ever since victory day
Every time I pick up the paper, your man is comin' this a way
Look on yonder wall, hand me down my walkin' cane

Jazz Gillum, with whom the song is often associated, recorded a version on February 18, 1946, four months after Clark. Although the release was retitled, it credits "James Clark" as the composer. Other early versions include Arthur "Big Boy" Crudup as "Hand Me Down My Walking Cane" and Boyd Gilmore as "Just an Army Boy".

== Elmore James version ==
In 1961, Elmore James recorded his version as "Look on Yonder Wall" for Bobby Robinson's Fire Records. The session took place at Cosimo Matassa's J&M Studios in New Orleans, Louisiana; backing James on vocal and guitar are Sammy Myers on harmonica, Johnny "Big Moose" Walker on piano, Sammy Lee Bully on bass, and King Mose on drums. The song is one of the few Elmore James songs to feature harmonica, as he typically used saxophone. Myers' harp playing on the song and other 1961 recordings for Fire has been described as "exemplary".

Fire released the song as the flip side of "Shake Your Moneymaker" in 1961. It was one of the last singles of new material released before James's death in 1963.

== Other renditions ==
Most artists who recorded "Look on Yonder Wall" after James follow his arrangement, but the songwriter credits vary. In 1962 or 1963, Junior Parker recorded the song with the title "Yonder's Wall". Duke Records issued it as a single and listed the songwriter as "Eddie James". Junior Wells with Buddy Guy recorded it for their influential 1965 album Hoodoo Man Blues. With the shorter title "Yonder Wall", the credit reads "Trad.-P.D." An album review noted Wells' vocals "were delivered with an equally powerful twist of individuality. [His] grunts, moans and sighs were potent with sexual suggestion."

Also in 1965, the Paul Butterfield Blues Band recorded the song as "Look Over Yonders Wall". It was included as the final track on their self-titled debut, with the writer listed as "J. Clark". Their version, which features slide guitar and soloing by Mike Bloomfield, is listed at number 27 on Rolling Stone magazine's list of the "100 Greatest Guitar Songs of All Time".

A related song is "Boot Hill", of which relatively little is known. Johnny Winter and Stevie Ray Vaughan each recorded versions for their respective albums Guitar Slinger (1984) and The Sky Is Crying (1989, released 1991). The lyrics for "Boot Hill" are more ominous than the earlier variations: "Look on yonder wall, hand me down my walkin' cane" is rendered "Look up on the wall baby, hand me down my shootin' iron".
