= John Anderson (director) =

American film director, producer, and writer (born 1954)

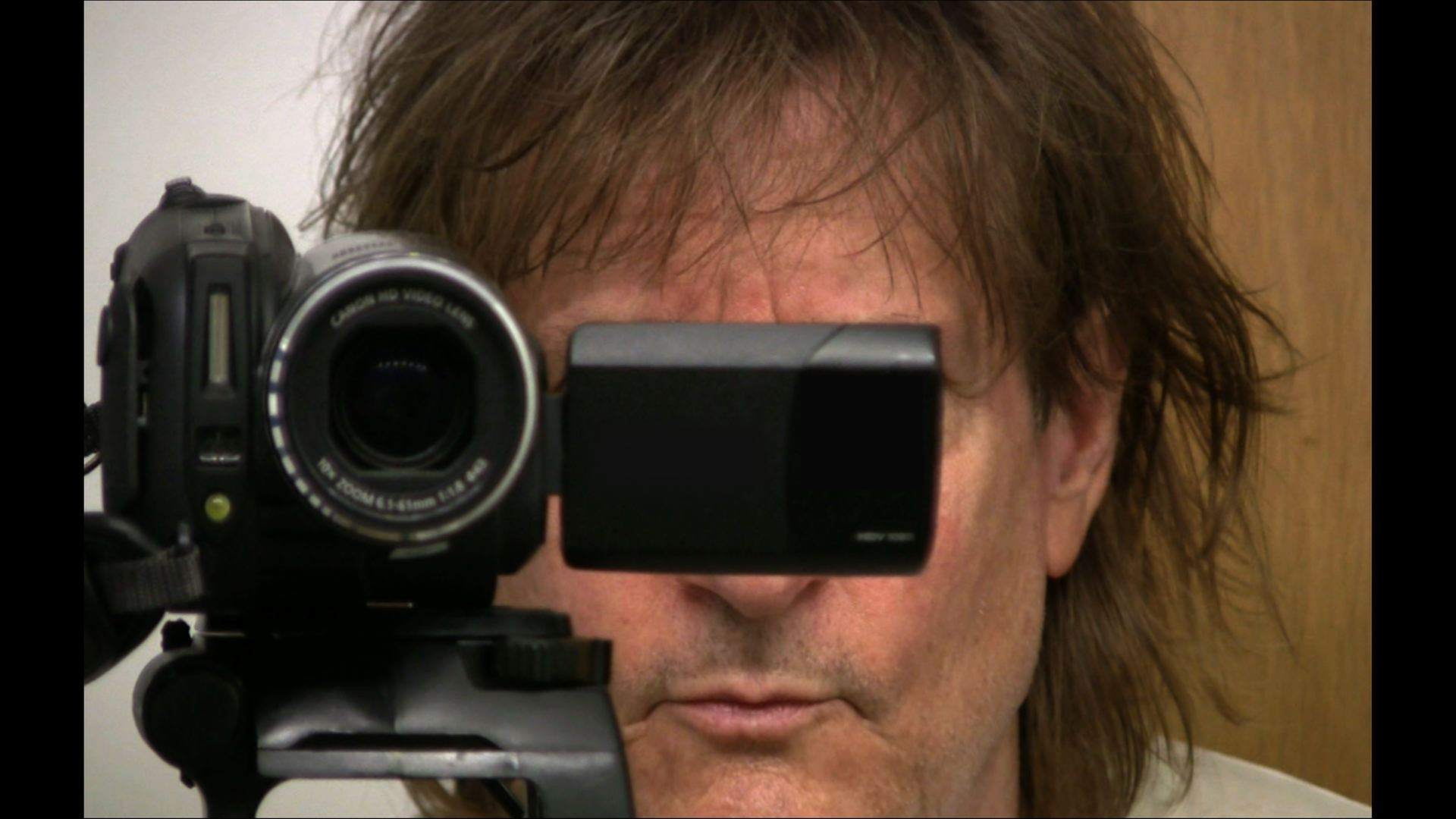
- Anderson in Chicago in 2018
- Born: January 12, 1954 (age 72); Columbus, Ohio, U.S.
- Education: Northwestern University
- Occupations: Film Director, Producer, Editor and Writer
- Years active: 1990s–present
- Notable work: Brian Wilson Presents SMiLE (2005); Horn From The Heart: The Paul Butterfield Story (2017)
- Website: thisisandersonproductions.com

John Anderson (born January 12, 1954) is an American documentary film director, producer, editor and writer. His primary subjects are rock, blues and folk musicians. Anderson often makes films about musicians he admires, such as Brian Wilson, the American singer, songwriter, and record producer who co-founded The Beach Boys. His interest in film-making began when he saw Richard Lester’s “A Hard Day's Night” at the age of 10. Some of Anderson's inspirations are the works of many filmmakers, including Michelangelo Antonioni (Blowup, 1966), Murray Lerner (Festival, 1967) and Jerry Lewis (The Disorderly Orderly, 1964). He is an alumnus of Northwestern University School of Communication, where he studied Radio/TV/Film and Music Theory & Composition.

== Early life and education ==
Anderson was born in Columbus, Ohio in 1954. He spent his childhood in Rochester, New York, and San Rafael, California before moving as a teenager to Lafayette Hill, Pennsylvania near Philadelphia. He started making films at that time, shooting on 8mm stock and composing and recording musical accompaniment. After graduation from Plymouth-Whitemarsh High School in Pennsylvania, he moved to Illinois where he attended Northwestern University in Evanston, studying Radio/TV/Film and Music Theory & Composition. While at Northwestern, he made a series of works using film and reel-to-reel videotape as a student of Dana Hodgdon and James Benning. Anderson also edited Northwestern's humor magazine The Purple Parrot and produced a weekly radio show on WNUR called Rough Cut, which included live recordings he made in Chicago-area folk, blues, and rock clubs. Don’t Blame Me, Anderson's 1973 live recording of Chicago singer-songwriter Steve Goodman, was released commercially by Red Pajamas Records in 2013. Goodman's body of work includes the well-known song City of New Orleans. In 1997, he directed and edited Larger Than Life: A Celebration of Steve Goodman and His Music, a live concert held at Chicago's Medinah Temple, which was released on DVD by Red Pajamas Records in 2007, and features John Prine, Arlo Guthrie, Emmylou Harris, Lyle Lovett and Jackson Browne.

== Career ==
Anderson began his career as an editor at Chicago film production/post-production facilities including Advanced Systems; Telemation; Post Effects; and IPA The Editing House. While at Post Effect, he edited The Super Bowl Shuffle (1985), featuring the championship Chicago Bears. At the time, The Super Bowl Shuffle was the second-highest selling music video. Shortly after the release of The Super Bowl Shuffle, the Chicago Bears defeated the New England Patriots at Super Bowl XX winning the NFL Championship on January 26, 1986. Anderson was also named Screen Magazine's Editor of the Year and won a Best Editor of a Music Video International Monitor Award for the music video She Won’t French Kiss by his own band, The Cleaning Ladys. He subsequently worked as a documentary editor for Bill Kurtis at Kurtis Productions on several series, including The New Explorers (PBS), NOVΛ and A&E's Investigative Reports.

In 1995, Anderson was one of the founding partners of Superior Street, a Chicago video and film production studio. While there, he began his professional relationship with Beach Boys leader Brian Wilson, leading to a series of four DVD collaborations with Wilson, beginning with Imagination (1999); Brian Wilson On Tour (2002); “Pet Sounds Live In London” (2003), and finally, “Brian Wilson Presents SMiLE” (2005), the live performance platinum-selling DVD release from Warner Brothers/Rhino Home Video for which he was nominated in 2006 for a Grammy Award as director. In 2012, Anderson co-directed, co-edited and co-wrote the PBS documentary The Beach Boys: Doin’ It Again He also directed and filmed Brian Wilson's performance of the title song in the 2014 biopic Love & Mercy, starring John Cusack, Paul Dano and Elizabeth Banks.

In 2007, he founded Anderson Productions, where he continues making films such as the Chicago blues documentary Born In Chicago, featuring Nick Gravenites, Corky Siegel, Sam Lay, and Barry Goldberg and also starring Keith Richards, Charlie Musselwhite, Hubert Sumlin and Jack White. Born In Chicago premiered at the 2013 South By Southwest Film Festival and screened at New York City's Lincoln Center, Chicago's Gene Siskel Film Center, The Grammy Museum in Los Angeles and The Rock and Roll Hall of Fame. It has been the subject of feature articles in Rolling Stone and The New York Times. The film is produced by Out The Box Records. In 2008 and Anderson received an Emmy as the Executive Producer of CPS Right Now!, a biweekly television news-magazine he created for the Chicago Public Schools, for which he also received 9 Emmy nominations.

In 2015, Anderson directed and edited Sam Lay In Bluesland, a documentary about legendary Chicago blues drummer Sam Lay, featuring James Cotton and Iggy Pop. It aired on PBS in 2017 and kicked off the 2017 Chicago Blues Festival with a screening at the Chicago Cultural Center. The film is produced by Starr Sutherland and executive produced by Michael Prussian. Anderson's latest film, Horn From The Heart: The Paul Butterfield Story, co-written by him and executive producer Sandra Warren, is a documentary about the life and career of blues harmonica great Paul Butterfield. The much-acclaimed film had its world premiere at the Newport Beach Film Festival and was a New York Times Critic's Pick. Its 2018-2019 theatrical run in select cities in the United States included a screening at The Rock and Roll Hall of Fame. The film was executive produced, produced and co-written by Sandra Warren and features David Sanborn, Bonnie Raitt, Elvin Bishop, Jac Holzman, B.B. King, Maria Muldaur, Marshall Chess, Todd Rundgren, Bob Dylan and the late Michael Bloomfield and is expected to be released commercially in 2019.

== Filmography ==
=== Filmography (as Director) ===
==== Feature-length films ====
- In Glorious Smell-O-Vision! (2019) (Co-Director)
- Horn From The Heart: The Paul Butterfield Story (2017)
- Sam Lay In Bluesland (2016)
- Corky Siegel's Chamber Blues Live at Shure (2016)
- Born in Chicago (2013)
- The Beach Boys: Doin’ It Again (2012) [Co-Director]
- Larger Than Life: A Celebration of Steve Goodman and His Music (2007)
- Brian Wilson Presents SMiLE (2005)
- Brian Wilson Presents Pet Sounds Live in London/Pet Stories (2003)
- Brian Wilson on Tour (2003)

===== In Production =====
- My Friend Tiny Tim
- Joey Molland: Liverpool to Memphis
- The Manhattan Transfer Story

==== Television ====
- CPS Right Now! (2006-2008)
- Brian Wilson's Imagination (1999)

=== Filmography (as Editor) ===
==== Television ====
- The Oprah Winfrey Show: Documentary roll-in segments (1995-2003)
- Investigative Reports (1992-1995)
- The New Explorers (1988-1993)
- NOVA: Back To Chernobyl (1989)
