= Keep On Moving (The Butterfield Blues Band album) =

Studio album by Paul Butterfield Blues Band
- Released: October 1969
- Length: 42:09
- Label: Elektra
- Producer: Jerry Ragovoy

Paul Butterfield Blues Band chronology
In My Own Dream (1968)	Keep On Moving (1969)	Live (1970)

Professional ratings
Review scores
Source	Rating
AllMusic	3/5 stars
Robert Christgau	A
The Encyclopedia of Popular Music	2/5 stars
Rolling Stone	unfavourable

Keep On Moving is the fifth album by the American blues rock band Paul Butterfield Blues Band. Released in 1969, it continues in the same R&B/soul-influenced horn-driven direction as the band's 1968 album In My Own Dream.

Keep On Moving reached number 102 on the Billboard 200.

== Track listing ==
1. "Love March" (Gene Dinwiddie, Phil Wilson) – 2:58
2. "No Amount of Loving" (Paul Butterfield) – 3:14
3. "Morning Sunrise" (Paul Butterfield, Phil Wilson) – 2:41
4. "Losing Hand" (Charles Calhoun) – 3:35
5. "Walking By Myself" (James A. Lane) – 4:31
6. "Except You" (Jerry Ragovoy) – 3:53
7. "Love Disease" (Gene Dinwiddie) – 3:29
8. "Where Did My Baby Go" (Jerry Ragovoy) – 4:23
9. "All in a Day" (Rod Hicks) – 2:28
10. "So Far So Good" (Rod Hicks) – 2:28
11. "Buddy's Advice" (Howard Feiten) – 3:21
12. "Keep On Moving" (Paul Butterfield) – 5:02

== Personnel ==
The Butterfield Blues Band

- Paul Butterfield – vocals, harmonica; flute on "Love March"
- Gene Dinwiddie – tenor saxophone, flute; lead vocals on "Love March", chorus vocals on "All In A Day"
- David Sanborn – alto saxophone
- Trevor Lawrence – baritone saxophone
- Keith Johnson – trumpet
- Steve Madaio – trumpet
- Howard "Buzz" Feiten – guitar, piano, organ; French horn on "Love March", lead vocals on "All In A Day" and "Buddy's Advice"
- Ted Harris – piano
- Rod Hicks – bass, cello; lead vocals on "All In A Day"
- Phillip Wilson – drums, percussion; lead vocals on "Love March", chorus vocals on "All In A Day"

Additional personnel

- Jerry Ragovoy – piano on "Where Did My Baby Go"
- Fred Beckmeier – bass on "Where Did My Baby Go" and "Buddy's Advice"

== Charts ==
Billboard - (United States)

Year	Chart	Position
1968	Pop Albums	102
