= East-West (The Butterfield Blues Band album) =

Studio album by the Butterfield Blues Band
- Released: August 1966
- Recorded: July 1966
- Studios: Chess, Chicago
- Genres: Blues; blues rock
- Length: 44:55
- Label: Elektra
- Producers: Mark Abramson; Paul Rothchild; Frazier Mohawk

The Butterfield Blues Band chronology
| The Paul Butterfield Blues Band (1965) | East-West (1966) | The Resurrection of Pigboy Crabshaw (1967) |

Professional ratings
Review scores
| Source | Rating |
|---|---|
| AllMusic | 5/5 stars |
| The Penguin Guide to Blues Recordings | 4/4 stars |

East-West is the second album by the American blues rock band the Butterfield Blues Band, released in 1966 on the Elektra label. (Note: Catalog number EKS 7315 in stereo, EKL 315 in mono.) It peaked at No. 65 on the Billboard pop albums chart, and is regarded as highly influential by rock and blues music historians.

== Content ==
The album was recorded at the famed Chess Studios on 2120 South Michigan Avenue in Chicago.

Like the band's eponymous debut album, this album features traditional blues covers and the guitar work of Mike Bloomfield and Elvin Bishop. Unlike the debut album, Bishop also contributed guitar solos; drummer Sam Lay had left the band due to illness and was replaced by the more jazz-oriented Billy Davenport. The social complexion of the band changed as well; ruled by Butterfield in the beginning, it evolved into more of a democracy both in terms of financial reward and input into repertoire.

One result was the inclusion of two all-instrumental extended jams at the instigation of Bloomfield following the group's successful appearance at the Fillmore in San Francisco during March alongside Jefferson Airplane. Both reflected his love of jazz, as the blue note-laden "Work Song" featuring harmonica by Butterfield had become a hard bop standard, and the title track "East-West" used elements of modal jazz as introduced by Miles Davis on his ground-breaking Kind of Blue album. Bloomfield had become enamored of work by John Coltrane in that area, especially his incorporation of ideas from Indian raga music. The album also included Michael Nesmith's song "Mary, Mary," which Nesmith would soon record with his band The Monkees - although original pressings of East-West did not include a songwriter's credit for this track.

On October 29, 2001, a reissue of this album remastered by Bob Irwin at Sundazed Studios and coupled with the debut appeared on Rhino WEA UK for the European market.

== "East-West" in music history ==
In 1996, original Butterfield Blues Band member Mark Naftalin (keyboards), who recorded on the album and is pictured on the cover of East-West, released a CD on his own 'Winner' label entitled East-West Live, comprising three extended live performance versions of the tune "East-West". Noted music critic and prolific author Dave Marsh contributed a substantial essay in the liner notes regarding the historic importance of the song, both the original 1966 recording and the live versions.

Marsh, interviewing Naftalin, notes that the tune was inspired by an all-night LSD trip that "East-West"'s primary songwriter Mike Bloomfield experienced in the fall of 1965, during which the late guitarist "said he'd had a revelation into the workings of Indian music."

Marsh's expansive liner notes observe that the song "East-West" "was an exploration of music that moved modally, rather than through chord changes. As Naftalin explains, "The song was based, like Indian music, on a drone. In Western musical terms, it 'stayed on the one'. The song was tethered to a four-beat bass pattern and structured as a series of sections, each with a different mood, mode and color, always underscored by the drummer, who contributed not only the rhythmic feel but much in the way of tonal shading, using mallets as well as sticks on the various drums and the different regions of the cymbals. In addition to playing beautiful solos, Paul [Butterfield] played important, unifying things [on harmonica] in the background–– chords, melodies, counterpoints, counter-rhythms. This was a group improvisation. In its fullest form it lasted over an hour."

In his summation, Marsh points out that "'East-West' can be heard as part of what sparked the West Coast's rock revolution, in which such song structures with extended improvisatory passages became commonplace."

Going on to call the Butterfield Blues Band "one of the greatest bands of the rock era", Marsh concludes that "With 'East-West', above any other extended piece of the mid-Sixties, a rock band finally achieved a version of the musical freedom that free jazz had found a few years earlier."

The album is also credited with having helped spawn the harder acid rock sound. The track "East-West", with its early use of the extended rock solo, has been described as laying "the roots of psychedelic acid rock" and featuring "much of acid-rock's eventual DNA".

The band members appearing on the album were all inducted into the Rock and Roll Hall of Fame in 2015.

== Album cover ==
The album's cover art was photographed at the Museum of Science and Industry in Chicago.

== Track listing ==
=== Side one ===
| No. | Title | Writer(s) | Length |
|---|---|---|---|
| 1. | "Walkin' Blues" | Robert Johnson | 3:15 |
| 2. | "Get Out of My Life, Woman" | Allen Toussaint | 3:13 |
| 3. | "I Got a Mind to Give Up Living" | Traditional | 4:57 |
| 4. | "All These Blues" | Traditional | 2:18 |
| 5. | "Work Song" (instrumental) | Nat Adderley, Oscar Brown Jr. | 7:53 |

=== Side two ===
| No. | Title | Writer(s) | Length |
|---|---|---|---|
| 1. | "Mary, Mary" | Michael Nesmith | 2:48 |
| 2. | "Two Trains Running" | Muddy Waters | 3:50 |
| 3. | "Never Say No" | Traditional | 2:57 |
| 4. | "East-West" (instrumental) | Mark Naftalin, Nick Gravenites | 13:10 |

== Personnel ==
The Butterfield Blues Band

- Paul Butterfield — vocals, harmonica
- Mike Bloomfield — electric guitar
- Elvin Bishop — electric guitar, lead vocals on "Never Say No"
- Jerome Arnold — bass
- Billy Davenport — drums
- Mark Naftalin — piano, organ

Technical

- Jac Holzman - production supervisor
- William S. Harvey - cover design, photography

== Charts ==
| Year | Chart | Position |
|---|---|---|
| 1967 | Billboard Pop Albums | 65 |
