= Mother Earth (American band) =

American blues rock band

Mother Earth was an eclectic American blues rock band formed in 1967 in California, fronted by singer Tracy Nelson.

Nelson, who hailed from Madison, Wisconsin, began her career as a solo artist, but formed the Mother Earth ensemble after moving to San Francisco. The group performed at the Avalon Ballroom and Fillmore Auditorium in the late 1960s, and was included on the soundtrack to the 1968 film Revolution. The group signed to Mercury Records, recording four albums. Mike Bloomfield played guitar on their 1968 release Living with the Animals, and Boz Scaggs contributed to their 1969 release Make A Joyful Noise. In addition to blues, the early incarnation of the group displayed influences from gospel, R&B, jazz, country and even a touch of psychedelia. After the first album, Mother Earth moved their base of operations from the Bay Area to a farm outside of Nashville, Tennessee. The nucleus of the band solidified around Nelson, keyboardist Andy McMahon and guitarist John "Toad" Andrews. Their manager and producer was Travis Rivers. Nelson was an astute judge of up-and-coming songwriters and was an early supporter of then largely unknown names like John Hiatt, Steve Young, and Eric Kaz. Mother Earth's version of Young's "Seven Bridges Road" predates the Eagles' cover by about nine years. After two LPs with Reprise Records and one with Columbia Records the ensemble continued to tour as Nelson's backup band but did not record anymore. They finally called it quits in early 1977. Tracy Nelson meanwhile returned to recording as a solo artist in 1974, issuing LPs on Atlantic Records, MCA Records, Adelphi Records, Flying Fish Records, and others.

== Members ==
1967: Tracy Nelson, Powell St. John, George Rains, Wayne Talbert, Ira Kamin, Jance Garfat.

1968: Tracy Nelson, Powell St. John, John Andrews, Bob Arthur, George Rains, Luis Gasca, Mark Naftalin.

1969: Tracy Nelson, Powell St.John, John Andrews, Bob Arthur, Boz Scaggs, Lonnie Castille, Clayborne Cotton.

1970: Tracy Nelson, John Andrews, Andy McMahon, Bob Cardwell, David Zettner, Karl Himmel, James Day.

1971: Tracy Nelson, John Andrews, Andy McMahon, Bob Cardwell, Karl Himmel, Tim Drummond.

- Tracy Nelson
- Powell St. John
- Wayne Talbert (early member prior to first album)
- Ira Kamin (early member prior to first album)
- John Andrews
- Bob Arthur
- Mark Naftalin
- George Rains
- Boz Scaggs
- Ronald Stallings
- Lonnie Castille
- Clayborne Cotton
- Johnny Gimble (not actually a member, but a frequent contributor on albums)
- Bob Cardwell
- Karl Himmel
- Andrew McMahon
- David Zettner
- James Clayton Day (Jimmie Day)
- Tim Drummond
- Jack Lee
- Steve Mendell
- Jerry Carrigan
- Beau Dollar
- Luis Gasca

== Discography ==
- Living with the Animals (Mercury Records, 1968) U.S. No. 144
- Mother Earth Presents Tracy Nelson Country (Mercury Records, 1969) - Tracy Nelson's solo album, recorded with the participation of some members of the band.
- Make A Joyful Noise (Mercury Records, 1969) U.S. No. 95
- Satisfied (Mercury Records, 1970)
- Bring Me Home (Reprise Records, 1971) U.S. No. 199
- Tracy Nelson/Mother Earth (Reprise Records, 1972) U.S. No. 205
- Poor Man's Paradise (Columbia Records, 1973) U.S. No. 210
