= Fathers and Sons (album) =

Studio album / Live album by Muddy Waters
- Released: August 1969
- Recorded: April 21–23, 1969 at Tel Mar Studios in Chicago, Illinois; April 24, 1969 at the Super Cosmic Joy-Scout Jamboree in Chicago, Illinois
- Genre: Chicago blues
- Length: 64:32
- Label: Chess
- Producer: Norman Dayron

Muddy Waters chronology
After the Rain (1969)	Fathers and Sons (1969)	Live at Mr. Kelly's (1971)

Professional ratings
Review scores
Source	Rating
AllMusic	3/5 stars
The Penguin Guide to Blues Recordings	2.5/4 stars
Rolling Stone	favorable

Fathers and Sons is the seventh studio album by the American blues musician Muddy Waters, released as a double LP by Chess Records in August 1969.

The album contains both studio and live recordings recorded in April 1969 in Chicago, Illinois, with an all-star band, including Michael Bloomfield and Paul Butterfield of the Paul Butterfield Blues Band, Donald "Duck" Dunn of Booker T. & the M.G.'s, Otis Spann, and Sam Lay.

The album was Waters's biggest mainstream success, reaching #70 on the Billboard 200, which was his only appearance in the top half of the chart. Waters would not make another appearance on the 200 until Hard Again in 1977.

== Background ==
According to Marshall Chess, Fathers and Sons came about when Mike Bloomfield said that he and Paul Butterfield wanted to do an album with Muddy Waters while in Chicago for a charity concert. Chess rounded up Donald "Duck" Dunn, Otis Spann, and Sam Lay for the studio sessions.

While some blues purists criticized Waters's "psychedelic" album Electric Mud, Fathers and Sons was received more favorably since it avoided psychedelia, instead showcasing his "classic" sound of the 1950s. In many ways, the album anticipated his later, critically acclaimed, albums produced by Johnny Winter.

== Recording and production ==
The studio disc of the album was recorded on April 21–23, 1969, at Ter Mar Studios. These sides were engineered by Ron Malo and featured rhythm guitarist Paul Asbell, who did not play on the live songs.

The live songs were recorded on April 24, 1969, at the Super Cosmic Joy-Scout Jamboree. These sides were engineered by Reice Hamel. Drummer Buddy Miles played on the second part of "Got My Mojo Working".

The producer on all sessions was Norman Dayron, who would go on to produce The London Howlin' Wolf Sessions in 1970, among other items.

== Artwork and design ==
The cover illustration for Fathers and Sons was created by Don Wilson and was based on Michelangelo's design on the Sistine Chapel. The original album's design was by Daily Planet and was packaged in a foldout sleeve. The 2001 MCA Records expanded reissue featured a reissued design by Mike Fink.

== Track listing ==
All songs written by McKinley Morganfield, except where indicated.

=== Vinyl version ===
Side A (studio)

1. "All Aboard" – 2:50
2. "Mean Disposition" – 5:42
3. "Blow Wind Blow" – 3:35
4. "Can't Lose What You Ain't Never Had" – 3:03
5. "Walkin' Thru The Park" – 3:07

Side B (studio)

1. "Forty Days and Forty Nights" (Bernard Roth) – 3:04
2. "Standin' Round Crying" – 4:01
3. "I'm Ready" (Willie Dixon) – 3:33
4. "Twenty Four Hours" (Eddie Boyd) – 4:46
5. "Sugar Sweet" (Mel London) – 2:16

Side C (live)

1. "Long Distance Call" – 6:35
2. "Baby, Please Don't Go" (Big Joe Williams) – 3:05
3. "Honey Bee" – 3:57

Side D (live)

1. "The Same Thing" (Dixon) – 6:00
2. "Got My Mojo Working, Part 1" (Preston Foster, Morganfield) – 3:39
3. "Got My Mojo Working, Part 2" (Foster, Morganfield) – 5:33

=== CD version ===
1. "All Aboard" – 2:52
2. "Mean Disposition" – 5:42
3. "Blow Wind Blow" – 3:38
4. "Can't Lose What You Ain't Never Had" – 3:06
5. "Walkin' Thru The Park" – 3:21
6. "Forty Days And Forty Nights" (Roth) – 3:08
7. "Standin' Round Cryin'" – 4:05
8. "I'm Ready" (Dixon) – 3:39
9. "Twenty Four Hours" (Boyd) – 4:48
10. "Sugar Sweet" – 2:18
11. "Country Boy"* – 3:20 (bonus track)
12. "I Love the Life I Live (I Live the Life I Love)"* (Dixon) – 2:45 (bonus track)
13. "Oh Yeah"* (Dixon) – 3:38 (bonus track)
14. "I Feel So Good"* (Big Bill Broonzy) – 3:00 (bonus track)
15. "Long Distance Call"+ – 6:37 (recorded live)
16. "Baby, Please Don't Go"+ (Williams) – 3:03 (recorded live)
17. "Honey Bee"+ – 3:56 (recorded live)
18. "The Same Thing"+ (Dixon) – 5:59 (recorded live)
19. "Got My Mojo Working, Part 1"+ (Foster, Morganfield) – 3:22 (recorded live)
20. "Got My Mojo Working, Part 2"+ (Foster, Morganfield) – 5:11 (recorded live)

== Personnel ==
- Muddy Waters – vocals, guitar
- Otis Spann – piano
- Michael Bloomfield – guitar
- Paul Butterfield – harmonica
- Donald Dunn – bass guitar
- Sam Lay – drums
- Paul Asbell – rhythm guitar
- Buddy Miles – drums on "Got My Mojo Working, Part 2"
- Jeff Carp – chromatic harmonica on "All Aboard"
- Phil Upchurch – bass guitar on "All Aboard"

Technical

- Norman Dayron – producer
- Ron Malo – engineer
- Reice Hamel – engineer in Live Sessions

== Release history ==
Region	Date	Label	Format	Catalog
United States	August 1969	Chess Records	mono double LP	LP-127
United States	August 1969	Chess Records	stereo double LP	LPS-127
United Kingdom	September 1969	Chess Records	double LP	CRL 4556
United States	1972	Chess Records	stereo double LP	2CH-50033
United States	1989	MCA/Chess Records	Cassette	CHC-92522
United States	1989	MCA/Chess Records	CD	CHD-92522
United States	October 30, 2001	MCA/Chess Records	extended CD	088 112 648-2
Japan	August 22, 2007	Chess Records	mini-LP CD	UICY-93295
