= What's Shakin' =

1966 Elektra compilation album with various artists

Compilation album by various artists
- Released: May 1966
- Recorded: 1964–1966
- Genre: Rock
- Length: 37:55
- Label: Elektra
- Producers: Paul Rothchild; Mark Abramson; Jac Holzman; Joe Boyd

The Lovin' Spoonful chronology
Daydream (1966)	What's Shakin' (1966)	What's Up, Tiger Lily? (1966)

Alternative cover
- 1993 CD cover

What's Shakin' is a compilation album released by Elektra Records in May 1966. It features the earliest studio recordings by the Lovin' Spoonful and the Paul Butterfield Blues Band, as well as the only released recordings by the ad hoc studio group Eric Clapton and the Powerhouse, until they were reissued years later.

== Background ==
During the 1950s and early 1960s, Elektra was one of the best-known American folk music record labels. However, by 1964–1965, it decided to test the waters with unknown electric, rock-oriented artists. Among the first such groups signed were the Paul Butterfield Blues Band from Chicago and Arthur Lee's Love from Los Angeles. Elektra wanted the Lovin' Spoonful, but they had already been signed to Kama Sutra Records in a previous production deal.

Elektra had released several successful "sampler" compilation albums, including The Blues Project in 1964 and Folksong '65. Some suggest What's Shakin' started as The Electric Blues Project, a follow-up to the 1964 compilation; however, Elektra founder Jac Holzman has stated "it was simply unreleased material that was available to us".

== Recording ==
Shortly after signing with Elektra, Paul Butterfield and band recorded an album's worth of songs which producer Paul A. Rothchild felt did not live up to the band's potential. Five of these tracks were chosen for What's Shakin' . Four songs, representing the earliest recordings by the Lovin' Spoonful, as well as one song each by Al Kooper and Tom Rush, were also included.

The only songs recorded specifically for the album were by a studio group dubbed Eric Clapton and the Powerhouse. Joe Boyd, who had been sent to London to open a field office for Elektra, was tasked with finding a suitable band for his first assignment. Boyd approached Manfred Mann singer Paul Jones and suggested that they put one together. Jones, who played harmonica and sang harmony, brought Manfred Mann bandmate Jack Bruce on bass, recruited the Spencer Davis Group's vocalist Steve Winwood and drummer Peter York, John Mayall & the Bluesbreakers's and former Yardbirds guitarist Eric Clapton, and Ben Palmer, a blues pianist friend of Jones and Clapton. Ginger Baker was suggested as the drummer, but either declined or was unavailable. The recording sessions took place in March 1966. Bruce later commented, "There were no thoughts of making a band at that time, but it probably helped to make the Cream thing happen." Within a month he, Baker, and Clapton began rehearsing and became Cream.

Four songs were recorded by the Powerhouse. Jones chose "I Want to Know" (his own composition, although credited to his wife, Sheila MacLeod) and Winwood selected "Steppin' Out". According to Boyd, Clapton wanted to record Albert King's "Crosscut Saw", but Boyd suggested "Standing at the Crossroads" (a version of Robert Johnson's "Cross Road Blues" recorded by Elmore James); Clapton then suggested Johnson's "Traveling Riverside Blues". Finally, a new arrangement of "Crossroads" was recorded using lyrics from both of the Johnson songs. A fourth song, described as a slow blues, was also recorded, but remains unreleased.

== Release ==
This was an album that had no organic reason for being. Absolutely none. It was material that was available to us, which we tried to put a wrapper around that was reasonably transparent. I don't think we tried to fool anybody. We were just taking advantage of what we could get.

— Elektra Records' founder Jac Holzman

Elektra issued What's Shakin' in stereo in May 1966, with a mono edition following in June. Billboard magazine announced the album's release in June and July 1966. In an August 13, 1966, interview, Elektra's Jac Holzman predicted that the album would soon enter the album charts. Instead, it became part of the underground music phenomenon. The album was first released in the UK in 1967 with the title Good Time Music and different cover art. However, it was soon replaced with the original title and art work.

After signing with Kama Sutra, the Lovin' Spoonful recorded a string of Top 40 hits. Their "Good Time Music" later became a charting single for the Beau Brummels. The Paul Butterfield Blues Band released several successful albums with Elektra, as did Tom Rush. Al Kooper later re-recorded "Can't Keep From Crying Sometimes" (as "I Can't Keep From Crying") with the Blues Project. "Crossroads" and "Steppin' Out" became part of Cream's repertoire. Both Cream and Blues Project later recorded versions of "Spoonful"; Ten Years After recorded three songs from What's Shakin for their debut album: "I Want to Know", "I Can't Keep from Crying, Sometimes", and "Spoonful". Robben Ford later recorded "Lovin' Cup" for his Supernatural album.

== Reissues ==
Most of the songs from What's Shakin' later were included on compilations and career retrospectives by Al Kooper, Eric Clapton, Steve Winwood, and John Sebastian/Lovin' Spoonful. In 1995, The Original Lost Elektra Sessions was released with recordings from the Paul Butterfield Blues Band's early sessions, except for "Off the Wall" and "One More Mile".

The album is currently available on compact disc, with comprehensive liner notes by Richie Unterberger.

== Critical reception ==
Professional ratings
Review scores
Source	Rating
AllMusic	3/5 stars

Writing for AllMusic decades after the original LP release, Unterberger gave What's Shakin' a rating of three out of five stars. He called it "an odd, erratic, but interesting anthology of rare performances recorded by Elektra in the mid-'60s". Unterberger noted that the Butterfield songs are in the same mold as those on The Paul Butterfield Blues Band debut album, but added that the Lovin' Spoonful's early rock/R&B-influenced contributions "frankly don't measure up to their [later] folk-rock".

== Track listing ==
=== Side one ===
No.	Title	Writer(s)	Artist	Length
1.	"Good Time Music"	John Sebastian	The Lovin' Spoonful	3:06
2.	"Almost Grown"	Chuck Berry	The Lovin' Spoonful	1:50
3.	"Spoonful"	Willie Dixon	The Paul Butterfield Blues Band	2:55
4.	"Off the Wall"	Walter Jacobs a.k.a. Little Walter	The Paul Butterfield Blues Band	2:02
5.	"Can't Keep from Crying Sometimes"	Al Kooper	Al Kooper	4:30
6.	"I Want to Know"	S. MacLeod	Eric Clapton and the Powerhouse	2:14
7.	"Crossroads"	Robert Johnson	Eric Clapton and the Powerhouse	2:32

=== Side two ===
No.	Title	Writer(s)	Artist	Length
1.	"Lovin' Cup"	Paul Butterfield	The Paul Butterfield Blues Band	2:35
2.	"Good Morning Little Schoolgirl"	Level, Love	The Paul Butterfield Blues Band	2:20
3.	"Steppin' Out"	Memphis Slim	Eric Clapton and the Powerhouse	3:12
4.	"I'm In Love Again"	Dave Bartholomew, Fats Domino	Tom Rush	2:04
5.	"Don't Bank on It Baby"	John Sebastian	The Lovin' Spoonful	1:52
6.	"Searchin'"	Jerry Leiber and Mike Stoller	The Lovin' Spoonful	3:13
7.	"One More Mile"	James Cotton	The Paul Butterfield Blues Band	3:30

== Charts ==
Weekly chart performance
Chart (1966)	Peak position
U.S. Cash Box Top 100 Albums	87
U.S. Record World LPs Coming Up	114
