= The Paul Butterfield Blues Band =

American blues rock band

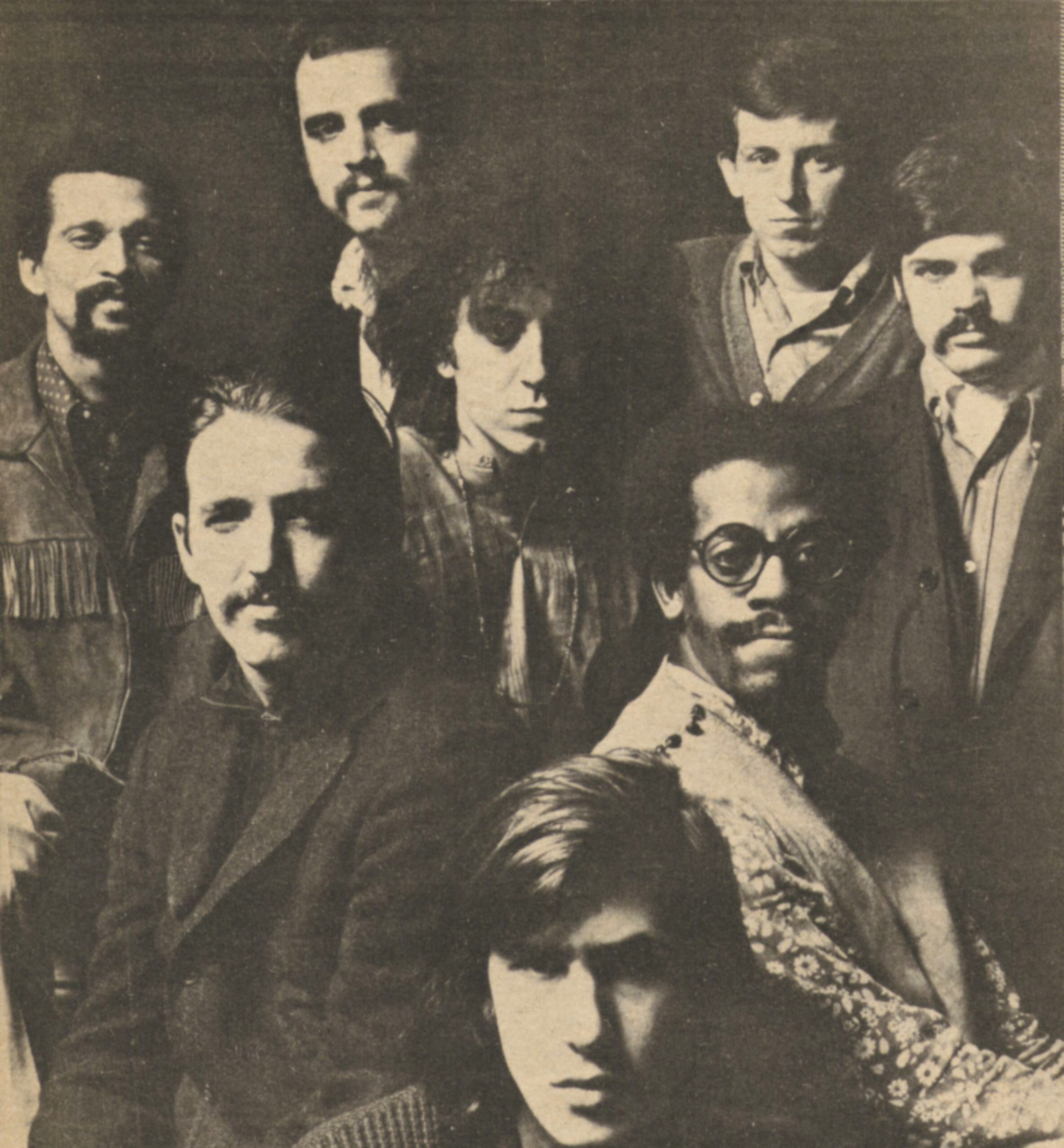
- The Paul Butterfield Blues Band, c. 1967. From left to right, Gene Dinwiddie, Paul Butterfield, Keith Johnson, Elvin Bishop, Mark Naftalin, Phillip Wilson, Charley 'Bugsy' Maugh, David Sanborn.

Background information
- Origin: Chicago, Illinois, U.S.
- Genres: Chicago blues; blues rock; soul blues
- Years active: 1963–1971
- Label: Elektra
- Past members: Paul Butterfield; Elvin Bishop; Jerome Arnold; Sam Lay; Mike Bloomfield; Mark Naftalin; Billy Davenport; Gene Dinwiddie; David Sanborn; Keith Johnson; Charley "Bugsy" Maugh; Phillip Wilson; Buzz Feiten; Rod Hicks; Steve Madaio; Ted Harris; Trevor Lawrence; Ralph Wash; George Davidson; Dennis Whitted

The Paul Butterfield Blues Band was an American blues and blues-rock band from Chicago. Formed in the summer of 1963, the group originally featured eponymous vocalist and harmonicist Paul Butterfield, guitarist Elvin Bishop, bassist Jerome Arnold, and drummer Sam Lay. The band added guitarist Mike Bloomfield and keyboardist Mark Naftalin before recording their self-titled debut album, which was released in October 1965. The founding sextet were inducted into the Rock and Roll Hall of Fame in 2015, along with Billy Davenport, their drummer on their second album, East-West.

== History ==
In the early 1960s, Butterfield met aspiring blues guitarist Elvin Bishop. Bishop recalled:

He [Butterfield] was playing more guitar than harp when I first met him. But in about six months he became serious about the harp, and he seemed to get about as good as he got in that six months. He was just a natural genius. This was in 1960 or 1961. By this time Butter had been hanging out in the ghetto for a couple of years, and he was part of the scene and getting accepted.

Eventually, Butterfield, on vocals and harmonica, and Bishop, accompanying him on guitar, were offered a regular gig at Big John's, a folk club in the Old Town district on Chicago's near North Side. With this booking, they persuaded bassist Jerome Arnold and drummer Sam Lay (both from Howlin' Wolf's touring band) to form a group with them in 1963. Their engagement at the club was highly successful and brought the group to the attention of record producer Paul A. Rothchild.

=== With Mike Bloomfield ===
During their engagement at Big John's, Butterfield met and occasionally sat in with guitarist Mike Bloomfield, who was also playing at the club. By chance, producer Rothchild witnessed one of their performances and was impressed by the chemistry between the two. He persuaded Butterfield to bring Bloomfield into the band, and they were signed to Elektra Records. Their first attempt to record an album, in December 1964, did not meet Rothchild's expectations, although an early version of "Born in Chicago", written by Gravenites, was included on the 1965 Elektra sampler Folksong '65 and created interest in the band. Additional early recordings were released on the Elektra compilation What's Shakin' in 1966 and The Original Lost Elektra Sessions in 1995.

To capture their sound better, Rothchild convinced Elektra president Jac Holzman to record a live album. In the spring of 1965, the Butterfield Blues Band was recorded at the Cafe Au Go Go in New York City. These recordings also failed to satisfy Rothchild, but the group's appearances at the club brought them to the attention of the East Coast music community. Rothchild persuaded Holzman to agree to a third attempt at recording an album.

In these recording sessions, Rothchild had assumed the role of group manager and used his folk contacts to secure the band more engagements outside of Chicago. At the last minute, the band was booked to perform at the Newport Folk Festival in July 1965. They were scheduled as the opening act the first night when the gates opened and again the next afternoon in an urban blues workshop at the festival. Despite limited exposure on the first night and a dismissive introduction the following day by the folklorist and blues researcher Alan Lomax, (Note: Albert Grossman, who had agreed to take over management of the band the night before, was incensed at Lomax's perceived insults, and an argument backstage led to an altercation between the two.) the band was able to attract an unusually large audience for a workshop performance. Maria Muldaur, with her husband Geoff, who later toured and recorded with Butterfield, recalled the group's performance as stunning; it was the first time that many of the mostly folk-music fans had heard a high-powered electric blues combo. Among those who took notice was festival regular Bob Dylan, who invited the band to back him for his first live electric performance. With little rehearsal, Dylan performed a short, four-song set the next day with Bloomfield, Arnold, and Lay (along with Al Kooper and Barry Goldberg). The performance was not well received by some and generated a controversy, but it was a watershed event and brought the band to the attention of a much larger audience.

The band added keyboardist Mark Naftalin, and its debut album, The Paul Butterfield Blues Band, was finally successfully recorded in mid-1965 and released in October of that year. The opening song, a newer recording of the previously released "Born in Chicago", is an upbeat blues rocker and set the tone for the album, which included a mix of blues standards, such as "Shake Your Moneymaker", "Blues with a Feeling", and "Look Over Yonders Wall", and compositions by the band. The album, described as a "hard-driving blues album that, in a word, rocked", reached number 123 in the Billboard 200 album chart in 1966, but its influence was felt beyond its sales figures.

Shortly after the album's release, Lay was hospitalised after contracting pleural effusion; he was replaced for one show by Billy Warren, who was then dismissed in favor of Billy Davenport, who joined in late December.

In July 1966, the sextet recorded their second album, East-West, which was released a month later. The album consists of more varied material, with the band's interpretations of blues (Robert Johnson's "Walkin' Blues"), rock (Michael Nesmith's "Mary, Mary"), R&B (Allen Toussaint's "Get Out of My Life, Woman"), and jazz selections (Nat Adderley's "Work Song"). East-West reached number 65 in the album chart.

The 13-minute instrumental track "East-West" incorporates Indian raga influences and some of the earliest jazz-fusion and blues rock excursions, with extended solos by Butterfield and guitarists Mike Bloomfield and Elvin Bishop. It has been described as "the first of its kind and ... the root from which the acid rock tradition emerged". Live versions of the song sometimes lasted nearly an hour, and performances at the San Francisco Fillmore Auditorium "were a huge influence on the city's jam bands". Bishop recalled, "Quicksilver, Big Brother, and the Dead – those guys were just chopping chords. They had been folk musicians and weren't particularly proficient playing electric guitar – [Bloomfield] could play all these scales and arpeggios and fast time-signatures ... He just destroyed them." Several live versions of "East-West" from this period were later released on East-West Live in 1996.

=== Later band ===
In February 1967, Bloomfield left the Butterfield Blues Band and moved to San Francisco, California, to form a new band called the Electric Flag.

By the time the group performed at the Monterey Pop Festival, Arnold had been replaced by Charley "Bugsy" Maugh, and the group had expanded with the addition of saxophonists Gene Dinwiddie and David Sanborn and trumpeter Keith Johnson.

The eight-piece lineup released the band's third album, The Resurrection of Pigboy Crabshaw in 1967. The album cut back on extended instrumental jams and went in a more rhythm and blues-influenced horn-driven direction, with songs such as Charles Brown's "Driftin' Blues" (retitled "Driftin' and Driftin'"), Otis Rush's "Double Trouble", and Junior Parker's "Driving Wheel". The Resurrection of Pigboy Crabshaw was Butterfield's highest-charting album, reaching number 52 on the album chart. Most of this lineup performed at the seminal Monterey Pop Festival on June 17, 1967. (Note: Billy Davenport played the drums, and Keith Johnson contributed trumpet in place of David Sanborn on saxophone. Former bandmate Mike Bloomfield also performed the same day at Monterey with his new group, Electric Flag.) Davenport retired shortly thereafter and was replaced by Phillip Wilson.

On its next album, In My Own Dream, released in 1968, the band continued to move away from its roots in Chicago blues towards a more soul-influenced, horn-based sound. With Butterfield singing only three songs, the album featured more band contributions. It reached number 79 in the Billboard album chart.

Bishop and Naftalin left shortly after the release of In My Own Dreams, with Howard "Buzz" Feiten brought in as their replacement. Early the next year, Maugh made way for Rod Hicks and Steve Madaio joined as a second trumpeter. By the summer, the group had also added keyboardist Ted Harris and third saxophonist Trevor Lawrence.

The Butterfield Blues Band was invited to perform at the Woodstock Festival on August 18, 1969. The band performed seven songs, and although its performance did not appear in the film Woodstock, one song, "Love March", was included on the album Woodstock: Music from the Original Soundtrack and More, released in 1970. In 2009, Butterfield was included in the expanded 40th Anniversary Edition Woodstock video, and an additional two songs appeared on the box set Woodstock: 40 Years On: Back to Yasgur's Farm.

The album Keep On Moving, with only Butterfield remaining from the original lineup, was released in 1969. It was produced by veteran R&B producer and songwriter Jerry Ragovoy, reportedly brought in by Elektra to turn out a "breakout commercial hit". The album was not embraced by critics or long-time fans; however, it reached number 102 in the Billboard album chart.

After the release of Keep On Moving, Feiten and Wilson were replaced by Ralph Wash and George Davidson, respectively, while Johnson also left. Late the following year, Harris left the band and Dennis Whitted took over from Davidson on drums.

A live double album by the Butterfield Blues Band, Live, was recorded March 21–22, 1970, at The Troubadour, in West Hollywood, California. By this time, the band included a four-piece horn section in what has been described as a "big-band Chicago blues with a jazz base". Live provides perhaps the best showcase for this unique "blues-jazz-rock-R&B hybrid sound".

Sometimes I Just Feel Like Smilin' was released in 1971, after which the group disbanded. In 1972, a retrospective of their career, Golden Butter: The Best of the Paul Butterfield Blues Band, was released by Elektra.

The Rock and Roll Hall of Fame inducted the Paul Butterfield Blues Band in 2015. The induction biography commented that "the Butterfield Band converted the country-blues purists and turned on the Fillmore generation to the pleasures of Muddy Waters, Howlin' Wolf, Little Walter, Willie Dixon and Elmore James".

Butterfield died in May 1987 due to an accidental drug overdose.

== Members ==
Image	Name	Years active	Instruments	Release contributions
	Paul Butterfield	1963–1971 (died in 1987)	lead and backing vocals; amplified harmonica; occasional flute, piano and guitar	all Paul Butterfield Blues Band releases
	Elvin Bishop	1963–1968	electric guitar; backing and lead vocals	all Paul Butterfield Blues Band releases from The Paul Butterfield Blues Band (1965) to In My Own Dream (1968), and from The Original Lost Elektra Sessions (1995) onwards
	Jerome Arnold	1963–1967	electric bass	The Paul Butterfield Blues Band (1965); East-West (1966); all Paul Butterfield Blues Band releases from The Original Lost Elektra Sessions (1995) onwards
	Sam Lay	1963–1965 (died in 2022)	drums; backing and lead vocals	The Paul Butterfield Blues Band (1965); The Original Lost Elektra Sessions (1995)
	Mike Bloomfield	1964–1967 (died in 1981)	electric guitar; keyboards and piano (early)	The Paul Butterfield Blues Band (1965); East-West (1966); all Paul Butterfield Blues Band releases from The Original Lost Elektra Sessions (1995) onwards
	Mark Naftalin	1965–1968	keyboards; piano	all Paul Butterfield Blues Band releases from The Paul Butterfield Blues Band (1965) to In My Own Dream (1968), and from The Original Lost Elektra Sessions (1995) onwards
	Billy Warren	1965	drums	none – one live performance only
	Billy Davenport	1965–1967 (died in 1999)	drums	East-West (1966); all Paul Butterfield Blues Band releases from Strawberry Jam (1995) onwards
	"Brother" Gene Dinwiddie	1967–1971 (died in 2002)	tenor and soprano saxophones; flute; percussion; backing and lead vocals	all Paul Butterfield Blues Band releases from The Resurrection of Pigboy Crabshaw (1967) to Sometimes I Just Feel Like Smilin' (1971); Strawberry Jam (1995) – three tracks only
	David Sanborn	1967–1971 (died in 2024)	alto saxophone; percussion	The Resurrection of Pigboy Crabshaw (1967); In My Own Dream (1968); Keep On Moving (1969); Strawberry Jam (1995) – one track only
	Keith Johnson	1967–1969	trumpet; percussion; piano	The Resurrection of Pigboy Crabshaw (1967); In My Own Dream (1968); Keep On Moving (1969); Strawberry Jam (1995) – three tracks only
	Charley "Bugsy" Maugh	1967–1969 (died in 2015)	bass; backing and lead vocals	The Resurrection of Pigboy Crabshaw (1967); In My Own Dream (1968); Strawberry Jam (1995) – three tracks only
	Phillip Wilson	1967–1970 (died in 1992)	drums; percussion; congas; backing and lead vocals	The Resurrection of Pigboy Crabshaw (1967); In My Own Dream (1968); Strawberry Jam (1995) – three tracks only
	Howard "Buzzy" Feiten	1968–1969	guitar; keyboards; piano; French horn; backing and lead vocals	Keep On Moving (1969)
	Rod Hicks	1969–1971	bass; fretless bass; double bass; backing and lead vocals	Keep On Moving (1969); Live (1970); Sometimes I Just Feel Like Smilin' (1971)
	Steve Madaio	1969–1971	trumpet; percussion; backing vocals	Keep On Moving (1969); Live (1970); Sometimes I Just Feel Like Smilin' (1971)
	Ted Harris	1969–1970 (died in 2005)	keyboards; piano	Keep On Moving (1969); Live (1970); Sometimes I Just Feel Like Smilin' (1971) – two tracks only
	Trevor Lawrence	1969–1971	baritone saxophone; percussion; backing vocals	Keep On Moving (1969); Live (1970); Sometimes I Just Feel Like Smilin' (1971)
	Ralph Wash	1969–1971 (died in 1996)	guitar; backing and lead vocals	Live (1970); Sometimes I Just Feel Like Smilin' (1971)
	George Davidson	1969–1970	drums	Live (1970); Sometimes I Just Feel Like Smilin' (1971) – two tracks only
	Dennis Whitted	1970–1971 (died in 1993)	drums; backing vocals	Sometimes I Just Feel Like Smilin' (1971)

== Lineups ==
Period	Members	Releases
Summer 1963 – late 1964	Paul Butterfield – vocals, harmonica; Elvin Bishop – guitar, vocals; Jerome Arnold – bass; Sam Lay – drums, vocals	none
Late 1964 – summer 1965	Paul Butterfield – vocals, harmonica; Elvin Bishop – guitar, vocals; Mike Bloomfield – guitar, keyboards; Jerome Arnold – bass; Sam Lay – drums, vocals	The Original Lost Elektra Sessions (1995)
Summer – November 1965	Paul Butterfield – vocals, harmonica; Elvin Bishop – guitar, vocals; Mike Bloomfield – guitar; Jerome Arnold – bass; Sam Lay – drums, vocals; Mark Naftalin – keyboards, piano	The Paul Butterfield Blues Band (1965)
December 1965	Paul Butterfield – vocals, harmonica; Elvin Bishop – guitar, vocals; Mike Bloomfield – guitar; Jerome Arnold – bass; Billy Warren – drums; Mark Naftalin – keyboards, piano	none
December 1965 – February 1967	Paul Butterfield – vocals, harmonica; Elvin Bishop – guitar, vocals; Mike Bloomfield – guitar; Jerome Arnold – bass; Billy Davenport – drums; Mark Naftalin – keyboards, piano	East-West (1966); Strawberry Jam (1995) – four tracks; East-West Live (1996); Got a Mind to Give Up Living (2016); Born in Chicago: Live 1966 (2018)
February – spring 1967	Paul Butterfield – vocals, harmonica; Elvin Bishop – guitar, vocals; Jerome Arnold – bass; Billy Davenport – drums; Mark Naftalin – keyboards, piano	Strawberry Jam (1995) – two tracks
Spring – summer 1967	Paul Butterfield – vocals, harmonica; Elvin Bishop – guitar, vocals; Bugsy Maugh – bass, vocals; Billy Davenport – drums; Mark Naftalin – keyboards, piano; Gene Dinwiddie – saxophone, flute, vocals; David Sanborn – saxophone; Keith Johnson – trumpet, piano	none
Summer 1967 – summer 1968	Paul Butterfield – vocals, harmonica; Elvin Bishop – guitar, vocals; Bugsy Maugh – bass, vocals; Phillip Wilson – drums, vocals; Mark Naftalin – keyboards, piano; Gene Dinwiddie – saxophone, flute, vocals; David Sanborn – saxophone; Keith Johnson – trumpet, piano	The Resurrection of Pigboy Crabshaw (1967); In My Own Dream (1968); Strawberry Jam (1995) – three tracks
Summer 1968 – early 1969	Paul Butterfield – vocals, harmonica; Buzz Feiten – guitar, keyboards, vocals; Bugsy Maugh – bass, vocals; Phillip Wilson – drums, vocals; Gene Dinwiddie – saxophone, flute, vocals; David Sanborn – saxophone; Keith Johnson – trumpet, piano	none
Early – summer 1969	Paul Butterfield – vocals, harmonica; Buzz Feiten – guitar, keyboards, vocals; Rod Hicks – bass, cello, vocals; Phillip Wilson – drums, vocals; Gene Dinwiddie – saxophone, flute, vocals; David Sanborn – saxophone; Keith Johnson – trumpet, piano; Steve Madaio – trumpet, backing vocals	none
Summer – late 1969	Paul Butterfield – vocals, harmonica; Buzz Feiten – guitar, keyboards, vocals; Rod Hicks – bass, cello, vocals; Phillip Wilson – drums, vocals; Ted Harris – keyboards, piano; Gene Dinwiddie – saxophone, flute, vocals; David Sanborn – saxophone; Trevor Lawrence – saxophone, backing vocals; Keith Johnson – trumpet, piano; Steve Madaio – trumpet, backing vocals	Keep On Moving (1969)
Late 1969 – late 1970	Paul Butterfield – vocals, harmonica; Ralph Wash – guitar, vocals; Rod Hicks – bass, cello, vocals; George Davidson – drums; Ted Harris – keyboards, piano; Gene Dinwiddie – saxophone, flute, vocals; David Sanborn – saxophone; Trevor Lawrence – saxophone, backing vocals; Steve Madaio – trumpet, backing vocals	Live (1970); Sometimes I Just Feel Like Smilin' (1971) – two tracks)
Late 1970 – late 1971	Paul Butterfield – vocals, harmonica; Ralph Wash – guitar, vocals; Rod Hicks – bass, cello, vocals; Dennis Whitted – drums, backing vocals; Gene Dinwiddie – saxophone, flute, vocals; David Sanborn – saxophone; Trevor Lawrence – saxophone, backing vocals; Steve Madaio – trumpet, backing vocals	Sometimes I Just Feel Like Smilin' (1971)

== Discography ==
=== Studio albums ===
- The Paul Butterfield Blues Band (1965) (peaked at number 123 on the Billboard 200 album chart)
- East-West (1966) (No. 65 on Billboard 200)
- The Resurrection of Pigboy Crabshaw (1967) (No. 52 on Billboard 200)
- In My Own Dream (1968) (No. 79 on Billboard 200)
- Keep On Moving (1969) (No. 102 on Billboard 200)
- Sometimes I Just Feel Like Smilin' (1971) (No. 124 on Billboard 200)

=== Live albums ===
- Live (1970) (No. 72 on Billboard 200)

=== Compilation albums ===
- The Best of The Paul Butterfield Blues Band/Golden Butter (1972) (No. 136 on Billboard 200)

== Sources ==
- Ellis III, Tom (Spring 1997). "Paul Butterfield: From Newport to Woodstock". Blues Access.com. 29.
- Erlewine, Michael (1996). "Paul Butterfield Blues Band". In Erlewine, Michael (ed.). All Music Guide to the Blues: The Experts' Guide to the Best Blues Recordings. All Music Guide to the Blues. San Francisco: Miller Freeman Books. ISBN 0-87930-424-3.
- Field, Kim (2000). Harmonicas, Harps, and Heavy Breathers: The Evolution of the People's Instrument. New York City: Cooper Square Press. ISBN 978-0-8154-1020-1.
- Houghton, Mick (2010). Becoming Elektra: True Story of Jac Holzman's Visionary Record Label. London: Jawbone Press. ISBN 978-1-906002-29-9.
- Marcus, Greil (2006). Like a Rolling Stone: Bob Dylan at the Crossroads. New York City: PublicAffairs. ISBN 978-1-58648-382-1.
- Perone, James (2005). Woodstock: An Encyclopedia of the Music and Art Fair. Santa Barbara, California: Greenwood Publishing Group. ISBN 978-0-313-33057-5.
- Rothchild, Paul (1995). The Original Lost Elektra Sessions (CD booklet). Paul Butterfield Blues Band. Los Angeles: Elektra Entertainment/Rhino Records. R2 73305.
- Tamarkin, Jeff (1996). "East-West". All Music Guide to the Blues. Miller Freeman Books. p. 42. ISBN 0-87930-424-3.
