= Tracy Nelson/Mother Earth =

1972 album by Mother Earth

Studio album by Mother Earth
- Released: 1972
- Genre: Blues, pop rock
- Length: 42:36
- Label: Reprise
- Producer: Travis Rivers

Mother Earth chronology
Bring Me Home (1971)	Tracy Nelson/Mother Earth (1972)	Poor Man's Paradise (1973)

Tracy Nelson/Mother Earth (also known as just Mother Earth) is an album that was released in early 1972 by the blues rock group Mother Earth. The band's fifth studio album, it was distributed by the label Reprise Records. The release's title reflects the growing separation between performer Tracy Nelson and the rest of the band, who had grown into something of a mere backing vehicle for Nelson.

Stylistically, the release features a laid-back, subdued sound in its rendering of blues music mixed with pop rock, with three cover versions of Bobby Charles' songs included. It's also notable for an early John Hiatt composition,"Thinking of You". Despite the tensions within the band, the album has received positive reviews from publications such as Allmusic. Critic Richie Unterberger stated that he found the release "a solid, if laid-back set of rock with strong country and soul flavorings, and a bit of gospel now and then", comparing its tracks to Janis Joplin's work.

== Track listing ==
1. "The Same Old Thing" (Jack Lee)
2. "I'm That Way" (Bobby Charles)
3. "Mother Earth (Provides for Me)" (Eric Kaz)
4. "Tennessee Blues" (Bobby Charles)
5. "I Want to Lay Down Beside You" (Tim Drummond)
6. "Someday My Love May Grow" (Eric Kaz)
7. "(Staying Home and Singing) Homemade Songs" (Bobby Charles)
8. "Thinking of You" (John Hiatt)
9. "The Memory of Your Smile" (Carter Stanley, a.k.a. Ruby Rakes)
10. "I Don't Do That Kind of Thing Anymore" (Tracy Nelson-Andy McMahon)

== Personnel ==
- Tracy Nelson, vocals
- John Cameron Andrews, electric and acoustic guitars
- Jack Lee, electric and acoustic guitars
- Andrew James McMahon, piano and organ
- Steve Mendel, bass
- Karl Himmel, drums

== See also ==
- 1972 in music
