= The Paul Butterfield Blues Band (album) =

Studio album by the Paul Butterfield Blues Band
- Released: October 1965
- Recorded: September 1965
- Genre: Blues
- Length: 38:15
- Label: Elektra
- Producers: Paul A. Rothchild, Mark Abramson

The Paul Butterfield Blues Band chronology
The Paul Butterfield Blues Band (1965)	East-West (1966)

Professional ratings
Review scores
Source	Rating
AllMusic	5/5 stars
The Penguin Guide to Blues Recordings	4/4 stars
Sputnikmusic	4.0/5

The Paul Butterfield Blues Band is the self-titled debut album by the American blues rock band of the same name, released in 1965 on Elektra Records. It peaked at number 123 on the Billboard albums chart. In 2012, the album was ranked number 468 on Rolling Stone's list of "The 500 Greatest Albums of All Time". It is ranked at number 11 on DownBeat's list of the top 50 blues albums.

== Recording and releases ==
In late 1964, Joe Boyd, an aspiring producer and friend of Elektra house producer Paul Rothchild, told Rothchild that the "best band in the world was on stage at a blues bar in Chicago". Rothchild took a plane to Chicago to see the Butterfield quartet, and later the same night went to a different club – again, at the suggestion of Joe Boyd – and saw guitarist Mike Bloomfield with a different band. According to Rothchild, it was at his impetus that Paul Butterfield hired Bloomfield as his second guitar alongside Elvin Bishop; Joe Boyd says that it was his idea. The Butterfield rhythm section of Jerome Arnold and Sam Lay had been hired away from Howlin' Wolf.

Sessions were arranged for December 1964, but these were abandoned for live recordings from the Cafe Au Go Go in New York City after the band's appearance at the Newport Folk Festival. The earlier studio recordings were eventually released on The Original Lost Elektra Sessions in 1995. Upon hearing the live tapes, Rothchild remained dissatisfied, and the band went into the studio in September 1965 in an attempt to record the album for the third time. The guitar solos were all played by Bloomfield, with Bishop relegated to rhythm guitar. Keyboardist Mark Naftalin was drafted in at the September sessions and asked to join the band by Butterfield, expanding it to a sextet.

The album presents band originals and songs in the style of electric Chicago blues. On October 29, 2001, a reissue of this album remastered by Bob Irwin at Sundazed Studios and coupled with East-West appeared on Rhino WEA UK for the European market.

== Track listing ==
Side one
No.	Title	Writer(s)	Length
1.	"Born in Chicago"	Nick Gravenites	2:55
2.	"Shake Your Money-Maker"	Elmore James	2:27
3.	"Blues with a Feeling"	Walter Jacobs	4:20
4.	"Thank You Mr. Poobah"	Mike Bloomfield, Paul Butterfield, Mark Naftalin	4:05
5.	"I Got My Mojo Working"	Preston Foster	3:30
6.	"Mellow Down Easy"	Willie Dixon	2:48

Side two
No.	Title	Writer(s)	Length
1.	"Screamin'"	Mike Bloomfield	4:30
2.	"Our Love Is Drifting"	Paul Butterfield, Elvin Bishop	3:25
3.	"Mystery Train"	Junior Parker, Sam Phillips	2:45
4.	"Last Night"	Walter Jacobs	4:15
5.	"Look Over Yonders Wall"	James Clark	2:23

== Personnel ==
The Paul Butterfield Blues Band

- Paul Butterfield – lead vocals (all but 4, 5, 7), harmonica
- Mike Bloomfield – lead guitar
- Elvin Bishop – rhythm guitar
- Jerome Arnold – bass guitar
- Sam Lay – drums, lead vocals (5)
- Mark Naftalin – organ (3, 4, 7–10)

Technical

- William S. Harvey – cover design
- Leonard Heicklen, William S. Harvey – cover photography
