= Billy Davenport =

American blues drummer

- Born: April 23, 1931; Chicago, Illinois, United States
- Died: December 24, 1999 (aged 68)
- Genres: Blues, jazz
- Occupation: Drummer
- Instrument: Drums
- Formerly of: Willie Dixon, Muddy Waters, Howlin' Wolf, Otis Rush, Paul Butterfield

Billy Davenport (April 23, 1931 – December 24, 1999) was an American drummer known for his work with blues musicians such as Willie Dixon, Muddy Waters, Howlin' Wolf, Otis Rush, and Paul Butterfield. He played on the Butterfield album East-West and retired from music briefly until 1972, and then again from 1974 to 1981.

Born in Chicago, Illinois, United States, Davenport died in December 1999. He was inducted posthumously into the Rock and Roll Hall of Fame in 2015 as an early member of the Butterfield Band.
