= Sam Lay =

American blues and R&B drummer and vocalist (1935–2022)

- Lay in 1965

Background information
- Born: Samuel Julian Lay; March 20, 1935; Birmingham, Alabama, U.S.
- Died: January 29, 2022 (aged 86) Chicago, Illinois, U.S.
- Genres: Chicago blues; jazz; rock
- Occupation: Musician
- Instruments: Drums; vocals
- Years active: 1957–2022
- Formerly of: The Paul Butterfield Blues Band
- Website: www.samlayinbluesland.com

Samuel Julian Lay (March 20, 1935 – January 29, 2022) was an American drummer and vocalist who performed from the late 1950s as a blues and R&B musician alongside Little Walter, Howlin' Wolf, Paul Butterfield, and many others. He was inducted into the Rock and Roll Hall of Fame in 2015.

== Background ==
Samuel Julian Lay was born in Birmingham, Alabama, on March 20, 1935.

== Career ==
He began his career in 1957, as the drummer for the Original Thunderbirds. He soon after became the drummer for the harmonica player Little Walter.

In 1960, he became the regular drummer for Muddy Waters, and remained in Waters's band until 1966. In that time he also began recording and performing with prominent blues musicians, including Willie Dixon, Howlin' Wolf, Eddie Taylor, John Lee Hooker, Junior Wells, Bo Diddley, Magic Sam, Jimmy Rogers, and Earl Hooker. The recordings Lay made during this time, along with Waters's album Fathers and Sons, recorded in 1969, are considered to be among the definitive works of Waters and Wolf.

In 1963, Lay joined the Paul Butterfield Blues Band, and recorded and toured extensively with them. Bob Dylan used Lay as his drummer when he introduced electric rock at the Newport Folk Festival in 1965. Lay also recorded on Dylan's track "Highway 61 Revisited", and may have provided the siren whistle Dylan famously uses on the track.

Sam Lay was used as a drummer for The Chambers Brothers at Newport. They had an early Drummer called Michael Konnic. It was around the time they went to the Newport festival, that they got into a dispute with him. For some reason Konnic wanted to fight with them and his elder brother nearly got involved. According to Joe Chambers, he said "We love you man. We want you to play drums." The brothers were backed by Sam Lay at Newport on their first night at the festival. George Chambers was impressed by the "big sound" of Lay and asked him to back the brothers on another set. One of the songs they performed, "I Got It", appeared on the Newport Folk Festival 1965 compilation LP, which was issued on the Vanguard label.

Lay's drumming can be heard on over 40 recordings for Chess Records, with many notable blues performers. He toured the major blues festivals in the US and Europe with the Chess Records All-Stars.

In the late 1980s Lay was inducted into the Blues Hall of Fame, in Memphis. He has also been inducted into the Jazz Hall of Fame, in Los Angeles, and the Rock n' Roll Hall of Fame, in Cleveland. He was nominated eight times for the coveted W. C. Handy Award for Best Instrumentalist, including a nomination in 2005.

Lay made two albums with his own band, released by Appaloosa Records and Evidence Records, and two recordings for Alligator Records with the Siegel-Schwall Band. His own album, Sam Lay in Bluesland, released in 1969 by Blue Thumb Records, was produced by Nick Gravenites.

He was nominated in 2000 for a Grammy Award for his performances on the CD Howlin' Wolf Tribute. He was honored by the Recording Academy in January 2002 with a Legends and Heroes Award for his significant musical contributions. He was prominently featured in the PBS television documentary History of the Blues, broadcast in seven episodes, produced by the Academy Award–winning director Martin Scorsese. Lay shot many home movies of fellow blues performers in small Chicago venues in the late 1950s and 1960s, parts of which were included in History of the Blues and the WTTW television production Record Row, by the filmmaker Michael MacAlpin.

In 2009, Lay worked alongside Johnnie Marshall. In 2014, filmmaker John Anderson made the feature film Sam Lay in Bluesland, a documentary detailing Lay's life.

Lay was inducted into the Rock and Roll Hall of Fame, as a member of the Paul Butterfield Blues Band, in 2015.

Lay died at a nursing facility in Chicago on January 29, 2022, at the age of 86.

== Selected discography ==
As a band leader

- Sam Lay in Bluesland (Blue Thumb Records, 1969 [BTS 14])

With Paul Butterfield

- The Paul Butterfield Blues Band (Elektra, 1965)
- What's Shakin' (Elektra, 1966)

With Carey Bell

- Heartaches and Pain (Delmark, 1977 [1994])

With Bob Dylan

- Highway 61 Revisited (Columbia, 1965)
- The Bootleg Series Vol. 12: The Cutting Edge 1965–1966 (Columbia [2015])

With Lightnin' Hopkins

- Live at Newport (Vanguard, 1965 [2002])

With Howlin' Wolf

- Howlin' Wolf (Chess, 1959–62 [1962])
- The Real Folk Blues (Chess, 1956–64 [1965])

With Magic Sam

- Magic Sam Live (Delmark, 1969 [1981])

With Muddy Waters

- Fathers and Sons (Chess, 1969)

With the Siegel–Schwall Band

- The Siegel–Schwall Reunion Concert (Alligator, 1988)
- Flash forward (Alligator, 2005)
