= Mike Bloomfield =

American blues guitarist (1943–1981)

- Bloomfield c. 1968

Background information
- Born: Michael Bernard Bloomfield; July 28, 1943; Chicago, Illinois, U.S.
- Died: February 15, 1981 (aged 37) San Francisco, California, U.S.
- Genres: Blues; blues rock; Chicago blues; psychedelic rock
- Occupations: Musician; songwriter
- Instruments: Guitar; vocals
- Years active: 1959–1981
- Formerly of: The Paul Butterfield Blues Band The Electric Flag
- Spouse: Susan Smith (m. 1962)
- Website: mikebloomfield.com

Michael Bernard Bloomfield (July 28, 1943 – February 15, 1981) was an American blues guitarist and composer. Born in Chicago, he became one of the first popular music stars of the 1960s to earn his reputation almost entirely on his instrumental prowess, as he rarely sang before 1969. Respected for his guitar playing, Bloomfield knew and played with many of Chicago's blues musicians before achieving his own fame and was instrumental in popularizing blues music in the mid-1960s. In 1965, he played on Bob Dylan's Highway 61 Revisited, including the single "Like a Rolling Stone", and performed with Dylan at that year's Newport Folk Festival.

Bloomfield was ranked No. 22 on Rolling Stone's list of "100 Greatest Guitarists of All Time" in 2003 and No. 42 by the same magazine in 2011. He was inducted into the Blues Hall of Fame in 2012 and, as a member of the Paul Butterfield Blues Band, was inducted into the Rock and Roll Hall of Fame in 2015.

== Early years ==
Bloomfield was born in Chicago into a wealthy Jewish family. Bloomfield's father, Harold, was born there in 1914. Harold's father, Samuel Bloomfield, started Bloomfield Industries in the early 1930s. After Samuel's death, Harold and his brother, Daniel, inherited the company. Bloomfield's mother, Dorothy Klein, was born in Chicago in 1918 and married Harold in 1940. She came from an artistic, musical family, and worked as an actress and model before marrying.

Bloomfield's family lived in various locations around Chicago before settling at 424 West Melrose Street on the North Side. When he was twelve his family moved to suburban Glencoe, where he attended New Trier High School for two years. During this time, he began playing in local bands, then put together one called the Hurricanes, named after Ohio rock band Johnny and the Hurricanes. New Trier expelled Bloomfield after his band performed a raucous rock and roll song at a 1959 school gathering. He attended Cornwall Academy in Massachusetts for one year and then returned to Chicago, where he spent his last year of education at a local Central YMCA High School.

Bloomfield had attended a 1957 Chicago performance by blues singer Josh White, and began spending time in Chicago's South Side blues clubs and playing guitar with such black bluesmen as Sleepy John Estes, Yank Rachell, and Little Brother Montgomery. He first sat in with a black blues band in 1959, when he performed with Luther "Guitar Junior" Johnson at a Chicago club called the Place. He performed with Howlin' Wolf, Muddy Waters, and many other Chicago blues performers during the early 1960s. In 1962 he married Susan Smith.

Writing in 2001, keyboardist, songwriter and record producer Al Kooper said:

[Bloomfield] had a certain innate talent for playing the guitar that was instantly obvious to his mentors. They knew this was not just another white boy; this was someone who truly understood what the blues were all about. Among his early supporters were B.B. King, Muddy Waters, Bob Dylan and Buddy Guy. Michael used to say, "It's a natural. Black people suffer externally in this country. Jewish people suffer internally. The suffering's the mutual fulcrum for the blues."

== The Butterfield Blues Band (1965–1967) ==
In the early 1960s he met harmonica player and singer Paul Butterfield and guitarist Elvin Bishop, with whom he would later play in the Paul Butterfield Blues Band. He also began friendships and professional associations with fellow Chicagoan Nick Gravenites and Bronx-born record producer Norman Dayron, who was attending the University of Chicago. He developed a friendship with blues singer Big Joe Williams. In 1963 Bloomfield and his two friends George Mitchell and Pete Welding ran a weekly blues showcase at the Fickle Pickle. He subsequently built up his reputation in two Chicago clubs, Big John's and Magoo's. With help from his friend Joel Harlib, a Chicago photographer who became Bloomfield's de facto manager, he became a Columbia Records recording artist. In early 1964 Harlib took an audition tape by Bloomfield to Columbia producer and talent scout John Hammond, who signed him to Columbia's Epic Records label.

Bloomfield recorded a few sessions for Columbia in 1964 that remained unreleased until after his death. In early 1965 he joined the Paul Butterfield Blues Band, which included Elvin Bishop and keyboardist Mark Naftalin, along with drummer Sam Lay and bassist Jerome Arnold, who had previously worked in Howlin' Wolf's band. Elektra Records producer Paul Rothchild recorded the band in spring 1965, but the majority of the tracks were not released until the 1990s. However, one of the tracks Rothchild recorded during his first pass at producing the group, a Nick Gravenites song titled "Born in Chicago", was included on the Elektra album Folksong '65, which sold two hundred thousand copies when it was released in September 1965. "Born in Chicago" became an underground hit for the Butterfield Band. Their debut album, The Paul Butterfield Blues Band, was recorded in September and released the following month.

In June 1965, Bloomfield recorded with Bob Dylan, whom he had met in 1963 at a Chicago club called the Bear. The club was bankrolled by future Dylan and Butterfield manager Albert Grossman, who would play a major part in Bloomfield's career. Bloomfield's Telecaster guitar licks were featured on Dylan's "Like a Rolling Stone", a single produced by Columbia Record's Tom Wilson. Bloomfield would play on most of the tracks on Dylan's 1965 Highway 61 Revisited album, and he appeared onstage with Dylan in July at the Newport Folk Festival, where Dylan used Bloomfield and the Butterfield Band—minus Paul Butterfield—along with keyboardists Al Kooper and Barry Goldberg. The show marked Dylan's first use of an electric band in a live performance, and Bloomfield's playing on the songwriter's "Maggie's Farm" is considered a landmark electric-guitar performance. After the Newport Folk Festival ended, Bloomfield helped Dylan complete the sessions for Highway 61 Revisited, and Dylan asked Bloomfield to join his touring band. Bloomfield demurred, preferring to continue playing with the Butterfield Band.

When Sam Lay fell ill after a series of dates in November 1965, the Butterfield Band brought Chicago-born drummer Billy Davenport into the group. During the first part of 1966, the band played in California, and they recorded their second album, East-West, that summer. The record's title track found the band exploring modal music, and it was based upon a song Gravenites and Bloomfield had been playing since 1965, "It's About Time".

Bloomfield played on recording sessions between 1965 and 1967. His guitar playing had a huge impact on San Francisco Bay Area musicians after playing with the Butterfield band at Bill Graham's Fillmore in March 1966, San Francisco's Avalon Ballroom and also in the Los Angeles area due to the storied two-week run at the Golden Bear in Huntington Beach. He became a mentor and inspiration for many guitarists, especially in the SF Bay Area. He did a 1965 date with Peter, Paul and Mary that resulted in a song called "The King of Names", and he recorded in 1966 with pop group Chicago Loop, whose "When She Wants Good Lovin' (My Baby Comes to Me)" made Billboard Magazine's chart that year. He also played guitar on recordings by Chuck Berry, Mitch Ryder and James Cotton.

== The Electric Flag (1967–1968) ==
Bloomfield tired of the Butterfield Band's rigorous touring schedule, relocated to San Francisco, and sought to create his own group. He formed the short-lived Electric Flag in 1967, with two longtime Chicago collaborators, Barry Goldberg and vocalist Nick Gravenites. The band featured a horn section. The band's rhythm section was composed of bassist Harvey Brooks and drummer Buddy Miles. Miles had previously played in Wilson Pickett's touring band, while Brooks had performed with Al Kooper in bands in New York City, and had played with both Kooper and Bloomfield on Bob Dylan's Highway 61 Revisited. The group's first effort was the soundtrack for director-producer Roger Corman's 1967 movie The Trip, which was recorded in the spring of that year.

The Electric Flag debuted at the 1967 Monterey Pop Festival and issued an album, A Long Time Comin', in April 1968 on Columbia Records. Critics complimented the group's distinctive, intriguing sound but found the record itself somewhat uneven. By that time, however, the band was already disintegrating, with rivalries between members, shortsighted management, and heroin abuse all taking their toll. Shortly after the release of that album, Bloomfield left the band, with Gravenites, Goldberg, and bassist Harvey Brooks following.

== Work with Al Kooper ==
Bloomfield also made an impact through his work with Al Kooper, who had played with Bloomfield on Dylan's "Like a Rolling Stone". Kooper had become an A&R man for Columbia Records, and Bloomfield and Kooper had played piano [probably just Kooper on piano] on Moby Grape's 1968 Grape Jam, an instrumental album that had been packaged with the group's Wow collection.

"Why not do an entire jam album together?" Kooper remembered in 1998, writing the booklet notes for the Bloomfield anthology Don't Say That I Ain't Your Man: Essential Blues, 1964–1969. "At the time, most jazz albums were made using this modus operandi: pick a leader or two co-leaders, hire appropriate sidemen, pick some tunes, make some up and record an entire album on the fly in one or two days. Why not try and legitimize rock by adhering to these standards? In addition, as a fan, I was dissatisfied with Bloomfield's recorded studio output up until then. It seemed that his studio work was inhibited and reined in, compared to his incendiary live performances. Could I put him in a studio setting where he could feel free to just burn like he did in live performances?"

The result was Super Session, a jam album that spotlighted Bloomfield's guitar skills on one side. Bloomfield, who suffered from insomnia, left the sessions after the first day. Guitarist Stephen Stills completed the album with Kooper. It received excellent reviews and became the best-selling album of Bloomfield's career. Its success led to a live sequel, The Live Adventures of Mike Bloomfield and Al Kooper, recorded over three nights at Fillmore West in September 1968.

== Solo work ==
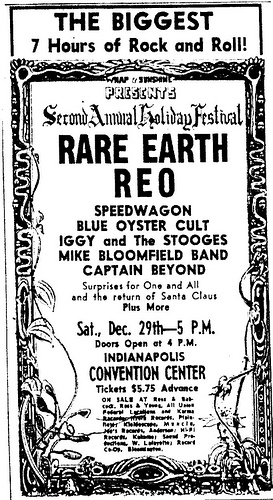
An advertisement concert featuring the Mike Bloomfield Band for a 1973 show in Indianapolis.

Bloomfield continued with solo, session and back-up work from 1968 to 1980. He played guitar on Mother Earth's cover of Memphis Slim's "Mother Earth", a track from their 1968 Living with the Animals album, and on two albums by Texas-born soul singer Wayne Talbert. With Mark Naftalin, he produced the 1968 sessions for James Cotton's 1968 album Cotton in Your Ears. He released his first solo album, It's Not Killing Me, in 1969. Bloomfield also helped Janis Joplin assemble her Kozmic Blues Band (for the album I Got Dem Ol' Kozmic Blues, Again Mama!) in 1969, co-wrote "Work Me, Lord" for the album, and played the guitar solo on Joplin's blues composition "One Good Man". Columbia released another 1969 album, a live concert jam, Live at Bill Graham's Fillmore West, including Mark Naftalin, former Electric Flag bandmate Marcus Doubleday and Snooky Flowers, and a guest appearance by Taj Mahal. In the same year he reunited with Paul Butterfield and Sam Lay for the Chess Records album Fathers and Sons, featuring Muddy Waters and pianist Otis Spann. Bloomfield composed and recorded the soundtrack for the film Medium Cool, directed by his second cousin, Haskell Wexler. The film includes footage shot in Chicago during the 1968 Democratic National Convention. With Nick Gravenites, he produced blues guitarist Otis Rush's 1969 album Mourning in the Morning, recorded at FAME Studios in Muscle Shoals, Alabama with a band that included keyboardists Mark Naftalin and Barry Beckett, along with guitarist Duane Allman.

During 1970 Bloomfield gave up playing because of his heroin addiction:

...and I put the guitar down – didn't touch it. Shooting junk made everything else unimportant, null and void, nolo contendere. My playing fell apart. I just didn't want to play.

He recorded his second solo album, Try It Before You Buy It, in 1973. Columbia rejected it; the complete version of the record would not appear until 1990. Also in 1973, he cut Triumvirate with Dr. John and guitarist and singer John Hammond Jr. In 1973 he teamed up with Mark Naftalin, at a studio in Sausalito, to produce a one-off live album, Live at the Record Plant 1973. In 1974, he rejoined the Electric Flag for an album titled The Band Kept Playing. In 1975 he recorded an album with the group KGB. The group's name is an acronym of the initials of singer and songwriter Ray Kennedy, Barry Goldberg and Bloomfield. The band also included Ric Grech and drummer Carmine Appice. Grech and Bloomfield quit shortly after its release. As the record hit stores in 1976, Bloomfield told journalists that the group had been an ill-conceived moneymaking project. The album was not well received by critics, but it did contain the standout track "Sail On, Sailor". Its authorship was credited to "Wilson-Kennedy", and had a bluesy, darker feel, along with Ray Kennedy's original cocaine-related lyrics. In the same year, he performed with John Cale on Cale's soundtrack for the film Caged Heat. In 1976 he recorded an instructional album for guitarists, If You Love These Blues, Play 'Em as You Please, which was financed through Guitar Player magazine.

In the 1970s Bloomfield played in local San Francisco Bay area clubs, including the Keystone Korner, and sat in with other bands. In 1977, Bloomfield was selected by Andy Warhol to do the soundtrack for the pop artist's last film, Andy Warhol's Bad (also known as BAD). An unreleased single, "Andy's Bad", was also produced for the project. During 1979–1981 he performed often with the King Perkoff Band, sometimes introducing them as the "Michael Bloomfield and Friends" outfit. Bloomfield recorded "Hustlin' Queen", written by John Isabeau and Perkoff in 1979. He toured Italy and Sweden with guitarist Woody Harris and cellist Maggie Edmondson in the summer of 1980. He sat in with Bob Dylan at San Francisco's Warfield Theatre on November 15, 1980. Bloomfield played on Dylan's "Like a Rolling Stone" and "The Groom's Still Waiting at the Altar". He continued to play live dates, with his performance at San Francisco State College on February 7, 1981, being his penultimate appearance. His final performance was at Mission Ranch, Carmel, CA, approximately 48 hours before his death.

Bloomfield came from a wealthy family, and received annual income from a trust created by his paternal grandfather, which gave him $50,000 each year.

== Death ==
Bloomfield died in San Francisco on February 15, 1981. He was found seated behind the wheel of his car, with all four doors locked. According to police, an empty Valium bottle was found on the car seat, but no suicide note was found. The medical examiner who performed the autopsy ruled the death accidental overdose, due to cocaine and methamphetamine poisoning. Bloomfield's last album, Cruisin' for a Bruisin', was released the day his death was announced. His remains are interred in a crypt at Hillside Memorial Park Cemetery, in Culver City, near Los Angeles.

== Style ==
Bloomfield's musical influences include Scotty Moore, Chuck Berry, Little Richard, B.B. King, Big Joe Williams, Otis Rush, Albert King, Freddie King and Ray Charles.

Bloomfield originally used a Fender Telecaster, though he had also used a Fender Duo-Sonic while recording for Columbia following his 1964 signing to the label. During his tenure with the Butterfield Blues Band, he used that Telecaster on the first Butterfield album and on their earliest tours in the fall of 1965. By November he had swapped that guitar for International Submarine Band guitarist John Nuese’s 1954 Gibson Les Paul Goldtop, acquired in Boston and used for some of the East-West sessions.

In 1967, Bloomfield swapped the Goldtop for guitar repairman/musician Dan Erlewine's 1959 Les Paul Standard and $100. The Standard had proven unpopular in the late 1950s because it was deemed too heavy and expensive by rock and roll guitarists. Gibson discontinued manufacturing the model in 1960. Bloomfield used the Standard in the Electric Flag and on the Super Session album and concerts. He later switched between it and the Telecaster, but his use of the Les Paul inspired other guitarists to use the model and spurred Gibson to reintroduce the Standard in 1968.

Bloomfield eventually lost the guitar in Canada when a club owner kept two he had left behind as partial compensation after Bloomfield cut short a round of appearances. He had been booked at the Cave in Vancouver, from Tue. Nov. 12th, 1974, for five days, until Sat. the 16th. The band played the first night but the next day Bloomfield boarded a plane and flew home to San Francisco with virtually no notice to the club, hotel, or band members; his friend Mark Naftalin found a note on a torn piece of paper in the hotel room that read, "bye bye, sorry".

Unlike contemporaries such as Jimi Hendrix and Jeff Beck, Bloomfield rarely experimented with feedback and distortion, preferring a loud yet clean, almost chiming sound, with a healthy amount of reverb and vibrato; this approach would strongly influence Jerry Garcia, who segued from a career in acoustic-based music to electric rock at the height of the Butterfield Band's influence in 1965. One of his amplifiers of choice was a 1965 Fender Twin Reverb. His solos, like those of most blues guitarists, were based in the minor pentatonic scale and the blues scale. However, he liberally used chromatic notes within the pentatonic framework, and integrated Indian and Eastern influences in his solos.

Gibson has since released a Michael Bloomfield Les Paul, replicating his 1959 Standard—in recognition of his impact on the electric blues, his role in the revived production of the guitar, and his influence on many other guitarists. Because the actual guitar had been unaccounted for so many years, Gibson relied on hundreds of photographs provided by Bloomfield's family to reproduce it. The model comes in two configurations—a Vintage Original Specifications (VOS), modified by Bloomfield's mismatched volume and tone control knobs, missing toggle switch cover, and kidney-shaped tuners replacing the Gibson original, and a faithful process-aged reproduction of the guitar as it was when Bloomfield last played it, complete with the finish smudge below the bridge and various nicks and smudges elsewhere on the body.

== Selected discography ==
=== The Paul Butterfield Blues Band ===
- The Paul Butterfield Blues Band (1965)
- East-West (1966)
- The Original Lost Elektra Sessions (unreleased recordings from 1965)
- East–West Live (three live versions of the track "East–West", recorded 1966–1967)

=== The Electric Flag ===
- The Trip (1967)
- A Long Time Comin' (1968)
- The Band Kept Playing (1974)
- Groovin' Is Easy (Released 2002)

=== Solo ===
- It's Not Killing Me (1969)
- Try It Before You Buy It (1973) (Not released until 1990. Additional recordings from these sessions were released on "Bloomfield: A Retrospective" in 1983)
- If You Love These Blues, Play 'Em as You Please (1976; reissued on CD with Bloomfield-Harris)
- Andy's Bad (1977; unreleased title soundtrack to Andy Warhol's Bad)
- Analine (1977)
- I'm with You Always (Recorded 1977)
- Michael Bloomfield (1978)
- Count Talent and the Originals (1978)
- Between a Hard Place and the Ground (1979)
- Bloomfield-Harris (1979)
- Cruisin' for a Bruisin' (1981)

=== Collaborations ===
- Blueskvarter (recorded 1964, released 2007), many Swedish CDs, recordings on Swedish radio. Bloomfield plays guitar with Little Brother Montgomery, Sunnyland Slim, Yank Rachell, Eddie Boyd and others.
- Super Session, Bloomfield, Kooper and Stills (1968). This album has been remastered, with new editions featuring several Bloomfield performances not included on the original album, including "Blues for Nothing" and "Fat Gray Cloud".
- The Live Adventures of Mike Bloomfield and Al Kooper (1968)
- Fillmore East: Al Kooper and Mike Bloomfield – The Lost Concert Tapes 12/13/68 (recorded 1968, released 2003)
- Two Jews Blues (1969), with Barry Goldberg (uncredited because of contractual constraints)
- Fathers and Sons (1969), with Muddy Waters, Otis Spann, Paul Butterfield, Donald Dunn, Sam Lay, Paul Asbell, Buddy Miles, Jeff Carp, & Phil Upchurch. Part live, part studio recordings.
- My Labors (1969), with Nick Gravenites
- Live at Bill Graham's Fillmore West (1969), with Nick Gravenites, Taj Mahal, Mark Naftalin. Some of the performances at the same concerts that yielded this album were included on My Labors. Those performances, except for "Winter Country Blues", are now part Live at Bill Graham's Fillmore West 1969, released in 2009 and credited to Michael Bloomfield with Nick Gravenites and Friends.
- Medium Cool (1969), original film soundtrack featuring Bloomfield and others
- Steelyard Blues (1973), original film soundtrack, with Nick Gravenites and others
- Mill Valley Bunch – Casting Pearls (1973), with Bill Vitt, Nick Gravenites and others
- Triumvirate (1973), with John Hammond and Dr. John
- KGB (1976), Ray Kennedy (vocals), Barry Goldberg (keyboards), Mike Bloomfield (guitar), Ric Grech (bass), Carmine Appice (drums)

=== Selected session work ===
- So Many Roads – John P. Hammond (1965)
- Highway 61 Revisited – Bob Dylan (1965)
- The Peter, Paul and Mary Album – Peter, Paul and Mary (1965)
- Fresh Berry's – Chuck Berry (1965)
- Chicago Loop (1966)
- Cherry Red – Eddie "Cleanhead" Vinson (BluesWay, 1967)
- "Carry On"/"Ronnie Siegel from Avenue L" [45rpm single] – Barry Goldberg, with Frank Zappa – guitar, produced by Tom Wilson
- Grape Jam – Moby Grape (1968) – played piano
- Living with the Animals – Mother Earth (1968) (credited as "Makal Blumfeld" due to contractual constraints)
- Dues to Pay – Wayne Talbert & the Melting Pot (1968)
- Lord Have Mercy on My Funky Soul – Wayne Talbert (1969)
- Fathers and Sons – Muddy Waters (1969)
- I Got Dem Ol' Kozmic Blues Again Mama! – Janis Joplin (1969)
- Weeds – Brewer & Shipley (1969)
- Moogie Woogie – The Zeet Band (1970) (credited as "Fastfingers" Finkelstein)
- Sam Lay in Bluesland – Sam Lay (1970)
- Gandharva – Beaver & Krause (1971)
- Brand New – Woody Herman and His Orchestra (1971)

=== Posthumous releases ===
- Living in the Fast Lane (1981)
- Bloomfield: A Retrospective (1983)
- I'm with You Always (Live 1977 recordings from McCabe's Guitar Shop, Santa Monica, CA)
- Between the Hard Place and the Ground (Different from the original 1970s LP; containing further selections from McCabe's Guitar Shop)
- Don't Say That I Ain't Your Man: Essential Blues, 1964–1969, an anthology that includes five songs from Bloomfield's original 1964 Columbia sessions.
- Live at the Old Waldorf (Recorded live in 1976 and 1977 by producer Norman Dayron at the Old Waldorf nightclub)
- Barry Goldberg & Friends – Live (Features Bloomfield on guitar on most tracks)
- Michael Bloomfield, Harvey Mandel, Barry Goldberg & Friends (with Eddie Hoh on drums) – Solid Blues (1995, St.Clair Entertainment Group)
- The Holy Kingdom: Music of the Gospel (1998) Bloomfield performed two songs: "Wings of an Angel" and "You Must Have Seen Jesus". Other artists on the album included the Five Blind Boys of Alabama, The Cavaliers, and The Swan Silvertones.
- If You Love These Blues by Wolkin & Keenom (Miller Freeman Books, 2000) contains a CD of 1964 recordings made by Norman Dayron
- From His Head to His Heart to His Hands: An Audio-Visual Scrapbook (2013); a Columbia Legacy career retrospective, produced by Al Kooper, including tapes from Bloomfield's original audition for John Hammond at Columbia Records in 1964, previously unissued live performances, and a DVD that includes the documentary film Sweet Blues: A Film About Mike Bloomfield, directed by Bob Sarles and produced and edited by Bob Sarles and Christina Keating. The film premiered at the Mill Valley Film Festival in October 2013.

== Sources ==
- Michael Bloomfield – Me and Big Joe, Re/Search Publications, 1st edition 1980, ISBN 0-940642-00-X. Last éd. V/Search, December 1999, ISBN 978-1889307053
- Jan Mark Wolkin & Bill Keenom - Michael Bloomfield – If You Love These Blues: An Oral History Backbeat Books, 1st edition September 2000 – ISBN 978-0-87930-617-5 (with CD of unreleased music – early recordings made by Norman Dayron )
- Ken Brooks – The Adventures of Mike Bloomfield and Al Kooper with Paul Butterfield and David Clayton Thomas Agenda Ltd, February 1999, ISBN 978-1-899882-90-8
- Al Kooper – Backstage Passes: Rock 'N' Roll Life in the Sixties – Stein & Day Pub (1st edition February 1977) ISBN 978-0-8128-2171-0
- Al Kooper – Backstage Passes and Backstabbing Bastards: Memoirs of a Rock 'N' Roll Survivor Billboard Books (Updated Edition – September 1998) ISBN 978-0-8230-8257-5
- Al Kooper – Backstage Passes and Backstabbing Bastards – Hal Leonard Corporation, new edition February 2008, ISBN 978-0-87930-922-0
- Ed Ward – Michael Bloomfield, The rise and fall of an American guitar hero, Cherry Lane Books (1983), ISBN 978-0-89524-157-3
- Ed Ward – Michael Bloomfield, The rise and fall of an American guitar hero, Multiprises, LLC (updated edition – 2016), ISBN 978-1-61373-328-8 (print) ISBN 978-1-61373-329-5 (PDF edition) ISBN 978-1-61373-331-8 (epub) ISBN 978-1-61373-330-1 (Kindle)
- David Dann – Guitar King: Michael Bloomfield's Life in the Blues, University of Texas Press (2019), ISBN 978-1-4773-1877-5 (print) ISBN 978-1-4773-1893-5 (ebook)
