= Jerome Arnold =

American bassist (born 1936)

- Birth name: Romeo Maurice Arnold
- Born: November 26, 1936 (age 88); Chicago, Illinois, U.S.
- Genres: Chicago blues; blues-rock
- Occupation: Musician
- Instrument: Bass
- Formerly of: The Paul Butterfield Blues Band
- Relatives: Billy Boy Arnold (brother)

Romeo Maurice "Jerome" Arnold (born November 26, 1936) is an American bassist, known for his work with Howlin' Wolf, and the Paul Butterfield Blues Band in the 1960s.

Born in Chicago, Illinois, Arnold was an original member of the Butterfield band, he was subsequently inducted into the Rock and Roll Hall of Fame in 2015.

His playing appears on the albums The Paul Butterfield Blues Band and East-West. He was a member of the Butterfield Band at the Newport Folk Festival in 1965, and not only appeared with the band there, but was among the musicians who supported Bob Dylan on the Newport Folk Festival stage for Dylan's controversial amplified instrument performance at that Festival.

Jerome Arnold is a younger brother of Billy Boy Arnold, as is harmonicist Augustus "Gus" Arnold (who around 1969 changed his name to "Julio Finn"). He also appears on Billy Boy Arnold's 1965 Prestige LP, More Blues on the South Side.

== Selective discography ==
With Howlin' Wolf

- The Real Folk Blues (Chess, recorded 1956–65, released 1965)

With Billy Boy Arnold

- More Blues on the South Side (Prestige, 1965)

With The Paul Butterfield Blues Band

- The Paul Butterfield Blues Band (Elektra, 1965)
- East-West (Elektra, 1966)
- Festival – The Newport Folk Festival 1965 (Vanguard, 1967) (one live track: "Mellow Down Easy")

With Bob Dylan

- No Direction Home: The Soundtrack (Columbia, 2005) (one track: "Maggie's Farm" (live at the Newport Folk Festival, 1965)

== Filmography ==
- The Other Side of the Mirror: Bob Dylan at the Newport Folk Festival (2007) (Arnold plays on one song from 1965: "Maggie's Farm". Al Kooper plays bass on "Like a Rolling Stone")
