= Paul Butterfield =

American blues harmonica player (1942–1987)

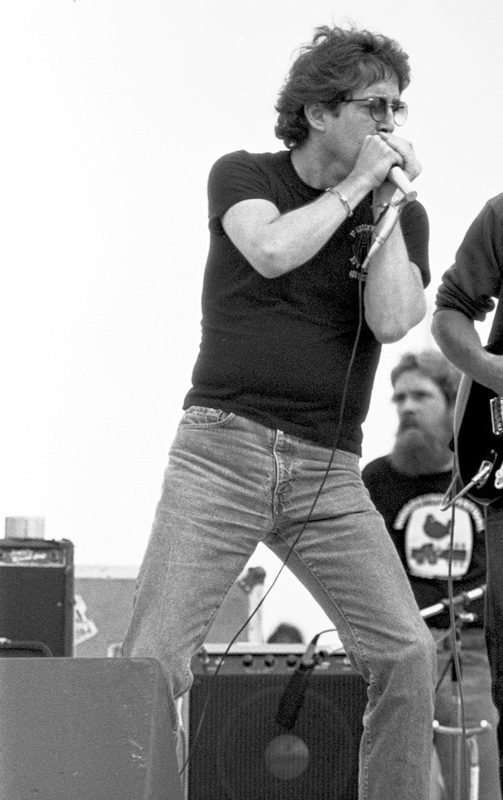
- Butterfield in 1979

Background information
- Born: Paul Vaughn Butterfield; December 17, 1942; Chicago, Illinois, U.S.
- Died: May 4, 1987 (aged 44) Los Angeles, California, U.S.
- Genres: Blues; blues rock
- Occupation: Musician
- Instruments: Harmonica; vocals
- Years active: 1963–1987
- Labels: Elektra; Bearsville; Amherst
- Formerly of: The Paul Butterfield Blues Band

Paul Vaughn Butterfield (December 17, 1942 – May 4, 1987) was an American blues harmonica player, singer, and bandleader. After early training as a classical flautist, he developed an interest in blues harmonica. He explored the blues scene in his native Chicago, where he met Muddy Waters and other blues greats, who provided encouragement and opportunities for him to join in jam sessions. He soon began performing with fellow blues enthusiasts Nick Gravenites and Elvin Bishop.

In 1963, he formed the Paul Butterfield Blues Band, which recorded several successful albums and was popular on the late-1960s concert and festival circuit, with performances at the Fillmore West in San Francisco, the Fillmore East in New York City, the Monterey Pop Festival, and Woodstock. The band was known for combining electric Chicago blues with a rock urgency. and for their pioneering jazz fusion performances and recordings. The band was also among the first racially integrated blues groups. After the breakup of the group in 1971, Butterfield continued to tour and record with the band Paul Butterfield's Better Days, with his mentor Muddy Waters, and with members of the roots-rock group the Band. While still recording and performing, Butterfield died in 1987 at age 44 of an accidental drug overdose.

Music critics have acknowledged his development of an original approach that places him among the best-known blues harp players. In 2006, he was inducted into the Blues Hall of Fame. Butterfield and the early members of the Paul Butterfield Blues Band were inducted into the Rock and Roll Hall of Fame in 2015. Both panels noted his harmonica skills and his contributions to bringing blues music to a younger and broader audience.

== Career ==
Paul Vaughn Butterfield was born on December 17, 1942, in Chicago and raised in the city's Hyde Park neighborhood. The son of a lawyer and a painter, he attended the University of Chicago Laboratory Schools, a private school associated with the University of Chicago. Exposed to music at an early age, he studied classical flute with Walfrid Kujala, of the Chicago Symphony Orchestra. Butterfield was also athletic and was offered a track scholarship to Brown University. However, a knee injury and a growing interest in blues music sent him in a different direction. He met guitarist and singer songwriter Nick Gravenites, who shared an interest in authentic blues music. By the late 1950s, they were visiting blues clubs in Chicago, where musicians such as Muddy Waters, Howlin' Wolf, Little Walter, and Otis Rush encouraged them and occasionally let them sit in on jam sessions. The pair were soon performing as Nick and Paul in college-area coffee houses.

In the early 1960s, Butterfield met aspiring blues guitarist Elvin Bishop. Bishop recalled:

He [Butterfield] was playing more guitar than harp when I first met him. But in about six months he became serious about the harp, and he seemed to get about as good as he got in that six months. He was just a natural genius. This was in 1960 or 1961. By this time Butter had been hanging out in the ghetto for a couple of years, and he was part of the scene and getting accepted.

Eventually, Butterfield, on vocals and harmonica, and Bishop, accompanying him on guitar, were offered a regular gig at Big John's, a folk club in the Old Town district on Chicago's near North Side. With this booking, they persuaded bassist Jerome Arnold and drummer Sam Lay (both from Howlin' Wolf's touring band) to form a group with them in 1963. Their engagement at the club was highly successful and brought the group to the attention of record producer Paul A. Rothchild.

=== Paul Butterfield Blues Band ===
During their engagement at Big John's, Butterfield met and occasionally sat in with guitarist Mike Bloomfield, who was also playing at the club. By chance, producer Rothchild witnessed one of their performances and was impressed by the chemistry between the two. He persuaded Butterfield to bring Bloomfield into the band, and they were signed to Elektra Records. Their first attempt to record an album, in December 1964, did not meet Rothchild's expectations. To capture their sound better, Rothchild convinced Elektra president Jac Holzman to record a live album. In the spring of 1965, the Butterfield Blues Band was recorded at the Cafe Au Go Go in New York City. These recordings also failed to satisfy Rothchild, but the group's appearances at the club brought them to the attention of the East Coast music community. Rothchild persuaded Holzman to agree to a third attempt at recording an album., securing the band more engagements outside of Chicago. At the last minute, the band was booked to perform at the Newport Folk Festival in July 1965. Maria Muldaur, with her husband Geoff, who later toured and recorded with Butterfield, recalled the group's performance as stunning; it was the first time that many of the mostly folk-music fans had heard a high-powered electric blues combo. Among those who took notice was festival regular Bob Dylan, who invited the band to back him for his first live electric performance. With little rehearsal, Dylan performed a short, four-song set the next day with Bloomfield, Arnold, and Lay (along with Al Kooper and Barry Goldberg). The performance was not well received by some and generated controversy, but it was a watershed event and brought the band to the attention of a much larger audience.

The band's debut album, The Paul Butterfield Blues Band, was released in 1965, reaching number 123 in the Billboard 200 album chart. On March 28, 1966, Butterfield appeared on the CBS game show To Tell the Truth. At the end of his segment, he performed "Born in Chicago" with the house band. In August 1966, the band released their second album, East-West, which reached number 65 in the album chart.

In England in November 1966, Butterfield recorded several songs with John Mayall & the Bluesbreakers, who had recently finished the album A Hard Road. Butterfield and Mayall contributed vocals, and Butterfield's Chicago-style blues harp was featured. Four songs were released in the UK on a 45-rpm EP, John Mayall's Bluesbreakers with Paul Butterfield, in January 1967. (Note: Presumably because of licensing restrictions, the EP was marked "For sale in the U.K. only", but it soon found its way to some specialty record retailers in the U.S. The songs were later included as bonus tracks on the 2003 expanded two-CD reissue of A Hard Road, with most of Peter Green's recordings with Mayall.)

The Butterfield Blues Band changed its lineup, with Arnold and Davenport leaving the band, and Bloomfield going on to form his own group, Electric Flag. The band added bassist Bugsy Maugh, drummer Phillip Wilson, and saxophonists David Sanborn and Gene Dinwiddie. This lineup recorded the band's third album, The Resurrection of Pigboy Crabshaw, in 1967. It was Butterfield's highest-charting album, reaching number 52 on the album chart. Most of this lineup performed at the seminal Monterey Pop Festival on June 17, 1967. (Note: Billy Davenport played the drums, and Keith Johnson contributed trumpet in place of David Sanborn on saxophone. Former bandmate Mike Bloomfield also performed the same day at Monterey with his new group, Electric Flag.)

The band's next album, In My Own Dream, released in 1968, continued to move away from the band's Chicago blues roots towards a more soul-influenced, horn-based sound, with Butterfield singing only three songs. It reached number 79 in the Billboard album chart. By the end of 1968, both Bishop and Naftalin had left the band. In April 1969, Butterfield took part in a concert at Chicago's Auditorium Theater and a subsequent recording session organized by record producer Norman Dayron, featuring Muddy Waters backed by Otis Spann, Mike Bloomfield, Sam Lay, Donald "Duck" Dunn, and Buddy Miles. Such Waters warhorses as "Forty Days and Forty Nights", "I'm Ready", "Baby, Please Don't Go", and "Got My Mojo Working" were recorded and later released on the album Fathers and Sons. Waters commented, "We did a lot of the things over we did with Little Walter and Jimmy Rogers and Elgin Evans on drums [an early configuration of Waters's band] ... It's about as close as I've been [to that feel] since I first recorded it". To one reviewer, these recordings represent Paul Butterfield's best performances.

The Butterfield Blues Band was invited to perform at the Woodstock Festival on August 18, 1969. The band performed seven songs, and although its performance did not appear in the film Woodstock, one song, "Love March", was included on the album Woodstock: Music from the Original Soundtrack and More, released in 1970. In 2009, Butterfield was included in the expanded 40th Anniversary Edition Woodstock video, and an additional two songs appeared on the box set Woodstock: 40 Years On: Back to Yasgur's Farm.

The album Keep On Moving, with only Butterfield remaining from the original lineup, was released in 1969. It was produced by veteran R&B producer and songwriter Jerry Ragovoy, reportedly brought in by Elektra to turn out a "breakout commercial hit". The album was not embraced by critics or long-time fans. It reached number 102 in the Billboard album chart.

A live double album by the Butterfield Blues Band, Live, was recorded March 21–22, 1970, at The Troubadour, in West Hollywood, California. By this time, the band included a four-piece horn section in what has been described as a "big-band Chicago blues with a jazz base". After the release of another soul-influenced album, Sometimes I Just Feel Like Smilin' in 1971, the Paul Butterfield Blues Band disbanded. In 1972, a retrospective of their career, Golden Butter: The Best of the Paul Butterfield Blues Band, was released by Elektra.

=== Better Days and solo ===
After the breakup of the Butterfield Blues Band and no longer under contract with Elektra, Butterfield retreated to Woodstock, New York, where he eventually formed his next band, Paul Butterfield's Better Days, with drummer Chris Parker, guitarist Amos Garrett, singer Geoff Muldaur, pianist Ronnie Barron and bassist Billy Rich. In 1972–1973, the group recorded the albums Paul Butterfield's Better Days and It All Comes Back, released by Albert Grossman's Bearsville Records. The albums reflected the influence of the participants and explored more roots- and folk-based styles. Although without an easily defined commercial style, both reached the album chart. The band did not last to record a third studio album, but its album Live at Winterland Ballroom, recorded in 1973, was released in 1999.

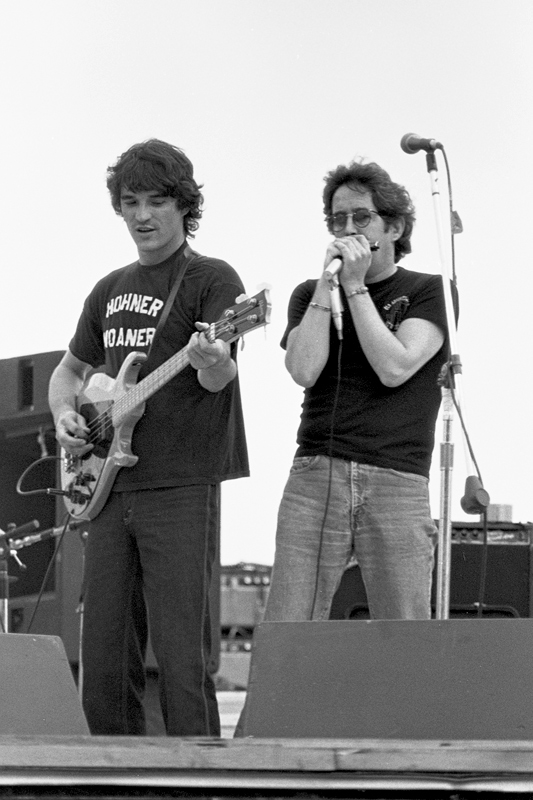
With Rick Danko (left) on bass guitar at Woodstock Reunion 1979

Butterfield next pursued a solo career and appeared as a sideman in several different musical settings. In 1975, he again joined Muddy Waters to record Waters's last album for Chess Records, The Muddy Waters Woodstock Album. The album was recorded at Levon Helm's Woodstock studio with Garth Hudson and members of Waters's touring band. In 1976, Butterfield performed at the Band's final concert, "The Last Waltz", accompanying the Band on the song "Mystery Train" and backing Muddy Waters on "Mannish Boy". Butterfield kept up his association with former members of the Band, touring and recording with Levon Helm and the RCO All Stars in 1977 and touring with Rick Danko in 1979. A 1984 live performance with Danko and Richard Manuel was recorded and released as Live at the Lonestar in 2011.

As a solo act with backing musicians, Butterfield continued to tour and recorded Put It in Your Ear in 1976 and North South in 1981, with strings, synthesizers, and funk arrangements. In 1986, he released his final studio album, The Legendary Paul Butterfield Rides Again, which was an attempt at a comeback with an updated rock sound. On April 15, 1987, he participated in the concert "B.B. King & Friends", with Eric Clapton, Etta James, Albert King, Stevie Ray Vaughan, and others.

== Legacy ==
Aside from "rank[ing] among the most influential harp players in the Blues", Butterfield has also been seen as pointing blues-based music in new, innovative directions. AllMusic critic Steve Huey commented,

It's impossible to overestimate the importance of the doors Butterfield opened: before he came to prominence, white American musicians treated the blues with cautious respect, afraid of coming off as inauthentic. Not only did Butterfield clear the way for white musicians to build upon blues tradition (instead of merely replicating it), but his storming sound was a major catalyst in bringing electric Chicago blues to white audiences who'd previously considered acoustic Delta blues the only really genuine article.

In 2006, Butterfield was inducted into the Blues Foundation's Blues Hall of Fame, which noted that "the albums released by the Butterfield Blues Band brought Chicago Blues to a generation of Rock fans during the 1960s and paved the way for late 1960s electric groups like Cream". The Rock and Roll Hall of Fame inducted the Paul Butterfield Blues Band in 2015. The induction biography commented that "the Butterfield Band converted the country-blues purists and turned on the Fillmore generation to the pleasures of Muddy Waters, Howlin' Wolf, Little Walter, Willie Dixon and Elmore James".

In 2017, a documentary titled Horn from the Heart: the Paul Butterfield Story premiered at the Newport Beach Film Festival. Directed by John Anderson and produced by Sandra Warren, it won the Outstanding Achievement Award in Filmmaking: Editing. In October 2018, the documentary was released nationally in select US theaters. It has received critical acclaim, including being named a New York Times Critic's Pick, as well as features in Rolling Stone, and The Wall Street Journal.

== Harmonica style ==
Like many Chicago blues harp players, Butterfield approached the instrument like a horn, preferring single notes to chords, and used it for soloing. His style has been described as "always intense, understated, concise, and serious", and he was "known for purity and intensity of his tone, his sustained breath control, and his unique ability to bend notes to his will". In his choice of notes he has been compared to Big Walter Horton, but he was never seen as an imitator of any particular harp player. (Note: Compare Butterfield's reading of "Off the Wall" from What's Shakin' or "Everything Going to Be Alright" from Live to Little Walter's originals.) Rather, he developed "a style original and powerful enough to place him in the pantheon of true blues greats".

Butterfield played Hohner harmonicas (and endorsed them). He preferred the diatonic ten-hole Marine Band model. He wrote a harmonica instruction book, Paul Butterfield Teaches Blues Harmonica Master Class, a few years before his death (it was not published until 1997). In it, he explains various techniques, demonstrated on an accompanying CD. Butterfield played mainly in cross-harp, or second position. Reportedly left-handed, he held the harmonica in a manner opposite that of a right-handed player, i.e., in his right hand, upside down (with the low notes to the right), using his left hand for muting effects. (Note: Erlewine wrote that he held the harmonica in his left hand, with the low notes to the left, but this is contradicted by a photo on the front cover of Butterfield's instructional book and his filmed performance at Monterey Pop, both clearly showing him holding it in his right hand and using his left hand for muting.)

Also like other electric Chicago blues harp players, Butterfield frequently used amplification to achieve his sound. He has been associated with a Shure 545 Unidyne microphone, although producer Rothchild noted that around the time of a 1965 recording session, Butterfield favored an Altec harp microphone run through an early model Fender tweed amplifier. Beginning with album The Resurrection of Pigboy Crabshaw, he used an acoustic harmonica style, following his shift to a more R&B-based approach.

== Personal life ==
By all accounts, Paul Butterfield was absorbed in his music. According to his brother Peter,

He listened to records and went places, but he also spent an awful lot of time, by himself, playing [harmonica]. He'd play outdoors. There's a place called the Point in Hyde Park [Chicago], a promontory of land that sticks out into Lake Michigan, and I can remember him out there for hours playing. He was just playing all the time ... It was a very solitary effort. It was all internal, like he had a particular sound he wanted to get and he just worked to get it.

Producer Norman Dayron recalled the young Butterfield as "very quiet and defensive and hard-edged. He was this tough Irish Catholic, kind of a hard guy. He would walk around in black shirts and sunglasses, dark shades and dark jackets ... Paul was hard to be friends with." Although they later became close, Michael Bloomfield commented on his first impressions of Butterfield: "He was a bad guy. He carried pistols. He was down there on the South Side, holding his own. I was scared to death of that cat". Writer and AllMusic founder Michael Erlewine, who knew Butterfield early in his recording career, described him as "always intense, somewhat remote, and even, on occasion, downright unfriendly". He remembered Butterfield as "not much interested in other people".

By 1971, Butterfield had purchased his first house, in rural Woodstock, New York, and began enjoying family life with his second wife, Kathy Peterson, and their infant son, Lee. According to Maria Muldaur, she and her husband were frequent dinner guests, which usually involved sitting around a piano and singing songs. She doubted her abilities, but "it was Butter that [sic] first encouraged me to let loose and just sing the blues [and] not to worry about singing pretty or hitting all the right notes ... He loosened all the levels of self-consciousness and doubt out of me ... And he'll forever live in my heart for that and for respecting me as a fellow musician."

== Death ==
Beginning in 1980, Butterfield underwent several surgical procedures to relieve his peritonitis, a serious and painful inflammation of the intestines. Although strongly opposed to heroin as a bandleader, he developed an addiction to it, which, according to Steve Huey in AllMusic's Butterfield biography, led to "speculation that he was trying to ease his peritonitis symptoms". The financial strain of supporting his drug habit was bankrupting him, and the deaths of his friend and one-time musical partner Mike Bloomfield, and manager Albert Grossman had shaken him. On May 4, 1987, at age 44, Butterfield died at his apartment in the North Hollywood district of Los Angeles. An autopsy by the county coroner concluded that he was the victim of an accidental drug overdose, with "significant levels of morphine (heroin), ... codeine, the tranquilizer Librium and a trace of alcohol."

By the time of his death, Butterfield was out of the commercial mainstream. Although for some, he was very much the blues man, Maria Muldaur commented "he had the whole sensibility and musicality and approach down pat ... He just went for it and took it all in, and he embodied the essence of what the blues was all about. Unfortunately, he lived that way a little too much."

== Discography ==
In 1964, Butterfield began his association with Elektra Records and eventually recorded seven albums for the label. After the break up of the Butterfield Blues Band in 1971, he recorded four albums for manager Albert Grossman's Bearsville Records – two with Paul Butterfield's Better Days and two solo. His last solo album was released by Amherst Records. After his death in 1987, his former record companies released a number of live albums and compilations.

=== Studio albums ===
==== The Butterfield Blues Band ====
- The Paul Butterfield Blues Band (1965) (peaked at number 123 on the Billboard 200 album chart)
- East-West (1966) (No. 65 on Billboard 200)
- The Resurrection of Pigboy Crabshaw (1967) (No. 52 on Billboard 200)
- In My Own Dream (1968) (No. 79 on Billboard 200)
- Keep On Moving (1969) (No. 102 on Billboard 200)
- Sometimes I Just Feel Like Smilin' (1971) (No. 124 on Billboard 200)

==== Paul Butterfield's Better Days ====
- Better Days (1973) (No. 145 on Billboard 200)
- It All Comes Back (1973) (No. 156 on Billboard 200)

==== Paul Butterfield ====
- Put It in Your Ear (1976)
- North–South (1981)
- The Legendary Paul Butterfield Rides Again (1986)

=== Live albums ===
All by the Paul Butterfield Blues Band, except as noted.

- Live (1970)[2LP] – reissued 2005 on CD with bonus tracks (Billboard 200 No. 72)
- Strawberry Jam (1996) – rec. 1966–68
- East-West Live (1996) – rec. 1966–67
- Live at Unicorn Coffee House – rec. 1966. released with several titles and dates, bootleg.
- Paul Butterfield's Better Days, Live at Winterland Ballroom (1999) – rec. 1973
- Paul Butterfield Band, Rockpalast: Blues Rock Legends, Vol. 2 (2008) – rec. 1978
- Rick Danko, Richard Manuel & Paul Butterfield, Live at the Lone Star, (2011) – rec. 1984
- Live in White Lake, N.Y. 8/18/69 (2015) – released as part of The Complete Albums 1965–1980
- Live at Woodstock (2020)[2LP]

=== Butterfield compilation albums ===
- Golden Butter: The Best of the Paul Butterfield Blues Band (1972)[2LP] – Billboard 200 No. 136
- The Original Lost Elektra Sessions (1995) – rec. 1964
- An Anthology: The Elektra Years (1997)[2CD]
- Paul Butterfield's Better Days, Paul Butterfield's Better Days: Bearsville Anthology (2000)
- Hi-Five: The Paul Butterfield Blues Band (2006) – EP

=== Compilation albums and videos with various artists ===
- Folksong '65 (1965)
- What's Shakin' (1966)
- Festival (1967 film, including 1965 appearance with Dylan)
- You Are What You Eat (1968 film soundtrack)
- Woodstock: Music from the Original Soundtrack and More (1970, recorded 1969)
- Woodstock 2 (1971, recorded 1969)
- An Offer You Can't Refuse (1972, recorded 1963)
- Woodstock '79 (1991 video, filmed 1979)
- Woodstock: Three Days of Peace and Music (1994, recorded 1969)
- The Monterey International Pop Festival June 16–17–18 30th Anniversary Box Set (1997, recorded 1967)
- The Complete Monterey Pop Festival (2002 video, filmed 1967)
- Woodstock: 40 Years On: Back to Yasgur's Farm (2009, recorded 1969)
- Woodstock: 40th Anniversary Ultimate Collector's Edition (2009 video, filmed 1969)

=== As accompanist ===
- The Peter, Paul and Mary Album (1966), Peter, Paul and Mary, "The King of Names" with Butterfield, Bloomfield, and Naftalin
- John Mayall's Bluesbreakers with Paul Butterfield (1967 EP), John Mayall & the Bluesbreakers
- Blues at Midnight (released with several titles and dates), Jimi Hendrix, B.B. King, and others (bootleg of jam recorded 1968)
- Fathers and Sons (1969, reissued 2001 with bonus tracks), Muddy Waters
- Give It Up (1972), Bonnie Raitt
- 2nd Right, 3rd Row (1972), Eric Von Schmidt
- Steelyard Blues (1973 film soundtrack), Mike Bloomfield, Nick Gravenites, Maria Muldaur, and others
- That's Enough for Me (1973), Peter Yarrow
- The Muddy Waters Woodstock Album (1975), Muddy Waters
- Levon Helm & the RCO All-Stars (1977)
- Already Free (1977), Nick Jameson
- The Last Waltz (1978), the Band
- Elizabeth Barraclough (1978), Elizabeth Barraclough
- Hi (1979), Elizabeth Barraclough
- Down by Law (1985), Deadline
- B.B. King & Friends (released with various titles and dates), B.B King, Eric Clapton, Stevie Ray Vaughan, and others (bootleg video of television special filmed 1987)
- Heart Attack (1990, recorded 1986), Little Mike & the Tornados (Note: A review of Heart Attack states "four cuts feature Paul Butterfield on harp (believed to be his last recordings).")

=== Tribute albums ===
- A Tribute to Paul Butterfield, Robben Ford and the Ford Blues Band (2001)
- The Butterfield/Bloomfield Concert, the Ford Blues Band, with Robben Ford and Chris Cain (2006)

== Notes ==
Footnotes

Citations

References

- Barrett, David (2016). Harmonica Essentials. Mel Bay Publications. ISBN 978-1619116887.
- Dicaire, David (2001). More Blues Singers: Biographies of 50 Artists from the Later 20th Century. Jefferson, North Carolina: McFarland & Co. ISBN 978-0-7864-1035-4.
- Ellis III, Tom (Spring 1997). "Paul Butterfield: From Newport to Woodstock". Blues Access.com. 29. Archived from the original on July 3, 1997.
- Erlewine, Michael (1996). "Paul Butterfield Blues Band". In Erlewine, Michael (ed.). All Music Guide to the Blues: The Experts' Guide to the Best Blues Recordings. All Music Guide to the Blues. San Francisco: Miller Freeman Books. ISBN 0-87930-424-3.
- Field, Kim (2000). Harmonicas, Harps, and Heavy Breathers: The Evolution of the People's Instrument. New York City: Cooper Square Press. ISBN 978-0-8154-1020-1.
- Gioia, Ted (2008). Delta Blues (Norton Paperback 2009 ed.). New York City: W. W. Norton. ISBN 978-0-393-33750-1.
- Gordon, Robert (2002). Can't Be Satisfied: The Life and Times of Muddy Waters. New York City: Little, Brown. ISBN 0-316-32849-9.
- Herzhaft, Gerard (1992). "Paul Butterfield". Encyclopedia of the Blues. Fayetteville, Arkansas: University of Arkansas Press. ISBN 1-55728-252-8.
- Houghton, Mick (2010). Becoming Elektra: True Story of Jac Holzman's Visionary Record Label. London: Jawbone Press. ISBN 978-1-906002-29-9.
- Marcus, Greil (2006). Like a Rolling Stone: Bob Dylan at the Crossroads. New York City: PublicAffairs. ISBN 978-1-58648-382-1.
- Milward, John (2013). Crossroads: How the Blues Shaped Rock 'n' Roll (and Rock Saved the Blues). Northeastern University Press. ISBN 978-1-55553-744-9.
- Perone, James (2005). Woodstock: An Encyclopedia of the Music and Art Fair. Santa Barbara, California: Greenwood Publishing Group. ISBN 978-0-313-33057-5.
- Rothchild, Paul (1995). The Original Lost Elektra Sessions (CD booklet). Paul Butterfield Blues Band. Los Angeles: Elektra Entertainment/Rhino Records. R2 73305.
- Schinder, Scott (2003). A Hard Road (expanded edition) (CD booklet). John Mayall & the Bluesbreakers. New York City: Deram Records. B0001083-02.
- Shadwick, Keith (2007). "Paul Butterfield". The Encyclopedia of Jazz & Blues. London: Quantum Publishing. ISBN 978-0-681-08644-9.
- Tamarkin, Jeff (1996). "East-West". All Music Guide to the Blues. Miller Freeman Books. p. 42. ISBN 0-87930-424-3.
- Ward, Ed (2016). Michael Bloomfield: The Rise and Fall of an American Guitar Hero. Chicago: Chicago Review Press. ISBN 978-1613733318.
- Welding, Pete (1965). The Paul Butterfield Blues Band (Media notes). Paul Butterfield Blues Band. Elektra Records. EKL–294/EKS–7294.
- Wolkin, Jan Mark; Keenom, Bill (2000). Michael Bloomfield – If You Love These Blues: An Oral History. San Francisco: Backbeat Books. ISBN 978-0-87930-617-5.
