= Gene Dinwiddie =

American musician

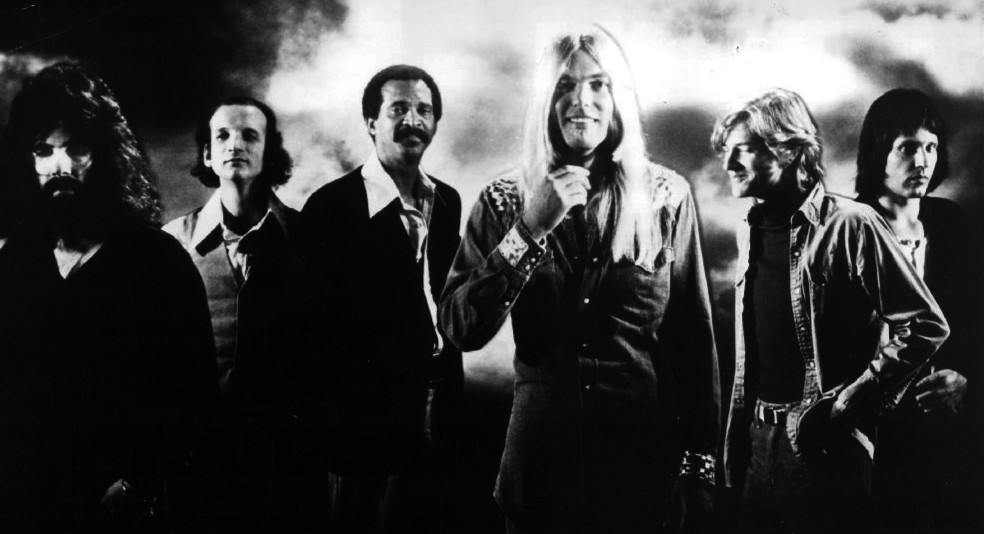
Gene Dinwiddie (third from left) as part of the Gregg Allman Band in 1977

Gene Dinwiddie (born Charles Eugene Dinwiddie; September 19, 1936 in Louisville, Kentucky, United States – January 11, 2002 in La Puente, Los Angeles, California, aged 65), was an American blues saxophonist, who is best known as a member of the Butterfield Blues Band.

Dinwiddie had played since the 1950s in both jazz and blues until, in 1967, the Butterfield Blues Band added a horn section. In this he remained until the band broke up in 1971, and afterwards he was still a member of the Butterfield Band spinoff group, Full Moon.

It also was during the 1960s that he was a member of the James Cotton Blues Band and worked in the 1970s as a session musician, amongst other musicians for, B. B. King, Paul Butterfield, Gregg Allman, Melissa Manchester and Jackie Lomax. In the 1990s, his work as a session musician continued. He can be heard, for example, on Etta James' Stickin' to My Guns (1990).
