= Mark Naftalin =

- Born: Mark Naftalin; August 2, 1944 (age 81); Minneapolis, Minnesota, U.S.
- Education: University of Chicago
- Genres: Blues
- Occupations: Musician; record producer; radio host
- Instrument: Keyboards
- Years active: 1964–present
- Formerly of: The Paul Butterfield Blues Band; Mother Earth; Quicksilver Messenger Service
- Relatives: Arthur Naftalin (father)

Mark Naftalin (born August 2, 1944) is an American blues keyboardist and record producer. He appears on the first five albums by Paul Butterfield Blues Band in the mid 1960s as a band member, and as such was inducted into the Rock and Roll Hall of Fame in 2015. He later worked onstage with the late fellow Butterfield Band member Mike Bloomfield and has been active from his home in Marin County, California, in the San Francisco Bay Area as a festival and radio producer for several decades.

== Career ==
Naftalin moved to Chicago in 1961, and graduated from the University of Chicago in 1964, where he performed on piano at campus "twist parties," popular at the time. It was at these parties that Naftalin first played with blues harmonica player Paul Butterfield and guitarist Elvin Bishop, the nucleus of what was to become the Paul Butterfield Blues Band. Naftalin then came to prominence as the keyboard player in the Butterfield Blues Band, from 1965-1968. On the group's first album, he solos and has a writing credit on the instrumental track "Thank You Mr. Poobah." On the second album by the band, East West, he is credited as "Naffy Markham".

In the late 1960s, after the first four Butterfield albums, Naftalin went out on his own, settling in the San Francisco Bay Area. There he put together the Mark Naftalin "Rhythm & Blues Revue" and has been active in blues and rock recording sessions, solo gigs and revue shows, and as a producer of concerts, festivals and radio shows. He played as a duo with fellow Butterfield bandsman Mike Bloomfield. He also in a band (most often called Mike Bloomfield & Friends) from the late 1960s through the mid-1970s. He hosted Mark Naftalin's Blue Monday Party, a weekly blues show (1979–1983) that featured over 60 blues artists and groups and was the scene of 86 live radio broadcasts and three TV specials.

Naftalin has produced the Marin County Blues Festival (1981–2000), and has been the associate producer of the Monterey Jazz Festival's "Blues Afternoon" (1982–1991). His weekly radio show, Mark Naftalin's Blues Power Hour has been on the air almost continuously since 1979 on San Francisco's radio KALW-FM.

Naftalin co-founded the Blue Monday Foundation and, in 1988, started his own label, Winner Records, which has issued recordings by artists including Paul Butterfield and Percy Mayfield. He continued to perform, both solo and in an ensemble, in the Bay area and elsewhere, often with longtime associate slide guitarist, Ron Thompson. In the 1970s, he appeared on two albums by Quicksilver Messenger Service.

Naftalin has also recorded with many blues players including John Lee Hooker, Otis Rush, Percy Mayfield, Lowell Fulson, Big Joe Turner, James Cotton, Mike Bloomfield and Van Morrison, and as a sideman on over 100 albums. He played keyboards on the first Mother Earth album, Living With the Animals (1968) and was credited as co-producer and arranger.

Naftalin was inducted into the Rock and Roll Hall of Fame in 2015 as an early member of the Paul Butterfield Blues Band.

== Personal life ==
Born in Minneapolis, Minnesota, United States, Naftalin is the son of former Minneapolis mayor Arthur Naftalin; he is married to third wife Ellen Naftalin. His son is the San Francisco Bay Area artist David Normal.
