= Virgil Gonsalves =

Jazz saxophonist

- Born: September 5, 1931; Monterey, California, U.S.
- Died: October 20, 2008 (aged 77) Salinas, California, U.S.
- Genres: Jazz, blues/rock
- Occupation: Musician
- Instruments: Flute, baritone saxophone
- Formerly of: Woody Herman and His Orchestra, Woody Herman and the Swingin' Herd, Virgil Gonsalves Sextet, Virgil Gonsalves Big Band, The Electric Flag, The Buddy Miles Express, Pacific Gas & Electric

Virgil Gonsalves (September 5, 1931 – October 20, 2008) was an American jazz saxophonist and clarinetist, though primarily a baritone saxophonist.

== Background ==
Born in Monterey, California, Gonsalves was a baritone saxophonist with the orchestras of Alvino Rey (1950) and Tex Beneke (1952). In 1954, he formed an ensemble with Bob Enevoldsen, the tenor saxophonist Buddy Wise, Lou Levy, Harry Babasin, and Larry Bunker, and recorded the album Virgil Gonsalves Sextet in 1954 on Nocturne Records 8. Among the group's later members were Leo Wright, Junior Mance, Ron Crotty (born 1929), and Eddie Khan. Gonzalves also worked as a freelance musician, mainly in the San Francisco area.

== Career ==
In 1955, the Virgil Gonsalves sextet was a resident act at the Blackhawk club in San Francisco. This club was reputedly the only club operating on a full-time basis. The club's strategy was to bring in names to play with the sextet rather than bringing in groups from out of town.

It was reported in the 6 June 1963 issue of Down Beat that baritone saxophonist Virgil Gonsalves and his quartet consisting of Webster Young on trumpet, Jerry Coker on piano and tenor saxophone, Terry Hilliard on bass and Keny Shirlan on drums were appearing on weekends at the Colony Club in Monterey.

By the late 1960s, Virgil Gonsalves was in San Francisco and eventually joined The Electric Flag. He played on the group's An American Music Band album. At the time the ensemble consisted of Harvey Brooks on bass, guitar and vocals; Terry Clements on tenor saxophone; Marcus Doubleday on trumpet; Gonsalves on baritone saxophone, soprano saxophone and flute; Nick Gravenites on vocals, guitar, percussion; Stemsy Hunter on alto saxophone and vocals; Buddy Miles on vocals and drums; and Hoshal Wright on guitar. In 1968, the Electric Flag broke up and the remainder would become the Buddy Miles Express. Besides Miles, the group also contained four other former Electric Flag members who came on board with the Express were Terry Clements, Marcus Doubleday, Virgil Gonsalves and Herbie Rich.

He was a member of the Pacific Gas & Electric band from 1971 to 1972.

== Death ==
He died in Salinas, California.

== Selected discography ==
As leader

Virgil Gonsalves Sextet
- Los Angeles, September 23, 1954, Nocturne

Virgil Gonsalves (baritone sax), Bob Enevoldsen (vocal, trombone), Buddy Wise (tenor sax), Lou Levy (pianist)|Lou Levy (piano), Harry Babasin (double bass), Larry Bunker (drums)

Virgil Gonsalves, Jazz – San Francisco Style
- San Francisco, c. 1955, Liberty

Bob Badgley (vocal, trombone), Danny Pateris (tenor sax), Virgil Gonsalves (baritone sax), Clyde Pound (piano), Ron Crotty (double bass), Max Hartstein (double bass), Gus Gustafson (drums)

As sideman

Rudy Salvini Orchestra, Intro to Jazz
- San Francisco 1957

Rudy Salvini, Allen Smith, Al Del Simone, Wayne Allen, Billy Catalano (trumpets), Van Hughes, Archie Lecoque, Chuck Etter, Ron Bertuccelli (trombones), Charles Martin (alto sax), Jerry Coker, Tom Hart, Howard Dudune (tenor sax), Virgil Gonsalves (baritone), John Marabuto (piano), Dean Reilly (double bass), John Markham (drums), Jerry Cournoyer, Jerry Mulvihill, Jerry Coker (arrangers)

As leader

Virgil Gonsalves, Jazz at Monterey: Virgil Gonsalves Big Band Plus Six
- San Francisco, c. 1959, 1959
- San Francisco, c. 1959
