= Expressway to Your Skull =

Studio album by Buddy Miles Express
- Released: 1968
- Genres: Blues rock; Funk
- Length: 32:03
- Label: Mercury SR-61196
- Producer: Lou Reizner

Buddy Miles Express chronology
Expressway to Your Skull (1968)	Electric Church (1968)

Professional ratings
Review scores
Source	Rating
AllMusic	4/5 stars

Expressway to Your Skull is the debut album by Buddy Miles Express, released in 1968.

== Background ==
The album features five former members of the Electric Flag. In addition to Miles, the other former Electric Flag members are, Terry Clements, Marcus Doubleday, Virgil Gonsalves and Herbie Rich. Guitarist Hoshal Wright who was in the Electric Flag, is likely to have played with The Buddy Miles Express briefly in the early stages before Jim McCarty joined. However, it is McCarty, not Wright who played on the album. Other musicians were, Bill McPherson, Ron Woods and Herbie Rich's brother, Bill Rich.

Expressway to Your Skull was released in LP format on Mercury SR 61196 in 1968. It was also released in Muntz 4-track cartridge format, Mercury MC4 61196.

This was the first album released by Buddy Miles and the Buddy Miles Express. The liner notes on the back cover of the original LP were written by Jimi Hendrix; Buddy Miles had been a part of Hendrix's Band of Gypsys.

According to the 26 April 1969 issue of Record World, the group's debut album, Expressway to Your Skull had established them as one of the best in the field.

== Reception ==
=== Album ===
The album was reviewed in the 30 November 1968 issue of Record World. Referring to the music as big band blues rock, the reviewer wrote, "at the vortex of this whirlpool of contemporary sound was the Miles set of drums and the powerful voice". With the group's profile on the rise, it was predicted that the album would click with the people.

The album had a review in the 30 November 1968 issue of Cash Box. The reviewer described the sound as big band soul rock. The reviewer said that there were only seven musicians on the album, but the sound was huge in part because of overdubbing. In addition to vocals and drums, Miles also played guitar, organ and bass. The review was finished off with the reader being told that the album could be a monster.

The album had a review by Billboard in the 30 November 1968 issue. The reviewer wrote that Miles was leading former Electric Flag members into a big band soul serenade. Supporting musicians Herbie Rich on organ and Jim McCarty on guitar were mentioned. The songs "Train" and "Spot on the Wall" were picked as the ones that would fuel the album's chart rise.

The album was reviewed in the 3 January 1969 issue of Go. The reviewer seemed to think that Buddy Miles being a large man, he didn't have the voice to match. Miles' covering of Otis Redding's "Don't Mess with Cupid" was used as an example. Whilst noting that there were good solos and good musicians on the album, the reviewer wrote that they weren't as tight as Blood Sweat & Tears.

The album was reviewed in the 25 January issue of Melody Maker where it was called "brass and guitars music in the modern rock-soul-blues-jazz manner". Miles was referred to as the "ugly hero of the drums who once powered Electric Flag." The album was said to be a continuation of the Electric Flag's style. The reviewer also said that it had a kind of bitter nationalism that drew from the Negro past but seemed to lack the human feeling.

The album had another review in Melody Maker, in the 1 February issue. The music was called dramatic and intense. A mood of frustration and bad temper was said to persist throughout the album.

The album was given two stars by Down Beat in the publication's 26 June issue. Miles' competency as a drummer was noted as well as his proficiency on other instruments. Jim McCarty's wah-wah guitar work on "Train" and "Funky Mule" was called intelligent. The reviewer said that the album was built around the vocals of Buddy Miles, who was strong and confident, but not a very successful singer.

The album has received positive reviews. In a review for AllMusic, Jason Ankeny called the album "both timeless and an unmistakable product of counterculture consciousness".

A review by Progrography was published on 25 May 2025. The reviewer said that the album's title summed it all up. The music was described as "a heavy, horn-driven sound that combined R&B, soul, funk and psychedelic rock into a rich musical stew" and a Stax session that was recorded in San Francisco. The songs singled out for mention were, "Train", "Don't Mess with Cupid", "Wrap It Up", "You're the One" and "Funky Mule".

=== Singles ===
Jean Griffiths had reported in Record World's "London Lowdown" section that the Buddy Miles Express was now signed to the Mercury label, and the release of the single "Train (Parts 1 & 2)" on 15 November in the UK was going to make an impact there.

"Train" was released as a two-part single on Mercury 72860 in late 1968. It was reviewed in the 7 December issue of Cash Box. With its heavy blend of contemporary sounds, the reviewer described it as having enough soul to make it a strong contender.

"Funky Mule" b/w "Don't Mess with Cupid" was released in the United States on Mercury 72914 in 1969. It was also released in the Netherlands on Mercury 27 442 MCF. It was reported by R&B Beat Where It's At in the 12 April 1969 issue of Record World that the single "Funky Mule" was selling in Philadelphia. It would later be reported by Cash Box in the publication's 16 August issue that "Funky Mule", along with "Man Who Paints the Pictures" by "Fever Tree was experiencing tremendous airplay at all national radio stations in the Netherlands.

== Track listing ==
Side one
No.	Title	Writer(s)	Length
1.	"Train"	Buddy Miles, Herbie Rich	4:55
2.	"Let Your Lovelight Shine"	Miles, Rich	3:24
3.	"Don't Mess with Cupid"	Otis Redding, Steve Cropper	2:37
4.	"Funky Mule"	Marvin Holmes	4:40

Side two
No.	Title	Writer(s)	Length
1.	"You're the One (That I Adore)"	Don Robey	6:20
2.	"Wrap It Up"	Isaac Hayes, David Porter	6:37
3.	"Spot on the Wall"	Miles, Rich	3:30
Total length:			32:03

== Personnel ==
Adapted from LP liner notes:

- Buddy Miles – vocals, drums, guitar, organ, bass
- Herbie Rich – organ, tenor saxophone
- Jim McCarty – guitar
- Bill Rich – bass guitar
- Ron Woods – drums
- Terrence Clements – tenor saxophone
- Marcus Doubleday – trumpet, flugelhorn
- Virgil Gonsales – baritone saxophone, soprano saxophone, flute
- Bill McPherson – tenor saxophone, soprano saxophone, flute

Additional personnel and production

- Lou Reizner – producer
- Brian Engoldsby – engineer
- Bob Fitzpatrick – management
- Chris McDougal – "just there"
- Michael O'Bryant – photography
- Rhinoceros Studios – graphics
- Jimi Hendrix – liner notes

== Later years ==
The album was part of a 'four albums on 2-CD' release on BGO Records BGOCD1468 in 2021, that also included albums, Electric Church, Them Changes and We Got to Live Together.
