= You Are What You Eat (film) =

- Directed by: Barry Feinstein
- Produced by: Michael Butler; Barry Feinstein; Peter Yarrow; Associate Producers; Phil Ramone; A. Joseph Tandet
- Starring: Paul Butterfield; David Crosby; Dave Dixon; John Herald; Sharmagne Leland; Barry McGuire; Rosko; Marilyn Salisbury; Super Spade; John Simon; Tiny Tim; Peter Yarrow; Frank Zappa; The Band
- Cinematography: Barry Feinstein
- Edited by: Howard Alk
- Music by: John Simon; Musical Director; Peter Yarrow
- Distributed by: Commonwealth United Entertainment (US Theatrical)
- Release date: 1968
- Country: United States
- Language: English

You Are What You Eat is a 1968 American counterculture semi-documentary movie that attempts to capture the essence of the 1960s flower power hippie era and the Haight-Ashbury scene. The film was directed by Barry Feinstein and features locally known personalities, including well known drug dealer Super Spade (Bill Powell Jr) and musicians of the day, including Tiny Tim, David Crosby and Peter Yarrow, and radio disc jockey, Rosko.

The film soundtrack features music by John Simon and by artists as diverse as Paul Butterfield, The Electric Flag, Eleanor Barooshian, Peter Yarrow, John Herald and Harpers Bizarre, accompanied by several members of The Band.

The film was preserved and restored by Ed Carter at the archive of the Academy of Motion Picture Arts & Sciences.

== Soundtrack ==
- You Are What You Eat – Columbia OS-3240 – 1968
- You Are What You Eat – Sony Records, Japan, SRCS-8522 – 1997

1. Rosko: "Teenage Fair"

- Bass – Bill Crow
- Drums – Bill Lavorgna
- Vocals – Nancy Pliday, Peter Yarrow
- Vocals, Organ, Ondioline – John Simon

2. Peter Yarrow: "Moments Of Soft Persuasion"

- Electric Piano – John Simon
- Vocals, Acoustic Guitar – Peter Yarrow

3. Peter Yarro: "Silly Girl"

- Bass – Bill Crow
- Organ – John Simon
- Vocals, Acoustic Guitar – Peter Yarrow

4. John Simon: "Desert Moog Music"

- Guitar – Al Gorgoni
- Percussion – Peter Yarrow
- Percussion, Moog, Ondioline – John Simon

5. Tiny Tim: "Be My Baby"

- Bass – Rick Danko
- Guitar – Robbie Robertson
- Organ – Garth Hudson
- Piano – Richard Manuel
- Vocals – Tiny Tim

6. John Herold: "The Family Dog"

- Backing Vocals – Peter Yarrow
- Bass – Bill Crow
- Drums – Bill Lavorgna
- Piano, Backing Vocals – John Simon
- Vocals – John Herald

7. Hamsa El Din: "The Nude Dance"

- Uood – H. El Din

8. John Simon: "My Name Is Jack"

- Bass – Bill Crow
- Drums – Bill Lavorgna
- Piano – Paul Griffin
- Vocals, Piano – John Simon

9. Tiny Tim & Eleanor Baruchian: "I Got You Babe"

- Bass – Rick Danko
- Guitar – Robbie Robertson
- Organ – Garth Hudson
- Piano – Richard Manuel
- Vocals – Eleanor Baruchian, Tiny Tim

10. Paul Butterfield: "You Are What You Eat"

- Bass – Bill Crow
- Drums – Bill Lavorgna
- Harmonica, Vocals – Paul Butterfield
- Organ – Paul Griffin

11. John Simon: "Beach Music"

- Bass – Bill Crow
- Drums – Bill Lavorgna
- Piano – John Simon

12. Peter Yarrow / John Simon: "The Wabe"

- Bass – Bill Crow
- Organ – Paul Griffin
- Vocals – John Simon, Peter Yarrow

13. Peter Yarrow: "Don't Remind Me Now Of Time"

- Harpsichord – John Simon
- Vocals, Acoustic Guitar – Peter Yarrow

14. John Simon: "Painting For Freakout"

- Bass – Bill Crow
- Drums – Bill Lavorgna
- Piano – John Simon

15. John Simon / The Electric Flag: "Freakout"

- Bass – Harvey Brooks
- Drums – Buddy Miles
- Guitar – Mike Bloomfield
- Moog, Ondioline – John Simon
- Alto Saxophone – Stemsy Hunter
- Tenor Saxophone, Organ – Herbie Rich
- Trumpet – Marcus Doubleday
- Tracks 1, 2, 3, 10, 12 & 13 Written by John Simon and Peter Yarrow
- Tracks 4, 6, 8, 11 & 14 Written by John Simon
- Track 5 Written by Jeff Barry, Ellie Greenwich & Phil Spector
- Track 7 Written by Hamsa El Din
- Track 9 Written by Sonny Bono
- Track 15 Written by John Simon & The Electric Flag

== See also ==
- List of American films of 1968
