= More Miles Per Gallon =

Studio album by Buddy Miles
- Released: 1975
- Studio: The Record Plant, Los Angeles
- Label: Casablanca NBLP 7019
- Producer: Buddy Miles

Buddy Miles chronology
All the Faces of Buddy Miles (1974)	More Miles Per Gallon (1975)	Bicentennial Gathering of the Tribes (1976)

More Miles Per Gallon is a 1975 album by Buddy Miles. It was his debut album for the Casablanca record label. It also contained his hit single, "Rockin' and Rollin' on the Streets of Hollywood".

== Background ==
More Miles Per Gallon was released on Casablanca NBLP 7019 in 1975. All of the tracks with the exception of "Blues City", a Ben Schultz composition, were either composed or co-composed by Buddy Miles. Miles also produced the album.

Stevie Wonder played clavinet on the track, "Nasty Disposition". Miles' former Electric Flag bandmate Stemsy Hunter also plays on the album.

It was reported in the 1 August issue of Radio & Records, that Casablanca Records in their bid to promote Miles' album were giving away gallon gas cans filled with wine. Casablanca vice president of promotion Buck Reingold, a giant camel and other Casablanca staff; Wendy Krause and Nancy Sain were present at the promotion, as were Charlie Van Dyke and Heidi Schubert of radio KHJ. It was reported later in the month that Casablanca Records were running a promotion, where dealers who had the best or most unusual window display of Miles' album would have a chance to be awarded a Honda motorcycle. There were two motorcycles available. Cash prizes were also part of the promotional event. In addition to being reported in the 23 August issue of Billboard, the event was also reported on later in the 27 September issue of Record World.

Buddy Miles' live performance at the Starwood nightclub in Los Angeles was reviewed in the 20 September issue of Cash Box. He performed material from his More Miles Per Gallon album. He began the show with "Do it To Me". Backed by his band with its five-piece horn section, he performed "Nasty Disposition" which was described as a hard rock disco tune. "Last Words of Love", which he sang "romantically and sweetly" was dedicated to the ladies in the audience, and he performed "Rockin' and Rollin' on the Streets of Hollywood", which the writer of the article said that he got down with.

== Reception ==
The album was reviewed in the 2 August issue of Record World. It was described as one of his most spirited and varied discs to date. His maturation and the progressive play value was mentioned. In keeping with the motor-theme, terms like "motor movin'" and "engine revved" were used. The tracks singled out for mention were "Nasty Disposition" and "Do It to Me".

Tom Moulton wrote in the 16 August issue of Billboard that the album contained two interesting disco tracks, "Nasty Disposition" and "Nichols Canyon Funk". "Nasty Disposition" was described as an exciting song in the blues vein with overtones that were Stevie Wonder-like. "Nichols Canyon Funk" with its Moog and electric guitar was described as a melodic and haunting track.

It was reported in the 11 October issue of Record World that an announcement had been made by Casablanca Records president Neil Bogart that the record sales for September were in excess of one million dollars. He attributed that high sales phenomenon to LPs by Buddy Miles, Hugh Masekela and the live LP from Kiss.

Dede Dabney of Record World had the track "Last Words of Love" as one of her "Dede's Ditties to Watch" for the week of 18 of October.

== Airplay ==
As reported in the 1 August issue of Radio & Records, More Miles Per Gallon, along with, Fleetwood Mac by Fleetwood Mac, From Mighty Oaks by Ray Thomas, Force It by UFO and Destiny by Felix Cavaliere were the most added albums for that week. The following week, Miles' album along with, Motor City Connection by Brownsville Station, the Fleetwood Mac album by Feetwood Mac, Cunning Stunts by Caravan, and Ride a Rock Horse by Roger Daltrey were the most added albums for that week.

Jess Levitt wrote in his R&B ingredients (Cash Box 23 August) that More Miles Per Gallon was getting tremendous airplay all over the US. He said that "Rockin' and Rollin' on the Streets of Hollywood" was his finest work since "Them Changes" and it should put a tiger in Miles' tank.

=== Radio & Records Album Airplay/40 ===
More Miles Per Gallon debuted at No. 24 in the R&R Album Airplay/40 chart for the week of 1 August 1975. The album peaked at No. 19 for the week of 8 August. It was still in the chart for the week of 15 August.

=== Billboard FM Action ===
The album debuted at No. 12 in the Billboard FM Action chart for the week of 2 August. The album reached its highest position of No. 5 on the chart for the week of 9 August, which after that week was discontinued and replaced by the Radio Action page. The album was one of the four albums in the Billboard Top Add Ons-National section for the week of 16 August

It was reported by Billboard in the magazine's 23 August issue that More Miles Per Gallon was one of the four Billboard Album Radio Action Top Add Ons in the Southwest Region.

== Charts ==
=== Record World The 101 - 150 Album Chart ===
For the week of 30 August 1975, More Miles Per Gallon made its debut at No. 136 in the 101 - 150 Album Chart. The following week it had moved up to 111.

=== Record World Album Chart ===
For the week of 13 September, More Miles Per Gallon made its debut at No. 92 in the Record World Album chart. The album peaked at No. 64 for the week of 11 October. The following week the album was back in the 101 - 150 Album Chart at No. 129.

=== Billboard Soul LPs ===
More Miles Per Gallon debuted at No. 59 in the Billboard Soul LPs chart for the week of 9 August. Having been in the chart for seven weeks, it peaked at No. 27 for the week of 20 September. It held that position for an additional week. It was still charting at No. 57 for the week of 18 October.

=== Billboard Top LPs & Tape ===
More Miles Per Gallon debuted at No. 144 in the Billboard Top LPs & Tape chart for the week of 23 August. In its ninth charting week, for the week of 18 October, it peaked at No. 68.

== Album details ==
=== Tracks ===
==== Side A ====
1. "Rockin' and Rollin' on the Streets of Hollywood", 4:21
2. "Do It to Me", 3:14
3. "Blues City", 2:02
4. "Nasty Disposition", 4:05
5. "No Time for Sorrow", 5:44

==== Side B ====
1. "Nichols Canyon Fuunk", 4:04
2. "Livin' In the Right Space", 3:39
3. "You Don't Have a Kind Word to Say", 7:56
4. "My Last Words of Love", 4:59

=== Musicians and personnel ===
- Buddy Miles - bass, vocals, background vocals, guitar, fender rhodes, synthesizer, percussion
- Bobby Berge - drums, percussion
- Ben Schultz - guitars, synthesizer, piano, background vocals
- Stemsey Hunter - alto sax, background vocals, percussion
- Steve Lawrence - baritone sax
- Ken Walther - trombone
- Tom Bray - trumpet
- Paul Cacia - trumpet
- Stevie Wonder - clavinet ("Nasty Disposition")
