= Electric Church =

Electric Church was a term used by Jimi Hendrix to represent an informal cooperative of musicians performing more exploratory music in nontraditional settings. This is represented by various Hendrix jam sessions, the additional musicians with whom he recorded Electric Ladyland (1968), and the group who accompanied Hendrix at Woodstock, informally dubbed Gypsy Sun and Rainbows.

Electric Church may also refer to:

- "Electric Church" (1968) a jam recorded by Hendrix with Noel Redding, Mitch Mitchell, Lee Michaels, and Buddy Miles
- "Electric Church Red House" (1968) a song released on Blues (1994), which is a composite of the "Electric Church" jam and the Hendrix composition "Red House"
- Electric Church (1968) an album by the Buddy Miles Express, one half of which was produced by Hendrix
- Jimi Hendrix: Electric Church (2015) a documentary film about Hendrix's performance at the Atlanta International Pop Festival (1970)
