= The Sacred Mushroom =

American rock band

- Origin: Cincinnati, Ohio, United States
- Years active: 1966 - 1969
- Labels: Minaret, Parallax, Shake It Records
- Past members: Fred Fogwell; Danny Goshorn; Larry Goshorn; Doug Hamilton; Joe Stewart

The Sacred Mushroom not to be confused with the band Sacred Mushroom from Boston, was a blues rock and psychedelic rock band from Cincinnati, Ohio, active from 1966-1969.

== Background ==
The band was led by guitarist and songwriter Larry Goshorn and his younger brother, vocalist Tim Goshorn. All members lived in a house in Cincinnati called "Mushroom House" that "sheltered a small tribe" to escape from "the rich-blundering-narrow-minded-owner-of-the-non-essential-producing-factory."

The similarly named band Sacred Mushroom was from Boston and fronted by female singer Anne Tansey.

== Career ==
In 1967, the band recorded a debut 45 rpm 7-inch single, "Break Away Girl" b/w "Yellow Fever," which was released in the same year by Nashville-based Minaret Records. It was a Four Star Pick in the 11 November issue of Record World. The reviewer wrote that the slow rock single which was about offering advice to a girl with mother problems sounded right. The single received local and regional airplay, and was a pick at radio station WAAM.

The band was focused on guitarist, singer and songwriter Larry Goshorn and his brother, vocalist Danny.

They recorded one album in 1969 which included original material and the covers of T-Bone Walker's "Mean Old World" and Ray Davies' "I'm Not Like Everybody Else"."The Sacred Mushroom" LP was released in 1969 by NYC label Parallax records, the 'underground' subsidiary of Audio Fidelity Records. The album was reviewed in the 22 February issue of Record World, where the reviewer wrote that the group that was interested in the contemporary rock sound knew how to lay it down easy and if they had the right exposure, they could get far. The following week, it debuted at No. 15 in the Record World LP'S Coming Up chart.

The band dissolved in 1969. Both Larry and Danny Goshorn later joined the Cincinnati band Pure Prairie League with their other brother Tim Goshorn. The brothers were active in Pure Prairie League in various forms in the 1970s and 1980s before leaving to form The Goshorn Brothers Band.

== Band members ==
- Larry Goshorn, lead guitar, backup vocals
- Danny Goshorn, lead vocals
- Joe Stewart, bass
- Fred Fogwell, rhythm guitar
- Doug Hamilton, drums

== Discography ==
=== Single ===
Break Away Girl b/w Yellow Fever (Larry Goshorn) 1967, Minaret Records MIN-131 Arranged by Ar-Jay, Produced by Finley Duncan

=== Album ===
The Sacred Mushroom May 1969, Parallax Records: P-4001

Side A:

- 1. I Don't Like You (Goshorn-Hamilton) 2:50
- 2. You Won't Be Sorry (Larry Goshorn) 2:15
- 3. Catatonic Lover (Larry Goshorn) 3:00
- 4. All Good Things Must Have An End (Larry Goshorn) 4:40
- 5. I'm Not Like Everybody Else (Ray Davies)

Side B

- 1. I Take Care (Larry Goshorn) 4:57
- 2. Mean Old World (T-Bone Walker) 4:38
- 3. Lifeline (Larry Goshorn) 6:34

All Tracks "Electric Renaissance, BMI" except A5 (Noma, BMI) and B2 (unlisted), Additional Musicians: Rusty York, Harp "All Good Things...", Produced by Herman D. Gimbel and Don Litwin, Engineered by William Hamilton and Gene Lawson, Cover Design: Larry Goshorn, Cover Illustration: Rhea Atkins, Back Cover photograph: Stu Levy

Originally Released on vinyl, reel, and 8-track in the USA and Canada. Rereleased on Compact Disc by Eva Records in France (1983), Akarma on CD and vinyl in Italy (2002), and on vinyl in the USA by Shake-It Records (2013).
