= Them Changes =

Them Changes may refer to:

- Them Changes (Ramsey Lewis album), 1970
- "Them Changes" (Buddy Miles song), 1970
- Them Changes (Buddy Miles album), 1970
- "Them Changes" (Thundercat song), 2015
