= Billy Rich =

- Born: Eddie Wilbur Rich; April 7, 1949 (age 76); Omaha, Nebraska, United States
- Genres: Blues, rock, R&B, funk
- Occupation(s): Musician, songwriter, arranger
- Instrument(s): Bass guitar, vocals
- Years active: 1956–present
- Website: billrichmusic.com

Eddie Wilbur "Billy" Rich (born April 7, 1949) is an American electric bassist and blues musician. He is known for his association with Buddy Miles, John McLaughlin, Jimi Hendrix and especially Taj Mahal, with whom he has played since 1972. Rich was born in Omaha, Nebraska and is based out of Denver, Colorado. On July 29, 2004, Rich was inducted into the Nebraska Music Hall of Fame, and is a member of the Omaha Black Music Hall of Fame.

== Childhood ==
Billy Rich was born to Milton Rich and Callie "Chaney" Rich. Billy's brother, Herbie Rich, was one of the original members of Electric Flag and also worked with Jimi Hendrix. His sister, Carolyn, was a vocalist with various bands. All three were inducted into the Omaha Black Music Hall of Fame together. Billy's father played the harmonica as a hobby. Billy said that his father was influenced by Sonny Boy Williamson I and Lightnin’ Hopkins, and loved the song "Stone Fox Chase". Another brother, Bob, sang and played percussion. Rich began playing guitar at the age of seven. Together, his father and siblings they started a band called The 7 Wonders Combo. Rich's first guitar was a Silvertone.

Rich played primarily guitar for about seven years. At one point he had a double neck Danelectro guitar with a bass on the bottom. He found he enjoyed the bass neck, and decided to switch. His first bass was a Japanese "knockoff" of a Fender Jazz called a Conrad. Rich states his guitar influences are Chuck Berry, Lonnie Mack, and Duane Eddy. His bass playing influence was James Jamerson, who played bass on many Motown recordings.

== Early career ==
Two months after graduating from high school, The Whispers were on tour in Omaha and were looking for a bass player, and Rich joined. A few months later, after a tour ended, The Whispers were doing local gigs in the San Francisco Bay area. His brother Herbie, Buddy Miles and Stemsey Hunter (all from Omaha) were playing in Electric Flag in San Francisco at that time. Rich met Miles, who invited him to join his new band, The Buddy Miles Express, along with his brother Herbie Rich in 1968. The three were inducted into the Nebraska Music Hall of Fame together many years later. Their first gig was at the Whisky a Go Go, a show in which Jimi Hendrix joined them on stage. Hendrix joined with Rich and with The Buddy Miles Express at various times during this period. Rich wrote the song "69 Freedom Special" for The Buddy Miles Express (on the album Electric Church), and Hendrix produced it.

He was invited by Hendrix's producer, Allen Douglas, to play bass on Hendrix's Band of Gypsies album, but he had a prior engagement. Two months later, Douglas invited Rich to participate in the recording of the John McLaughlin Devotion album with him in New York, which he did.

== Taj Mahal ==
In 1972, Rich began playing with Taj Mahal, an association which has continued on and off until the present. Along with Rich, this trio started with Taj Mahal and Kester Smith on drums, a lineup which has changed over time, but has quite frequently featured Rich. With Taj Mahal, Rich has toured Europe, South America, Africa, Canada, Australia, New Zealand, and the Fiji Islands.

== Solo work and other associations ==
In the 1970s, Rich spent some time in Woodstock, New York. While there, he collaborated with Paul Butterfield and Geoff Muldaur. He toured with and recorded two albums with Butterfield's ‘Better Days Band’. He also toured and recorded three albums with Muldaur. His studio work includes recordings with John McLaughlin, Seals & Crofts, Maxayn, Jesse Ed Davis, Jackie Lomax, John Simon, Roger Tillson, James Van Buren, Alvaro Torres and others. As a session musician, Rich has had the opportunity to play different styles of music, including reggae, blues, country, R&B, jazz, rock, samba, pop and bluegrass. In 1993, Rich played violin for Christian Contemporary Music artist, Daniel W Merrick, on his album, Aliyah, which helped inspire the singer-songwriter to release country songs in 2021 produced by Randy Green of AudioTraxWest Recording Studios in Portville, New York. Rich toured for two-and a-half years with the bluegrass ensemble, the Tony Furtado Band.

Rich's work was an influence on many other musicians, such as Jaco Pastorius and tuba player Howard Johnson.
