= Anne Tansey =

- Also known as: Ann Tansey, Anne Tanzey
- Born: c 1947
- Genres: Rock music
- Occupations: Musician, record producer, music executive
- Instruments: Vocals, bass guitar
- Years active: 1960s, 1970s
- Formerly of: Sacred Mushrooms, Apple Pie Motherhood Band

Anne Tansey is a musician, former record producer and former music industry executive who was active during the 1960s and 1970s. She was once a girlfriend of Jimi Hendrix.

== Background ==
Anne Tansey was born in or around 1947. For her work in the music business, she has been described as a "Jill of all trades".

As a bassist, she has worked with John Lee Hooker, Muddy Waters and Apple Pie Motherhood. She had also worked as a session musician with Harry Belafonte. Other artists that she has worked with include, Buzz Linhart, The McCoys and Buddy Miles.

== Career ==
=== Musician ===
During the early part of Anne Tansey's career, she was active on the folk circuit and performed from 1964 to 1965.

On 29 December 1964, Tansey was appearing on the same bill as Taj Mahal and Walt Bjorkman at the Foxborough Jr. High School at Foxborough, Norfolk County, Massachusetts.

In 1966 she was playing bass for John Lee Hooker.

By 1967 Tansey was fronting the group Sacred Mushrooms, a group that she put together on her return to Boston. They shared the bill with the Nitty Gritty Dirt Band at the Bitter End venue on Thursday, 6 July. Their performance which was reviewed by Charles Barrett was published in the 22 July issue of Billboard. Referring to her voice as throaty and deep diving, he wrote that she scored on the songs "Fever" and "Tobacco Road", but the backing was often not coordinated.

Tansey would front the Apple Pie Motherhood Band. Jef Labes, the keyboard player for both the Sacred Mushrooms and Apple Pie Motherhood Band called her "a powerhouse, kind of a Janis Joplin with a sweeter voice, but sultry dynamic energy". With her on vocals, the group recorded the single, "Long Live Apple Pie" bw "Flight Path" which was produced by Felix Pappalardi and released on the Atlantic label. It was reported in the 10 February 1968 issue of Cash Box that the group had been signed to Atlantic Records on a long-term contract and the single had just been released. At the time the lineup was given as Ted Demos, Dick Barnaby, Ann Tansey, Jackie Bruno, Jef Labes, and Joe Castagno. That week they were to appear on television, on the UP-Beat Show and the Robin Seymour show. They were also booked to appear at The Tea Party in Boston on the 16th and 17th, and on the 23rd and 24th at the Electric Factory in Philadelphia. Not long after the single's release, she departed and was replaced by Marilyn Lundquist. A reason for her departure may have been her getting tired of rehearsals. On an occasion, she turned up with Jimi Hendrix who was allegedly her boyfriend at the time, and he sat in with the band, playing guitar and bass. With the male band members not being happy with Tansey, she herself was angry and left the band. They had her vocals recorded on the album and unfortunately at some stage, her vocals were taken off.

=== A&R, production ===
It was reported in the 10 August 1968 issue of Record World that Anne Tansey joined Mercury Records as one of its A&R staff. At the time she was residing in Greenwich Village and frequented popular music venues in San Francisco and Los Angeles. Described by Mercury's president Irving B. Green as one of the most aware young ladies that could be found, her duties included extensive travel throughout the United States in search of talent that would fit in with the label's drive and fresh musical directions.

It was reported in the 22 February 1969 issue of Record World that Tansey was the A&R director and responsible for The McCoys Human Ball album. And she was currently producing the album for the Hamilton Face Band.

Tansey produced half of the Electric Church album by The Buddy Miles Express while Jimi Hendrix produced the other half. The album, along with six other Mercury albums was set for release in May 1969. It was well-received with the Cash Box reviewer writing in the 24 May issue that it could do better than the group's first album. It was one of the Billboard eight Action LPs for the week of 31 May. In the same issue, the reviewer wrote that it was "a power play of hard, down blues and churning rhythm blasts." The 7 June review in Record World was positive with the reviewer writing that Jimi Hendrix and Anne Tansey produced the "funky sides.

It was reported by Billboard in the 16 August 1969 issue that Ken Pine who had signed with Straight Records was to have his first single produced by Anne Tansey.

Tansey produced the Hamilton Face Band self-titled Album that was released on Philips in 1969.

It was reported by Billboard in the magazine's 27 March 1971 issue that Tansey who had left Mercury Records in 1969 to work independently as a session musician and producer had returned. She was now Mercury's A&R director. According to Mercury vice-president Charles Rach, Tansey was given complete freedom as a producer and artist.

Tansey was the executive producer for the Rick Derringer and the McCoys Outside Stuff album that was released in 1974.
