= Carlos Santana & Buddy Miles! Live! =

Live album by Carlos Santana and Buddy Miles
- Released: June 7, 1972
- Recorded: January 1, 1972, at the "Sunshine '72" Festival, inside Diamond Head, Honolulu, Hawaii
- Genres: Psychedelic rock, jam rock, jazz rock, blues rock, jazz funk, funk rock
- Length: 46:01
- Label: Columbia
- Producers: Carlos Santana & Buddy Miles

Carlos Santana chronology
Santana (III) (1971)	Carlos Santana & Buddy Miles! Live! (1972)	Caravanserai (1972)

Buddy Miles chronology
Buddy Miles Live (1971)	Carlos Santana & Buddy Miles! Live! (1972)	Booger Bear (1973)

Carlos Santana & Buddy Miles! Live! is a live album by Carlos Santana and Buddy Miles, released in 1972.

== Reception ==
Professional ratings
Review scores
Source	Rating
AllMusic	4/5 stars
The Rolling Stone Album Guide	2.5/5 stars

In a review for AllMusic, William Ruhlmann stated that the recording "was not, perhaps, the live album Santana fans had been waiting for, but at this point in its career, the band could do no wrong."

Ebony's Phyl Garland described the album as "a free form funfest bound to delight the followers of both these super-stars of rock," on which "Santana's Latin soul is fused with Buddy Miles' hypnotic beat to create a mood of frantic immediacy."

Shortly after Live! was issued, the editors of Billboard awarded it "Best New Album of the Week" in the Soul category, and a reviewer commented: "This album should get the nod as one of the best live rock albums of the year... The musicians from both Santana and Miles complement each other on every track."

== Controversy ==
Some claim that the album was in fact recorded in a studio, after the concert date with audience noise added, because the concert had been marred by power failures which rendered the live recording at the January 1, 1972 concert unusable for release.

== Track listing ==
No.	Title	Writer(s)	Length
1.	"Marbles"	John McLaughlin	4:18
2.	"Lava"	Buddy Miles	2:10
3.	"Evil Ways"	Clarence "Sonny" Henry	6:36
4.	"Faith Interlude"	Miles, Carlos Santana	2:13
5.	"Them Changes"	Miles	5:50
6.	"Free form Funkafide Filth"	Greg Errico, Ron Johnson, Miles, Santana	24:54

== Personnel ==
- Buddy Miles – vocals, drums, percussion, congas
- Carlos Santana – guitar, vocals
- Neal Schon – guitar
- Bob Hogins – organ, electric piano
- Ron Johnson – bass guitar
- Greg Errico – drums
- Richard Clark – drums, percussion, congas
- Coke Escovedo – drums, percussion, timbales
- Mike Carabello – percussion, congas
- Mingo Lewis – percussion
- Victor Pantoja – percussion, congas
- Hadley Caliman – flute, saxophone
- Luis Gasca – trumpet

== Chart performance ==
Year	Chart	Position
1972	Billboard 200	8
1972	Billboard R&B Albums	6
1972	Billboard Jazz Albums	11

== Certifications ==
Region	Certification	Certified units/sales
United States (RIAA)	Platinum	1,000,000^{^}
^{^} Shipments figures based on certification alone.
