= Rockin' and Rollin' on the Streets of Hollywood =

Song by Buddy Miles

from the album More Miles Per Gallon
- A-side: "Rockin' and Rollin' on the Streets of Hollywood"
- B-side: "Livin' in the Right Space"
- Released: 1975
- Length: 5:03
- Label: Casablanca NB 839
- Composer: (Buddy Miles)
- Producer: Buddy Miles

US chronology
"Pull Yourself Together" (1975)	"Rockin' and Rollin' on the Streets of Hollywood" (1975)	"Nasty Disposition" (1975)

"Rockin' and Rollin' on the Streets of Hollywood" was a 1975 song written, produced and recorded by Buddy Miles. It registered in multiple charts that year.

== Background ==
According to Jess Nevitt of R&B Ingredients in Cash Box, Buddy Miles got the idea for the song when he was leaving Novato, California to come back to live in Los Angeles. Listening to the radio while driving back, Miles kept thinking about the words "rockin' n rollin'" over and over. Because he enjoyed hanging around Hollywood, the words streets of Hollywood were next to come into his thoughts. In addition to composing the song, Miles also produced the recording. Backed with "Livin' in the Right Space", a song that he co-wrote and co-produced with Ben Schultz, "Rockin' And Rollin' on the Streets of Hollywood" was released on Casablanca NB 839 in June 1975.

== Reception ==
"Rockin’ And Rollin’ on the Streets of Hollywood" was one of the Cash Box Picks of the Week and reviewed in the 19 July issue. Calling it a five-star single, the reviewer noted the punching rhythm and floating phased guitar playing. Calling it a monstor, the record was said to have the potential to break big in the discos and pop markets nationally.

Along with "Eighteen with a Bullet" by Pete Wingfield, "Love Don’t Come No Stronger (Yours and Mine)" by Jeff Perry, "Chasing Rainbows" by Blue Magic, "Trying to Live My Life Without You" by Veniece and "How Long (Betcha’ Got a Chick on the Side)" by the Pointer Sisters, the Buddy Miles single was one of "Jess’s Ingredient Picks or Levitt Loves It" records for the week of 19 July.

The record was reviewed in the 26 July issue of Record World. It was one of the four sleepers. Calling it a "Hollywood Boogie for the whole country", the reviewer said that this was Miles' most commercial record. The concept was said to be very Kool & the Gang and Stevie Wonder but with Miles' own definite trademark.

In the 26 July issue of Cash Box, Jess Levitt wrote that the record featured some "great phase guitar work along with catchy lyrics and a good bump beat".

Jess Levitt wrote in his R&B ingredients (Cash Box 23 August) that Buddy Miles' album More Miles Per Gallon was getting tremendous airplay all over the US. He said that "Rockin' and Rollin' on the Streets of Hollywood" was his finest work since "Them Changes" and it should put a tiger in Miles' tank.

== Charts ==
=== Cash Box Looking Ahead ===
"Rockin' and Rollin' on the Streets of Hollywood" debuted at No. 124 in the Cash Box Looking Ahead chart for the week of 30 August.

=== Cash Box Top 100 R&B ===
"Rockin' and Rollin' on the Streets of Hollywood" debuted at No. 95 in the Cash Box Top 100 R&B chart for the week of 30 August. It peaked at No. 37 for the week of 18 October.

=== Cash Box Top 100 Singles ===
"Rockin' and Rollin' on the Streets of Hollywood" debuted at No. 90 in the Top 100 Singles chart for the week of 13 September. It peaked at No. 80 for the week of 27 September.

=== Billboard Hot 100 ===
"Rockin' and Rollin' on the Streets of Hollywood" made its debut at No. 94 in the Hot 100 for the week of 20 September. It peaked at No. 91.
