= Buddy Miles Express =

American blues rock group

- Origin: United States
- Genres: Blues rock, Psychedelic rock, Soul
- Years active: 1968–1970, 1970s, 1980s, 1990s
- Labels: Mercury; Columbia; Rykodisc
- Spinoff of: The Electric Flag
- Past members: Buddy Miles; Duane Hitchings; Jim McCarty; Marcus Doubleday; Terry Clements; Virgil Gonsalves; Herbie Rich; Bill McPherson

The Buddy Miles Express was a musical group fronted by American drummer and vocalist Buddy Miles. It was formed after the 1968 breakup of Miles' earlier group, Electric Flag. They released a total of four albums.

== Background ==
The Buddy Miles Express was formed after the Electric Flag, of which Miles was a member, broke up in 1968. In addition to Miles, the group also contained four other former Electric Flag members, Terry Clements, Marcus Doubleday, Virgil Gonsalves and Herbie Rich.

Buddy Miles was from Omaha Nebraska. So were his Electric Flag bandmates, Stemsey Hunter, Herbie Rich and Hoshal Wright. Hoshal Wright, a friend of Buddy Miles who came in to replace Mike Bloomfield when he left the Electric Flag didn't end up doing any recording with the Buddy Miles Express. However, it appears that guitarist Wright played with the Express briefly at the beginning before Jim McCarty came on board.

The group was brought to Mercury Records by the label's New York-based producer Anne Tansey.

== History ==
=== 1968 ===
The group made its official debut at the Whisky a Go Go on 18 September 1968. Jimi Hendrix, Eric Burdon and Graham Bond also came along. It appears at this stage Jim McCarty hadn't yet joined the band, and it was Hoshal Wright who was the guitarist. At some stage in 1968 saxophonist Bill McPherson had joined the band.

It was reported by Billboard in the magazine's 28 September issue that the band had signed with Robert L. Fitzpatrick for their personal management and public relations. Buddy Miles had also signed an agency pact with Brian Williams of APA.

Billboard announced in its 12 October issue that the group had signed to Mercury Records and was to record under the direction of Lou Reizner, the head of Mercury's London operation. Miles also recruited Jim McCarty, whom he had contacted on the west coast. McCarty had been with Mitch Ryder and the Detroit Wheels. He accepted Miles' offer as he wanted to work with a band that had that "big sound" with its horn section.

In the 16 November 1968 issue of Billboard, it was reported that the group was making its first appearance in New York for a benefit concert for Biafra at Bill Graham's Fillmore East. The Express were announced as the headline act.

The group played at the Madison Square Garden in New York. The performance was reviewed in the 16 November issue of Cash Box. The band was described as a top-notch rock / soul outfit with Miles being the loudest drummer in rock. The reviewer also wrote that his beating the drums in a seemingly relaxed manner produced savage results. Herbie Rich the organist sang lead on one song, "Herbie's Tune". However, the performance was marred by microphone problems. With the amplification coming back to normal, the group's driving instrumentation that was evident on the first two songs was augmented by Miles' vocals on the last three songs. The song "Wrap It Up" was performed as the encore.

==== Debut album and single ====
Their debut album Expressway to Your Skull was released on Mercury SR 61196 in 1968. The liner notes for the album were written by Jimi Hendrix. The November 30 issue of Billboard picked "Train" and "Spot On the Wall" as fuel for the group's chart rise. The single for the album, "Train", was produced by Lou Reizner.

"Train" was released in two parts on single, Mercury 72860 in late 1968. Jean Griffiths reported in Record World's London Lowdown that the Buddy Miles Express was now signed to the Mercury label, and the release of the single "Train" Parts 1 & 2 on 15 November in the UK was going to make an impact there. It was reviewed in the 7 December issue of Cash Box. With its heavy blend of contemporary sounds, it was also described as having enough soul to make it a strong contender.

=== 1969 ===
With a new horn section, the group appeared at the Fillmore East with the Mothers of Invention and the Chicago Transit Authority. John Sanna of Record World gave a review of their performance, saying that Miles puts soul into rock and both he and the songs were electric. He also wrote that Miles finished off the set with the Sam & Dave song "Wrap It Up" and he did as only Buddy Miles can do it.

The group's single, "Funky Mule" bw "Don't Mess with Cupid" was released in the United States on Mercury 72914 in April 1969. It was also released in the Netherlands on Mercury 27 442 MCF. It was reported by "R&B Beat Where It's At" in the 12 April 1969 issue of Record World that the single "Funky Mule" was selling in Philadelphia. It would later be reported by Cash Box in the publication's 16 August issue that "Funky Mule", along with "Man Who Paints the Pictures" by "Fever Tree was experiencing tremendous airplay at all of the national radio stations in the Netherlands.

The group released the single, "Miss Lady" bw "69 Freedom Special". Both sides were produced by Jimi Hendrix. It was a four-star pick and had a positive review in the 8 March issue of Record World with the reviewer referring the record a "nitty gritty deck" and informing the reader that the group tells it like it is. The single was also reviewed by Chris Welch in the 31 May issue of Melody Maker. Welch wasn't kind to Miles' drumming or bass playing. he did write that Miles' strength was in his personality and tremendous drive and that he could achieve an atmosphere in a way that better drummers couldn't achieve. He finished off with writing that Miles sang with great guts and fire. The song would later be covered by Sweet Wine in 1970, Don Adams in 1972, and Beth Hart & Joe Bonamassa in 2013.

Also in 1969, Electric Church was released. Jimi Hendrix produced one side and Ann Tansey of Mercury Records produced the other. For the week ending June 7, 1969, their album entered the Billboard Top LPs chart at 147.

==== "Memphis Train" ====
Steve Cropper was flown from Memphis into New York, where he played on and produced "Memphis Train". It was backed with "My Chant" which was produced by Jimi Hendrix. Both songs were released on single, Mercury Records 72945 in 1969. It had good reviews in the 19 July issues of Billboard, Cash Box and Record World. It was a hit, peaking at No. 114 on the Billboard Bubbling Under the Hot 100 for the week of 16 August, and then at No. 100 on the Billboard Hot 100 chart. It also peaked at No. 23 on the Cash Box Looking Ahead chart for the week of 30 August, and at No. 27 on the Record World Singles Coming Up chart for the week of 6 September.

==== Further activities ====
Around September 1969, Robert Fitzpatrick took legal action against the group, Mercury Records and the Ashley Famous Agency for breach of contract. He sought around $30,000 in damages and also to stop the group members from being paid until he was reimbursed.

That same year, Jim McCarty left the band and joined Cactus.

=== 1970s ===
On April 25, 1970, the group plus Ballin' Jack opened for Jimi Hendrix at The Forum in Inglewood, California.

In May 1972, the group appeared at the 2nd British Rock Meeting Concert, an event which ran from May 20 to May 22. The event, which was held in Germersheim, West Germany, also featured acts including Humble Pie, Pink Floyd, Atomic Rooster, Linda Lewis, Osibisa and Curved Air.

The group released their Booger Bear album in 1973. A Billboard reviewer referred to it as a production of the first order. Also mentioned was the time and care put into the material and selections. The direction was more towards commercial rock than hard blues. This album was also released in Quadraphonic SQ Matrix format. It differed from previous releases in SQ and QS in that it didn't stick to the "front of the music" format. There was more directionality in the music and voices. And on one song, "Louie's Blues", them coming from the rear was effective. The Billboard review mentioned Columbia's engineers really opening up the spectrum. The album entered the Billboard Soul LPs chart at number 56 and remained on the chart for a week.

=== 1980s to 1990s ===
On 27 December 1984, the Buddy Miles Express played at San Francisco's Kabuki Theatre, an event sponsored by Bill Graham and Radio KRQ, with some of the proceeds going to World Vision to help Ethiopian famine refugees.

Miles reformed the Express sometime after playing with Bootsy Collins in the early 1990s.

The last album release that was credited to the Buddy Miles Express was Hell And Back, released on Rykodisc RCD 10305 in 1994.

== Musicians ==
Expressway To Your Skull

- Terrence Clements aka Terrence Clements * ... tenor saxophone
- Marcus Doubleday * ... trumpet, flugelhorn
- Virgil Gonsalves * ... baritone saxophone, soprano saxophone, flute
- Jim McCarty ... guitar
- Bill McPherson ... tenor saxophone, soprano saxophone, flute
- Buddy Miles * ... vocals, drums, guitar, organ, bass
- Bill Rich ... bass
- Herbie Rich * ... organ, tenor saxophone
- Ron Woods ... drums

Former Electric Flag members *

Electric Church

- Peter Carter ... trumpet
- Tom Hall ... trumpet
- Duane Hitchings ... organ
- Jim McCarty ... guitar
- Buddy Miles ... vocals, drums
- Bill Rich ... bass
- Bobby Rock ... saxophone
- James Tatum ... saxophone
- Tobie Wynn ... saxophone

Booger Bear

- Bill Atwood ... trumpet
- Jo Baker ... background vocals
- Donny Beck ... synthesiser, organ, clavinet, piano, background vocals
- Steve Busfield ... lead guitar, background vocals
- Bob Ferrara ... tenor saxophone
- Robert Hogins ... organ
- Mingo Lewis ... percussion, congas
- Buddy Miles ... lead vocals, drums, guitar, bass, background vocals
- Pat O'Hara ... trombone
- Roland Robinson ... bass, drums
- Ann Sampson ... background vocals
- Pete Welker ... trumpet

Hell and Back

- Crispin Cioe ... alto saxophone, baritone saxophone
- Larry Etkin ... trumpet
- Bob Funk ... trombone
- Arno Hecht ... tenor saxophone
- Jeff Levine ... organ, piano, clavinet
- Buddy Miles ... vocals, drums, guitar
- Nicky Skopelitis ... guitar
- Kevon Smith ... guitar
- Joe Thomas ... bass
- The Uptown Horns ... horns

== Discography ==
Singles
Title	Release info	Year	Notes
"Train – Part I" / "Train – Part II"	Mercury 72860	1968	
"Miss Lady" / "69 Freedom Special"	Mercury 72903	1969	
"Funky Mule" / "Don't Mess with Cupid"	Mercury 72914	1969	
"Memphis Train" / "My Chant"	Mercury 72945	1969	

Albums
Title	Release info	Year	Notes
Expressway to Your Skull	Mercury SR-61196	1968	
Electric Church	Mercury SR-61222	1969	
Booger Bear	Columbia KC-32694	1973	
Hell And Back	Rykodisc RCD-10305	1994	

== Later years ==
Herbie Rich and his wife Hilda who he had married in 1989 became involved in the Christian ministry. They visited large malls around Atlanta, homeless shelters, schools and nursing homes, spreading the word. He died in Mableton, Georgia, on May 12, 2004, at the age of 60.

Buddy Miles died in Austin, Texas, on 26 February 2008.

Bill McPherson died on 19 November 2011.

Virgil Gonsalves died on October 20, 2008, in Salinas, California.
