= Kevon Smith =

American singer-songwriter (born 1955)

Kevon Smith (born April 9, 1955 in Chicago, Illinois), is an American musician, singer-songwriter and record producer. Mostly known as lead guitarist and front man with Buddy Miles from 1990 through 1997. In 1991, Smith and Miles started touring the US and Europe under the name Buddy Miles Express, and also as MST (Miles, Smith, Thomas) and as Buddy Mile's power trio.

== Career ==
In 1994, Smith played guitar on Hell & Back released by Rykodisc and re-issued by Innerythmic Records in 2004. Hell & Back was produced by Bill Laswell. Smith also performs in the Supervision DVD Tribute to Jimi Hendrix - CAS (1997) directed by Patrick Savey featuring Buddy Miles, Kevon Smith and Joe Thomas.

Smith replaced Brian Setzer of the Stray Cats from 1988 until 1989.

Smith owned a recording studio in Chicago, where he produced and worked with George Clinton, Dave Hollister, LL Cool J, Keanu Reeves & Dog Star, Oscar Brown Jr., Mic One, and many other recording artists.
