= A Long Time Comin' =

Studio album by The Electric Flag
- Released: March 1968
- Recorded: July 1967 – January 1968
- Genre: Soul; blues rock
- Length: 41:05 (55:18 w/1988 CD bonus tracks)
- Label: Columbia
- Producer: John Court, Joe Church

The Electric Flag chronology
A Long Time Comin' (1968)	An American Music Band (1968)

A Long Time Comin' is the first album by American rock band the Electric Flag, released in 1968. The album has a mix of musical styles, including soul along with blues and rock, with a horn section.

It opens with an updated take on the Howlin' Wolf blues classic "Killing Floor" and includes an adaptation of Sticks McGhee's "Drinkin' Wine, Spo-Dee-O-Dee" titled "Wine". The album also contains "Groovin' Is Easy" and "Over-Lovin' You", which had been released as a single in 1967.

== Critical reception ==
Professional ratings
Review scores
Source	Rating
AllMusic	4.5/5 stars
The Encyclopedia of Popular Music	4/5 stars
Rolling Stone	Positive

It is widely seen by music critics as an ambitious debut album. The album was somewhat of a failure in the charts, much to the disappointment of Bloomfield, who had worked hard on it. His disappointment was worsened by the success of the Al Kooper directed Super Session, which, featuring Bloomfield, charted much higher than A Long Time Comin' despite having been recorded over a period of only two days.

It was voted number 4 in the 50 All-Time Long Forgotten Gems from Colin Larkin's All Time Top 1000 Albums.

== Track listing ==
The original LP record has 10 tracks, and a 1988 Columbia Records reissue on CD has four bonus tracks.

Side one

1. "Killing Floor" (Chester Burnett a.k.a. Howlin' Wolf) – 4:11
2. "Groovin' Is Easy" (Ron Polte) – 3:06
3. "Over-Lovin' You" (Mike Bloomfield, Barry Goldberg) – 2:12
4. "She Should Have Just" (Ron Polte) – 5:03
5. "Wine" (Traditional arr. Bloomfield) – 3:15

Side two

1. "Texas" (Bloomfield, Buddy Miles) – 4:49
2. "Sittin' in Circles" (Goldberg) – 3:54
3. "You Don't Realize" (Bloomfield) – 4:56
4. "Another Country" (Polte) – 8:47
5. "Easy Rider" (Bloomfield) – 0:53

CD bonus tracks

11. "Sunny" (Bobby Hebb) – 4:02
12. "Mystery" (Miles) – 2:56
13. "Look into My Eyes" (Harvey Brooks, Miles) – 3:07
14. "Going Down Slow" (James Oden a.k.a. St. Louis Jimmy) – 4:43

== Personnel ==
- Mike Bloomfield – lead guitar, vocals
- Buddy Miles – drums, vocals (3, 6, 8)
- Barry Goldberg – keyboards
- Harvey Brooks – bass
- Nick Gravenites – vocals (1, 2, 4, 5, 7, 9), guitar
- Herb Rich – organ, vocals, baritone saxophone, guitar
- Michael Fonfara – keyboards
- Marcus Doubleday – trumpet
- Peter Strazza – tenor saxophone
- Stemsy Hunter – alto saxophone

Additional personnel

- Richie Havens – percussion, sitar
- Sivuca – guitar, percussion
- Paul Beaver – keyboards, Moog synthesizer
- Leo Daruczek – strings
- Charles McCracken – strings
- Bobby Notkoff – strings
- Julius Held – strings
- Roy Segal – engineer
- Jim Marshall – cover photo
- Joe Church – percussion, producer
- John Court – percussion, vocals, producer
- Cass Elliot - vocal on "Groovin' Is Easy"

== Charts ==
Year	Chart	Peak Position
1968	US Billboard Top LPs	31
