= Electric Church (album) =

Studio album by The Buddy Miles Express
- Released: June 1969
- Genres: Blues; rock
- Label: Mercury SR-61222
- Producers: Jimi Hendrix; Anne Tansey

The Buddy Miles Express chronology
Expressway to Your Skull (1968)	Electric Church (1969)	Booger Bear (1973)

Electric Church is a 1969 album by The Buddy Miles Express. It was partially produced by Jimi Hendrix. It was his second album that was released on the Mercury record label.

== Background ==
The album was released in 1969 on Mercury SR 61222 (S).

Jimi Hendrix produced four tracks on the album and Anne Tansey aka Ann Tansey of Mercury Records produced the rest of the tracks. Producer Tansey was the one who actually brought Buddy Miles to the Mercury label.

The album featured a re-recording of the Electric Flag song "Texas", as well as "Destructive Love", a different version of "Wrap It Up" which he had recorded previously, and an eight-minute version of Otis Redding's "Cigarettes & Coffee".

The album was also released in Muntz Stereo-Pak format on MC4 61222 in 1969. It was reported in the 2 August 1969 issue of Cash Box that Electric Church had now been released in the 8-track cartridge format.

== Reception ==
=== Album ===
The album was reviewed in the 24 May issue of Cash Box, where this second album by the Buddy Miles Express was referred to as hard driving. The reviewer wrote that producers Jimi Hendrix and Anne Tansey had shared the load in capturing the energy of the group and the album could do better in sales than the first album.

The album was reviewed in the 31 May issue of Billboard. The reviewer called it "a power play of hard, down blues and churning rhythm blasts." It was also one of the eight New Action LPs listed that week by Billboard.

A review of the album by Record World was published in the magazine's 7 June issue. After pointing out that Jimi Hendrix and Anne Tansey produced the "funky sides", the reviewer said that the group played with verve and energy. The songs mentioned were, "Miss Lady", "69 Freedom Special" and "Wrap It Up".

=== Single ===
The single "Miss Lady" b/w "69 Freedom Special" was a Four Star Pick in the 8 March issue of Record World. Calling the single a nitty gritty deck, the reviewer also said that they shout it like it is.

== Performances ==
The group performed "Miss Lady" and "Cigarettes & Coffee" at Madison Square Garden. Their performance was reviewed by Ed Ochs in the 31 May issue of Billboard. Ochs wrote that the performance was superb.

== Charts ==
For the week ending June 7, 1969, their album entered the Billboard Top LPs chart at 147. It peaked at No. 145 for the week of 14 June. It held that position for an additional week during its four-week run.

== Track listing ==
=== Side 1 ===
1. "Miss Lady" – 4:41
2. "69 Freedom Special" – 2:53
3. "Cigarettes & Coffee" – 8:25
4. "Destructive Love" – 4:15

=== Side 2 ===
1. "Texas" – 7:53
2. "My Chant" – 4:27
3. "Wrap It Up" – 5:40
