= Lou Reizner =

American record producer (1934–1977)

- Born: 1934; Chicago, Illinois, U.S.
- Died: June 26, 1977 (aged 43) London, England
- Genres: Pop, rock, hard rock, symphonic rock
- Occupations: Record producer A&R executive Film score composer
- Years active: 1965–1977
- Labels: Mercury Records

Lou Reizner (1934 – June 26, 1977) was an American record producer, A&R executive and head of Mercury Records' European operations. He produced Rod Stewart's first two solo albums, the orchestral version of the Who's rock opera Tommy, and Rick Wakeman's Journey to the Centre of the Earth. As an A&R executive, he signed Van der Graaf Generator and arranged a US deal for David Bowie.

== Early career ==
Born in Chicago, Reizner started off as a singer and recorded a 7-track EP of classic cowboy songs entitled Chante Cow-Boy for the French label Le Chant Du Monde, before going to work for Mercury Records.

He produced Dick Campbell's debut album Dick Campbell Sings Where Its At in 1965, using Mike Bloomfield and The Paul Butterfield Blues Band, who had previously backed Bob Dylan, to give a Dylanesque sound. Reizner was a keen talent spotter, and moved to England in 1966 where he produced Big Jim Sullivan. He gave the Greek rock band Aphrodite's Child their name. He signed and produced the Eyes of Blue, introducing them to Quincy Jones and collaborated with them on the soundtrack of the film The Toy Grabbers (released in the US as Mother). He also arranged for the Eyes to score the music to, and appear in, the film Connecting Rooms, and used them as a backing band, when, having signed Buzzy Linhart, he produced his album Buzzy in 1968. The same year, he produced the Buddy Miles Express debut album Expressway to Your Skull, including the single "Train".

In October 1968 he signed Rod Stewart to his first solo contract and produced his first two albums An Old Raincoat Won't Ever Let You Down (called The Rod Stewart Album in the US) and Gasoline Alley. He signed Smile (a precursor to Queen) and was executive producer on their 1969 recordings, although, other than a US single "Earth" they were not released until 1998, long after his death. He also signed Van der Graaf Generator to Mercury Records in 1968, and arranged a US contract for David Bowie. He even co-wrote, sang on and produced two tracks for the film The Italian Job (another Quincy Jones film), which were issued as a single in 1969. In 1970 he signed Strawberry Dust and co-produced their album Women and Children First with John Weathers, renaming the band Ancient Grease for the album release. The album and band failed but the band later evolved into Racing Cars.

Reizner's output was extremely varied. In 1971 he produced Brazilian Tropicalismo artist Caetano Veloso's third self-titled album (his 1971 album or A Little More Blue); Third of a Lifetime by hard rock band Three Man Army; Wishful Thinking's album Hiroshima and its title song "Hiroshima" (which became a hit for Sandra in Germany in 1990), and Dave Morgan's solo album Morgan.

== Symphonic rock ==
He then conceived and produced the orchestral version of the Who's rock opera Tommy. Tommy was recorded by the London Symphony Orchestra with the English Chamber Choir, conducted by David Measham and arranged by Will Malone. The album was launched at a live performance on December 9, 1972, at the Rainbow Theatre, London, with the LSO, the ECC, the Who and an all-star cast. This, "the orchestrated Tommy was to be Lou's crowning achievement". The double album was issued in a lavish box set, with a full colour booklet including the story, the lyrics and illustrations of the cast in character, "which was at the time the most elaborate album package yet created", and which won the Best Album Package Grammy in 1974.

Whilst still producing hard rock bands such as Three Man Army, Reizner also continued his symphonic rock work, with Rick Wakeman's concept album Journey to the Centre of the Earth. Issued in 1974, this also featured the LSO and the ECC, conducted by Measham and arranged by Malone.

== Film soundtracks ==
The success of these extravagant productions encouraged him to work on the soundtrack to All This and World War II, a 1976 film comprising 20th Century Fox World War II newsreels, set to Beatles songs, re-recorded by current artists such as the Bee Gees, Rod Stewart, Status Quo and Peter Gabriel. Although the film fared badly, the soundtrack album charted in the UK and US. The album included Elton John's version of "Lucy In The Sky With Diamonds", which had been issued in 1974, and Rod Stewart's version of "Get Back" which became a UK hit single. The film also includes a Will Malone and Reizner cover of "You Never Give Me Your Money".

Reizner went on to produce the music to the 1977 film Black Joy featuring Gladys Knight & the Pips, Aretha Franklin, the Drifters and the O'Jays. He was still working prolifically when he died of colon cancer in June 1977.
