= Sneak Attack (album) =

Studio album by Buddy Miles Regiment
- Released: 1981
- Recorded: 1981
- Genre: Rock
- Label: Atlantic
- Producers: Buddy Miles; Jim Paris; Monty Lee Stark

Sneak Attack is an album released in 1981 by the Buddy Miles Regiment, a band headed by American rock guitarist and drummer Buddy Miles. The album was released as an 11-track two-LP vinyl set, and includes tracks that were recorded live at the CIM prison facility in Chino, California. It was co-produced by Jim Paris and recorded and mastered at three different studios in Los Angeles, including the live performance at Chino State Prison, where Miles formed an all-inmate band while serving time there.

== Critical reception ==
Professional ratings
Review scores
Source	Rating
AllMusic	3/5 stars
The Encyclopedia of Popular Music	2/5 stars

The Boston Globe wrote that the album "skips from jazz-rock to R&B with the best material strictly instrumental."

== Track listing ==
All tracks composed by Buddy Miles, except where indicated

Record one

1. "Latin Rock Fusion" 6:55
2. "Can You Hold Me" 5:37
3. "Sunshine of Your Love" 5:42 (Jack Bruce, Peter Brown, Eric Clapton)
4. "I've Made My Mind Up" 7:42
5. "Working Hard Every Day" 10:35

Record two

1. "Colossus" 4:56
2. "Let's Make It Together" 8:13
3. "Jazz Fusion" 4:30
4. "Hold Her Tight"
5. "Dust in the Wind" (Kerry Livgren)
6. "For Your Precious Love" (Arthur H. Brooks, Jerry Butler, Richard A. Brooks)
