= An American Music Band =

Studio album by The Electric Flag
- Released: December 1968
- Genre: Jazz rock, rhythm and blues
- Length: 34:56
- Label: Columbia CS 9714
- Producer: John Simon

The Electric Flag chronology
| A Long Time Comin' (1968) | An American Music Band (1968) | The Band Kept Playing (1974) |

Professional ratings
Review scores
| Source | Rating |
|---|---|
| Allmusic | 4/5 stars |
| Rolling Stone | Positive |

An American Music Band was the second album by the band the Electric Flag, released in 1968. Band founding member Mike Bloomfield had earlier left the group and did not perform on this release.

== Overview ==
This LP was released in December 1968, on Columbia CS 9714. It featured mostly original material, but with a cover version of Bobby Hebb's "Sunny". The record reached number 76 on the Billboard Album Chart. By March 15, 1969, in its ninth week on the Billboard album chart, the LP had dropped from no 88 to no 107.

Mike Bloomfield did not play on the album as he had left the band in May 1968. Herbie Rich played a more active part than he had in the band previously. His organ solos can be heard on "Hey, Little Girl", and their rendition of "Sunny" with Buddy Miles on vocals. Rich also played the sax solo and sang lead on the song "Qualified". He played the sax solo for "My Woman That Hangs Around The House", and arranged the horns for "Mystery". Buddy Miles also was now more prominent and was the only member featured on the album cover.

== Track listing ==
Side A
| No. | Title | Writer(s) | Length |
|---|---|---|---|
| 1. | "Soul Searchin'" | Buddy Miles | 2:57 |
| 2. | "Sunny" | Bobby Hebb | 4:00 |
| 3. | "With Time There Is Change" | | 3:14 |
| 4. | "Nothing To Do" | Harvey Brooks, Nick Gravenites | 4:18 |
| 5. | "See To Your Neighbor" | Gravenites | 2:35 |

Side B
| No. | Title | Writer(s) | Length |
|---|---|---|---|
| 1. | "Qualified" | Mac Rebennack | 7:07 |
| 2. | "Hey, Little Girl" | Gravenites | 2:35 |
| 3. | "Mystery" | Miles | 2:52 |
| 4. | "My Woman That Hangs Around The House" | | 3:12 |
| Total length: | | | 34:56 |

== Personnel ==
- Nick Gravenites – vocals, rhythm guitar, percussion; lead vocals on "Nothing to Do", "See To Your Neighbor" and "Hey, Little Girl"
- Stemsy Hunter – alto saxophone, vocals
- Terry Clements – tenor saxophone
- Virgil Gonsalves – soprano and baritone saxophones, flute
- Marcus Doubleday – trumpet
- Hoshal Wright – guitar; guitar solo on "Nothing to Do" and "See To Your Neighbor"
- Herbie Rich – organ, tenor saxophone, vocals; organ solo on "Sunny" and "Hey, Little Girl", tenor saxophone solo on "Qualified" and "My Woman That Hangs Around The House", lead vocals on "Qualified"
- John Simon – piano
- Harvey Brooks – bass, guitar, vocals; lead vocals on "My Woman That Hangs Around The House"
- Buddy Miles – drums, vocals; lead guitar on "Soul Searchin'", lead vocals on "Sunny" and "Mystery"
