= The Memphis Train =

"The Memphis Train" was a 1968 single for Rufus Thomas. It was a minor hit for him that year. It was also recorded by Buddy Miles who released it as a single the following year and had greater chart success with it.

== Rufus Thomas version ==
"The Memphis Train"

Song by Rufus Thomas
- A-side: "The Memphis Train"
- B-side: "I Think I Made a Boo-Boo"
- Released: 1968
- Label: Stax 601037
- Composer: R. Thomas-B. Rice-W. Sparks
- Producer: Steve Cropper

=== Background ===
"The Memphis Train" was composed by Mack Rice, Willie Sparks and Rufus Thomas. Thomas is credited as a co-composer due to his adding a bit more to the song later. It was backed with "I Think I Made a Boo Boo" and released on Stax 45-250 in 1968. Steve Cropper played guitar on the session as well as produced it.

Even though the record had promise and was successful locally, it didn't break through nationally.

=== Reception ===
The single was reviewed in the 30 March 1968 issue of Cash Box, where it was one of the Picks of the Week. The belting rhythm and explosive vocals were noted, with reviewer calling it an exciting dance side. It was also given a high R&B chart prediction. Also that week, Record World reported big sales for the record in Chicago. It was also a pick at station, WVON.

=== Charts ===
==== Cash Box Top 50 In R&B Locations ====
For the week of 6 April 1968, "The Memphis Train" was at No. 49 in the Cash Box Top 50 In R&B Locations chart. It held that position for one more week.

== Buddy Miles version ==
"Memphis Train"

Song by The Buddy Miles Express
- A-side: "Memphis Train"
- B-side: "My Chant"
- Released: 1969
- Length: 2:30
- Label: Mercury 72945
- Composer: (R. Thomas - R.W. Sparks)
- Producer: Steve Cropper

=== Background ===
Steve Cropper was flown from Memphis into New York, where he played on and produced Buddy Miles' version of "The Memphis Train". With the title shortened to "Memphis Train", it was backed with "My Chant" which was produced by Jimi Hendrix. Both songs were released on single, Mercury Records 72945 in 1969.

=== Reception ===
"Memphis Train" was a Billboard Top 60 Spotlight single for the week of 19 July. With the reviewer referring to the record as a funky blues rhythm item, good chart action was predicted.

The single was a Cash Box Choice Programming single for the week of 19 July. With the reviewer thinking that Buddy Miles' version was a variation on his earlier single, "Train", the single was said to bolt with blues and underground impact. An impact in sales was predicted.

The single was a Four Star Pick in the 19 July issue of Record World. The reviewer praised Steve Cropper's production, calling it tops, he also said that this could be the best thing that Buddy Miles had put on record.

=== Charts ===
==== Cash Box Looking Ahead ====
For the week of 26 July 1969, "Memphis Train" debuted at No. 35 in the Cash Box Looking Ahead chart. It peaked at No. 23 for the week of 30 August.

==== Billboard Bubbling Under the Hot 100 ====
For the week of 2 August, the single debuted at No. 122 in the Billboard Bubbling Under the Hot 100 chart. It peaked at No. 114 for the week of 16 August.

==== Billboard Hot 100 ====
For the week of 23 August, "Memphis Train" debuted at No. 100 in the Billboard Hot 100 chart. It didn't progress any further.

==== Record World Singles Coming Up ====
The single also made the Record World Singles Coming Up chart. It was at No. 30 for the week of 16 August. It peaked at No. 27 for the week of 6 September. It was still holding the position of 27 for the week of 20 September. It was still in the chart for the week of 18 October.

== Other versions ==
- Melissa Etheridge recorded her version of the song which is the opening track of her 2016 Memphis Rock and Soul album.
