= Them Changes (Buddy Miles song) =

Single by Buddy Miles

from the album Them Changes
- A-side: "Them Changes"
- B-side: "Spot on the Wall"
- Released: 1970
- Length: 3:00
- Producer: Robin McBride

United States singles chronology
"Memphis Train" (1969)	"Them Changes" (1970)	"Down by the River" (1970)

"Them Changes" was a 1970 single by Buddy Miles. It was a hit for him that year, registering on multiple charts.

== Background ==
"Them Changes" was backed with "Spot on the Wall" and released in the United States on Mercury 73008 in March 1970.

With the single having broken out in San Francisco, John Antoon, the national singles promotion director for the Mercury label was hoping that "Them Changes" would break out all over the country and into the Top Forty. It was reported in the 28 March 1970 issue of Cash Box that Mercury Records had launched an intensive campaign to increase the chances of a crossover from the R&B chart into the Top Forty chart.

The song is used in the 2000 film, Remember the Titans.

As critic Richie Unterberger has pointed out, "Them Changes" bears a close resemblance to the 1969 song "Sing Lady Sing" by the New York Rock & Roll Ensemble. Unterberger quotes NYRRE guitarist Clif Nivison as saying, "Buddy Miles took pretty much all the guitar lines that Michael (Kamen) and I wrote and used them in 'Them Changes,' ... It is the same song with a different vocal."

== Reception ==
According to Kal Rudman's Money Music in the 4 April issue of Record World, "Them Changes" was exploding and a sure hit.

== Airplay ==
It was reported in Record World for the week of 4 April that "Them Changes" had exploded into the Top 10 at radio station WOL in Washington. It was also at No. 6 on the chart of St. Louis station KATZ.

== Charts ==
=== Billboard Best Selling Soul Singles ===
"Them Changes" debuted at No. 36 in the Billboard Best Selling Soul Singles chart for the week of 4 April 1970. It was also one of the Star Performers that week. It held the position for another week.

=== Billboard Bubbling Under the Hot 100 ===
"Them Changes" debuted at No. 114 in the Billboard Bubbling Under the Hot 100 chart for the week of 4 April. It peaked at No. 110 for the week of 25 April.

=== Billboard Hot 100 ===
A Star Performer, "Them Changes" debuted at No. 87 in the Billboard Hot 100 for the week of 2 May. It was at No. 89 for the week of 16 May. It then dropped off the chart for two weeks. It re-entered the chart at No. 82 for the week of 6 June. It was at No. 81 for the week of 20 June 1971. It was then absent from the chart for 55 weeks. It re-entered the chart at No. 86 for the week of 17 July 1971. The following week, it was at No. 84. It then dropped off the chart for a week and re-entered at No. No. 91 for the week of 7 August. It had an unbroken run until the week of 25 September, where it peaked at No. 62. It held that position for one more week.

=== Cash Box Top 50 in R&B Locations ===
"Them Changes" debuted at No. 50 in the Top 50 in R&B Locations chart for the week of 14 March. It peaked at No. 43 for the week of 28 March. It was still in the chart for the week of 25 April.

=== Cash Box Looking Ahead ===
"Chem Changes" debuted at No. 15 in the Cash Box Looking Ahead chart for the week of 18 April 1970. It peaked at No. 7 for the week of 6 June.

=== Cash Box Top 100 ===
"Them Changes" debuted at No. 99 in the Cash Box Top 100 singles chart for the week of 13 June. The following week it had dropped off the chart. "Them changes" would chart again in 1971, debuting at No. 94 for the week of 18 September. It peaked at No. 82 for the week of 2 October.
