= Stemsy Hunter =

American saxophonist and vocalist

- Born: Harold Hunter
- Origin: Omaha, Nebraska
- Genres: soul, rock, funk, blues
- Occupation: Musician
- Instruments: Saxophone, flute, guitar, bass guitar, vocals
- Years active: 1960s–present

Harold Hunter aka Stemziel "Stemsy" Hunter is an American saxophonist and vocalist. During the 1960s, he was a member of The Electric Flag. He has also played on recordings by Buddy Miles, as well as being a member of Miles's band. Other artists to whose recordings he has contributed are by Crackin' and Gil Scott-Heron. He is also the owner of the Olive Branch Records label, and a record producer.

== Background ==
Hunter — like Buddy Miles and Herbie Rich — hails from Omaha, Nebraska.

== Career ==
=== 1960s ===
As a young man, he was a member of the group led by Andrew Lewis called Andre Lewis & the New Breed. Hunter, who was a friend of Buddy Miles was brought into the Electric Flag in 1968 when the band were encountering some problems. Members Marcus Doubleday and Peter Strazza were on the verge of getting fired. saxophonist Herbie Rich was doubling on sax and organ as Mike Fonfara who was on organ had just left. Possibly as a result of the drug issues involving some other members of the band, Hunter and Herbie Rich were tied up and robbed by drug dealers and taken Peter Strazza hostage with Buddy Miles and Mike Bloomfield in another room sleeping through the whole event.

While with the band, he played at venues such as the Carousel Ballroom in San Francisco, California.

=== 1970s ===
During the 1970s Hunter played contributed to recordings by various artists. He played on recordings by the group Maxayn. Along with Maxayn Lewis, Andre Lewis, Marlo Henderson, Emry Thomas and Hank Redd, he co-composed the track "Jam For Jack", which appeared on the 1972 self-titled LP by Maxayn. In the last quarter of 1973, Hunter joined a group called The Fabulous Rhinestones, which also included Kal David, Marty Grebb, Jack Sarangella and Harvey Brooks.

=== 1980s and 1990s ===
In 1989, Hunter along with Ken Wright co-produced the On The Rampage album for Guitar Shorty. He was also the credited producer for the "On The Rampage" single. He teamed up with his childhood friends, Buddy Miles, Andre Lewis, Billy Rich, and Marlo Henderson in the group Buddy Miles and the Mighty Rhythm Tribe for the Tribe Vibe album that was released in 1993. He played alto sax on the Red Hot & Blues album by Jimmy "Preacher" Ellis which was released in 1996.

=== 2000s ===
Since the 2000s, Hunter's work has included his solo act which covers styles from R&B and Jazz to some country music. He has also worked on Norwegian Cruise Lines as a performer for at least seven years.

In 2018, Hunter was playing in a group called Curly Martin & Friends.

== Appearances / session work ==
Artist	Title	Release info	Year	Track(s)	Role	Notes
John Simon / The Electric Flag	You Are What You Eat	Columbia Masterworks OS 3240	1968	"Freakout"	alto saxophone	Various artists album from the film You Are What You Eat
The Electric Flag	An American Music Band	Columbia CS 9714	1968	"Soul Searchin'" "With Time There Is Change"	arranger (horns) vocals	Saxophone on various tracks
The Electric Flag Featuring Erma Franklin	Live 1968	RockBeat Records – ROC-CD-3311	2015		Alto saxophone	
Buddy Miles	A Message to the People	Mercury SRM 1-608	1970		alto saxophone, backing vocals	
Buddy Miles	Buddy Miles Live	Mercury – SRM-2-7500	1971			
Maxayn	Maxayn	Capricorn Records CP 0103	1972	"You Can't Always Get What You Want", Gimme Shelter" "Jam For Jack" "Doing Nothing, Nothing Doing"	alto saxophone on all except for "Doing Nothing, Nothing Doing" (flute); Also co-composer on "Jam For Jack"	
Maxayn	Mindful	Capricorn Records CP 0110	1973	"Good Things", "Stone Crazy" "Check Out Your Mind", "I Want To Rest My Mind"	horns	arranger
Buddy Miles	More Miles Per Gallon	Casablanca NBLP 7019	1975		alto saxophone, backing vocals, percussion	
Crackin'	Crackin'	Warner Bros. Records BS 3123	1977	"The Force Is Watching You"	alto saxophonist, soloist	
Nanette Workman	Nanette Workman	Pacha PAC-11205	1977		alto saxophone	
B & G Rhythm	B & G Rhythm	Polydor PD-1-6132	1978		alto saxophone	Credited on LP notes as Harold (Stemsie) Hunter
Gil Scott-Heron	Real Eyes	Arista – AL 9540	1980	"The Train From Washington", "A Legend In His Own Mind"	alto saxophone	
Calvin Keys	Full Court Press	Olive Branch Records ER 5453A	1985		Co-producer, engineer	aka Harold Hunter
Guitar Shorty	On The Rampage	Olive Branch Records ER 5456	1989			co-producer
Buddy Miles And The Mighty Rhythm Tribe	The Mighty Rhythm Tribe	Lakeside LAKE 2020	1993	(4) "Do Me A Favour", (6) "Tribe Vibe",(7) "Please Don't Stop My Heart" (8) "Sugar Baby"	saxophone solo on 4,6,8 lead vocals on (7)	saxophone, keyboards, vocals
Chicano Soul N Power	Chicano 2 Da Bone	F.M. 55002	(c)1996		alto sax	
Jimmy Ellis	Red, Hot & Blues	Kris Records 8147	1996		alto saxophone	
Various artists	Midwest Funk: Funk 45's from Tornado Alley	Now-Again 5012	2004	undisclosed track(s)	tenor sax	Credited as Harold "Stems" Hunter
Mike Bloomfield	From His Head to His Heart to His Hands	Columbia / Sony Legacy 1110689	2014		baritone sax	Credited as Stemzie Hunter
