= Wrap It Up =

Soul music song

"Wrap It Up" is a soul song originally recorded by the American duo Sam & Dave and written by Isaac Hayes and David Porter. It was released in January 1968 as the B-side to "I Thank You".

It was also recorded by other artists, such as Archie Bell & the Drells in 1970, Romeo Void in 1982 and Eurythmics in 1983. It was a minor hit in a version by the Fabulous Thunderbirds in 1986.

== Sam & Dave version ==
"Wrap it Up"

Song
- A-side: "I Thank You"
- B-side: "Wrap It Up"
- Released: January 1968
- Length: 2:27
- Label: Stax 45-242
- Composer: Isaac Hayes - David Porter
- Producers: Isaac Hayes & David Porter

=== Background ===
"Wrap it Up" was written by Isaac Hayes and David Porter. It was the B side of I Thank You. Hayes and Portner also produced the single which was released on Stax 45-242 in January 1968. As far as radio was concerned in March 1968, Sam & Dave had a two-sided hit with their single.

=== Reception ===
Both "I Thank You" and "Wrap It Up" were reviewed by Derek Johnson in the 17 February issue of English publication New Musical Express. In spite of his praise of the A side, he did write that it was a pity that it was so tuneless. With the flip side ("Wrap it Up") he wrote that it had a "compulsive jerk beat, a raving duet and an urgent brassy backing" that "almost set the turntable alight".

According to Kal Rudman in his Money Music column, WCLS in Columbus, Georgia and many other pop and R&B stations had pointed out the B side of Sam & Dave's hit was a powerhouse and his advice was to check it out.

=== Airplay ===
According to the R&B Beat section in the 2 March issue of Record World, "Wrap It Up had broken wide open. Radio WVON in Chicago had made it the "Top and Bottom of the Week".

It was reported in the 20 April 1968 issue of Record World that "Wrap It was at No. 22 at WWRL in New York City. It was also breaking out there.

== Archie Bell and the Drells version ==
"Wrap it Up"

Single by Archie Bell and the Drells
- A-side: "Wrap It Up"
- B-side: "Deal with Him"
- Released: October 1970
- Length: 2:40
- Label: Atlantic 45-2768
- Composers: Isaac Hayes & David Porter
- Producers: Dave Crawford & Brad Shapiro

=== Background ===
"Wrap it Up" was composed by Isaac Hayes and David Porter. Working with producers Dave Crawford and Brad Shapiro and arranger Wade Marcus, Archie Bell and the Drells recorded the song. Backed with an Archie Bell composition, "Deal with Him", it was released on Atlantic 45-2768 in October 1970.

It was reported in R&B Beat section of the 24 October issue of Record World that the Atlantic label rushing out a fantastic new Archie Bell called "Wrap It Up".

It was reported in the 31 October issue of Record World that in the previous week, Atlantic Records had mistakenly sent out acetates of "Wrap it Up" without any labels. Before they could rectify the situation, they were hit with enthusiastic responses from deejays and program directors from across the country. They were now shipping the records that week.

=== Reception ===
"Warp it Up" was reviewed in the 31 October 1970 issue of Cash Box. where it was one of the Picks of the Week. The reviewer wrote that it should reap fiery results with teen listeners on the blues and rock sides and finished off with calling it a powerful dancer.

The single was a Four-Star Pick in the 31 October issue of Record World with the reviewer writing that Archie Bell and the Drells had revived a great Sam & Dave tune that sounded good. The sales potential was also noted.

=== Charts ===
==== Billboard ====
The record peaked at No. 93 on the Billboard singles chart and No. 33 on the Soul Singles chart.

==== Record World ====
"Wrap it Up" debuted at No. 120 in the Record World 101 - 150 Singles chart for the week of 21 November. It peaked at No. 105 in that chart for the week of 12 December. It also debuted at No. 47 in the Record World R&B Singles chart that week. The single debuted at No. 96 in the Record World Singles Chart for the week of 19 December. By 2 January 1971, the single was at No. 29 in the R&B Singles chart and at No. 87 in the Singles chart.

== The Fabulous Thunderbirds version ==
"Wrap it Up"

Single by The Fabulous Thunderbirds

from the album Tuff Enuff
- A-side: "Wrap It Up"
- B-side: "True Love"
- Released: July 1986
- Length: 2:41
- Label: CBS Associated ZS4 06270
- Composer: I. Hayes D. Porter
- Producer: Dave Edmunds

=== Background ===
The Fabulous Thunderbirds recorded "Wrap It Up" which was backed with "True Love", and released on single, CBS Associated ZS4 06270 in July 1986. Both sides were produced by Dave Edmunds.

=== Charts ===
The single made it to No. 50 on the Billboard Singles chart and No. 8 on the Rock chart.

== Other versions ==
"Wrap it Up" was recorded by Buddy Miles and included on his 1968 album, Expressway to Your Skull. Miles performed at the Fillmore venue on Saturday 22 February 1969. He closed his set with "Wrap It Up" which was described by Record World as doing it as only Buddy Miles could do it. A 19:03 version of the song also appears on Miles' Buddy Miles Live album that was released in 1971.

Romeo Void recorded the song which was included on their Benefactor album that was released in 1982. The 18 September issue of Billboard showed that it had been added to the playlist of KYYX-FM in Seattle.

The Eurythmics recorded a version of the song which is included on their Sweet Dreams (Are Made of This) album.
