= Herbie Rich =

American musician (1944–2004)

- Born: Herbert Lewis Rich; February 23, 1944
- Origin: Omaha, Nebraska, United States
- Died: May 12, 2004 (aged 60) Mableton, Georgia, United States
- Genres: Soul; rock; funk; blues
- Occupation: Musician
- Instruments: Saxophone; organ
- Years active: 1960s - 2000s
- Member of: The 7-Wonders; The New Breed; The Electric Flag; Buddy Miles Express

Herbie Rich (February 23, 1944 – May 12, 2004) was an American multi-instrumentalist from Omaha, Nebraska, who was a member of The New Breed, The Electric Flag, and the Buddy Miles Express. He also played with Jimi Hendrix, Mike Bloomfield and others.

== Background ==
Organist Herbie Rich is the brother of bass guitarist Billy Rich. He was formerly with The Electric Flag and later The Buddy Miles Express, of which his brother Billy was also a member.

== Career ==
In the 1950s, Rich was a member of The 7-Wonders, a group that included his family members. Around 1964, he formed the Omaha group, The New Breed. Members included Stemsy Hunter, Hoshal Wright, Jerry Bennett, Hank Redd and Curly Martin and Jerry Bennett.

=== The Electric Flag ===
Mike Bloomfield once said of Herbie Rich that he plays keyboard like Jimi Hendrix plays guitar. Another member of The Flag, Peter Strazza referred to Rich as a monster, an unbelievable musician who could play any instrument.

Having been a member of The Electric Flag since joining in 1967, Rich had been with the band from its early days. Mike Bloomfield had added the baritone saxophonist in time for their show at the Monterey Pop Festival. Rich was part of the band's horn section that included Marcus Doubleday and Peter Strazza. Michael Fonfara had replaced the organist Barry Goldberg who had left in early December 1968. When Fonfara was arrested for drugs, Rich took over as the band's organist. He had a dual role, playing both saxophone and organ until Stemsy Hunter came on board in the beginning of 1968 Rich had really been brought into the band as a sax player and to increase the breadth or the horn section. Now playing organ, Bloomfield got to hear how good he really was. And he was very impressed. Rich had a liking for Jazz and a soulful sound which to a degree had an effect on where the band was heading.

An incident took place after the band did a one night show in Detroit. Peter Strazza had tried to make a drug deal in his room. This resulted in Rich and Stemsy Hunter being up and robbed by the drug dealers, who had also taken Strazza hostage. Unwise to what was taking place, Buddy Miles and Mike Bloomfield who were in another room, slept through the whole event. In addition to Rich and Hunter having their money stolen, the band's clothes were stolen, the dealers even stole Rich's wig.

By March 1968, the Flag had released A Long Time Comin'. In addition to both baritone and tenor sax, Rich had contributed some vocals and guitar to the album.

In late 1968, An American Music Band was released on Columbia CS 9714. Mike Bloomfield was not featured on the album as he had left in May 1968. Rich played an active part on the album. His organ solos can be heard on "Hey, Little Girl", and their rendition of Bobby Hebb's "Sunny" with Buddy Miles on vocals. Rich also did the sax solo and sang lead on a song called "Qualified". He also did the sax solo for " My Woman That Hangs Around The House" and did the horn arrangements for " Mystery".

=== The Buddy Miles Express ===
After the Electric Flag broke up, Buddy Miles formed The Buddy Miles Express. Rich was one of the four ex-Flag members of the group that joined Miles's new band. In addition to Miles and Rich, the group included his brother Billy Rich on bass, Jimmy McCarty on lead guitar, who was formerly with Mitch Ryder and the Detroit Wheels, Terence Clements on tenor sax, and Virgil Gonsales on baritone sax. Rich played organ on The Buddy Miles Express debut album, Expressway to your Skull which was released in 1968. He also played some sax and co-wrote two songs, "Spot On The Wall" and "Train". A short review on the album in the November, 30 issue of Billboard, singled out those two songs as the ones that would give the fuel for the album's quick rise to the charts etc. "Train" Part 1 bw "Train" Part 2 was released as a single on Mercury 72860.

=== Jimi Hendrix ===
On March 17, 1968, Rich got to play with Jimi Hendrix when Hendrix was invited to Jam with Butterfield on stage at the Café Au Go Go in New York. Rich was playing organ. Other musicians present were Harvey Brooks on bass, Phil Wilson and Buddy Miles on drums, and James Tatum on sax. Rich would play with the Jimi Hendrix Experience. One live show was at Winterland in San Francisco on October 11, 1968. He joined the group on its cover of Bob Dylan's "Like a Rolling Stone". According to reviewer Alan Bershaw, the presence of Rich sent Hendrix into new areas. Rich played on other songs like "Lover Man", Hey Joe", "Fire" and "Foxy Lady". Carter Shelter of Paste in his May 15, 2017 article, noted his organ playing on "Fire" adding a new dynamic to the song.

== Later years ==
Rich became involved in the ministry with his wife Hilda who he had married in 1989. They would take their message to places like large malls around Atlanta, to schools and nursing homes. They also visited homeless shelters and halfway houses.

Rich died in Mableton, Georgia, on May 12, 2004, at the age of 60.

== Selected discography ==
AlbumUS releases unless specified otherwise
Act	Title	Release info	Year	Notes
The Electric Flag	A Long Time Comin'	Columbia CS 9597	1968	LP
The Electric Flag	An American Music Band	Columbia CS 9714	1968	LP
The Buddy Miles Express	Expressway to Your Skull	Mercury SR-61196	1968	LP
Various artists	You Are What You Eat (Original Soundtrack Recording)	Columbia Masterworks OS 3240	1968	LP
The Electric Flag	The Best of the Electric Flag	Columbia C 30422	1971	LP
Mike Bloomfield	Bloomfield: A Retrospective	Columbia C2 37578	1983	LP
The Electric Flag	The Best Of The Electric Flag	Back-Trac Records P 17721; CBS Special Products P 17721	1984	LP
The Jimi Hendrix Experience	Live At Winterland +3	Rykodisc RCD 20038/+3	1992	CD, EP
Jimi Hendrix	Blues At Midnight	Radioactive RRCD 105	2009	CD
The Electric Flag Featuring Erma Franklin	Live 1968	RockBeat Records ROC-3311	2015	CD
Mike Bloomfield	Don't Say That I Ain' Your Man! Essential Blues 1964-1969	Columbia CK 57631; Legacy CK 57631	(unknown year)	
