= Booger Bear =

Studio album by the Buddy Miles Express
- Released: 1973
- Genres: Soul, blues, rock
- Length: 41:43
- Label: Columbia
- Producer: Norman Kurban

The Buddy Miles Express chronology
Electric Church (1969)	Booger Bear (1973)	Hell and Back (1994)

Professional ratings
Review scores
Source	Rating
AllMusic	3/5 stars
Billboard	Positive

Booger Bear is an album released by the Buddy Miles Express in 1973. It was released in both stereo and quadraphonic formats. It made the Billboard charts in 1974.

== Background ==
The album received a positive review in the November 23, 1973 issue of Billboard. The reviewer referred to it as a production of the first order with time and care being put into the selections. The songs "Why" and "United Nations Stomp", both composed by Miles were singled out as solid entries. The album was also released in the Quadraphonic SQ Matrix. A review in the February, 24 issue Billboard for Quadrasonic albums mentioned the spectrum being opened up by the Columbia sound engineers. It also made the distinction between this album and most of the others that relied on the "Front" stereo approach, with the music in Booger Bear actually surrounding the listener.

The album was a Billboard, FM Action Pick for KAFM-FM and KNAC-FM in early December, 1973, and a pick for WNEW-FM the following week.

Spending three weeks on the Billboard 200 chart, the album peaked at #194 on January 26, 1974.

In 2010, the album was released on CD on the Wounded Bird label. In 2019, the UK label Dutton Vocalion released a double CD/SACD hybrid of "Booger Bear" and "Carlos Santana & Buddy Miles! Live!" with the CD content in stereo and the SACD layers offering the original multichannel quadraphonic mixes of each album.

== Track listing ==
Adapted from the LP liner notes. All tracks written by Buddy Miles, except "You Really Got Me" by Ray Davies, "You Are Everything" by Thom Bell and Linda Creed, and "Thinking of You" by Jim Messina.

Side one
No.	Title	Length
1.	"Booger Bear"	5:25
2.	"Thinking of You"	4:22
3.	"Why"	3:50
4.	"You Really Got Me"	4:53
5.	"Love"	3:50

Side two
No.	Title	Length
1.	"United Nations Stomp"	4:40
2.	"Crazy Love"	3:09
3.	"You Are Everything"	4:07
4.	"Louie's Blues"	7:27
Total length:		41:43
