= Apple Pie Motherhood Band =

American psychedelic rock band (1967–1970)

- Apple Pie Motherhood Band in 1968

Background information
- Origin: Boston, Massachusetts, United States
- Genres: Psychedelic rock; blues rock; R&B
- Years active: 1967–1970
- Labels: Cori; Atlantic
- Spinoff of: C. C. and the Chasers
- Past members: Ted Demos; Joe Castagno; Richard Barnaby; Jeff Labes; Jack Bruno; Anne Tansey; Marilyn Lundquist; Bruce Paine; Michael Sorafine; Adam Myers

Apple Pie Motherhood Band was an American psychedelic rock band formed in Boston, Massachusetts, in 1967. One of the several groups involved in the "Bosstown Sound", a commercial ploy designed to compete with the San Francisco Sound, the band developed a blend of psychedelia, blues rock, and hard rock, which was exemplified and expanded upon on their two albums. The group went through several line-up changes before disbanding in 1970.

== History ==
The band originated from the garage rock outfit C. C. and the Chasers, who became the house band at the Unicorn Coffeehouse in Boston and released an obscure single, "Put the Clock Back on the Wall", for the small Cori label in 1964. The first line-up consisted of Charles CC Wicker (lead vocals), Ted Demos (lead guitar), Joe Castagno (rhythm guitar), Richard Barnaby (bass guitar), Jeff Labes (keyboards), and Jack Bruno (drums). After briefly relocating to New York City in 1965, the group adopted the moniker Sacred Mushroom, and dwelled in psychedelic music. They again became a house band, this time for the Bitter End Cafe, and supported musical acts such as Neil Young and Joni Mitchell. The band recruited female singer Anne Tansey, whom Labes described as "a powerhouse, kind of a Janis Joplin with a sweeter voice, but sultry dynamic energy." Her connections in the music industry were responsible for finding their manager, Marv Lagunoff, and for the group's signing to a record label. As a deal with Atlantic Records was pending, the name Sacred Mushroom was deemed too drug-oriented, and, after a humorous remark by Demos, the band was prompted to change it to Apple Pie Motherhood Band in 1967.

The group recorded their first single, "Long Live Apple Pie", with Felix Pappalardi, who is perhaps best known for his work with the psychedelic rock band Cream. Though the single did not break the national charts, it did receive extensive airplay by DJ Dick Summer on Boston's WBZ Radio, as well as on several alternative-music stations just beginning to emerge across the US. The band proceeded to record their debut album, which in one instance was interrupted by Tansey's friend, Jimi Hendrix, who taught and played with the band in jam sessions. However, Tansey soon departed the band and was replaced by Marilyn Lundquist, who performed backing vocals on her co-written composition, "Ice", and a baroque version of David Blue's song, "I'd Like to Know". In some way, all the band members had a share in the writing credits, but Labes composed the majority of the original material. He explained, "I had been writing songs for several years at that point, and found it easy to create appropriate songs for the band. We sounded more like the energy of an East Coast version of what was up in San Francisco at that time." The resulting album, The Apple Pie Motherhood Band, was released in 1968, and mixed extended instrumentals, heavy blues rock, influences of psychedelia and vocal harmonies, and became somewhat of an underground favorite in Boston.

Apple Pie Motherhood Band spent the large portion of 1968 performing in the Greenwich Village and Chicago, opening for musical acts such as Jefferson Airplane, Paul Butterfield Blues Band, Moby Grape, and The Chambers Brothers. All the while, the group experienced a set of line-up changes, first with Lundquist leaving and Castagno departing, citing an inability to travel for gigs. The band recruited singer Bruce Paine along with guitarist Michael Sorafine and harmonica player Adam Myers. Paine previously worked as a folk singer, but after contractual issues with RCA Records' development of his own album, he was encouraged to join the band. Sorafine and Myers were added in Chicago while the group was performing at the Rush Club, with the latter of the two introducing the members to LSD. When it came time for the group to record for their second album, Apple Pie, the LSD was negatively affecting the sessions, and, consequently, there was a lack of written material. Though Labes composed the majority of original songs, he only penned one track, "Super Music Man", with the rest evenly formulated from the other band members. It was more derived from psychedelic rock, but still contained R&B-flavored cover versions of "I Just Want to Make Love to You", "Get Ready", and "Brown Eyed Handsome Man". However, Apple Pie's 1969 release was delayed after their manager disagreed with the group's relocation to a communal farm in Vermont; and, as a result, the band disbanded in the summer of that year to play in the counterculture musical production Hair.

== Discography ==
- The Apple Pie Motherhood Band (1968)
- Apple Pie (1969)
