= Them Changes (Buddy Miles album) =

Studio album by Buddy Miles
- Released: June 1970
- Studios: Audio-Finishers Studios, Chicago, Illinois
- Genres: Funk rock, R&B, soul
- Length: 33:28
- Label: Mercury
- Producers: Buddy Miles, Steve Cropper, Robin McBride

Buddy Miles chronology
Electric Church (1969)	Them Changes (1970)	We Got to Live Together (1970)

Them Changes is an album by American artist Buddy Miles, released in June 1970. It reached number 8 on the 1970 Jazz Albums chart, number 35 on the Billboard 200 and number 14 on the 1971 R&B albums charts.

The title song is featured on the Jimi Hendrix album Band of Gypsys, recorded live on January 1, 1970 at the Fillmore East in New York City.

== Reception ==
Professional ratings
Review scores
Source	Rating
Allmusic	4.5/5 stars
Christgau's Record Guide	C

Writing for Allmusic, music critic Steve Kurutz called the album "quite simply, one of the great lost treasures of soul inspired rock music... definitely worth the extra effort to try to locate." Conversely, Robert Christgau wrote "His singing is too thin to carry two consecutive cuts, his drumming has to be exploited by subtler musicians, and the title cut is the only decent song he ever wrote."

== Charts ==
=== Record World 100 Top LP's ===
Them Changes debuted at No. 77 in the Record World 100 Top LP's chart for the week of 18 July.

=== Record World Top 20 Jazz LP's ===
The album made its debut at No. 14 in the Record World Top 20 Jazz LP's chart for the week of 24 October.

== Track listing ==
1. "Them Changes" (Buddy Miles) – 3:22
2. "I Still Love You, Anyway" (Charlie Karp) – 4:14
3. "Heart's Delight" (Miles) – 4:08
4. "Dreams" (Gregg Allman) – 4:53
5. "Down by the River" (Neil Young) – 6:22
6. "Memphis Train" (Rufus Thomas) – 2:57
7. "Paul B. Allen, Omaha, Nebraska" (Miles) – 5:33
8. "Your Feeling Is Mine" (Otis Redding) – 2:13

== Personnel ==
- Buddy Miles – vocals, drums, bass, guitar, keyboards, background vocals
- Bob Hogins – keyboards, organ, piano, electric piano, trombone, background vocals
- Charlie Karp – guitar, background vocals
- Andre Lewis – clavinet, organ, piano, background vocals
- Robin McBride – electric harpsichord, keyboards, piano, background vocals
- Billy Cox – bass, fuzz bass
- David Hull – bass, background vocals
- Roland Robinson – bass
- Marlo Henderson – guitar, background vocals
- Jim McCarty – guitar
- Wally Rossunolo – guitar
- Duane Hitchings – organ
- Bob Parkins – organ
- Teddy Blandin – trumpet
- Peter Carter – trumpet
- Tom Hall – trumpet
- James Tatum – tenor saxophone
- Mark Williams – tenor saxophone, background vocals
- Phil Wood – flugelhorn, piano, background vocals
- Toby Wynn – baritone saxophone
- Lee Allen – tenor saxophone
- Bobby Pittman – tenor saxophone, alto saxophone
- Fred Allen – background vocals

== Production notes ==
- Steve Cropper – producer
- Buddy Miles – producer, arranger
- Robin McBride – producer
- Bob Hogins – arranger
- Charlie Karp – arranger
- Warren Dewey – engineer
- Alan Hendler – engineer
- Fred Breitberg – assistant engineer
- Bruce Swedien – mixing engineer
- Richard Germinaro – design
- Burnell Caldwell – photography
- John Craig – design consultant
- Dean Rudland – liner notes
- Desmond Strobel – art direction
