= Harvey Brooks (bassist) =

American bass guitarist (born 1943)

Harvey Goldstein Brooks
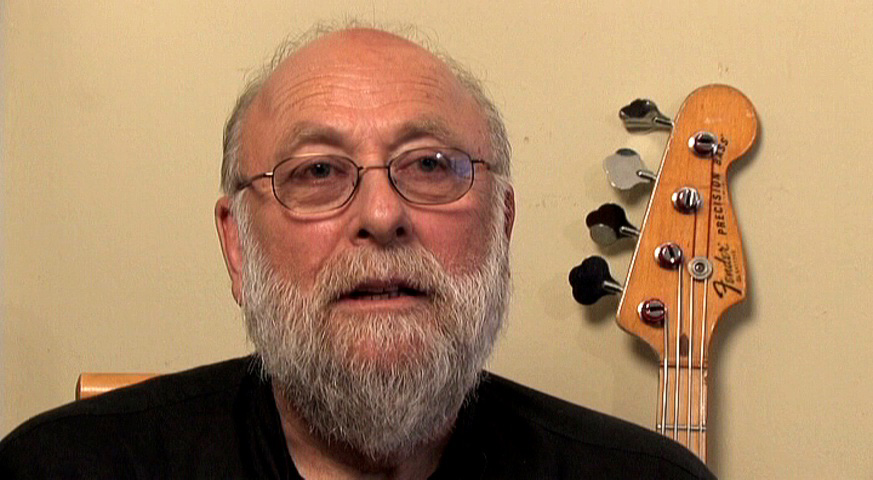

Background information
- Born: Harvey Goldstein; July 4, 1944 (age 82); Manhattan, New York, United States
- Genres: Blues rock, jazz fusion, R&B, psychedelic rock, folk rock, pop
- Occupations: Musician, composer, producer
- Instruments: Bass guitar, guitar
- Years active: 1960s–present
- Labels: Elektra, Columbia, Vanguard, Verve, Just Sunshine, Elegant Geezer

Harvey Brooks (born Harvey Goldstein; July 4, 1944) is an American bass guitarist. Brooks is best known as a session musician, recording with Bob Dylan, The Doors, Miles Davis and others.

== Music career ==
=== Bob Dylan ===
Brooks came out of a New York music scene in the early 1960s. One of the younger players on his instrument, he was a contemporary of Felix Pappalardi and Andy Kulberg and other eclectic bass players in their late teens and early twenties, who saw a way to bridge the styles of folk, blues, rock, and jazz.

Brooks got his first boost to fame when he was asked to play as part of Bob Dylan's backing band on the sessions that yielded the album Highway 61 Revisited (1965). In contrast to the kind of folkie-electric sound generated by the band on his previous album, Bringing It All Back Home (1965), Dylan and producer Bob Johnston were looking for a harder, in-your-face electric sound. Brooks, along with guitarist Michael Bloomfield and organist Al Kooper, provided exactly what was needed. The bass player listed on the album is Harvey Goldstein, who changed his name to his current name after the release of Highway 61 Revisited. Brooks was also part of Dylan's early backing band which performed at Forest Hills, Queens and the Hollywood Bowl in 1965. This band included Robbie Robertson (guitar) and Levon Helm (drums).

=== The Doors and The Electric Flag ===
From the Dylan single and album, Brooks branched out in a multitude of directions, as he went on to play on records by folk artists including Fred Neil, Eric Andersen at Vanguard Records, Richie Havens, Peter, Paul and Mary, Tom Rush and Jim & Jean at Verve Records, transitional electric folk-rockers such as David Blue (whose producer was looking for a sound similar to that on Highway 61 Revisited), and various blues-rock fusion projects involving Bloomfield and Kooper.

Brooks met Michael Bloomfield at the Highway 61 Revisited sessions and was recruited to join Bloomfield's Electric Flag based in Mill Valley, California. The Flag only lasted in its original line-up for about a year, and recorded three albums: a soundtrack for the film The Trip (1967), A Long Time Coming (1968) and The Electric Flag, An American Music Band (1968). After the Electric Flag disbanded, Brooks took up temporary residence at the Chateau Marmont hotel on Sunset Strip. From there he played on Cass Elliot's Dream a Little Dream (1968), and with Nick Gravenites and Pete Welding he produced Quicksilver Messenger Service (1968) for Capitol Records. Brooks also played on The Doors' The Soft Parade (1969) album on the songs "Touch Me", "Tell All the People" and "Wishful Sinful". Producer Paul Rothchild wanted to give the Doors a fresh sound. He hired Brooks to play and help organize the rhythm tracks and Paul Harris to write some string and horn arrangements. Brooks also played live with the Doors at the Forum in Los Angeles and Madison Square Garden in New York and was on the Michael Bloomfield/Al Kooper/Stephen Stills Super Session (1968) release. His song "Harvey's Tune" appeared on this album.

=== Miles Davis ===
Brooks moved east to meet Crosby, Stills & Nash in Sag Harbor, New York. Musical and business disagreements caused Brooks and Paul Harris to leave the band and move over to John Sebastian's house to begin pre-production on John B. Sebastian (1970) album. The Manhattan sessions to finish the album were produced by Paul Rothchild and recorded at Jerry Ragovoy's Hit Factory.

After buying a loft in what was to become The Soho section of Greenwich Village Brooks got a call from Jack Gold, vice president of Columbia Records, offering him a job as staff producer. He connected with producer Teo Macero, who led him to Miles Davis. Brooks contributed to Bitches Brew (1970) and Big Fun (1974). On the sessions in August and November 1969, two bassists were used. Brooks played electric bass while Dave Holland simultaneously played acoustic bass.

=== Other artists ===
Brooks played bass on Eric Mercury's Electric Black Man album that was released in 1969.

Brooks worked with two fellow ex Electric Flag members, trumpeter Marcus Doubleday and guitarist Hoshal Wright, producing the Sweet Apple self-titled album that was released in 1970. The album which is in the jazz and funk genre featured the songs, " Power of a Man", " Silly People", "The Act" and " I Can’t Find My Way".

=== 1970s–present ===
In 1970 Brooks returned to the studio with Dylan for the New Morning album playing on The Man In Me, If Not For You, and Day Of The Locusts, Seals & Crofts' Summer Breeze and Down Home albums, and Paul Kantner's Blows Against the Empire. He also recorded with John Martyn, The Fabulous Rhinestones, Fontella Bass, John Sebastian, Loudon Wainwright III, John Cale, and Paul Burlison. Later he toured with Clarence Clemons and the Red Bank Rockers in 1982 and Paul Butterfield Blues Band in the late 1980s.

Brooks played with Donald Fagen's Rock and Soul Revue from 1991–1992. After a short stint with Danny Kortchmar's Slo Leak band in Westport CT, he relocated to Tucson Arizona in 1994 continuing to perform and record.

In 2006, Light in the Attic, a Seattle-based record label, reissued the 1971 album In My Own Time by Karen Dalton, which was arranged and produced by Brooks. His last USA project was the 17th Street Band based in Tucson, Arizona. With his wife producer/author/multimedia artist and children's book author of Gramps Has A Ponytail, Bonnie Brooks and guitarist Tom Kusian he started 17th Street Records with two releases in November 2009 distributed by City Hall Records: Positively 17th Street by the 17th Street Band and El Regalo, the Gift by Francisco Gonzalez.

Brooks and his wife Bonnie moved to Israel on August 4, 2009, living in Jerusalem writing his memoir "View From The Bottom", and teaching, performing and recording in Jerusalem and Tel Aviv. He was featured in a cover story at Bass Musician magazine, March 2011. Brooks finished his memoir in 2020 and six months later in 2021 released his first solo album of original vocal and instrumental music entitled, Harvey Brooks "Elegant Geezer, Jerusalem Sessions", featuring Oren Fried, Yehuda Ashash, Steve Peskoff, Ioram Linker, Jamie Saft, Daniel Naiman, Ehud Banai and Danny Sanderson. Produced by Matthew J. Adams.
