= The Electric Flag =

American blues rock band

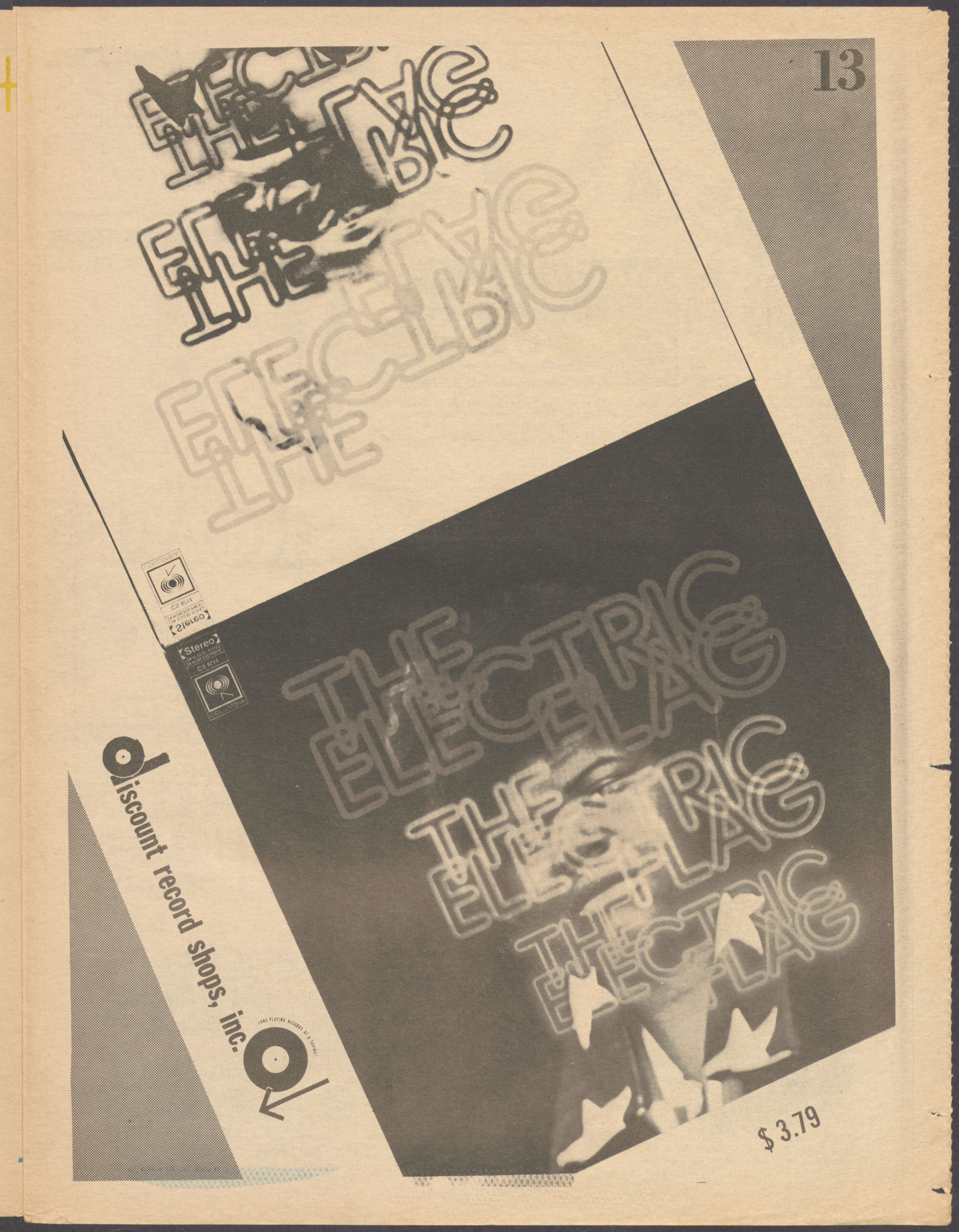
- 1968 advertisement, presumably associated with the album An American Music Band

Background information
- Origin: Chicago, Illinois, U.S.
- Genres: Blues, soul, rock
- Years active: 1967–1969, 1974 (reunion 2007)
- Labels: Columbia, Atlantic
- Spinoffs: The Buddy Miles Express, Sweet Apple
- Past members: Mike Bloomfield; Barry Goldberg; Harvey Brooks; Stemsy Hunter; Buddy Miles; Nick Gravenites; Peter Strazza; Marcus Doubleday; Michael Fonfara; Herb Rich; Roger Troy

The Electric Flag was an American blues/rock/soul band from Chicago, led by guitarist Mike Bloomfield, keyboardist Barry Goldberg, and drummer Buddy Miles, and featured various other musicians such as vocalist Nick Gravenites and bassist Harvey Brooks. Bloomfield formed the Electric Flag in 1967, following his stint with the Butterfield Blues Band. The band reached its peak with the 1968 release, A Long Time Comin', a fusion of rock, jazz, and R&B styles that charted well in the Billboard Pop Albums chart. Their initial recording was a soundtrack for The Trip, a movie about an LSD experience by Peter Fonda, written by Jack Nicholson and directed by Roger Corman.

== History ==
With his appreciation for blues, soul and R&B, Bloomfield wanted to create a group of his own that would feature what he called "American music." He was inspired not only by the big band blues of B.B. King, T-Bone Walker, and Guitar Slim (Eddie Jones), but also by the contemporary soul sounds of Otis Redding, Steve Cropper, Booker T. & the M.G.'s, and other Stax recording artists. He also drew inspiration from traditional country, gospel, and blues forms. Initially called the American Music Band, Bloomfield organized the band that would become known as The Electric Flag in the spring of 1967, not long after he produced a session with Chicago blues harmonica player James Cotton that featured a horn section. Bloomfield decided that his new band would also have horns and would play an amalgam of the American music he loved.

The group was initially formed at the instigation of Bloomfield, and the assistance of Barry Goldberg. Harvey Brooks, who had previously worked with Bloomfield in 1965, recording Bob Dylan's Highway 61 Revisited, joined as bassist, and recommended Buddy Miles, then 19 years old, who was the drummer at the time for Wilson Pickett. Brooks was working with Murray the K on the "Music in the Fifth Dimension" show at the RKO Theatre and was at Wilson Pickett's sound check/rehearsal watching Pickett fine Miles $50 a pop for missed cues. After the rehearsal Brooks approached Miles telling him about Bloomfield's credits, asking if he wanted to meet and talk about Bloomfield's new band. Miles was persuaded by Goldberg, Bloomfield and Brooks to leave Pickett. Initially, Bloomfield and Goldberg had asked Mitch Ryder to be the vocalist, since Bloomfield and Goldberg had been contributing to some Ryder recording sessions. Ryder declined the invitation, preferring to remain with the Detroit Wheels. Bloomfield next approached Nick Gravenites, originally also from Chicago, who agreed.

Peter Strazza, whom Goldberg knew from Chicago, joined on tenor saxophone. Jazz guitarist Larry Coryell, who had developed his career in Seattle while a university student, recommended Seattle-based Marcus Doubleday on trumpet.

== Career ==
Bloomfield and Goldberg developed the group in San Francisco, under Albert Grossman's management, and immediately began working on the band's first project: the soundtrack for the film The Trip. Actor Peter Fonda approached Bloomfield for the project, as a replacement for Gram Parsons' International Submarine Band. Director Roger Corman did not find the music of Parsons' band appropriate for a movie about the LSD experience. At the time, the Electric Flag was rehearsing in Gram Parsons' Laurel Canyon, California home.

Bloomfield was solely credited for all of the compositions on the album. He hired keyboardist Paul Beaver to add texture to the soundtrack, through the use of one of the first Moog Synthesizers on record. The soundtrack recording was reportedly completed in ten days. While the movie received mixed reviews, the soundtrack attracted positive critical notice. As described by David Dann in his biography of the Electric Flag, "The record was also one of the most adventurous for pop music in 1967, sampling freely from jazz, rock, blues and classical idioms, and doing so with wit and intelligence. It very much favored the eclectic approach toward American musical forms that Bloomfield wanted the new band to embody. That Michael could create such unusual and wide-ranging pieces said much for his appreciation and knowledge of those forms, and displayed his characteristic fearlessness when it came to experimentation."

One of the Bloomfield compositions from The Trip soundtrack, "Flash, Bam, Pow," was later included in the soundtrack to the 1969 film Easy Rider. The song was omitted from the release of the original soundtrack and has not been included in subsequent reissues.

The band made its debut appearance at the Monterey Pop Festival, one of the first of the 1960s rock music extravaganzas. Now called the Electric Flag, the group was well received by the audience of 7,000, though its performance fell short of Bloomfield's high standards. Following Monterey, the band toured the Northeast and performed in the San Francisco area while working on a recording for Columbia Records. Though a critical success, the band remained largely unknown to the general public due in part to the band's inability to complete its first album in a timely manner. In addition, Marcus Doubleday had joined the band while in the throes of heroin addiction, while Peter Strazza, Barry Goldberg and Bloomfield developed heroin problems thereafter. In November 1967, Goldberg left the band in an effort to bring his personal circumstances under control. He was replaced by Michael Fonfara, at the time playing with David Clayton-Thomas in New York, and who was recommended by Buddy Miles. Fonfara was fired by Albert Grossman by December, after a drug bust in Los Angeles. As a result, he was replaced by Herb Rich, who had to perform a dual role on keyboards and sax. He had to handle that role until saxophonist Stemsy Hunter, who was a friend of Miles came on board in early 1968. Fonfara was shortly thereafter selected as the keyboard player for Rhinoceros, where he rebuilt his musical career. He spent the 1970s playing, recording and producing with Lou Reed, among other activities, prior to developing a successful career in Canada as a member of the Downchild Blues Band and as a producer of other artists.

Subsequent to completing the soundtrack to The Trip, the band commenced work on its long-awaited first album, A Long Time Comin'. The album, released in March 1968, was recorded between July 1967 and January 1968. The album was one of the first pop recordings to blend sound and voice samples with music. By early 1968, drummer Buddy Miles had become a dominant force in the band's musical direction. The group's repertory by then included numerous contemporary soul covers, featuring Miles on vocals, plus many classic blues tunes. The band produced fewer than a dozen original pieces, mostly written by vocalist Nick Gravenites. Bloomfield's original "American music" concept appeared to have narrowed considerably. In terms of the band's original material, Miles Davis praised the Bloomfield–Goldberg composition, "Over-Lovin' You", in a Down Beat Blindfold Test in 1968.

The group played at the Cafe Au Go Go in New York. Their performance was reviewed in the 23 March 1968 issue of Cash Box. Mike Bloomfield got on the microphone and had a go at the club's "stand outside until we let you in policy" as well as the bad weather. According to the magazine, the date was actually the anniversary of the great blizzard of 1888. The article said that Bloomfield had translated his blues into the finest single string work that the reviewer had ever had the pleasure of hearing, but his vocals sometimes left a bit to be desired. However, his singing wasn't the reason people went to see the Electric Flag. Buddy Miles was described as the group's super together drummer. And Miles' touch of the blues that he had were evident on his singing on "Sittin' by the Dock of the Bay" and "Hey Joe". Hary Brooks with his weaving around and thumping out funky solid bass lines was said to be "worthy of the highest accolades".

By June 1968, only months after the release of the album, Bloomfield quit the group, based on exhaustion brought on by continuing insomnia that was ineffectively medicated through heroin. In the weeks prior to his departure, there had been much public speculation as to whether Bloomfield was leaving the group or whether the group was leaving him. Miles, rather than Bloomfield, had become the de facto leader of the group. Miles brought in guitarist Hoshal Wright as Bloomfield's replacement. Though they strove to carry on under Miles' direction, the Electric Flag was effectively finished. They issued the late 1968 album The Electric Flag: An American Music Band, but personality conflicts, differing aesthetics, and a series of drug problems hastened the band's downfall.

== Epilogue ==
Al Kooper left Blood, Sweat and Tears in April 1968, and was inspired by a jam recording with Moby Grape to organize the similarly structured Super Session album. The lineup included Electric Flag members Bloomfield, Brooks, and Goldberg. Bloomfield eventually dropped out of the sessions due to insomnia, and was replaced by Buffalo Springfield's Stephen Stills. Bloomfield and Kooper later toured together, while drummer and vocalist Buddy Miles went on to form the Buddy Miles Express and play in Jimi Hendrix's Band of Gypsys. Bloomfield developed a solo career, commencing with the release of It's Not Killing Me in 1969, which included former Electric Flag bandmate Marcus Doubleday on trumpet.

Mike Bloomfield released several albums after this, including Nick Gravenites Live at the Fillmore which includes Taj Mahal doing "One More Mile". Buddy Miles started the Buddy Miles Express with a big hit "Down By the River". As noted Miles played with Hendrix in Band of Gypsies and then later with Carlos Santana. Miles died in 2008.

A reunion took place in 1974, with the Electric Flag releasing The Band Kept Playing, but the recording was not a commercial or critical success and the band quickly disbanded after several months of sporadic gigs. This lineup of the band featured Bloomfield, Goldberg, Miles, and Gravenites, along with new member Roger Troy on bass and vocals.

On July 28 and 29, 2007, a concert took place at the Monterey County Fairgrounds, commemorating the 40th Anniversary of the Monterey Pop Festival. One of the acts featured was a one-time reunion of The Electric Flag, anchored by original members Gravenites, Goldberg, and former member Hunter, backed by members of the Tower of Power and The Blues Project. The one-hour set featured material from the first album, as well as several blues covers.

== Other projects ==
In 1970, the group Sweet Apple released their self-titled album on Columbia, cat no. C 30238. It was produced by Electric Flag bassist Harvey Brooks and featured two former Electric Flag members, Hoshal Wright on guitar and vocals, and Marcus Doubleday on trumpet. Other credited musicians were Danny Saunders on keyboards and vocals, Bobby Reed on bass and vocals, Steve Mitchell on drums, and Raoul Smith on saxophone and vocals. Frank Davis also played drums on two tracks. Record World reported airplay on WABX-FM in Detroit for the week of November 28, 1970.

== Former members ==
- Mike Bloomfield — lead guitars, vocals (1967–1968, 1974; died 1981)
- Barry Goldberg — keyboards (1967, 1974, 2007; died 2025)
- Harvey Brooks — bass (1967–1969)
- Buddy Miles — drums, vocals (1967–1969, 1974; died 2008)
- Nick Gravenites — rhythm guitars, vocals (1967–1969, 1974, 2007; died 2024)
- Peter Strazza — saxophone (1967–1969)
- Marcus Doubleday — trumpet (1967–1969)
- Michael Fonfara — keyboards (1967; died 2021)
- Herbie Rich — keyboards, saxophone (1967–1969; died 2004)
- Stemsy Hunter - saxophone (1968–1969, 2007)
- Terry Clements aka Terrence Clements - tenor saxophone (1968)
- Hoshal Wright - guitar (1968 - ?)
- John Simon - keyboards, arranger (1969)
- Roger Troy — bass, vocals (1974)

== Discography ==
Vinyl albums (US discography) Columbia releases where possible
Title	Release info	Year	Notes
The Trip: Original Motion Picture Soundtrack	Sidewalk T-5908 (mono) ST-5908 (stereo)	1967	* The Trip "Musical Score Composed and Performed by The Electric Flag, An American Music Band" (1967, Curb Records; CD abbreviated version 1996)
A Long Time Comin'	Columbia CS 9597	1968	(with Bloomfield and Goldberg) No. 31 US
An American Music Band	Columbia CS 9714	1968	(led by Buddy Miles and Harvey Brooks, after Bloomfield and Goldberg left) Liner notes by Harvey Brooks
The Best Of The Electric Flag	Columbia C 30422	1971	Liner notes by Murray Krugman
The Band Kept Playing	Atlantic SD 18112	1974	Reunion recording without Harvey Brooks, who was replaced by Roger Troy (CD Reissue 2002, Wounded Bird)
Groovin' Is Easy	Aura A 1026	1982	Possibly released in 1983
The Best Of The Electric Flag	Back-Trac Records P 17721	1984	
Live From California 1967-1968	RockBeat Records ROC-3390	2017	2LP

CD albums (US discography) Columbia releases where possible
Title	Release info	Year	Notes
Groovin' Is Easy	Magnum America MACD 029	????	
A Long Time Comin'	Columbia CK 9597	1988	Tracks 11 to 14 are bonus tracks. Tracks 13, 14 previously unavailable
An American Music Band	CBS Special Products A 21615; One Way Records A 21615	1990	
Old Glory: Best of the Electric Flag An American Music Band	Legacy – CK 57629; Columbia – CK 57629	1995	Best of" compilation, including outtakes and selections from the band's Monterey Pop Festival appearance
The Band Kept Playing	Wounded Bird Records WOU 8112	2002	
Live 1968 At The Carousel Ballroom Featuring Erma Franklin	RockBeat Records ROC-CD-3311	2015	Features Erma Franklin on vocals

=== Other misc releases ===
- The Electric Flag: Live (2000)
- I Found Out (2000)
- Funk Grooves (Classic World Productions, 2002)

=== Info on albums ===
- I Found Out (Dressed To Kill, 2005), I Should Have Left Her (Music Avenue, 2007. It is the same material on different releases, namely outtakes from the 1974 reunion recording and live performances from the original band in 1968). The track listing for the Class World Productions Funk Grooves release, subtitled "The Best of Electric Flag" is as follows:
1. "It's Not the Spotlight"
2. "I Was Robbed Last Night"
3. "I Found Out"
4. "Never Be Lonely Again"
5. "Losing Game"
6. "My Baby Wants to Test Me"
7. "I Should Have Left Her"
8. "You Don't Realize"
9. "Groovin' Is Easy"

The only live recording appears to be "You Don't Realize", with "Groovin' Is Easy" being a poorly recorded version of the original. Most of the songs are blues-based Bloomfield originals. No performer credits are provided. Harvey Brooks appears on the cover, even though he was not part of the 1974 reunion. Buddy Miles appears as lead vocalist only on "It's Not The Spotlight", a 1973 song co-written by Barry Goldberg and Gerry Goffin. The song was recorded by both Manhattan Transfer and Rod Stewart, but did not find its way on to The Band Kept Playing (1974).
