= Buddy Miles =

American drummer and singer (1947–2008)

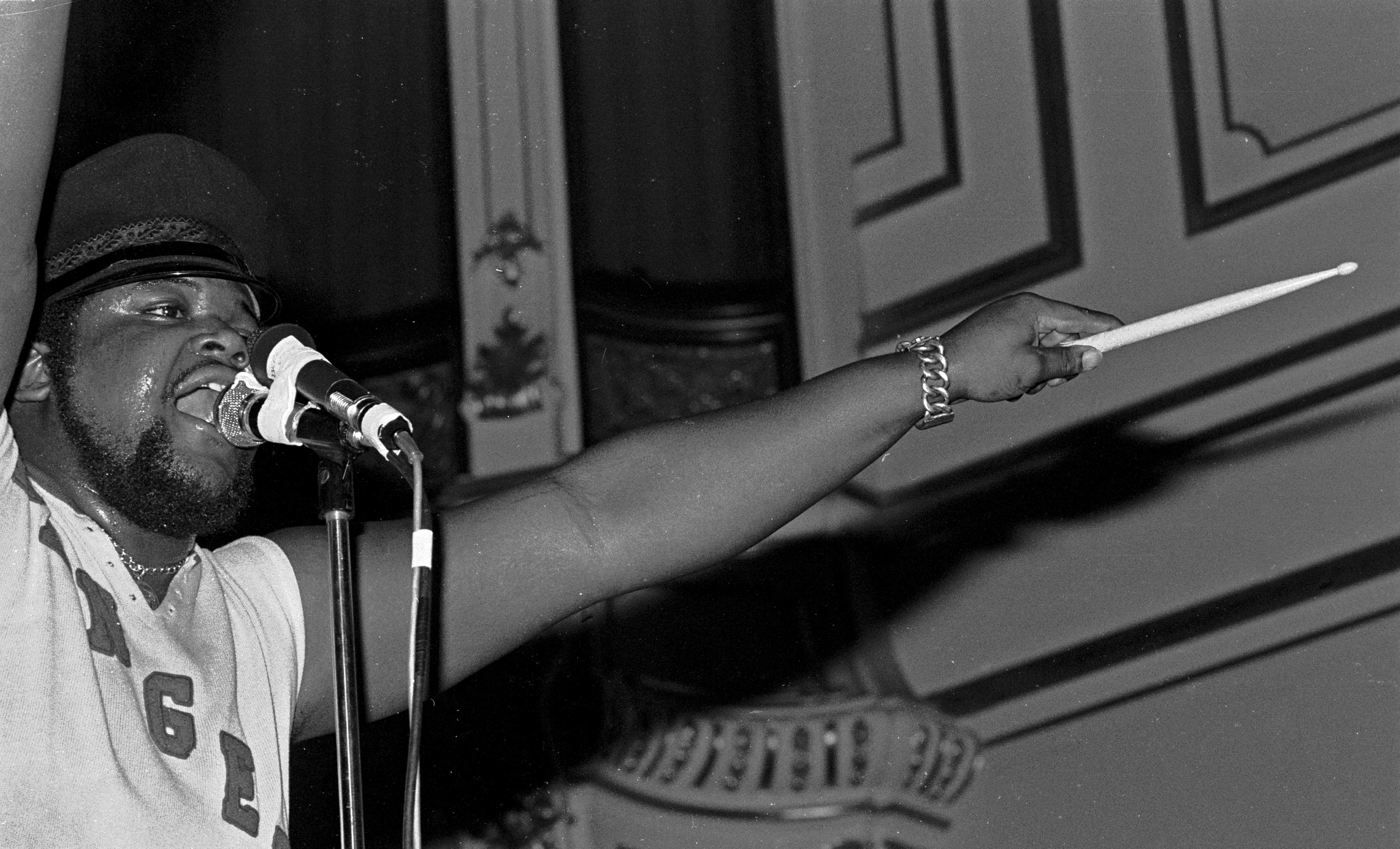
- Miles performing in Germany, 1972

Background information
- Born: George Allen Miles Jr. September 5, 1947; Omaha, Nebraska, U.S.
- Died: February 26, 2008 (aged 60) Austin, Texas
- Genres: Funk; rock; R&B; jazz fusion; soul
- Occupations: Musician; songwriter; arranger
- Instruments: Drums; guitar; keyboards; vocals
- Years active: 1959–2008
- Labels: Columbia; Mercury; Atlantic; Casablanca
- Website: www.buddymiles.com

George Allen "Buddy" Miles Jr. (September 5, 1947 – February 26, 2008) was an American composer, drummer, guitarist, vocalist and producer. He was a founding member of the Electric Flag (1967), a member of Jimi Hendrix's Band of Gypsys (1969–1970), founder and leader of the Buddy Miles Express and later, the Buddy Miles Band. Miles also played and recorded with Carlos Santana, John McLaughlin, and others. He also sang lead vocals on the California Raisins claymation TV commercials and recorded two California Raisins R&B albums.

== Biography and career ==
=== Early life ===
Miles was born in Omaha, Nebraska, on September 5, 1947. Miles's father played upright bass for Duke Ellington, Count Basie, Charlie Parker, Dexter Gordon, and others. By age twelve, Miles had begun touring with his father's band, the Bebops. He played with his father's band for several years.

Given the nickname "Buddy" by his aunt after the drummer Buddy Rich, he was often seen as a teenager hanging out and recording at Universal Promotions Corporation recording studios, which later became Rainbow Recording Studios.

In order to become a professional musician, Miles dropped out of Omaha North High in 1965. The school awarded him an honorary degree in 1998.

=== 1960s: Early career ===
Miles played with a variety of rhythm and blues and soul acts as a teenager, including Ruby & the Romantics, the Delfonics, and Wilson Pickett. In 1964, at the age of 16, Miles met Jimi Hendrix at a show in Montreal, where both were performing as sidemen for other artists.

In 1967, Miles joined Hendrix in a jam session at the Malibu home of Stephen Stills. They also went on to play together again in 1968 in both Los Angeles and New York. In the same year, Miles moved to Chicago where he teamed with guitarist Mike Bloomfield and vocalist Nick Gravenites to form the Electric Flag, a blues/soul/rock band. In addition to playing drums, Miles sometimes sang lead vocals for the band, which made its live debut at the Monterey Pop Festival in mid-1967.

In early 1968, the band released A Long Time Comin', its first album for Columbia. The Electric Flag's second album, An American Music Band, followed late the same year. Shortly after that release, the group disbanded. In the same year, Hendrix used several guest artists, including Miles, during the recording of his album, Electric Ladyland. Miles played drums on one long jam that was eventually split into two album cuts, "Rainy Day, Dream Away" and "Still Raining, Still Dreaming", with a different song, "1983... (A Merman I Should Turn to Be)", edited in between.

At age 21, after the breakup of the Electric Flag, Miles put together a new band with Jim McCarty, who later became the guitarist for Cactus. This new group performed and recorded as the Buddy Miles Express. In 1969, Hendrix wrote a short poem as a liner note for Expressway To Your Skull, the first studio album recorded by the Buddy Miles Express. Hendrix went on to produce four of the tracks on the group's follow-up album, Electric Church. The title of the latter LP was taken from Hendrix's poem on the first.

In 1969 he appeared on British jazz guitarist John McLaughlin's album Devotion.

=== 1970s: More bands and collaborations ===
In 1970, after the Buddy Miles Express split up, Miles began a collaboration with Hendrix and bassist Billy Cox. Together, they formed Band of Gypsys, producing one self-titled live album before disbanding.

Later in 1970, while recording the album We Got to Live Together, Miles learned of the death of Hendrix, which he mentioned on the inner cover of the album. Released in 1971, We Got to Live Together was produced by Miles and Robin McBride.

Also in 1971, although the Electric Flag had been inactive for nearly three years, Columbia released a greatest hits album. In 1974, Miles and the Electric Flag re-formed briefly and released another album, The Band Kept Playing, on the Atlantic label.

Miles went on to produce other records as the Buddy Miles Band. One song he had written and recorded with the Band of Gypsys, "Changes", was also recorded by Miles with his own band and released by Mercury Records as "Them Changes" soon after Hendrix's death. Miles' former Band of Gypsys sideman, Billy Cox, performed bass guitar on this track. The band also included bassist David Hull and guitarist Charlie Karp. The Buddy Miles Band's live album again included "Them Changes," which had become Miles' signature song. The song was released a fourth time on a live record Miles recorded with Carlos Santana.

It was mentioned in the February 10 issue of Billboard, in both the From The Music Capitals of the World section and Sam Sutherland's Studio Track section that Mike Bloomfield and Al Kooper were to reunite with Miles to record an album for the Columbia label. It was to be released around mid 1973.

In 1973, Miles recorded an album with the Gun's Adrian Gurvitz called Chapter VII, as well as drummed on a song from Gurvitz's project Three Man Army's album Third of a Lifetime. The Chapter VII album cover included photos of Miles and his family along with some shots of Carlos Santana, Jimi Hendrix, and Sly Stone. In 1974 Miles released All The Faces Of Buddy Miles on CBS produced by Johnny Bristol, an album aimed at the funk and soul market. It included "Pull Yourself Together," which gave Miles a chart placement on the R&B charts when it was issued as a 7" single. Another track, "I'm Just A Kiss Away", was a huge dance hit amongst followers of the UK "rare groove."

Miles was signed by the record label, Casablanca Records. Miles' work for the label included the album released under his own name, More Miles Per Gallon. From that album he had a national hit with, "Rockin' and Rollin' on the Streets of Hollywood". The following year, he released Bicentennial Gathering of the Tribes (1976). The album's liner notes a quote from President John F. Kennedy concerning American Indians. (Note: The quote from President Kennedy included the line "When we neglect the heroic past of the American Indian, we thereby weaken our own heritage".) In the mid 1970s, Miles recorded Roadrunner co-produced by long time friend Jim Paris. In 1980 Paris and Miles re-united, and together they produced Sneak Attack with Miles's new band The Regiment, released by Atlantic Records in 1981.

=== 1980s: The Club Fed Sessions ===
Miles served a prison term for grand theft in the late 1970s and later another term for auto theft in the early 1980s.

In late 1984 and early 1985 while living in a halfway house in Oakland, California, Miles commuted almost daily to San Rafael to collaborate with a handful of musicians and songwriters at the Ice House Studios. Collaborators included Producer Jim Gaines, Pat Craig and Dave Carlson from The Tazmanian Devils, David Jenkins from Pablo Cruise, Bill Craig, Tony Saunders (Merl Saunders' son) and Drew Youngs. The project soon moved to the Record Plant in Sausalito, where the group produced over 15 songs, ranging from funky, soulful grooves to R&B ballads. "Anna", the title song of the proposed album, helped Miles land his next recording job with the California Raisins. However, during the album's production, the Record Plant was seized by the government when its owner was indicted on drug trafficking charges. The musicians and employees working there began calling the studio "Club Fed"; hence the name "The Club Fed Sessions". The album was never released.

In 1986, Miles performed vocals for the California Raisins claymation ad campaign, most notably singing "I Heard It Through the Grapevine", and also performed lead vocals on two California Raisins albums featuring 1960s R&B covers, and a third which featured Christmas tunes. In 1986 and 1987, he rejoined Carlos Santana as a vocalist on Santana's album Freedom. In 1987–1988, Miles moved to Southern California and with a new band toured the California coast, and the Chitlin' Circuit in the U.S. south before disbanding in early 1989.

=== 1990s: Tours and remembering Hendrix ===
While residing in Chicago in 1990, Miles, along with guitarists Kevon Smith and Joe Thomas, formed MST. They recorded Hell and Back in 1994, and toured the US and Europe until 1997. They were also featured in the DVD, Tribute to Jimi Hendrix – CAS (1997)..

In 1992, Miles worked with bassist Bootsy Collins and guitarist Steve Salas under the supergroup moniker Hardware, which released one album called Third Eye Open.

In 1993, Miles, Billy Cox, and Riki Hendrix appeared on stage to play at a tribute event for Jimi Hendrix.

From 1994 to 2007, Miles formulated his new version of the Buddy Miles Express in the New York City area, with Charlie Torres on bass guitar and vocals, Rod Kohn on guitar and vocals, Mark "Muggie Doo" Leach on Hammond B3, background vocals, and keyboards, and Kenn Moutenot on drums and vocals and handling management. They toured nearly nonstop in the United States and overseas, with nearly 1000 concerts and festivals to their credit.

In 1997, Miles' album, Miles Away from Home was released. Also in 1997, Miles relocated to Fort Worth, Texas. Soon, he began collaborating with a young guitarist from Dallas, Lance Lopez. He went on to mentor Lopez, co-producing Lopez's debut album, First Things First, with Jay Newland. The Lopez album was released independently in 1999.

Miles was also seen in the Hendrix-family owned official video release, The Making of Electric Ladyland on Rhino Records. The video featured interviews with the majority of players who were involved in recording the album. The video includes footage of Miles playing his drum tracks in the studio against the original multi-track recordings of Hendrix. In 1999, Miles performed on the late Bruce Cameron's album, Midnight Daydream, which included other Hendrix alumni Billy Cox, Mitch Mitchell, Jack Bruce, and others.

=== 2000s: Final albums and unreleased songs ===
In 2000, Miles and Leach collaborated with Stevie Ray Vaughan's "Double Trouble" rhythm section, creating the Buddy Miles Blues Berries album which featured Rocky Athas of Black Oak Arkansas. This lineup also contributed a cover of Hendrix's "The Wind Cries Mary" on the Blue Haze: Songs of Jimi Hendrix album in 2001. In addition, Miles also composed and recorded many songs with this new version of the Buddy Miles Express that are yet to be released. It was Miles' most enduring live band, with the touring lineup continuing for six years with the same members.

The band continued on with Miles and Leach and a host of other players until Miles's passing. The Miles/Leach duo, along with sax man Patrick Gage and bassist Dave Blackerby, also released the Buddy Miles Express' final album, Road to Sturgis, a benefit CD for the Children's Craniofacial Foundation. Miles and Leach continued writing new but unreleased music until just days before Miles' passing.

Also in 2004, Miles reunited yet again with Billy Cox of the Band of Gypsys to re-record songs from the original 1970 live album with guitarists Eric Gales, Kenny Olsen, Sheldon Reynolds, Andy Aledort and Gary Serkin. The album, titled The Band of Gypsys Return was released in 2006. Until his death, Miles continued to be active musically and performed many shows with proceeds going to help support victims of natural disasters and other charitable causes.

== Friendship and collaboration with Jimi Hendrix ==
Miles stated that between late September and mid-October 1969, "Jimi was not happy. He felt powerless. He couldn't do what he wanted to do". In mid-October 1969, Hendrix founded a short-lived band called Band of Gypsys, which Miles would join. Alan Douglas and Stephan Bright were initially brought in to produce their recording sessions, but bassist Billy Cox clashed with the pair, deeming them unworthy. Cox stormed out of the sessions after a furious row with Bright and went home to Nashville for two weeks, before being coaxed back. At the end of Douglas and Bright's one-and-a-half months together, they had only produced one usable backing track, "Room Full of Mirrors". Douglas and Bright resigned, stating pressures from the record label, Hendrix's manager Michael Jeffery, and Hendrix's own "lack of interest".

The same day Douglas resigned, Hendrix signed the contract with Bill Graham for two dates at the Fillmore East. Hendrix had been talking about a Band of Gypsys "jam" LP since late 1968, after the settlement with Ed Chalpin. The recording of the Fillmore East concert was initially a single LP, but additional cuts from the concerts have been released on a double CD, Live at the Fillmore East. During the 2 1/2 months before the two nights' worth of recordings for the LP, the band rehearsed and recorded in New York City. (Note: The place that the band rehearsed and recorded was Hendrix and his management's apartment. It was also the place where he was building his Electric Lady studio.) Hendrix was required to give his next LP to Chalpin to be released by the Capitol Records label, but he had become entangled in litigation concerning the contract with Chalpin's PPX record company that he had signed, his agreement with Jeffery and Chandler prior to the contract, and becoming internationally recognized. This fact led to Miles and Billy Cox being hired as full-time employees for the duration of the three-month collaboration called the 'Band of Gypsys'. In the end, the band produced the LP for Chalpin and Capitol, as well as a single for Reprise.

During a one-off charity event for the Moratorium to End the War in Vietnam committee a month later, Hendrix had a minor meltdown on stage. Speculations include a possibly drug-related meltdown on stage, as well as an act of sabotage on the part of Jeffery. Miles said about the incident years later, "Jeffery slipped [Hendrix] two half-tabs of acid on stage as he went on... [Hendrix] just freaked out. I told Jeffery he was an out-and-out complete idiot... One of the biggest reasons why Jimi is dead is because of that guy." Miles and Jeffery already had a strained relationship, as Jeffery was uncomfortable with Hendrix's and Miles' close friendship. After this one-off charity event at Madison Square Garden in January 1970, Jeffery told Miles that he was fired and the Band of Gypsys was no more. Although Cox, and presumably Miles as well, had already been paid off as full-time salaried employees with a $1,000 bonus for their services the week before.

While with Hendrix, Miles recorded a number of jams, demos, and songs. Over the years, more material recorded at the Fillmore East on New Years 1969–1970 has been issued. In 2019, the complete performances from all four shows were released on the box set Songs for Groovy Children: The Fillmore East Concerts. The original versions of "Stepping Stone" and "Izabella", songs which he recorded for the 1970 single with Cox and Hendrix, were restored and included on the 2001 compilation Voodoo Child: The Jimi Hendrix Collection. Three other songs that were recorded with Cox and Hendrix were used for early posthumous Hendrix albums, including The Cry of Love and Rainbow Bridge. Additional studio recordings by the trio in various stages of development were released on South Saturn Delta, The Jimi Hendrix Experience box set, Burning Desire, West Coast Seattle Boy: The Jimi Hendrix Anthology, and People, Hell and Angels.

== Death and legacy ==
At the age of 60, Buddy Miles died on February 26, 2008, at his home in Austin, Texas, with his family by his side. According to his website, he died of congestive heart disease. Miles was cremated, and there was no funeral.

The day before Miles died, he heard Steve Winwood and Eric Clapton playing "Them Changes" at Madison Square Garden through his cell phone. "Them Changes" is now part of Clapton's set on tour as a tribute to Miles. The UK-based newspaper The Independent ran an almost full-page obituary in its Friday, February 29, 2008, edition.

Asked how he would like to be remembered by the American music magazine Seconds in 1995, Miles simply said: "The baddest of the bad. People say I'm the baddest drummer. If that's true, thank you world." A memorial concert took place on March 30, 2008, at Threadgill's on Riverside Drive, South Austin that included performances by Bernie Worrell, The Family Stone Project, Doug Pinnick, Cyril Neville, The Sixth Chamber and surviving members of the Buddy Miles Express.

On June 23, 2019, Buddy Miles was inducted into the National Rhythm and Blues Hall of Fame in Detroit, Michigan as a part of the Band of Gypsys, along with Jimi Hendrix and Billy Cox.

On October 6, 2024, Buddy Miles was inducted into the National Rhythm and Blues Hall of Fame in Cleveland, Ohio as a solo artist.

== Discography ==
=== As leader ===
Year	Album	US	USR&B	CA	GE	NDL	UK	Certification	Label
1968	Expressway to Your Skull (as Buddy Miles Express)	—	—	—	—	—	—		Mercury
1969	Electric Church (as Buddy Miles Express)	145	—	—	—	—	—		Mercury
1970	Them Changes	35	14	27	—	—	—		Mercury
1970	We Got to Live Together	53	14	46	—	—	—		Mercury
1971	A Message to the People	60	12	73	—	—	—		Mercury
1971	Buddy Miles "Live"	50	10	37	—	—	—		Mercury
1972	Carlos Santana & Buddy Miles! Live!	8	6	15	14	6	29	US: Platinum	Columbia
1973	Chapter VII	123	36	—	—	—	—		Columbia
1973	Booger Bear (as Buddy Miles Express)	194	47	—	—	—	—		Columbia
1974	All the Faces of Buddy Miles	—	—	—	—	—	—		Columbia
1975	More Miles Per Gallon	68	27	—	—	—	—		Casablanca
1976	Bicentennial Gathering of the Tribes	—	—	—	—	—	—		Casablanca
1977	Roadrunner	—	—	—	—	—	—		T-Town
1981	Sneak Attack	—	—	—	—	—	—		Atlantic
1987	Sing the Hit Songs (with The California Raisins)	—	—	—	—	—	—		Priority
1988	Sweet, Delicious, & Marvelous (with The California Raisins)	140	—	—	—	—	—		Priority
1988	Meet the Raisins! (with The California Raisins)	—	—	—	—	—	—		Atlantic
1988	Christmas with the California Raisins (with The California Raisins)	—	—	—	—	—	—		Priority
1994	Hell and Back (as Buddy Miles Express)	—	—	—	—	—	—		Rykodisc
1997	Tribute to Jimi Hendrix	—	—	—	—	—	—		Pavement
1997	The Best of Buddy Miles (compilation)	—	—	—	—	—	—		Mercury/Polygram
1998	Miles Away from Home	—	—	—	—	—	—		Hip-O
2002	Blues Berries (with Rocky Athas)	—	—	—	—	—	—		Ruf
2004	Changes	—	—	—	—	—	—		SPV
2006	The Band of Gypsys Return (with Billy Cox)	—	—	—	—	—	—		Image Entertainment

=== Jimi Hendrix albums ===
- Electric Ladyland – drums on "Rainy Day, Dream Away" and "Still Raining, Still Dreaming" (1968)
- Band of Gypsys – drums and vocals (1970)
- The Cry of Love – drums on "Ezy Ryder" (1971)
- Rainbow Bridge – drums and vocals on "Earth Blues" and "Room Full of Mirrors" (1971)
- War Heroes – drums on "Izabella" (1972)
- Loose Ends – drums and vocals on "Blue Suede Shoes", "Burning Desire", and "I'm Your Hoochie Coochie Man" (1974)
- Crash Landing – drums and vocals on "Message to Love" and "Power of Soul" (1975)
- Nine to the Universe – drums on "Nine to the Universe" and "Young/Hendrix" (1980)
- The Baggy's Rehearsal Sessions – drums and vocals (2002)
- Songs for Groovy Children: The Fillmore East Concerts – drums and vocals (2019)

=== Collaborative ===
- The Electric Flag – A Long Time Comin' – Columbia CS-9597 (1968)
- The Electric Flag – An American Music Band – Columbia CS-9714 (1968)
- Muddy Waters – Fathers and Sons – Chess LPS-127 [2LP] (1969)
- John McLaughlin – Devotion – Douglas KZ-31568 (1970)
- The Best of The Electric Flag – Columbia C-30422 (1971) compilation
- The Electric Flag – The Band Kept Playing – Atlantic SD-18112 (1974)
- Jeff Berlin – Pump It! – Passport Jazz PJ-88017 (1986)
- Hardware – Third Eye Open – Rykodisc RCD-10304 (1992) with Stevie Salas, Bootsy Collins
- The Band of Gypsys Return – Image (2006) with Billy Cox
