= Maxayn Lewis =

American singer

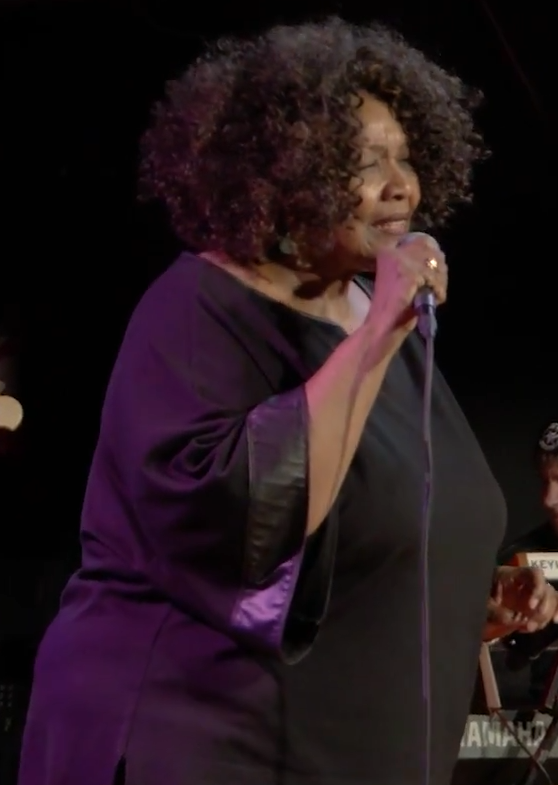

Background information
- Also known as: Maxayne Moriguchi; Maxayane Lewis; Maxanne Lewis; Maxayne Lewis; Maxann Lewis
- Born: Paulette Parker; Tulsa, Oklahoma, U.S.
- Genres: Soul, R&B, funk, pop, rock
- Occupations: Singer-songwriter, musician, producer
- Instruments: Vocals, piano
- Years active: 1960s – present
- Label: Duke Records
- Website: theabrahamscompany.com/maxaynlewis

Maxayn Lewis is an American soul singer, musician, songwriter, and producer. She began her career in the 1960s, under her birth name Paulette Parker, as member of the Ikettes in the Ike & Tina Turner Revue. In the 1970s, Lewis sang lead in the band Maxayn with her then-husband Andre Lewis. She was described as "a cross between Aretha Franklin and Roberta Flack." The group eventually morphed to Mandré.

Lewis is also a prolific backing vocalist. She has sung with various acts, including The Gap Band, Donna Summer, Ray Charles, Celine Dion, Johnny "Guitar" Watson, Bonnie Raitt, Simple Minds, Duran Duran, Smokey Robinson, Ricky Martin, and Britney Spears.

== Life and career ==
Lewis was born Paulette Parker, the first of four children to Emzie and Lorene Parker in Tulsa, Oklahoma. Growing up in Greenwood, she listened to Duke Ellington, Muddy Waters, Mahalia Jackson, Sarah Vaughan, and Ella Fitzgerald. In the fifth grade, Parker created an all-female singing group called The Continentals.

She became a conservatory-trained pianist and attended Oklahoma State University where she studied sociology and psychology. Parker left the school after she was assaulted by a white male on campus. She became depressed after the incident, but soon she was offered an opportunity to sing as part of a nightclub act with a white male vocalist, Karl Day, booked as "Night and Day".

While Parker was performing at The Alley nightclub, she received a call from Ike Turner to set up an audition for a position as an Ikette. She auditioned for him when Ike & Tina Turner were in Independence, Kansas for a concert in 1967, and was hired on the spot. Turner met with her parents to get their blessings to go on tour. Parker spent over a year as an Ikettes and credits the Turners, particularly Ike Turner who she described as an "excellent businessman," for educating her on show business. "We were really well paid. Ike would read the contracts to us and tell us what a rider was. He asked 'Do you understand?' He would teach us what each part of the contract meant, so that we were all in it together," she said.

After her tenure as an Ikette, she embarked on a blues festival tour with Bobby "Blue" Bland. She released two singles as Paulette Parker on Duke Records in 1969. Through Bland's bandleader, Ernie Fields Jr., she met her musician Andre Lewis, who she would marry. She declined the chance to be produced by Donny Hathaway, opting to form a band with her husband. Now going by the name Maxayn Lewis, their band was named after her, Maxayn. The name Maxayn came from her uncle who called her goddess of the wind when she sang. She said: "I'm from Oklahoma so Native culture was always big. In the Mayan culture there was a Goddess of the Wind named Maxayn." Inspired by Tina Turner, she "wanted to have one name, like Tina, that one-name identity." The band Maxayn consisted of her singing lead, Andre Lewis (synthesizers), Marlo Henderson (guitar), and Emry Thomas (drums). They issued three albums on Capricorn Records: Maxayn (1972), Mindful (1973, US R&B No. 43), and Bail Out for Fun! (1974). The band moved to Manticore Records in 1975 and were working on a fourth album when issues with the label caused them to abandon the project. Later that year, the band signed to Motown but soon disbanded.

Andre Lewis subsequently released three disco funk albums under the name Mandré—a moniker combining his own name with that of singer Maxayn—with Maxayn Lewis contributing songwriting to his projects.

Lewis later co-wrote "So Much More" by Ramsey Lewis and "We Belong Together" by Rockie Robbins, both songs reached the Billboard R&B chart. Lewis toured as a backing vocalist with Gino Vannelli, Donna Summer, and Rufus. She provided background vocals for the soundtrack of the film Grease (1978). She also sang backup on albums for Steve Marriott, Sammy Hagar, The Gap Band, Rosanne Cash, Rita Coolidge, B.B. King, and Namie Amuro. She sang the track "Turn You On" on the soundtrack of the film Peeples (2013). Lewis performed most of the singing for Ma Rainey (played by Viola Davis) in the film Ma Rainey's Black Bottom (2020).

For a while Lewis lived in Tokyo; she currently lives in Los Angeles.

== Discography ==
=== Singles ===
- 1969: "(Gimme Back) My Love" / "Should I Let Him Go" (Duke 451)
- 1969: "I Pity The Fool" / "Driving Wheel" (Duke 455)

=== Backing vocal credits ===
- 1972: High Voltage – High Voltage
- 1973: D. J. Rogers – D. J. Rogers
- 1975: Bonnie Raitt – Home Plate
- 1976: Steve Marriott – Marriott
- 1976: Sammy Hagar – Nine on a Ten Scale
- 1977: Bonnie Raitt – Sweet Forgiveness
- 1977: Van Morrison – A Period Of Transition
- 1978: Tina Turner – Rough
- 1978: Grease (Original Motion Picture Soundtrack)
- 1979: Billy Preston – Late At Night
- 1979: Rufus – Numbers
- 1979: Bonnie Raitt – The Glow
- 1979: Lowell George – Thanks I'll Eat It Here
- 1980: The Gap Band – The Gap Band III
- 1981: Rosanne Cash– Seven Year Ache
- 1982: Rosanne Cash – Somewhere in the Stars
- 1982: The Gap Band – Gap Band IV
- 1983: The Gap Band – Gap Band V: Jammin'
- 1984: Bobby Bland – You've Got Me Loving You
- 1985: Morris Day – Color Of Success
- 1987: Smokey Robinson – One Heartbeat
- 1987: Donna Summer– All Systems Go
- 1987: Morris Day – Daydreaming
- 1987: Tower of Power – Power
- 1988: Brenda Russell – Get Here
- 1990: Gino Vannelli – Inconsolable Man
- 1992: Rita Coolidge – Love Lessons
- 1993: B.B. King – Blues Summit
- 1993: Ray Charles – My World
- 1994: Johnny "Guitar" Watson – Bow Wow
- 1994: Kathy Troccoli – Kathy Troccoli
- 1994: Chanté Moore – A Love Supreme
- 1995: Duran Duran – Thank You
- 1995: Simple Minds – Good News from the Next World
- 1995: Ricky Martin – A Medio Vivir
- 1996: Celine Dion – Falling into You
- 1997: Boney James - Sweet Thing
- 1999: The Gap Band – Y2K: Funkin' Till 2000 Comz
- 2000: Namie Amuro – Genius 2000
- 2000: The Doobie Brothers – Sibling Rivalry
- 2000: Namie Amuro – Break the Rules
- 2001: Rollins Band – Nice
- 2001: Britney Spears – Britney
- 2002: Les McCann – Pump It Up
- 2004: Tift Merritt – Tambourine
- 2005: Tift Merritt – Stray Paper
- 2007: Jerry Lee Lewis – Last Man Standing Live
- 2007: Ai – Don't Stop Ai
- 2011: Jude Johnstone – Quiet Girl
- 2015: Ben Haenow – Ben Haenow
- 2018: Jay-Bee & The Ultratone All-Stars – Life ain't got no shortcuts
- 2019: Coco Montoya – Coming In Hot

=== Instrumental credits ===
- 1972: Maxayn – Maxayn
- 1972: Labelle – Moon Shadow
- 1973: Maxayn – Mindful
- 1974: Maxayn – Bail Out For Fun!
- 1979: Wornell Jones – You Are My Happiness
- 1983: Earth, Wind & Fire – Powerlight
- 1990: Pizzicato Five – Soft Landing On The Moon
