= It's Good to Be Alive =

It's (or It Is) Good to Be Alive may refer to:

== Music ==
- It's Good to Be Alive (album), an album by D. J. Rogers
  - "It's Good to Be Alive", a song by D. J. Rogers
- It's Good to Be Alive, an album by Michael Saxell
- "It's Good to Be Alive", a song from an album Manfred Mann Chapter Three Volume Two by Manfred Mann Chapter Three
- "It's Good to Be Alive", a 1957 song written by Bob Merrill
- "It's Good to Be Alive", a song from the theatrical musical New Girl in Town
- "It's Good to Be Alive", a song from the theatrical musical Desperate Measures (musical)
- "Tänk va' skönt", a Swedish version of "It's Good To Be Alive", from album Som jag är by Agnetha Fältskog

== Other uses ==
- It's Good to Be Alive, a 1959 autobiography by Roy Campanella that related his recovery from his 1958 automobile accident
  - It's Good to Be Alive (film), a television film adaptation of the book directed by Michael Landon
- Dis Lekker om te Lewe, also known as It's Good to Be Alive, a South African film, starring Al Debbo

== See also ==
- It's Great to Be Alive (disambiguation)
- Good to Be Alive (disambiguation)
