= D. J. Rogers (album) =

Studio album by D. J. Rogers
- Released: 1973
- Recorded: 1973
- Genre: Soul; funk
- Length: 39:34
- Label: Shelter
- Producer: D. J. Rogers

D. J. Rogers chronology
| D. J. Rogers (1973) | It's Good to Be Alive (1975) |

D. J. Rogers is the debut album by D. J. Rogers, released in 1973 on Shelter Records. This was the only album released on Shelter by Rogers before moving on to RCA Records.

== Critical reception ==
Professional ratings
Review scores
| Source | Rating |
|---|---|
| AllMusic | 4/5 stars |
| Asbury Park Press | (favourable) |
| Omaha World Herald | (favourable) |
| The Record | (favourable) |

Don Lass of the Asbury Park Press wrote "D.J. Rogers is into modern R&B and soul on his debut album, titled simply D.J. Rogers (SW-8915), and it shows that he has the potential of reaching the top of the ladder in his field. His 'Watch for the Riders' and 'March On' have hit possibilities." With a four out of five stars rating Stephen Cook of Allmusic called the album "A soul classic". Will Smith of the Omaha World Herald stated "Singer D.J. Rogers conveys more of a blues feeling than many current soul vocalists. His D.J. Rogers (Shelter-SW 895) is a fully realized and nicely varied collection. It's a welcome respite from the run-of-the-mill soul offerings." Rick Atkinson of The Record remarked that "D J. Rogers opens the show for Leon Russell on tour, and he's now represented by an album called D J Rogers. He is basically an R&B artist, and at his best he can be used as a definition of the word 'Soul'. On his album he is at his best, especially with material like 'March On' and 'Celebration'."

== Track listing ==
All songs written and arranged by D. J. Rogers

1. "Listen to the Message" – 3:43
2. "Where There's a Will" – 3:27
3. "Take Time" – 5:12
4. "Watch Out for the Riders" – 3:11
5. "March On" – 3:09
6. "Celebration" – 3:52
7. "It's All Over" – 4:33
8. "Don't You Want to Ride" – 8:07
9. "Bail Out" – 4:20

== Personnel ==
- D. J. Rogers - vocals, backing vocals
- Fred Allen – drums
- Patricia Hall – backing vocals
- Keith Hatchell – bass
- Marlo Henderson – guitar, backing vocals
- Andre Lewis – bass, backing vocals
- Maxayn Lewis – backing vocals
- Kenneth Loper – organ
- Clarence McDonald – piano; string and horn arrangements on "Take Time", "Watch Out for the Riders" and "It's All Over"
- Scott Sansby - drums
- Marsha Smith – backing vocals
- Rhonghea Southern – rhythm guitar, backing vocals
- Sidigi Southern – backing vocals
- E.T. Thomas – drums
- David T. Walker – guitar
- Lalomie Washburn – backing vocals
- Bobby Watson (from Rufus) – bass
- Ron Woods – drums
- Stanley Lee Ensemble - backing vocals

Technical

- Andrea Cohen - cover photography
