= Love Brought Me Back =

Studio album by D. J. Rogers
- Released: 1978
- Recorded: 1978
- Studio: Total Experience Recording Studio (Hollywood, California) and Bolic Sound (Inglewood, California)
- Genre: Soul; funk
- Label: Columbia
- Producer: D. J. Rogers

D. J. Rogers chronology
Love, Music and Life (1977)	Love Brought Me Back (1978)	Trust Me (1979)

Love Brought Me Back is the fifth album by D. J. Rogers, released in 1978. It was recorded at Bolic Sound and Total Experience Recording Studio. It was Rogers' first Columbia Records album.

== Chart performance ==
The album peaked at No. 54 on the Billboard Top Soul Albums chart. The singles "Love Brought Me Back" and "All My Love" charted on the Billboard R&B chart, reaching #20 and #87 respectively.

== Critical reception ==
Professional ratings
Review scores
Source	Rating
AllMusic	2.5/5 stars
Omaha World-Herald	4/5 stars

Will Smith of the Omaha World-Herald wrote: "A note bending, gospel based direction akin to Stevie Wonder's is the product of singer D.J. Rogers. The uplifting nature of Rogers' tunes, lyrics and arrangements makes "Love Brought Me Back" (Columbia JC 35393) special." Sam Caputo of the Courier News wrote: "I haven't heard a more solid album of soul music in a long time. D.J. Rogers has been making albums for years but has not garnered the all-encompassing fame of Stevie Wonder, whose music his resembles. Rogers is completely responsible for the resemblance (although he may not be aware of it) as he sang, composed, arranged, produced, conducted and played keyboard for the entire album." Caputo added "The album is great for dancing and Rogers writes lyrics which are slightly better than Stevie's." Elton Alexander of the Dayton Daily News said: "Not bad stuff. Produced, written, arranged and conducted by Mr. Rogers, this platter will do well in any record collection. A lot of brass and hard-driving soul, especially in the title tune. This man has some talent and displays it well."

== Track listing ==
All songs written by D. J. Rogers except where indicated

1. "Love Brought Me Back" - 5:29
2. "Joy from You" - 2:49
3. "When Love Is Gone" - 5:25
4. "Yesterday Never Returns" - 3:40
5. "Sold on You" - 4:39
6. "You Take Me Higher (Brazilian Lover)" - 3:28
7. "Hold Me" - 3:29
8. "All My Love" - 5:58
9. "Changed" (Walter Hawkins) - 2:18

== Personnel ==
- D. J. Rogers - clavinet, fender rhodes, Yamaha electric piano, Yamaha concert grand piano, lead and backing vocals
- Keni Burke - bass
- Patrice Rushen - synthesizer
- James Gadson - drums
- Jerry Peters - piano
- Paulinho Da Costa - percussion
- Michael Wycoff - organ, piano, vocals
- Marlo Henderson, Charles Bynum - guitar
- Robert Lynn Wilson - bass, background vocals
- Claude Wilson, Ronnie Wilson, Nolan Andrew Smith, Ray Brown - trumpet
- David Majal Li - tenor saxophone
- Deniece Williams, Mary Russell, Charlie Wilson, Maxayn Lewis, Mary Ann Lindsay, Phyllis Lindsey, Joseph Greene, Anita Anderson, Jesse Kirkland - backing vocals

== Charts ==
Chart (1978)	Peak position
Top Soul Albums	54

=== Singles ===
Year	Single	Chart positions
Year	Single	US R&B
1978	"All My Love"	87
1978	"Love Brought Me Back"	20
