= Say You Love Me =

Say You Love Me may refer to:

== Music ==
=== Albums ===
- Say You Love Me (album), by Jennifer Holliday, 1985

=== Songs ===
- "Say You Love Me" (Char Avell song), 2012
- "Say You Love Me" (Fleetwood Mac song), 1975
- "Say You Love Me" (Simply Red song), from Blue, 1998
- "Say You Love Me" (Jessie Ware song), 2014
- "Say You Love Me", a song by Chris Brown and Young Thug, 2020
- "Say You Love Me", a song by Twice from Yes or Yes, 2018
- "Say You Love Me", a song by Dessie O'Halloran, 2001
- "Say You Love Me", a song by Demis Roussos, 1974
- "Say You Love Me", a song by The Dukays, 1964
- "Say You Love Me", a song by Rick Nelson, 1965
- "Say You Love Me", a song by Harold Burrage, 1960
- "Say You Love Me", a song by Percy Mayfield, 1961
- "Say You Love Me", a song by Jo-El Sonnier, 1988
- "Say You Love Me", a song by John Lodge, 1977
- "Say You Love Me", a song by Lime, 1985
- "Say You Love Me", a song by Norman Connors and Starship Orchestra, 1978
- "Say You Love Me", a song by Natalie Cole from Snowfall on the Sahara, 1999
- "Say You Love Me", a song by Patti Austin from End of a Rainbow, 1976
- "Say You Love Me", a song by Rodney Crowell from Jewel of the South, 1995
- "Say You Love Me", a song by Serena Onasis, 2013
- "Say You Love Me," a song by D. J. Rogers from It's Good to Be Alive, 1975
- "Say You Love Me", a song by Toni Gonzaga from All Me, 2010
- "Say You Love Me", a song by James Sampson, placed 9th in Dansk Melodi Grand Prix 2007, Denmark in the Eurovision Song Contest 2007
- "Say You Love Me", a song by 2 Quick Start that placed 8th in the national final of Estonia in the Eurovision Song Contest 1999
- "Say You Love Me", a song by David Coverdale from Northwinds, 1978
- "Say You Love Me", a song by Sizzla from Riddim Driven: X5, 2002
- Shuō Nǐ Ài Wǒ, "Say You Love Me", a song by Sherman Chung from Good Girl, 2007
- Shuō Nǐ Ài Wǒ, "Say You Love Me" (說你愛我), a song by S.H.E from Play, 2007
- Shuō Nǐ Ài Wǒ, "說你愛我" (Say You Love Me), a song by Wilber Pan from Play It Cool, 2007
- "Say You Love Me", an Arabic song by Massari, 2008
- "Say You Love Me", a song by Little Jimmy Rivers and the Tops, 1959
- "Say You Love Me or Say Goodnight", a song by REO Speedwagon from You Can Tune a Piano, but You Can't Tuna Fish, 1978

== Other uses ==
- "Say You Love Me", a poem by Molly Peacock from The Best American Poetry 1999
- Say You Love Me, a 2004 Korean TV series starring Kim Rae-won

== See also ==
- Don't Say You Love Me (disambiguation)
- "You Don't Have to Say You Love Me", a song by Dusty Springfield
- "Mehbooba Mehbooba", a remake by R. D. Burman of the 1974 Demis Roussos song, for the 1975 Indian film Sholay
