= High Voltage (High Voltage album) =

Studio album by High Voltage
- Released: 1972
- Studio: Columbia Studios, Hollywood
- Genres: Rock, funk
- Label: Columbia KC 31376
- Producer: Frank Cook

High Voltage is a 1972 album by the funk rock group High Voltage. The album and single were well-received by the major music trade magazines that year.

== Background ==
High Voltage was fronted by Lalomie Washburn who had previously shared the bill with artists cuch as Ike and Tina Turner. The group released one album before breaking up. The self-titled album was released on Columbia KC31376 in 1972.

== Reception ==
The album was one of the Special Merit Picks in the 26 August issue of Billboard where it was given a very good review with the reviewer calling it powerful but not overpowering. The tracks selected for mention were, "Everybody Is an Only Child", "Love Hate" and "Let Me Ride".

In later years, Trakbuv reviewed the album for Funk My Soul where it was referred to as an important LP with a raw and funky sound and it was reminiscent of Rufus's debut album. The album also had musicians playing on it who were from Maxayn and would be in Rufus.

== Airplay ==
The tracks seeing action at WKTK-FM for the week of 26 August were "Save Me", "Crumbs Off the Table" and "Country Road. It was also seeing play action at WKTK-FM in Baltimore.

== Sales ==
According to the Retail Report in the 16 September issue of Record World, the album was one of the ten albums seeing action at Foley's in Houston.

== Single ==
The group covered a Mark Farner song "Country Road". The record was given a good review in the 7 October issue of Cash Box. The reviewer wrote that High Voltage were the exact words that summed up all of what was contained in the single and it should electrify all of the Top 40 stations.

The single was one of the Record World Single Picks for the week of 7 October. The reviewer wrote that the song's title didn't give much of an indication of the rocking horn sound that was in the grooves. The advice was to get down and get with it.

In the 18 November issue of Record World, Kal Rudman had "Country Road" as the Super left-field pick of the week. He said that the track was "black" even though he thought that High Voltage was a white group. It was perfect for discotheque. He said that the brass was the best thing since Chicago and there was no doubt in his mind that Columbia would break it in R&B.

== Track listing ==
=== A ===
1. "Country Road", M. Farner - 3:35
2. "Love Hate", F. Allen - 2:57
3. "What Can We Do", M. A. Lewis - 3:03
4. "Save Me", D. Greer, G. Jackson - 3:36
5. "Crazy", M. Fugate - 7:25

=== B ===
1. "Limbo", W. B. McPherson - 3:00
2. "Be", M. Fugate - 3:05
3. "Crumbs Off the Table", E. Wayne, R. Dunbar, S. Payne - 3:47
4. "Everybody Is an Only Child", A. O'Day - 4:17
5. "Roller", W. B. McPherson - 3:08
6. "Let Me Ride", J. Taylor - 2:37

== Album details ==
=== Musicians ===
- Bass - Bobby Watson
- Drums - Fred Allen
- Guitar - Marlo Henderson
- Guitar - Tony Maiden
- Flute - Billy McPherson
- Organ - Andre Lewis
- Piano - Billy McPherson
- Clarinet - Billy McPherson
- Sax - Mark Williams
- Sax - Billy McPherson
- Trumpet - Chuck Findley
- Trumpet - Chuck Garnett
- Background vocals - Maxayn Lewis
- Vocals - Tony Maiden
- Vocals- LaLomie Washburn

=== Other ===
- Producer – Frank Cook
- Arranger – Billy McPherson, Mark Williams
- Arranger (horns, strings) – Mark Williams (Track 9)
- Engineer – George Beauregard, Sy Mitchell
- Artwork – Joe Garnett
- Design – Nancy Donald
- Photography – Ellen Landweber, Gary Licastro
- Mastered At Customatrix
- Remixed At Sound Labs, Hollywood
- Recorded At Columbia Studios, Hollywood
- Phonographic Copyright (p) CBS Inc
