= Andre Lewis (musician) =

- Also known as: Mandré; The Masked Marauder
- Born: Michael Andre Lewis; December 7, 1948
- Origin: Omaha, Nebraska, U.S.
- Died: January 31, 2012 (aged 63) Shreveport, Louisiana, U.S.
- Genres: Funk, rock rhythm and blues, blues electronic music
- Occupations: Musician, record producer
- Instruments: synthesizer, keyboards, bass
- Years active: 1970s - 1980s
- Labels: Motown Records; Rush Hour; Mirror's Cage Records
- Formerly of: The Mike Lewis Quartet, Andre Lewis and the New Breed, Henry Peters & The Imperials, The Buddy Miles band, Maxayn, High Voltage, Roky Erickson and the Aliens, Buddy Miles and the Mighty Rhythm Tribe

Michael Andre Lewis, a.k.a. Mandré, (December 7, 1948 in Omaha, Nebraska – January 31, 2012 in Shreveport, Louisiana) was an American musician known for his synthesizer recordings at Motown. As Andre Lewis he also contributed to Labelle's Moon Shadow and Whitney Houston's Just Whitney. He toured or recorded with Grant Green, The Who, Labelle, Buddy Miles Band, Maxayn, Rufus, White Chocolate, Earth Wind and Fire and Frank Zappa. He was also band leader for Johnny "Guitar" Watson.

His debut single as Mandré "Solar Flight (Opus I)", was a hit from a self-titled debut album Mandré. He formerly played with his band Maxayn, named after the singer, and later his wife, Maxayn Lewis, (born Paulette Parker).

== Career ==
=== 1960s ===
During the 1960s, Lewis led the group, The New Breed a.k.a. Andre Lewis and the New Breed. The band also included Stemsy Hunter, Hoshal Wright, Jerry Bennett, Hank Redd and Curly Martin.

=== 1970s ===
Andre Lewis made a significant contribution to Buddy Miles' Them Changes album which was released in 1970. He played organ on "Heart’s Delight", organ and clavinet on "Dreams" and contributed backing vocals, organ, clavinet and backing vocals on "Down by the River", and organ on "Your Feeling Is Mine". He also co-wrote the track "Paul B. Allen, Omaha, Nebraska" with Buddy Miles. He was the arranger for that track.

Lewis' group Maxayn played at the Whisky A Go Go in 1972. Both Maxayn's performance as well as the performance by Sparks was reviewed in the 20 May issue of Cash Box. The reviewer noted that Lewis was impressive on bass and played a Billy Preston-ish type organ. Lewis also alternated between lead vocals and electric piano.

Along with wife Maxayn Lewis and Marlo Henderson, Andre Lewis was a part of the group High Voltage who released a self-titled album and a single in 1972 on the Columbia label.

=== 1980s - 1990s ===
Lewis was part of the Buddy Miles and the Mighty Rhythm Tribe project. It also included Marlo Henderson and his fellow Ohama musicians, Stemsy Hunter and Bill Rich. He played on the 1993 album release and contributed to some of the compositions.

== Discography ==
=== Albums ===
- Mandré - 1977
- Mandré Two - 1978
- M3000 - 1979
- Mandré 4 - 1982

=== Singles ===
- "Solar Flight (Opus 1)" 1977
- "Keep Tryin'" 1977
- "Maxymus Lyte" (Opus III) 1978
- "Fair Game" 1978
- "Light Years" (Opus IV) 1978
- "Spirit Groove" 1979
- "Freakin's Fine" 1979
