= Peeples (film) =

2013 American comedy movie

- Theatrical film poster
- Directed by: Tina Gordon Chism
- Written by: Tina Gordon Chism
- Produced by: Tyler Perry; Stephanie Allain; Ozzie Areu; Paul Hall; Matt Moore
- Starring: Craig Robinson; Kerry Washington; David Alan Grier; S. Epatha Merkerson; Tyler James Williams; Melvin Van Peebles; Diahann Carroll
- Cinematography: Alexander Gruszynski
- Edited by: David Moritz
- Music by: Aaron Zigman
- Production company: 34th Street Films
- Distributed by: Lionsgate
- Release date: May 10, 2013
- Running time: 100 minutes
- Country: United States
- Language: English
- Budget: $15 million
- Box office: $9.3 million

Peeples is a 2013 American romantic comedy film written and directed by Tina Gordon Chism. It stars Craig Robinson and Kerry Washington and was released by Lionsgate on May 10, 2013. Despite being billed as a Tyler Perry film, it is the only movie that he didn't write or direct.

Peeples received mixed reviews from critics and was a box office bomb, only grossing $9.3 million against a $15 million budget.

== Plot ==
The Peeples are an affluent East Coast family celebrating their annual Moby Dick Day reunion at Sag Harbor in the Hamptons. The weekend is interrupted when musician Wade Walker, the fiancé of Grace Peeples, shows up to propose after being goaded by his brother, Chris.

Upon arrival, Wade loses his wallet while being chased by the family dog. At the grocery store, he sees Grace's father Virgil, a judge, talking to a woman later revealed to be the mayor. He also sees Grace's sister, Gloria, with her lover, Meg, who is not known to the family. Wade learns more about Grace, including about her ex-boyfriends, breast implants, and mother, Daphne, who is a former singer and recovering alcoholic. Wade attempts to propose at dinner, asking everyone to say what they love about the people in their lives. This ends abruptly when Virgil says he had to pay for Wade at the store.

Wade goes to see Virgil play at a club but discovers he is not there. In the park near the beach, Wade encounters a group of nudists, which includes Virgil. At the guest house, Wade confronts Grace about her implants, and she is honest. They play "naughty school girl". Virgil peeks through the window and runs off in disgust.

Wade discovers that Grace's musician brother, Simon, is also a thief. While playing through the Peeples's house, Wade finds Daphne's headpiece from her days as a performer and begins to sing while wearing it. He is caught by Virgil. Chris shows up unexpectedly to "help" Wade propose. Because of Chris's borrowed Gamma Phi sweater, Virgil thinks they are fraternity brothers and invites him to stay.

At Nana Peeples's house, Wade gets Daphne to sing, while Virgil watches in disgust. Chris makes advances towards Gloria, angering Meg. Back home, Daphne discovers her expensive earrings have been stolen. Virgil believes Wade is the thief. Wade and Chris are at the bar, where they see Simon talking to an uninterested woman. They follow him into the bathroom and pretend to be thugs, but then tell him to return his mother's earrings and stop stealing. Chris returns to the guest house to find Gloria, while Wade finds Virgil in a sweat tent and tries to bear it for Grace's hand in marriage. Wade ends up burning the tent down.

At the Moby Dick Day celebration, Grace tells Wade he looks terrible and offers him a drink from a thermos with a mushroom drawn on it. The mayor confronts Wade. While Virgil is giving a rendition of Captain Ahab, Wade hallucinates that Virgil is talking to him and charges at him with a harpoon. Wade is knocked unconscious.

Wade wakes up and is insulted by Virgil. Wade wants to head back to New York with Grace and Chris, but Grace wants to stay with her family. Wade and Chris leave. After the brothers depart, Virgil admits he has been swimming with the Humpback Whale non-sexually, Gloria and Meg tell everyone about their relationship, Simon admits to his stealing, and Daphne admits she put mushrooms in her drinks. The dog returns Wade's wallet, and Simon takes Wade's engagement ring out of his pocket.

Grace falls into her mother's arms, realizing Wade was telling the truth. She returns to New York a few days later, without being able to contact Wade. She sees his schedule book and meets him at a kids' museum. Grace apologizes and proposes to Wade. He proposes to her in return. Virgil arrives to accept Wade into the family, and the entire family joins Wade on stage to perform for the children.

== Cast ==
- Craig Robinson as Wade Walker
- Kerry Washington as Grace Peeples
- David Alan Grier as Virgil Peeples
- S. Epatha Merkerson as Daphne Peeples
- Melvin Van Peebles as Grandpa Peeples
- Diahann Carroll as Nana Peeples
- Tyler James Williams as Simon Peeples
- Kali Hawk as Gloria Peeples
- Malcolm Barrett as Chris Walker
- Ana Gasteyer as Mayor Hodge
- Kimrie Lewis-Davis as Meg

== Soundtrack ==
The soundtrack was released May 7, 2013 by Lakeshore Records for MP3 download. It features six tracks used in the film:

1. Craig Robinson – "Speak It (Don't Leak It!)"
2. Tyler James Williams - "Drawers on the Floor"
3. Maxayn Lewis – "Turn You On"
4. Aaron Zigman – "Sweat Lodge"
5. Aaron Zigman – "Run Chickens Run"
6. Craig Robinson, David Alan Grier, & Maxayn Lewis – "Speak It (Don't Leak It!) Reprise"
7. Saida Karoli - "Maria Salome"

== Reception ==
=== Box office ===
Peeples grossed $4.6 in its opening weekend, finishing at No. 4 behind Iron Man 3, The Great Gatsby and Pain & Gain. It made $9.3 million total, the lowest ever for a Tyler Perry production.

=== Critical response ===
On Rotten Tomatoes, the film has an approval rating of 38% based on 61 reviews, with an average rating of 5.2/10. The site's critical consensus reads, "Peeples is a warm, amiable farce that offers a few chuckles but mostly falls back on predictable plotting and an overwrought message." On Metacritic, the film has a score of 52 out of 100, based on 26 critics, indicating "mixed or average reviews". On CinemaScore, audiences gave the film an average grade of "B−" on an A+ to F scale.

== Home media ==
Peeples was released to DVD and Blu-ray on September 10, 2013, and early on August 27 on Video/On-Demand.

== See also ==
- List of black films of the 2010s
