= On the Road Again (D. J. Rogers album) =

On The Road Again

Studio album by D. J. Rogers
- Released: 1976
- Recorded: 1976
- Studio: Studios B and C, RCA's Music Center of the World, Hollywood, California
- Genre: Soul; funk
- Label: RCA
- Producer: D. J. Rogers

D. J. Rogers chronology
It's Good to Be Alive (1975)	On The Road Again (1976)	Love, Music and Life (1977)

Professional ratings
Review scores
Source	Rating
Allmusic	2/5 stars

Released in 1976, On the Road Again is the third album by D. J. Rogers and his second with RCA Records.

== Track listing ==
All songs written by D. J. Rogers, except where indicated.

1. "On the Road Again" - 3:27
2. "One More Day" - 4:14
3. "Love Can Be Found" - 2:58
4. "Let My Life Shine, Part I" - 2:09
5. "Let My Life Shine, Part II" - 4:10
6. "Secret Lady" (D. J. Rogers, Lonnie Simmons) - 3:33
7. "Holding on to Love" (D. J. Rogers, Lonnie Simmons) - 2:57
8. "Girl I Love You" - 3:53
9. "Only While It Lasts" - 3:36
10. "Say You Love Me One More Time" - 2:19

== Personnel ==
- D. J. Rogers – Fender Rhodes, Wurlitzer electric piano, clavinet, grand piano, lead and backing vocals
- Harvey Mason, Jeff Porcaro, Paul Mabry, Richard Calhoun – drums
- James Macon, Marlo Henderson, Michael McGloiry – guitar
- Charles Wilson, Michael Wycoff – organ, backing vocals
- Jerry Peters – piano
- Kenneth Lupper – organ
- Keith Hatchell – bass
- Bob Farrell – electric piano
- George Bohanon – trombone, soloist
- The Gap Band, Al Deville, Carlos Garnett, David Majal Li – horns
- Denise Alexander, Emory Jones, Helena Dixon, New Experience, Rosalind Cash, Rudy Taylor, Steven Hunt – backing vocals

== Charts ==
Chart (1976)	Peak position
US Billboard Top LPs & Tape	175
US Billboard Soul LPs	49

=== Singles ===
Year	Single	Chart positions
Year	Single	US R&B
1976	"Let My Life Shine"	78
