= A Period of Transition =

Studio album by Van Morrison
- Released: April 1977
- Recorded: Autumn 1976 – early winter 1977
- Genre: Folk rock, R&B, funk, blues
- Length: 33:50
- Label: Warner Bros.
- Producer: Van Morrison, Mac Rebennack

Van Morrison chronology
Veedon Fleece (1974)	A Period of Transition (1977)	Wavelength (1978)

Singles from A Period of Transition
- 1. "The Eternal Kansas City" b/w "Joyous Sound" Released: April 1977; 2. "Joyous Sound" b/w "Mechanical Bliss" Released: July 1977

A Period of Transition is the ninth studio album by Northern Irish singer-songwriter Van Morrison, released in 1977 (see 1977 in music). It was his first album in two-and-a-half years. At the time of its release it was received with some disappointment by critics and fans: "Most were hoping for a work of primeval vocal aggression that would challenge the emerging élite of Morrison pretenders, whose ranks included Bruce Springsteen, Bob Seger, Phil Lynott, Graham Parker and Elvis Costello." However, the album is still notable for several major compositions, including "Heavy Connection", "Flamingos Fly", "The Eternal Kansas City" and "Cold Wind in August".

The album was coproduced by Mac Rebennack, who also played keyboards and guitar; he had appeared with Morrison at the 1976 concert filmed as The Last Waltz.

== Recording ==
Clinton Heylin remarks on "Flamingos Fly" and "Joyous Sound": "Just seven songs were recorded [for A Period of Transition] and two of these had already been cut at the Record Plant back in 1975." Both of these versions were included on the 1998 compilation album, The Philosopher's Stone. "Flamingos Fly" was also recorded in 1973 with Jackie DeShannon and appeared on her 2003 reissue album Jackie... Plus, along with three other original Morrison compositions from that recording session. It did not take Morrison long to play the song in concert – a week after the recording session on 18 April 1973, the song featured in a concert in Los Angeles at the Shrine Auditorium. This performance remains the only known live version of the song.

== Composition ==
"You Gotta Make It Through the World" is according to Morrison, "a survival song". Dr. John felt that it had "a real spiritual sound". "It Fills You Up" is an attempt by the singer to explain the inspirational spirit that is often found in his music. "The Eternal Kansas City" is, according to Dr. John, "the song that Van got the whole album hooked up around. It was a real deep thing for him to focus on. It goes from a real ethereal voice sound to a jazz introduction and then into a kind of chunky R&B." The song "Joyous Sound" is described by Brian Hinton as "more like the real Van as he starts to wail and the lyrics describe themselves". Morrison said of the track "Flamingos Fly": "I've done three versions in the studio. I've done it slow, a ballad version. I've done a mid-tempo version and I've done this version. This is the version I like best for release." "Heavy Connection" is said to be "psychic stuff" with the lyrics vague and secret but speaking of a love connection "when you came into my dreams/like from a whisper to a scream". The last song on the album is "Cold Wind in August". Dr. John describes it as a "cross current from forties to seventies music. It's like where Ray Charles left off. It's a real tear-jerker that gets back to the basics of music." "Flamingos Fly" was covered by Sammy Hagar, a year before A Period of Transition was released, on his first solo album Nine on a Ten Scale.

== Critical reception ==
Professional ratings
Review scores
Source	Rating
AllMusic	3/5 stars
The Rolling Stone Album Guide	2/5 stars
Uncut	1/5 stars
The Village Voice	B

In a contemporary review for Rolling Stone, Greil Marcus dismissed the songs as "a lot of neo-R&B huffing and puffing" and said: "Morrison's performances rarely find a focus, almost never hit a groove ... The key to the album's sluggishness is the dullness of the horn charts." Robert Christgau wrote in The Village Voice: "In general this is an unexciting record – but not definitively. It's full of the surprising touches ... that signify talent putting out." Peter Knobler wrote in Crawdaddy: "The agonies of Morrison's earlier works are submerged—not obliterated, mind you, or denied, but not crowding out the obvious pleasure that carries the album forward." The Globe and Mail called A Period of Transition "a fine record marred by a few more bad moments than he's allowed before", but noted that "an artist like Morrison is constantly challenging his own tastes and beliefs".

Cash Box said of the single "Joyous Sound" that "Morrison relaxes with the pure sound and accent of the syllables in his vocal, while the band cooks throughout." Record World said that it's "a bright, happy jump song with a trademark Morrison horn arrangement".

In a retrospective review for AllMusic, Stephen Thomas Erlewine was more positive and said the album is "warm, welcoming, infused with spirituality and humor. Still like any period of transition, this is somewhat tentative and uneven, with its best moments, being at best, minor masterpieces." Biographer Steve Turner called the album "lethargic and uninspired" but said that perhaps it was the album Morrison needed to make after being largely absent from the music business for almost three years.

== Aftermath ==
Expectations were high and Morrison has admitted to working at his best when not under the pressure of high expectations from the industry and fans. In June 1977, he explained his feelings about this:

I think I needed to break a lot of that expectancy down. I know from experience that I go to see some artists expecting a particular thing. If they don't come up with that then I'm disappointed, but if I have no expectations they usually do something I haven't heard before and I'm turned on. The moment you expect something, you never get it.

The album charted moderately well but most critics were disappointed, after waiting three years for a new album from Morrison. He had hired Harvey Goldsmith as manager and began a much more public media profile after the album's release. He recorded a session of The Midnight Special for NBC that was broadcast in April 1977, appearing with Carlos Santana, George Benson and Etta James. Morrison also began giving interviews again, commencing with his first interview since 1973 to Cameron Crowe from Rolling Stone. In the interview when asked by Crowe: "Is the album a document of the actual period? Is the transition over?" Morrison replies: "All of that. It's been going on for about three years ... it's like, there's been lots of highs and there's been depressions ... there's been starts and stops ... it's just a period, you know."

== Album cover ==
Morrison has said that the title of the album referred to its front cover. Photographer Ken Mcgowan captured Morrison in various reflective, introspective moods until he realises with a half smile in the last shot that all such moods are transitory.

== Track listing ==
All songs written by Van Morrison unless noted.

Side one

1. "You Gotta Make It Through the World" – 5:10
2. "It Fills You Up" – 4:34
3. "The Eternal Kansas City" – 5:26

Side two

1. "Joyous Sound" – 2:48
2. "Flamingos Fly" – 4:41
3. "Heavy Connection" – 5:23
4. "Cold Wind in August" – 5:48

== Personnel ==
Musicians

- Van Morrison – acoustic and electric guitars, vocals, harmonica
- Ollie E. Brown – drums, percussion
- Marlo Henderson – guitar
- Jerry Jumonville – tenor and alto saxophones
- Reggie McBride – bass guitar
- Joel Peskin – baritone saxophone
- Mac Rebennack (Dr. John) – piano, electric piano on all tracks, guitar on "It Fills You Up"
- Mark Underwood – trumpet
- Robbie Montgomery, Roger Kennerly-Saint, Gregory Wright, Carlena Williams, Paulette Parker, Candy Nash, Toni McVey, Gary Garrett and Joe Powell – backing vocals

Production

- Producers: Van Morrison, Dr. John
- Engineer: Gary Ladinsky
- Assistant Engineers: Mike Beiriger, Richard Kaplan, Bart Johnson, Mick Glossop
- Art Direction/Design: Mike Doud-AGI Hollywood
- Photography: Ken McGowan
- Management: Harvey Goldsmith
- Cover Concept: Van Morrison

== Charts ==
Chart (1977)	Peak position
Australia (Kent Music Report)	31
American Albums Chart	43
United Kingdom (Official Charts Company)	23
