= The Eternal Kansas City =

Single by Van Morrison

from the album A Period of Transition
- A-side: "The Eternal Kansas City"
- B-side: "Joyous Sound"
- Released: 1977
- Recorded: Autumn 1976/early winter 1977
- Genre: Folk rock, R&B, gospel
- Length: 5:26
- Label: Warner Brothers
- Songwriter(s): Van Morrison
- Producer(s): Van Morrison

Van Morrison singles chronology
"Gloria" (1974)	"The Eternal Kansas City" (1977)	"Joyous Sound" (1977)

"The Eternal Kansas City" is a song by Northern Irish singer-songwriter Van Morrison. It was the key song on the 1977 album, A Period of Transition, and was his first single released since "Gloria", in 1974.

Biographer Howard DeWitt believes that the song makes the listener feel as if in a church, because of the "mystical choir", featured at the beginning of the song: "Excuse me do you know the way to Kansas City?". "Then an almost jump arrangement makes 'The Eternal Kansas City' an excellent rhythm and blues influenced song."

Johnny Rogan describes the song as "The only song on the album where there was evidence of Morrison's mysterious majesty, it blended the lily-white sound of Anita Kerr Singers with strong gospel overtones."

== Dr John on the song ==
Dr John, arranger and musician on A Period of Transition, describes the song as being:

The song that Van got the whole album hooked up around. It was a real deep thing for him to focus on. It goes from a real ethereal voice sound to a jazz introduction and then into a kind of chunky R&B.

== Personnel ==
- Van Morrison: vocal
- Ollie E. Brown: drums
- Marlo Henderson: guitar
- Jerry Jumonville: alto saxophone
- Reggie McBride: bass
- Joel Peskin: baritone saxophone
- Mac Rebennack (Dr. John): piano
- Mark Underwood: trumpet
- Carlena Williams, Paulette Parker, Candy Nash, Toni McVey: backing vocals
