= Good to Be Alive =

Good to Be Alive may refer to:

- Good to Be Alive (Long John Baldry album)
- Good 2b Alive, an album by Steelheart
- "Good to Be Alive" (DJ Rap song)
- "Good to Be Alive" (Slash's Snakepit song)
- "Good to Be Alive", a song by Meghan Trainor from The Peanuts Movie
- "Good to Be Alive", a song by Tina Charles
- "Good to Be Alive", a song by Matthew Dear from Asa Breed
- "Good to Be Alive", a song by Jason Gray from A Way to See in the Dark
- "Good to Be Alive", a song by Nitty Gritty Dirt Band from Speed of Life
- "Good to Be Alive", a song by The Pillbugs from Buzz for Aldrin
- "Good to Be Alive", a song by Pvris from Use Me
- "Good to Be Alive", a song from the musical farce Lucky Stiff
- "Good to Be Alive", a song by They Might Be Giants from Glean
- "Good to Be Alive", a song by SM Town from 2022 Winter SM Town: SMCU Palace
- "Good to Be Alive (Hallelujah)", a song by Andy Grammer
- "Good to Be Alive", a song by CG5

== See also ==
- Great to Be Alive (disambiguation)
- It's Good to Be Alive (disambiguation)
- It's Great to Be Alive (disambiguation)
