= Love, Music and Life =

Studio album by D. J. Rogers
- Released: 1977
- Recorded: 1977
- Studio: Total Experience Recording Studios, Hollywood, California
- Genre: Soul; funk
- Label: RCA
- Producer: D. J. Rogers

D. J. Rogers chronology
On the Road Again (1976)	Love, Music and Life (1977)	Love Brought Me Back (1978)

Professional ratings
Review scores
Source	Rating
AllMusic	2/5 stars

Love, Music And Life is the fourth album by D. J. Rogers, released in 1977. This was the final RCA album for Rogers.

== Track listing ==
All songs written by D. J. Rogers

1. "Love Will Make It Better" - 4:55
2. "Hold Out for Love" - 2:36
3. "Love Is On the Way" - 6:48
4. "She Has Eyes for Me" - 3:21
5. "Saved By Love" - 5:42
6. "Beauty and the Beast" - 2:57
7. "No Need to Say Goodbye" - 3:43
8. "No Price" - 6:17
9. "Love Is All I Need" - 3:15
10. "You Against You" - 5:36

== Personnel ==
- D. J. Rogers - clavinet, fender rhodes, Yamaha electric piano, Yamaha concert grand piano, lead and backing vocals
- Keni Burke - bass
- Jeff Porcaro - drums
- Jerry Peters - keyboards, piano
- Charles Bynum, Wah Wah Watson, Michael McGloiry - guitar
- Al De Ville, Henry Prejean, Nolan Smith, Reginald A. Bullen - trumpet
- Paul Anthony Russo, Robert Whitfield, Jr. - alto saxophone
- David Majal Ii - tenor saxophone
- Afreeka Trees, Alfred Taylor, Archie Sampier, Carl Madison, Carolyn Dennis, Carolyn Dennis, Cheryl Lynn, Debbie Rogers, Deborah Garrett, Deniece Williams, Eli Harrell, Eric Nero, Halbert McMullan, Howard Huntsberry, Janie Burns, Jonathan Crane, Joyce Wright, Ken Taylor, Madelyn Quebec, Robert Whitfield, Susan Grindell - backing vocals
