= Great to Be Alive =

Great to Be Alive may refer to:

- Great to Be Alive!, a theatrical musical, composed by Abraham Ellstein and Robert Russell Bennett
- "Great to Be Alive", a song by Kottonmouth Kings from Sunrise Sessions
- It's Great To Be Alive!, a 2015 live album by Drive-By Truckers

== See also ==
- It's Great to Be Alive (disambiguation)
- Good to Be Alive (disambiguation)
- "Doesn't It Feel Great to Be Alive", a song by Vinson Valega
