= Kimrie Lewis =

American actress

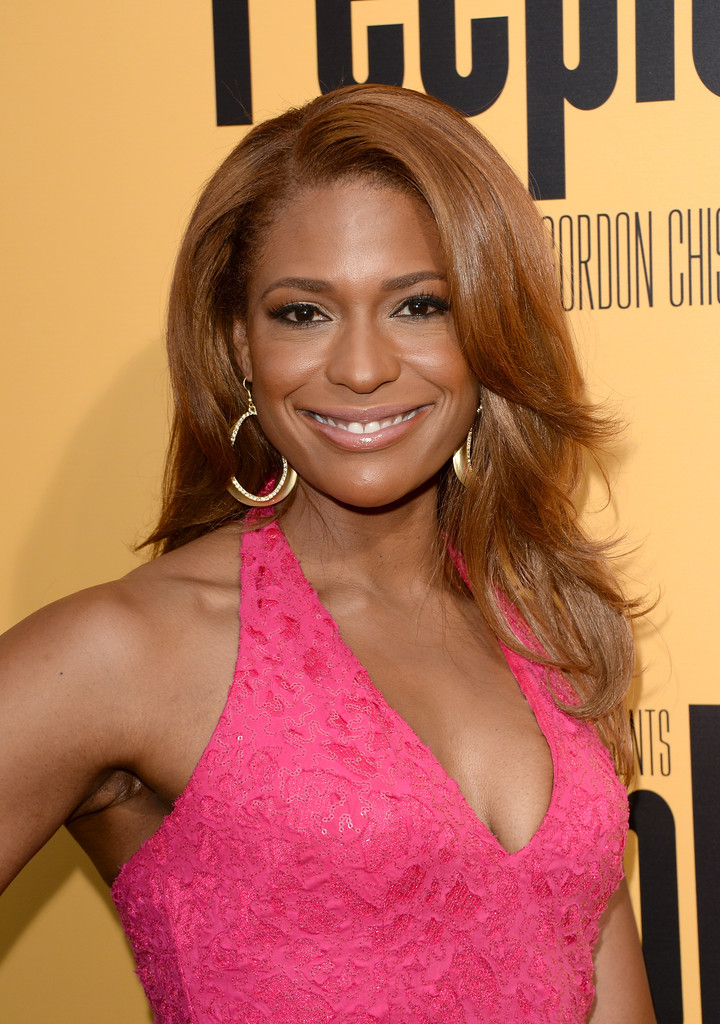
- Lewis at the Peeples premiere in 2016
- Born: Kimrie Denise Lewis; Los Angeles, California, U.S.
- Occupations: Actress; comedian
- Years active: 2006–present
- Children: 1

Kimrie Denise Lewis is an American actress, director and writer. She is best known for playing Poppy Banks on the ABC comedy Single Parents and Mika on the NBC comedy Kenan. She had a recurring role as reporter Ashley Davidson on Scandal.

== Career ==
Lewis graduated from New York University Tisch School of the Arts, with a B.A. in Theatre.

Lewis recurred as reporter Ashley on the ABC television series Scandal. She appeared as Meg in Peeples with Kerry Washington, Craig Robinson and David Alan Grier. She recurred in the ABC Family drama series Chasing Life as Madeline. She has appeared in several commercials including for McDonald's, Sherwin-Williams, and Country Music Television.

In August 2016, TV Line reported that Lewis would guest star in season 5 of the Hulu comedy The Mindy Project. Lewis began starring as a series regular on the ABC comedy Single Parents in 2018. Lewis began starring as a main character on the NBC comedy Kenan in 2021.

== Filmography ==
=== Film ===
Year	Title	Role
2013	Peeples	Meg
2018	#TwoMinutesofFame	Ebony

=== Television ===
Year	Title	Role
2006	Half & Half	Melba Barnes
2012	Go On	Terrell's Girlfriend
2013	New Girl	Keysha
2013–18	Scandal	Reporter Ashley Davidson
2014	The Neighbors	Lorraine Warner
2015	Chasing Life	Madeline
2016	The Detour	Cinnamon
2016	The Mindy Project	Patricia
2017	2 Broke Girls	Meghan
2017	The Fake News with Ted Nelms	Nora Samuels-Newman
2017	Raven's Home	LA
2018	Superstore	Jess
2018	Brockmire	Bobbi
2018–20	Single Parents	Poppy Banks
2021–22	Kenan	Mika
2022	Black-ish	Destiny
2023	Public Defenders	Bethany
