= Kenan (TV series) =

American television sitcom (2021–2022)

- Promotional Image
- Genre: Sitcom
- Created by: Jackie Clarke; David Caspe
- Starring: Kenan Thompson; Don Johnson; Chris Redd; Kimrie Lewis; Dani Lane; Dannah Lane; Taylor Louderman
- Composers: Poo Bear; Joe Wong
- Country of origin: United States
- Original language: English
- No. of seasons: 2
- No. of episodes: 20

Production
- Executive producers: Andrew Singer; Lorne Michaels; Kenan Thompson; Jackie Clarke; David Caspe; Ken Whittingham
- Producers: Trey Coscia; Keith Raskin
- Production locations: Los Angeles, California
- Camera setup: Single-camera
- Running time: 22 minutes
- Production companies: Broadway Video; Shark vs. Bear Productions; Universal Television

Original release
- Network: NBC
- Release: February 16, 2021 – January 31, 2022

Kenan is an American television sitcom created by Jackie Clarke and David Caspe. The series stars Kenan Thompson as Kenan Williams, the widowed father of Aubrey (Dani Lane) and Birdie (Dannah Lane) who hosts a morning show in Atlanta, Georgia. The show follows Williams' attempts to move on from his previous life, though he is met with much resistance from his former father-in-law Rick (Don Johnson) and brother Gary (Chris Redd). He also becomes close friends with Mika (Kimrie Lewis), his show's executive producer. The series aired on NBC from February 16, 2021, to January 31, 2022. In April 2021, the series was renewed for a second season. The second season premiered on December 15, 2021, ahead of the second season time slot premiere on January 3, 2022. In May 2022, the series was canceled after two seasons.

For his work on the show, Thompson received a nomination for the Primetime Emmy Award for Outstanding Lead Actor in a Comedy Series in 2021.

== Cast ==
=== Main ===
- Kenan Thompson as Kenan Williams
- Don Johnson as Rick Noble
- Chris Redd as Gary Williams
- Kimrie Lewis as Mika Caldwell
- Dani Lane as Aubrey Williams
- Dannah Lane as Birdie Williams
- Taylor Louderman as Tami Greenlake (season 2, recurring season 1)

=== Recurring ===
- Niccole Thurman as Cori Williams
- Jeff Lewis as Phil
- Willow Beuoy as Zoe
- Fortune Feimster as Pam Fox, sports commentator for Kenan's show
- Vanessa Bell Calloway as Bobbi, Kenan and Gary's widowed mother

=== Guest ===
- Finesse Mitchell as Kurt Franklin
- Vanessa Williams as Tasha Noble, Kenan's former mother-in-law and Rick's ex-wife

== Episodes ==
=== Series overview ===
Season	Episodes	Originally released	
Season	Episodes	First released	Last released
1	10	February 16, 2021	April 27, 2021
2	10	December 15, 2021	January 31, 2022

=== Season 1 (2021) ===
No. overall	No. in season	Title	Directed by	Written by	Original release date	U.S. viewers (millions)
1	1	"Pilot"	Ken Whittingham	Jackie Clarke & David Caspe	February 16, 2021	4.22
Kenan Williams is a retired actor and host of one of Atlanta's most popular morning shows, Wake Up With Kenan. He is also a single father raising two daughters following the death of his wife Cori, the grief from which he keeps bottled up. In an ill-advised attempt to boost the ratings for his show, he agrees to talk about his wife on-air during a guest segment; after becoming defensive, he starts tripping over his words and eventually manages to offend his entire audience by insulting stay-at-home mothers and Beyonce. Mika, his producer, forces him to apologize, but he decides to throw out the script and just confess to his viewers the truth: he never wanted to talk about his wife, but now that he has, he feels better and wants to move on. That evening, he and his family watch a blooper reel from his old show, where he first met his wife.
2	2	"Hard News"	Ken Whittingham	Matt McConkey & Rachel Pegram	February 23, 2021	2.76
To avoid having to visit one of his wife's favorite restaurants for the show, Kenan convinces Mika to run a "hard news" segment in its place. While going through Cori's closet, which has sat untouched since her death, he and Gary find a restraining order filed by a man named Ron Sherman-Willis (Vincent Rodriguez III), who Kenan believes had an affair with Cori. He takes Rick and Gary to spy on Ron, and they accidentally vandalize his yard in the process. The next day, Kenan is sent to interview Ron, and loses control of his emotions before storming off. When Mika takes him back to apologize, they learn that Ron is in fact a happily married gay man; the restraining order was issued because he outbid Cori on a car she had wanted to purchase for her husband. Satisfied with the truth, Kenan takes his family out to Cori's favorite restaurant.
3	3	"The Fourth Hour"	Ken Whittingham	Leila Strachan	March 2, 2021	2.42
Mika adds a fourth hour to Wake Up With Kenan, which requires Kenan to wake up at 4:00 am. At first, he struggles with having to alter his normal evening routine, including spending lots of time with his children, but then Mika teaches him how to "micro-nap", which seemingly solves the problem. Gary turns his attention to stopping Tami from taking advantage of his brother's difficulties to get a longer slot on the show. Rick wisely warns his son-in-law that he needs to stand up to Mika; instead, Kenan snaps during a live broadcast and starts ranting at his audience. He recognizes that his work-life balance is stretched too thin and Mika agrees to drop the fourth hour. Gary learns that he was wrong; although Tami does want more screen time, she admires Kenan too much to replace him. Kenan starts letting Rick join in on his nighttime routine.
4	4	"Flirting"	Molly McGlynn	Vanessa Ramos	March 16, 2021	2.21
After learning that Mika has had five failed engagements, Kenan is inspired to start dating again. Gary supports his decision, but Rick does not, as he cannot accept someone taking his daughter's place. Mika runs into one of her ex-boyfriends, and learns that the woman he's now dating is seemingly better than her in every way. Jealous, and annoyed by Kenan and Gary teasing her for her failed romances, Mika deliberately tricks Kenan into hitting on one of his show's guests, who happens to be the same woman. The offended guest subsequently beats Kenan up on-air during a self-defense demonstration. After watching Cori's old show, Rick finally realizes that he needs to let Kenan move on with his life. Kenan decides to take things more slowly by only doing casual dates, while also ignoring his secret feelings for Mika.
5	5	"Flipp'd"	Katie Locke O'Brien	Daniel Libman & Matthew Libman	March 23, 2021	2.22
Kenan's old bandmate from his boy-band days visits the show for a special reunion with him and Gary; their interactions cause Kenan to realize that Gary has seemingly done a poor job of managing his career, as he has no endorsement deals and no other revenue streams to support himself other than the show. The last straw is when Gary only gets Kenan $10,000 for a dog-food commercial; he is fired on the spot and Kenan hires a new manager, Various Miller, who encourages him to quit Wake Up and move to New York City when Mika refuses to renegotiate his contract. Instead, Kenan goes to see Gary at his new job, and recognizes that his decisions as a manager were all about making sure Kenan could spend as much time with his children as possible. The two reconcile, and Kenan takes Gary back as his manager.
6	6	"You Go, Squirrel!"	Ken Whittingham	Dannah Phirman & Danielle Schneider	March 30, 2021	1.96
The girls have their first sleepover, giving Kenan a much-needed night to himself after he gets Rick to take Gary out to dinner. Unfortunately, the loneliness quickly gets to him and he overdoses on hallucinogenic-infused gummies to calm down. This causes him to believe that Cori has returned in the form of a squirrel, her favorite animal. Rick and Gary become convinced that Kenan sent them away so he could be alone on his birthday and arrange a surprise party with all his friends and colleagues. Kenan informs them that his birthday is actually next week, but then realizes he doesn't really want to be alone and throws a "non-birthday" party instead. He and Mika also get a chance to discuss the root of his problems: Kenan's fear that he can never measure up to his wife's parenting skills. Mika assures him that Cori would approve of every choice he's made as a single father.
7	7	"Kenan's Mom"	Katie Locke O'Brien	Jen Chuck & Leila Strachan	April 6, 2021	2.01
Bobbi Williams, Kenan and Gary's widowed mother, comes to Atlanta to see her family; Kenan is shocked to find that the formerly overweight Bobbi has become much slimmer and healthier and is more eager to have fun and go out rather than spend time with him like she used to. Gary, on the other hand, is pleasantly surprised as he feels Bobbi always gave his brother more love and affection. Kenan becomes so desperate for attention that he fakes an injury so Bobbi has to take care of him. Rick is also disappointed to find that Bobbi has become less responsible as a parent, comparing it to when he himself was a deadbeat father. Eventually, Bobbi sits down with her son and reveals that Cori's death made her realize her own mortality and drove her to start living again. However, she now understands the importance of balancing her own needs with her role as a mother.
8	8	"Wednesday's Gal"	Ken Whittingham	Carl Tart	April 13, 2021	2.06
Kenan is dismayed to learn that Mika is throwing a "marriage" segment to raise much-needed ad revenue for the show; he feels that the bride and groom are incompatible and that the planned advertisers are a bad image for his show. In response, the advertisers pull out, and an embarrassed Kenan manages to find new ones by reaching out to the community. The bride then dumps her fiancee hours before the segment is to be filmed, and Kenan, for once, is forced to accept that he doesn't know everything about love and that if two people love each other regardless of their flaws, then they should be together. Gary confides in Rick that, at 35, he feels like an unaccomplished failure. Rick perks him up by reminding him of how much Kenan values him as a friend and manager. At the wedding party, Kenan once again finds himself being romantically attracted to Mika.
9	9	"Teacher's Strike"	Katie Locke O'Brien	Bryan Tucker	April 20, 2021	1.89
The Atlanta public teachers' union goes on strike; unable to find anywhere else to put their children, the crew of Wake Up are forced to bring them to work. This results in the show's production being severely disrupted, and Kenan in particular becomes severely irritated by his daughters constantly bothering him. Rick volunteers to host a make-up class, but quickly loses control of the kids. Kenan then tries to meditate between the union and the school board on his show, but his lack of preparation only angers the union and hardens their resolve. Finally, Kenan makes a public apology, which Mika uses to raise funds so the teachers can cut a deal with the board to end the strike. The experience brings her and Kenan closer together, and Kenan is made to realize how hard it is not to have another parent to help him manage his children.
10	10	"Hair Show"	Ken Whittingham	Yassir Lester	April 27, 2021	1.80

=== Season 2 (2021–22) ===
No. overall	No. in season	Title	Directed by	Written by	Original release date	U.S. viewers (millions)
11	1	"Christmas Show"	Charles Stone III	Daniel Chun	December 15, 2021	2.15
12	2	"Dating App"	Oz Rodriguez	Kenny Smith	January 3, 2022	2.28
13	3	"Work Friends"	Jude Weng	Bryan Tucker	January 3, 2022	1.65
14	4	"Those Chops Pop"	Molly McGlynn	Vanessa Ramos	January 10, 2022	1.92
15	5	"Ghosts of Boyfriends Past"	Matthew A. Cherry	Rickey Larke	January 10, 2022	1.46
16	6	"Hustle and Flow"	Oz Rodriguez	Lisa Muse Bryant	January 17, 2022	1.93
17	7	"Workaholic"	Richie Keen	Bill Posley	January 24, 2022	1.82
18	8	"The Whole Enchilada"	LP	Genna Ambatielos Ryan	January 24, 2022	1.29
19	9	"Moving Violation"	Kenny Smith	Teleplay by : Lisa Muse Bryant; Story by : Kenny Smith	January 31, 2022	1.98
20	10	"Destroying Miami"	LP	Glenda L. Richardson	January 31, 2022	1.49

== Production ==
=== Development ===
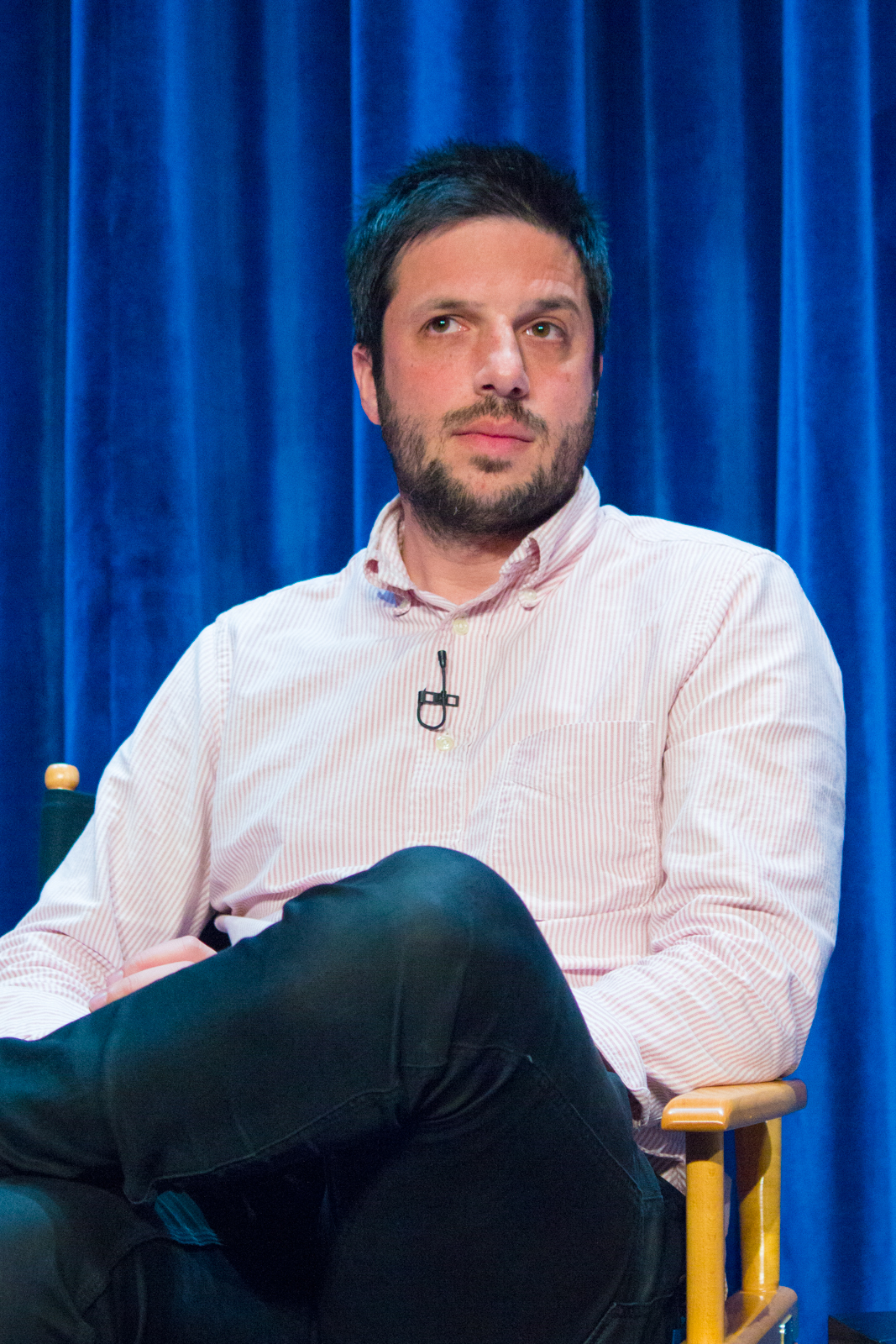
David Caspe, one of the show's creators, head writers, and executive producers

Co-creator Jackie Clarke, previously the head writer for Superstore, had written three separate versions starring Kenan Thompson. First, the show was planned to air as Saving Larry. The title (and title character's name) was later changed to Saving Kenan. The third attempt, titled The Kenan Show, was planned to air in May 2019. Chris Rock joined as the pilot's director and executive producer in January 2019. However, the pilot never aired and the project was put on hold for re-tooling. Rock dropped out of the project and the director for Kenan's pilot episode was Ken Whittingham. In July 2020, David Caspe, creator of Happy Endings and Black Monday, was brought in to develop and re-write the newest re-tooled pilot with Clarke and serve as showrunner-executive producer on the first season.

On January 26, 2021, the new title and its new cast was announced virtually at the TCA panel, as part of the 2021 Winter Press Tour for NBC. At the panel, Thompson stated "It was a long process, starting with finding someone to settle on the idea with. Jackie and I had a similar idea for what kind of show people hadn’t seen before — how to put a new twist on the ‘uplifting father figure’ kind of show."

On April 30, 2021, the series was renewed for a second season. More recently, Kenny Smith, formerly of Black-ish joined the show as co-showrunner. On May 12, 2022, the series was canceled after two seasons.

=== Casting ===
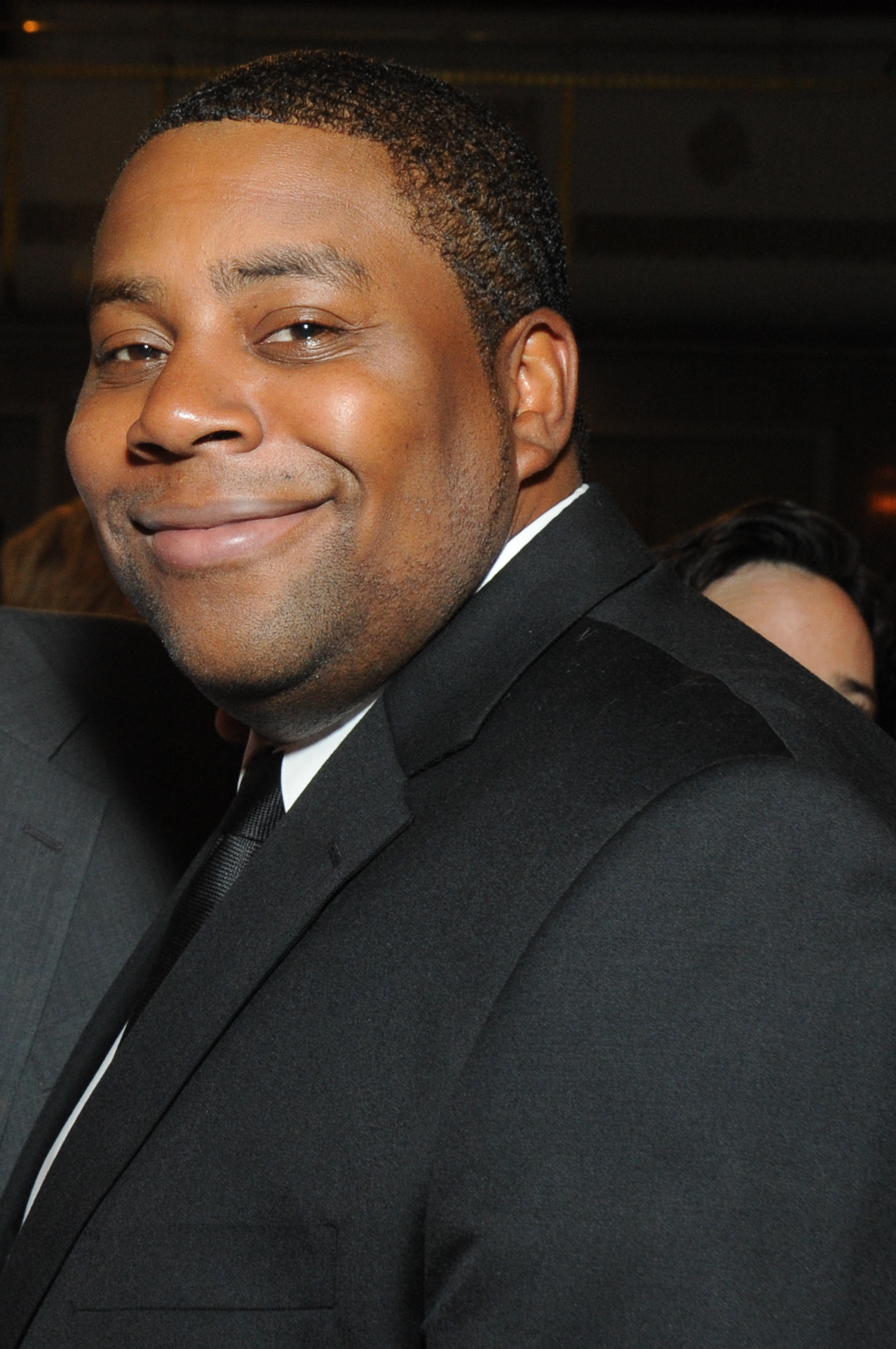
Kenan Thompson, who plays Kenan Williams

The show is led by Kenan Thompson, actor, and comedian best known for his work on Saturday Night Live. In an interview with Entertainment Weekly, Thompson said that, "It's every comedian's dream to get their own show on a major network, especially one of the original three. It's historic, mind-blowing and very surreal." Thompson originally made a deal with Universal Television in late 2018, with plans for his show to air on NBC the following year. Though he is starring in Kenan, Thompson told Variety that he has no plans to leave Saturday Night Live, as some had rumored.

Sisters Dani and Dannah Lane were cast as Aubrey and Birdie Williams after being seen in the "Call Jesus" viral music video alongside DJ Suede the Remix God, that was published March 7, 2018. Andy García was originally cast in the role of Percy, Kenan's father-in-law. However, García dropped out of the project in 2019 and the role was given to Don Johnson. The character's name was also changed to Rick. The role of Mika, Kenan's executive producer, was originally named Erica and was originally given to actress Punam Patel. However, Patel dropped out of the project with García and the role was given to Kimrie Lewis. Fellow SNL star, Chris Redd, was also cast to play Gary Williams, Kenan's brother.

== Broadcast ==
The series premiered on February 16, 2021. A holiday special episode titled as "Christmas" aired on December 15, 2021, as the season premiere, ahead of the second season moving to its time slot on January 3, 2022.

== Reception ==
=== Critical response ===
On Rotten Tomatoes, the series has an approval rating of 67% based on 12 critic reviews, with an average rating of 7.62/10. The website's critical consensus reads, "Kenan benefits from the warmth of its winsome ensemble—led by a reliably solid Kenan Thompson—but its stale sitcom trappings leave something to be desired." On Metacritic, it has a weighted average score of 63 out of 100, based on eight critic reviews, indicating "generally favorable reviews".

=== Ratings ===
==== Overall ====
Viewership and ratings per season of Kenan
Season	Timeslot (ET)	Episodes	First aired		Last aired		TV season
Season	Timeslot (ET)	Episodes	Date	Viewers (millions)	Date	Viewers (millions)	TV season
1	Tuesday 8:30 p.m.	10	February 16, 2021	4.22	April 27, 2021	1.80	2020–21
2	Wednesday 8:30 p.m. (1); Monday 8:00 p.m. (2, 4, 6, 7, 9); Monday 8:30 p.m. (3, 5, 8, 10)	10	December 15, 2021	2.15	January 31, 2022	1.49	2021–22

==== Season 1 ====
Viewership and ratings per episode of Kenan
No.	Title	Air date	Rating (18–49)	Viewers (millions)	DVR (18–49)	DVR viewers (millions)	Total (18–49)	Total viewers (millions)
1	"Pilot"	February 16, 2021	0.8	4.22	—N/a	1.09	—N/a	5.31
2	"Hard News"	February 23, 2021	0.6	2.76	—N/a	0.80	—N/a	3.57
3	"Fourth Hour"	March 2, 2021	0.5	2.42	—N/a	0.49	—N/a	2.91 (Note: Live+7 ratings were unavailable, so Live+3 ratings have been used instead.)
4	"Flirting"	March 16, 2021	0.5	2.21	—N/a	—N/a	—N/a	—N/a
5	"Flipp'd"	March 23, 2021	0.5	2.22	—N/a	—N/a	—N/a	—N/a
6	"You Go, Squirrel!"	March 30, 2021	0.4	1.96	—N/a	—N/a	—N/a	—N/a
7	"Kenan's Mom"	April 6, 2021	0.4	2.01	0.1	0.43	0.5	2.44
8	"Wednesday's Gal"	April 13, 2021	0.4	2.06	0.1	0.45	0.5	2.51
9	"Teacher's Strike"	April 20, 2021	0.4	1.89	0.1	0.39	0.5	2.29
10	"Hair Show"	April 27, 2021	0.4	1.80	0.1	0.40	0.5	2.19

==== Season 2 ====
Viewership and ratings per episode of Kenan
No.	Title	Air date	Rating (18–49)	Viewers (millions)	DVR (18–49)	DVR viewers (millions)	Total (18–49)	Total viewers (millions)
1	"Christmas Show"	December 15, 2021	0.4	2.15	0.1	0.33	0.4	2.48
2	"Dating App"	January 3, 2022	0.3	2.28	0.1	0.32	0.4	2.60
3	"Work Friends"	January 3, 2022	0.3	1.65	0.1	0.27	0.3	1.92
4	"Those Chops Pop"	January 10, 2022	0.4	1.92	—N/a	—N/a	—N/a	—N/a
5	"Ghosts of Boyfriends Past"	January 10, 2022	0.3	1.46	—N/a	—N/a	—N/a	—N/a
6	"Hustle and Flow"	January 17, 2022	0.4	1.93	0.1	0.34	0.5	2.27
7	"Workaholic"	January 24, 2022	0.3	1.82	0.1	0.26	0.4	2.08
8	"The Whole Enchilada"	January 24, 2022	0.3	1.29	0.1	0.27	0.4	1.56
9	"Moving Violation"	January 31, 2022	0.3	1.98	—N/a	—N/a	—N/a	—N/a
10	"Destroying Miami"	January 31, 2022	0.2	1.49	—N/a	—N/a	—N/a	—N/a
