= Single Parents (TV series) =

American sitcom

- Genre: Sitcom
- Created by: Elizabeth Meriwether & J. J. Philbin
- Starring: Taran Killam; Leighton Meester; Kimrie Lewis; Jake Choi; Marlow Barkley; Tyler Wladis; Devin Trey Campbell; Mia Allan; Ella Allan; Brad Garrett
- Composers: Kevin Kiner; Sean Kiner; Deana Kiner
- Country of origin: United States
- Original language: English
- No. of seasons: 2
- No. of episodes: 45

Production
- Executive producers: Elizabeth Meriwether; Katherine Pope; J. J. Philbin; Jason Winer
- Cinematography: Blake McClure; Timothy Gillis
- Editors: Matthew Freund; Pamela March; Mark Bourgeois; Stephanie Goldstein; Ray McCoy
- Camera setup: Single-camera
- Running time: 22 minutes
- Production companies: Elizabeth Meriwether Pictures; JJ Philbin Productions; ABC Studios; 20th Century Fox Television

Original release
- Network: ABC
- Release: September 26, 2018 – May 13, 2020

Single Parents is an American television sitcom that stars Taran Killam, Leighton Meester, Kimrie Lewis, Brad Garrett, and Jake Choi. It follows a group of adults who must venture through single parenthood with their young kids. The series premiered on ABC on September 26, 2018, and had a full 23-episode first season. ABC renewed the series for a second season, which premiered on September 25, 2019. In May 2020, the series was canceled after two seasons.

== Premise ==
The series begins when the group meets Will, a divorced man in his 30s who is so focused on raising his daughter that he has lost sight of who he is as a man. When the other single parents see just how invested Will has become with PTA, parenting, and princesses, they band together to get him out in the dating world and make him realize that parenthood does not mean sacrificing everything about one's own identity.

== Cast ==
Main

- Taran Killam as Will Cooper, a 30-something single father with a daughter. He is a local weatherman.
- Leighton Meester as Angie D'Amato, a single mother with a needy son and a love for punk rock music. She is a paralegal.
- Brad Garrett as Dr Douglas Fogerty, an older widowed single father with identical twin daughters who often puts them to work and an adult son.
- Kimrie Lewis as Poppy Banks, a single mother with a son. She owns the winebary - a feminist wine bar and book shop.
- Jake Choi as Miggy Park, a young single father with a baby son named Jack.
- Marlow Barkley as Sophie Cooper, Will's daughter who is very smart and sensible.
- Tyler Wladis as Graham D'Amato, Angie's needy and emotional son, who is named for the craps dealer in Las Vegas who helped Angie when she went into labor. He is known for dating most of his class. He is easily afraid.
- Devin Trey Campbell as Rory Banks, Poppy's son who has a knack for fashion and love for musical theatre.
- Mia and Ella Allan as Emma and Amy Fogerty, Douglas' genius identical twin daughters who have a superb skill for building and home renovation.

Recurring

- Adam Brody as Derek, Angie's ex-boyfriend and Graham's father, who was in a punk rock band.
- Hannah Simone (season 1) as Dr. Monica Dewan, the kids' pediatrician and Will's love interest
- Andy Favreau (season 1) as Owen, Angie's boyfriend
- Vanessa Bayer as Mia, Sophie's mom and Will's ex-wife
- Bashir Salahuddin as Ron, Rory's dad and Poppy's ex-husband
- Jama Williamson as Tracy Freeze, Will's boss and love interest
- Quinta Brunson as Bess, a regular at the winebary
- Rebecca Creskoff as Big Red, Douglas's love interest
- Jackie Seiden (season 1) as Jackie, a mom at the school
- Steve Zissis (season 1) as Mark, dad at the school who briefly dates Poppy, and is an ex-colleague of Douglas'
- Patrick Birkett as Tony, Douglas's butler
- Lamar Woods as Dwayne, Miggy's best friend
- Sarah Yarkin as Homily Pronstroller, the kid's second grade teacher, and part of Miggy's throuple
- Steve Tom as Guy McCormick, Will's weatherman co-worker who is an alcoholic
- Chloe Perrin (season 1) as Zoe/Bunny ears, a kid in the school who briefly dates Graham
- Chris Geere (season 2) as Colin, a new single parent in the school who Angie is romantically interested in

== Production ==
The series initially received a put pilot commitment from ABC in October 2017, written by Liz Meriwether and J.J. Philbin, which later evolved to a series order with Jason Winer directing the pilot. In March 2018, Taran Killam, Leighton Meester, and Brad Garrett were announced to star in the series.

The first season premiered on September 26, 2018 and a full season was ordered in October, plus an additional episode, for a total of 23 episodes. Single Parents was renewed for a second season by ABC which premiered on September 25, 2019. On May 21, 2020, ABC canceled the series after two seasons.

== Episodes ==
=== Series overview ===
Season	Episodes	Originally released	
Season	Episodes	First released	Last released
1	23	September 26, 2018	May 8, 2019
2	22	September 25, 2019	May 13, 2020

=== Season 1 (2018–19) ===
No. overall	No. in season	Title	Directed by	Written by	Original release date	Prod. code	U.S. viewers (millions)
1	1	"Pilot"	Jason Winer	Story by : Elizabeth Meriwether & JJ Philbin; Teleplay by : JJ Philbin	September 26, 2018	1LBR01	4.91
2	2	"Sleepover Ready"	Jason Winer	Sarah Tapscott	October 3, 2018	1LBR02	4.23
3	3	"A Leash Is Not A Guinea Pig"	Erin O'Malley	Kim Rosenstock	October 10, 2018	1LBR03	3.64
4	4	"Beyoncé Circa Lemonade"	Jason Winer	Alison Bennett	October 17, 2018	1LBR04	3.48
5	5	"Politician, Freemason, Scientist, Humorist and Diplomat, Ben Franklin"	Jason Winer	Blake McCormick	October 24, 2018	1LBR05	3.74
6	6	"Lettuce"	Kat Coiro	Bridger Winegar	October 31, 2018	1LBR06	3.65
7	7	"They Call Me DOCTOR Biscuits!"	Maggie Carey	Berkley Johnson	November 7, 2018	1LBR07	3.78
8	8	"The Beast"	Josh Greenbaum	Lamar Woods	November 28, 2018	1LBR08	3.35
9	9	"Ronald Reagan's White House Collectible Pen"	Trent O'Donnell	Ali Kinney	December 5, 2018	1LBR09	3.31
10	10	"The Magic Box"	Jason Winer	Joe Wengert	December 12, 2018	1LBR10	3.57
11	11	"That Elusive Zazz"	Jay Chandrasekhar	Kim Rosenstock & Sarah Tapscott	January 9, 2019	1LBR11	3.04
12	12	"All Aboard The Two-Parent Struggle Bus"	Pete Chatmon	Alison Bennett	January 16, 2019	1LBR12	2.98
13	13	"Graham D'Amato: Hot Lunch Mentalist"	Erin O'Malley	Blake McCormick	January 23, 2019	1LBR13	2.75
14	14	"The Shed"	Josh Greenbaum	Joe Wengert	January 30, 2019	1LBR14	3.28
15	15	"A Cash-Grab Cooked Up By the Crepe Paper Industry"	Kat Coiro	Bridger Winegar	February 13, 2019	1LBR15	2.60
16	16	"John Freakin' Stamos"	Anya Adams	Lamar Woods	February 20, 2019	1LBR16	2.68
17	17	"Summer of Miggy"	Trent O'Donnell	Adam Peña	February 27, 2019	1LBR17	2.85
18	18	"A Radiant Cloak of Sexual Irresistibility"	Erin O'Malley	Ali Kinney	March 13, 2019	1LBR20	3.32
19	19	"Win a Lunch with KZOP's Will Cooper!"	Kat Coiro	Berkley Johnson	March 20, 2019	1LBR18	3.05
20	20	"Raining Blood"	Josh Greenbaum	Noah Garfinkel	April 3, 2019	1LBR19	3.08
21	21	"JOUST!"	Natalia Anderson	Celeste Klaus & Dani Shank	April 10, 2019	1LBR21	3.16
22	22	"Lance Bass Space Cump"	Erin O'Malley	David Feeney	May 1, 2019	1LBR22	2.88
23	23	"Ketchup"	Erin O'Malley	JJ Philbin	May 8, 2019	1LBR23	2.63

=== Season 2 (2019–20) ===
No. overall	No. in season	Title	Directed by	Written by	Original release date	Prod. code	U.S. viewers (millions)
24	1	"Summer of Freedom"	Erin O'Malley	Alison Bennett	September 25, 2019	2LBR01	2.82
25	2	"Graham Fought the Bones and the Bones Won"	Fred Savage	Berkley Johnson	October 2, 2019	2LBR02	2.86
26	3	"Derek Sucks"	Natalia Anderson	Kim Rosenstock	October 9, 2019	2LBR03	2.68
27	4	"Big Widow Wives"	Erin O'Malley	Taylor Cox	October 16, 2019	2LBR04	2.77
28	5	"Sport"	Erin O'Malley	Ali Kinney	October 23, 2019	2LBR05	2.46
29	6	"Welcome to Hell, Sickos!"	Jennifer Arnold	Noah Garfinkel	October 30, 2019	2LBR06	2.66
30	7	"Xander and Camille"	Trent O'Donnell	Matt Fusfeld & Alex Cuthbertson	November 6, 2019	2LBR07	2.60
31	8	"Every Thursday Should Be Like This"	Satya Bhabha	Mnelik Belilgne	November 20, 2019	2LBR08	2.57
32	9	"A Place Where Men Can Be Men"	Dean Holland	Kyle Mack	December 4, 2019	2LBR09	2.54
33	10	"Good Holidays to You"	Bill Purple	Alison Bennett	December 11, 2019	2LBR10	3.01
34	11	"The Angie-Man"	Jillian Giacomini	Berkley Johnson & Maurin Mwombela	January 8, 2020	2LBR11	3.33
35	12	"Welcome to Hilltop!"	Daryl Wein	Dani Shank	January 15, 2020	2LBR12	2.44
36	13	"Chunkies"	Ken Whittingham	Taylor Cox	January 22, 2020	2LBR13	2.41
37	14	"Yarn and Pebbles"	Michael Schur	Noah Garfinkel	January 29, 2020	2LBR14	2.38
38	15	"Chez Second Grade"	Jeffrey Blitz	Kyle Mack	February 12, 2020	2LBR15	2.44
39	16	"Hip$ for Dolores"	Natalia Anderson	Mnelik Belilgne	February 19, 2020	2LBR16	2.19
40	17	"Untz, Untz, Untz"	Erin O'Malley	Ali Kinney	February 26, 2020	2LBR17	2.26
41	18	"Oh Dip, She's Having a Baby"	Jason Winer	Kim Rosenstock	April 15, 2020	2LBR18	2.48
42	19	"A Night in Camarillo"	Anya Adams	Celeste Klaus	April 22, 2020	2LBR19	2.37
43	20	"Look, This is Obviously a Sexy Situation"	Matt Freund	Matt Fusfeld & Alex Cuthbertson	May 6, 2020	2LBR20	2.79
44	21	"A Night of Delicate Frenching"	Fred Savage	David Feeney	May 6, 2020	2LBR21	2.22
45	22	"No. Wait. What? Hold On."	Erin O'Malley	JJ Philbin	May 13, 2020	2LBR22	2.26

== Reception ==
=== Critical response ===
On review aggregation Rotten Tomatoes, the series holds an approval rating of 75% with an average rating of 7.14/10, based on 16 reviews. The site's critic consensus states: "While the jokes can be a little juvenile, Single Parents earns brownie points for a likable cast and a funny focus on parental struggles." Metacritic, which uses a weighted average, assigned the series a score of 67 out of 100 based on 10 critics, indicating "generally favorable reviews". Giving the show a B+, TVLine called it "hands down the fall's funniest new sitcom." Caroline Framke with Variety says "even when Single Parents stumbles, it's refreshing to see a comedy that acknowledges a different experience than most hangout sitcoms do," and that "hopefully, with a strong cast and writing team behind it, Single Parents can tap into [plenty of material there] and find a specific groove all its own."

In a TV Guide review, Malcolm Venable said the show "has an insightful goofiness about it that's absolutely endearing, and will likely be a balm for exhausted single parents keen to see a show that knows their struggle is real," but added, "It needs just a little more finesse to find its true north in terms of tone, and how to best employ the marquee talents Meester and Garrett, who sometimes feel underused as Killam's adorkable dad thing hogs most of the spotlight." He also noted that "what really makes Single Parents sparkle are the kids who are "legit funny, deft actors who steal pretty much every scene they're in." The Hollywood Reporter said "Single Parents feels like a comedy that goes for simple snark and believes it's a little more clever than it really is, but then had a bunch of network notes stuck to it about softening those right angles," with "a kind of paint-by-numbers approach." Along the same lines, the Los Angeles Times said the show "takes its cues from the network's other family comedies, such as black-ish, but the jokes are too sophomoric to come close to the brilliance and humor of that award-winning show or the Emmy-amassing Modern Family."

=== Ratings ===
Viewership and ratings per season of Single Parents
Season	Timeslot (ET)	Episodes	First aired		Last aired		TV season	Viewership rank	Avg. viewers (millions)	Avg. 18–49 rating
Season	Timeslot (ET)	Episodes	Date	Viewers (millions)	Date	Viewers (millions)	TV season	Viewership rank	Avg. viewers (millions)	Avg. 18–49 rating
1	Wednesday 9:30 p.m.	23	September 26, 2018	4.91	May 8, 2019	2.63	2018–19	116	4.03	1.2
2	Wednesday 9:30 p.m.	22	September 25, 2019	2.82	May 13, 2020	2.26	2019–20	91	3.63	1.0

==== Season 1 ====
Viewership and ratings per episode of Single Parents
No.	Title	Air date	Rating/share (18–49)	Viewers (millions)	DVR (18–49)	DVR viewers (millions)	Total (18–49)	Total viewers (millions)
1	"Pilot"	September 26, 2018	1.3/6	4.91	0.9	2.52	2.2	7.43
2	"Sleepover Ready"	October 3, 2018	1.1/5	4.23	0.7	1.75	1.8	5.98
3	"A Leash Is Not A Guinea Pig"	October 10, 2018	1.0/4	3.64	0.6	1.63	1.6	5.28
4	"Beyoncé Circa Lemonade"	October 17, 2018	0.9/4	3.48	0.6	1.39	1.5	4.87
5	"Politician, Freemason, Scientist, Humorist and Diplomat, Ben Franklin"	October 24, 2018	1.0/5	3.74	0.6	1.42	1.6	5.16
6	"Lettuce"	October 31, 2018	0.9/4	3.65	0.6	1.48	1.5	5.13
7	"They Call Me DOCTOR Biscuits!"	November 7, 2018	1.0/5	3.78	0.6	1.42	1.6	5.20
8	"The Beast"	November 28, 2018	0.9/4	3.35	0.5	1.47	1.4	4.82
9	"Ronald Reagan's White House Collectible Pen"	December 5, 2018	0.8/3	3.31	0.5	—N/a	1.3	—N/a
10	"The Magic Box"	December 12, 2018	0.9/4	3.57	0.6	1.39	1.5	4.96
11	"That Elusive Zazz"	January 9, 2019	0.8/3	3.04	0.5	1.41	1.3	4.45
12	"All Aboard The Two-Parent Struggle Bus"	January 16, 2019	0.8/4	2.98	0.5	1.31	1.3	4.29
13	"Graham D'Amato: Hot Lunch Mentalist"	January 23, 2019	0.7/3	2.75	0.5	1.39	1.2	4.14
14	"The Shed"	January 30, 2019	0.8/4	3.28	0.5	1.25	1.3	4.53
15	"A Cash-Grab Cooked Up By the Crepe Paper Industry"	February 13, 2019	0.6/3	2.60	0.4	1.16	1.0	3.76
16	"John Freakin' Stamos"	February 20, 2019	0.7/3	2.68	0.5	1.21	1.2	3.89
17	"Summer of Miggy"	February 27, 2019	0.7/3	2.85	0.5	1.18	1.2	4.03
18	"A Radiant Cloak of Sexual Irresistibility"	March 13, 2019	0.8/4	3.32	0.5	1.20	1.3	4.52
19	"Win a Lunch with KZOP's Will Cooper!"	March 20, 2019	0.7/4	3.05	0.5	1.15	1.2	4.20
20	"Raining Blood"	April 3, 2019	0.7/3	3.08	0.5	1.14	1.2	4.22
21	"Joust!"	April 10, 2019	0.8/4	3.16	0.4	1.14	1.2	4.30
22	"Lance Bass Space Camp"	May 1, 2019	0.7/3	2.88	0.4	—N/a	1.1	—N/a
23	"Ketchup"	May 8, 2019	0.7/3	2.63	0.4	1.11	1.1	3.74

==== Season 2 ====
Viewership and ratings per episode of Single Parents
No.	Title	Air date	Rating/share (18–49)	Viewers (millions)	DVR (18–49)	DVR viewers (millions)	Total (18–49)	Total viewers (millions)
1	"Summer of Freedom"	September 25, 2019	0.7/4	2.82	0.5	1.26	1.2	4.08
2	"Graham Fought the Bones and the Bones Won"	October 2, 2019	0.7/4	2.86	0.5	1.06	1.2	3.92
3	"Derek Sucks"	October 9, 2019	0.7/4	2.68	0.4	1.05	1.1	3.73
4	"Big Widow Wives"	October 16, 2019	0.7/4	2.77	0.4	1.02	1.1	3.79
5	"Sport"	October 23, 2019	0.6/3	2.46	0.3	0.92	0.9	3.38
6	"Welcome to Hell, Sickos!"	October 30, 2019	0.6/3	2.66	0.5	1.04	1.1	3.71
7	"Xander and Camille"	November 6, 2019	0.6/3	2.60	0.5	1.08	1.1	3.68
8	"Every Thursday Should Be Like This"	November 20, 2019	0.6/3	2.57	0.4	TBD	1.0	—N/a
9	"A Place Where Men Can Be Men"	December 4, 2019	0.6/3	2.54	0.4	1.17	1.0	3.71
10	"Good Holidays to You"	December 11, 2019	0.6/4	3.01	0.4	1.02	1.0	4.03
11	"The Angie-Man"	January 8, 2020	0.9/5	3.33	0.4	1.19	1.3	4.52
12	"Welcome to Hilltop!"	January 15, 2020	0.6/3	2.44	0.4	1.12	1.0	3.56
13	"Chunkies"	January 22, 2020	0.6/3	2.41	0.4	1.06	0.9	3.47
14	"Yarn and Pebbles"	January 29, 2020	0.5/3	2.38	0.4	1.00	0.9	3.39
15	"Chez Second Grade"	February 12, 2020	0.6	2.44	0.4	—N/a	1.0	—N/a
16	"Hip$ for Dolores"	February 19, 2020	0.6	2.19	0.4	—N/a	1.0	—N/a
17	"Untz, Untz, Untz"	February 26, 2020	0.5	2.26	0.4	0.98	0.9	3.24
18	"Oh Dip, She's Having a Baby"	April 15, 2020	0.5	2.48	0.4	1.09	0.9	3.57
19	"A Night in Camarillo"	April 22, 2020	0.5	2.37	0.3	1.05	0.8	3.42
20	"Look, This is Obviously a Sexy Situation"	May 6, 2020	0.6	2.79	0.3	0.90	0.9	3.69
21	"A Night of Delicate Frenching"	May 6, 2020	0.4	2.22	0.4	0.90	0.8	3.13
22	"No. Wait. What? Hold On."	May 13, 2020	0.5	2.26	0.4	1.02	0.9	3.27
