= Don't Say You Love Me =

Don't Say You Love Me may refer to:

- "Don't Say You Love Me" (Billy Squier song), 1989
- "Don't Say You Love Me" (Erasure song), 2005
- "Don't Say You Love Me" (Fifth Harmony song), 2018
- "Don't Say You Love Me" (Jin song), 2025
- "Don't Say You Love Me" (M2M song), 1999
- "Don't Say You Love Me", a 1997 song by the Corrs from Talk on Corners
- "Don't Say You Love Me", a 1970 song by Free from Fire and Water

== See also ==
- "Don't Tell Me You Love Me"
