= It's Great to Be Alive =

It's Great to Be Alive may refer to:

- It's Great to Be Alive (film), a 1933 sci-fi comedy film
- It's Great To Be Alive!, a 2015 live album by Drive-By Truckers
- It's Great to Be Alive (album), an album by Fake Problems
- "It's Great to Be Alive" (song), a song written by Johnny Mercer and recorded by Jo Stafford and then Johnny Mercer in My Huckleberry Friend
- It Is Great to Be Alive, a book by Harry Hooton

== See also ==
- "It's great to be alive in Colma", a humorous motto for Colma, California, now recorded in the city's website
- "It's Great to be Alive! It's great to be a Conk!", the motto for Kentwood High School (Washington)
- Yaşamak Güzel Şey be Kardeşim, or It's Great to Be Alive, Brother, a novel by Nâzım Hikmet
- "It's a Great Day to Be Alive", a song by Jon Randall, later recorded by Travis Tritt
- Great to Be Alive (disambiguation)
- It's Good to Be Alive (disambiguation)
