= D. J. Rogers =

American singer (1948–2020)

- Born: DeWayne Julius Rogers; May 9, 1948; Los Angeles, California, U.S.
- Origin: Los Angeles, California, U.S.
- Died: August 22, 2020 (aged 72)
- Genres: R&B; gospel; dance; soul; disco; funk
- Occupations: Singer; songwriter
- Instruments: Vocals; keyboards
- Years active: 1973–2012
- Labels: Shelter; RCA; Columbia; ARC

DeWayne Julius Rogers (May 9, 1948 – August 22, 2020) was an American singer, songwriter, record producer, and multi-instrumentalist.

== Biography ==
A native of Los Angeles, Rogers was eldest of five children born to Eula Bonds and the Rev. Julius Cesar Rogers. He began singing at age three and later played keyboards and sang with his father's House of Refuge Church of God in Christ.

He was best known for the tender acoustic piano-based ballad "Say You Love Me", a charting single from his 1975 RCA album It's Good to Be Alive. Natalie Cole's cover of the song was the first single from her album Snowfall on the Sahara, released by WEA and Elektra Entertainment in June 1999.

He died in 2020 at the age of 72.

== Discography ==
=== Studio albums ===
Year	Album	Chart positions		Record label
Year	Album	US	US R&B	Record label
1973	D. J. Rogers	—	—	Shelter Records
1975	It's Good to Be Alive	—	36	RCA Records
1976	On the Road Again	175	49	RCA Records
1977	Love, Music and Life	—	—	RCA Records
1978	Love Brought Me Back	—	54	Columbia Records
1979	Trust Me	—	—	ARC Records
1980	The Message Is Still The Same	—	—	ARC Records
1982	Hope Songs Vol. I	—	—	Hope Song Records

=== Singles ===
Year	Single	Chart positions	
Year	Single	US	US R&B
1976	"Let My Life Shine"	—	78
1976	"Say You Love Me"	98	51
1978	"All My Love"	—	87
1978	"Love Brought Me Back"	—	20
1980	"Givin' It Up Is Givin' Up"	—	47
1980	"Love Cycles"	—	44
1980	"She Believes in Me"	—	66
