= It's Good to Be Alive (album) =

Studio album by D. J. Rogers
- Released: 1975
- Recorded: 1975
- Genre: Soul; funk
- Length: 38:59
- Label: RCA
- Producer: D. J. Rogers

D. J. Rogers chronology
D. J. Rogers (1973)	It's Good to Be Alive (1975)	On the Road Again (1976)

Professional ratings
Review scores
Source	Rating
Allmusic	3/5 stars

It's Good to Be Alive is the second album by American singer and songwriter D. J. Rogers, released in 1975. Produced and written by D. J. Rogers, this was his debut album for RCA. The song "Say You Love Me" became a minor hit on both the R&B and pop charts, and arguably Rogers' signature song.

== Track listing ==
All tracks composed and arranged by D. J. Rogers

1. "Hold On, Be Strong" – 3:28
2. "It's Good to Be Alive" – 3:22
3. "Faithful to the End" – 3:53
4. "Love Will See You Through" – 3:24
5. "Say You Love Me" – 5:41
6. "(It's Alright Now) Think I'll Make It Anyhow" – 2:56
7. "If You Didn't Love Me (Don't Go Away)" – 4:00
8. "Living Is All That Matters" – 3:18
9. "Love You Forever" – 3:30
10. "Bula Jean" – 5:27

== Personnel ==
- D. J. Rogers – lead vocals, Wurlitzer electric piano, concert grand piano, Cordovox piano, Clavinet, mixing
- Keith Hatchell – bass guitar
- Hank McGill – recording, mixing
- Michael McGloiry – guitar
- Paul Smith – organ, Wurlitzer electric piano
- [Uncredited musician] – drums

== Charts ==
Chart performance for It's Good to Be Alive
Chart (1976)	Peak
US Top Soul Albums	36

=== Singles ===
Year	Single	Chart positions	
Year	Single	US Pop	US R&B
1976	"Say You Love Me"	98	51
