= Lalomie Washburn =

American singer and songwriter (1941–2004)

- Also known as: Lomie
- Born: August 25, 1941; Memphis, Tennessee, United States
- Died: December 18, 2004 (aged 63) Los Angeles, California, United States
- Genres: R&B
- Occupations: Singer, songwriter
- Label: Parachute

Lalomie (Lomie) Washburn (25 August 1941 – 18 December 2004) was an American R&B singer and songwriter.

She was born on August 25, 1941, in Memphis, Tennessee, and went on to sing backup with such legends as Ray Charles, Ike & Tina Turner and Chaka Khan. She wrote songs for and with Rufus & Chaka Khan, New Birth, Buddy Miles, The Brothers Johnson and Aretha Franklin.

== Career ==
Washburn was the key figure in the band High Voltage, which also included members; singer-guitarist Tony Maiden, bassist Bobby Watson, and singer-songwriter Gavin Christopher. The group signed to Columbia and merged with a significant amount of members of the group Maxayn. High Voltage released their self-titled album in 1972. It was one of the Special Merit Picks in the 26 August issue of Billboard where it was given a very good review.

The single "Country Road" had a positive review in the 7 October issue of Record World. The reviewer wrote that the title gave no hint of the hard rocking horn sound in the grooves, but the advice was to "Get down and get with it". It was also a single with potential as shown in the 25 November issue of Billboard. It was a Soul Sauce Best New Single of the Week. It was also one of the Radio Action and Pick Singles in the Pop section. The reviewer referred to it as a driving rocker loaded with pop and soul chart potential.

In 1977, Washburn signed with the Parachute label, She worked with producer and engineer, Sye Mitchell, where she released her first album, My Music is Hot. She went on to launch a solo career, which drew a large following in Germany in the 1970s and 1980s. In 1992, she released several 12" singles, and in 1997 a second (self-titled) solo album. She came back to Omaha, Nebraska, to do a small tour when in her mid-fifties.

She died on September 18, 2004, in Los Angeles, California.

In 2005, she was inducted into the Omaha Black Music Hall of Fame.
