= Maxayn =

American soul group

- Origin: Los Angeles, California United States
- Genres: R&B, soul, funk, pop
- Years active: 1972–1974
- Label: Capricorn Records
- Members: Maxayn Lewis; Andre Lewis (deceased January 2012); Marlo Henderson; Hank Redd; Emry Thomas

Maxayn was an American soul group of the 1970s. It consisted of the lead singer Maxayn Lewis, Andre Lewis, Emry Thomas, Marlo Henderson and Hank Redd. The group had a hit with "Check Out Your Mind". Maxayn released three albums on Capricorn Records between 1972 and 1974, which were distributed by Warner Bros Records.

== History ==
The band took its name from the lead singer Maxayn Lewis (born Paulette Parker), former Ikette and wife of band keyboardist Andre Lewis. The band also included Marlo Henderson (guitar) and Emry Thomas (drums). Andre and Henderson had previously played on the 1970 Buddy Miles Express albums A Message To The People and Them Changes.

By March, 1973, the group's second album, Mindful was released on Capricorn Records. It had been getting some airplay on WKWC-FM in North Carolina. The album would be bubbling under the Billboard 200. However, it earned a top 50 placement on the Soul Albums survey (Best Selling Soul LPs), peaking at no. 43 on the week ending June 16.

On the week ending June 2, 1973, their single "Check Out Your Mind" made its debut at no. 39 on the Billboard Best Selling Soul Singles chart. It peaked at no. 35 on week two and spent a total of three weeks in the chart.

They signed to Manticore Records in 1975. A new single titled "Spirit Groove" was expected from their fourth album, but contractual issues derailed the project.

In 1975, Maxayn signed to Motown but disbanded shortly after. Andre Lewis went on to record disco funk albums under the name Mandré.

In 2017, Cherry Red Records released the compilation album Reloaded: The Complete Recordings 1972-1974.

== Discography (US) ==
Singles
| Title | Release info | Year | Notes |
|---|---|---|---|
| "Gimme Shelter" / "Song" | Capricorn CPR 0009 | 1972 | |
| "Let Me Be Your Friend" / "Trying For Days" | Capricorn CPR 0011 | 1972 | |
| "Check Out Your Mind" / "Good Things" | Capricorn CPR 0017 | 1973 | US R&B #35 |
| " Feelin'" / "Travellin'" | Capricorn CPR 0026 | 1973 | |
| "Bail Out" / "Everything Begins With You" | Capricorn CPR 0041 | 1974 | |
| "You Don't Have To Be Lonely" / "Moonfunk" | Capricorn CPR 0077 | 1974 | |

Vinyl albums
| Title | Release info | Year | Notes |
|---|---|---|---|
| Maxayn | Capricorn CP 0103 | 1972 | Billboard review (June 10, 1972) |
| Mindful | Capricorn CP 0110 | 1973 | US R&B #43 |
| Bail Out For Fun! | Capricorn CP 0125 | 1974 | |
