= Marlo Henderson =

- Born: Leroy Marlo Henderson (originally Leroy Mario Henderson); 1948; New Mexico
- Died: October 25, 2015 (aged 66–67)
- Occupation: Session musician
- Instruments: guitar, saxophone
- Years active: 1964 – 2015
- Labels: Motown, Capitol

Marlo Henderson was an American guitarist and saxophonist, who played in mainly blues and R&B genres. As a session musician he played on albums such as Off the Wall by Michael Jackson, Them Changes by Buddy Miles, Face to Face by Evelyn "Champagne" King, I Am by Earth, Wind & Fire. He also played on the "Girlfriend" song by Paul McCartney.

As a songwriter he co-wrote "Young, Willing and Able" with Minnie Riperton which appears on her 1977 album Stay In Love. He also co-wrote "Strange Affair" with Riperton which appears on her album Love Lives Forever (1980). Other compositions include "In The Morning" which appears on Táta Vega's Try My Love album and "Power in Your Love" with Booker T. Jones and Michael Stokes.

He was also a producer.

== Background ==
=== Personal life ===
Henderson was born in Alamogordo, New Mexico in 1948. He was supposed to be named Leroy Mario Henderson. A mistake on the birth certificate was made and the Mario part of his name became Marlo. He changed the more common spelling of Leroy to Leroi.

In the early 1970s he played on the We Got To Live Together Album by Buddy Miles. One of the tracks he also contributed backing vocals to was "Walking Down The Highway".

=== Professional ===
In addition to being a session musician, he was also an arranger and producer whose work appeared on over 50 albums. During the 1970s he was a member of Stevie Wonder's back-up band Wonderlove. Also during the 1970s he was a member of the funk group Maxayn.

In the mid-1970s, Marlo Henderson was featured in advertisements for the Ibanez 2670 Artwood Twin guitar.

== Career ==
=== Buddy Miles period ===
Henderson played on the Them Changes album that was released in 1970, and the We Got to Live Together album that followed.

Henderson went to Finland with Buddy Miles and they performed live. He played rhythm guitar. The other musicians in the rhythm section were, Buddy Miles on lead vocals, Charlie Karp on lead guitar, David Hull on bass, and Fred Allen on drums when Miles was up front singing. The concert that was filmed shows Henderson providing occasional backing vocals.

=== Further activities ===
Following his time in Buddy Miles' band, Henderson along with Andre Lewis became part of the group Maxayn who were signed to Capricorn Records in 1972, and expecting their debut album to he released in April that year. Henderson also played on the High Voltage self-titled album that was released in 1972.

In the late 1990s he was involved in the production of Roscoe Lee Browne's Murmurs of the Heart album.

On 20 November 2004, Henderson was at the La Jolla Hard Rock cafe, jamming on stage with Leon Hendrix, Riki Hendrix and Buddy Miles.

=== Death ===
He died at age 67 on 25 October 2015. Prior to his death he had been suffering from cancer.
