= Jimi Hendrix posthumous discography =

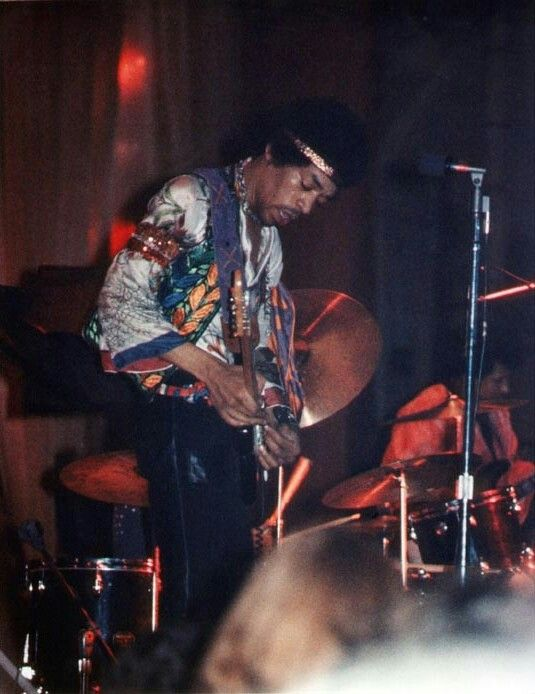
- Studio albums: 13
- Soundtrack albums: 2
- Live albums: 28
- Singles: 28
- Anthologies and retrospective albums: 20
- EPs and special releases: 27
- Official bootlegs: 23

Jimi Hendrix (1942–1970) was an American guitarist whose career spanned the years between 1962 and 1970. His posthumous discography includes recordings released after September 18, 1970. Hendrix left behind many recordings in varying stages of completion. This material, along with reissues of his career catalogue, has been released over the years in several formats by various producers and record companies. Since Experience Hendrix, a company owned and operated by members of the Hendrix family, took control of his recording legacy in 1995, over 15 Hendrix albums have appeared on the main US albums chart. Several of these have also placed on charts in more than 18 countries around the world.

At the time of his death, Hendrix was recording songs for a fourth studio album. He was working on enough material for a double album and had sketched out possible track lists. However, only about six songs were nearing completion, with an additional twenty or so in different stages of development. The first attempt at presenting Hendrix's fourth studio album, a single LP record titled The Cry of Love, was released in 1971 and reached number three on Billboard's album chart. A second attempt titled Voodoo Soup, with some different songs and a new audio mix, was released in 1995 and appeared at number 66. In 1997, Experience Hendrix restored the original mixes and added several songs for a third release: the double-album length First Rays of the New Rising Sun, the first to use one of Hendrix's proposed titles, reached number 49.

In addition to songs planned for a fourth studio album, numerous demos, studio outtakes/alternate takes, and jams have been released. Albums of concert performances and compilations focusing on various aspects of Hendrix's work have been issued. From 1970 to 1992, his record companies Reprise Records in the US and Track Records/Polydor Records in the UK continued to handle his recordings. MCA Records took over in 1992, during the controversial tenure of subsequent producer Alan Douglas. Since 2010, Sony/Legacy Recordings has been distributing the releases produced by Experience Hendrix. Besides legitimate releases, many bootleg and grey market albums have appeared over the years. Many of these have been reissued several times with different album titles, packaging, and song titles. Some purporting to feature Hendrix as a sideman have been shown to be fake. To meet the demand, Dagger Records was established in 1998 to issue "official bootlegs" of albums "that don't meet the technical recording criteria" and standards for mainstream release. These have included live recordings from various points in his career as well as demo and rehearsal recordings.

== Studio recordings ==
| Year | Album details | | Peak chart positions | | | Certifications (sales thresholds) |
| Year | Album details | | US | UK | Other | Certifications (sales thresholds) |
| Year | US release | UK release | US | UK | Other | Certifications (sales thresholds) |
|---|---|---|---|---|---|---|
| 1971 | The Cry of Love | | 3 | 2 | (Note: The Cry of Love: US R&B No. 6, Belgium (Nl) No. 146, Belgium (Fr) No. 191, Canada No. 3, Germany No. 15, Netherlands No. 3, Norway No. 7) | RIAA: Platinum |
| 1971 | Released: March 5, 1971; Label: Reprise (MS 2034); Format: LP record | Released: March 5, 1971; Label: Track (2408 101); Format: LP | 3 | 2 | (Note: The Cry of Love: US R&B No. 6, Belgium (Nl) No. 146, Belgium (Fr) No. 191, Canada No. 3, Germany No. 15, Netherlands No. 3, Norway No. 7) | RIAA: Platinum |
| 1971 | Rainbow Bridge | | 15 | 16 | (Note: Rainbow Bridge: US R&B No. 9, Canada No. 6, Germany No. 34, Norway No. 16) | RIAA: Gold |
| 1971 | Released: October 1971; Label: Reprise (MS 2040); Format: LP | Released: November 1971; Label: Reprise (K44159); Format: LP | 15 | 16 | (Note: Rainbow Bridge: US R&B No. 9, Canada No. 6, Germany No. 34, Norway No. 16) | RIAA: Gold |
| 1972 | War Heroes | | 48 | 23 | (Note: War Heroes: Canada No. 51) | |
| 1972 | Released: December 1972; Label: Reprise (MS 2103); Format: LP | Released: October 1, 1972; Label: Polydor (2302 020); Format: LP | 48 | 23 | (Note: War Heroes: Canada No. 51) | |
| 1974 | Loose Ends | | — | — | — | |
| 1974 | Not released | Released: February 1974; Label: Polydor (2310 301); Format: LP | — | — | — | |
| 1975 | Crash Landing | | 5 | 35 | (Note: Crash Landing: Canada No. 5) | RIAA: Gold |
| 1975 | Released: March 1975; Label: Reprise (MS 2204); Format: LP | Released: August 1975; Label: Polydor (2310 398); Format: LP | 5 | 35 | (Note: Crash Landing: Canada No. 5) | RIAA: Gold |
| 1975 | Midnight Lightning | | 43 | 46 | — | |
| 1975 | Released: November 1975; Label: Reprise (MS 2229); Format: LP | Released: November 1975; Label: Polydor (2310 415); Format: LP | 43 | 46 | — | |
| 1980 | Nine to the Universe | | 127 | — | — | |
| 1980 | Released: March 1980; Label: Reprise (HS 2299); Format: LP | Released: June 1980; Label: Polydor (2344 155); Format: LP | 127 | — | — | |
| 1995 | Voodoo Soup | | 66 | 83 | — | |
| 1995 | Released: April 1, 1995; Label: MCA (MCAD-11236); Format: CD | Released May 1995; Label: MCA; Format: CD, cassette | 66 | 83 | — | |
| 1997 | First Rays of the New Rising Sun | | 49 | 37 | (Note: First Rays of the New Rising Sun: Germany No. 90, New Zealand No. 27, Sweden No. 46) | |
| 1997 | Released: April 22, 1997; Label: MCA (11599); Formats: CD, LP | Released: April 22, 1997; Label: MCA; Formats: CD, LP | 49 | 37 | (Note: First Rays of the New Rising Sun: Germany No. 90, New Zealand No. 27, Sweden No. 46) | |
| 1997 | South Saturn Delta | | 51 | — | (Note: South Saturn Delta: Canada No. 92) | |
| 1997 | Released: October 7, 1997; Label: MCA (11684); Formats: CD, LP | Released: October 7, 1997; Label: MCA; Formats: CD, LP | 51 | — | (Note: South Saturn Delta: Canada No. 92) | |
| 2010 | Valleys of Neptune | | 4 | 21 | (Note: Valleys of Neptune: Australia No. 8, Austria No. 6, Belgium (Nl) No. 6, Belgium (Fr) No. 13, Germany No. 34, Netherlands No. 4, New Zealand No. 3, Norway No. 17, Sweden No. 7, Switzerland No. 8) | |
| 2010 | Released: March 9, 2010; Label: Legacy (88697 64056 2); Formats: CD, double LP | Released: March 8, 2010; Label: Sony; Format: CD | 4 | 21 | (Note: Valleys of Neptune: Australia No. 8, Austria No. 6, Belgium (Nl) No. 6, Belgium (Fr) No. 13, Germany No. 34, Netherlands No. 4, New Zealand No. 3, Norway No. 17, Sweden No. 7, Switzerland No. 8) | |
| 2013 | People, Hell and Angels | | 2 | 30 | (Note: People, Hell and Angels: Australia No. 29, Austria No. 18, Belgium (Nl) No. 11, Belgium (Fr) No. 13, Germany No. 15, Netherlands No. 2, New Zealand No. 12, Norway No. 29, Sweden No. 14, Switzerland No. 7) | |
| 2013 | Released: March 5, 2013; Label: Legacy (88765 41898 2); Formats: CD, double LP | Released: March 4, 2013; Label: Sony; Format: CD | 2 | 30 | (Note: People, Hell and Angels: Australia No. 29, Austria No. 18, Belgium (Nl) No. 11, Belgium (Fr) No. 13, Germany No. 15, Netherlands No. 2, New Zealand No. 12, Norway No. 29, Sweden No. 14, Switzerland No. 7) | |
| 2018 | Both Sides of the Sky | | 8 | 8 | (Note: Both Sides of the Sky: Australia No. 20, Austria No. 9, Belgium (Nl) No. 8, Belgium (Fr) No. 19, Germany No. 7, Netherlands No. 10, New Zealand No. 39, Norway No. 25, Sweden No. 15, Switzerland No. 8) | |
| 2018 | Released: March 9, 2018; Label: Legacy (19075 81419 2); Formats: CD, double LP | Released: March 9, 2018; Label: Sony; Format: CD, double LP | 8 | 8 | (Note: Both Sides of the Sky: Australia No. 20, Austria No. 9, Belgium (Nl) No. 8, Belgium (Fr) No. 19, Germany No. 7, Netherlands No. 10, New Zealand No. 39, Norway No. 25, Sweden No. 15, Switzerland No. 8) | |

== Live albums ==
| Year | Album details | | Peak chart positions | | | Certifications (sales thresholds) |
| Year | Album details | | US | UK | Other | Certifications (sales thresholds) |
| Year | US release | UK release | US | UK | Other | Certifications (sales thresholds) |
|---|---|---|---|---|---|---|
| 1971 | Woodstock Two (Note: Woodstock Two: Various artists, Hendrix performs "Jam Back at the House", "Izabella", "Get My Heart Back Together") | | 8 | — | — | RIAA: Gold |
| 1971 | Released: April 1971; Label: Cotillion (SD 2-400); Format: 2LP record | Released: April 1971; Label: Atlantic (K600002); Format: 2LP | 8 | — | — | RIAA: Gold |
| 1971 | Experience | | — | 9 | (Note: Experience: Germany No. 46) | |
| 1971 | Not released | Released: August 1971; Label: Ember (NR 5057); Format: LP record | — | 9 | (Note: Experience: Germany No. 46) | |
| 1971 | The First Great Rock Festivals of the Seventies: Isle of Wight/Atlanta Pop Festival (Note: First Great Rock Festivals: Various artists, Hendrix performs "Message to Love" (listed as "Power to Love"), "Mightnight Lightning", "Foxy Lady" at Isle of Wight 1970) | | 47 | — | — | |
| 1971 | Released: September 1971; Label: Columbia (G3X 30805); Format: 3LP | Released: October 1971; Label: CBS (S 66311); Format: 3LP | 47 | — | — | |
| 1971 | Isle of Wight | | — | 17 | (Note: Isle of Wight: Norway No. 26) | |
| 1971 | Not released | Released: November 1971; Label: Polydor (2302 016); Format: LP | — | 17 | (Note: Isle of Wight: Norway No. 26) | |
| 1972 | Hendrix in the West | | 12 | 7 | (Note: Hendrix in the West: US R&B No. 12, Canada No. 11, Germany No. 48) | RIAA: Gold |
| 1972 | Released: February 1972; Label: Reprise (MS 2049); Format: LP | Released: January 1972; Label: Polydor (2302 018); Format: LP | 12 | 7 | (Note: Hendrix in the West: US R&B No. 12, Canada No. 11, Germany No. 48) | RIAA: Gold |
| 1972 | More Experience | | — | — | — | |
| 1972 | Not released | Released: March 1972; Label: Ember (NR 5061); Format: LP | — | — | — | |
| 1982 | The Jimi Hendrix Concerts | | 79 | 16 | (Note: The Jimi Hendrix Concerts: Canada No. 79) | |
| 1982 | Released: August 1982; Label: Reprise (MS 2306-1); Format: 2LP, audio cassette | Released: August 1982; Label: CBS (88592); Format: 2LP, cassette | 79 | 16 | (Note: The Jimi Hendrix Concerts: Canada No. 79) | |
| 1986 | Jimi Plays Monterey | | 192 | — | (Note: Jimi Plays Monterey: New Zealand No. 30) | |
| 1986 | Released: February 1986; Label: Reprise (25358-1); Formats: CD, LP, cassette | Not released | 192 | — | (Note: Jimi Plays Monterey: New Zealand No. 30) | |
| 1986 | Johnny B. Goode | | — | — | — | |
| 1986 | Released: June 1986; Label: Capitol (MLP 15022); Format: LP, cassette | Released: 1986; Label: Capitol/EMI (FA 3160); Format: LP, cassette | — | — | — | |
| 1986 | Band of Gypsys 2 | | — | — | (Note: Band of Gypsys 2: New Zealand No. 44) | |
| 1986 | Released: October 1986; Label: Capitol (SJ-12416); Format: LP, cassette | Not released | — | — | (Note: Band of Gypsys 2: New Zealand No. 44) | |
| 1987 | Live at Winterland | | — | — | (Note: Live at Winterland: US Billboard CD Top-30 No. 11, Netherlands No. 69, New Zealand No. 40) | |
| 1987 | Released: May 1987; Label: Rykodisc (RCD 20038); Formats: CD, 2LP | Not released | — | — | (Note: Live at Winterland: US Billboard CD Top-30 No. 11, Netherlands No. 69, New Zealand No. 40) | |
| 1988 | Radio One | | 119 | 30 | (Note: Radio One: Australia No. 44) | BPI: Gold |
| 1988 | Released: November 1988; Label: Rykodisc (RCD 20078); Formats: CD, 2LP | Released: February 1, 1989; Label: Castle (CCSCD 212); Formats: CD, 2LP | 119 | 30 | (Note: Radio One: Australia No. 44) | BPI: Gold |
| 1989 | Live & Unreleased: The Radio Show | | — | — | — | |
| 1989 | Not released | Released: November 20, 1989; Label: Castle (HB 100); Format: Box set 3CD, 5LP | — | — | — | |
| 1991 | Stages | | — | — | — | |
| 1991 | Released: November 14, 1991; Labels: Reprise (9 26732-2); Format: Box set 4CD | Released: February 1992; Labels: Polydor (511 763-2); Format: Box set 4CD | — | — | — | |
| 1991 | Live Isle of Wight '70 | | — | — | (Note: Live Isle of Wight '70: Norway No. 26) | |
| 1991 | Not released | Released: 1991; Label: Polydor 847 236-2; Format: CD, LP | — | — | (Note: Live Isle of Wight '70: Norway No. 26) | |
| 1994 | Woodstock | | 37 | 32 | (Note: Woodstock: US R&B No. 45, Australia No. 34, Austria No. 37, Canada No. 41, Germany No. 55, Netherlands No. 67, Sweden No. 40, Switzerland No. 25) | |
| 1994 | Released: August 20, 1994; Label: MCA (MCAD-11603); Format: CD | Released: 1994; Label: Polydor (523 384-2); Format: CD | 37 | 32 | (Note: Woodstock: US R&B No. 45, Australia No. 34, Austria No. 37, Canada No. 41, Germany No. 55, Netherlands No. 67, Sweden No. 40, Switzerland No. 25) | |
| 1996 | Message to Love: The Isle of Wight Festival 1970 (Note: Message to Love: Various artists, Hendrix performs "Voodoo Child (Slight Return)") | | — | — | — | |
| 1996 | Released: October 29, 1996; Label: Legacy (C2K 65058); Format: 2CD | Released: 1996; Label: Castle (EDF CD 327); Format: 2CD | — | — | — | |
| 1998 | BBC Sessions | | 50 | 42 | (Note: BBC Sessions: Canada No. 91, Sweden No. 53) | RIAA: Platinum; BPI: Silver |
| 1998 | Released: June 2, 1998; Label: MCA (MCAD2-11742); Formats: 2CD, 3LP | Released: June 1, 1998; Label: MCA (MCD 11742); Format: 2CD | 50 | 42 | (Note: BBC Sessions: Canada No. 91, Sweden No. 53) | RIAA: Platinum; BPI: Silver |
| 1999 | Live at the Fillmore East | | 65 | 87 | (Note: Live at the Fillmore East: Canada No. 77) | |
| 1999 | Released: February 23, 1999; Label: MCA (MCAD2-11931); Formats: 2CD, 3LP | Released: 1999; Label: MCA (MCD-11931/111 931-2); Format: 2CD | 65 | 87 | (Note: Live at the Fillmore East: Canada No. 77) | |
| 1999 | Live at Woodstock | | 90 | 76 | — | RIAA: Gold |
| 1999 | Released: July 7, 1999; Label: MCA (MCAD2-11987); Formats: 2CD, 3LP | Released: 1999; Label: MCA (MCD 11987/111 987-2); Format: 2CD | 90 | 76 | — | RIAA: Gold |
| 2002 | Blue Wild Angel: Live at the Isle of Wight | | 200 | — | | |
| 2002 | Released: November 12, 2002; Label: MCA (088 113 087-2); Formats: 2CD, 3LP | Released: 2002; Label: MCA (113 086-2); Format: 2CD | 200 | — | | |
| 2003 | Live at Berkeley | | 191 | — | | |
| 2003 | Released: September 16, 2003; Label: MCA (B0001102-02); Formats: CD, LP | Released: 2003; Label: MCA; Format: CD | 191 | — | | |
| 2007 | Live at Monterey | | 123 | — | — | |
| 2007 | Released: October 16, 2007; Label: MCA (1-25358); Formats: CD, LP | Released: 2007; Label: MCA; Format: CD | 123 | — | — | |
| 2011 | Winterland | | 49 | 92 | (Note: Winterland: Belgium (Fr) No. 89, Netherlands No. 93, Switzerland No. 96) | |
| 2011 | Released: September 13, 2011; Label: Legacy (88697936192); Formats: Box set 4CD, 8LP, 5CD, CD | Released: 2011; Label: Sony; Format: CD | 49 | 92 | (Note: Winterland: Belgium (Fr) No. 89, Netherlands No. 93, Switzerland No. 96) | |
| 2013 | Miami Pop Festival | | 39 | — | (Note: Miami Pop Festival: Belgium (Fr) No. 120) | |
| 2013 | Released: November 5, 2013; Label: Legacy (88883769922); Formats: CD, 2LP | Released: 2013; Label: Sony; Format: CD | 39 | — | (Note: Miami Pop Festival: Belgium (Fr) No. 120) | |
| 2015 | Freedom: Atlanta Pop Festival | | 63 | 87 | (Note: Freedom: Atlanta Pop Festival: Belgium (Nl) No. 75, Belgium (Fr) No. 33, Germany No. 51, Netherlands No. 22) | |
| 2015 | Released: August 28, 2015; Label: Legacy (88875109222); Formats: 2CD, 2LP | Released: 2015; Label: Legacy/Sony; Format: 2CD, 2LP | 63 | 87 | (Note: Freedom: Atlanta Pop Festival: Belgium (Nl) No. 75, Belgium (Fr) No. 33, Germany No. 51, Netherlands No. 22) | |
| 2016 | Machine Gun: The Fillmore East First Show | | 66 | 80 | (Note: Machine Gun: The Fillmore East First Show: Belgium (Nl) No. 68, Belgium (Fr) No. 29, Netherlands No. 46) | |
| 2016 | Released: September 30, 2016; Label: Legacy (88985354162); Formats: CD, 2LP, SACD | Released: 2016; Label: Legacy; Format: CD, 2LP | 66 | 80 | (Note: Machine Gun: The Fillmore East First Show: Belgium (Nl) No. 68, Belgium (Fr) No. 29, Netherlands No. 46) | |
| 2019 | Songs for Groovy Children: The Fillmore East Concerts | | — | — | (Note: Songs for Groovy Children: US Billboard Hard Rock Album Sales No. 2, Belgium (Nl) No. 181, Belgium (Fr) No. 67, Germany No. 64, Switzerland No. 96) | |
| 2019 | Released: November 22, 2019 (CDs), December 13, 2019 (LPs); Label: Legacy (19075982772); Formats: 5CD, 8LP | Released: 2019; Label: Legacy/Sony; Format: 5CD, 8LP | — | — | (Note: Songs for Groovy Children: US Billboard Hard Rock Album Sales No. 2, Belgium (Nl) No. 181, Belgium (Fr) No. 67, Germany No. 64, Switzerland No. 96) | |
| 2020 | Live in Maui | | 155 | — | (Note: Live in Maui: Belgium (Fr) No. 118, Germany No. 44, Switzerland No. 38) | |
| 2020 | Released: November 20, 2020; Label: Legacy (19439799042); Formats: 2CD, 3LP | Released: 2020; Label: Legacy/Sony; Format: 2CD, 3LP | 155 | — | (Note: Live in Maui: Belgium (Fr) No. 118, Germany No. 44, Switzerland No. 38) | |
| 2022 | Los Angeles Forum: April 26, 1969 | | 164 | 88 | (Note: Los Angeles Forum: April 26, 1969: Austria No. 41, Belgium (Nl) No. 114, Belgium (Fr) No. 69, Germany No. 40, Netherlands No. 65, Switzerland No. 19) | |
| 2022 | Released: November 18, 2022; Label: Legacy (19658724672); Formats: CD, 2LP | Released: 2022; Label: Legacy/Sony; Format: CD, 2LP | 164 | 88 | (Note: Los Angeles Forum: April 26, 1969: Austria No. 41, Belgium (Nl) No. 114, Belgium (Fr) No. 69, Germany No. 40, Netherlands No. 65, Switzerland No. 19) | |
| 2023 | Live at the Hollywood Bowl: August 18, 1967 | | — | — | — | |
| 2023 | Released: November 13, 2023; Label: Legacy (19658831551); Formats: CD, LP | Released: 2023; Label: Legacy/Sony; Format: CD, LP | — | — | — | |
"—" denotes a release that did not chart or was not issued in that region.

| Year | Album details | | Peak chart positions | | |
| Year | Album details | | US | UK | Other |
| Year | US release | UK release | US | UK | Other |
|---|---|---|---|---|---|
| 1973 | Soundtrack Recordings from the Film Jimi Hendrix | | 89 | 37 | (Note: Soundtrack Recordings from the Film Jimi Hendrix: US R&B No. 46) |
| 1973 | Released: July 1973; Label: Reprise (2RS 6481); Format: 2LP record, Reel to Reel Tape 7 1/2 IPS | Released: June 14, 1973; Label: Reprise (K 64017); Format: 2LP | 89 | 37 | (Note: Soundtrack Recordings from the Film Jimi Hendrix: US R&B No. 46) |
| 1975 | Musique Originale du Film Jimi Plays Berkeley (Note: Shapiro and Glebbeek write: "This is not a soundtrack from the film Jimi Plays Berkeley as the title of this release may suggest. In fact only 'Johnny B. Goode' and 'Lover Man' are from Berkeley". Both songs had already been released on Hendrix in the West three years earlier; the rest of the album tracks were also released previously.) | | — | — | — |
| 1975 | Not released | Released: 1975 (France); Label: Barclay (80.555); Format: LP record | — | — | — |
"—" denotes a release that did not chart or was not issued in that region.

== Anthologies and retrospective albums ==
| Year | Album details | | Peak chart positions | | | Certifications (sales thresholds) |
| Year | Album details | | US | UK | Other | Certifications (sales thresholds) |
| Year | US release | UK release | US | UK | Other | Certifications (sales thresholds) |
|---|---|---|---|---|---|---|
| 1973 | Jimi Hendrix | | — | — | — | |
| 1973 | Not released | Released: 1973; Label: Polydor Standard (2343080); Format: LP | — | — | — | |
| 1978 | The Essential Jimi Hendrix | | 114 | — | — | |
| 1978 | Not released | Released: 1975 (Netherlands); Label: Polydor (2679036); Format: 2LP | 114 | — | — | |
| 1978 | The Essential Jimi Hendrix | | 114 | — | — | |
| 1978 | Released: July 1978; Label: Reprise (2RS 2245); Format: 2LP | Released: 1978; Label: Polydor (2612 034); Format: 2LP | 114 | — | — | |
| 1979 | The Essential Jimi Hendrix Volume Two | | 156 | — | — | |
| 1979 | Released: July 1979; Label: Reprise (2RS 2293); Format: LP | Released: January 1981; Label: Polydor (2311 014); Format: LP | 156 | — | — | |
| 1981 | Stone Free | | — | — | — | |
| 1981 | Not released | Released: 1981; Label: Polydor; Format: LP | — | — | — | |
| 1983 | The Singles Album | | — | 77 | — | |
| 1983 | Not released | Released: February 1983; Label: Polydor (PODV 6); Format: 2LP | — | 77 | — | |
| 1984 | Kiss the Sky | | 157 | — | — | |
| 1984 | Released: October 1984; Label: Reprise (25119); Formats: CD, LP | Released: November 1984; Labels: Polydor (823 704-1); Formats: CD, LP | 157 | — | — | |
| 1989 | The Essential Jimi Hendrix Volumes One and Two | | — | — | — | |
| 1989 | Released: November 1989; Label: Reprise (26035-2); Format: 2CD | Not released | — | — | — | |
| 1990 | Cornerstones: 1967–1970 | | — | 16 | (Note: Cornerstones: 1967–1970: Australia No. 32, Netherlands No. 22) | BPI: Gold |
| 1990 | Not released | Released: October 22, 1990; Label: Polydor (847 231); Formats: CD, LP | — | 16 | (Note: Cornerstones: 1967–1970: Australia No. 32, Netherlands No. 22) | BPI: Gold |
| 1990 | Lifelines: The Jimi Hendrix Story | | 174 | — | — | |
| 1990 | Released: November 27, 1990; Label: Reprise (9 26435-2); Format: Box set 4CD | Not released | 174 | — | — | |
| 1992 | The Ultimate Experience | | 72 | 25 | (Note: The Ultimate Experience: Australia No. 7, Canada No. 21, Germany No. 61, Netherlands No. 70, New Zealand No. 1, Sweden No. 20) | RIAA: 3× Platinum; ARIA: 2× Platinum; BPI: Gold; MC: 2× Platinum |
| 1992 | Released: 1993; Labels: MCA (10829); Formats: CD, LP | Released: November 2, 1992; Labels: Polydor (517 235-2); Formats: CD, LP | 72 | 25 | (Note: The Ultimate Experience: Australia No. 7, Canada No. 21, Germany No. 61, Netherlands No. 70, New Zealand No. 1, Sweden No. 20) | RIAA: 3× Platinum; ARIA: 2× Platinum; BPI: Gold; MC: 2× Platinum |
| 1993 | The Experience Collection | | — | — | — | |
| 1993 | Released: 1993; Label: MCA (MCAD4-10936); Format: Box set 4CD | Not released | — | — | — | |
| 1994 | Blues | | 45 | 10 | (Note: Blues: US R&B No. 38, US Top Blues Albums No. 4, Australia No. 2, Canada No. 24, Germany No. 60, Netherlands No. 44, New Zealand No. 4, Sweden No. 14, Switzerland No. 14) | RIAA: Platinum; ARIA: Gold; MC: Gold |
| 1994 | Released: April 26, 1994; Labels: MCA (MCAD-11060); Format: CD | Released: April 18, 1994; Labels: Polydor (521 037-2); Format: CD | 45 | 10 | (Note: Blues: US R&B No. 38, US Top Blues Albums No. 4, Australia No. 2, Canada No. 24, Germany No. 60, Netherlands No. 44, New Zealand No. 4, Sweden No. 14, Switzerland No. 14) | RIAA: Platinum; ARIA: Gold; MC: Gold |
| 1997 | Experience Hendrix: The Best of Jimi Hendrix | | 133 | 10 | (Note: Experience Hendrix: The Best of Jimi Hendrix: Australia No. 33, Austria No. 9, Belgium (Nl) No. 36, Belgium (Fr) No. 36, Canada No. 34, Germany No. 49, Netherlands No. 42, New Zealand No. 25, Norway No. 39, Sweden No. 15, Switzerland No. 92) | RIAA: 3× Platinum; ARIA: Gold; BPI: Gold; IFPI NOR: Gold |
| 1997 | Released: September 16, 1997; Label: MCA (MCAD 11761); Formats: CD, LP | Released: 1997; Label: MCA; Format: CD, LP | 133 | 10 | (Note: Experience Hendrix: The Best of Jimi Hendrix: Australia No. 33, Austria No. 9, Belgium (Nl) No. 36, Belgium (Fr) No. 36, Canada No. 34, Germany No. 49, Netherlands No. 42, New Zealand No. 25, Norway No. 39, Sweden No. 15, Switzerland No. 92) | RIAA: 3× Platinum; ARIA: Gold; BPI: Gold; IFPI NOR: Gold |
| 2000 | The Jimi Hendrix Experience | | 78 | — | (Note: The Jimi Hendrix Experience: US Top Internet Albums No. 5, Netherlands No. 79) | RIAA: Platinum |
| 2000 | Released: September 12, 2000; Label: MCA (112 316-2); Formats: Box set 4CD, 8LP | Released: 2000; Label: MCA; Formats: Box set 4CD, 8LP | 78 | — | (Note: The Jimi Hendrix Experience: US Top Internet Albums No. 5, Netherlands No. 79) | RIAA: Platinum |
| 2001 | Voodoo Child: The Jimi Hendrix Collection | | 112 | 10 | — | RIAA: Gold; BPI: Gold |
| 2001 | Released: May 8, 2001; Label: MCA/Universal (088 112 603-2); Format: 2CD | Released: 2001; Label: MCA (170 322-2); Format: 2CD | 112 | 10 | — | RIAA: Gold; BPI: Gold |
| 2003 | The Singles Collection | | — | — | — | |
| 2003 | Released: 2003; Label: MCA; Format: Box set 10CD | Released: 2003; Label: MCA; Format: Box set 10CD | — | — | — | |
| 2003 | Martin Scorsese Presents the Blues: Jimi Hendrix | | — | — | (Note: Martin Scorsese Presents the Blues: Jimi Hendrix: US Top Blues Albums No. 4) | |
| 2003 | Released: September 16, 2003; Label: MCA (B0000698-02); Format: CD | Released: 2003; Label: MCA; Format: CD | — | — | (Note: Martin Scorsese Presents the Blues: Jimi Hendrix: US Top Blues Albums No. 4) | |
| 2010 | Fire: The Jimi Hendrix Collection | | — | 29 | — | BPI: Silver |
| 2010 | Released: June 7, 2010; Label: Legacy (88697 73857 2); Format: CD | Released: 2010; Label: Sony; Format: CD | — | 29 | — | BPI: Silver |
| 2010 | West Coast Seattle Boy: The Jimi Hendrix Anthology | | — | — | (Note: West Coast Seattle Boy: The Jimi Hendrix Anthology: US Top Hard Rock Albums No. 9, Germany No. 72, Switzerland No. 86) | |
| 2010 | Released: November 16, 2010; Label: Legacy (88697 77037 2); Formats: Box set 4CD, 8LP, +DVD | Released: 2010; Label: Sony; Formats: Box set 4CD, 8LP, +DVD | — | — | (Note: West Coast Seattle Boy: The Jimi Hendrix Anthology: US Top Hard Rock Albums No. 9, Germany No. 72, Switzerland No. 86) | |
| 2024 | Electric Lady Studios - A Jimi Hendrix Vision | | — | — | — | |
| 2024 | Released: October 4, 2024; Label: Legacy; Formats: Triple CD & Blu-ray | Released: 2024; Label: Sony; Format: Triple CD & Blu-ray | — | — | — | |
"—" denotes a release that did not chart or was not issued in that region.

== Singles ==
| Year | Single details | Peak chart positions | | | Certifications | Album |
| Year | Single details | US | UK | Other | Certifications | Album |
|---|---|---|---|---|---|---|
| 1970 | "Voodoo Chile [sic]" / "Hey Joe" & "All Along the Watchtower": Released: October 23, 1970 (UK); Label: Track (2095 001); Format: 7-inch maxi single | — | 1 | (Note: "Voodoo Chile/Voodoo Child": Germany: No. 24, Netherlands: No. 4) | BPI: Gold (Note: "Voodoo Child (Slight Return") | Electric Ladyland, Are You Experienced (Note: Are You Experienced expanded CD editions with both UK and US tracks) |
| 1970 | "Voodoo Chile [sic]" / "Hey Joe" & "All Along the Watchtower": Released: October 23, 1970 (UK); Label: Track (2095 001); Format: 7-inch maxi single | — | 1 | (Note: "Voodoo Chile/Voodoo Child": Germany: No. 24, Netherlands: No. 4) | BPI: Silver (Note: "Hey Joe") | Electric Ladyland, Are You Experienced |
| 1970 | "Voodoo Chile [sic]" / "Hey Joe" & "All Along the Watchtower": Released: October 23, 1970 (UK); Label: Track (2095 001); Format: 7-inch maxi single | — | 1 | (Note: "Voodoo Chile/Voodoo Child": Germany: No. 24, Netherlands: No. 4) | BPI: Platinum (Note: "All Along the Watchflower") | Electric Ladyland, Are You Experienced |
| 1971 | "Freedom" / "Angel": Released: March 18, 1971 (US); Label: Reprise (1000); Format: 7-inch single | 59 | — | (Note: "Angel": Canada No. 70, Germany No. 50 (released as A-side, backed with "Freedom")) | | The Cry of Love |
| 1971 | "Angel" / "Night Bird Flying": Released: April 2, 1971 (UK); Label: Track (2094 007); Format: 7-inch | — | — | — | | The Cry of Love |
| 1971 | "Dolly Dagger" / "The Star-Spangled Banner": Released: October 23, 1971 (US); Label: Reprise (1044); Format: 7-inch | 74 | — | (Note: "Dolly Dagger": Canada No. 39) | | Rainbow Bridge |
| 1971 | "Gypsy Eyes" / "Remember" / "Purple Haze" / "Stone Free": Released: October 15, 1971 (UK); Label: Track (2094010); Format: 7-inch maxi single | — | 35 | — | BPI: Gold (Note: "Purple Haze") | Electric Ladyland, Are You Experienced |
| 1972 | "Johnny B. Goode" / "Lover Man": Released: April 1972 (US); Label: Reprise (REP 1082); Format: 7-inch record | — | — | — | | Hendrix in the West |
| 1972 | "Johnny B. Goode" / "Little Wing": Released: February 4, 1972 (UK); Label: Polydor (2001-277); Format: 7-inch | — | 35 | (Note: "Johnny B. Goode": New Zealand No. 13) | BPI: Silver (Note: "Little Wing") | Hendrix in the West |
| 1972 | "The Wind Cries Mary" / "Little Wing": Released: September 1972 (US); Label: Reprise (REP 1118); Format: 7-inch | — | — | — | | Hendrix in the West |
| 1973 | "Hear My Train A Comin'" / "Rock Me Baby": Released: August 17, 1973 (UK); Label: Reprise (K 14286); Format: 7-inch | — | — | — | | Soundtrack Recordings from the Film Jimi Hendrix |
| 1982 | "Fire" / "Little Wing": Released: 1982 (US); Label: Reprise (7-29845); Format: 7-inch | — | — | — | | The Jimi Hendrix Concerts |
| 1982 | "Fire" / "Are You Experienced?": Released: 1982 (UK); Label: CBS (CBS A2749); Format: 7-inch | — | — | — | | The Jimi Hendrix Concerts |
| 1990 | "Crosstown Traffic" / "Voodoo Chile [sic]": Released: April 2, 1990 (UK); Label: Polydor (P 71); Format: 7-inch, 12-inch, CD; Notes: Additional tracks appear on different formats | — | 61 | — | | Electric Ladyland |
| 1990 | "All Along the Watchtower" / "Voodoo Chile [sic]" / "Hey Joe": Released: 1990 (UK); Label: Polydor (P 100); Format: 7-inch, 12-inch, CD; Notes: Additional tracks appear on different formats | — | 52 | — | | Electric Ladyland, Are You Experienced |
| 1997 | "Dolly Dagger" / "Night Bird Flying": Released: 1997; Label: MCA (MCA7P-55336); Format: CD | — | — | — | | First Rays of the New Rising Sun |
| 1999 | "The Star-Spangled Banner" / "Purple Haze": Released: 1999; Label: MCA (MCA13487); Format: CD | — | — | — | | Live at Woodstock |
| 2010 | "Valleys of Neptune" / "Cat Talkin' to Me" (Note: "Valleys of Neptune" alternate second track: "Peace in Mississippi"): Released: 2010; Label: Legacy (8697 64358 7); Format: CD | — | — | (Note: "Valleys of Neptune": Billboard Singles No. 1) | | Valleys of Neptune |
| 2010 | "Bleeding Heart" / "Jam 292" (Note: "Bleeding Heart" alternate second track: "Peace In Mississippi"): Released: 2010; Label: Legacy (8697 72972 7); Format: CD, 7-inch | — | — | — | | Valleys of Neptune |
| 2010 | "Love or Confusion" / "12 Bar with Horns": Released: 2010; Label: Legacy ( 8697 77217 2); Format: CD | — | — | (Note: "Love or Confusion": Billboard Hot Singles No. 4) | | West Coast Seattle Boy |
| 2011 | "Fire" / "Touch You": Released: 2011; Label: Legacy (8697 8581 7); Format: CD | — | — | — | | West Coast Seattle Boy |
| 2011 | "Johnny B. Goode" / "Purple Haze": Released: 2011; Label: Legacy (8697 93621 7); Format: CD | — | — | — | | Hendrix in the West |
| 2011 | "Like a Rolling Stone" / "Spanish Castle Magic": Released: 2011; Label: Legacy (8869 793620 2); Format: CD | — | — | — | | Winterland |
| 2012 | "Can You Please Crawl Out Your Window?" / "Burning of the Midnight Lamp": Released: 2012; Label: Sundazed/Experience Hendrix (S 230); Format: CD, 7-inch | — | — | — | | BBC Sessions |
| 2012 | "Come On (Let the Good Times Roll)" / "Calling All the Devil's Children": Released: 2012; Label: Sundazed/Experience Hendrix (S 256); Format: CD, 7-inch | — | — | — | | Electric Ladyland, West Coast Seattle Boy |
| 2013 | "Somewhere" / "Foxy Lady" (Note: "Somewhere" alternate second track: "Power of Soul"): Released: 2013; Label: Legacy (8876 543953 2); Format: CD, 7-inch | — | — | (Note: "Somewhere": Japan: No. 80) | | People, Hell and Angels |
| 2013 | "Fire" / "Foxey Lady": Released: 2013; Label: Legacy (88883791727); Format: 7-inch | — | — | — | | Miami Pop Festival |
| 2013 | "Dolly Dagger" / "Star Spangled Banner": Released: 2013; Label: Experience Hendrix (1044); Format: 7-inch | — | — | — | | Rainbow Bridge |
| 2015 | "Purple Haze" / "Freedom": Released: 2015; Label: Legacy (88875073207); Format: 7-inch single | — | — | — | | Freedom: Atlanta Pop Festival |
| 2018 | "Mannish Boy" / "Trash Man": Released: April 21, 2018 (Record Store Day); Label: Legacy (19075836037); Format: 7-inch | — | — | — | | Both Sides of the Sky, Hear My Music |
"—" denotes a release that did not chart

== Extended plays and special releases ==
| Year | Details | Track listing |
|---|---|---|
| 1974 | ...And a Happy New Year': Released: December 1974 (US); Label: Reprise (PRO 595); Format: 7-inch single; Notes: Promotional, re-released in 1979 as a 12-inch single (Reprise PRO-A 840); released commercially in 1999 as Merry Christmas and Happy New Year | 1. "The Little Drummer Boy" / "Silent Night" / "Auld Lang Syne"; 2. "Three Little Bears"; 3. "The Little Drummer Boy" / "Silent Night" / "Auld Lang Syne" (extended version) |
| 1978 | Gloria: Released: July 1978 (UK), July 1979 (US); Label: Polydor (UK) (2612 034), Reprise (US) (EP 2293); Format: 7-inch maxi single; Notes: Bonus disc with The Essential Jimi Hendrix (UK) & The Essential Jimi Hendrix Volume Two (US) | 1. "Gloria" |
| 1980 | 6 Singles Pack: Released: 1980 (UK); Label: Polydor (260 8001); Format: 7-inch singles; Notes: Limited edition box set of first 5 UK singles, plus "Voodoo Chile [sic]" / "Gloria" | 1. "Hey Joe" / "Stone Free"; 2. "Purple Haze" / "51st Anniversary"; 3. "The Wind Cries Mary" / "Highway Chile"; 4. "Burning of the Midnight Lamp" / "The Stars That Play with Laughing Sam's Dice"; 5. "All Along the Watchtower" / "Long Hot Summer Night"; 6. "Voodoo Chile [sic]" / "Gloria" |
| 1982 | All Along the Watchtower: Released: 1982 (UK); Labels: Polydor (POSPX401); Format: 12-inch | 1. "All Along the Watchtower"; 2. "Foxy Lady"; 3. "Purple Haze"; 4. "Manic Depression" |
| 1982 | Voodoo Chile: Released: 1982 (UK); Labels: Polydor (POSPX608); Format: 12-inch | 1. "Voodoo Chile (Slight Return) [sic]" 2. "Gypsy Eyes"; 3. "Hey Joe"; 4. "3rd Stone from the Sun" |
| 1988 | Day Tripper: Released: 1988; Label: Rykodisc (RCD31-008); Formats: CD; Notes: Promo sampler for Radio One, included on BBC Sessions | 1. "Day Tripper"; 2. "Drivin' South"; 3. "Hear My Train A Comin'" |
| 1988 | The Peel Sessions: Released: 1988 (UK); Label: Strange Fruit (SFPSCD065); Format: CD; Notes: 5 tracks from Top Gear radio program with John Peel, included on BBC sessions | 1. "Radio One Theme"; 2. "Day Tripper"; 3. "Wait Until Tomorrow"; 4. "Hear My Train A Comin'"; 5. "Spanish Castle Magic" |
| 1989 | Radio Radio: Released: 1989; Label: Rykodisc (PRO-00785); Format: CD; Notes: Promo sampler for Radio One, included on BBC sessions | 1. "Day Tripper"; 2. "Hoochie Koochie Man"; 3. "Hound Dog"; 4. "Hear My Train A Comin'"; 5. "Stone Free" |
| 1989 | Purple Haze: Released: February 6, 1989 (UK); Label: Polydor (P 33); Format: 7-inch, 12-inch, CD; Notes: Promo sampler for The Singles Album re-release; additional tracks appear on different formats | 1. "Purple Haze"; 2. "51st Anniversary" |
| 1990 | Between the Lines: Released: 1990 (US); Labels: Reprise (PRO-CD 4541); Format: CD single; Notes: Promo sampler for Lifelines: The Jimi Hendrix Story | 1. Jimi Hendrix Narration; 2. "Hey Joe"; 3. "I'm a Man"; 4. Pete Townshend and Eric Clapton Narration / "Red House"; 5. Jimi Hendrix Narration / "Drivin' South"; 6. "The Things That I Used to Do"; 7. "1983... (A Merman I Should Turn to Be)"; 8. "Purple Haze"; 9. "Rainy Day Shuffle"; 10. "Angel" |
| 1991 | Stages '67 – '70 Sampler: Released: 1990; Labels: Reprise (PRO-CD 5194); Format: CD; Notes: Promo sampler for Stages | 1. "Hey Joe"; 2. "Burning of the Midnight Lamp"; 3. "Purple Haze"; 4. "The Wind Cries Mary"; 5. "Red House"; 6. "Voodoo Child (Slight Return)"; 7. "Spanish Castle Magic; 8. "Hear My Train A Comin'" |
| 1991 | Jimi Plays Berkeley: Released: 1991; Labels: BMG (791 168); Format: CD; Notes: CD included with Jimi Plays Berkeley video | 1. "Freedom"; 2. "Red House"; 3. "Ezy Ryder" |
| 1992 | Live at Winterland + 3: Released: 1992 (US); Labels: Rykodisc (RCD2038/+3); Format: CD; Notes: Issued with 1992 Live at Winterland box set, included on Winterland | 1. "Are You Experienced?"; 2. "Voodoo Chile [sic]" 3. "Like a Rolling Stone" |
| 1992 | The Wind Cries Mary: Released: 1992 (UK); Labels: Polydor (863917-1); Format: 12-inch; Notes: 3 tracks from The Ultimate Experience | 1. "The Wind Cries Mary"; 2. "Fire"; 3. "Foxy Lady"; 4. "May This Be Love" |
| 1995 | Stepping Stone: Released: 1995 (US); Labels: MCA (MCA5P-3357); Format: CD single; Notes: Promo sampler for Voodoo Soup, included on First Rays of the New Rising Sun | 1. "Stepping Stone" |
| 1997 | Jimi Hendrix: Released: 1997 (US); Labels: MCA (MCA5P-4079); Format: CD; Notes: Promo sampler with Fender; tracks from South Saturn Delta, First Rays of the New Rising Sun, and Are You Experienced | 1. "Power of Soul"; 2. "Freedom"; 3. "Foxy Lady" |
| 1998 | BBC Sessions: Released: 1998; Labels: MCA (MCA5P-4167); Format: CD; Notes: Promo sampler for BBC Sessions | 1. "Foxy Lady"; 2. "Hey Joe"; 3. "Love or Confusion"; 4. "Little Miss Lover"; 5. "Can You Please Crawl Out Your Window?"; 6. "(I'm Your) Hoochie Coochie Man"; 7. "Day Tripper"; 8. "Voodoo Child (Slight Return)" |
| 1999 | Get DMXperienced: Released: 1999 (US); Labels: Universal (31 4564998-2); Format: CD; Notes: Promo sampler with Reebok | 1. "Are You Experienced?"; 2. "Fire"; 3. "The Star-Spangled Banner" |
| 1999 | Live at the Fillmore East: Released: 1999; Labels: MCA (MCA5P-4319); Format: CD; Notes: Promo sampler for Live at the Fillmore East | 1. "Stepping Stone"; 2. "Machine Gun"; 3. "Changes"; 4. "Who Knows" |
| 1999 | Machine Gun: Released: 1999 (US); Labels: MCA (MCA5P-4320); Format: CD; Notes: Promo sampler with Sam Goody and Guitar World | 1. "Machine Gun" |
| 1999 | Live at Woodstock: Released: 1999; Labels: MCA (MCA5P-4372); Format: 7-inch, CD; Notes: Promo sampler for Live at Woodstock, CD has extra track "Spanish Castle Magic" | 1. "The Star-Spangled Banner"; 2. "Purple Haze" |
| 1999 | Merry Christmas and Happy New Year: Released: 1999; Labels: MCA (088 155 651); Format: CD, 10-inch; Notes: Commercial release of 1974 ...And a Happy New Year, reached No. 10 in 1999 & #16 in 2000 in Canada; re-released 2010 with two tracks & alternative cover (Legacy 88697-77228-1), reached No. 4 in 2010 on Billboard Overall Singles chart | 1. "The Little Drummer Boy" / "Silent Night" / "Auld Lang Syne"; 2. "Three Little Bears"; 3. "The Little Drummer Boy" / "Silent Night" / "Auld Lang Syne" (extended version) |
| 2000 | The Jimi Hendrix Experience: Released: 2000 (UK); Labels: MCA (JHPRO1); Format: CD; Notes: 4-song promo sampler for The Jimi Hendrix Experience box set | 1. "Purple Haze"; 2. "Little Miss Lover"; 3. "Spanish Castle Magic"; 4. "Lover Man" |
| 2000 | The Jimi Hendrix Experience: Released: 2000 (US); Labels: MCA (JHPRO2); Format: CD; Notes: 8-song promo sampler for The Jimi Hendrix Experience box set | 1. "Purple Haze"; 2. "Little Wing"; 3. "Sgt. Peppers Lonely Hearts Club"; 4. "Stone Free"; 5. "Gloria"; 6. "It's Too Bad"; 7. "Lover Man"; 8. "All Along the Watchtower" |
| 2002 | Voodoo Child: The Jimi Hendrix Collection: Released: 2002; Labels: MCA (JH01); Format: CD; Notes: Promo sampler for Voodoo Child: The Jimi Hendrix Collection | 1. "Purple Haze"; 2. "Hey Joe"; 3. "Crosstown Traffic"; 4. "Third Stone from the Sun" |
| 2006 | Jimi Hendrix: 10 Tracks Performed Live at the Royal Albert Hall: Released: September 26, 2006 (UK); Labels: The Sunday Times; Format: CD; Notes: Free CD distributed with the newspaper | 1. "Little Wing"; 2. "Voodoo Chile [sic]" 3. "Room Full of Mirrors"; 4. "Fire"; 5. "Purple Haze"; 6. "Wild Thing"; 7. "Bleeding Heart"; 8. "Sunshine of Your Love"; 9. "Hey Joe"; 10. "Foxy Lady" |
| 2011 | San Francisco 1968: Released: 2011; Labels: Dagger (8869 794682 2); Format: CD; Notes: Bonus disc with some Winterland releases, included on Paris 1967/San Francisco 1968 | 1. "Killing Floor"; 2. "Red House"; 3. "Catfish Blues"; 4. "Dear Mr. Fantasy (Part One)"; 5. "Dear Mr. Fantasy (Part Two)" |

== Official bootlegs ==
=== Dagger Records releases ===
Dagger Records was established in 1998 by Experience Hendrix to issue "official bootlegs" of albums "that don't meet the technical recording criteria" and standards for mainstream release.

| Year | Title | Details |
|---|---|---|
| 1998 | Live at the Oakland Coliseum | April 27, 1969, live at Oakland Coliseum in Oakland, California |
| 1999 | Live at Clark University | March 15, 1968, live at Clark University in Worcester, Massachusetts |
| 2000 | Morning Symphony Ideas | Studio demos and unfinished songs recorded between 1969 and 1970 |
| 2001 | Live in Ottawa | March 19, 1968, live at Capitol Theatre in Ottawa, Canada |
| 2002 | The Baggy's Rehearsal Sessions | December 18–19, 1969, Band of Gypsys rehearsals at Baggy's Studio in New York |
| 2003 | Paris 1967/San Francisco 1968 | October 9, 1967, live at Olympia in Paris and February 4, 1968, at the Fillmore in San Francisco; in 2021, Dagger released an expanded edition titled Paris 1967. |
| 2004 | Hear My Music | February–April 1969 studio jams and unfinished songs recorded in London and New York City |
| 2005 | Live at the Isle of Fehmarn | September 6, 1970, live at Open Air Love & Peace Festival in Fehmarn, Germany |
| 2006 | Burning Desire | November 1969 – January 1970 Band of Gypsys studio jams and unfinished songs at Record Plant in New York |
| 2008 | Live in Paris & Ottawa 1968 | January 29, 1968, live at Olympia in Paris and March 19, 1968, at Capitol Theatre in Ottawa |
| 2009 | Live at Woburn | July 6, 1968, live at Woburn Music Festival in Woburn, Bedfordshire, UK |
| 2012 | Live in Cologne | January 13, 1969, live at Sporthalle, Cologne, Germany |

=== Experience Hendrix website ===
Several amateur recordings of Hendrix concerts are free to stream from the Experience Hendrix website. As of September 11, 2020, the following are available:

| Date(s) recorded | Venue | Location |
|---|---|---|
| February 14, 1968 | Regis College Fieldhouse | Denver, Colorado |
| February 16, 1968 | Dallas State Fair Music Hall | Dallas, Texas |
| February 18, 1968 | Houston Music Hall | Houston, Texas |
| December 1, 1968 | Chicago Coliseum | Chicago |
| January 17, 1969 | Jahrhunderthalle | Frankfurt, Germany |
| May 18, 1969 | Madison Square Garden | New York City |
| June 29, 1969 | Denver Pop Festival | Denver, Colorado |
| December 18–19, 1969 | Baggy's Studio | New York City |
| April 25, 1970 | Los Angeles Forum | Inglewood, California |
| June 7, 1970 | Assembly Center Arena | Tulsa, Oklahoma |
| June 13, 1970 | Baltimore Civic Center | Baltimore, Maryland |

== Hendrix as an accompanist ==
=== Albums as sideman ===
| Year | Artist | Title | Songs (guitar, except where noted) | Peak chart positions | |
| Year | Artist | Title | Songs (guitar, except where noted) | US | UK |
|---|---|---|---|---|---|
| 1970 | Stephen Stills | Stephen Stills: Released: November 1970; Label: Atlantic (SD 7202); Format: LP record | "Old Times Good Times" | 3 | 8 |
| 1970 | Love | False Start: Released: December 1970; Label: Blue Thumb (8104); Format: LP | "Everlasting First" | 184 | — |
| 1971 | Lonnie Youngblood | Two Great Experiences Together: Released: March 1971; Label: Maple (LPM 6004); Format: LP | "Wipe the Sweat", "Goodbye, Bessie Mae", "Soul Food (That's a What I Like)", "Under the Table" | 127 | — |
| 1971 | The Isley Brothers | In the Beginning: Released: 1971; Label: T-Neck (TNS 3007); Format: LP | "Move Over and Let Me Dance", "Have You Ever Been Disappointed?", "Testify", "The Last Girl", and "Looking for a Love" | — | — |
| 1972 | Little Richard | Friends from the Beginning – Little Richard and Jimi Hendrix: Released: 1972; Label: Ala (ALA 1972); Format: LP | No Hendrix involvement; only his name and image appear on the album cover and the liner notes imply his participation | — | — |
| 1972 | Lonnie Youngblood | Rare Hendrix: Released: July 1972; Label: Trip (TLP-9500); Format: LP | "Go Go Shoes" & "Go Go Place" | 82 | — |
| 2015 | Curtis Knight & the Squires | You Can't Use My Name: The RSVP/PPX Sessions: Released: March 24, 2015; Label: Legacy (88875077992); Formats: CD, LP | all tracks | — | — |
| 2017 | Curtis Knight | Live at George's Club 20 1965 & 1966: Released: February 28, 2017; Label: Dagger (88985410162); Formats: CD, double LP | all tracks | — | — |
| 2020 | Curtis Knight & the Squires | No Business: The PPX Sessions Volume 2: Released: October 23, 2020; Label: Dagger (19439800592); Formats: 2 CDs, double LP | all tracks | — | — |
"—" denotes a release that did not chart.

=== Singles as sideman ===
| Year | Artist | Title | Peak chart positions | | Posthumous Hendrix album |
| Year | Artist | Title | US | UK | Posthumous Hendrix album |
|---|---|---|---|---|---|
| 1970 | Love | "Everlasting First" / not on B-side: Released: Label: Blue Thumb (7116); Format: 7-inch 45 rpm record | — | — | West Coast Seattle Boy: The Jimi Hendrix Anthology |
| 1970 | Curtis Knight & the Squires | "Ballad of Jimi" / "Gloomy Monday": Released: October 16, 1970; Label: London UK (HLZ 10321); Format: 7-inch | — | — | You Can't Use My Name: The RSVP/PPX Sessions |
| 1971 | The Squires | "No Such Animal Part 1" / "No Such Animal Part 2": Released: February 1971; Label: RCA UK (2033); Format: 7-inch | — | — | You Can't Use My Name: The RSVP/PPX Sessions |
| 1984 | Lightnin' Rod | "Doriella Du Fontaine" / "Doriella Du Fontaine (instrumental)": Released: July 1984; Label: Celluloid (CART 232); Format: 12-inch single | — | — | none |
"—" denotes a release that did not chart.

== See also ==
- Jimi Hendrix videography
- List of songs recorded by Jimi Hendrix

== Notes ==
Footnotes

Citations

References

- Belmo; Loveless, Steve (1998). Jimi Hendrix: Experience the Music. Burlington, Ontario: Collector's Guide Publishing. ISBN 1-896522-45-9.
- Jimi Hendrix Encyclopedia (2012). "Jimi Hendrix Encyclopedia". Jimihendrix.com (official website).
- McDermott, John; Kramer, Eddie (1992). Hendrix: Setting the Record Straight. New York City: Warner Books. ISBN 0-446-39431-9.
- McDermott, John; Cox, Billy; Kramer, Eddie (1995). Jimi Hendrix: Sessions. New York City: Little, Brown. ISBN 0-316-55549-5.
- McDermott, John (1998). Live at the Oakland Coliseum (CD notes). Jimi Hendrix Experience. Seattle, Washington: Dagger Records. 08802-11743.
- McDermott, John; Kramer, Eddie; Cox, Billy (2009). Ultimate Hendrix. New York City: Backbeat Books. ISBN 978-0-87930-938-1.
- McDermott, John (2010). West Coast Seattle Boy: The Jimi Hendrix Anthology (CD/DVD set booklet). Jimi Hendrix. New York City: Legacy Recordings. 88697769272.
- Roby, Steven (2002). Black Gold: The Lost Archives of Jimi Hendrix. New York City: Billboard Books. ISBN 0-8230-7854-X.
- Roby, Steven; Schreiber, Brad (2010). Becoming Jimi Hendrix. Cambridge, Massachusetts: Da Capo Press. ISBN 978-0-306-81910-0.
- Shadwick, Keith (2003). Jimi Hendrix: Musician. San Francisco: Backbeat Books. ISBN 0-87930-764-1.
- Shapiro, Harry; Glebbeek, Cesar (1990). Jimi Hendrix: Electric Gypsy. New York City: St. Martin's Press. ISBN 0-312-05861-6.
- Strong, Martin Charles (2000). The Great Rock Discography. Edinburgh: Canongate. ISBN 978-0-862-41827-4.
- Whitburn, Joel (1988). Top R&B Singles 1942–1988. Menomonee Falls, Wisconsin: Record Research. ISBN 0-89820-068-7.
- Whitburn, Joel (2008). Joel Whitburn Presents: Across The Charts The 1960s. Menomonee Falls, Wisconsin: Record Research. ISBN 978-0898201758.
