= Live in Cologne =

Live album by the Jimi Hendrix Experience
- Released: November 27, 2012
- Recorded: January 13, 1969
- Venue: Sporthalle, Cologne, Germany
- Genre: Rock
- Length: 56:06
- Label: Dagger
- Producer: Janie Hendrix, John McDermott, Eddie Kramer

Hendrix album chronology
Live at Woburn (2009)	Live in Cologne (2012)	People, Hell and Angels (2013)

Live in Cologne is a posthumous live album by the Jimi Hendrix Experience. Released on November 27, 2012, the album documents the band's performance at the Sporthalle in Cologne, Germany, on January 13, 1969. It is the twelfth entry in the Dagger Records catalogue of official bootlegs released by the Experience Hendrix company and was originally released in LP record format only; a CD version was issued in July 2013.

== Track listing ==
No.	Title	Writer(s)	Length
1.	"Come On (Let the Good Times Roll)"	Earl King	5:30
2.	"Foxey Lady"	Jimi Hendrix	5:08
3.	"Red House"	Hendrix	12:33
4.	"Voodoo Child (Slight Return)"	Hendrix	6:42
5.	"Fire"	Hendrix	2:56
6.	"Spanish Castle Magic"	Hendrix	4:29
7.	"Hey Joe"	Billy Roberts	4:10
8.	"Sunshine of Your Love"	Jack Bruce, Eric Clapton, Pete Brown	6:41
9.	"Star Spangled Banner"	Francis Scott Key, John Stafford Smith	2:53
10.	"Purple Haze"	Hendrix	5:04

== Personnel ==
Musical personnel

- Jimi Hendrix – guitar, vocals
- Mitch Mitchell – drums
- Noel Redding – bass guitar

Production personnel

- Janie Hendrix – production
- John McDermott – production, liner notes
- Eddie Kramer – production
- George Marino – mastering

Artwork personnel

- Phil Yarnall – design
- Jeremy Ross – photography
- Greg Smith – photography
- Christian Spindler – photography
- Mark Johansen – photography
