= Live at the Isle of Fehmarn =

Live album by the Jimi Hendrix Experience
- Released: December 13, 2005
- Recorded: September 6, 1970
- Venue: Open Air Love & Peace Festival, Fehmarn, West Germany
- Genre: Rock
- Length: 72:11
- Label: Dagger

Jimi Hendrix chronology
Hear My Music (2004)	Live at the Isle of Fehmarn (2005)	Burning Desire (2006)

Live at the Isle of Fehmarn is a posthumous live album by Jimi Hendrix, released on December 13, 2005, by Dagger Records. It was recorded by the post-Band of Gypsys Jimi Hendrix Experience that included Hendrix, Mitch Mitchell, and Billy Cox. The album documents their performance at the Open Air Love & Peace Festival in Fehmarn, West Germany on September 6, 1970, which was Hendrix's final official concert performance.

Several amateur recordings were made and released as bootlegs over the years, and after a new audio recording made by the festival’s promoter surfaced, the album was mixed and produced. Indeed, unknown to Hendrix, the promoters captured the group’s entire performance by feeding two overhead stage microphones into a consumer grade Revox reel-to-reel tape machine located off to the side of the stage.

== Track listing ==
All songs were written by Jimi Hendrix, except where noted.

1. "Introduction" – 0:44
2. "Killing Floor" (Chester Arthur Burnett a.k.a. Howlin' Wolf) – 4:18
3. "Spanish Castle Magic" – 5:42
4. "All Along the Watchtower" (Bob Dylan) – 4:57
5. "Hey Joe" (Billy Roberts) – 4:42
6. "Hey Baby (New Rising Sun)" – 6:22
7. "Message to Love" – 5:27
8. "Foxy Lady" – 4:27
9. "Red House" – 10:49
10. "Ezy Ryder" – 3:51
11. "Freedom" – 4:51
12. "Room Full of Mirrors" – 3:57
13. "Purple Haze" – 3:16
14. "Voodoo Child (Slight Return)" – 7:13

== Personnel ==
- Jimi Hendrix – guitar, vocals
- Mitch Mitchell – drums
- Billy Cox – bass guitar, backing vocals
