= The Ultimate Experience =

Compilation album by Jimi Hendrix
- Released: November 2, 1992
- Recorded: October 23, 1966 – July 23, 1970
- Genre: Rock
- Length: 71:55
- Label: Polydor - MCA
- Compiler: Alan Douglas, Chris Griffin

Jimi Hendrix chronology
Live Isle of Wight '70 (1991)	The Ultimate Experience (1992)	Blues (1994)

Professional ratings
Review scores
Source	Rating
AllMusic	4.5/5 stars
Rolling Stone	4.5/5 stars
Tom Hull – on the Web	B+

The Ultimate Experience is a 1992 compilation album of songs by American musician Jimi Hendrix. It includes 20 tracks spanning his career. The album was among the last to be supervised by interim producer Alan Douglas, before the Hendrix family regained control of his recording legacy. It has gone out-of-print and, in 1997, was replaced by the 20 track compilation Experience Hendrix: The Best of Jimi Hendrix.

The Ultimate Experience was released in the United Kingdom in November 1992, and later on April 27, 1993, in the United States. The album reached No. 25 on the UK Albums Chart and No. 72 on the Billboard 200. It was certified as gold by the British Phonographic Industry, 3× platinum by the Recording Industry Association of America, and 2× platinum by Music Canada.

== Track listing ==
All songs were written by Jimi Hendrix, except where noted.

1. "All Along the Watchtower" (Bob Dylan) – 4:07 (Electric Ladyland, 1968)
2. "Purple Haze" – 2:44 (Are You Experienced, 1967)
3. "Hey Joe" (Billy Roberts) – 3:26 (Are You Experienced)
4. "The Wind Cries Mary" – 3:18 (Are You Experienced)
5. "Angel" – 4:17 (The Cry of Love, 1971)
6. "Voodoo Child (Slight Return)" – 5:13 (Electric Ladyland)
7. "Foxy Lady" – 3:15 (Are You Experienced)
8. "Burning of the Midnight Lamp" – 3:35 (Electric Ladyland)
9. "Highway Chile" – 3:30 (Smash Hits [UK])
10. "Crosstown Traffic" – 2:14 (Electric Ladyland)
11. "Castles Made of Sand" – 2:45 (Axis: Bold as Love, 1967)
12. "Long Hot Summer Night" – 3:27 (Electric Ladyland)
13. "Red House" – 3:54 (Kiss the Sky)
14. "Manic Depression" – 3:37 (Are You Experienced)
15. "Gypsy Eyes" – 3:42 (Electric Ladyland)
16. "Little Wing" – 2:24 (Axis: Bold as Love)
17. "Fire" – 2:38 (Are You Experienced)
18. "Wait Until Tomorrow" – 3:00 (Axis: Bold as Love)
19. "The Star-Spangled Banner (live)" (John Stafford Smith, arr. Hendrix) – 4:05 (Woodstock, 1970)
20. "Wild Thing (live)" (Chip Taylor) – 6:54 (Monterey Pop, 1970)

== Charts ==
=== Weekly charts ===
Chart (1992–1993)	Peak position
Australian Albums (ARIA)	7
Dutch Albums (Album Top 100)	70
German Albums (Offizielle Top 100)	61
New Zealand Albums (RMNZ)	1
Swedish Albums (Sverigetopplistan)	20
UK Albums (OCC)	25
US Billboard 200	72

=== Year-end charts ===
Chart (1993)	Position
Australian Albums (ARIA)	37
New Zealand Albums (RMNZ)	16

Chart (1994)	Position
Australian Albums (ARIA)	82

Chart (1995)	Position
Australian Albums (ARIA)	95

== Certifications ==
Region	Certification	Certified units/sales
Australia (ARIA)	2× Platinum	140,000^{^}
Canada (Music Canada)	2× Platinum	200,000^{^}
New Zealand (RMNZ)	Platinum	15,000^{^}
United Kingdom (BPI)	Gold	100,000^{^}
United States (RIAA)	3× Platinum	3,000,000^{^}
^{^} Shipments figures based on certification alone.

== Sources ==
- Shapiro, Harry; Glebbeek, Cesar (1991). Jimi Hendrix: Electric Gypsy. New York City: St. Martin's Press. ISBN 0-312-05861-6.
