= Burning Desire (disambiguation) =

Burning Desire is a posthumous Jimi Hendrix compilation album.

Burning Desire may also refer to:

== Music ==
- "Burning Desire" (song), a song by Lana Del Rey
- "Burning Desire", a song by Jimi Hendrix from The Baggy's Rehearsal Sessions
- Burning Desire, an album by MIKE

== Other ==
- Burning desire, a 1998 exhibit by artist Maurice Bennett
- Burning Desires, a play by Joan Schenkar at the Defiant Theatre
- Burning Desire, a video game released by Playaround
