= Miami Pop Festival =

Miami Pop Festival may refer to:

- Miami Pop Festival (May 1968)
- Miami Pop Festival (December 1968)
- Miami Pop Festival (album), an album by the Jimi Hendrix Experience
