= Live in Ottawa =

Live album by The Jimi Hendrix Experience
- Released: October 23, 2001
- Recorded: March 19, 1968
- Venue: Capitol Theatre, Ottawa, Canada
- Genre: Rock
- Length: 58:55
- Label: Dagger

The Jimi Hendrix Experience chronology
Voodoo Child: The Jimi Hendrix Collection (2001)	Live in Ottawa (2001)	The Baggy's Rehearsal Sessions (2002)

Live in Ottawa is a posthumous live album by the Jimi Hendrix Experience, released on October 23, 2001 by Dagger Records. The album documents the band's second performance at the Capitol Theatre in Ottawa, Ontario, Canada, on March 19, 1968. Three tracks from the first set were later issued in September 2008 on Live in Paris & Ottawa 1968.

== Track listing ==
All songs were written by Jimi Hendrix, except where noted.

No.	Title	Length
1.	"Killing Floor" (Howlin' Wolf)	6:07
2.	"Tax Free" (Bo Hansson, Janne Karlsson)	10:51
3.	"Fire"	3:38
4.	"Red House"	9:20
5.	"Foxey Lady"	5:32
6.	"Hey Joe" (Billy Roberts)	6:19
7.	"Spanish Castle Magic"	7:48
8.	"Purple Haze"	6:51
9.	"Wild Thing" (Chip Taylor)	2:29

== Personnel ==
- Jimi Hendrix – guitar, vocals
- Mitch Mitchell – drums
- Noel Redding – bass guitar, backing vocals
