= Live in Paris & Ottawa 1968 =

Live album by The Jimi Hendrix Experience
- Released: September 5, 2008
- Recorded: January 29, 1968; March 19, 1968
- Venue: L'Olympia, Paris; Capitol Theatre, Ottawa, Canada
- Genre: Rock
- Length: 62:12
- Label: Dagger

The Jimi Hendrix Experience chronology
Live at Monterey (2007)	Live in Paris & Ottawa 1968 (2008)	Live at Woburn (2009)

Live in Paris & Ottawa 1968 is a posthumous live album by the Jimi Hendrix Experience, released on September 5, 2008, by Dagger Records. The album contains songs from the band's performances at the L'Olympia Theatre in Paris on January 29, 1968, and the Capitol Theatre in Ottawa, Ontario, Canada, on March 19, 1968.

The concert in Paris had been issued as part of the 1991 box set Stages. The three songs from the concert in Ottawa are sourced from a previously undiscovered tape and were recorded during the first show of that evening. The second show at the Capitol Theatre in Ottawa had been issued in October 2001 as the album Live in Ottawa.

== Track listing ==
All tracks are written by Jimi Hendrix except where noted.

Live at the L'Olympia Theatre, Paris, January 29, 1968
No.	Title	Length
1.	"Killing Floor" (Chester Arthur Burnett a.k.a. Howlin' Wolf)	4:32
2.	"Catfish Blues" (Robert Petway)	8:46
3.	"Foxey Lady"	5:29
4.	"Red House"	4:24
5.	"Drivin' South"	9:24
6.	"The Wind Cries Mary"	3:55
7.	"Fire"	4:16
8.	"Little Wing"	3:40
9.	"Purple Haze"	5:59

Live at the Capitol Theatre, Ottawa, March 19, 1968
No.	Title	Length
10.	"Sgt. Pepper's Lonely Hearts Club Band" (Lennon-McCartney)	2:16
11.	"Fire"	3:29
12.	"Purple Haze"	5:15

== Personnel ==
- Jimi Hendrix – guitar, vocals
- Mitch Mitchell – drums
- Noel Redding – bass guitar; rhythm guitar on "Red House" (playing the bass strings, not lead guitar, as on the studio recording of "Red House")
