= Jimi Plays Monterey =

Live album by Jimi Hendrix
- Released: February 1986
- Recorded: June 18, 1967
- Venue: Monterey Pop Festival, Monterey, California
- Genre: Rock
- Length: 41:01
- Label: Reprise
- Producer: Alan Douglas

Jimi Hendrix chronology
Kiss the Sky (1984)	Jimi Plays Monterey (1986)	Johnny B. Goode (1986)

Jimi Plays Monterey is a posthumous live album by Jimi Hendrix released in February 1986. It documents the Jimi Hendrix Experience's performance at the Monterey Pop Festival on June 18, 1967. In 2007, it was superseded by Live at Monterey, produced under the auspices of the family-controlled Experience Hendrix.

Jimi Plays Monterey is also a film directed by D. A. Pennebaker and Chris Hegedus documenting the same performance as the album, also released in 1986. It is notable for containing several interviews with rock stars, and containing an art piece by Denny Dent during the performance of "Can You See Me", as the song was not filmed.

== Critical reception ==
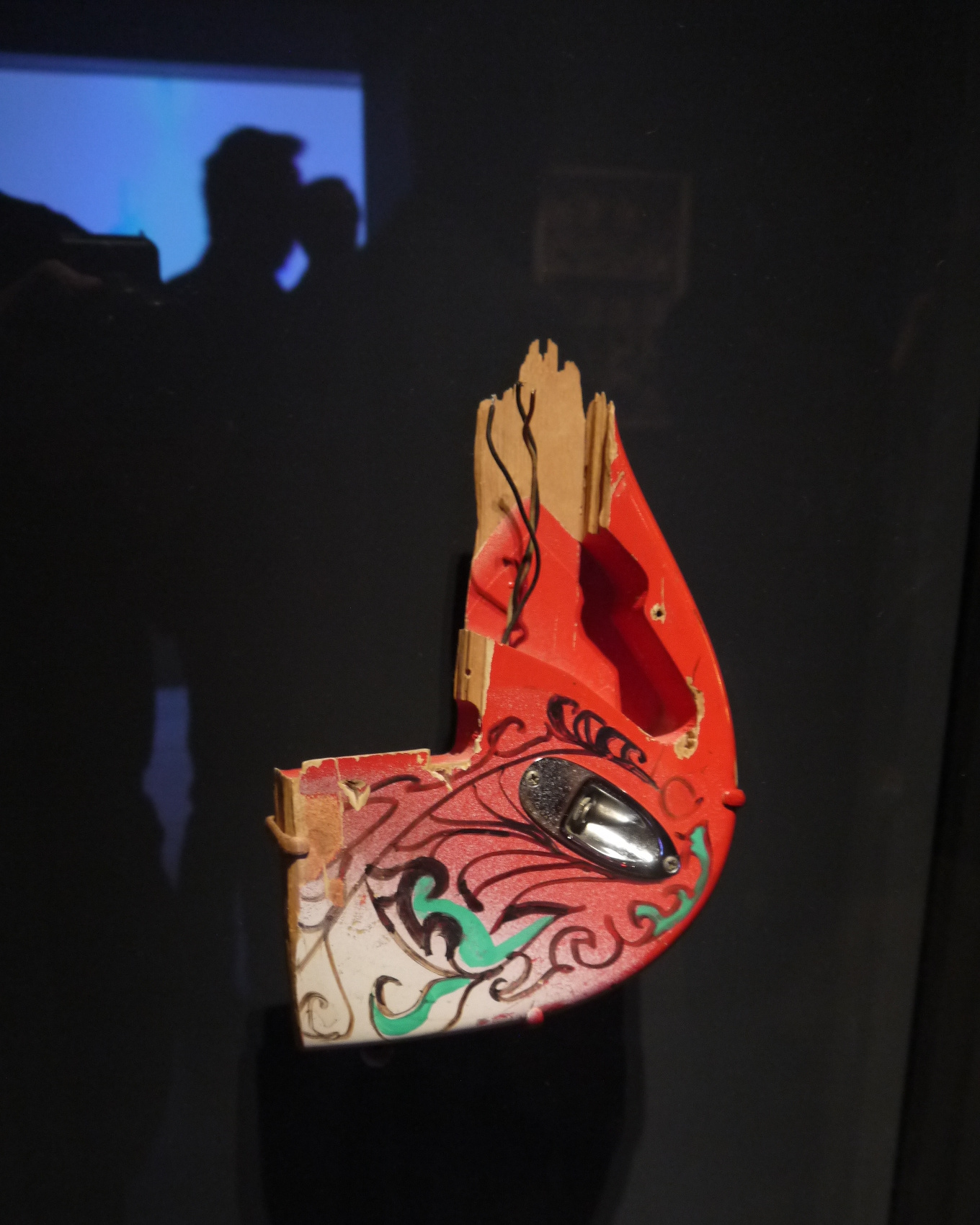
Remains of the guitar Hendrix set on fire during the show

Professional ratings
Review scores
Source	Rating
AllMusic	4.5/5 stars
Robert Christgau	B+
Encyclopedia of Popular Music	3/5 stars
The Rolling Stone Album Guide	3.5/5 stars
Tom Hull	A−

In Rolling Stone, David Fricke wrote Jimi Plays Monterey preserves Hendrix's wild playing and playful humor onstage, writing that the show it documents is "still a revelation, an orgasmic explosion of singing feedback, agitated stretches of jazzy improvisation and recombinant R&B guitar".

Robert Christgau called it "peace-and-love-and-egomania at its most far out" in The Village Voice, appreciating its digital mastering and historical value, although he lamented some of the performances themselves: "Jimi speeds alarmingly, Mitch Mitchell keeps tripping over his sticks, and 'Like a Rolling Stone' is patently hokey."

In a retrospective review for AllMusic, Richie Unterberger gave the album four-and-a-half out of five stars and felt the band was in "fine, lean, fiery form". Paul Evans gave it three-and-a-half stars in The Rolling Stone Album Guide (1992).

== Track listing ==
Details are taken from the original Reprise Records album release.

Side one
No.	Title	Writer(s)	Length
1.	"Killing Floor"	Howlin' Wolf	3:25
2.	"Foxy Lady"	Jimi Hendrix	3:34
3.	"Like a Rolling Stone"	Bob Dylan	6:51
4.	"Rock Me Baby"	B.B. King	3:29
5.	"Hey Joe"	Billy Roberts	4:10

Side two
No.	Title	Writer(s)	Length
1.	"Can You See Me"	Jimi Hendrix	2:42
2.	"The Wind Cries Mary"	Jimi Hendrix	3:24
3.	"Purple Haze"	Jimi Hendrix	3:18
4.	"Wild Thing"	Chip Taylor	9:10
