= Live at the Oakland Coliseum =

Live album by the Jimi Hendrix Experience
- Released: February 27, 1998
- Recorded: April 27, 1969
- Venue: Oakland Coliseum, Oakland, California
- Genre: Rock
- Length: 84:28
- Label: Dagger
- Producer: Janie Hendrix, John McDermott

The Jimi Hendrix Experience chronology
South Saturn Delta (1997)	Live at the Oakland Coliseum (1998)	BBC Sessions (1998)

Live at the Oakland Coliseum is a two-disc posthumous live album by the Jimi Hendrix Experience. It documents the group's performance at the Oakland Coliseum in Oakland, California, on April 27, 1969. The Experience broke up two months later, making the album one of the last full-length concert recordings of the trio to be officially issued.

Dagger Records released Live at the Oakland Coliseum on February 27, 1998. It was the first release on the label, which was set up by the Hendrix estate for recordings that "don't meet the technical recording criteria and sonic high standards" for standard releases.

== Songs ==
The Experience's performance at the Coliseum was not professionally recorded. However, a monophonic sound recording was made by fan Ken Koga. The set list for the concert was one typical of the 1969 tour, featuring staples "Fire", "Purple Haze" and "Spanish Castle Magic".

Other songs include the improvised "Hey Joe", blues numbers "Red House" and "Hear My Train A Comin'", the extended "Foxey Lady" and the finale of the night, an eighteen-minute jam on "Voodoo Child (Slight Return)", with Jefferson Airplane's Jack Casady on bass.

== Track listing ==
All songs were written by Jimi Hendrix, except where noted.

Disc one

1. "Introduction" – 0:42
2. "Fire" – 4:19
3. "Hey Joe" (Billy Roberts) – 4:26
4. "Spanish Castle Magic" – 8:53
5. "Hear My Train A Comin'" – 10:25
6. "Sunshine of Your Love" (Eric Clapton, Jack Bruce, Pete Brown) – 6:45
7. "Red House" – 13:12

Disc two

1. "Foxey Lady" – 10:36
2. "Star Spangled Banner" (Public domain) – 2:58
3. "Purple Haze" – 4:08
4. "Voodoo Child (Slight Return)" – 18:04

== Personnel ==
- Jimi Hendrix – guitar, vocals
- Mitch Mitchell – drums
- Noel Redding – bass guitar, backing vocals, rhythm guitar on "Voodoo Child"
- Jack Casady – bass on "Voodoo Child"
