= Woodstock (Jimi Hendrix album) =

Live album by Jimi Hendrix
- Released: August 20, 1994
- Recorded: August 18, 1969
- Venue: Woodstock Festival, Bethel, New York
- Genre: Rock
- Length: 63:46
- Label: MCA - Polydor
- Producer: Alan Douglas

Jimi Hendrix chronology
Blues (1994)	Woodstock (1994)	Voodoo Soup (1995)

Woodstock is a live album by Jimi Hendrix released posthumously on August 20, 1994. It presents some of Hendrix's performance at Woodstock Festival on August 18, 1969. The album was replaced by a more-complete version in 1999 titled Live at Woodstock, albeit with some of the performances edited.

== Critical reception ==
Professional ratings
Review scores
Source	Rating
AllMusic	3/5 stars
Blender	4/5 stars
New Musical Express	5/10
The Rolling Stone Album Guide	3.5/5 stars
The Village Voice	A−

In a contemporary review for The Village Voice, music critic Robert Christgau said the under-rehearsed, highly eccentric music on Woodstock makes for what was a transitional but all-important live album by Hendrix: "All in all, your basic rock concert as act of flawed genius. Does this kind of thing happen any more? Not on such a scale for sure."

Although Live at Woodstock (1999) was later released as a more comprehensive record of Hendrix's performance, Christgau felt the "condensed reconfiguration" offered by the 1994 album magnified the concert's "aura". AllMusic's Jason Anderson was less enthusiastic, deeming it "very significant" but not very well recorded, with fairly dull versions of "Fire" and "Purple Haze".

== Track listing ==
All tracks are written by Jimi Hendrix, except where noted.

No.	Title	Length
1.	"Introduction"	1:56
2.	"Fire"	3:53
3.	"Izabella"	5:10
4.	"Hear My Train A Comin' (Get My Heart Back Together Again)"	9:16
5.	"Red House"	5:40
6.	"Jam Back at the House (Beginnings)"	7:58
7.	"Voodoo Child (Slight Return)" / "Stepping Stone"	12:49
8.	"Star Spangled Banner" (Francis Scott Key, John Stafford Smith)	3:42
9.	"Purple Haze"	3:25
10.	"Woodstock Improvisation"	4:59
11.	"Villanova Junction"	3:04
12.	"Farewell"	1:54

== Personnel ==
- Jimi Hendrix – lead guitar, vocals
- Mitch Mitchell – drums
- Billy Cox – bass guitar
- Larry Lee – rhythm guitar
- Juma Sultan – percussion
- Jerry Velez – percussion
