= Miami Pop Festival (album) =

Live album by the Jimi Hendrix Experience
- Released: November 5, 2013
- Recorded: May 18, 1968
- Venue: Miami Pop Festival, Hallandale, Florida
- Genre: Rock
- Length: 60:50
- Label: Sony/Legacy
- Producer: Janie Hendrix, Eddie Kramer, John McDermott

Jimi Hendrix chronology
People, Hell and Angels (2013)	Miami Pop Festival (2013)	Freedom: Atlanta Pop Festival (2015)

Miami Pop Festival is a posthumous live album by the Jimi Hendrix Experience, documenting their May 18, 1968 performance at the Pop & Underground Festival in Hallandale, Florida. It features eight songs recorded during their evening performance, along with two extra songs.

The album was released on November 5, 2013, in conjunction with the Jimi Hendrix video documentary, Hear My Train A Comin'. "Fire" and "Foxey Lady", recorded during the afternoon-show, were also released as a stereo 45 rpm single. The album reached number 39 on the US Billboard 200 album chart and number 120 on the Belgian (Walloon) chart.

== Critical reception ==
Professional ratings
Review scores
Source	Rating
AllMusic	3.5/5 stars

In a review for AllMusic, Mark Demming gave the album three and a half out of five stars and writes "the recording is clean and full of detail ... and the Experience sound quite good ... but it doesn't cast much new light on his music or his performance style, making for a good but not a great live release."

== Track listing ==
All songs written by Jimi Hendrix, except where noted.

1. Introduction (no music) – 1:54
2. Hey Joe (Billy Roberts) – 6:22
3. Foxey Lady – 4:33
4. Tax Free (Bo Hansson, Janne Karlsson) – 8:20
5. Fire – 2:47
6. Hear My Train A Comin' – 7:58
7. I Don't Live Today – 4:50
8. Red House – 12:07
9. Purple Haze – 4:19
10. Fire (afternoon show) – 3:07
11. Foxey Lady (afternoon show) – 4:56

== Personnel ==
- Jimi Hendrix – vocals, guitar
- Noel Redding – bass guitar, backing vocals
- Mitch Mitchell – drums
