= Live at Woburn =

Live album by The Jimi Hendrix Experience
- Released: July 28, 2009
- Recorded: July 6, 1968
- Venue: Woburn Music Festival, England
- Genre: Rock
- Length: 48:01
- Label: Dagger

The Jimi Hendrix Experience chronology
Live in Paris & Ottawa 1968 (2008)	Live at Woburn (2009)	Valleys of Neptune (2010)

Live at Woburn is a posthumous live album by the Jimi Hendrix Experience, released on July 28, 2009, by Dagger Records. The concert was captured from a recording made from the stage soundboard on July 6, 1968, at the Woburn Music Festival in Woburn, Bedfordshire, England.

== Track listing ==
All songs were written by Jimi Hendrix, except where noted.

1. "Introduction" – 1:07
2. "Sgt. Pepper's Lonely Hearts Club Band" (John Lennon, Paul McCartney) – 1:11
3. "Fire" – 4:19
4. "Tax Free" (Bo Hansson, Jan Carlsson) – 10:11
5. "Red House" – 11:30
6. "Foxy Lady" – 4:55
7. "Voodoo Child (Slight Return)" – 6:38
8. "Purple Haze" – 8:10

== Personnel ==
- Jimi Hendrix – guitar, vocals
- Mitch Mitchell – drums
- Noel Redding – bass guitar

== Reception ==
Professional ratings
Review scores
Source	Rating
Allmusic	3/5 stars
Rolling Stone	3.5/5 stars

If the fucked-amp squeal that constantly disrupts this show annoys you, imagine how pissed off Hendrix was. But this raw '68 soundboard tape is notable for a vicious live debut of "Voodoo Child (Slight Return)" and a long free-rock intro to "Purple Haze," with Hendrix wrenching howling fury from his guitar over an improvised bass-drums riot.

— David Fricke, Rolling Stone Magazine
