= Paris 1967/San Francisco 1968 =

Live album by Jimi Hendrix Experience
- Released: April 24, 2003
- Recorded: October 9, 1967; February 4, 1968
- Venue: L'Olympia, Paris; Fillmore Auditorim, San Francisco, California
- Genre: Rock
- Length: 75:00
- Label: Dagger

Jimi Hendrix Experience chronology
Blue Wild Angel: Live at the Isle of Wight (2002)	Paris 1967/San Francisco 1968 (2003)	Martin Scorsese Presents the Blues: Jimi Hendrix (2003)

Paris 1967/San Francisco 1968 is a posthumous live album by the Jimi Hendrix Experience, released on April 24, 2003, by Dagger Records. The album contains songs from the group's performances at the L' Olympia Theatre in Paris on October 9, 1967, and the Fillmore Auditorium in San Francisco, California, on February 4, 1968. In 2021, an expanded edition focusing on the Paris performance was released by Dagger.

== Track listing ==
All tracks are written by Jimi Hendrix except where noted.

Live at the L'Olympia Theatre, Paris, October 9, 1967
No.	Title	Length
1.	"Stone Free"	3:40
2.	"Hey Joe" (Billy Roberts)	4:22
3.	"Fire"	3:29
4.	"Rock Me Baby" (B.B. King)	5:03
5.	"Red House"	7:49
6.	"Purple Haze"	7:26
7.	"Wild Thing" (Chip Taylor)	5:56

Live at the Fillmore Auditorium, San Francisco, California, February 4, 1968
No.	Title	Length
8.	"Killing Floor" (Chester Arthur Burnett a.k.a. Howlin' Wolf)	4:05
9.	"Red House"	5:42
10.	"Catfish Blues" (Robert Petway)	11:43
11.	"Dear Mr. Fantasy (Part 1)" (Jim Capaldi, Steve Winwood, Chris Wood)	5:10
12.	"Dear Mr. Fantasy (Part 2)" (Capaldi, Winwood, Wood)	7:34
13.	"Purple Haze"	5:00

== 2021 expanded edition ==
For Record Store Day November 26, 2021, Dagger released an expanded edition titled Paris 1967. In addition to the tracks recorded in Paris from the original, it includes an additional two songs that were released on the 2000 box set The Jimi Hendrix Experience: "Catfish Blues" (based on Muddy Waters' "Rollin' Stone"/"Still a Fool") and the blues standard "Rock Me Baby".

In a review for AllMusic, Fred Thomas gave the album four out of five stars. He commented on several of the album's songs and concluded, "The rudimentary two-track stereo recording is raw, but it matches the band's energy in what amounts to a definitive example of how the Experience were operating on-stage as they skyrocketed to fame." The expanded edition reached number 117 on the Billboard 200 album chart.

== Personnel ==
- Jimi Hendrix – guitar, vocals
- Mitch Mitchell – drums
- Noel Redding – bass guitar
- Buddy Miles – drums on "Dear Mr. Fantasy Part 1 & 2"
