= Live at Woodstock (Jimi Hendrix album) =

Live album by Jimi Hendrix
- Released: July 6, 1999
- Recorded: August 18, 1969
- Venue: Woodstock Festival, Bethel, New York
- Genre: Rock
- Length: 96:38
- Label: MCA
- Producer: Janie Hendrix, Eddie Kramer, John McDermott

Jimi Hendrix chronology
Live at the Fillmore East (1999)	Live at Woodstock (1999)	Live at Clark University (1999)

Professional ratings
Review scores
Source	Rating
AllMusic	3/5 stars
Rolling Stone	3/5 stars
Tom Hull – on the Web	B+

Live at Woodstock is a posthumous live album by Jimi Hendrix released on July 6, 1999. It documents most of his performance at the Woodstock Festival on August 18, 1969, and contains Hendrix's iconic interpretation of "The Star-Spangled Banner" and other songs from the original festival film and soundtrack album.

== Background and recording ==
Woodstock was Hendrix's first public performance since the breakup of the Jimi Hendrix Experience on June 29, 1969. At Woodstock, he was accompanied by an expanded lineup of backing musicians. The short-lived group has been informally referred to as "Gypsy Sun and Rainbows", after a comment Hendrix made during the performance:

Dig, we'd like to get something straight. We got tired of the Experience ... So we decided to change the whole thing around, and call it Gypsy Sun and Rainbows. Or short, it's nothin' but a Band of Gypsys.

Hendrix's set began at 9 a.m. and lasted for about two hours; he played to a dwindling Monday morning audience. The set closed the festival.

== Releases and omissions ==
The album, produced by the family-run Experience Hendrix, supersedes the 1994 Woodstock album produced by Alan Douglas, which contains fewer and more edited tracks. As with the earlier release, the medley of "Gypsy Woman" with "Aware of Love" (both songs originally by the Impressions) and rhythm guitarist Larry Lee's composition "Mastermind" are not included. Lee's solo on "Red House" and Mitch Mitchell's drum solo on "Jam Back at the House" have been edited. A two-disc DVD version of the performance was issued on September 13, 2005, and a single-disc Blu-ray version was issued on November 25, 2008.

== Track listing ==
All songs were written by Jimi Hendrix, except where noted. Details are taken from the original Live at Woodstock MCA Records CD liner notes. Other releases may show different information.

Disc one
No.	Title	Length
1.	"Introduction" (spoken, no music)	2:21
2.	"Message to Love"	7:21
3.	"Hear My Train A Comin'"	9:49
4.	"Spanish Castle Magic"	7:05
5.	"Red House"	5:24
6.	"Lover Man"	5:11
7.	"Foxy Lady"	5:06
8.	"Jam Back at the House"	7:44

Disc two
No.	Title	Length
1.	"Izabella"	6:42
2.	"Fire"	3:42
3.	"Voodoo Child (Slight Return)"	13:40
4.	"Star Spangled Banner" (Francis Scott Key, John Stafford Smith; adapted by Hendrix)	3:43
5.	"Purple Haze"	4:23
6.	"Woodstock Improvisation"	3:59
7.	"Villanova Junction" (Originally titled "Instrumental Solo" on Woodstock: Music from the Original Soundtrack and More)	4:28
8.	"Hey Joe" (Billy Roberts)	5:52

== Personnel ==
- Jimi Hendrix – lead guitar, vocals
- Mitch Mitchell – drums
- Billy Cox – bass guitar
- Larry Lee – rhythm guitar, first guitar solo on "Lover Man"
- Juma Sultan – percussion
- Jerry Velez – percussion
