= Live at Monterey =

Live album by the Jimi Hendrix Experience
- Released: October 16, 2007
- Recorded: June 18, 1967
- Venue: Monterey Pop Festival, California
- Genre: Rock
- Length: 43:08
- Label: Geffen, UMe
- Producer: Janie Hendrix, Eddie Kramer, John McDermott

Jimi Hendrix chronology
Burning Desire (2006)	Live at Monterey (2007)	Live in Paris & Ottawa 1968 (2008)

Live at Monterey is an album that contains the performance by the Jimi Hendrix Experience recorded at the Monterey Pop Festival on June 18, 1967. Released on October 16, 2007, it is the third Hendrix album of recordings from Monterey, following Historic Performances Recorded at the Monterey International Pop Festival (1970) and Jimi Plays Monterey (1986).

Professional ratings
Review scores
Source	Rating
AllMusic	4.5/5 stars
Tom Hull – on the Web	A−
Uncut	4/5 stars

== Track listing ==
No.	Title	Writer(s)	Length
1.	"Introduction by Brian Jones"		0:39
2.	"Killing Floor"	Chester Burnett	3:14
3.	"Foxy Lady"	Jimi Hendrix	3:28
4.	"Like a Rolling Stone"	Bob Dylan	7:07
5.	"Rock Me Baby"	B. B. King, Joe Josea	3:37
6.	"Hey Joe"	Billy Roberts	5:11
7.	"Can You See Me"	Hendrix	2:37
8.	"The Wind Cries Mary"	Hendrix	3:53
9.	"Purple Haze"	Hendrix	5:34
10.	"Wild Thing"	Chip Taylor	7:49
Total length:			43:09

DVD edition bonus tracks (live in Chelmsford, February 25, 1967)
No.	Title	Writer(s)	Length
11.	"Stone Free"	Jimi Hendrix	3:41
12.	"Like a Rolling Stone"	Bob Dylan	3:50
13.	"Music Love And Flowers: The Monterey International Pop Festival (documentary)"	Lou Adler	7:42
14.	"American Landing (documentary)"		23:12

== See also ==
- Historic Performances Recorded at the Monterey International Pop Festival
- Jimi Plays Monterey
