= Live at Clark University =

Live album by The Jimi Hendrix Experience
- Released: July 6, 1999
- Recorded: March 15, 1968
- Venue: Clark University, Worcester, Massachusetts
- Genre: Rock
- Length: 69:31
- Label: Dagger

The Jimi Hendrix Experience chronology
Live at Woodstock (1999)	Live at Clark University (1999)	Morning Symphony Ideas (2000)

Live at Clark University is a posthumous live album by the Jimi Hendrix Experience, released on July 6, 1999, by Dagger Records. The album documents the band's performance at Clark University in Worcester, Massachusetts on March 15, 1968. "Fire", "Red House" and "Foxey Lady", as well as the two interviews with Jimi Hendrix, were featured on the companion CD to the book Jimi Hendrix: An Illustrated Experience (2007). The album was re-released - minus the interviews - on vinyl in 2010 as part of Record Store Day.

== The concert ==
The performance at the university was part of the band's extensive American tour in support of Axis: Bold As Love. The Experience played in the Atwood Hall, which could accommodate more than six hundred students. Tickets for the concerts, which sold out, were modestly priced, with seats priced at $3.00, $3.50, and $4.00. Hendrix was interviewed before his band's set, a recording of which is featured on the album. The album opens with "Fire", though it is unknown if other tracks preceded it. The show was professionally recorded, and post-concert interviews with bassist Noel Redding, drummer Mitch Mitchell and Hendrix are also included.

The photograph on the album cover was taken by Robert Marshall, who was the staff photographer for the Clark Scarlet, the Clark University student newspaper.

== Track listing ==
All songs were written by Jimi Hendrix, except where noted.

No.	Title	Length
1.	"Jimi Hendrix: pre-concert interview"	20:56
2.	"Fire"	3:33
3.	"Red House"	7:09
4.	"Foxey Lady"	4:31
5.	"Purple Haze"	5:05
6.	"Wild Thing" (Chip Taylor)	8:12
7.	"Noel Redding: post-concert interview"	7:13
8.	"Mitch Mitchell: post-concert interview"	8:58
9.	"Hendrix: post-concert interview"	4:54

== Personnel ==
- Jimi Hendrix – guitar, lead vocals
- Mitch Mitchell – drums
- Noel Redding – bass guitar, backing vocals
