= Johnny B. Goode (album) =

Album by Jimi Hendrix

Johnny B. Goode: An Original Video Soundtrack

Live album by Jimi Hendrix
- Released: June 1986
- Recorded: May 30; July 4, 1970
- Venue: Berkeley Community Theater, Berkeley, California; Atlanta Pop Festival, Byron, Georgia
- Genre: Rock
- Length: 26:08
- Label: Capitol (US); Fame (UK)
- Producer: Alan Douglas; Chip Branton

Hendrix US albums chronology
Jimi Plays Monterey (1986)	Johnny B. Goode: An Original Video Soundtrack (1986)	Band of Gypsys 2 (1986)

Hendrix UK albums chronology
The Jimi Hendrix Concerts (1982)	Johnny B. Goode (1986)	Radio One (1988)

Johnny B. Goode is a live album by Jimi Hendrix, released posthumously in June 1986. It contains three songs from Hendrix's performance at the 1970 Atlanta International Pop Festival on July 4, 1970, and two songs, including the title track, from a performance at the Berkeley Community Theater on May 30, 1970.

Marketed as a "mini LP" soundtrack, it was released at the same time as a video album with the same title, but with more performances from Atlanta Pop. More complete performances from both concerts were released on Live at Berkeley (2003) and Freedom: Atlanta Pop Festival (2015) (see Jimi Hendrix videography for more information about video releases).

== Critical reception ==
In The Village Voice, Robert Christgau gave Johnny B. Goode an "A−" and called it "vivid testimony to the uses of digital mastering for archival music", finding the sound particularly "powerful" on side one. He highlighted the "intense" rendition of "All Along the Watchtower" and "Johnny B. Goode", writing that Hendrix's performance of the latter song is "the definitive version of the definitive guitar anthem". Paul Evans gave it three-and-a-half stars in The Rolling Stone Album Guide (1992).

== Track listing ==
All tracks written by Jimi Hendrix, except where noted.

Side one
No.	Title	Recording date and location	Length
1.	"Voodoo Child (Slight Return) (edit)"	July 4, 1970, Atlanta International Pop Festival	4:30
2.	"Johnny B. Goode" (Chuck Berry)	May 30, 1970, Berkeley Community Theater (1st Show)	3:55
3.	"All Along the Watchtower" (Bob Dylan)	July 4, 1970, Atlanta International Pop Festival	3:57

Side two
No.	Title	Recording date and location	Length
4.	"The Star Spangled Banner" (John Stafford Smith, Francis Scott Key, arranged by Hendrix)	July 4, 1970, Atlanta International Pop Festival	2:46
5.	"Machine Gun"	May 30, 1970, Berkeley Community Theater (2nd Show)	11:00

== Personnel ==
- Jimi Hendrix – guitar, vocals
- Mitch Mitchell – drums
- Billy Cox – bass guitar
