= Hear My Music =

Compilation album by Jimi Hendrix
- Released: November 30, 2004
- Recorded: February–April 1969
- Length: 70:06
- Label: Dagger

Jimi Hendrix chronology
The Singles Collection (2003)	Hear My Music (2004)	Live at the Isle of Fehmarn (2005)

Hear My Music is a posthumous compilation album by Jimi Hendrix, released on November 30, 2004, by Dagger Records. The album contains instrumental studio jams and demos recorded in early 1969.

== Track listing ==
All songs were written by Jimi Hendrix, except where noted.

No.	Title	Recording date and location	Length
1.	"Slow Version"	February 14, 1969, Olympic Studios	4:56
2.	"Drone Blues"	April 24, 1969, Record Plant Studios	8:29
3.	"Ezy Ryder/Star Spangled Banner" (Hendrix/Francis Scott Key, John Stafford Smith)	February 14, 1969, Olympic Studios	10:17
4.	"Jimi/Jimmy Jam"	March 25, 1969, Record Plant Studios	16:59
5.	"Jam 292"	May 14, 1969, Record Plant Studios	5:22
6.	"Trash Man"	April 3, 1969, Olmstead Studios	7:23
7.	"Message to Love"	February 22, 1969, Olympic Studios	2:36
8.	"Gypsy Blood"	February 22, 1969, Olympic Studios	1:24
9.	"Valleys of Neptune (Guitar)"	February 22, 1969, Olympic Studios	3:59
10.	"Blues Jam at Olympic"	February 14, 1969, Olympic Studios	5:10
11.	"Valleys of Neptune (Piano)"	February 22, 1969, Olympic Studios	3:05

== Personnel ==
- Jimi Hendrix – guitar, piano on track 11
- Noel Redding – bass on tracks 1, 3 and 10, 8-string bass on track 6
- Mitch Mitchell – drums on tracks 1, 3-6 and 10
- Billy Cox – bass on tracks 2 and 5
- Rocky Isaac – drums on track 2
- Al Marks – percussion on track 2
- Roland Robinson – bass on track 4
- Jim McCarty – guitar on track 4
- Sharon Layne – piano on track 5
