= Red House (song) =

Song first recorded by the Jimi Hendrix Experience in 1966

Song by the Jimi Hendrix Experience

from the album Are You Experienced
- Released: May 12, 1967
- Recorded: December 13, 1966
- Studio: CBS, London
- Genre: Blues
- Length: 3:45
- Label: Track
- Songwriter: Jimi Hendrix
- Producer: Chas Chandler

"Red House" is a song written by Jimi Hendrix and one of the first songs recorded in 1966 by the Jimi Hendrix Experience. It has the musical form of a conventional twelve-bar blues and features Hendrix's guitar playing. He developed the song prior to forming the Experience and was inspired by earlier blues songs.

"Red House" was first released on the British edition of Hendrix's debut album Are You Experienced in May 1967 (for the American album release, previously released Experience singles were used in its place). A second similar take was eventually released in the US in July 1969 on the American Smash Hits compilation.

The song was a fixture of Hendrix concerts throughout his career. Although the lyrics and basic structure were followed, his performances usually varied from the original recording. Many were recorded and continue to be released officially for the first time, including on Freedom: Atlanta Pop Festival (2015) and Live in Maui (2020). "Red House" has also been performed and recorded by a variety of blues and other artists.

== Background ==
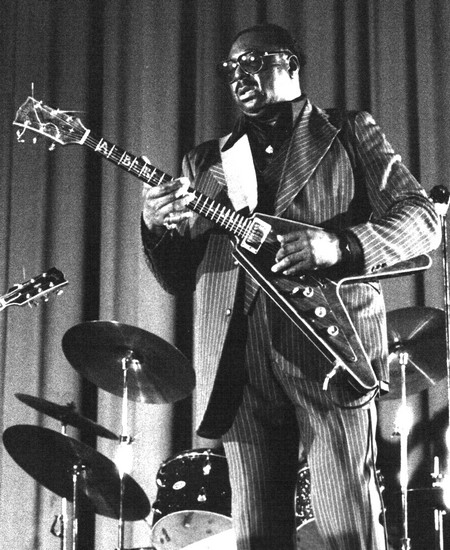
Albert King in Paris, 1978

"Red House" was inspired by blues songs Hendrix was performing early in his career as a sideman. Music critic Charles Shaar Murray describes a song he calls "California Night", which Hendrix performed with Curtis Knight and the Squires, as "a dead ringer, both in structure and mood, for his 1967 perennial 'Red House'". Originally recorded by Albert King in 1961 as "Travelin' to California", it is a slow blues with lyrics that follow the common blues theme of the rambling man and his lost love (sometimes also misidentified as "Every Day I Have the Blues" – both songs use the verse "nobody loves me"). (Note: Albert King's "Travelin' to California" was issued as a single in 1961 (King 5588) and included on his album The Big Blues (1962); he also recorded it for Chess Records in 1961 – it was released with the title "California" or "California Blues" on the Door to Door (1969) compilation album (Chess LP-1538).) Elmore James's 1960 song "The Sky Is Crying" contains "I got a bad feeling my baby don't love me no more" and has been suggested as inspiring the similar line used by Hendrix.

Hendrix recorded two live versions of "Travelin' to California" with Knight, which prominently feature his vocal and guitar playing. Both were recorded at George's Club 20 in Hackensack, New Jersey, on December 26, 1965 and/or January 22, 1966. After Hendrix's death in 1970, the recordings (using various names) were released by several European record companies that specialized in bootleg and grey-market albums. In 2017, a version was officially released on Curtis Knight [Featuring Jimi Hendrix]: Live at George's Club 20.

Music writer Keith Shadwick describes Hendrix's performance as "a staggering display of blues guitar playing that is worthy of mention in the same breath as his later efforts with the Experience". Although Shadwick compares his guitar tone and phraseology to that of Buddy Guy, he adds that his techniques "simply transcend any previous models, and breaks new ground" and shows that "his ability to spin out long and consistently surprising lines across the standard blues changes is already full grown". In 1966, during his residency as Jimmy James and the Blue Flames at the Cafe Wha? in New York City's Greenwich Village, Hendrix continued to develop his slow blues number that became "Red House".

== Composition and lyrics ==
"Red House" is a moderately slow blues, which music writers Tom Wheeler and Joe Gore describe as having "the twelve-bar structure, the lyrics, the accompaniment, and the arrangement [that] are more or less conventional". The song is notated in 12/8 time in the key of B major with a tempo of 66 beats per minute (although Hendrix fingered the song in the key of B major, he usually tuned his guitar one-half step and sometimes one step lower, resulting in a lower pitch). The song opens with a diminished seventh chord frequently found in blues songs, including the intros to the Robert Johnson songs "Dead Shrimp Blues", "Kind Hearted Woman", and "32-20 Blues". After the four-bar intro, Redding and Experience drummer Mitch Mitchell come in while Hendrix solos up to the vocal at bar thirteen. After two twelve-bar vocal sections, Hendrix solos for twelve bars, then finishes up with another vocal section. The song's most prominent characteristic is Hendrix's guitar work. Author Jeffrey Carroll describes his solo as "concise and packed solid with vocalisms, the bending and glissandos, jumps, drops and whoops of his guitar kept within a traditional structure of a break". Shadwick also compares it to a vocal, calling it a "close approximation of the human voice ... scooping and bending his phrases to maximum expressive effect". American bluesman John Lee Hooker commented, "That 'Red House', that'll make you grab your mother and choke her! Man, that's really hard, that tears you apart. He could get down, he could mash it, yeah, Lord! He had so many blues".

In his biography Room Full of Mirrors, biographer Charles R. Cross comments that the song's theme is "as old as the blues itself; the singer's woman doesn't love him any more and has moved". Author Kay Norton describes the broader blues influence as "balancing a celebration of love and sex with dark humor and wry commentary on loss, mistreatment, corruption, and poverty". The lyrics follow a blues call and response or AAB pattern, where the first line (A) is repeated (often with a slight variation), followed by the response (B):

Wait a minute something's wrong here, the key won't unlock this door
Wait a minute something's wrong, Lord have mercy this key won't unlock this door
(Something's goin' on here)
I have a bad, bad feeling, that my baby don't live here no more ...

Well I might as well go back over yonder, way back among the hills
(Yeah that's what I'm gonna do)
Lord I might as well go back over yonder, way back yonder across the hills
'Cause if my baby don't love me no more, I know her sister will
(Yeah, how's that?)

According to Experience bassist Noel Redding, Hendrix told him it was about Hendrix's girlfriend in high school, Betty Jean Morgan. Jimi's brother, Leon Hendrix, also felt that it was about Betty Jean, but also included her sister Maddy, although their house was brown. Shadwick suggests that the song was inspired by Linda Keith, Keith Richards' then-girlfriend and early Hendrix supporter. Keith referred to her friend's Manhattan apartment, with its red velvet walls and decor, as the "red house", and the two frequently stayed there during the summer of 1966. In London in 1970, Hendrix met up with Keith and when he performed "Red House" at the 1970 Isle of Wight Festival, he dedicated the song to her and added "I got to get out of here, because my Linda don't live here no more" to the lyrics. However, Billy Cox, longtime friend and bassist for Hendrix' post-Experience groups, explained, "As far as I know, 'Red House' didn't have any significance in reference to a particular person, place, or thing. It was just a blues number that Jimi put together".

== Recording ==
"Red House" was one of the earliest songs recorded by the Experience. The group first attempted it at the CBS Studios in London on Tuesday, December 13, 1966, following their performance of "Hey Joe" for the Ready Steady Go! music television program. Basic tracks for several songs were recorded during the three-hour session. Producer Chas Chandler recalled: "The 'Red House' on the album [Are You Experienced] came about during the last fifteen minutes of [the December 13] session. Noel even played rhythm guitar on the track, playing the bass line. Jimi just winged through one take for reference and we started rolling".

Redding added, "I had borrowed a terrible old hollow-body electric guitar from someone at the studio ... because I liked to play along on rhythm to familiarise myself with a sequence, not being quite at home on the bass yet". The guitar was tuned down one-half step, with the tone controls set to resemble a bass guitar.

Additional takes of the song were recorded at De Lane Lea Studios on December 21, 1966, which closely followed the earlier arrangement. However, both Hendrix and Redding had problems with missed notes and the takes were not used, except for a backing track that Hendrix later overdubbed at the Olympic Studios on March 29 or early April 1967.

== Releases ==
When preparing the final mixes for the Experience's debut album, Chandler chose to use the December 13, 1966, track recorded at CBS: "Later when we were scrambling to put the album together, we carted that [December 13 track] out and gave it a listen. We remixed it at Olympic and added it to the album". Track Records issued the monaural mix on Are You Experienced, which was released on May 12, 1967, in the UK. At the time, it was industry practice in the US to include singles on albums. So when the album was released in the US, "Purple Haze", "Hey Joe" and "The Wind Cries Mary" were included at the expense of "Red House" and two other songs. Hendrix later questioned the choice and commented "Everybody was scared to release 'Red House' in America because they said, 'America don't like the blues, man!'"

"Red House" finally saw an American release on July 30, 1969. Reprise Records issued a stereo mix of the version recorded at De Lane Lea/Olympic on the Smash Hits compilation. This version was later released internationally on the 1984 Kiss the Sky compilation. The original mono take became available in the US and Canada when it was released (without most of the studio talk at the end) on the 1994 Blues album.

== Other recordings ==
Although Hendrix seeks to follow roughly the same musical roadmap in each performance, visiting many of the same locations, he never takes the same route twice.

— Tom Wheeler & Joe Gore, Variations on a Theme: Red House (1992)

"Red House" was a staple of Jimi Hendrix's concerts and jam sessions and often his performances showed considerable variety. Some later renditions show B.B. King influences as well as the use of T-Bone Walker-style ninth chords and Curtis Mayfield rhythm stylings. Also, it was one of few songs that Hendrix sometimes used a guitar other than a Fender Stratocaster, choosing mostly a Gibson Flying V and occasionally a Gibson SG Custom. Redding normally accompanied him on his signature Fender Jazz bass, instead of a guitar; Cox also used a bass.

Variations on a Theme: Red House (1992), a music reference with analyses, transcriptions, and accompanying compact disc, explores several live versions. Several more performances have been released on various live and compilation albums over the years. Generally, these later performances were much longer (on Variations they range from seven to fourteen minutes) than the original recording and slower (36 to 60 bpm with shifts in tempo, on Variations). Some of these later versions by the Experience and Hendrix's later lineups include (all live, except two studio performances): (Note: "Red House" appears on several earlier album editions that are now out of print – the albums listed are limited to those currently available.)

- October 9, 1967, at the Olympia Theatre in Paris (Paris 1967/San Francisco 1968)
- January 29, 1968, also at the Olympia (Live in Paris & Ottawa 1968); for the performance, Redding revisited the original by playing the bass part on guitar (a Gibson Les Paul Custom, borrowed last minute from Keith Richards) (Note: In Paris in 1968, Hendrix introduced the song as featuring Redding on guitar, although his part is limited to the bass accompaniment.)
- February 4, 1968, at the Fillmore Auditorium in San Francisco (Paris 1967/San Francisco 1968)
- March 1968, at a jam at the Scene club in New York City (Woke Up This Morning and Found Myself Dead); unlike his other versions, Hendrix used a guitar figure similar to Cream's "Crossroads" (Note: Although Cream's "Crossroads" was not officially released until Wheels of Fire in August 1968, they had been playing it since 1966.)
- March 15, 1968, at Clark University, in Worcester, Massachusetts (Live at Clark University)
- March 19, 1968, at the Capitol Theatre in Ottawa, Canada (Live in Ottawa)
- May 18, 1968, at the Miami Pop Festival (Miami Pop Festival)
- October 10, 11, and 12, 1968, (three versions) at the Winterland Ballroom in San Francisco (Winterland)
- October 29, 1968, at TTG Studios in Hollywood (Blues), this version was performed in the style of "Voodoo Chile" with organist Lee Michaels (Note: The 1968 TTG Studios version on Blues is actually a composite of two songs, with an earlier recorded TTG jam named "Electric Church" serving as the intro (Variations on a Theme includes an extra 1:15 of the intro jam).)
- February 17, 1969, at Olympic Studios in London (Valleys of Neptune); it was recorded during a rehearsal for the upcoming Experience concerts at the Royal Albert Hall.
- April 26, 1969, at the Forum in Inglewood, California (Los Angeles Forum: April 26, 1969)
- April 27, 1969, at the Oakland Coliseum (Live at the Oakland Coliseum)
- May 24, 1969, at the San Diego Sports Arena (Hendrix in the West and The Jimi Hendrix Experience box set)
- August 18, 1969, at Woodstock (Live at Woodstock); (Note: At Woodstock, Hendrix played much of the song with a broken string.) it did not appear in the 1970 Woodstock film or the Woodstock: Music from the Original Soundtrack and More album
- May 30, 1970, at the Berkeley Community Theater (West Coast Seattle Boy: The Jimi Hendrix Anthology)
- July 30, 1970, in upcountry Maui, Hawaii, during filming for Rainbow Bridge (Live in Maui)
- July 4, 1970, at the Atlanta International Pop Festival (1970) (Freedom: Atlanta Pop Festival)
- July 17, 1970, at the New York Pop Festival at Downing Stadium, Randall's Island, New York City (Voodoo Child: The Jimi Hendrix Collection)
- August 30, 1970, at the Isle of Wight Festival 1970 (Blue Wild Angel: Live at the Isle of Wight)
- September 6, 1970, at the Open Air Love & Peace Festival in Fehmarn, Germany (Live at the Isle of Fehmarn)

== Renditions by other artists ==
"Red House" has been performed by many blues and other musicians. Albert King, whose "Travelin' to California" inspired Hendrix, recorded a version for his final studio album, Red House (1991). Another Hendrix influence, Buddy Guy, recorded it for Stone Free: A Tribute to Jimi Hendrix. Murray describes two versions by John Lee Hooker: a "more or less straight" version recorded in 1989 that appears on Variations on a Theme (1992) and later a "radically Hookerized and thoroughly deconstructed version" for the Van Morrison-produced Don't Look Back (1997). Prince reworked it as "Purple House" for the 2004 tribute Power of Soul: A Tribute to Jimi Hendrix, which also included Hooker's 1997 version of the song. In an AllMusic review, critic Sean Westergaard comments: "Prince reinterprets 'Red House' with great gospel-esque backing vocals and a monstrous guitar solo."

== Notes ==
Footnotes

== Citations ==
References

- Belmo; Loveless, Steve (1998). Jimi Hendrix: Experience the Music. Burlington, Ontario: Collector's Guide Publishing. ISBN 1-896522-45-9.
- Black, Johnny (1999). Jimi Hendrix: The Ultimate Experience. New York City: Thunder's Mouth Press. ISBN 1-56025-240-5.
- Carroll, Jeffrey (2005). When Your Way Gets Dark: A Rhetoric of the Blues. West Lafayette, Indiana: Parlor Press. ISBN 978-1932559385.
- Cross, Charles R. (2005). Room Full of Mirrors: A Biography of Jimi Hendrix (1st. Trade Paperback ed.). New York City: Hyperion Books. ISBN 0-7868-8841-5.
- Fairchild, Michael J. (1994). Jimi Hendrix: Blues (CD booklet). Jimi Hendrix. New York City: MCA Records. MCAD-11060.
- Hal Leonard (1998). Experience Hendrix: The Best of Jimi Hendrix Transcribed Scores. Milwaukee, Wisconsin: Hal Leonard. ISBN 978-0-7935-9144-2.
- Heatley, Michael (2009). Jimi Hendrix Gear. Minneapolis, Minnesota: Voyageur Press. ISBN 978-1610604215.
- Hendrix, Janie (2003). Jimi Hendrix: The Lyrics. Milwaukee, Wisconsin: Hal Leonard. ISBN 0-634-04930-5.
- Loder, Kurt (2001). Voodoo Child: The Jimi Hendrix Collection (Album notes). Jimi Hendrix. Santa Monica, California: MCA Records. 088 112 603-2.
- McDermott, John; Kramer, Eddie; Cox, Billy (2009). Ultimate Hendrix. New York City: Backbeat Books. ISBN 978-0-87930-938-1.
- McDermott, John (2010a). Valleys of Neptune (CD booklet). Jimi Hendrix. New York City: Legacy Records. 88697 64056 2.
- McDermott, John (2010b). West Coast Seattle Boy: The Jimi Hendrix Anthology (CD set booklet). Jimi Hendrix. New York City: Legacy. 88697769272.
- McDermott, John (2017). Live at George's Club 20 (Album notes). Curtis Knight [Featuring Jimi Hendrix]. New York City: Dagger Records. OCLC 992175290. 88985410162.
- Murray, Charles Shaar (1991). Crosstown Traffic. New York City: St. Martin's Press. ISBN 0-312-06324-5.
- Murray, Charles Shaar (2002). Boogie Man: The Adventures of John Lee Hooker in the American Twentieth Century. New York City: Macmillan. ISBN 978-0-312-27006-3.
- Norton, Kay (2016). Singing and Wellbeing: Ancient Wisdom, Modern Proof. New York City: Routledge. ISBN 978-1317578871.
- Perone, James E. (2019). Listen to the Blues!: Exploring a Musical Genre. Santa Barbara, California: ABC-CLIO. ISBN 978-1-4408-6614-2.
- Perry, John (2004). Jimi Hendrix's Electric Ladyland. New York City: Continuum Books. ISBN 978-0826415714.
- Redding, Noel; Appleby, Carol (1990). Are You Experienced?. Pan Books. ISBN 0-330-31923-X.
- Roby, Steven (2002). Black Gold: The Lost Archives of Jimi Hendrix. New York City: Billboard Books. ISBN 0-8230-7854-X.
- Roby, Steven; Schreiber, Brad (2010). Becoming Jimi Hendrix. Cambridge, Massachusetts: Da Capo Press. ISBN 978-0-306-81910-0.
- Shadwick, Keith (2003). Jimi Hendrix: Musician (1st. ed.). San Francisco: Backbeat Books. ISBN 0-87930-764-1.
- Shapiro, Harry; Glebbeek, Cesar (1990). Jimi Hendrix: Electric Gypsy. New York City: St. Martin's Press. ISBN 0-312-05861-6.
- Wheeler, Tom; Gore, Joe (1992). Variations on a Theme: Red House. Milwaukee, Wisconsin: Bella Godiva Music/Hal Leonard Publishing. ISBN 0-7935-1719-2.
