= The Baggy's Rehearsal Sessions =

Compilation album by Jimi Hendrix
- Released: June 25, 2002
- Recorded: December 18 and 19, 1969
- Studios: Baggy's, New York City
- Genre: Rock
- Length: 67:39
- Label: Dagger

Jimi Hendrix chronology
Live in Ottawa (2001)	The Baggy's Rehearsal Sessions (2002)	Blue Wild Angel: Live at the Isle of Wight (2002)

The Baggy's Rehearsal Sessions is a posthumous compilation album by Jimi Hendrix, released on June 25, 2002 by Dagger Records. The album contains recordings from two rehearsal sessions (on December 18 and 19, 1969) for the Band of Gypsys' performances at the Fillmore East on December 31, 1969 and January 1, 1970.

== Track listing ==
All songs were written by Jimi Hendrix, except where noted.

No.	Title	Length
1.	"Burning Desire"	9:33
2.	"Hoochie Coochie Man" (Willie Dixon)	5:57
3.	"Message to Love"	4:50
4.	"Ezy Ryder"	5:32
5.	"Power of Soul"	7:33
6.	"Earth Blues"	5:10
7.	"Changes" (Buddy Miles)	5:20
8.	"Lover Man"	3:39
9.	"We Gotta Live Together" (Miles)	0:44
10.	"Baggy's Jam"	4:55
11.	"Earth Blues"	6:26
12.	"Burning Desire"	7:20
Total length:		01:06:39

== Personnel ==
- Jimi Hendrix – guitar, lead vocals, backing vocals on tracks 7, and 9
- Buddy Miles – drums, backing vocals, lead vocals on tracks 7, and 9
- Billy Cox – bass, backing vocals
