= Dagger Records =

American record label

- Parent company: Experience Hendrix
- Founder: James "Al" Hendrix
- Distributor: MCA
- Genre: Rock, psychedelic rock, blues-rock, acid rock
- Country of origin: United States
- Location: Seattle, Washington
- Official website: www.daggerrecords.com

Dagger Records is an American record label based in Seattle, Washington. Dagger produces and releases, in conjunction with Experience Hendrix, L.L.C., and MCA Records, official Jimi Hendrix bootlegs and collections of rare studio recordings.

The first Dagger release was Live at the Oakland Coliseum, a live album documenting The Jimi Hendrix Experience's performance at the Oakland Coliseum, Oakland, California, on April 27, 1969. The label has released twelve albums from to 1998 to 2012, one album nearly every year (except in 2007, 2010 and 2011), and a thirteenth (and last to date) album in 2017. Dagger releases are not distributed to retail outlets, they are only available by ordering online from the company themselves or Authentic Hendrix.

== Releases ==
1. Live at the Oakland Coliseum (1998)
2. Live at Clark University (1999)
3. Morning Symphony Ideas (2000)
4. Live in Ottawa (2001)
5. The Baggy's Rehearsal Sessions (2002))
6. Paris 1967/San Francisco 1968 (2003)
7. Hear My Music (2004)
8. Live at the Isle of Fehmarn (2005)
9. Burning Desire (2006)
10. Live in Paris & Ottawa 1968 (2008)
11. Live at Woburn (2009)
12. Live in Cologne (2012)
13. Live At George’s Club 20 1965 & 1966 (2017)

== See also ==
- List of record labels
