= Miami Pop Festival (May 1968) =

Music festival held in Hallandale, Florida

Coordinates: 25.978474°N 80.13799°W

1968 Pop Festival
- Genre: Rock, pop
- Dates: May 18–19, 1968
- Locations: Hallandale, Florida, United States
- Years active: 1968
- Founders: Richard O'Barry and Michael Lang
- Attendance: 25,000

The Miami Pop Festival is the name by which a music festival that took place on May 18–19, 1968 in Hallandale, Florida, is sometimes known. The venue was Gulfstream Park, a horse racing track just north of Miami. The event, which was officially publicized on promotional materials and in radio ads as the "1968 Pop and Underground Festival," and "The 1968 Pop Festival," was promoted by Richard O'Barry, Marshall Brevetz and Michael Lang, the latter of whom became famous as one of the four promoters of Woodstock in 1969. Decades later, the May 1968 festival began to be referred to colloquially as the "Miami Pop Festival", leading to confusion with the actual Miami Pop Festival, which took place in December 1968.

== History ==
=== The festival ===
An estimated 25,000 people attended this event. Bands featured at the festival included The Jimi Hendrix Experience, The Mothers of Invention, Blue Cheer, Chuck Berry, John Lee Hooker, The Crazy World of Arthur Brown, Blues Image, Charles Austin Group, and Evil. The opening act on Saturday was a little-known group called The Package, and the closing act was The Jimi Hendrix Experience. The second part of what was scheduled as a two-day event, Sunday's concert was rained out, but there was at least one beneficial result — it inspired Hendrix to write "Rainy Day, Dream Away."

=== Media ===
On November 5, 2013, a CD and DVD were released containing the first available audio and film of the Experience at the festival. The CD Miami Pop Festival contains about an hour of previously unreleased music. The DVD,Jimi Hendrix: Hear My Train a Comin’ features a two-hour documentary on Hendrix's life, including previously unseen film of Hendrix and the band at the Miami festival as well as some extras with additional footage from the festival. The documentary was also broadcast in the U.S. on November 5, 2013, by the Public Broadcasting Service as part of its American Masters series.

== See also ==
- List of historic rock festivals
