= Spanish Castle Magic =

Song by the Jimi Hendrix Experience

from the album Axis: Bold as Love
- Released: December 1, 1967 (UK); January 15, 1968 (US)
- Recorded: October 27 & 28, 1967
- Studio: Olympic, London
- Genre: Rock; blues rock
- Length: 3:06
- Label: Track (UK); Reprise (US)
- Songwriter: Jimi Hendrix
- Producer: Chas Chandler

"Spanish Castle Magic" is a song written by Jimi Hendrix and performed by the Jimi Hendrix Experience. Produced by Chas Chandler, it is the third track from the album Axis: Bold as Love. The lyrics refer to a club near Seattle, where Hendrix sometimes played early in his career. The song was a staple of live shows and several live recordings were released after Hendrix's death.

== Background ==
The lyrics were inspired by Hendrix's high school years (roughly 1958–1961), when he regularly visited a roadhouse called "The Spanish Castle". The club was situated to the south of Seattle in what was then unincorporated King County (now the city of Des Moines, Washington). It was built in the 1930s to avoid Seattle's then restrictive nightclub laws. By 1959, the club began featuring top local rock groups such as The Fabulous Wailers and occasional touring stars. Hendrix was able to jam with local groups at the Spanish Castle during dance hall events booked by promoter and DJ Pat O'Day.

== Recording ==
The song features Noel Redding playing an eight-string Hagstrom bass routed through an Octavia effects unit, which Hendrix later overdubbed using the same bass. Hendrix also overdubbed some jazz chords on the piano, which he had heard sound engineer Eddie Kramer playing. Hendrix biographer Harry Shapiro commented on the song's instrumentation: "[The] guitar and bass in unison has the immediate effect of locking up a song in a strong rhythmic voice ... [Hendrix uses] some unusual chord progressions and a large number of note bends in the solo ending up with a crazy double-stop." AllMusic's Matthew Greenwald calls the progression "proto-heavy metal" and compares it to the earlier Experience song, "Foxy Lady".

== Live releases ==
"Spanish Castle Magic" is one of the few songs from Axis: Bold as Love that Hendrix regularly performed in concert. Live recordings of the song are found on BBC Sessions, Live at the Oakland Coliseum, Stages, Live in Ottawa, Live at Woodstock, Blue Wild Angel: Live at the Isle of Wight, Winterland, and The Jimi Hendrix Experience box set.
