= Burning Desire =

Compilation album by Jimi Hendrix
- Released: December 12, 2006
- Recorded: November 7, 1969; January 7 & 23, 1970
- Studio: Record Plant, New York City
- Genre: Rock
- Length: 65:30
- Label: Dagger
- Producer: Janie Hendrix; Eddie Kramer; John McDermott

Jimi Hendrix chronology
Live at the Isle of Fehmarn (2005)	Burning Desire (2006)	Live at Monterey (2007)

Burning Desire is a posthumous compilation album by Jimi Hendrix, released on December 12, 2006 by Dagger Records. It contains instrumental studio jams and rough demos recorded in late 1969 and early 1970. Backing Hendrix are drummer Buddy Miles and bassist Billy Cox, who recorded the live Band of Gypsys album (1970).

== Track listing ==
All songs were written by Jimi Hendrix. All tracks recorded at Record Plant Studios.

No.	Title	Recording date	Length
1.	"Izabella"	November 7, 1969	4:23
2.	"Ezy Ryder/MLK" (aka Captain Coconut)	January 23, 1970	19:59
3.	"Cherokee Mist/Astro Man"	January 7, 1970	5:18
4.	"Record Plant 2X"	January 23, 1970	11:03
5.	"Villanova Junction Blues"	January 23, 1970	4:56
6.	"Burning Desire"	January 23, 1970	7:27
7.	"Stepping Stone/Villanova Junction Blues"	November 7, 1969	6:38
8.	"Slow Time Blues"	January 23, 1970	3:49

== Personnel ==
- Jimi Hendrix – guitars
- Buddy Miles – drums
- Billy Cox – bass guitar
