= The Wind Cries Mary =

- West German single picture sleeve

Single by the Jimi Hendrix Experience

from the album Are You Experienced (US Edition)
- A-side: "Purple Haze" (US)
- B-side: "Highway Chile" (UK)
- Released: May 5, 1967 (UK); June 19, 1967 (US)
- Recorded: January 11, 1967
- Studio: De Lane Lea, London
- Genre: Rock
- Length: 3:21
- Label: Track (UK); Reprise (US)
- Songwriter: Jimi Hendrix
- Producer: Chas Chandler

Experience UK singles chronology
"Purple Haze" (1967)	"The Wind Cries Mary" (1967)	"Burning of the Midnight Lamp" (1967)

Experience US singles chronology
"Hey Joe" (1967)	"The Wind Cries Mary" (1967)	"Foxy Lady" (1967)

"The Wind Cries Mary" is a rock ballad by Jimi Hendrix. Hendrix wrote the song as a reconciliatory love song for his girlfriend in London, Kathy Etchingham. More recent biographical material indicates that some of the lyrics appeared in poetry written by Hendrix earlier in his career when he was in Seattle.

== Background and recording ==
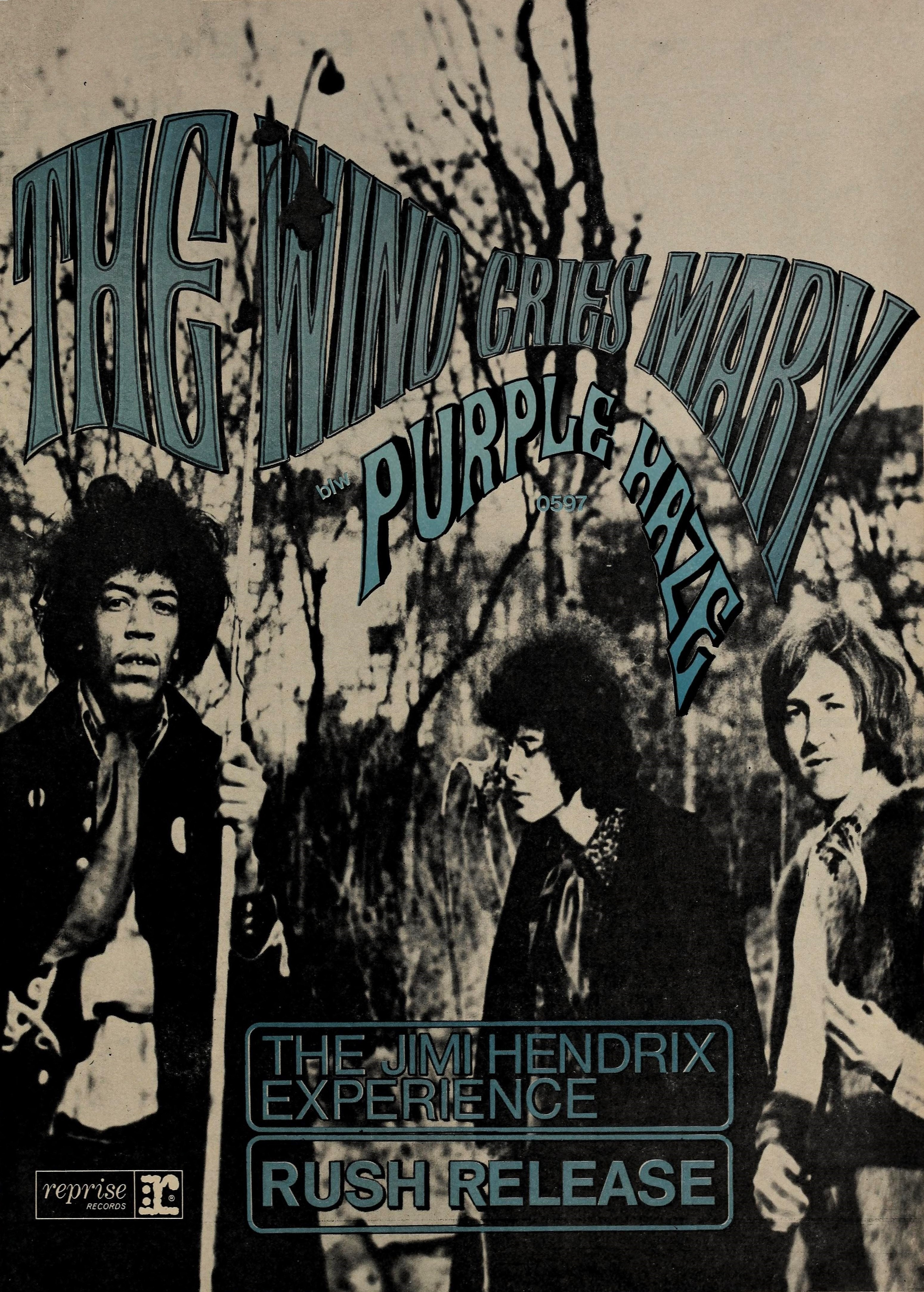
Cashbox advertisement, June 24, 1967

According to Hendrix's then-girlfriend Kathy Etchingham, he wrote the lyrics after an argument with her about her cooking lumpy mashed potatoes, using "Mary" (Etchingham's middle name). Etchingham suggested that the line in the song "a broom is drearily sweeping up the broken pieces of yesterday's life" represents Hendrix sweeping up the broken dishes she threw as a result of the argument. In a later interview, Hendrix commented that the lyrics represent "more than one person". Music journalist David Stubbs pointed out that Hendrix also used the line from the song “Somewhere a Queen is weeping / Somewhere a King has no wife" in a poem he wrote to another Mary who had been his girlfriend, Mary Washington.

Billy Cox, Hendrix's long-time friend and later bassist, has noted Curtis Mayfield's influence on the song. Hendrix performed elements of an early version in the summer of 1966 with his band Jimmy James and the Blue Flames in New York City.

The Experience recorded it at De Lane Lea Studios in London in February 1967, during sessions for their follow-up single to "Hey Joe". Hendrix producer Chas Chandler commented on the recording:

That was recorded at the tail end of the session for "Fire". We had about twenty minutes or so left. I suggested we cut a demo of "The Wind Cries Mary". Mitch Mitchell [drummer] and Noel Redding [bassist] hadn't heard it, so they were going about it without a rehearsal. They played it once through [and Hendrix then suggested overdubs]. In all he put on four or five more overdubs, but the whole thing was done in twenty minutes. That was our third single.

The single, backed by "Highway Chile", was released in the UK in May 1967 and reached number six on the UK Singles Chart. In the United States, the song was first released as the B-side of the "Purple Haze" single in June 1967. It was later included on the American Edition of Are You Experienced album, released in August 1967.

== Charts ==
Weekly chart performance for "The Wind Cries Mary”
Chart (1967)	Peak position
Australia (Kent Music Report)	12
Austria (Ö3 Austria Top 40)	18
Belgium (Ultratop 50 Wallonia)	35
Netherlands (Single Top 100)	6
UK Singles (OCC)	6
West Germany (Media Control)	35

== Performance ==
Hendrix performed the song live often in 1967 and 1968. A recording from the Monterey Pop Festival was later released on Jimi Plays Monterey (1986) and Live at Monterey (2007); another from the Paris L'Olympia Theatre appeared on Stages (1991), The Jimi Hendrix Experience (2000), and Live in Paris & Ottawa 1968 (2008). Stages also includes a 1967 recording from a Stockholm concert.

== Impact and legacy ==
Rolling Stone magazine ranked "The Wind Cries Mary" number 379 on its list of the "500 Greatest Songs of All Time".
