= Capitol Cinema (Ottawa) =

Movie theatre in Ottawa, Ontario, Canada

Coordinates: 45.420548°N 75.700804°W

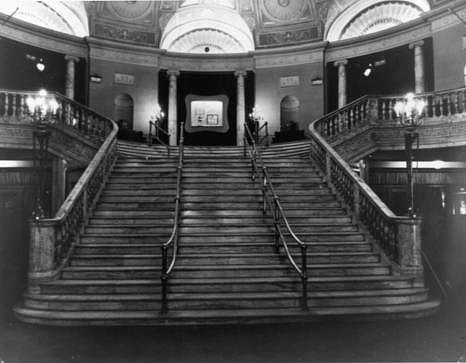
- Capitol Cinema lobby
- Interactive map of the Capitol Cinema area

General information
- Location: Ottawa, Ontario, Canada
- Opened: November 8, 1920
- Demolished: 1970

Design and construction
- Architect: Thomas W. Lamb

Other information
- Seating capacity: 2530

The Capitol Cinema (constructed 1920, demolished 1970) was the largest movie theatre ever built in Ottawa, Ontario, Canada, and was the city's only true movie palace. Opened in 1920, the 2530-seat cinema was regarded as one of the best cinemas designed by famed theatre-architect Thomas W. Lamb.

== The grand opening ==
The Capitol was located at the southwest corner of the intersection of Queen Street and Bank Street, and was opened by the Loews chain on November 8, 1920. In honour of the new theatre, a special train from New York City arrived at Ottawa's Union Station, carrying Marcus Loew, Thomas Lamb, and more than a dozen silent film stars of the day, including Matt Moore and Texas Guinan. The train was greeted by the Governor General's Foot Guards band and thousands of movie fans.

A motorcade took the visitors to the City Hall on Elgin Street, where the Mayor, Harold Fisher, was on hand for an official greeting. After a short tour of the city, the visitors were greeted by James Alexander Lougheed on Parliament Hill, and then taken to their accommodations in the Château Laurier. The crowds that greeted the motorcade at each stage of its procession through the city were described by the Ottawa Citizen as "throngs" with "unrivalled scenes of enthusiasm".

The opening performance that evening consisted of two films, D.W. Griffith's "The Love Flower" and a comedy entitled "Cheer Up", and four vaudeville acts. Crowds of people who were unable to obtain tickets for the sold-out show lingered on the sidewalks outside the theatre throughout the evening.

After the performance, the revelry continued at City Hall, where the visiting celebrities and local notables celebrated until dawn, with the actress Texas Guinan reportedly orchestrating the celebrations from the Mayor's chair. News of the party erupted into a scandal over the following weeks, with many questioning the appropriateness of hosting the alleged debauchery at the seat of local government and whether city funds had been used to purchase alcohol for the event. One city councillor, Napoléon Champagne, later defended his attendance at the party in the Ottawa Citizen by claiming that he had been "looking after the married men".

== Ottawa's landmark cinema ==
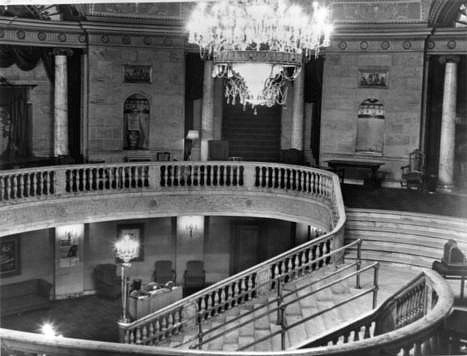
Capitol Cinema lobby

In the era of the downtown movie palaces, theatres were typically built with a narrow entrance on the main thoroughfare, with a long foyer leading to the auditorium well at the rear. This enabled the bulk of the building to be constructed on cheaper land well away from the thoroughfare. Toronto's Loews and Pantages theaters, also designed by Thomas Lamb, were classic examples of this trend, with both theatres having narrow frontages on Yonge Street and auditoriums on a rear side street.

Ottawa's Loews theater was different, as it occupied the entirety of a prime downtown corner site. This enabled Lamb to design a grander lobby for the theater, with a majestic marble staircase and balustrade, a colonnaded mezzanine, and a domed ceiling with a great crystal chandelier. The auditorium was equally impressive, with its ornate proscenium arch, hand-painted ceiling dome, box seats, and balcony. The Capitol was considered to be among the finest movie palaces in North America. In Palaces of the Night, John Lindsay wrote: "many feel the Ottawa Capitol was the most attractive of all of Lamb's theatres", with "the grandest split staircase and lobby anywhere".

Loews main competitor in Canada, Famous Players, promised an even larger flagship theatre on Sparks Street to trump the Loews cinema on Queen Street. With a population of 150,000 at that time, however, Ottawa was likely unable to support two 2500-seat theatres, despite Famous Players' pronouncements. In 1924, Loews sold off its Canadian theatres, and the American Keith theatre circuit (which went on to become RKO Pictures) was able to outbid Famous Players for the Ottawa Loews. The cinema was renamed "Keith's Vaudeville", and shortly thereafter the marquee was changed again to the "RKO Capitol".

For five years, Famous Players continued to announce on an annual basis that it would be building a competing cinema on Sparks Street. In 1929, however, Famous Players merged with RKO's Canadian operations, and Ottawa's largest theatre finally became part of the Famous Players chain. The name of the theatre was ultimately changed to simply "the Capitol".

Despite the end of the vaudeville era, the Capitol continued to host musical concerts, plays and other events, along with its main film programming, throughout its history. The Capitol was the most prestigious auditorium in the National Capital Region, and it was at the centre of the city's cultural and social life. Its stage hosted, among others, Nelson Eddy, Ethel Barrymore, John Gielgud, Maurice Chevalier, Michael Redgrave, Victor Borge, Pearl Bailey, Nat King Cole, Vladimir Horowitz, Glenn Gould, the Metropolitan Opera Company, the Royal Philharmonic Orchestra and the Toronto Symphony Orchestra.

In later years, The Who, Jimi Hendrix, Cream and Ravi Shankar all performed at the Capitol. Recordings of Hendrix's 1968 concert and The Who's 1969 concert at the Capitol circulating for years as two of the most sought-after bootleg recordings of the respective performers (in 2001, Hendrix's 1968 bootleg was finally released as a legitimate recording under the name "Live in Ottawa"). The recording of The Who's performance was released as a bonus disc with a remastered Tommy re-release in 2013.

== Demolition ==
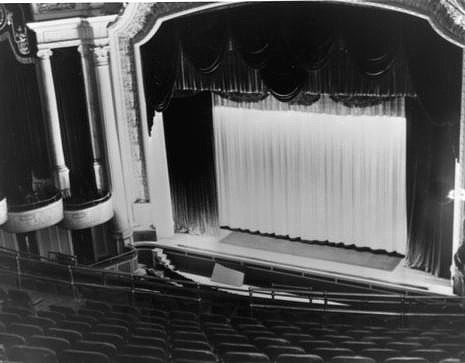
The Capitol Cinema auditorium in 1943

In 1964, Famous Players announced that the Capitol would be divided into two theatres, to replicate the success of the nearby two-screen Elgin Theatre. The chain never acted on this announcement, however, perhaps in deference to the Capitol's role as Ottawa's main stage.

When the plans for the National Arts Centre were announced, the end of the Capitol was near. By the end of the 1960s, it was impossible to fill the Capitol's 2530 seats with the showing of a film. The president of the Famous Players chain, George Destounis, was quoted in the Ottawa Journal in July 1969 as saying: "It's a beautiful theatre, but it has outlived its purpose".

Deemed to be superfluous once the National Arts Centre was completed and an anachronism in the age of the multiplex, the Capitol was closed on May 1, 1970 and subsequently demolished. The last regularly scheduled film was M*A*S*H, but the actual last show was a sold-out benefit performance that included a stage show and a special screening of the Mary Pickford film, Pollyanna. The event was emceed by Alex Trebek, and the audience ended the show with a sad rendition of "Auld Lang Syne".

There was little the residents of Ottawa could do to stop the demolition; the provincial government of Ontario would not enact heritage protection legislation for another five years. The Capitol was replaced by an office building that contained the three-screen "Capitol Square" multiplex. The Capitol Square was itself closed and converted to office space in 1999.

== See also ==
- List of Ottawa-Gatineau cinemas
