= Foxy Lady =

- West German single picture sleeve

Single by The Jimi Hendrix Experience

from the album Are You Experienced
- B-side: "Hey Joe" (US) "Manic Depression" (Germany)
- Released: May 12, 1967 (UK album); August 23, 1967 (US album)
- Recorded: December 13, 1966
- Studio: CBS, London
- Genre: Psychedelic rock; hard rock; proto-metal
- Length: 3:10
- Label: Track (UK album); Reprise (US single)
- Songwriter: Jimi Hendrix
- Producer: Chas Chandler

Experience US singles chronology
"The Wind Cries Mary" (1967)	"Foxy Lady" (1967)	"Up from the Skies" (1968)

"Foxy Lady" (or alternatively "Foxey Lady") is a song by the Jimi Hendrix Experience. It first appeared on their 1967 debut album Are You Experienced and was later issued as their third single in the U.S. with the alternate spelling. It is one of Hendrix's best-known songs and was frequently performed in concerts throughout his career. Rolling Stone magazine placed the song at number 153 on its list of the "500 Greatest Songs of All Time".

== Composition and lyrics ==
Music critic Thomas Ward points out "if one song could be said to encapsulate Hendrix’s entire oeuvre, 'Foxey Lady' is certainly closer than most". The song opens with a fingered note "shaken in a wide exaggerated vibrato" so the adjacent strings are sounded. After the amplifier is allowed to feed back, Hendrix slides down to the rhythm figure, which uses a dominant seventh sharp ninth chord, a jazz and rhythm and blues-style chord, often referred to as the "Hendrix chord". (Note: In "Foxy Lady", Hendrix plays a simpler chord without the major third. By contrast, the "Hendrix chord" used in the song "Purple Haze" contains a major third, minor seventh and augmented ninth interval.) Hendrix's biographer Keith Shadwick writes:

[Hendrix] casts the whole solo in the blues vernacular, using bent notes and glisses, or slides, between the notes primarily within the blues or pentatonic scales. To that he adds the new melodicism he had been hearing on recent British rock records.

Prior to the recording, the group had not worked out an ending for the song and bassist Noel Redding claimed that using the last IV chord was his idea. Hendrix biographer Harry Shapiro suggests that song's lyrics were inspired by Heather Taylor, who later married Roger Daltrey of the Who. Hendrix later commented that he did not approach women in such a straightforward manner as the lyrics suggested. Lithofayne "Faye" Pridgon, Hendrix's girlfriend in the mid-1960s, has also been suggested as the inspiration for the song.

== Releases and charts ==
Hendrix's American record company Reprise Records issued the song as the third single of their debut album in December 1967, one month before the release of the second Experience album, Axis: Bold as Love. Reprise used the title "Foxey Lady", which also appeared on the North American release of Are You Experienced. It was backed with "Hey Joe", which Reprise had already released as a single in April 1967. Although Hendrix's albums performed quite well on the record charts, "Foxy Lady", along with the other early singles, made a relatively weak showing, peaking at number 67 on the Billboard Hot 100 pop singles chart. In 1967, Polydor Records issued the single in Germany with "Manic Depression" as the B-side, but it did not appear on the charts. Record World said of the single that "This one has the beat to perk up teen ears. Jimi wails it in nitty gritty fashion."

"Foxy Lady" has appeared on numerous Hendrix compilation albums, including Smash Hits, The Essential Jimi Hendrix Volume Two, Cornerstones: 1967–1970, The Ultimate Experience, Experience Hendrix: The Best of Jimi Hendrix, and The Singles Collection. It is also one of the few songs to be performed by each of the different Hendrix lineups, including the Experience, Gypsy Sun and Rainbows, the Band of Gypsys, and the Cry of Love touring group. Live renditions appear on Live at Monterey, Live at Woodstock, Band of Gypsys 2, Blue Wild Angel: Live at the Isle of Wight, and several other live albums. Rolling Stone magazine ranked "Foxy Lady" at number 153 on its list of the "500 Greatest Songs of All Time". In 2020, Far Out ranked the song number six on their list of the 20 greatest Jimi Hendrix songs, and in 2021, American Songwriter ranked the song number four on their list of the 10 greatest Jimi Hendrix songs.

== Certifications ==
Region	Certification	Certified units/sales
New Zealand (RMNZ)	Gold	15,000^{‡}
^{‡} Sales+streaming figures based on certification alone.

== Sources ==
- Hal Leonard (1998). Experience Hendrix: The Best of Jimi Hendrix Transcribed Scores. Hal Leonard Corporation. ISBN 978-0-7935-9144-2.
- McDermott, John; Kramer, Eddie; Cox, Billy (2009). Ultimate Hendrix. Backbeat Books. ISBN 978-0-87930-938-1.
- Redding, Noel (1993). Are You Experienced? (1993 MCA reissue notes). Jimi Hendrix Experience. MCA Records. MCAD-10893.
- Shadwick, Keith (2003). Jimi Hendrix: Musician. Backbeat Books. ISBN 0-87930-764-1.
- Shapiro, Harry; Glebbeek, Cesar (1990). Jimi Hendrix: Electric Gypsy. St. Martin's Press. ISBN 0-312-05861-6.
