= Jimi Hendrix discography =

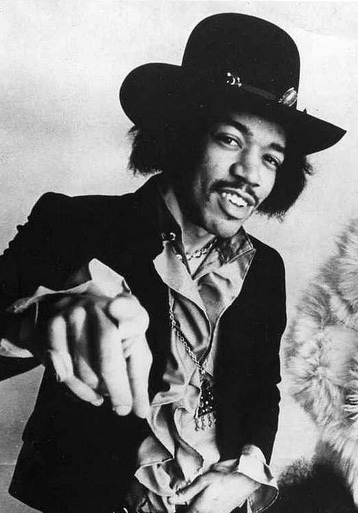
- Hendrix in 1968
- Studio albums: 3
- Live albums: 3
- Compilation albums: 2
- Singles: 14
- Albums as sideman: 9
- Singles as sideman: 24

Jimi Hendrix (1942–1970) was an American guitarist whose career spanned from 1962 to 1970. His discography includes the recordings released during his lifetime. Prior to his rise to fame, he recorded 24 singles as a backing guitarist with American R&B artists, such as the Isley Brothers and Little Richard. Beginning in late 1966, he recorded three best-selling studio albums and 13 singles with the Jimi Hendrix Experience. An Experience compilation album and half of a live album recorded at the Monterey Pop Festival were also issued prior to his death. After the breakup of the Experience in mid-1969, songs from his live performances were included on the Woodstock: Music from the Original Soundtrack and More and Band of Gypsys albums. A studio single with the Band of Gypsys was also released.

Hendrix's albums and singles with the Experience were originally released by Track Records in the United Kingdom and Reprise Records in the United States. Track also issued the Band of Gypsys' album, but to settle an American contract dispute, it was released by Capitol Records in the US. The Woodstock soundtrack album was issued by Atlantic Records and its subsidiary Cotillion Records in US. Over the years, the Hendrix catalogue has been handled by different record companies, including Track's successor, Polydor Records in Europe and the UK, and MCA Records. In 2010, Sony's Legacy Recordings became the exclusive distributor for the recordings managed by Experience Hendrix, a family company. His original albums have been reissued, sometimes with new album art, mixes, and bonus material.

Hendrix's work as an accompanist appears on several different labels. After he became popular, Hendrix contributed to recordings by several different artists. In addition to the legitimate singles and albums released before his death, two albums worth of demos and outtakes recorded with Curtis Knight with misleading cover art and titles were released, which Hendrix publicly denounced. After his death, many more such albums appeared.

== Albums ==
=== Studio albums ===
Year	Album details		Peak chart positions			Certifications (sales thresholds)
Year	Album details		US	UK	Other	Certifications (sales thresholds)
Year	US release	UK release	US	UK	Other	Certifications (sales thresholds)
1967	Are You Experienced (Note: The original British and American Are You Experienced LPs have different track listings.)		5	2	(Note: Are You Experienced: US R&B No. 10, Canada No. 15, Germany No. 17, Norway No. 3)	RIAA: 6× Platinum; BPI: Gold
1967	Released: August 23, 1967; Label: Reprise (RS 6261)	Released: May 12, 1967; Label: Track (612 001)	5	2	(Note: Are You Experienced: US R&B No. 10, Canada No. 15, Germany No. 17, Norway No. 3)	RIAA: 6× Platinum; BPI: Gold
1967	Axis: Bold as Love		3	5	(Note: Axis: Bold as Love: US R&B No. 6, Germany No. 21, Norway No. 12)	RIAA: Platinum; BPI: Gold
1967	Released: January 15, 1968; Label: Reprise (RS 6281)	Released: December 1, 1967; Label: Track (613 003)	3	5	(Note: Axis: Bold as Love: US R&B No. 6, Germany No. 21, Norway No. 12)	RIAA: Platinum; BPI: Gold
1968	Electric Ladyland		1	6	(Note: Electric Ladyland: US R&B No. 5, Canada No. 1, Germany No. 12, Norway No. 13)	RIAA: 3× Platinum; BPI: Gold
1968	Released: October 16, 1968; Label: Reprise (2RS 6307)	Released: October 25, 1968; Label: Track (613 008/9)	1	6	(Note: Electric Ladyland: US R&B No. 5, Canada No. 1, Germany No. 12, Norway No. 13)	RIAA: 3× Platinum; BPI: Gold

=== Live albums ===
Year	Album details		Peak chart positions			Certifications (sales thresholds)
Year	Album details		US	UK	Other	Certifications (sales thresholds)
Year	US release	UK release	US	UK	Other	Certifications (sales thresholds)
1970	Band of Gypsys		5	6	(Note: Band of Gypsys: US R&B No. 14, Australia No. 4, Canada No. 5, Germany No. 15, Netherlands No. 7, Norway No. 9)	RIAA: 2× Platinum
1970	Released: March 25, 1970; Label: Capitol (STAO-472)	Released: June 12, 1970; Label: Track (2406 001)	5	6	(Note: Band of Gypsys: US R&B No. 14, Australia No. 4, Canada No. 5, Germany No. 15, Netherlands No. 7, Norway No. 9)	RIAA: 2× Platinum
1970	Woodstock: Music from the Original Soundtrack and More (Note: Hendrix contributes a medley of "The Star-Spangled Banner", "Purple Haze", and an instrumental ("Villanova Junction") to the Woodstock soundtrack; the rest is by various artists.)		1	35	(Note: Woodstock: Music from the Original Soundtrack and More: Canada No. 1)	RIAA: 2× Platinum
1970	Released: May 27, 1970; Label: Cotillion (SD 3500)	Released: June 1970; Label: Atlantic (K60001)	1	35	(Note: Woodstock: Music from the Original Soundtrack and More: Canada No. 1)	RIAA: 2× Platinum
1970	Historic Performances Recorded at the Monterey International Pop Festival (Note: Half (one LP side) of the Monterey album features the Experience and the other Otis Redding.)		16	—	(Note: Historic Performances Recorded at the Monterey International Pop Festival: US R&B No. 15, Germany No. 9)	RIAA: Gold
1970	Released: August 26, 1970; Label: Reprise (MS 2029)	Not released	16	—	(Note: Historic Performances Recorded at the Monterey International Pop Festival: US R&B No. 15, Germany No. 9)	RIAA: Gold
"—" denotes a release that did not chart or was not issued in that region.

=== Compilation albums ===
Year	Album details		Peak chart positions			Certifications (sales thresholds)
Year	Album details		US	UK	Other	Certifications (sales thresholds)
Year	US release	UK release	US	UK	Other	Certifications (sales thresholds)
1968	Smash Hits (Note: The original British and American Smash Hits LPs have different track listings.)		6	4	(Note: Smash Hits: US R&B No. 22, Canada No. 3, Germany No. 19, Norway No. 11)	RIAA: 2× Platinum; BPI: Silver
1968	Released: July 30, 1969; Label: Reprise (MS-2025)	Released: April 12, 1968; Label: Track (613004)	6	4	(Note: Smash Hits: US R&B No. 22, Canada No. 3, Germany No. 19, Norway No. 11)	RIAA: 2× Platinum; BPI: Silver
1968	Electric Jimi Hendrix (Note: Electric Jimi Hendrix, a single LP version of Electric Ladyland, was released in the UK only and immediately withdrawn.)		—	—	—	
1968	Not released	Released: 1968; Label: Track (2856 002)	—	—	—	
"—" denotes a release that did not chart or was not issued in that region.

== Singles ==
Year	Single details	Peak chart positions			Album
Year	Single details	US	UK	Other	Album
1966	"Hey Joe" / "Stone Free": Released: December 16, 1966 (UK); Label: Polydor (56139)	—	6	(Note: "Hey Joe": Australia No. 40, Germany No. 21, Netherlands No. 8, Norway No. 10)	Are You Experienced (expanded CD editions with both UK and US tracks)
1967	"Purple Haze" / "51st Anniversary": Released: March 17, 1967 (UK); Label: Track (604001)	—	3	(Note: "Purple Haze": Germany No. 17, Netherlands No. 11, Norway No. 7)	Are You Experienced (expanded CD editions with both UK and US tracks)
1967	"Hey Joe" / "51st Anniversary": Released: May 1, 1967 (US); Label: Reprise (0572)	—	—	—	Are You Experienced (expanded CD editions with both UK and US tracks)
1967	"The Wind Cries Mary" / "Highway Chile": Released: May 5, 1967 (UK); Label: Track (604004)	—	6	(Note: "The Wind Cries Mary": Australia No. 12, Germany No. 35, Netherlands No. 6)	Are You Experienced (expanded CD editions with both UK and US tracks)
1967	"Purple Haze" / "The Wind Cries Mary": Released: June 19, 1967 (US); Label: Reprise (0597)	65	—	—	Are You Experienced (expanded CD editions with both UK and US tracks)
1967	"Burning of the Midnight Lamp" / "The Stars That Play with Laughing Sam's Dice": Released: August 19, 1967 (UK); Label: Track (604007)	—	18	(Note: "Burning of the Midnight Lamp": Australia No. 22, Germany No. 27, Netherlands No. 20)	Smash Hits (UK), Electric Ladyland (Note: "Burning of the Midnight Lamp" was initially a non-album single before being included on the UK Smash Hits and Electric Ladyland.)
1967	"Foxy Lady" / "Hey Joe": Released: December 13, 1967 (US); Label: Reprise (0641)	67	—	(Note: "Foxy Lady"/"Fire": Australia No. 29)	Are You Experienced
1968	"Up from the Skies" / "One Rainy Wish": Released: February 26, 1968 (US); Label: Reprise (0665)	82	—	—	Axis: Bold as Love
1968	"All Along the Watchtower" / "Burning of the Midnight Lamp": Released: September 2, 1968 (US); Label: Reprise (0767)	20	—	—	Electric Ladyland
1968	"All Along the Watchtower" / "Long Hot Summer Night": Released: October 18, 1968 (UK); Label: Track (604025)	—	5	(Note: "All Along the Watchtower": Australia No. 9, Canada No. 16, Germany No. 21, Netherlands No. 9)	Electric Ladyland
1968	"Crosstown Traffic" / "Gypsy Eyes": Released: November 18, 1968 (US), April 4, 1969 (UK); Label: Reprise (0792), Track (604029)	52	37	(Note: "Crosstown Traffic": Australia No. 38, Canada No. 64, Germany No. 34, Netherlands No. 48)	Electric Ladyland
1969	"Stone Free" / "If 6 Was 9": Released: September 15, 1969 (US); Label: Reprise (0853)	— (Note: "Stone Free": No. 130 on Billboard Bubbling Under Hot 100 Singles chart.)	—	—	Smash Hits (US)
1969	"Let Me Light Your Fire" / "Burning of the Midnight Lamp": Released: November 14, 1969 (UK); Label: Track (604033)	—	—	—	Smash Hits (UK)
1970	"Stepping Stone" / "Izabella" as Hendrix Band of Gypsys: Released: April 13, 1970 (US); Label: Reprise (0905)	—	—	—	Kiss the Sky, Voodoo Child (Note: Band of Gypsys' version of "Stepping Stone" was initially released as a non-album single before being included on Kiss the Sky and Voodoo Child; with Mitch Mitchell drum and other overdubs appeared on War Heroes and First Rays of the New Rising Sun; with Bruce Gary drum overdubs on Voodoo Soup.)
"—" denotes a release that did not chart or was not issued in that region.

== Hendrix as an accompanist ==
=== Albums as sideman ===
Year	Artist	Title	Songs (guitar, except where noted)	Peak chart positions	
Year	Artist	Title	Songs (guitar, except where noted)	US	UK
1965	Don Covay & the Goodtimers	Mercy!: Released: January 1965 (US); Label: Atlantic (8104)	"Mercy, Mercy", "Can't Stay Away"	—	—
1967	Curtis Knight	Get That Feeling: Released: December 1967 (US), December 30, 1967 (UK); Label: Capitol (ST-2856), London (SH 8349)	All eight songs	75	39
1968	McGough & McGear	McGough & McGear: Released: April 1968 (UK); Label: Parlophone (PCS 7047)	"So Much", "Ex Art Student"	—	—
1968	Curtis Knight	Flashing/Jimi Hendrix Plays Curtis Knight Sings: Released: December 1968 (US); Label: Capitol (ST-2894)	All nine songs	—	—
1968	Curtis Knight	The Great Jimi Hendrix in New York: Released: December 1968 (NL); Label: London (379 008 XNU)	All songs except "My Heart Is Higher"	—	—
1969	Eire Apparent	Sunrise: Released: May 12, 1969 (UK), 1969 (US); Label: Buddah (203 021), Buddah (BDS 5031)	"Yes I Need Someone", "The Clown", "Captive in the Sun", "Mr. Guy Fawkes","Someone Is Sure To (Want You)", "Morning Glory", "Magic Carpet", "Let Me Stay"	—	—
1969	King Curtis	Instant Groove: Released: June 1969 (US); Label: Atco (SD 33-293)	"Instant Groove"	127 (Note: Instant Groove also reached No. 37 on the Billboard R&B chart.)	—
1969	Fat Mattress	Fat Mattress: Released: August 15, 1969 (UK), August 1969 (US); Label: Polydor (583 056), Atco (SD 33-309)	"How Can I Live" (percussion)	134	—
1970	Timothy Leary	You Can Be Anyone This Time Around: Released: April 1970 (US); Label: Douglas (1)	"Live and Let Live" (bass)	—	—
"—" denotes a release that did not chart.

=== Singles as sideman ===
Year	Artist	Title	Peak chart positions		Posthumous Hendrix album
Year	Artist	Title	US R&B	US	Posthumous Hendrix album
1964	The Isley Brothers	"Testify, Part I" / "Testify, Part II": Released: June 1964 (US); Label: T-Neck (45-501)	—	—	West Coast Seattle Boy: The Jimi Hendrix Anthology
1964	Don Covay & the Goodtimers	"Mercy, Mercy" / "Can't Stay Away": Released: August 1964 (US); Label: Rosemart (45-801)	—	35	West Coast Seattle Boy: The Jimi Hendrix Anthology
1965	Frank Howard & the Commanders	"I'm So Glad" / (not on B-side): Released: 1965 (US); Label: Barry (1008)	—	—	West Coast Seattle Boy: The Jimi Hendrix Anthology
1965	Rosa Lee Brooks	"My Diary" / "Utee": Released: June 1965 (US); Label: Revis (1013)	—	—	West Coast Seattle Boy: The Jimi Hendrix Anthology
1965	The Isley Brothers	"Move Over and Let Me Dance" / "Have You Ever Been Disappointed": Released: September 1965 (US); Label: Atlantic (45–2303)	—	—	West Coast Seattle Boy: The Jimi Hendrix Anthology
1965	Little Richard	"I Don't Know What You've Got but It's Got Me, Part I" / "I Don't Know What You've Got but It's Got Me, Part II": Released: October 1, 1965 (US); Label: Vee-Jay (VJ-698)	12	92	West Coast Seattle Boy: The Jimi Hendrix Anthology
1965	Little Richard	"Dancing All Around the World" (Note: "Dancing All Around the World" is also known as "Dancin' All Over the World" and "Dance A Go Go") / "What You've Got" ("I Don't Know..."): Released: October 1, 1965 (US); Label: Vee-Jay (VJ-698) (Note: "Dancing All Around the World" (with the title "Dance A Go Go") was apparently released on a Vee-Jay promo single as the B-side to an edited "I Don't Know What You've Got but It's Got Me" (titled "What You've Got"), but with the same catalogue number as the "I Don't Know..." single; it later appeared on Little Richard albums.)	—	—	West Coast Seattle Boy: The Jimi Hendrix Anthology
1966	Ray Sharpe with the King Curtis Orchestra	"Help Me (Get the Feeling), Part I" / "Help Me (Get the Feeling), Part II": Released: Spring 1966 (US); Label: Atco (45–6402)	—	—	West Coast Seattle Boy: The Jimi Hendrix Anthology
1966	Curtis Knight	"How Would You Feel" / "Welcome Home": Released: April 1966 (US); Label: RSVP (1120)	—	—	You Can't Use My Name: The RSVP/PPX Sessions
1966	Lonnie Youngblood	"Go Go Shoes" / "Go Go Place": Released: After June 1966 (US); Label: Fairmount (F-1002)	—	—	none
1966	The Icemen	"(My Girl) She's a Fox" / "(I Wonder) What It Takes": Released: Late 1966 (US); Label: Samar (S-111)	—	—	West Coast Seattle Boy
1966	Jimmy Norman	"You're Only Hurting Yourself" / "That Little Old Groovemaker": Released: Late 1966 (US); Label: Samar (S-112)	—	—	West Coast Seattle Boy
1966	Curtis Knight and the Squires	"Hornet's Nest" / "Knock Yourself Out": Released: Late 1966 (US); Label: RSVP (758)	—	—	You Can't Use My Name
1967	Lonnie Youngblood	"Soul Food (That's a What I Like)" / "Goodbye Bessie Mae": Released: 1967 (US); Label: Fairmount (F-1022)	—	—	none
1967	Jayne Mansfield	(not on A-side) / "Suey": Released: 1967 (UK); Label: London (HL 10147)	—	—	none
1967	Curtis Knight	"You Don't Want Me" / "How Would You Feel": Released: August 11 & 17, 1967 (UK); Label: London (5.620), Track (604 009)	—	—	You Can't Use My Name
1967	Curtis Knight	"Hush Now" / "Flashing": Released: October 10, 1967 (UK); Label: London (HL 10160)	—	—	none
1968	Billy Lamont	"Sweet Thang" / "Please Don't Leave": Released: 1968 (US); Label: 20th Century Fox Records (6707)	—	—	West Coast Seattle Boy
1969	Curtis Knight	"Day Tripper" / "Love, Love": Released: 1969 (NL); Label: London (FLX 3224)	—	—	none
1969	Eire Apparent	"Rock 'n' Roll Band" / "Yes I Need Someone": Released: March 21, 1969 (UK), 1969 (US); Label: Buddah (201039), Buddah (2011–117)	—	—	none
1969	King Curtis	"Instant Groove" / (not on B-side): Released: 1969 (US); Label: Atco (6680)	35	127	West Coast Seattle Boy
"—" denotes a release that did not chart.

== See also ==
- Jimi Hendrix videography

== Notes ==
Footnotes

Citations

References

- Experience Hendrix. "Jimi Hendrix Encyclopedia". JimiHendrix.com (official website). Experience Hendrix. Archived from the original on February 12, 2009.
- McDermott, John; Kramer, Eddie (1992). Hendrix: Setting the Record Straight (1st ed.). New York City: Warner Books. ISBN 0-446-39431-9.
- McDermott, John; Kramer, Eddie; Cox, Billy (2009). Ultimate Hendrix. Milwaukee, Wisconsin: Backbeat Books. ISBN 978-0-87930-938-1.
- McDermott, John (2010). West Coast Seattle Boy: The Jimi Hendrix Anthology (CD/DVD set booklet). Jimi Hendrix. New York City: Legacy Recordings. OCLC 762162961. 88697769272.
- Roby, Steven; Schreiber, Brad (2010). Becoming Jimi Hendrix. Cambridge, Massachusetts: Da Capo Press. ISBN 978-0-306-81910-0.
- Shadwick, Keith (2003). Jimi Hendrix: Musician (1st ed.). San Francisco: Backbeat Books. ISBN 0-87930-764-1.
- Shapiro, Harry; Glebbeek, Cesar (1991). Jimi Hendrix: Electric Gypsy (1st US ed.). New York City: St. Martin's Press. ISBN 0-312-05861-6.
- Whitburn, Joel (1988). Top R&B Singles 1942–1988. Menomonee Falls, Wisconsin: Record Research. ISBN 0-89820-068-7.
- Whitburn, Joel (2008). Joel Whitburn Presents: Across the Charts – The 1960s. Menomonee Falls, Wisconsin: Record Research. ISBN 978-0898201758.
