= Jimi Hendrix videography =

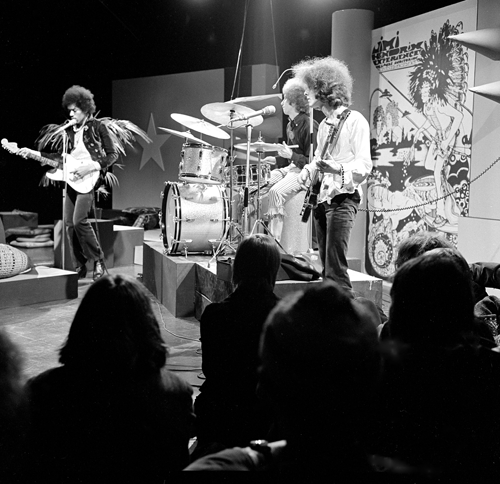
- The Jimi Hendrix Experience performing for Netherlands television in 1967
- Concert films: 10
- Documentaries: 14
- Music performances in other films: 7

Jimi Hendrix (1942–1970) was an American guitarist and singer-songwriter whose career spanned from 1962 to 1970. He appeared in several commercially released films of concerts and documentaries about his career, including two popular 1960s music festival films – Monterey Pop (1968) and Woodstock (1970). A short documentary, Experience (1968), also known as See My Music Talking, was also screened.

At the time of his death, two concert films were in development. Jimi Plays Berkeley (1971) was the first film featuring Hendrix to be issued posthumously. A second, tentatively titled The Last Experience, was filmed of the Jimi Hendrix Experience's last British concert. However, legal difficulties have prevented its release. Additionally, a theatrical film, with incidental music and 17 minutes of Hendrix's performing, was released as Rainbow Bridge (1971). In 1973, the first attempt at a biographical documentary film, titled Jimi Hendrix was released.

Over the years, many concert films and documentaries have been forthcoming. In addition to full-length performances at Monterey and Woodstock, Hendrix's 1970 concerts at the Isle of Wight and the Atlanta International Pop Festivals have been released on video. DVD releases of several of these and the earlier films have been certified as "Gold" and "Platinum" in several countries. The 2013 documentary Hear My Train A Comin' received an Emmy Award in 2014.

== Concert films ==
List of concert films with year, title, details, director, and sales certifications
Year	Title	Details	Songs	Certifications (sales thresholds)	Refs
1971	Jimi Plays Berkeley	Location: Berkeley Community Theatre, Berkeley, California; Date: May 30, 1970; Director: Peter Pilafian; Re-released with additional material (2003)	"Johnny B. Goode"; "Hear My Train A Comin'"; "The Star-Spangled Banner"; "Purple Haze"; "I Don't Live Today"; "Hey Baby (New Rising Sun)"; "Lover Man"; "Machine Gun"; "Voodoo Child"	Platinum (2003 DVD US)	
1985	Johnny B. Goode	Location: Atlanta International Pop Festival, Byron, Georgia; Date: July 4, 1970; Director: Alan Douglas	"All Along the Watchtower"; "The Star-Spangled Banner"; "Johnny B. Goode" (from Berkeley 1970); "Are You Experienced?" (promo film); "Voodoo Child (Slight Return)" (choreographed)		
1987	Jimi Plays Monterey	Location: Monterey Pop Festival, Monterey, California; Date: June 18, 1967; Director: D. A. Pennebaker; Re-released as Live at Monterey (2007)	See Jimi Plays Monterey album		
1990	Jimi Hendrix: At the Isle of Wight	Location: Isle of Wight Festival 1970, East Afton Farm, Isle of Wight; Date: August 30, 1970; Director: Murray Lerner; Remade as Blue Wild Angel: Live at the Isle of Wight (2002)	"Message to Love"; "God Save the Queen"; "Sgt. Pepper's Lonely Hearts Club Band"; "Spanish Castle Magic"; "All Along the Watchtower"; "Voodoo Child"; "Freedom"; "Machine Gun"; "Dolly Dagger"; "Red House"; "In from the Storm"		
1992	Jimi Hendrix: At the Atlanta Pop Festival	Location: Atlanta International Pop Festival (1970), Byron, Georgia; Date: July 4, 1970; Director: Remade as Jimi Hendrix: Electric Church (2015)	"Fire"; "Spanish Castle Magic"; "All Along the Watchtower"; "Foxy Lady"; "Purple Haze"; "Hey Joe"; "Red House"; "Stone Free"; "The Star Spangled Banner"; "Voodoo Child"		
1999	Jimi Hendrix at Woodstock	Location: Woodstock Music & Art Fair, Bethel, New York; Date: August 18, 1969; Director: Alan Douglas; Remade as Live at Woodstock (2005)	See Woodstock album	Gold (US)	
2002	Blue Wild Angel: Live at the Isle of Wight	Location: Isle of Wight Festival 1970, East Afton Farm, Isle of Wight; Date: August 30, 1970; Director: Murray Lerner; Remake of Jimi Hendrix: At the Isle of Wight with additional material	See Blue Wild Angel: Live at the Isle of Wight album	Platinum (US); Gold (AUS)	
2005	Live at Woodstock	Location: Woodstock Music & Art Fair, Bethel, New York; Date: August 18, 1969; Director: Janie Hendrix, John McDermott; Remake of Jimi Hendrix at Woodstock with additional material	See Live at Woodstock album	4× Multi-platinum (US); Platinum (AUS)	
2007	Live at Monterey	Location: Monterey Pop Festival, Monterey, California; Date: June 18, 1967; Director: D. A. Pennebaker; Remake of Jimi Plays Monterey with additional material	See Live at Monterey album	Gold (US)	
2015	Jimi Hendrix: Electric Church	Location: Atlanta International Pop Festival, Byron, Georgia; Date: July 4, 1970; Director: John McDermott; Remake of Jimi Hendrix: At the Atlanta Pop Festival with additional material	See Freedom: Atlanta Pop Festival album		

== Documentaries ==
List of documentaries with year, title, details, director, and sales certifications
Year	Title	Details	Songs	Certifications (sales thresholds)	Refs
1968	Experience a.k.a. See My Music Talking	Locations and dates: various, including Opera House, Blackpool, England (November 25, 1967); Bruce Fleming Photo Studio, London (December 19, 1967); Director: Peter Neal; Re-released as Experience Jimi Hendrix with additional material (2001)	"Purple Haze"; "Wild Thing"; "Hear My Train A Comin'"		
1973	Jimi Hendrix	Locations and dates: various; Director: Joe Boyd; Re-released with additional material (2005)	See Soundtrack Recordings from the Film Jimi Hendrix album		
1989	Jimi Hendrix	Program: The South Bank Show, Season 13, Episode 3 (October 1, 1989); Locations and dates: various			
1997	Jimi Hendrix: Electric Ladyland – Classic Albums	Locations and dates: various, including A Happening For Lulu (January 4, 1969); Director: Roger Pomphrey; Re-released as At Last... The Beginning (2008)	"Voodoo Child"		
1999	Hendrix: Band of Gypsys Live at the Fillmore East	Location: Fillmore East, New York City; Dates: December 31, 1969 – January 1, 1970	"Who Knows"; "Machine Gun"; "Changes"; "Power of Soul"; "Stepping Stone"; "Foxy Lady"; "Stop"; "Earth Blues"	Platinum (US)	
1999	Jimi Hendrix: The Man They Made God	Program: Reputations, Season 6, Episode 6 (June 5, 1999); Locations and dates: various; Director: Christopher Olgiati			
2001	Experience Jimi Hendrix	Location and dates: various, including Konserthuset, Stockholm, Sweden (January 9, 1969); Director: Peter Neal; Re-release of Experience with additional material	"Purple Haze"; "Wild Thing"; "Hear My Train A Comin'"; "The Wind Cries Mary"; "Purple Haze"; "Wild Thing"; "Red House"; "Sunshine of Your Love"; "Hey Joe"; "Dolly Dagger"	Platinum (US)	
2002	Jimi Hendrix: The Dick Cavett Show	Program: The Dick Cavett Show, Location: ABC Studios, New York City; Dates: July 7 & September 8, 1969; Director: Bob Smeaton	"Hear My Train A Comin'"; "Izabella"/"Machine Gun"		
2004	Jimi Hendrix: The Uncut Story	Location & dates: various; Director: Steve Vogel	Interviews only	Platinum (CAN)	
2006	Hendrix & the Blues a.k.a. Jimi Hendrix :Blues [sic]	Locations & dates: various; Director: Alex Gibney, Janie Hendrix, John McDermott	"Hear My Train A Comin'"; "Killing Floor"; "Voodoo Child"		
2008	At Last... The Beginning: The Making of Electric Ladyland	Locations and dates: various, including A Happening For Lulu (January 4, 1969); Director: Roger Pomphrey; Remake of Classic Albums with additional material	"Voodoo Child (Slight Return)"	Platinum (AUS)	
2010	Jimi Hendrix: Voodoo Child	Locations and dates: various; Director: Bob Smeaton	"Johnny B. Goode"; "Hear My Train A Comin'"; "Red House"; "Like a Rolling Stone"; "Purple Haze"; "The Wind Cries Mary"; "Killing Floor"; "Hey Joe"; "Fire"		
2013	Hear My Train a Comin'	Program: American Masters (November 6, 2013); Locations and dates: various; Director: Bob Smeaton	"Foxy Lady"; "Tax Free"; "Fire"; "Message to Love"; "Lover Man"; "All Along the Watchtower"; "Purple Haze"; "Voodoo Child (Slight Return)"; "Killing Floor"; "Spanish Castle Magic"; "Foxy Lady"; "Hey Joe"; "Purple Haze"		
2020	Music, Money, Madness ... Jimi Hendrix in Maui	Location: Upcountry Maui, Hawaii; Date: July 30, 1970; Director: John McDermott	See Live in Maui album		

== Music performances in other films ==
List of music performances in other films with year, title, details, director, and sales certifications
Year	Title	Details	Songs	Certifications (sales thresholds)	Refs
1968	Monterey Pop	Location: Monterey Pop Festival, Monterey, California; Date: June 18, 1967; Director: D. A. Pennebaker	"Wild Thing"		
1970	Woodstock	Location: Woodstock Music & Art Fair, Bethel, New York; Date: August 18, 1969; Director: Michael Wadleigh	"Star Spangled Banner"; "Purple Haze"; "Instrumental Solo" (a.k.a. "Villanova Junction")		
1971	Rainbow Bridge	Location: Vibratory Color/Sound Experiment, Olinda, Maui, Hawaii; Date: July 30, 1970; Director: Chuck Wein; Restored full-length film (2000)	"Hey Baby"/"In from the Storm"; "Foxy Lady"; "Hear My Train A Comin'"; "Voodoo Child"; "Purple Haze"; "The Star-Spangled Banner"	Gold (2000 DVD US)	
1977	The Day the Music Died	Location: New York Pop Festival, Randall's Island, New York; Date: July 17, 1970; Director: Bert Tenzer	"Foxy Lady"; "The Star-Spangled Banner"		
1988	Rock and Roll Greatest Years: 1967, Vol. 1	Programs: Beat-Club, Tienerklanken; Locations and dates: Marquee Club, London (March 2, 1967); Universal Studio, Waterloo, Belgium (March 7, 1967)	"Purple Haze"; "Hey Joe"; "Stone Free"		
1989	Superstars in Concert	Locations and dates: various; Director: Peter Clifton	"Hey Joe"; "Wild Thing"		
1997	Message to Love	Location: Isle of Wight Festival 1970, East Afton Farm, Isle of Wight; Date: August 30, 1970; Director: Murray Lerner	"Message to Love"; "Machine Gun"; "Voodoo Child"; "Foxy Lady"; "Purple Haze"		

== See also ==
- Jimi Hendrix discography
- Jimi Hendrix posthumous discography
- List of songs recorded by Jimi Hendrix

== Notes ==
Citations

References

- McDermott, John; Kramer, Eddie (1992). Hendrix: Setting the Record Straight. New York City: Warner Books. ISBN 978-0-446-39431-4.
- McDermott, John (2002). Blue Wild Angel: Live at the Isle of Wight (DVD booklet). Jimi Hendrix. Santa Monica, California: MCA Records. OCLC 806443759. 088 170 341-9.
- McDermott, John (2003). Jimi Plays Berkeley (DVD booklet). Jimi Hendrix. Santa Monica, California: MCA Records. OCLC 53712210. 80001172-09.
- McDermott, John (2005). Jimi Hendrix: Live at Woodstock (DVD booklet). Jimi Hendrix. Santa Monica, California: Geffen Records. OCLC 522747671. 80005283-09 DG02.
- McDermott, John (2008). At Last... The Beginning: The Making of Electric Ladyland (DVD booklet). The Jimi Hendrix Experience. Santa Monica, California: Geffen Records. OCLC 1020531601. 80012279-09.
- McDermott, John; Kramer, Eddie; Cox, Billy (2009). Ultimate Hendrix. New York City: Backbeat Books. ISBN 978-0-87930-938-1.
- McDermott, John (2010). West Coast Seattle Boy: The Jimi Hendrix Anthology (CD/DVD set booklet). Jimi Hendrix. New York City: Sony Music Entertainment. OCLC 762162961. 88697769272.
- Roby, Steven (2002). Black Gold: The Lost Archives of Jimi Hendrix. New York City: Billboard Books. ISBN 978-0-8230-7854-7.
- Roby, Steven; Schreiber, Brad (2010). Becoming Jimi Hendrix (1st ed.). Cambridge, Massachusetts: Da Capo Press. ISBN 978-0-306-81910-0.
- Shapiro, Harry; Glebbeek, Cesar (1990). Jimi Hendrix: Electric Gypsy (1st ed.). New York City: St. Martin's Press. ISBN 978-0-312-05861-6.
- Shadwick, Keith (2003). Jimi Hendrix: Musician (1st ed.). San Francisco: Backbeat Books. ISBN 0-87930-764-1.
