= Mercy, Mercy (Don Covay song) =

1964 song by Don Convay

- Rosemart single listing "Covay-Miller" as writers

Single by Don Covay and the Goodtimers

from the album Mercy!
- B-side: "Can't Stay Away"
- Released: August 1964
- Recorded: May 13, 1964
- Studio: A1 Sound, New York City
- Genre: Soul
- Length: 2:21
- Label: Rosemart
- Songwriters: Don Covay, Ronald Alonzo Miller
- Producer: Herb Abramson

Don Covay and the Goodtimers singles chronology
"The Froog" (1964)	"Mercy, Mercy" (1964)	"Take This Hurt Off of Me" (1964)

"Mercy, Mercy" (sometimes referred to as "Have Mercy") is a soul song first recorded by American singer/songwriter Don Covay in 1964. It established Covay's recording career and influenced later vocal and guitar styles. The songwriting is usually credited to Covay and Ron Alonzo Miller, although other co-writers' names have also appeared on various releases.

In late 1964, the song became a hit, reaching number one on the Cash Box R&B chart and number 35 on the Billboard Hot 100. Several other artists have recorded "Mercy, Mercy", including a well-known version by the Rolling Stones for their 1965 album Out of Our Heads. More recently, Covay's original version has received attention as one of Jimi Hendrix's first recordings as a sideman.

== Recording and composition ==
In 1964, after years of writing and recording songs for several record labels, Don Covay was again in search of a record deal. A recording session was arranged for May 13, 1964, at the A1 Recording Studio in New York City, operated by Atlantic Records co-founder Herb Abramson. New York radio station WWRL disc jockey Nathaniel "Magnificent" Montague provided financing for the session. Covay has given differing accounts about the recording. In one, "Mercy, Mercy" was recorded the day following a well-received performance by Covay and his band the Goodtimers the previous night. For the session, various members of the Goodtimers have been mentioned, including guitarist Ronald Alonzo Miller (also suggested as the bassist), backup singer George "King" Clemons, bassist Horace "Ace" Hall, drummer Bernard Purdie, guitarist Bob Bushnell, guitarist Jimmy Johnson, and a young Jimi Hendrix.

Music critic Richie Unterberger describes "Mercy, Mercy" as a "soul tune with a gospel overlay in the pleading tone of the lyrics". It opens with the refrain, sung by Covay with a higher-register harmony:

Have mercy, have mercy baby
Have mercy, have mercy on me (Note: The opening lyrics have led some to refer to the song as "Have Mercy")

Covay's vocal is described as "impassioned" and "assured". Music historian Peter Guralnick notes that the guitar part "established a new guitar dominated soul sound". It plays a prominent role, beginning with the chorded lead-in, which music writer Keith Shadwick describes as "rhythmic patterns that are tasteful modifications of the motifs favored by Curtis Mayfield and Jimmy Johnson – and there have been suggestions that it is Johnson himself on the record". Covay recalled that the song was recorded in one or two takes and additional single-note fills at the fade-out suggest a second guitarist or an overdub.

== Releases and charts ==
Rosemart Records released "Mercy, Mercy", with the artist name "Don Covay and the Goodtimers", as a single by in August 1964. Producer Abramson's former label Atlantic picked up the distribution and it entered the Billboard Hot 100 on September 5, 1964. The single reached number 35 during a stay of ten weeks on the chart. It was also a best seller in the R&B market, reaching number one on the Cash Box R&B chart (Billboard's R&B chart was suspended at the time).

An original pressing of the Rosemart single lists the composers as "Covay-Miller". The performing rights organization BMI shows the writers as "Donald Covay" and "Ronald Alonzo Miller". However, different releases list "Covay-Ott", including Covay's Mercy! album (Atlantic SD–8104) and the Atlantic UK single (AT.4006) (Horace Ott played keyboards on and is credited with several songs on Mercy!). Additionally, Miller is sometimes identified as "Ronald Norman Miller", a Motown composer, and "Ronald Dean Miller", a later R&B songwriter. BMI does not list "Mercy, Mercy" among Ott's or the other Miller's songwriting credits.

== Hendrix involvement ==
Beginning in 2002, it has become generally accepted that Jimi Hendrix contributed a guitar part to "Mercy, Mercy". According to backup singer Clemons:

Curtis Knight, Jimmy [Jimi Hendrix], and I all used to live in the same apartment building – around 81st Street [near the A1 Studio] ... Don Covay came around shopping for a record deal. He used to go down to the Harlem clubs looking for somebody to use ... on songs he was looking to sell to Atlantic [Records]. He'd say, 'I got this tune I want you to help me with ... come on down to the studio ... Can you sing this part? Can you play this part?'

Covay has sometimes identified Hendrix as a participant and at other times does not mention him. According to Hendrix biographer Steven Roby, Hendrix "arrived at A1 Studio [and] was asked to play a simple Curtis Mayfield-like R&B riff and not overstep his boundaries at the song's dramatic pause". However, Shadwick feels the song's guitarist "certainly enjoys a prominent role – and perhaps this does suggest a regular band-member performing a well-learned routine rather than a last minute substitution". Music writer David Malvinni describes Hendrix's performance: "Hendrix deftly combines chords with a melodic line in a style that later will come to full development in his classic 'Little Wing'".

According to Clemons, Hendrix performed "Mercy, Mercy" at several small clubs before Covay's single was released. Booker T. & the M.G.'s guitarist Steve Cropper recalled meeting Hendrix at the Stax Records studio in Memphis in 1964, when Hendrix mentioned that he had played on Covay's "Mercy, Mercy":

That about knocked me to my knees ... because that was one of my favorite records at the time. I hadn't worked with Don [Covay] yet, but I asked Jimi to show me that great lick he played. [Later] Jimi took my guitar and started playing that sucker upside down [Cropper played a right-handed guitar, while Hendrix played left-handed]. I laughed and told him, 'I can't learn that lick by looking at it that way'.

Cropper's recollection is supported by a 1968 Rolling Stone interview with Hendrix: "He [Cropper] showed me how to play lots of things and I showed him how I played 'Have Mercy' or something like that". Cropper later recorded an instrumental version of the song with Booker T. & the M.G.'s for their 1965 Soul Dressing album.

Hendrix performed "Mercy, Mercy" with Curtis Knight and the Squires in 1965. A live version with Knight on vocals, was recorded at George's Club 20 in Hackensack, New Jersey; it later appeared on the German bootleg album Mr. Pitiful (Astan 201019), released about 1981 with Curtis Knight manager Ed Chalpin listed as the producer. Hendrix also performed the song in 1966 with his band Jimmy James and the Blue Flames at the Cafe Wha? in Greenwich Village. In England later that year, Noel Redding recalled that it was one of the first songs that he played at his audition for the Jimi Hendrix Experience; it was also the first song performed during Mitch Mitchell's audition (Redding had initially auditioned with drummer Aynsley Dunbar).

During the Experience's first performances during a short tour of France in October 1966 and before they worked up some original material, they played the song along with a few other R&B cover songs during their 15-minute opening sets. A performance by the Experience at the Flamingo Club in London on February 4, 1967, was recorded and has been issued on several bootleg albums. Hendrix announces the song as "very straight Top-40 R&B rock 'n' roll record ... a little thing called 'Have Mercy' ... 'Have Mercy on Me, Baby'". The three and a half minute song features more elaborate and driving guitar work, although remains focused on chording.

== Rolling Stones version ==
"Mercy, Mercy"

Song by the Rolling Stones

from the album Out of Our Heads
- Released: July 30, 1965 (US); September 24, 1965 (UK)
- Recorded: May 10, 1965
- Studio: Chess, Chicago
- Genre: Rock, soul
- Length: 2:45
- Label: London (US); Decca (UK)
- Songwriters: Don Covay; Ronnie Miller
- Producer: Andrew Loog Oldham

The Rolling Stones recorded their interpretation of "Mercy, Mercy" during their early American recording sessions, when they were beginning to emerge from their blues- and R&B-cover band roots. Their first attempt came during their second session at the Chess Records studio in Chicago in November 1964. This version, which Malvinni calls "workmanlike", remains unreleased. On their third Chess visit, they recorded the final version of the song. The session took place on May 10, 1965, with engineer Ron Malo.

The Stones generally follow Covay's arrangement, but Unterberger notes the guitar work: "[they] really upped the guitar wattage, as heard in the memorable opening section of interwoven guitars and, more particularly, in the booming low fuzz guitar riffs that underpin the verses". Malvinni comments on the song's development since the first attempt:

[Guitarist Keith] Richards had absorbed the guitar part, and he gives an original, strident, and more improvisatory interpretation of the Hendrix part, and one with more rhythmic confidence than his first take on the song. In general, with a slightly overdriven (distorted) timbre and daring verve, Richards takes the song in the direction of rock.

Mick Jagger's vocal for the song has been compared to Covay's. AllMusic critic Steve Huey notes "[he] clearly modeled his vocal on Covay's original, which apparently had a lasting impact on the way Jagger subsequently used his voice". Guralnick calls Covay's style a "formative influence" on Jagger, who was "gaining confidence as a soul-rock vocalist".

The Stones' rendition of the song was not released as a single; however, it was used as the lead track on the American version of the band's Out of Our Heads album. Released on July 30, 1965, it became their first number one album in the US. The album, released in the UK on September 24, 1965, reached number two in the UK and includes the song as the second track. The group was filmed performing the song during their first appearance with Mick Taylor in Hyde Park on July 5, 1969, which was later included on the 2006 Stones in the Park expanded DVD.

== Notes ==
Footnotes

Citations

References

- Babiuk, Andy; Prevost, Greg (2013). Rolling Stones Gear: All the Stones' Instruments from Stage to Studio. Backbeat Books. ISBN 978-1-61713-092-2.
- Belmo; Loveless, Steve (1998). Jimi Hendrix: Experience the Music. Collector's Guide Publishing. ISBN 1-896522-45-9.
- Geldeart, Gary; Rodham, Steve (2007). Jimi Hendrix: The Studio Log. Jimpress Publications. ISBN 978-0-9527686-4-7.
- Guralnick, Peter (1999). Sweet Soul Music: Rhythm and Blues and the Southern Dream of Freedom. Little, Brown. ISBN 0-316-33273-9.
- Malvinni, David (2016). Experiencing the Rolling Stones: A Listener's Companion. Rowman & Littlefield. ISBN 978-0810889200.
- Margotin, Philippe; Guesdon, Jean-Michel (2016). The Rolling Stones All the Songs: The Story Behind Every Track. Black Dog & Leventhal Publishers. ISBN 978-0-316-31774-0.
- McDermott, John; Kramer, Eddie; Cox, Billy (2009). Ultimate Hendrix. Backbeat Books. ISBN 978-0-87930-938-1.
- McDermott, John (2010). West Coast Seattle Boy: The Jimi Hendrix Anthology (CD set booklet). Jimi Hendrix. Legacy Recordings. OCLC 663959495. 88697769272.
- Perry, John (2004). Electric Ladyland (33⅓ Series). Bloomsbury Publishing USA. ISBN 978-1441129598.
- Roby, Steven (2002). Black Gold: The Lost Archives of Jimi Hendrix. Billboard Books. ISBN 0-8230-7854-X.
- Roby, Steven; Schreiber, Brad (2010). Becoming Jimi Hendrix. Da Capo Press. ISBN 978-0-306-81910-0.
- Shadwick, Keith (2003). Jimi Hendrix: Musician. Backbeat Books. ISBN 0-87930-764-1.
- Shapiro, Harry; Glebbeek, Cesar (1990). Jimi Hendrix: Electric Gypsy. St. Martin's Press. ISBN 0-312-05861-6.
- Whitburn, Joel (1988). Top R&B Singles 1942–1988. Record Research. ISBN 0-89820-068-7.
