= Live Isle of Wight '70 =

Live album by Jimi Hendrix
- Released: 1991
- Recorded: August 31, 1970
- Venues: Isle of Wight Festival, Isle of Wight, England
- Genre: Rock
- Length: 62:06
- Label: Polydor
- Producer: Alan Douglas

Jimi Hendrix chronology
Stages (1991)	Live Isle of Wight '70 (1991)	The Ultimate Experience (1992)

Professional ratings
Review scores
Source	Rating
AllMusic	2.5/5 stars

Live Isle of Wight '70 is a posthumous live album by Jimi Hendrix released in 1991. It contains some of the songs from Hendrix's last U.K. live performance at the Isle of Wight Festival on August 31, 1970, three weeks before his death.

The set list for the concert contained songs from the original Experience albums, as well as newer songs. The album includes an eight-minute version of "Voodoo Chile" and a 12-minute version of "Machine Gun" that includes walkie-talkie interference from security personnel feeding through the sound equipment.

The album is the second Hendrix release with some material from the festival (Isle of Wight was issued in 1971) and has been superseded by the 2002 album Blue Wild Angel: Live at the Isle of Wight, which contains the complete performance.

== Track listing ==
All songs were written by Jimi Hendrix, except where noted.

1. "Intro/God Save the Queen" (Traditional) – 3:00
2. "Message to Love" – 6:26
3. "Voodoo Child" – 8:01
4. "Lover Man" – 3:25
5. "Machine Gun" – 12:37
6. "Dolly Dagger" – 5:32
7. "Red House" – 11:10
8. "In from the Storm" – 4:20
9. "New Rising Sun" – 7:31

== Personnel ==
- Jimi Hendrix – guitar, vocals
- Mitch Mitchell – drums
- Billy Cox – bass guitar
