= Live in Maui =

Live album by the Jimi Hendrix Experience
- Released: November 20, 2020
- Recorded: July 30, 1970
- Venue: Upcountry Maui, Hawaii
- Genre: Rock
- Length: 100:18
- Label: Experience Hendrix/Legacy
- Producer: Janie Hendrix; Eddie Kramer; John McDermott

Jimi Hendrix album chronology
| Songs for Groovy Children (2019) | Live in Maui (2020) | Los Angeles Forum: April 26, 1969 (2022) |

Live in Maui is an album by the Jimi Hendrix Experience documenting their performance outdoors on Maui, Hawaii, on July 30, 1970. It marks the first official release of Hendrix's two full sets recorded during the filming of Rainbow Bridge (1971). The two-CD and three-LP set was released on November 20, 2020, along with a video documentary titled Music, Money, Madness ... Jimi Hendrix in Maui.

Their performance on Maui was the trio's second-to-last in the U.S. during their final The Cry of Love Tour. During the first set, they played mainly songs from the Experience studio albums and Band of Gypsys. The second set mostly contains new songs Hendrix was in the process of recording for a planned fourth studio album.

== Background ==
Although both the 1971 Rainbow Bridge film and album are credited solely to Hendrix, Live in Maui is credited to the Jimi Hendrix Experience, with Mitch Mitchell on drums and Billy Cox on bass. Despite claiming to be a soundtrack, the Rainbow Bridge album did not include any of Hendrix's Maui performances. Several heavily edited songs totaling 17 minutes were first released with the Rainbow Bridge film. Additional songs were released on The Jimi Hendrix Experience box set (2000) (a medley of "Hey Baby" / "In from the Storm") and Voodoo Child: The Jimi Hendrix Collection (2001) ("Foxey Lady").

The trio performed two fifty-minute sets; however, there were technical problems partly due to the high winds in the unprotected former pasture. For the portions used in the film Rainbow Bridge, Mitchell re-recorded his drum parts at Electric Lady Studio in New York City in 1971, but Hendrix had no further input.

== Critical reception ==
In a review for AllMusic, Mark Deming noted the less-than-ideal recording conditions and added:

The Maui recordings don't find him [Hendrix] exploring much in the way of anything new, but he's in excellent form, playfully relaxed and fully engaged at the same time, and Mitch Mitchell's drumming is, as always, an excellent foil for Jimi's melodies and instrumental attack, while Billy Cox's subtle but solid bass anchors this music better than his predecessor, Noel Redding.

Hugh Fielder, writing for Classic Rock, also commented on the recording problems, which led to the Maui recordings being passed over for years in favor of Hendrix's performances at the Atlanta International Pop Festival (1970) (latest release Freedom: Atlanta Pop Festival, 2015) and Isle of Wight Festival 1970 (Blue Wild Angel, 2002). However, he noted that "[n]ow the latest digital audio technology has enabled them to be brought up to scratch (almost)" and gave the album three and a half out of five stars. But, he felt that "[t]he second set is looser and in danger of falling apart at times, before Hendrix wakes up and rips through "Stone Free".

== Track listing ==
Because of recording difficulties, the album sequencing differs somewhat from the actual performance. The first set opened with "Spanish Castle Magic" and "Lover Man" before "Hey Baby (New Rising Sun)" and "Message to Love" followed "In from the Storm". Mitchell re-recorded the drums parts in 1971 on "Hey Baby" (both sets), "In from the Storm", "Foxy Lady", "Hear My Train A Comin'" (first set), "Voodoo Child (Slight Return)", "Purple Haze", and "Star Spangled Banner"; the original drums parts are included on the balance.

All songs were written by Jimi Hendrix, except "Sunshine of Your Love", "Star Spangled Banner", and "Hey Joe".

Disc one
| No. | Title | Including parts of (Note: Over the years, Hendrix biographers have used alternate names for some of the songs and medleys. For example, "Hear My Train A Comin'" has been identified as "Getting My Heart Back Together"; "Villanova Junction" as "Instrumental Solo"; and the medley portions of "Midnight Lightning", "Hey Baby" (second set), "Drum Solo", and "Hey Joe" have not been listed separately.) | Length |
|---|---|---|---|
| 1. | "Chuck Wein Introduction" (spoken, no music) | | 1:47 |
| 2. | "Hey Baby (New Rising Sun)" | | 4:33 |
| 3. | "In from the Storm" | | 4:26 |
| 4. | "Foxey Lady" | | 4:40 |
| 5. | "Hear My Train A Comin'" | | 9:26 |
| 6. | "Voodoo Child (Slight Return)" | Drum solo | 7:12 |
| 7. | "Fire" | "Sunshine of Your Love" | 3:43 |
| 8. | "Purple Haze" | "Star Spangled Banner" | 4:32 |
| 9. | "Spanish Castle Magic" | | 4:16 |
| 10. | "Lover Man" | | 2:42 |
| 11. | "Message to Love" | | 4:21 |
| Total length: | | | 51:34 |

Disc two
| No. | Title | Including parts of | Length |
|---|---|---|---|
| 1. | "Dolly Dagger" | | 4:49 |
| 2. | "Villanova Junction" | | 5:49 |
| 3. | "Ezy Ryder" | | 5:05 |
| 4. | "Red House" | | 6:40 |
| 5. | "Freedom" | | 4:21 |
| 6. | "Jam Back at the House" | | 8:21 |
| 7. | "Straight Ahead" | | 3:03 |
| 8. | "Hey Baby (New Rising Sun)" / "Midnight Lightning" | | 4:52 |
| 9. | "Stone Free" | "Hey Joe" | 5:44 |
| Total length: | | | 48:44 |

== Personnel ==
- Jimi Hendrix – guitars, music and lyrics
- Mitch Mitchell – drums (original live and overdubs)
- Billy Cox – bass guitar

=== Production ===
- Eddie Kramer – producer, stereo and 5.1 mix engineer, drum overdubs recording engineer
- Janie Hendrix – producer
- John McDermott – producer, Blu-ray director, technical liner notes
- Mike Neal – remote recording, concert sound mixer
- Harry McCune Sound Service – concert sound equipment
- John Jansen – drum overdubs recording engineer
- Spencer Guerra – assistant engineer
- Chandler Harrod – 5.1 mix engineer
- Bernie Grundman – mastering
- Jeff Slate – liner notes
- Brian Byrnes – cover and booklet photography
- Daniel Teheney – jacket photography
- Phil Yarnall – art design
- Barry Gruber – photo research
- Steve Pesant – photo research

== Charts ==
Chart performance for Live in Maui
| Chart (2020) | Peak position |
|---|---|
| German Albums (Offizielle Top 100) | 44 |
| Japanese Albums (Oricon) | 49 |
| Swiss Albums (Schweizer Hitparade) | 38 |
| US Billboard 200 | 155 |
| US Top Rock Albums (Billboard) | 21 |
