= Band of Gypsys =

- Original Capitol Records cover

Live album by Jimi Hendrix
- Released: March 25, 1970
- Recorded: January 1, 1970
- Venues: Fillmore East, New York City
- Genres: Rock; psychedelic funk; funk rock; psychedelic rock
- Length: 45:16
- Labels: Polydor/Track (UK); Capitol (US); Barclay (France)
- Producer: Jimi Hendrix (listed as Heaven Research)

Jimi Hendrix US chronology
Smash Hits (1969)	Band of Gypsys (1970)	Historic Performances (1970)

Jimi Hendrix UK chronology
Electric Ladyland (1968)	Band of Gypsys (1970)	The Cry of Love (1971)

Band of Gypsys is a live album by Jimi Hendrix and the first without his original group, the Jimi Hendrix Experience. It was recorded on January 1, 1970, at the Fillmore East in New York City with R&B musicians Billy Cox on bass and Buddy Miles on drums, a grouping frequently referred to as the Band of Gypsys. The album mixes funk and R&B elements with Hendrix's psychedelic rock guitar and wah-wah pedal-based jamming, an approach which later became the basis of funk rock. It contains previously unreleased songs and was the last full-length Hendrix album released before his death six months later.

After his appearance at Woodstock with an interim group that included Cox, Hendrix began developing new songs and recording demos. When Miles became involved, he and Cox agreed to record a live album with Hendrix to be used to settle a contract dispute with a former manager. The new material signaled a new funk-influenced direction for Hendrix featuring more humanistic lyrical themes. The two songs written and sung by Miles bear the stylings of soul music. The anti-riot and anti-war "Machine Gun" draws on Hendrix's earlier blues aspirations, but incorporates new approaches to guitar improvisation and tonal effects.

As the album's producer, Hendrix struggled with the sometimes problematic recordings and expressed dissatisfaction with the final product. Shortly after its release, Band of Gypsys reached the top 10 of the album charts in the US and UK as well as appearing in charts in several other countries. Although it was as popular as his albums with the Experience, it received mixed reviews. Some faulted the performances as tentative and underprepared; additionally, Miles' drum and vocal contributions have been characterized as plodding and obtrusive. "Machine Gun" is generally regarded as the album's highlight and one of Hendrix's greatest achievements.

The influence of Band of Gypsys is heard in the funk rock developments of the 1970s and has been cited as an inspiration by various later rock musicians. Reissues of the album on compact disc included three extra songs recorded during the Fillmore East shows, and additional material has been released on later albums.

== Background ==
In 1969, Jimi Hendrix was under pressure from his manager and record company to record a follow-up to his hugely successful 1968 album Electric Ladyland. He was also required to produce an album's worth of new material for Capitol Records in order to satisfy a contract dispute with former manager Ed Chalpin and PPX Enterprises. Capitol had released two misleading Chalpin-produced Curtis Knight albums with Hendrix on guitar, which competed directly with his own Experience albums. Additionally, Hendrix was becoming increasingly dissatisfied with bassist Noel Redding and the Experience format. During the recording of Electric Ladyland, he and producer Chas Chandler parted ways and Hendrix began to explore recording with other musicians and different musical styles. By the middle of the year, he had not completed any promising material and Reprise Records resorted to issuing his April 1968 UK compilation album, Smash Hits, with some new tracks for the North American market. A concert film of a performance at the Royal Albert Hall in London in February 1969 was entangled in legal disputes and its release was uncertain. In May, while en route to a performance in Toronto, Hendrix was detained and charged with illegal possession of narcotics. If convicted of the felony, he faced as many as 20 years in prison. On June 28, 1969, Hendrix announced he planned to work with new musicians, including a new bass player. The next day, after a potentially life-threatening riot following a concert in Denver, Colorado, Redding left the group to return to London and the Jimi Hendrix Experience came to an end.

Hendrix then began experimenting with an expanded lineup for a limited number of American engagements. In addition to original Experience drummer Mitch Mitchell, he worked with bassist Billy Cox and second guitarist Larry Lee, as well as percussionists Juma Sultan and Gerardo "Jerry" Velez. Cox and Lee were two musicians with whom he had played in R&B bands in Tennessee in 1962, shortly after his stint in the US Army. The aggregation, often referred to as "Gypsy Sun and Rainbows", performed as the final act at the Woodstock Festival on August 18, 1969 (while introducing the group at Woodstock, Hendrix added "It's nothing but a band of gypsies"). (Note: Buddy Miles and Shapiro refer to the group as "Gypsy Sons and Rainbows".) After a couple more appearances, including a September 8 episode of the late night American television The Dick Cavett Show without Lee and Velez, the ensemble disbanded. Lee returned to Tennessee, Sultan and Velez left to pursue other opportunities, and Mitchell joined Jack Bruce's touring group.

In October 1969, Hendrix and Cox began jamming and recording demos with drummer Buddy Miles. Miles had played with various R&B and soul musicians, as a member of the Electric Flag and fronting the Buddy Miles Express, both blues rock-R&B fusion groups. Miles was also a frequent jam partner of Hendrix and had played the drums the year before on the two-part song "Rainy Day, Dream Away"/"Still Raining, Still Dreaming" for Electric Ladyland. Cox and Miles expressed an interest in performing and recording a new album with Hendrix. Hendrix's manager, Michael Jeffery, saw the opportunity to record a New Year's performance at the Fillmore East for a live album and the trio began preparing for the upcoming concerts and new album. Between then and the end of December, the trio rehearsed at Juggy Sound Studios and recorded several demos at the Record Plant Studios in New York City, where Hendrix recorded much of Electric Ladyland. After Hendrix's December 10, 1969, acquittal in his Canadian trial, the trio rehearsed their material at Baggy's Studios up until their first concert appearance on December 31. In an interview, Hendrix explained, "We spent 12 to 18 hours a day practicing this whole last week, straight ahead, and then we went into a funky little club and jammed down there to test it out". Early versions of some of the songs which eventually appeared on Band of Gypsys from two of the rehearsal sessions were released as The Baggy's Rehearsal Sessions by Dagger Records in 2002.

== Musical style, writing, composition ==
As a new group, the Band of Gypsys needed to develop a repertoire. Several songs that had begun as ideas, jams, and demos with the Experience and Gypsy Sun and Rainbows (but unreleased) were carried over to the Band of Gypsys. These included "Lover Man", "Hear My Train A Comin'", "Izabella", "Machine Gun", "Bleeding Heart", "Stepping Stone", and "Message to Love". (Note: The original Capitol album listed the song titles as "Power to Love" and "Message of Love". However, Track (UK), Barclay (France), and others used "Power of Soul" and "Message to Love". Reissues, including in the US, and in literature, they are usually referred to as "Power of Soul" and "Message to Love"; in 1997, Message to Love was used as the title for the documentary film of Isle of Wight Festival 1970, which included some of Hendrix's last performances on The Cry of Love Tour. Hendrix often used alternate names for his songs—during the Fillmore performances, he introduced "Power" as "Crash Landing" and "Paper Airplanes".) Three new songs featuring vocals by Buddy Miles were added: "Changes", "We Gotta Live Together" (both Miles compositions) and "Stop", an R&B song written by Jerry Ragovoy and Mort Shuman, which had been recorded by Howard Tate in 1968. Hendrix contributed new material as well, including "Power of Soul", "Ezy Ryder", "Earth Blues", "Burning Desire", and the riff for the jam song "Who Knows". The trio began rehearsing a set of songs for the four upcoming Fillmore shows.

Many of these songs represented a change in Hendrix's music from his Experience repertoire. Biographer and later Hendrix producer John McDermott elaborates:

Hendrix's new songs made clear the emerging shifts in his musical direction. The titles alone—"Message to Love", "Power of Soul", "Earth Blues", "Burning Desire"—suggest a change in theme. Jimi's playful humor ... had been replaced with a strident sense of self-examination. In addition, Cox and Miles spurred Jimi's embrace of the R&B tradition they shared [and] merged rock and funk with unparalleled ease.

Most of the arrangements were developed through extensive jamming, with Cox's and Miles' playing influencing Hendrix's ideas. According to biographer Keith Shadwick, Cox explained in later interviews, "the process was based on building up rhythm patterns and that each pattern dictated the shape and character of a portion of a song in which it appeared". Record producer Alan Douglas witnessed the approach during a jam at the Record Plant and saw it as inefficient. On the other hand, Shadwick feels that it was necessary: "it seemed the only way available, especially as neither Cox nor Miles, in particular, were exactly swift on the musical uptake". Music journalist Charles Shaar Murray noted, "Cox's funky, uncluttered bass style would give Hendrix's new music a more solid, less frenetic underpinning [than Noel Redding's style]. In every way, Cox's function would be to provide the steadiness Hendrix so urgently required". Soft Machine drummer Robert Wyatt described Miles' style as "pleasantly messy ... He wasn't as tight as a Stax drummer [such as Al Jackson Jr. ] ... his rolls would clatter about a bit". However, his often described "fatback grooves" laid down a solid rhythmic foundation and the combination of Cox and Miles added a "heavy, rolling fluidity which brings out a very different dimension in Hendrix's playing".

The mix of improvisation with R&B and funk elements is evident in "Who Knows", which was the opening song for the second (after the brief "Auld Lang Syne") and third shows. It is a loose jam rather than a structured composition and during the performance for the second show Hendrix teases the audience with "I hope you don't mind us jamming a little bit, we're just messing around ... seeing what we're gonna play next". Built on Hendrix's guitar figure, "Who Knows" is framed by Cox's economical funk-blues bass line and Miles' steady drum beat, which Murray describes as "a thick, lazy twitch". Hendrix explores guitar phrases using different tones and effects between vocal sections. According to Cox, Hendrix was using a new combination of effects for the first time. These included a Uni-Vibe phase shifter, an Octavia (developed for him by Roger Mayer during the recording of his first album), a Fuzz Face distortion box, and a wah-wah pedal. One mixture of them produces a "whistling, shimmering, ring-modulated tone so rich with upper harmonics" in the higher range, while in the lower range "it almost sounds like Froggy Went a-Courtin' ... all these [lower] oct[ave]-intervals give it such a dramatic effect". His use of the wah-wah employs "rapid foot movement and wide sweeps [which] tend to make the melody fade in and out". Also, by using a triplet rhythm with the pedal, a polyrhythm with the prevailing 4/4 beat is created. The lyrics, some of which borrow from other R&B songs, are also improvised and show considerable differences between the two renditions. As it unfolds, there is an R&B-style vocal call and response section between Hendrix and Miles, then separate vocal sections for each, which Miles follows with scat singing. During the middle section, most of the instrumentation drops out and returns with more Hendrix guitar tonal explorations before winding down at 8:23 (second show) and 9:32 (third show). (Note: The 3:55 version of "Who Knows" included on Live at the Fillmore East is edited from 8:23 second show version, which had microphone problems.) While McDermott feels that the jam is underdeveloped and biographer Harry Shapiro criticizes Miles' vocals, Shadwick and writer David Henderson focus on the "easy groove" and "lilting flow". Besides adding a fresh rhythmic element to his music, it also gives Hendrix more room to experiment with different approaches and sounds on guitar.

Similarly, the Buddy Miles song "We Gotta Live Together" is a jam piece. It forms the second part of a medley with "Voodoo Child (Slight Return)" and had only been performed once before at the Baggy's rehearsal room. The song features Miles attempting to engage the audience in a call and response "testifying" soul music-style vocal section, which was mostly edited out for the album release. Hendrix and Cox back Miles' vocal sections with parallel funk-style lines, before a guitar solo using Hendrix's new combination of effects. Shapiro comments:

At that point, it picks up into double-time and the sounds of electronic equipment not yet invented stream out of Jimi's Stratocaster at breakneck speed. Coming after the kind of stuff Jimi could play in his sleep, the contrast is even more startling. The passage is quite short, but it has an eerie abstract quality.

"Changes" is another song written and sung by Miles and it benefits from more development and structure. Although it includes a prominent guitar line by Hendrix, it is Miles' showcase piece. The song was performed during each show with little variation, except for Miles' vocal improvisations. With these sections edited out, "Changes" is a relatively concise, soul music radio-friendly track. When Miles re-recorded it as "Them Changes", it became a Billboard top 40 Best Selling Soul Singles as well as appearing in the magazine's Hot 100 pop chart.

The two Hendrix compositions, "Power of Soul" and "Message to Love", are also more structured and rehearsed songs. They represent Hendrix's new blending of funk, R&B, and rock together with a new lyrical approach. According to Shapiro, the lyrics reflect "a Jimi Hendrix who felt an increasing need to impart his compassionate vision of human potentiality [and a] move away from cynicism and bitterness". Cox and Miles provide strong instrumental backing, where the rhythm is "locked-in" or "deep in the pocket", a common feature of funk and R&B. (Nearly all of Hendrix's music, and contemporary rock in general, uses common or 4/4 time; "Manic Depression" (3/4 or 9/8), "Stepping Stone" (8/8), and the slow blues "Red House" and "Belly Button Window" (both 12/8) are among the exceptions.) Jazz innovator Miles Davis felt that Cox and Miles were the best rhythm section for Hendrix and freed him from the constraints of the Experience. Guitarist Jean-Paul Bourelly, who played with Davis, commented in an interview:

Band of Gypsys was the ultimate in terms of what he [Hendrix] was doing. I thought the rhythm section was perfect for him. Billy Cox and Buddy Miles—those were two cats who could hit. I mean, it was so solid that when Hendrix went into his psychedelic stuff it was like a perfect contrast. You could see how far he was traveling because the ground was so clear!

Machine Gun
29 seconds with sustained note at beginning of solo

"Machine Gun" is another song that Hendrix had spent time developing. By the Fillmore East concerts, it had become an extended guitar improvisational piece, which "would completely change the perception of Hendrix's capabilities as an improviser and musician", according to Shadwick. Although based on a "minor drone-blues" in the line of "Voodoo Child (Slight Return)", Hendrix's performance has been compared to jazz saxophonist John Coltrane's approach to improvisation. Miles Davis, with whom Coltrane had recorded several albums in the 1950s, including the influential Kind of Blue, noted the connection: "Jimi liked what I had done with Kind of Blue and some other stuff and wanted to add more jazz elements to what he was doing. He liked the way Coltrane played with all those sheets of sound, and played his guitar in a similar way". As indicated by Hendrix's dedication of the song "to all the soldiers that are fighting in Chicago and Milwaukee and New York, oh yes, and all the soldiers fighting in Vietnam", "Machine Gun" is as much about the late 1960s American race riots as the war in Vietnam. Guitarist Vernon Reid describes it as "like a movie about war without the visuals. It had everything—the lyrics, the humanism of it, the drama of it, the violence of it, the eeriness of it, [and] the unpredictability of it". In many commentaries about Band of Gypsys, "Machine Gun" is singled out as the highlight of the album. Both McDermott and Shadwick call it one of Hendrix's greatest achievements, setting a standard that the rest of the album does not live up to.

== Recording ==
The material for Band of Gypsys was recorded over two consecutive nights at the Fillmore East. The group was scheduled for two shows on December 31, 1969, and another two on January 1, 1970 (because the shows went beyond midnight, the actual dates were December 31 – January 1 and January 1–2; for ease of reference, these are referred as the first show, second show, third show, and fourth show). The recording was supervised by Wally Heider, an experienced sound engineer who ran a recording studio and had made several live recordings. He had already recorded Hendrix live several times, including at the Monterey Pop Festival in 1967 and Woodstock in 1969. Portable recording equipment was set up at the venue and the trio performed for a soundcheck in the afternoon. (Note: A Fillmore East staffer later recalled that the band had rehearsed there during the afternoons for several days, although McDermott places these rehearsals at Baggy's.)

Concert promoter Bill Graham billed the performances as "Jimi Hendrix: A Band of Gypsys", but Hendrix's new direction since the breakup of the Experience six months earlier had not been publicized. With a new lineup and material, Cox observed, "We didn't know what to expect from the audience and the audience didn't know what to expect from us". 24 different songs were performed over the four shows, for a total of 47 recorded versions. (Note: With medleys, Jucha counts 23 different and 11 new songs.) The group did not prepare set lists or otherwise plan for their performances. McDermott notes, "Hendrix called out tunes to Miles and Cox and would often make time and tempo changes on the fly, alerting his partners with a simple head nod or raising of his guitar neck". Miles also saw improvisation as a key element of their approach. According to Shadwick, the first show was essentially a warm-up set and they performed eleven new songs (it was the only show not to include any familiar Experience songs). There were some microphone problems during the first two songs, which re-appeared for the first two songs of the second show as well. Hendrix also experienced tuning problems with his guitar. His heavy use of the Stratocaster's whammy bar (vibrato arm) stretched the strings and led to pitch problems which he was often forced to correct mid-song. For the second show, in addition to new songs, Hendrix added "Stone Free", "Foxey Lady", "Voodoo Child (Slight Return)", and "Purple Haze".

On the second night, the group performed a mix of new and older material for the third and fourth shows. The contrast between the first and second nights has been noted by Hendrix biographers. Based on interviews with Cox and Miles, concert reviews, and film footage, McDermott and Shadwick conclude that Hendrix was less animated during the third and fourth shows, when he stood mostly in place until the final encores, seemingly concentrating on recording. In frequent interviews and in his autobiography, Bill Graham claimed that his own criticism of Hendrix's delivery to the audience (although he seems to confuse which shows) had spurred him on. However, according to McDermott, Hendrix was determined to deliver the standard of recording performances that would provide an album that would settle the bitter legal dispute with Ed Chalpin. All of the six songs that were chosen for the Band of Gypsys album were recorded on the second night during the third and fourth shows. After the main set, Hendrix played for his last encores "Wild Thing", "Hey Joe", and "Purple Haze".

== Production ==
On January 12, 1970, Hendrix and recording engineer Eddie Kramer began the task of deciding which songs to include on the new album (Cox and Miles did not participate in the process). The review and subsequent audio mixing was undertaken at Juggy Sound Studios in New York, where the trio had started rehearsing in October. Excluding Experience and cover songs, there were multiple versions of thirteen new, previously unreleased songs from which to choose. Among those that received Kramer's and Hendrix's attention were "Machine Gun", "Earth Blues", "Burning Desire", "Ezy Ryder", "Who Knows", and "Hear My Train A Comin'". Early on, Hendrix chose to include the Buddy Miles songs "Changes" and "We Gotta Live Together". He also decided on "Power of Soul" and "Message to Love", studio versions of which had been considered for release as a single (these studio recordings were later included on South Saturn Delta and West Coast Seattle Boy: The Jimi Hendrix Anthology). Songs with recording problems and those Hendrix wished to complete as studio recordings were withheld (studio versions of "Izabella" and "Stepping Stone" were released as a single in March; "Ezy Ryder" and "Earth Blues" were included on his first posthumous albums).

By January 21, Hendrix and Kramer narrowed the list to "Message to Love" (fourth show), "Hear My Train A Comin'" (first show), "Power of Soul" (third and fourth shows), and all four recordings of "Machine Gun". Hendrix and Kramer began preparing mixes of the multitrack recordings. During the process, Kramer recalled:

Mixing the Band of Gypsys album was a challenge. It was like Jimi was really almost pressured into doing it. Hearing Buddy's [vamping or musical improvisation] seemed to bother him. We were sitting there and he was like. 'Oh man, I wish Buddy would shut the fuck up.' He would listen to him and say, 'Can we cut some of those parts out?' I ended up editing a lot of Buddy's quote unquote 'jamming', where he would go off and sing a lot.

One of Miles' songs, "We Gotta Live Together", was pared down from fifteen to a little over five minutes and "Changes" was also trimmed, because, as Murray puts it, "a little of [Miles' vamping] goes an extremely long way". This editing also provided some lighter moments. One of Jeffery's assistants recalled, "Hendrix played me a tape and prefaced it by saying it represented the new direction in his music. He had made up this long loop of tape of the portions edited out of 'We Gotta Live Together'. I flipped out and he started cracking up". After several more editing and mixing sessions at Juggy Sound, the material for the album was readied on February 17. The following day, Hendrix and Kramer met with Bob Ludwig, who supervised the final mastering. Hendrix chose to work with his own mastering engineer because he had been dissatisfied with his record company's results on Electric Ladyland. The task was completed on February 19, 1970, and the final track listing included two songs from the third show and four from the fourth and last show.

According to Shadwick, "The process of choosing and mixing the live album was not a pleasant one: Hendrix only fulfilled his legal obligation to PPX/Capitol under duress and with the greatest reluctance". McDermott questions why some arguably superior tracks that Hendrix recorded were not used instead. Kramer sees it as a compromise:

I don't know that Jimi felt that these concerts were his best performances, but there were parts of them that he was really happy with. Certainly, 'Machine Gun' and tracks like 'Message to Love' sounded pretty good. At the time he didn't want to include new songs that he wanted to finish in Electric Lady [Hendrix's new custom-built recording studio]. Jimi was kind of resigned to the fact that here we are, we have to mix this, we got to give it to Capitol, it wasn't a Warner's record [his official record company], let's do the best we can with it.

Early on, Billy Cox believed that the primary goal was to resolve the matter with Chalpin. Later, he commented, "Overall, the feeling was, 'What the heck, the album doesn't belong to us anyway. Let's just move on and forget it'". Already past the 1969 deadline, Hendrix summed it up:

I wasn't too satisfied with the album. If it had been up to me, I never would have put it out. From a musician's point of view, it was not a good recording and I was out of tune on a few things ... not enough preparation went into it and it came out a bit 'grizzly'. The thing was, we owed the record company an album and they were pushing us, so here it is.

== Release ==
On February 25, 1970, Michael Jeffery delivered the master tapes for Band of Gypsys to Capitol Records executives in Los Angeles. Capitol rush-released the album one month later on March 25, and it entered Billboard's Top LPs chart at number eighteen. It reached number five during a stay of 61 weeks on the chart and, at the time of his death, was Hendrix's best selling album in the US since Are You Experienced. Due to legal wrangling by Ed Chalpin and PPX, the album was not released in the UK for nearly two more months. When Track Records issued it on June 12, 1970, it quickly entered the British charts, where it remained for 30 weeks and reached number six.

Original Track Records Band of Gypsys album cover (front)

For the album cover, Capitol Records used a grainy photograph of Hendrix taken during the Fillmore East shows illuminated by the multi-colored liquid light show projected by the Joshua Light Show. However, Track used album cover art which proved controversial, as they had done with Electric Ladyland. It depicted puppets or dolls that resembled Hendrix, Brian Jones, Bob Dylan, and John Peel huddled next to a drab, corrugated backdrop. The significance of posing the three with Hendrix was not evident as they had no known association with the Band of Gypsys nor the group's material. Hendrix was an admirer of Dylan and recorded some of his songs; Jones, who had died the year before, had participated in a recording session for Hendrix's "All Along the Watchtower" (a Dylan composition); and Peel had hosted BBC's Top Gear radio show when Hendrix performed there in 1967. Jeffrey remarked, "If ever there is an award for the worst taste album cover it must go to this". Responding to pressure, Track later replaced it with a photograph of Hendrix performing at the August 1970 Isle of Wight Festival.

By the time of the album's release, the trio had already broken up. Their first show after the Fillmore East engagement was at the Madison Square Garden on January 28, 1970. There they struggled through "Who Knows" and "Earth Blues" before leaving the stage. Jeffery, who reportedly was never happy with the lineup, fired Buddy Miles on the spot. Gerry Stickells, Hendrix's tour manager, points to "Jimi's own lack of commitment to the Band of Gypsys concept as its fatal flaw". Two songs, "Stepping Stone" and "Izabella", that the trio had recorded, were issued as a single by Reprise Records two weeks after Capitol released Band of Gypsys. Hendrix was dissatisfied with the mix and the single was quickly withdrawn without ever appearing in the charts. Three other songs that were recorded with Cox and Miles were later used for early posthumous Hendrix albums, including The Cry of Love and Rainbow Bridge. Additional studio recordings by the trio in various stages of development were released on South Saturn Delta, The Jimi Hendrix Experience box set, Burning Desire, West Coast Seattle Boy, and People, Hell and Angels.

== Critical reception ==
Retrospective professional reviews
Review scores
Source	Rating
AllMusic	4.5/5 stars
Blender	2/5 stars
Christgau's Record Guide	B+
Encyclopedia of Popular Music	3/5 stars
The Great Rock Discography	8/10
MusicHound Rock	4/5
Music Story	3.5/5 stars
Rolling Stone	4/5 stars
The Rolling Stone Album Guide	4/5 stars
Sputnikmusic	4.5/5

Band of Gypsys has been viewed by some rock critics less favorably than Hendrix's three studio albums with the Experience. According to writer Jeremy Wells, "critics have usually seen the Band of Gypsys' one album as the least significant of the [four] recordings Hendrix released during his lifetime". Reviewing for Rolling Stone in 1970, music journalist Gary von Tersch said that the album was hampered by poorly recorded vocals and Miles' unpleasant drumming, and instead viewed it as a showcase for Hendrix's virtuosic guitar playing: "With just bass and drum support he is able to transfuse and transfix on the strength of his guitar-work alone." The magazine's David Wild was more enthusiastic in a retrospective review and felt that songs such as "Message of Love" and "Machine Gun" still sounded powerful in spite of the unclear recording quality.

According to Sean Westergaard of AllMusic, Band of Gypsys is one of the best live albums of all time and an important recording for Hendrix, who played with a remarkable degree of focus and precision on what were "perhaps his finest [live] performances." Sputnikmusic's Hernan M. Campbell believed that it departed from his more psychedelic recordings with the Jimi Hendrix Experience, but still retained their intensity, particularly on "Machine Gun", which Campbell called one of Hendrix's most captivating performances. On the other hand, Robert Christgau felt that the "overrated" album was decent by live rock standards, but unexceptional in Hendrix's discography. Christgau also believed that Hendrix was limited by the straighter, simpler rhythm section, but added that "Who Knows" and "Machine Gun" "are as powerful if not complex as anything he's ever put on record". He stated that Hendrix was more reliant on wah-wah guitar lines for the second half of the album, except for the "rapid fire" "Message to Love".

== Influence and legacy ==
Writer Rickey Vincent describes Band of Gypsys as "a never-heard-before amalgam of punishing guitar riffs over crisp rhythm and blues grooves ... The funk-rock sound would change the face of black music, setting a template for the spectacular glam-funk of the 1970s". Murray sees their influence in the early 1970s radio hits "Freddie's Dead" by Curtis Mayfield and "That Lady" by the Isley Brothers. (Hendrix was influenced by Mayfield early in his career and was a member of the Isley Brothers' touring band before the Experience). George Clinton and Parliament-Funkadelic, who defined funk for the 1970s, were also influenced. P-Funk's "Maggot Brain", a ten-minute guitar opus by Eddie Hazel, draws on "Machine Gun" and bassist Bootsy Collins identified Hendrix as a chief innovator in the liner notes to his What's Bootsy Doin'? album. Later funk-influenced artists Larry Blackmon (singer for Cameo) and Nile Rodgers (guitarist for Chic and record producer) also cite the album's importance and influence.

In addition to funk rock, Murray sees the Band of Gypsys as "tread[ing] an intriguing path along the common border between hard funk and heavy metal; less psychedelic soul than black rock". Vernon Reid (guitarist for Living Colour) and Ice-T (singer for Body Count) have commented on the Band of Gypsys as an early influence. Trey Anastasio, guitarist for Phish, commented that "I remember, like many guitarists, being obsessed with Hendrix’s Band of Gypsys. It was the record. I listened to that solo on 'Machine Gun' a million times". During interviews in the 1999 documentary Band of Gypsys: Live at the Fillmore East, Reid, Velvert Turner, Slash, and Lenny Kravitz discuss "the inspiration and continuing influence that Band of Gypsys has provided".

During the Band of Gypsys rehearsals in November 1969, Hendrix and Miles recorded the backing track for "Doriella Du Fontaine", with Lightnin' Rod (later known as Jalal Mansur Nuriddin) of the Last Poets. Although it was not released until 1984, McDermott cited it as " a pristine example of Hendrix's embrace of hip-hop during that music form's infancy". Writer Gene Santoro describes it as "foreshadow[ing] the rap-meets-metal crossover of later artists like Run-DMC". In 1990, the alternative hip hop group Digital Underground extensively sampled "Who Knows", the opening song from Band of Gypsys, for "The Way We Swing" on the Sex Packets album. McDermott concludes that it would be difficult "to accurately measure the lasting impact Band of Gypsys has made on rock, funk, R&B, and Hip-Hop".

In 2018, the original Capitol Band of Gypsys album was inducted into the Grammy Hall of Fame, which "honor[s] recordings of lasting qualitative or historical significance". On June 23, 2019, the Band of Gypsys were inducted into the Rhythm and Blues Music Hall of Fame, at the Charles H. Wright Museum of African-American History in Detroit, Michigan. Billy Cox, the last surviving member of the group was on hand to accept, along with representatives of the Buddy Miles and Hendrix estates.

== Track listing ==
All tracks were written by Jimi Hendrix, except "Changes" and "We Gotta Live Together" by Buddy Miles, and "Stop" by Jerry Ragovoy and Mort Shuman.

Side one
No.	Title	Lead vocals	Length
1.	"Who Knows" (3rd show)	Jimi Hendrix, Buddy Miles	9:34
2.	"Machine Gun" (3rd show)	Hendrix, Miles	12:38

Side two
No.	Title	Lead vocals	Length
1.	"Changes" (4th show)	Miles	5:11
2.	"Power to Love [sic]" (4th show)	Hendrix, Miles	6:55
3.	"Message of Love [sic]" (4th show)	Hendrix	5:24
4.	"We Gotta Live Together" (4th show)	Miles, Hendrix, Billy Cox	5:51

- Sides one and two were combined as tracks 1–6 on CD reissues.

1991 Polydor Europe and Japan CD bonus tracks
No.	Title	Lead vocals	Length
7.	"Hear My Train A Comin'" (1st show)	Hendrix	9:02
8.	"Foxy Lady" (3rd show)	Hendrix	6:33
9.	"Stop" (3rd show)	Miles	4:47

== Personnel ==
- Billy Cox – bass, vocals
- Jimi Hendrix – guitar, vocals, producer, liner notes
- Buddy Miles – drums, vocals

Production personnel

- Jan Blom – photographer
- Wally Heider – live recording engineer
- Victor Kahn – album cover designer
- Eddie Kramer – studio mixing engineer
- Bob Ludwig – mastering engineer

== Charts and certifications ==
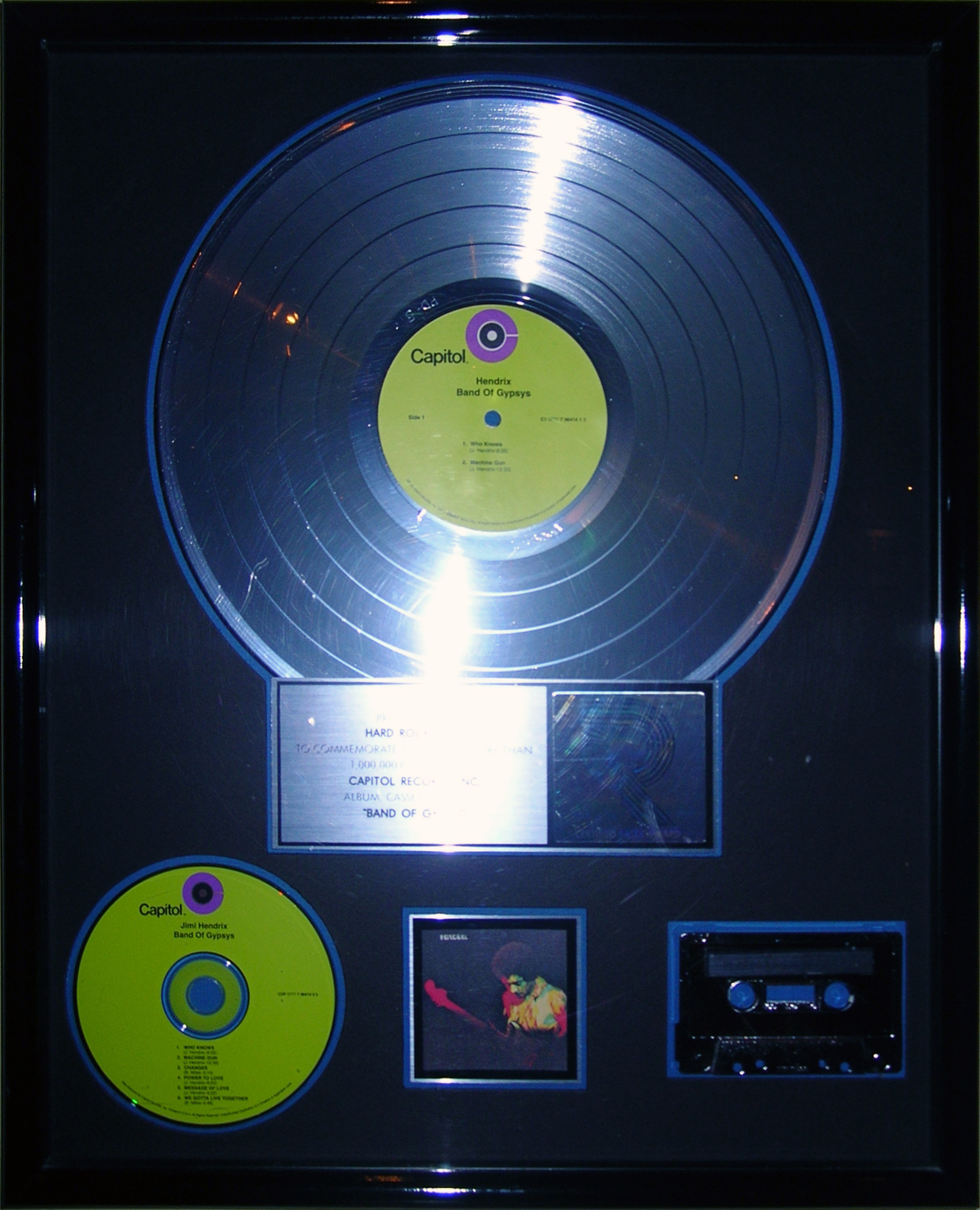
RIAA Platinum record for Band of Gypsys on display at the Los Angeles-Universal City Hard Rock Cafe (Note: RIAA Gold and Platinum award records usually do not use the actual record; in this case, the displayed record shows banding for five tracks, not two or four as would be the case with this album.)

Chart performance for Band of Gypsys
Chart (1970)	Peak position
Australia (GoSet Top 20 Albums)	4
Canada (RPM 100 Albums)	5
Germany Charts	15
Netherlands Charts	7
Norway Charts	9
UK (Official Charts)	6
US (Billboard Top LPs)	5
US (Best Selling Soul LP's)	14

In the US, the Recording Industry Association of America (RIAA) first certified Band of Gypsys as a "Gold Record", signifying sales in excess of 500,000 copies, on June 3, 1970, less than two months after its release. On February 5, 1991, it achieved "Platinum Record" status (more than one million copies sold). After Capitol Records re-released the album on CD in 1997, it was given a "Double Platinum" award on January 16, 1998, for sales over two million. Additionally, the 1999 Live at the Fillmore documentary DVD has received a platinum award.

== Release history ==
Band of Gypsys was re-released on compact disc in 1991 by Polydor Records in Europe and Japan. In addition to the original tracks, it included three extra songs recorded during the Fillmore East shows: "Hear My Train A Comin'" from the first show and "Foxy Lady" and the Jerry Ragovoy and Mort Shuman song "Stop", both from the third show. These had been originally released in the US by Capitol Records in 1986 on the Band of Gypsys 2 album (despite the title, only half of the album's songs were recorded with Cox and Miles). In 1997, when Band of Gypsys was re-released on CD in the US, Capitol only included the original six tracks.

After Experience Hendrix, a family-managed company, assumed control of his recording legacy, more material from the Fillmore shows has been issued. A longer version of "We Gotta Live Together", along with "Hear My Train", "Stop", and other songs are included on the 1999 double CD Live at the Fillmore East. "Foxy Lady" was added to one version of the 2013 "Somewhere" single. An additional three songs from the second Fillmore show are included on West Coast Seattle Boy. In 2016, the first show was issued as Machine Gun: The Fillmore East First Show. The box set Songs for Groovy Children: The Fillmore East Concerts, released in 2019, contains 43 songs from all four shows. In addition to new recordings, it presents longer versions of "Changes", "Power to Love" (as "Power of Soul"), and "We Gotta Live Together".

The trio was filmed performing two of the songs that are included on the original album. Black and white footage for part of "Who Knows" was filmed by Woody Vasulka from the hall, while Jan Blom shot "Machine Gun" from the balcony. It was later included on the 1999 DVD documentary Band of Gypsys: Live at the Fillmore East.

== Notes ==
Footnotes

Citations

References

- Billboard (August 8, 1970). "Best Selling Soul LP's". Billboard. Vol. 82, no. 32. New York City. ISSN 0006-2510.
- Billboard (April 24, 1971). "Best Selling Soul LP's". Billboard. Vol. 83, no. 17. New York City. ISSN 0006-2510.
- Black, Johnny (1999). Jimi Hendrix: The Ultimate Experience. New York City: Thunder's Mouth Press. ISBN 1-56025-240-5.
- Christgau, Robert (1981). Rock Albums of the '70s: A Critical Guide. Da Capo Press. ISBN 0-306-80409-3.
- Christgau, Robert (2005). "Back Catalogue: Jimi Hendrix". Blender (December). New York City.
- Davis, Miles (1990). Miles: The Autobiography (1st Touchstone ed.). New York City: Simon & Schuster. ISBN 0-671-63504-2.
- Evans, Paul; Brackett, Nathan (2004). "Jimi Hendrix". In Brackett, Nathan; Hoard, Christian (eds.). The New Rolling Stone Album Guide (4th ed.). Simon & Schuster. pp. 374–75. ISBN 0-7432-0169-8.
- Experience Hendrix (1998). Experience Hendrix: The Best of Jimi Hendrix Transcribed Scorres. Milwaukee, Wisconsin: Hal Leonard. ISBN 978-0-7935-9144-2.
- Fricke, David (2016). Machine Gun: The Fillmore East First Show (CD notes). Jimi Hendrix. New York City: Legacy. OCLC 980707580. 8898534162.
- Henderson, David (1981). 'Scuse Me While I Kiss the Sky: The Life of Jimi Hendrix (Bantam ed.). New York City: Bantam Books. ISBN 0-553-01334-3.
- Jucha, Gary J. (2013). Jimi Hendrix FAQ: All That's Left to Know About the Voodoo Child. Backbeat Books. ISBN 978-1-61713-095-3.
- McDermott, John; Kramer, Eddie (1992). Hendrix: Setting the Record Straight (1st ed.). New York City: Warner Books. ISBN 0-446-39431-9.
- McDermott, John; Cox, Billy; Kramer, Eddie (1995). Jimi Hendrix: Sessions (1st ed.). Boston, Massachusetts: Little, Brown. ISBN 0-316-55549-5.
- McDermott, John (1997a). Band of Gypsys (CD reissue booklet). Jimi Hendrix. Hollywood, California: Capitol Records. OCLC 224432346. 72434-93446-2-4.
- McDermott, John (1997b). South Saturn Delta (CD booklet). Jimi Hendrix. Universal City, California: MCA Records. OCLC 173217099. MCAD-11684.
- McDermott, John (1999). Live at the Fillmore East (CD booklet). Jimi Hendrix. Universal City, California: MCA Records. OCLC 42332285. MCAD2-11931.
- McDermott, John (2000). The Jimi Hendrix Experience (Box set booklet). Jimi Hendrix Experience. Universal City, California: MCA Records. OCLC 852836848. 08811 23162.
- McDermott, John (2002). The Baggy's Rehearsal Sessions (CD booklet). Jimi Hendrix. Santa Monica, California: Dagger Records. OCLC 51115044. 088 112 956-2.
- McDermott, John (2006). Burning Desire (CD booklet). Jimi Hendrix. Santa Monica, California: Dagger Records. OCLC 217131894. CATF-0520S-2.
- McDermott, John; Kramer, Eddie; Cox, Billy (2009). Ultimate Hendrix. Milwaukee, Wisconsin: Backbeat Books. ISBN 978-0-87930-938-1.
- McDermott, John (2010). West Coast Seattle Boy: The Jimi Hendrix Anthology (CD set booklet). Jimi Hendrix. New York City: Legacy. OCLC 822580228. 88697769272.
- McDermott, John (2013). People, Hell and Angels (CD booklet). Jimi Hendrix. Legacy. OCLC 861691834. 88765418982.
- Milkowski, Bill (July–August 2001). "Modern Jazz – Axis: Bold as Jimi". JazzTimes. 31 (6). ISSN 0272-572X.
- Moskowitz, David (2010). The Words and Music of Jimi Hendrix. ABC-CLIO. ISBN 978-0-313-37592-7.
- Murray, Charles Shaar (1991). Crosstown Traffic (1st paperback ed.). New York City: St. Martin's Press. ISBN 0-312-06324-5.
- Needs, Kris (2014). George Clinton & the Cosmic Odyssey of the P-Funk Empire. Music Sales. ISBN 978-1-78323-037-2.
- Roby, Steven (2002). Black Gold: The Lost Archives of Jimi Hendrix. New York City: Billboard Books. ISBN 0-8230-7854-X.
- Santoro, Gene (1995). Dancing in Your Head: Jazz, Blues, Rock, and Beyond. Oxford University Press. ISBN 978-0-19-510123-2.
- Shadwick, Keith (2003). Jimi Hendrix: Musician (1st ed.). San Francisco: Backbeat Books. ISBN 0-87930-764-1.
- Shapiro, Harry; Glebbeek, Cesar (1991). Jimi Hendrix: Electric Gypsy (1st US ed.). New York City: St. Martin's Press. ISBN 0-312-05861-6.
- Sinclair, David (1998). BBC Sessions (CD booklet). Jimi Hendrix Experience. Universal City, California: MCA Records. OCLC 558958926. MCAD2-11742.
- Vincent, Rickey (2013). Party Music: The Inside Story of the Black Panthers' Band and How Black Power Transformed Soul Music. Chicago Review Press. ISBN 978-1-61374-492-5.
- Wells, Jeremy (1997). "Blackness 'Scuzed". In Fossett, Judith Jackson; Tucker, Jeffrey A. (eds.). Race Consciousness: African-American Studies for the New Century. NYU Press. ISBN 0-8147-4228-9.
- Wheeler, Tom; Gore, Joe (1992). Fuzz, Feedback & Wah-Wah. Milwaukee, Wisconsin: Bella Godiva Music/Hal Leonard. ISBN 0-7935-1402-9.
- Whitburn, Joel (1988). Top R&B Singles 1942–1988. Menomonee Falls, Wisconsin: Record Research. ISBN 0-89820-068-7.
- Whitehill, Dave; Rubin, Dave (1992). Octavia & Univibe. Milwaukee, Wisconsin: Bella Godiva Music/Hal Leonard. ISBN 0-7935-1403-7.
