= You Can't Use My Name: The RSVP/PPX Sessions =

Compilation album by Curtis Knight and the Squires
- Released: March 24, 2015
- Recorded: 1965–1967
- Genre: Rhythm and blues, rock
- Length: 49:35
- Label: Legacy Recordings
- Producer: Janie Hendrix, Eddie Kramer, John McDermott

Curtis Knight and the Squires chronology
Flashing (1968)	You Can't Use My Name: The RSVP/PPX Sessions (2015)	Live at George’s Club 20 1965 & 1966 (2017)

You Can't Use My Name: The RSVP/PPX Sessions is a posthumous compilation album by Curtis Knight and the Squires. Except for "Gloomy Monday" (recorded in 1967), the album compiles recordings made by Knight in 1965 and 1966, with Jimi Hendrix providing backup guitar before he moved to England to start the Jimi Hendrix Experience. Knight wrote and sang all of the songs, except for four instrumentals, which are credited to Hendrix.

The title refers to Hendrix's stipulation to producer Ed Chalpin at the beginning of the 1967 session:

- Hendrix: Edward, can you hear me? In other words, like you can't, you can't use my name for any of this stuff, all right? ... no, serious though, seriously.
- Chalpin: Don't worry about it. I won't use it, don't worry about it.

Shortly thereafter, Chalpin licensed the recordings to Capitol Records, who issued an album titled Get That Feeling with billing as "Jimi Hendrix and Curtis Knight" in 1967. After Hendrix, his managers, and Reprise Records, his official American label, objected to the misleading billing and cover photo of Hendrix performing at the Monterey Pop Festival, Capitol issued a second album Flashing in 1968 billed as "Jimi Hendrix Plays, Curtis Knight Sings" with a sketch of Knight and Hendrix.

Chalpin subsequently licensed the recordings to dozens of minor record labels, who used them to issue well over one hundred purported "Jimi Hendrix" albums. To give the appearance of new material, the songs were often doctored by editing and overdubbing and given new names. Hendrix commented, "They [the Knight/Chalpin sessions] were nothing but jam sessions, man, with a group called the Squires. No, I didn't sing on 'Hush Now', that was dubbed on later by Knight trying to copy my voice."

After years of litigation, Experience Hendrix, a family company that has managed Hendrix's recording legacy since 1995, acquired the sole rights to the Knight/Chalpin/PPX material. According to producer/engineer Eddie Kramer, You Can't Use My Name presents the best available original recordings without the subsequent doctoring.

== Track listing ==
No.	Title	Writer(s)	Length
1.	"How Would You Feel"	Knight	3:50
2.	"Gotta Have a New Dress"	Knight, Samson Horton	3:07
3.	"Don't Accuse Me"	Knight	3:55
4.	"Fool for You Baby"	Knight	2:14
5.	"No Such Animal"	Hendrix	4:50
6.	"Welcome Home"	Knight	3:47
7.	"Knock Yourself Out (Flying on Instruments)"	Hendrix, Jerry Simon	6:54
8.	"Simon Says"	Knight	3:37
9.	"Station Break"	Hendrix, Simon	2:31
10.	"Strange Things"	Knight	2:56
11.	"Hornet's Nest"	Hendrix, Simon	5:09
12.	"You Don't Want Me"	Knight	2:21
13.	"You Can't Use My Name" (studio chatter)		0:57
14.	"Gloomy Monday"	Knight	3:32
Total length:			49:35
