= Rainbow Bridge (film) =

1971 film by Chuck Wein

- Directed by: Chuck Wein
- Written by: Charlie Bacis
- Produced by: Barry De Prendergast; Michael Jeffery
- Starring: Pat Hartley
- Cinematography: Vilis Lapenieks
- Music by: Jimi Hendrix
- Production company: Antahkarana Productions
- Distributed by: Transvue Pictures; Alcyone Releasing
- Release dates: 1971 (Aquarius Theatre, Hollywood)
- Running time: 125 minutes (original)
- Country: United States
- Language: English
- Budget: $700,000

Rainbow Bridge is a 1971 film directed by Chuck Wein centering on the late 1960s counterculture on the Hawaiian island of Maui. Filmed in summer 1970 with non-professional actors and without a script, it features largely improvised scenes with a variety of characters. To bolster the film, executive producer Michael Jeffery brought in his client Jimi Hendrix to film an outdoor concert. Hendrix's heavily edited (no complete songs) performance appears near the end of the film.

Rainbow Bridge was a critical failure and has been re-released on video tape and DVD formats. Although it only contains 17 minutes of Hendrix performing, it continues to attract attention as his second-to-last American concert and the last one filmed.

A documentary film, titled Music, Money, Madness ... Jimi Hendrix in Maui, about the making of Rainbow Bridge was released on November 20, 2020. It was accompanied by an album, Live in Maui, reported to include all of Hendrix's performances recorded during the filming.

== Background ==
Faced with a serious cash flow problem, Hendrix manager Michael Jeffery approached Reprise Records parent Warner Bros. with an idea for a youth film. He was able to secure a $450,000 advance with the promise of a soundtrack by Hendrix. While in Maui, Jeffery met Mike Hynson, star of The Endless Summer surf epic, and wanted to develop a film. With the proposed title Wave, it would be centered on the Maui countercultural community. Jeffery enlisted Chuck Wein, who had produced three Andy Warhol Factory films. Wein brought in Pat Hartley as the star, who had appeared in some of his films. Barry De Prendergast served as the film's producer, with Jeffrey as executive producer.

Wein envisioned Rainbow Bridge as "a kind of space-age Candid Camera. We're going to place Pat [New York model Pat Hartley, the protagonist] in all kinds of real-life situations, and film what happens. We're going to shoot a lot of film and just see what comes out of it." Harry Shapiro adds, "the idea was to shoot an antidote to Easy Rider, showing the positive side of the youth movement."

Wein and art director Melinda Merryweather "invited outrageous people to portray themselves in Rainbow Bridge. They included dope smugglers, priests and nuns, acidheads, gays, groupies, environmentalists, and a group who claimed to be from Venus", according to Hendrix biographer Steven Roby. Before long, Warner's advance was used up with little to show for it. Although there was no plan for a Hendrix concert, Jeffery decided that a filmed performance was needed to rescue his investment. Later record producer John Jansen recalled, "Jeffery had to talk Hendrix into performing. Up to that point, he had refused to write a note of music for the film."

== Plot ==
The loosely documentary-style film is centered on the experiences of a New York model, who travels from San Diego, California, to an occult center on the island of Maui, Hawaii. The occult center scenes were filmed at Seabury Hall. While there, "she encounters various devotees of surfing, clairvoyance, zen, yoga, meditation, tai chi and the odd ufoloist". As it unfolds, a free concert by Jimi Hendrix is staged in a former pasture in the upcountry region (2,000 feet above sea level) near Olinda, southeast of the center of the town of Makawao, on the northwest, upcountry slope of Haleakalā. A few hundred island hippies, surfers, and local residents show up to witness the event. Hendrix performed with the post–Jimi Hendrix Experience "Cry of Love" tour group, drummer Mitch Mitchell and bassist Billy Cox. A group of Hare Krishnas chanted "Om" for a few minutes and Wein introduced the group. Although Hendrix played two full sets (approximately 50 minutes each), due to technical problems, only about 17 minutes of film footage was deemed usable.

== Releases ==
Rainbow Bridge premiered at the Aquarius Theatre in Hollywood in the fall of 1971. The original length of the theatrical release was 123 minutes. However, it was soon edited to cut down on the acting scenes, with one version lasting 70 minutes. The 2000 re-release by Rhino Video restored the original full-length version. Although Wein claimed that all of the usable footage of Hendrix was included in the film, full-length performances of "Dolly Dagger" and "Villanova Junction" (both from the second set) have appeared on bootleg videos.

== Critical reception ==
The response to Rainbow Bridge is uniformly negative. Shadwick calls it "a snafu of impressive dimensions even for the hippie generation." He adds that it was "so drug-addled, pseudo-mystical and stuffed with narcissistic, self-important onscreen hippies that the only hope of saving it indeed was to put Hendrix on celluloid". Shapiro describes it as "a ludicrous farrago of pseudo-mystical acid babble devoid of sincerity ... Overall, the best thing that can be said about Rainbow Bridge is that, after seventy-one minutes, it finishes". Writing for AllMusic, critic Bruce Eder comments, "Hendrix plays some superb music in the concert sequence that concludes this documentary—the rest is all devoted to pre-new-age mumbo-jumbo at a Hawaiian retreat". Later Hendrix producer John McDermott calls it a "disastrous, embarrassing failure ... Jeffery's attempt to rescue his own personal finances via Hendrix's memory was disgraceful."

== Soundtrack ==
A soundtrack album, also titled Rainbow Bridge, was released in October 1971. Although it contains some incidental studio recordings by Hendrix used in the film, the album does not include any of the recorded performances from the Maui concert. Hendrix's performances are edited for the film. Live in Maui, an album containing both of the full sets (20 songs) was released on November 20, 2020.

Edited song performances included in the film (all from the first set, except where indicated):

- "Hey Baby"/"In from the Storm" (the complete recording appears on The Jimi Hendrix Experience box set)
- "Foxy Lady" (included on Voodoo Child: The Jimi Hendrix Collection)
- "Hear My Train A Comin'" – first part
- "Voodoo Child (Slight Return)"
- "Purple Haze"
- "Star Spangled Banner"
- "Hear My Train A Comin'" – second part
- "Hey Baby" (second set) – intro only
- "Ezy Ryder" (second set) – audio only

Snippets of several newer songs recorded by Hendrix are used as incidental music for the film, often under dialogue or ambient sounds. The full-length versions were released on the 1971 Rainbow Bridge album, except where indicated:

- "Earth Blues"
- "Dolly Dagger"
- "Bleeding Heart" (1972 War Heroes and 1997 South Saturn Delta)
- "Pali Gap"
- "Look Over Yonder"
- "Star Spangled Banner"
- "Room Full of Mirrors"
- "Hey Baby (New Rising Sun)"

The version of "Hear My Train A Comin'" that appears on the album was taken from the first show on May 30, 1970, at the Berkeley Community Theatre in Berkeley, California. In 2014, the original Rainbow Bridge album was reissued in both CD and LP formats.

== Notes ==
Citations

References

- Belmo; Loveless, Steve (1998). Jimi Hendrix: Experience the Music. Collector's Guide. ISBN 1-896522-45-9.
- Black, Johnny (1999). Jimi Hendrix: The Ultimate Experience. Thunder's Mouth Press. ISBN 1-56025-240-5.
- Cross, Charles R. (2005). Room Full of Mirrors: A Biography of Jimi Hendrix. Hyperion Books. ISBN 0-7868-8841-5.
- Loder, Kurt (2001). Voodoo Child: The Jimi Hendrix Collection (CD booklet). Jimi Hendrix. MCA Records. OCLC 46948620. 088 112 603-2.
- McDermott, John; Kramer, Eddie (1992). Hendrix: Setting the Record Straight. Warner Books. ISBN 0-446-39431-9.
- McDermott, John; Kramer, Eddie; Cox, Billy (2009). Ultimate Hendrix. Backbeat Books. ISBN 978-0-87930-938-1.
- McDermott, John (2000). The Jimi Hendrix Experience (Box set booklet). Jimi Hendrix Experience. MCA Records. OCLC 45231576. 08811 23162.
- Roby, Steven (2002). Black Gold: The Lost Archives of Jimi Hendrix. Billboard Books. ISBN 0-8230-7854-X.
- Shadwick, Keith (2003). Jimi Hendrix: Musician. Backbeat Books. ISBN 0-87930-764-1.
- Shapiro, Harry; Glebbeek, Cesar (1990). Jimi Hendrix: Electric Gypsy. St. Martin's Press. ISBN 0-312-05861-6.
