= Performances and adaptations of The Star-Spangled Banner =

Notable performances and renditions of "The Star-Spangled Banner"

As the national anthem of the United States, and even before its official adoption as the anthem, "The Star-Spangled Banner" has been performed by a variety of people using different arrangements, a range of instruments, and in many different styles. Specific renditions of "The Star-Spangled Banner" are notable for reasons such as unique musical arrangements, memorable mistakes and poorly-received performances, significant cultural or social impacts, distinctive performance styles, and frequent use in broadcasts.

== Background ==
Allusions to the tune appear in a number of classical works. For example, Richard Wagner's "American Centennial March", commissioned for the centennial of U.S. independence in 1876, appears to repeatedly quote part of the theme. Sergei Rachmaninoff arranged it for solo piano. The beginning of the song is also used in the beginning of the march titled "National Emblem". Giacomo Puccini used the opening notes as a motif throughout his opera Madama Butterfly. Frank Bridge's "The Pneu World" for cello and piano, H.163 (1925), is a parody on the opening bars of "The Star-Spangled Banner". The tune is the basis of the tone poem "Homage for Orchestra Op. 31" by James Cohn.

== Early notable recordings ==
Bing Crosby recorded the song on March 22, 1939, for Decca Records. He also recorded it as a reading of the poem with a musical accompaniment on August 15, 1946.

Igor Stravinsky's first of his four 1941 arrangements of "The Star-Spangled Banner" led to an incident on January 15, 1944, with the Boston police, but "Boston Police Commissioner Thomas F. Sullivan said there would be no action." "After Stravinsky conducted it with the Boston Symphony for the first time in 1944, the police informed the composer of a Massachusetts law against tampering with national property, and removed the parts from Symphony Hall." The incident soon established itself as a myth in which Stravinsky was supposedly arrested for playing the music.

Lucy Monroe sang the national anthem for every Opening Day and World Series held at Yankee Stadium from 1945 through 1960. Robert Merrill sang the national anthem at seven World Series games: at Game 3 of the 1976, 1978 and 1999 World Series, at the 1977, 1981 and 1996 World Series openers and at Game 2 of the 1998 World Series.

== Popular recordings ==
Three versions of "The Star-Spangled Banner" have made the Hot Country Songs charts. The first was an a cappella version by Ricochet, recorded for the Columbia Records album NASCAR: Hotter than Asphalt, which charted at number 58 in July 1996. Faith Hill's version, recorded at Super Bowl XXXIV in 2000, reached number 35 on the same chart, and number 18 on the Bubbling Under Hot 100 Singles in September 2001. A 2012 rendition by The Band Perry charted at number 59.

Beyoncé Knowles performed the anthem at Super Bowl XXXVIII at Reliant Stadium in Houston on February 1, 2004. The song entered the U.S. Hot Digital Tracks chart at No. 37.

On January 20, 2017, Jackie Evancho released Together We Stand, a disc containing three patriotic songs including "The Star-Spangled Banner". The song charted at No. 2 on Billboard's Classical Digital Song sales chart.

== Notable alternative arrangements ==
=== Early alternative interpretations ===
A controversial version was performed by José Feliciano at the 1968 World Series, a rendition that Feliciano has said negatively affected his career. His folk/blues approach did not sit well with everyone, but Detroit Tigers announcer Ernie Harwell, a musician in his own right, liked it and defended it (as noted in the CD collection Ernie Harwell's Audio Scrapbook.) José Feliciano's rendition was released as a single after his performance, peaking at #50 in 1968.

One of the most notable renditions of the anthem was Jimi Hendrix's solo guitar performance at the 1969 Woodstock Festival, captured on the documentary film of the event. Hendrix played the anthem with a number of distorted regressions—some mimicking the "rockets" and "bombs" of the anthem's lyrics—to great acclaim from the audience. It was voted 52nd on the list of the 100 greatest guitar solos of all time by readers of Guitar World Magazine. Hendrix also recorded a studio version of "The Star-Spangled Banner" some time before the Woodstock festival. That version features numerous guitar tracks played through octave-shifting effects. The studio version is available on the Rainbow Bridge album and Cornerstones collection.

=== Whitney Houston at Super Bowl XXV ===
After singer Whitney Houston's stirring performance of the anthem at Super Bowl XXV in 1991, her live version was released as a charity single to raise funds for soldiers (and their families) involved in the Persian Gulf War. The single reached #20 on the Billboard Hot 100. Its B-side was "America the Beautiful". The song's video consisted of Houston's performance at the Super Bowl.

The version was not released elsewhere until it appeared on Whitney: The Greatest Hits in 2000. It was later released in digital form, having seen increased sales in the aftermath of Houston's death on February 11, 2012.

After the September 11, 2001 attacks, Arista Records arranged a re-release of Houston's version of "The Star Spangled Banner" (again with "America the Beautiful" as the B-side), with all profits going to the firefighters and victims of the attacks. It peaked at #6 on the Hot 100 and was certified platinum by the Recording Industry Association of America. The two single releases of Houston's version marked the only times the anthem has ever appeared in the Top 40 of Billboard's pop singles chart.

=== Other alternative interpretations ===
The Mormon Tabernacle Choir's recorded version solved the range problem as any mixed choir might—with the male voices carrying the main melody in the lower part of the range and the female voices carrying the upper part of the range while the male voices provide lower-keyed harmony. This version also contains a rare singing of the fourth verse, in addition to the first.

Composer John Williams wrote two new arrangements, one for the 2003 Rose Bowl and the other for the opening game of the 2007 World Series.

R. Kelly performed the anthem with a soul arrangement at the 2005 Bernard Hopkins vs. Jermain Taylor boxing match. The performance caused some controversy, as it was accompanied by step dancers and Kelly told the audience to "clap your hands, y'all" (as if at a concert) during the anthem.

== Television broadcasting ==
In the early years of U.S. television broadcasts, it became common practice by many stations to close their broadcast day, usually late at night or early in the mornings, by airing "The Star-Spangled Banner" accompanied by an image of the flag or some other patriotic theme. One audio-visual arrangement entitled "National Anthem" was produced by a New York-based graphics firm, Saxton Graphic Associates, Ltd. The musical arrangement in this version, which may be found on the album America on the Move, was performed by the London Festival Orchestra in 1963, and arranged and conducted by Bob Sharples. It commences with a trumpet fanfare followed by images that illustrate several of the highlights of American history, culminating with an image from 1969 of an Apollo 11 astronaut standing on the Moon by the U.S. flag. Several television stations aired this version, including WNEW-TV in New York (through 1978) and Washington, D.C.'s WDVM-TV (Channel 9).

== Notable poor performances and changed lyrics ==
Canadian-born Robert Goulet forgot the lyrics when invited to sing the anthem before a Muhammad Ali championship in the 1960s.

At the 1989 World Series opener, the Yale Whiffenpoofs sang "still there" twice, in the process omitting the "O" that begins the next line. Until that point, several of the Whiffenpoofs sang the National Anthem while the other members backed them up by singing "America the Beautiful."

Perhaps the most notorious rendition of the national anthem was sung by comedian Roseanne Barr at a San Diego Padres baseball game in July 1990. Barr screeched the lyrics out loud (claiming that there was an audio problem) as the crowd heckled her and threw objects onto the field in her direction in disgust. She also made several gestures associated with baseball players (such as adjusting one's protective cup and spitting on the ground), which further drew widespread complaints, including those from President George H. W. Bush. Barr has not been asked to sing again at a baseball game since. Twenty-two years later, during Barr's Comedy Central Roast, she closed her routine by singing the lines of the anthem that were not sung during the infamous performance.

In 1993, Olympic gold medalist Carl Lewis attempted to sing "The Star-Spangled Banner" before a New Jersey Nets game. Lewis sang the entire song off-key and at a range too high for his voice. After his voice broke on the word "glare", he stopped and said "Uh oh", then said "I'll make up for it now" near the end of the song. He was widely ridiculed for the incident. ESPN SportsCenter anchor Charley Steiner described Lewis' version of the national anthem as being written by "Francis Scott Off-Key".

Singer John Amirante performed a stirring rendition of the Canadian and American national anthems before the New York Rangers' win over the Vancouver Canucks in game seven of the 1994 Stanley Cup Final. The National Hockey League and Major League Baseball require venues in both the U.S. and Canada to perform both "The Star-Spangled Banner" and "O Canada" (the Canadian national anthem) at games that involve teams from both countries. At interleague baseball games between the Toronto Blue Jays and Montreal Expos, only the Canadian anthem was played. When hockey legend Wayne Gretzky played his final game, Amirante changed the line of "O'er the land of the free" to "O'er the land of Wayne Gretzky" to reflect Gretzky's retirement.

Steven Tyler of Aerosmith was invited to sing the national anthem at the 2001 Indianapolis 500. His performance was widely criticized when after singing "free" he sang a kind of phrase leading into "bam-de-la-bam-bam," and he also he changed the lyrics of the last line from "the home of the brave" to "the home of the Indianapolis 500." Tyler also erred while singing the anthem at the 2012 AFC Championship Game between the New England Patriots and the Baltimore Ravens.

At the 2001 Pro Football Hall of Fame Game, Macy Gray was booed after stumbling over the words and singing offbeat.

Pop singer Anastacia performed the anthem before the 2002 MLB All-Star Game but sang "gave truth" instead of "gave proof". The game ended in a controversial 7–7 tie after 11 innings.

Before an April 25, 2003 NBA playoff game between the Portland Trail Blazers and the Dallas Mavericks, 13-year-old Natalie Gilbert forgot the words "At the twilight's last gleaming", and Trail Blazers coach Maurice Cheeks rushed over to help her and they finished it together, the entire Rose Garden Arena crowd accompanying them. Cheeks and Gilbert received a standing ovation after the song.

When performing the anthem before a game of the 2003 American League Championship Series at Fenway Park, singer Michael Bolton briefly forgot the lyrics and had to look at his hand, where he had apparently written them down for reference.

At a 2005 exhibition hockey game in Quebec City, Caroline Marcil, daughter of a past Hockey Québec president, forgot the words to the anthem, left to get printed lyrics and, as she returned, slipped on the ice and fell. Marcil was later invited to appear on Good Morning America, where she performed "The Star-Spangled Banner" correctly.

René Marie substituted the anthem's lyrics with those of "Lift Every Voice and Sing" at a Denver civic event in 2008.

Anita Baker was criticized for her performance of "The Star-Spangled Banner" at Game 4 of the 2010 NBA Finals.

At a December 5, 2010 NFL game between the Denver Broncos and the Kansas City Chiefs, the Eli Young Band botched the lyrics at the beginning of the third line of the song and was met with boos. They started over, but skipped from the end of the second line to the fifth line. Despite the second error, they sang the lyrics correctly.

Pop singer Christina Aguilera sang the anthem at Super Bowl XLV in February 2011, but changed the lyrics of the fourth line from "o'er the ramparts we watched were so gallantly streaming" to an alteration of the second line, "what so proudly we watched at the twilight's last gleaming". She later apologized, saying that "I got so lost in the moment of the song that I lost my place."

After the Supreme Court of the United States struck down the Defense of Marriage Act, Lady Gaga performed the anthem at New York City's gay pride parade on June 28, 2013, changing the last word to "gay".

Before Game 5 of the 2014 World Series, Staind lead singer Aaron Lewis omitted the words "at the twilight's last gleaming" when singing the anthem.

Singer Fergie drew criticism for her rendition of the anthem at the 2018 NBA All-Star Game.

At the 2024 MLB Home Run Derby, country artist Ingrid Andress sang the anthem completely off-key. She later issued a statement saying that she was "drunk" and that she would be "entering a treatment program to get the help she needs".
