= Lonnie Youngblood =

- Born: Lonnie Thomas; August 3, 1941 (age 84); Augusta, Georgia, United States
- Occupations: Saxophonist, bandleader
- Instrument: Saxophone
- Labels: All Platinum, Turbo Records

Lonnie Thomas (born August 3, 1941 in Augusta, Georgia), known as Lonnie Youngblood, is an American saxophonist and bandleader best remembered for playing with Jimi Hendrix.

== Biography ==
Youngblood's main influence is King Curtis, although his earliest influence was his mother's favorite artist Louis Jordan. In 1966 Youngblood played with Hendrix on some sessions with various singers for producer Johnny Brantley. Three of these sessions yielded the Youngblood singles "Goodbye, Bessie Mae"/ "Soul Food (That's What I Like)" and "Go Go Shoes" (Parts 1 & 2), and five singles by other artists. After Hendrix' death Brantley put together an LP from these sessions, including the two Youngblood singles, the other artists singles plus a couple of out-takes from these sessions, adding some new overdubs to "improve" the sound. All of the original vocals by the other artists were wiped, although they can be heard faintly in places, and there was no mention of them. None of the original artists were credited - apart from Youngblood - and the cover misleadingly featured a 1969 photo of Hendrix and Youngblood jamming on stage. The sleeve notes falsely claim that these were Hendrix earliest recordings made in 1963. This date has clearly been demonstrated to be false by earlyhendrix.com. He also worked from time to time in Curtis Knight & Hendrix' group Curtis Knight and the Squires. In 2010, Youngblood initiated a lawsuit against the Hendrix estate, MCA Records and film director Martin Scorsese, for their unauthorised use of what he claimed was his composition, "Georgia Blues", on the Jimi Hendrix album, Martin Scorsese Presents The Blues.

His first professional job was backing up Pearl Reaves in 1959. He also got his stage name from Reaves. The first time she saw him, she exclaimed, "Oh, he's just a baby!" and from then on he was no longer Lonnie Thomas but Lonnie Youngblood.

Youngblood's first solo recording, "Heartbreak" became a hit and help him work as bandleader for Faye Adams, Buster Brown, and Baby Washington. Youngblood was a regular on college campuses in the 1960s and appeared numerous times at the Alpha Delta Phi fraternity at Dartmouth College on which the Delta House in the film Animal House was largely based.

Youngblood doesn't appear to have played with Hendrix after these 1966 sessions. Then in 1969 he was photographed jamming on stage with Youngblood in New York, and around this time he also added a lead guitar overdub to Youngblood's song "Georgia Blues". The two remained friends up until Jimi's death in 1970. Youngblood worked mostly as a backup musician during the remainder of the 60's for James Brown, Jackie Wilson, Ben E. King, Sam & Dave, and other soul greats.

The recordings that Youngblood made that featured Hendrix amounted to four songs on two singles. They were released during Hendrix's lifetime. They were "Soul Food (That's a What I Like)" / "Goodbye, Bessie Mae" and "Go Go Shoes" / "Go Go Place".

Lonnie Youngblood continues to perform, and is nicknamed the "Prince of Harlem".

== Solo releases ==
Lonnie Youngblood has released at least four albums from the 1970s to the 1980s. Live At The Sugar Shack in 1971, Sweet Sweet Tootie in 1973 and the self-titled Lonnie Youngblood in 1977. All of them on the Turbo Records label. In 1981, Feelings was released by Warner Music Group.

In 2011, he recorded an album with electric organist Dave "Baby" Cortez for Norton Records, catalog number 380.

== Releases ==
=== Singles ===
- "Go Go Shoes" / "Go Go Place", Fairmount Records F-1002, 1966
- "Soul Food (That's a What I Like)" / "Goodbye, Bessie Mae", Fairmount Records F-1022, 1967
- "African Twist - Part 1" / "African Twist" - Part 2, Loma 2081, October 1967

=== Albums ===
- Live At The Sugar Shack, Turbo Records TU 7003, 1971
- Sweet Sweet Tootie, Turbo Records TU-7011, 1973
- Two Great Experiences Together, Maple Record Co LPM 6004, 1971 (Jimi Hendrix & Lonnie Youngblood)
- Lonnie Youngblood, Turbo Records TU-7019, 1977
