= Curtis Knight =

American musician (1929–1999)

- Born: Mont Curtis McNear; May 9, 1929; Fort Scott, Kansas, U.S.
- Died: November 29, 1999 (aged 70) Lelystad, Flevoland, Netherlands
- Genres: Rhythm and blues, soul, rock
- Occupation: Musician
- Instrument: Vocals
- Years active: 1960s–1999
- Labels: RSVP, Capitol, London, President, PPX
- Formerly of: The Titans, Curtis Knight and the Squires, Curtis Knight Zeus, Curtis Knight & Half Past Midnight

Curtis Knight (May 9, 1929 – November 29, 1999), born Mont Curtis McNear, was an American musician who is known for his association with Jimi Hendrix.

== Background ==
Knight was a singer in the 1960s Harlem R&B music scene, usually fronting his own band, the Squires. In 1965, with Hendrix as guitarist, he recorded some singles and demos for record producer Ed Chalpin. Chalpin also signed Hendrix to a management contract, which Hendrix soon forgot about and left for England in 1966 to form the Jimi Hendrix Experience. After Hendrix became famous, Knight and Chalpin issued hundreds of albums of the recordings with Hendrix, resulting in years of legal action by both sides.

Knight was an accomplished table tennis player who competed locally while living in New York.

== Career ==
It was reported in the 9 May 1970 issue of Billboard that Knight along with Anthony Swete and Ella Moore had been added to the Paramount label, and the album from Knight was to be Down in the Village. The album was released on Paramount PAS 5023 (S) and it was given a four star rating in the 5 December issue of Billboard. The album also received a positive review in the 26 December issue of Record World where the reviewer wrote that some people who encountered Knight will be reminded of Hendrix and Knight was "just about as acid as anyone gets in these post-acid days." The reviewer also noted that Knight had written all of the songs and there was a message that may mean something to young fans of hard rock.

At some stage, Knight moved to London, where he formed the group "Curtis Knight, Zeus", and toured throughout Europe, relying on his Hendrix connection for many years. Among the musicians enlisted was Fast Eddie Clarke, who later joined Motörhead.

In 1974, Knight authored a biography Jimi: An Intimate Biography of Jimi Hendrix.

It was reported in the 28 October 1989 issue of Music Week that Curtis Knight and the Midnight Cowboys had released their Live in Europe album on the German SPV label.

Knight wrote a second book on Hendrix, titled Starchild, published in the mid-1990s. In 1992, Knight relocated to the Netherlands where he continued to record up to his death from cancer in November 1999.

Some forty-six years after its release, Down in the Village was revisited by Jive Time Records. Of the songs on the album, the reviewer wrote that they "still hit with a bracing impact 46 years after their initial release".

== Family background ==
Knight is related to singer Barbara McNair who is reportedly his cousin.

== Partial discography ==
In 2003, Hendrix's estate finally prevailed in their legal actions against Chalpin and gained control of all of Hendrix's recordings associated with Knight, Chalpin, and PPX. Experience Hendrix, which currently manages Hendrix's recording legacy, has begun releasing the material he recorded with Knight. Much of it has been sonically restored and removes later overdubs and electronic effects.

Singles

- "Voodoo Woman" / "That's Why" – Curtis Knight (1961, Gulf)
- "You're Gonna Be Sorry" / "Little Doe-Doe" – Curtis Knight (1962, Shell)
- "Ain't Gonna Be No Next Time" / "More Love" – Curtis Knight (1965, RSVP)
- "How Would You Feel" / "Welcome Home" – Curtis Knight (1965, RSVP)
- "Hornet's Nest" / "Knock Yourself Out" – Curtis Knight and the Squires (1966, RSVP)
- "You Don't Want Me" / "How Would You Feel" – Curtis Knight and Jimi Hendrix (1967, Track Records)
- "Hush Now" / "Flashing" – Jimi Hendrix and Curtis Knight (1967, London Records)
- "Day Tripper" / "Love, Love" – Jimi Hendrix and Curtis Knight (1967, London Records)
- "Ballad of Jimi" / "Gloomy Monday" – Curtis Knight and Jimi Hendrix (1970, London Records)

Albums

- Get That Feeling – "Jimi Hendrix Plays and Curtis Knight Sings" (1967, Capitol Records)
- Flashing – "Jimi Hendrix Plays and Curtis Knight Sings" (1968, Capitol Records)
- Down in the Village – 1970
- Love, Peace & Freedom – (1972, Decca)
- You Can't Use My Name: The RSVP/PPX Sessions – Curtis Knight and the Squires (2015, Legacy Recordings)
- Live at George's Club 20 1965 & 1966 – Curtis Knight Featuring Jimi Hendrix (2017, Dagger Records)
- No Business - The PPX Sessions Volume 2 – Curtis Knight and the Squires (2020, Dagger Records)

== Notes ==
Citations

References

- Knight-McConnell, Kathy (2010). Curtis Knight: Living in the Shadow of Jimi Hendrix. PublishAmerica. ISBN 978-1-4489-7064-3.
- McDermott, John (2015). You Can't Use My Name: The RSVP/PPX Sessions (Album booklet). Curtis Knight and the Squires. New York City: Legacy Recordings. 88875077992.
- Roby, Steven (2002). Black Gold: The Lost Archives of Jimi Hendrix. New York City: Billboard Books. ISBN 0-8230-7854-X.
- Roby, Steven; Schreiber, Brad (2010). Becoming Jimi Hendrix. Cambridge, Massachusetts: Da Capo Press. ISBN 978-0-306-81910-0.
- Shapiro, Harry; Glebbeek, Cesar (1990). Jimi Hendrix: Electric Gypsy. New York City: St. Martin's Press. ISBN 0-312-05861-6.
