= Blue Wild Angel: Live at the Isle of Wight =

Live album by Jimi Hendrix
- Released: November 12, 2002
- Recorded: August 31, 1970
- Venues: Isle of Wight Festival, Isle of Wight, England
- Genre: Rock
- Length: 119:02
- Label: MCA
- Producers: Janie Hendrix, Eddie Kramer, John McDermott

Jimi Hendrix chronology
The Baggy's Rehearsal Sessions (2002)	Blue Wild Angel: Live at the Isle of Wight (2002)	Paris 1967/San Francisco 1968 (2003)

Blue Wild Angel: Live at the Isle of Wight is a posthumous live album by Jimi Hendrix released on November 12, 2002. The album documents Hendrix's last U.K. live performance at the Isle of Wight Festival on August 31, 1970, three weeks before his death. The set list for the concert contained songs from the original Experience albums, as well as new songs. Some were previously available on Isle of Wight (1971) and Live Isle of Wight '70 (1991). "Power to Love (Message of Love)", "Midnight Lightning", and "Foxy Lady" were released in the US on the three record set The First Great Rock Festivals of the 70s: Isle of Wight/Atlanta Pop Festival released on Columbia Records in 1971.

== Overview ==
Included in the set was an adaptation of "God Save the Queen" and a cover of The Beatles' "Sgt. Pepper's Lonely Hearts Club Band", played just before launching into "Spanish Castle Magic". The 22-minute version of "Machine Gun" includes walkie-talkie interference from security personnel feeding through the sound equipment.

The CD set is more complete than the DVD release as it contains "Midnight Lightning", "Hey Baby (New Rising Sun)", and "Hey Joe", three songs omitted from the DVD. There was also a "highlights" album released as a single disc, which contained eleven songs – nine from disc one and two from disc two. It was re-released in 2003 as a three-disc "Deluxe Sound & Vision Edition" in a special box and slip cover format as part of Experience Hendrix's plan to re-release most of Jimi Hendrix's recorded material.

Professional ratings
Review scores
Source	Rating
AllMusic	3/5 stars
BBC Music	(mixed)
Blender	2/5 stars
Rolling Stone	4/5 stars

== Track listings ==
All songs were written by Jimi Hendrix, except where noted.

Disc one

1. "God Save the Queen" (Traditional) – 3:54
2. "Sgt. Pepper's Lonely Hearts Club Band" (John Lennon, Paul McCartney) – 0:49
3. "Spanish Castle Magic" – 5:09
4. "All Along the Watchtower" (Bob Dylan) – 5:39
5. "Machine Gun" – 22:10
6. "Lover Man" – 2:58
7. "Freedom" – 4:36
8. "Red House" – 11:36
9. "Dolly Dagger" – 6:01
10. "Midnight Lightning" – 6:23

Disc two

1. "Foxey Lady" – 9:11
2. "Message to Love" – 6:23
3. "Hey Baby (New Rising Sun)" – 6:58
4. "Ezy Ryder" – 4:34
5. "Hey Joe" (Billy Roberts) – 4:32
6. "Purple Haze" – 3:31
7. "Voodoo Child (Slight Return)" – 8:16
8. "In from the Storm" – 6:14

Total time – 118:54

Single disc release

1. "God Save the Queen" (Traditional) – 3:54
2. "Sgt. Pepper's Lonely Hearts Club Band" (Lennon, McCartney) – 0:49
3. "Spanish Castle Magic" – 5:09
4. "All Along the Watchtower" (Dylan) – 5:39
5. "Machine Gun" – 18:22
6. "Lover Man" – 2:58
7. "Freedom" – 4:36
8. "Red House" – 11:36
9. "Dolly Dagger" – 6:01
10. "Hey Baby (New Rising Sun)" – 6:58
11. "In from the Storm" – 6:14

Total time – 72:16

DVD

1. "God Save the Queen" (Traditional)
2. "Sgt. Pepper's Lonely Hearts Club Band" (Lennon, McCartney)
3. "Spanish Castle Magic"
4. "All Along the Watchtower" (Dylan)
5. "Machine Gun"
6. "Lover Man"
7. "Freedom"
8. "Red House"
9. "Dolly Dagger"
10. "Foxey Lady"
11. "Message to Love"
12. "Ezy Ryder"
13. "Purple Haze"
14. "Voodoo Child (Slight Return)"
15. "In from the Storm"

== Personnel ==
- Jimi Hendrix – guitar, vocals
- Mitch Mitchell – drums
- Billy Cox – bass guitar
