= Get That Feeling =

Studio album by Jimi Hendrix and Curtis Knight
- Released: 1967
- Label: Capitol
- Producer: Ed Chalpin

Get That Feeling is an album by Jimi Hendrix and Curtis Knight. It was released in 1967 and charted in both the US and the UK.

== Background ==
The album appeared after the initial success of the Jimi Hendrix Experience in 1967, and consists of old studio recordings from years before that had not been intended for release, with Hendrix performing in the backing band during sessions for an album by Knight. There is some dispute about who sings lead vocals on some of the tracks. The song "Hush Now" was released as single. According to Sounds magazine in the issue dated September 17, 1977, Get That Feeling was reviewed in the March 9, 1968 issue of Rolling Stone. Hendrix was quite negative about it and said that it was "a confetti of tapes hastily thrown together". He told a Melody Maker interviewer in December 1967:

"They were nothing but jam sessions, man, with a group called the Squirts. No, I didn’t sing on 'Hush Now', that was dubbed on later by Knight trying to copy my voice. And on that one the guitar was out of tune and I was stoned out of my mind. We're going to get those records stopped."

In the Netherlands, the album was heavily promoted by Phonogram. The album was also released in Argentina in 1970 under the title Postumo by Groove Records.

== Reception ==
The album was reviewed by Norman Jopling and, or Peter Jones in the February 3, 1968 issue of Record Mirror. It was given three stars. They had the copy that was issued on London HA 8349. The tracks were listed. The reviewer wasn't sure of which tracks Curtis Knight or Jimi Hendrix sang on. Noting that the album was recorded before "Hey Joe", the reviewer said that most of the songs had the power and rhythm Hendrix was known for in his later work. The reviewer also said that the guitar came though strong and even though it wasn't a current representation of Hendrix, it was an album for the kids who enjoyed loud music with an R&B and psychedelic base.

Along with Magical Mystery Tour by the Beatles and Wild Honey by the Beach Boys, Get That Feeling was one of the three best-selling albums on Capitol Records as noted by Record World in the magazine's 13 January 1968 issue. The album was also at no. 21 in the magazine's LP'S Coming Up Chart. The record was reviewed by "Lori" in the 9 March 1968 issue of the Canadian magazine RPM Weekly. She mentioned the dominant guitar and said that it was a must for Hendrix fans.

== Commercial performance ==
Spending two weeks in the UK Albums Chart, the album would eventually peak at no. 39.

For the week of January 13, the album debuted at. 21 on the US Record World LP's Coming Up Chart. On the week of 20 January, the album debuted at no. 91 on the Record World 100 Top LP's chart. At that time, Hendrix's album Are You Experienced was at no. 22 in the same chart. On 2 March at week seven, it reached its peak position of no. 54. It held that position for another week. It spent a total of nine weeks in the chart. Also, in the US it made it to no. 75 on the Billboard chart.

== Track listing ==
All songs written by Curtis Knight, except "Get That Feeling", written by Knight and Ed Gregory.

Side A

1. "How Would You Feel"
2. "Simon Says"
3. "Get That Feeling"

Side B

1. "Hush Now"
2. "Welcome Home"
3. "Gotta Have a New Dress"
4. "No Business"
5. "Strange Things"
