= Dolly Dagger =

- 1997 reissue single picture sleeve

Single by Jimi Hendrix

from the album Rainbow Bridge
- B-side: "The Star-Spangled Banner"
- Released: October 1971
- Recorded: July–August 1970
- Studio: Electric Lady, New York City
- Genre: Funk rock
- Length: 4:45
- Label: Reprise
- Songwriter: Jimi Hendrix
- Producers: Jimi Hendrix; Mitch Mitchell; Eddie Kramer; John Jansen

Jimi Hendrix U.S. singles chronology
| "Freedom" (1971) | "Dolly Dagger" (1971) | "Johnny B. Goode" (1972) |

"Dolly Dagger" is a song written and recorded by Jimi Hendrix. On October 9, 1971, it was released on the posthumous album Rainbow Bridge, followed by a single on October 23. Backed with a multi-tracked studio solo rendition of the "Star Spangled Banner", the single peaked at number 74 on the Billboard Hot 100, making it the last Hendrix single to appear on the main Billboard chart.

== Lyrics ==
Biographers consider the song to be written about Hendrix's girlfriend Devon Wilson, with the song's name referencing her "concurrent relationship with Mick Jagger". The lyrics "she drinks her blood from a jagged edge" refer to a "party where Mick Jagger cut his finger, Wilson elbowed her way in to suck the blood off as Hendrix watched".

== Performances and releases ==
The Rainbow Bridge album was used to fulfill manager Michael Jeffery's obligation to give Reprise Records a soundtrack album for the film Rainbow Bridge. Although labeled "Original Soundtrack", the album did not feature any music performed in the original film. However, most of the tracks on the album were used as incidental music for the film. In 2020, the songs Hendrix performed during the filming were released on the two-CD set Live in Maui, including "Dolly Dagger", which opened the second set.

Between July and September 1970, Hendrix occasionally played "Dolly Dagger" during The Cry of Love Tour. A version recorded at the Isle of Wight Festival 1970 was included on Blue Wild Angel: Live at the Isle of Wight album and DVD. In a review for AllMusic, Sean Westergaard noted that "much of the new material was under-rehearsed for a live setting, giving some of the newer songs like 'Dolly Dagger' more of a jam feel".
