= Curtis Knight and the Squires =

American musical group

- Labels: Dagger Records, Experience Hendrix, Legacy, PPX, RSVP, Sony Music
- Past members: Hank Anderson; Marion Booker Jr. Nate Edmonds; Ace Hall; Henry Henderson; Jimi Hendrix; Curtis McNear; Ray Lucas; Lonnie Youngblood; Ditto Edwards

Curtis Knight and the Squires were a New York band that was fronted by singer and guitarist Curtis Knight in the mid-1960s. Both Jimi Hendrix and sax player Lonnie Youngblood were members for a while.

== Background ==
The band is referred to as a workaday party R&B band by Billboard. The line up of the group wasn't always with the same musicians. Sax player Lonnie Youngblood had been a member. The line up pictured on the cover of the You Can't Use My Name: The RSVP/PPX Sessions album features Curtis Knight, Jimi Hendrix, Marion Booker and Ace Hall.

At some stage in 1964, Hendrix met Knight in the lobby of a Harlem residential hotel and they hit it off. Hendrix became a member of the band Curtis Knight and the Squires in October the following year. While with the band, Hendrix signed a contract with the owner of PPX Studios, Ed Chaplin for just one dollar. This would later cause major problems for Hendrix. He finally left The Squires on May 20, 1966.

== Releases ==
In September 1966, "Hornet's Nest" bw "Knock Yourself Out" were released on the RSVP label, RSVP 1124. Hendrix co-composed them with Jerry Simon. The two songs on the single are the representative of Hendrix's first compositions to be on a recorded release.

In 2000, the UK label Jungle records released the album Jimi Hendrix with Curtis Knight & The Squires – Knock Yourself Out: The 1965 Studio Sessions which in addition to the 10 studio tracks included 5 bonus live tracks.

In 2015, the album You Can't Use My Name: The RSVP/PPX Sessions was released. It featured recordings Hendrix made with the group around 1965. The album features "Hornets Nest", "No Such Animal", and "Knock Yourself Out". It also features a song called "How Would You Feel", which has a strong resemblance to Bob Dylan's "Like a Rolling Stone". Allmusic's review of the album by Stephen Thomas Erlewine describes Knight "rewriting Dylan's "Like a Rolling Stone" as a black rock protest song called "How Would You Feel" "

== Personnel ==
- Napoleon Anderson a.k.a. Hank Anderson ... bass
- Marion Booker ... drums (often spelled Marlon Booker)
- George Bragg ... drums
- Nathaniel Edmonds Sr. a.k.a. Nate Edmonds ... keyboards
- Ditto Edwards ... drums
- Ed "Bugs" Gregory ... bass
- Ace Hall ... bass & tambourine
- James Marshall Hendrix a.k.a. Jimmy James a.k.a. Jimi Hendrix ... guitar & vocals
- Harry Jensen - guitar & bass
- Curtis McNear a.k.a. Curtis Knight ... vocals, guitar & tambourine
- Ray Lucas ... drums
- "Shears" ... guitar (participated in the 1967 sessions)
- Lonnie Thomas a.k.a. Lonnie Youngblood ... sax & vocals

== Discography ==
Singles
Title	Release info	Year	Notes
"Hornet's Nest" / "Knock Yourself Out"	RSVP RSVP 1124	1966	

Albums
Title	Release info	Year	F	Notes
'Knock Yourself Out' The 1965 Studio Sessions	Jungle Records FREUD CD 066	2000	CD	UK release
You Can't Use My Name: The RSVP/PPX Sessions	Experience Hendrix, Sony Music, Legacy 88875077992	2015	CD	
