= Becoming Jimi Hendrix =

2010 biography by Steven Roby and Brad Schreiber

Becoming Jimi Hendrix: From Southern Crossroads to Psychedelic London, the Untold Story of a Musical Genius
- Authors: Steven Roby and Brad Schreiber
- Publisher: 2010
- Pages: 274
- ISBN: 9780306819100

Becoming Jimi Hendrix: From Southern Crossroads to Psychedelic London, the Untold Story of a Musical Genius is a biography of American rock and roll musician Jimi Hendrix, written by Steven Roby and Brad Schreiber. It was published by Da Cabo Press in 2010.

The book is an account of Hendrix's life leading up to him becoming famous as a performer. The authors write about Hendrix's life beginning as child obsessed with music, through the time he was in the U.S. Army, in addition to when he lived in poverty and learned from artists including Little Richard and The Isley Brothers. It details what his experiences were like living in Nashville, Greenwich Village, and Harlem. Those places and people in the areas had an impact on his musical style. David Kirby of The New York Times said Hendrix's exposure to Bob Dylan was among his most defining moment and Hendrix became successful a year later. Adweek related that the most salient insight into Hendrix's personality presented by the book, was his great interest in science fiction literature.
