= Isle of Wight (album) =

Live album by Jimi Hendrix
- Released: November 1971
- Recorded: August 31, 1970
- Venues: Isle of Wight Festival, England
- Genre: Rock
- Length: 34:02
- Label: Polydor
- Producer: Michael Jeffery

Jimi Hendrix UK chronology
| Experience (1971) | Isle of Wight (1971) | Rainbow Bridge (1971) |

Isle of Wight is a posthumous live album by Jimi Hendrix, released in November 1971 by Polydor in the UK and Europe. It documents some of Hendrix's performance at the Isle of Wight Festival on August 31, 1970, his last official performance in England before his death less than three weeks later on September 18, 1970.

The album was engineered by Carlos Ohlms (a British-based engineer). The cover photo is from a live concert on September 4, 1970 at Deutschlandhalle, Berlin. The album spent two weeks on the UK Albums Chart, peaking at No. 17. Some tracks appeared on the three record set The First Great Rock Festivals of the Seventies on Columbia Records in the US.

The album went out-of-print and is superseded by Blue Wild Angel: Live at the Isle of Wight (2002), which contains the full performance.

== Track listing ==
All songs were written by Hendrix, except where noted. The track durations are taken from the first (1988) Polydor CD reissue (earlier LPs did not list timings) and may differ from other sources.

Side one
| No. | Title | Length |
|---|---|---|
| 1. | "Midnight Lightning" | 7:14 |
| 2. | "Foxy Lady" | 8:54 |
| 3. | "Lover Man" | 3:04 |

Side two
| No. | Title | Length |
|---|---|---|
| 1. | "Freedom" | 4:18 |
| 2. | "All Along the Watchtower" (Bob Dylan) | 4:28 |
| 3. | "In from the Storm" | 6:06 |

== Personnel ==
- Jimi Hendrix – guitar, vocals
- Mitch Mitchell – drums
- Billy Cox – bass guitar
