= Harry Shapiro (author) =

British author and journalist

- Occupation: Author

Harry Shapiro is a British author and journalist. He has parallel careers working in the UK drugs charity sector and as a music biographer.

== Biography ==
He joined the Institute for the Study of Drug Dependence in 1979 which became DrugScope in 2000 and closed in 2015. Shapiro had various roles within these organisations – in policy, information and communications ending as Director of Communications for DrugScope. During that period, he wrote over 80 articles for Druglink magazine as well as in-house publications, reports and peer-reviewed papers. He is a guest lecturer, conference speaker and media spokesperson. He is currently Director of DrugWise, a small online drug information service.

Since 2015, Shapiro has also been involved in the world of tobacco harm reduction to encourage smokers who cannot give up nicotine to switch away to far safer products such as e-cigarettes. In that role, he is the author and executive editor of the Global State of Tobacco Harm Reduction report.

His books include, Recreational Drugs: A Directory, Waiting for the Man: the Story of Drugs and Popular Music and Shooting Stars: Drugs, Hollywood and the Movies. His history of the UK drug scene Fierce Chemistry was published in 2021.

On the music side, he is the author of biographies on Jimi Hendrix, Gary Moore, Eric Clapton, Jack Bruce, Alexis Korner and Graham Bond. His biography of Gary Moore is published in German (June 2022) and in English (September 2022). The latest work in progress is a biography of the Louisiana blues guitarist, John Campbell. He has written music articles for various UK magazines.

The Hendrix biography Electric Gypsy was short-listed for the Ralph J Gleason music book awards while Waiting for the Man was voted one of the best music books of the 20th century on the BBC Millennium website 2000.

Shapiro's books have been translated into French, Spanish, German, Japanese and Mandarin

== Selected bibliography ==
- Jimi Hendrix: Electric Gypsy. Mandarin, 1992. ISBN 0-74-930544-4
- Gary Moore: The Official Biography. Jawbone, 2022. ISBN 978-1911036975
- Eric Clapton: Lost in the Blues. Da Capo, 1992. ISBN 0-30-680480-8
- Graham Bond: the Mighty Shadow. Guinness 1992. ISBN 978-0851125831
- Jack Bruce: Composing Himself. Jawbone, 2010. ISBN 978-1906002268
- Alexis Korner: the Biography. Bloomsbury, 1996. ISBN 0-74-753163-3
- Bob Dylan: His Life in Pictures. Chartwell Books, 2019. ISBN 0-78-583760-4
- Waiting for the Man: the Story of Drugs and Popular Music. Helter Skelter, 2003.ISBN 978-1900924580
- Shooting Stars: Drugs, Hollywood and the Movies. Serpent's Tail, 2003. ISBN 1-85-242651-9
- Recreational Drugs: a Directory. Salamander, 2004. ISBN 1-84-340244-0
- Fierce Chemistry: a History of UK Drug Wars. Amberley, 2021. ISBN 1-44-566544-1
