= Lifelines: The Jimi Hendrix Story =

Box set (Radio program/Live album) by Jimi Hendrix
- Released: November 27, 1990
- Recorded: 1966–1970
- Genre: Rock
- Label: Reprise
- Producer: Bruce Gary

Jimi Hendrix chronology
Cornerstones: 1967-1970 (1990)	Lifelines: The Jimi Hendrix Story (1990)	Sessions (1991)

Professional ratings
Review scores
Source	Rating
AllMusic	2/5 stars

Lifelines: The Jimi Hendrix Story is a posthumous box set by Jimi Hendrix. The four compact disc set was released by Reprise Records on November 27, 1990, and produced by Bruce Gary. The first three discs comprise Live & Unreleased: The Radio Show, a narrated radio presentation of Hendrix's career. The fourth, titled The L. A. Forum Concert, contains live recordings from the Jimi Hendrix Experience's performance at the Forum in Los Angeles on April 26, 1969. The complete Forum performance was released in 2022 as Los Angeles Forum: April 26, 1969.

== Track listing ==
All songs were written by Jimi Hendrix, except where noted.

=== Disc one ===
1. "Introduction"
2. "Testify" (Ronald Isley, O'Kelly Isley, Rudolph Isley)
  - Performed by The Isley Brothers; Hendrix on guitar
3. "Lawdy Miss Clawdy" (Lloyd Price)
  - Performed by Little Richard; Hendrix had no involvement with this track
4. "I'm a Man" (Ellas McDaniel a.k.a. Bo Diddley)
  - Performed by Curtis Knight and the Squires; Hendrix on guitar and lead vocals
5. "Like a Rolling Stone" (Bob Dylan)
6. "Red House"
7. "Hey Joe" (Billy Roberts)
8. "Hoocie Koochie Man" (Willie Dixon)
9. "Purple Haze"
10. "The Wind Cries Mary"
11. "Foxey Lady"

=== Disc two ===
1. "Third Stone from the Sun"
2. "Rock Me Baby" (B.B. King)
3. "Look Over Yonder/Mister Bad Luck"
4. "Burning of the Midnight Lamp"
5. "Spanish Castle Magic"
6. "Bold as Love"
7. "One Rainy Wish"
8. "Little Wing"
9. "Drivin' South"
10. "The Things I Used to Do" (Eddie Jones a.k.a. Guitar Slim)
  - Jam with Johnny Winter, Stephen Stills, and Dallas Taylor
11. "All Along the Watchtower" (Dylan)
12. "Drifter's Escape" (Dylan)
13. "Cherokee Mist"
14. "Voodoo Child (Slight Return)"
15. "1983... (A Merman I Should Turn to Be)"

=== Disc three ===
1. "Voodoo Chile"
2. "Come On (Part 1)" (Earl King)
3. "Manic Depression"
4. "Machine Gun"
5. "Room Full of Mirrors"
6. "Angel"
7. "Rainy Day Shuffle"
8. "Valleys of Neptune"
9. "Send My Love to Linda"
10. "South Saturn Delta"
11. "Dolly Dagger"
12. "Night Bird Flying"

=== Disc four ===
The L. A. Forum Concert

1. "Tax Free" (Bo Hansson, Janne Carlsson) – 13:57 (Note: "Foxey Lady" was played in between "Tax Free" and "Red House" and can be found as a CD bonus track on The Jimi Hendrix Concerts)
2. "Red House" – 11:07
3. "Spanish Castle Magic" – 11:43
4. "Star Spangled Banner" (Francis Scott Key, adapted by Hendrix) – 2:30
5. "Purple Haze" – 6:57
6. "I Don't Live Today" – 7:06
7. "Voodoo Chile / Sunshine of Your Love" (Hendrix / Pete Brown, Jack Bruce, Eric Clapton) – 17:15
