= Fire: The Jimi Hendrix Collection =

Compilation album by Jimi Hendrix
- Released: June 7, 2010
- Recorded: 1966–1970
- Genre: Rock; Hard rock
- Length: 78:00
- Label: CMG
- Producer: Chas Chandler; Jimi Hendrix; Eddie Kramer; Mitch Mitchell

Jimi Hendrix chronology
Valleys of Neptune (2010)	Fire: The Jimi Hendrix Collection (2010)	West Coast Seattle Boy: The Jimi Hendrix Anthology (2010)

Fire: The Jimi Hendrix Collection is a posthumous compilation album by American rock musician Jimi Hendrix. Released on June 7, 2010, the album features 20 songs from throughout the career of the Jimi Hendrix Experience and Hendrix as a solo musician, including "Valleys of Neptune", only officially released on the album of the same name in March 2010. Released by CMG, the album is named after the Experience song "Fire", originally released on the band's debut album Are You Experienced in 1967.

== Track listing ==
All tracks are written by Jimi Hendrix, except where noted.

No.	Title	Original album	Length
1.	"Purple Haze"	Are You Experienced	2:51
2.	"Hey Joe" (Billy Roberts)	Are You Experienced	3:29
3.	"Fire"	Are You Experienced	2:43
4.	"All Along the Watchtower" (Bob Dylan)	Electric Ladyland	3:58
5.	"Voodoo Child (Slight Return)"	Electric Ladyland	5:12
6.	"Crosstown Traffic"	Electric Ladyland	2:19
7.	"Foxy Lady"	Are You Experienced	3:18
8.	"Valleys of Neptune"	Valleys of Neptune	4:02
9.	"Are You Experienced"	Are You Experienced	4:14
10.	"The Wind Cries Mary"	Are You Experienced	3:20
11.	"Freedom"	The Cry of Love	3:25
12.	"Red House"	Are You Experienced	3:50
13.	"Burning of the Midnight Lamp"	Electric Ladyland	3:39
14.	"Wait Until Tomorrow"	Axis: Bold as Love	3:00
15.	"Little Wing"	Axis: Bold as Love	2:24
16.	"Sunshine of Your Love" (Jack Bruce, Eric Clapton, Pete Brown)	Valleys of Neptune	6:45
17.	"Castles Made of Sand"	Axis: Bold as Love	2:47
18.	"Angel"	The Cry of Love	4:22
19.	"Bleeding Heart" (Elmore James)	Valleys of Neptune	6:20
20.	"Hey Baby (New Rising Sun)"	Rainbow Bridge	6:04
Total length:			78:00
