= Los Angeles Forum: April 26, 1969 =

2022 live album by the Jimi Hendrix Experience

Live album by the Jimi Hendrix Experience
- Released: November 18, 2022
- Recorded: April 26, 1969
- Venues: The Forum, Inglewood, California
- Genre: Rock
- Length: 79:10
- Label: Experience Hendrix/Legacy
- Producers: Janie Hendrix, Eddie Kramer, John McDermott

Jimi Hendrix chronology
Live in Maui (2020)	Los Angeles Forum: April 26, 1969 (2022)	Live at the Hollywood Bowl: August 18, 1967 (2023)

Los Angeles Forum: April 26, 1969 is a live album by the Jimi Hendrix Experience. It was recorded during the group's last North American tour and includes a mix of popular Experience album songs along with some instrumentals. The album is the first full live release by the trio with Hendrix, Noel Redding, and Mitch Mitchell since 2013's Miami Pop Festival. The recording documents the trio's live performance at the Los Angeles Forum and features material from their studio repertoire alongside instrumental performances.

Experience Hendrix and Sony Music's Legacy Recordings released it as a double record album and CD on November 18, 2022. It is the first time that the entire concert is available on an official album. Longtime Hendrix audio engineer Eddie Kramer mixed the recordings, which were "sourced directly from the original eight-track master tapes", according to Experience Hendrix.

== Background ==
Since forming in October 1966, the Jimi Hendrix Experience released three highly successful albums and toured extensively throughout Europe and North America. By 1969, the group had become one of the few rock attractions "with enough drawing power to sell out huge venues like the Forum and New York's Madison Square Garden". In April 1969, they began yet another American tour. Experience manager Michael Jeffery arranged for Wally Heider (who had recorded the Experience at Monterey Pop in 1967) to record some shows. After promising performances at the Forum (Note: The Forum in Inglewood, California, is frequently called the "Los Angeles Forum" or the "Forum, Los Angeles, California" because of its proximity and association with Los Angeles.) on April 26 and San Diego Sports Arena on May 24, Eddie Kramer arrived at Heider's Hollywood studios to prepare mixes from the multitrack recordings.

Jeffery was hoping to use a live album to satisfy a contract dispute with a former Hendrix manager. Kramer and Hendrix spent three days at Heider's studio, "assembled a superb album of live performances", and delivered the tapes to Jeffery. However, nothing was forthcoming and by June 15, 1969, plans for a live album were dropped. In later years, the Forum concert recordings were released piecemeal: (Note: Recordings from the May 24, 1969, San Diego Sports Arena concert had a similar fate, with tracks appearing on various live albums and disc three of the live Stages box set (1991).) "Foxey Lady" was added as a bonus track on the 1989 CD-reissue of The Jimi Hendrix Concerts (1982) and the following year, the rest of the tracks were included on disc four of Lifelines: The Jimi Hendrix Story box set. Other releases include "Red House" on Variations on a Theme: Red House (1992); "I Don't Live Today" on The Jimi Hendrix Experience (2000) box set and the Voodoo Child: The Jimi Hendrix Collection (2001) compilation; and The "Star Spangled Banner" and "Purple Haze" on West Coast Seattle Boy: The Jimi Hendrix Anthology (2010).

== Performance ==
In 1969, rock concerts at large indoor venues, such as the Forum, were relatively new. It was also a time of social unrest and popular concert events attracted their share of difficulties. Hendrix biographer Keith Shadwick commented, "As so often there was a troubled atmosphere in the arena reflecting the turmoil that continued to dominate America's social and political life; here it was exacerbated by the security personnel's reaction to provocation from unruly elements in the crowd." In an effort to prevent the capacity crowd from rushing the stage, "the cops had lined up on the stage in front of him [Hendrix], in some mysterious police method of crowd control".

Tensions heightened and those in charge threatened to cut the power; Hendrix announced "Look, they're going to cut the show short if this keeps up. So just sit down and be cool so these other 'people' [coughs] will get off the stage." During his performance of "Purple Haze", he changed "'scuse me while I kiss the sky" to "'scuse me while I kiss that policeman". Some see his attempts as sarcasm, however, Shadwick feels that with humor and common sense, Hendrix "repeatedly defuses a situation where more heavy-handed methods would only make things worse".

Also, by 1969, difficulties between Experience bassist Noel Redding and Hendrix were coming to a head. Hendrix had played bass on several songs that appeared on Axis: Bold As Love (1967 and Electric Ladyland (1968), and invited other musicians to record on the latter. In his autobiography, Redding expressed his increasing frustration with Hendrix's habit of showing up late for recording sessions, sometimes accompanied by a group of hangers-on, and generally not being supportive of his role in the group. Redding responded in part by forming his own band, Fat Mattress, where he returned to playing guitar, instead of bass. During the Forum concert, Redding's approach to dealing with the security issue also showed the growing division, with his angry comments at odds with Hendrix's more conciliatory approach. After riots during performances in San Diego (May 24) and Denver (June 29), Redding quit the Experience and returned to England.

== Critical reception ==
Professional ratings
Review scores
Source	Rating
All About Jazz	4/5 stars
AllMusic	4/5 stars
American Songwriter	4/5 stars
Mojo	4/5 stars
The Telegraph	5/5 stars

AllMusic reviewer Mark Deming gave the album a rating of four out of five stars. He writes:

If this isn't the most tightly focused Jimi Hendrix Experience performance of all, it shows the group was still capable of delivering exciting, remarkable music even under difficult circumstances ... both [Hendrix and Mitchell] were in an inspired fashion this evening, while Redding's bass gives the music a simple but steady foundation ... the depth, detail, and sense of space in the audio serves this performance well.

== Track listing ==
All tracks are written by Jimi Hendrix, except where noted.

Los Angeles Forum: April 26, 1969 track listing
No.	Title	Notes	Length
1.	"Introduction"	Spoken (no music)	2:27
2.	"Tax Free" (Bo Hannson, Janne Karlsson)	Instrumental with drum solo	15:34
3.	"Foxey Lady"		4:56
4.	"Red House"		11:25
5.	"Spanish Castle Magic"	Includes improvised solo guitar	11:58
6.	"Star Spangled Banner" (Francis Scott Key arr. Hendrix)	Solo guitar instrumental	2:31
7.	"Purple Haze"		6:44
8.	"I Don't Live Today"		7:04
9.	"Voodoo Child (Slight Return)" (first part)	Tracks 9–11 are a medley	9:16
10.	"Sunshine of Your Love" (Jack Bruce, Pete Brown, Eric Clapton)	Instrumental	4:16
11.	"Voodoo Child (Slight Return)" (second part)		3:20
Total length:			79:10

== Personnel ==
- Jimi Hendrix – guitar, vocals
- Mitch Mitchell – drums
- Noel Redding – bass, backing vocals

== Charts ==
Chart performance for Los Angeles Forum: April 26, 1969
Chart (2022)	Peak position
Austrian Albums (Ö3 Austria)	41
Belgian Albums (Ultratop Flanders)	114
Belgian Albums (Ultratop Wallonia)	68
Dutch Albums (Album Top 100)	65
German Albums (Offizielle Top 100)	40
Japanese Albums (Oricon)	23
Japanese Hot Albums (Billboard Japan)	40
Scottish Albums (Official Charts)	27
Spanish Albums (Promusicae)	70
Swiss Albums (Schweizer Hitparade)	19
UK Album Downloads (Official Charts)	65
UK Rock & Metal Albums (Official Charts)	3
US Billboard 200	164

== Bibliography ==
- Lifelines: The Jimi Hendrix Story (Disc four notes). Jimi Hendrix. Burbank, California: Reprise. 1990. 9 26635-9.
- Loder, Kurt (2001). Voodoo Child: The Jimi Hendrix Collection (CD compilation booklet). Jimi Hendrix. Universal City, California: MCA Records. 066 112 603-2.
- McDermott, John; Kramer, Eddie; Cox, Billy (2009). Ultimate Hendrix. Milwaukee, Wisconsin: Backbeat Books. ISBN 978-0-87930-938-1.
- McDermott, John (2010). West Coast Seattle Boy: The Jimi Hendrix Anthology (CD/DVD set booklet). Jimi Hendrix. New York City: Sony Music Entertainment. OCLC 762162961. 88697769272.
- Pates, Bruce (1982). The Jimi Hendrix Concerts (1989 CD-reissue booklet). Jimi Hendrix. Burbank, California: Reprise. 9 36656-2.
- Redding, Noel; Appleby, Carol (1990). Are You Experienced?. London: Pan Books. ISBN 0-330-31923-X.
- Shadwick, Keith (2003). Jimi Hendrix: Musician (1st. ed.). San Francisco: Backbeat Books. ISBN 0-87930-764-1.
- Shapiro, Harry; Glebbeek, Cesar (1991). Jimi Hendrix: Electric Gypsy (1st. U.S. ed.). New York City: St. Martin's Press. ISBN 0-312-05861-6.
- Waksman, Steve (1999). Instruments of Desire: The Electric Guitar and the Shaping of Musical Experience. Cambridge, Massachusetts: Harvard University Press. ISBN 0-674-00065-X.
- Wheeler, Tom; Gore, Joe (1992). Variations on a Theme: Red House. Milwaukee, Wisconsin: Bella Godiva Music/Hal Leonard Publishing. ISBN 0-7935-1719-2.
