= Live & Unreleased: The Radio Show =

Box set by Jimi Hendrix
- Released: November 20, 1989
- Recorded: 1966–1970
- Genres: Rock, psychedelic rock, acid rock, blues rock
- Label: Castle Communications

Jimi Hendrix chronology
The Essential Jimi Hendrix Volumes One and Two (1989)	Live & Unreleased: The Radio Show (1989)	Cornerstones: 1967-1970 (1990)

Professional ratings
Review scores
Source	Rating
AllMusic	3/5 stars

Live & Unreleased: The Radio Show is a posthumous compilation box set by Jimi Hendrix, released in France by Castle Communications on November 20, 1989. The tracks included were originally broadcast as a six-hour radio show in the United States on September 2 and 3, 1988, and as such feature original narration. Live & Unreleased was released as a 5-LP set and a 3-CD set in the same year. Featuring rare songs and outtakes, some still not released through "Experience Hendrix"

== Track listing ==
All songs were written by Jimi Hendrix, except where noted.

=== Disc one ===
1. "Introduction"
2. "Testify" (Ronald Isley, O'Kelly Isley, Rudolph Isley)
  - Performed by The Isley Brothers; Hendrix on guitar
3. "Lawdy Miss Clawdy" (Lloyd Price)
  - Performed by Little Richard; Hendrix had no involvement with this track
4. "I'm a Man" (Bo Diddley)
  - Performed by Curtis Knight and the Squires; Hendrix on guitar and lead vocals
5. "Like a Rolling Stone" (Bob Dylan)
6. "Red House"
7. "Hey Joe" (Billy Roberts)
8. "Hoocie Koochie Man" (Willie Dixon)
9. "Purple Haze"
10. "The Wind Cries Mary"
11. "Foxy Lady BBC 1967"

=== Disc two ===
1. "Third Stone From the Sun"
2. "Wild Thing" (Chip Taylor)
3. "Look Over Yonder/Mister Bad Luck" (from the Are You Experienced sessions)
4. "Burning of the Midnight Lamp"
5. "Spanish Castle Magic"
6. "Bold as Love"
7. "One Rainy Wish"
8. "Little Wing"
9. "Drivin' South"
10. "The Things I Used to Do" (Eddie Jones)
11. "All Along the Watchtower" (Dylan)
12. "Drifter's Escape" (Dylan)
13. "Cherokee Mist"
14. "Voodoo Child (Slight Return)"
15. "1983... (A Merman I Should Turn to Be)"

=== Disc three ===
1. "Voodoo Chile"
2. "Come On (Part 1)" (Earl King)
3. "Manic Depression"
4. "Machine Gun"
5. "Room Full of Mirrors"
6. "Angel"
7. "Rainy Day Shuffle"
8. "Valleys of Neptune"
9. "Send My Love to Linda"
10. "South Saturn Delta"
11. "Dolly Dagger"
12. "Night Bird Flying"

== See also ==
- Jimi Hendrix discography
