= Radio One (album) =

Live album by the Jimi Hendrix Experience
- Released: November 1988
- Recorded: February–December 1967
- Studios: BBC Broadcasting House and Playhouse Theatre in London
- Genres: Rock, blues, soul, hard rock
- Length: 59:12
- Labels: Rykodisc (US); Carrere (France)

The Jimi Hendrix Experience chronology
Live at Winterland (1987)	Radio One (1988)	Cornerstones: 1967–1970 (1990)

Radio One is a live album by the Jimi Hendrix Experience. It was released posthumously in November 1988 by Rykodisc and compiles tracks recorded between February and December 1967 for broadcasts by BBC Radio. The album peaked at number 30 on the UK Albums Chart while it charted at number 119 on the Billboard 200 in the United States. After Hendrix's family gained control of his legacy, Radio One was supplanted by the more comprehensive BBC Sessions in 1998.

== Critical reception ==
Professional ratings
Review scores
Source	Rating
AllMusic	4.5/5 stars
The Encyclopedia of Popular Music	4/5 stars
Kerrang!	4.75/5
Rolling Stone	4/5 stars
The Rolling Stone Album Guide	4/5 stars
The Village Voice	A−

In a contemporary review for The Village Voice, Robert Christgau said Radio One is as good an introduction to Hendrix's music as his 1967 debut record Are You Experienced because while non-fanatics do not have to listen to different versions of the same songs, "Hendrix's versions do bear scrutiny like no other rock and roll." He was also impressed by the previously unreleased covers of "Hound Dog" and Curtis Knight's "Drivin' South", calling them first-rate. John Milward from the Chicago Tribune called it "one of the season's best new rock records", writing that it "supplements the first public stage of Hendrix's tragically brief evolution; the hard rock that forged his background in the blues and rhythm and blues into a sturdy platform for his instrumental pyrotechnics".

Rolling Stone magazine's David Fricke was even more enthusiastic, deeming it an all-important Hendrix album that documents his artistry as it developed in its earliest stages, with recordings showcasing his blues roots, lyrical ballads, and frenzied guitar playing. He believed it covers a period of "accelerated evolution" for Hendrix in 1967, from his debut album earlier that year to his performance at the Monterey Pop Festival and his second record, Axis: Bold as Love, later that year:

This is the sound of Hendrix reinventing rock & roll, almost day by day, in his own image. It is also the sound of Hendrix coping with the pressure and pain that were part of his reward. There's no other experience on record like it.

In a retrospective review for AllMusic, Richie Unterberger recommended Radio One to genuine fans of Hendrix's music because of its unpolished yet exceptional sound and showcase of his ability to perform different rock, soul, and blues styles. Paul Evans and Nathan Brackett wrote in The Rolling Stone Album Guide (1992) that of the live recordings from "the deluge posthumous albums" released after Hendrix's death, Radio One was one of the "most exciting", along with Live at Winterland (1987) and Stages (1991).

== Track listing ==
All tracks written by Jimi Hendrix except where noted.

No.	Title	Recording date and location	Length
1.	"Stone Free"	February 13, 1967, BBC Broadcasting House	3:23
2.	"Radio One"	December 15, 1967, BBC Playhouse Theatre	1:27
3.	"Day Tripper" (Lennon–McCartney)	December 15, 1967, BBC Playhouse Theatre	3:18
4.	"Killing Floor" (Howlin' Wolf)	March 28, 1967, BBC Broadcasting House	2:27
5.	"Love or Confusion"	February 13, 1967, BBC Broadcasting House	2:52
6.	"Drivin' South"	October 17, 1967, BBC Playhouse Theatre	4:49
7.	"Catfish Blues" (Robert Petway)	October 6, 1967, BBC Playhouse Theatre	5:28
8.	"Wait Until Tomorrow"	December 15, 1967, BBC Playhouse Theatre	2:55
9.	"Hear My Train a Comin'"	December 15, 1967, BBC Playhouse Theatre	4:52
10.	"Hound Dog" (Jerry Leiber, Mike Stoller)	October 6, 1967, BBC Playhouse Theatre	2:44
11.	"Fire"	March 28, 1967, BBC Broadcasting House	2:39
12.	"Hoochie Coochie Man" (Willie Dixon)	October 17, 1967, BBC Playhouse Theatre	5:30
13.	"Purple Haze"	March 28, 1967, BBC Broadcasting House	3:02
14.	"Spanish Castle Magic"	December 15, 1967, BBC Playhouse Theatre	3:06
15.	"Hey Joe" (Billy Roberts)	February 13, 1967, BBC Broadcasting House	4:01
16.	"Foxy Lady"	February 13, 1967, BBC Broadcasting House	2:57
17.	"Burning of the Midnight Lamp"	October 6, 1967, BBC Playhouse Theatre	3:42
Total length:			59:12

== Personnel ==
- Jimi Hendrix – guitar, lead vocals
- Noel Redding – bass, backing vocals on track 3
- Mitch Mitchell – drums, backing vocals
- Jimmy Leverton – backing vocals on track 11
- Trevor Burton – backing vocals on track 11
- Alexis Korner – slide guitar on track 12

== See also ==
- BBC Radio 1
