= Live at Winterland =

Live album by The Jimi Hendrix Experience
- Released: 1987
- Recorded: October 10–12, 1968
- Venue: Winterland Ballroom in San Francisco
- Length: 68:12
- Labels: Polydor (UK); Rykodisc (US)
- Producers: Alan Douglas, Chip Branton

The Jimi Hendrix Experience chronology
Band of Gypsys 2 (1986)	Live at Winterland (1987)	Radio One (1988)

Professional ratings
Review scores
Source	Rating
AllMusic	4.5/5 stars
Blender	4/5 stars
The Rolling Stone Album Guide	4/5 stars
Tom Hull – on the Web	B
The Village Voice	A

Live at Winterland is a live album by The Jimi Hendrix Experience. It compiles performances from the band's three concerts at the Winterland Ballroom in San Francisco, where they played two shows each night on October 10, 11 and 12, 1968. The album was released posthumously by Rykodisc in 1987 and was the first Hendrix release to be specifically conceived for the compact disc format.

== Release and reception ==
Live at Winterland was released by Rykodisc in 1987 and became the best-selling album from an independent label that year. With sales of over 200,000 copies, it sold more than any other Jimi Hendrix recording had in years. In a contemporary review for The Village Voice, music critic Robert Christgau was highly impressed by the performances compiled for the album, which he said is ideal for the emerging CD format and surpasses previous live recordings of Hendrix: "The sound is bigger and better in every way for an artist whose sound was his music". He named Live at Winterland the tenth best album of 1987 in his year-end list for The Village Voice. Christgau remarked on its significance to Hendrix's discography in a retrospective review for Blender magazine:

"It's been eclipsed sonically (Berkeley) and conceptually (Woodstock). But this pioneering digitalization, piecing together songs from three San Francisco nights in October 1968 to simulate one uninterrupted concert, redefined posthumous Hendrix and remains a surpassingly realistic live keepsake."

In 1992, Live at Winterland was re-released with a bonus disc, which contained three additional songs from the same concerts. A 4 disc box set (titled Winterland) drawn from all 6 performances was released on September 12, 2011. A limited edition sold exclusively on Amazon.com includes a 5th bonus disc containing a bootleg soundboard recording of a performance at the Fillmore Auditorium on February 4, 1968.

== Track listing ==
All songs were written by Jimi Hendrix, except where noted.

No.	Title	Recording date	Length
1.	"Prologue"	October 11, 1968, 1st show	0:57
2.	"Fire"	October 11, 1968, 2nd show	3:12
3.	"Manic Depression"	October 12, 1968, 2nd show	4:46
4.	"Sunshine of Your Love" (Eric Clapton, Jack Bruce, Pete Brown)	October 10, 1968, 2nd show	6:25
5.	"Spanish Castle Magic"	October 12, 1968, 2nd show	5:32
6.	"Red House"	October 11, 1968, 1st show	11:32
7.	"Killing Floor" (Howlin' Wolf)	October 10, 1968, 2nd show	8:05
8.	"Tax Free" (Bo Hansson, Janne Carlsson)	October 11, 1968, 2nd show	8:00
9.	"Foxy Lady"	October 11, 1968, 2nd show	4:50
10.	"Hey Joe" (Billy Roberts)	October 12, 1968, 1st show	6:44
11.	"Purple Haze"	October 12, 1968, 1st show	4:34
12.	"Wild Thing" (Chip Taylor)	October 12, 1968, 1st show	3:05
13.	"Epilogue"	October 12, 1968, 1st show	0:30

1992 Live at Winterland +3 bonus disc
No.	Title	...	Length
1.	"Are You Experienced"	October 11, 1968, 1st show	13:28
2.	"Voodoo Child (Slight Return)"	October 11, 1968, 1st show	6:43
3.	"Like a Rolling Stone" (Bob Dylan)	October 11, 1968, 2nd show	11:48

== Personnel ==
Credits are adapted from AllMusic.

=== The Jimi Hendrix Experience ===
- Jimi Hendrix – guitar, vocals
- Mitch Mitchell – drums
- Noel Redding – bass guitar, backing vocals on track 2 & 11

=== Additional personnel ===
- Chip Branton – producer
- Jack Casady – bass guitar on track 7
- Alan Douglas – producer
- Mark Linett – engineer

== See also ==
- Jimi Hendrix discography

== Bibliography ==
- "Jimi Hendrix - Live At Winterland + 3 CD Album". CD Universe.
- "Winterland (5 CD Box Set) (Amazon.com Exclusive): Jimi Hendrix Experience: Music". Amazon.
- Christgau, Robert (1987). "Christgau's Consumer Guide". The Village Voice. No. September 29. New York.
- Christgau, Robert (1988). "Pazz & Jop 1987: Dean's List". The Village Voice. No. March 1. New York.
- Christgau, Robert (December 2005). "Back Catalogue: Jimi Hendrix". Blender. New York.
- Evans, Paul; Brackett, Nathan (1992). "Jimi Hendrix". In DeCurtis, Anthony; Henke, James; George-Warren, Holly (eds.). The Rolling Stone Album Guide (3rd ed.). Random House. ISBN 0679737294.
- Morse, Steve (October 30, 1988). "Jimi Hendrix Lives on 'Radio One' Album". The Boston Globe. No. October 30. Boston, MA. Archived from the original on March 11, 2016 – via HighBeam Research.
- Pederson, Jay P. (2007). International Directory of Company Histories. Vol. 83. St. James Press. ISBN 978-1558625877.
- Wynn, Ron (n.d.). "Live at Winterland - Jimi Hendrix, The Jimi Hendrix Experience". AllMusic.
