= Power of Soul: A Tribute to Jimi Hendrix =

Compilation album by various artists
- Released: May 4, 2004
- Genre: Rock
- Label: Image Entertainment
- Producer: Various

Professional ratings
Review scores
Source	Rating
AllMusic	4/5 stars
Boston Globe	(favourable)

Power of Soul: A Tribute to Jimi Hendrix is a 2004 tribute album to Jimi Hendrix. The album reached No. 50 on the Billboard Independent Albums chart.

== Track listing ==
All tracks are written by Jimi Hendrix.

No.	Title	Performer	Length
1.	"Gratitude"	James "Al" Hendrix	0:18
2.	"Are You Experienced?"	Musiq	4:23
3.	"Spanish Castle Magic"	Santana	4:09
4.	"Purple House"	Prince	3:39
5.	"The Wind Cries Mary"	Sting	4:31
6.	"Voodoo Child (Slight Return)"	Earth, Wind & Fire	3:38
7.	"Power of Soul"	Bootsy Collins (featuring George Clinton & the P-Funk All-Stars)	4:48
8.	"Burning of the Midnight Lamp"	Eric Clapton	4:23
9.	"Have You Ever Been (To Electric Ladyland)"	Lenny Kravitz	3:08
10.	"30 Years"	James "Al" Hendrix	0:13
11.	"Who Knows"	Devoted Spirits	3:16
12.	"Purple Haze"	Robert Randolph and the Family Band	4:37
13.	"Going Home"	Velvert Turner	0:43
14.	"Little Wing"	Chaka Khan & Kenny Olson	3:40
15.	"Castles Made of Sand"	Sounds of Blackness	3:06
16.	"May This Be Love"	Eric Gales	4:26
17.	"Foxey Lady"	Cee-Lo	3:40
18.	"Red House"	John Lee Hooker	4:04
19.	"Little Wing/3rd Stone from the Sun (live)"	Stevie Ray Vaughan & Double Trouble	12:28
