= Winterland (The Jimi Hendrix Experience album) =

Live album by the Jimi Hendrix Experience
- Released: September 13, 2011
- Recorded: October 10–12, 1968
- Venues: Winterland Ballroom, San Francisco, California
- Genre: Rock
- Length: 275:46
- Label: Experience Hendrix/Legacy
- Producers: Janie Hendrix; Eddie Kramer; John McDermott

Jimi Hendrix album chronology
West Coast Seattle Boy (2010)	Winterland (2011)	People, Hell and Angels (2013)

Singles from Winterland
- 1. "Like a Rolling Stone" / "Spanish Castle Magic" Released: August 23, 2011

Winterland is a posthumous live box set by the Jimi Hendrix Experience. Released on September 13, 2011, by Experience Hendrix and Legacy Recordings, the four-disc collection documents the band's six performances at the Winterland Ballroom in San Francisco, California between October 10 and 12, 1968. A single disc "highlights" edition was released the same day.

On August 23, 2011, "Like a Rolling Stone" was released as a single, backed with "Spanish Castle Magic". Several of recordings that are included on the box set had been previously released on The Jimi Hendrix Concerts (1982) and Live at Winterland (1987). The Amazon.com exclusive disc five was recorded at the Fillmore Auditorium in San Francisco on February 4, 1968 and was previously released on Paris 1967/San Francisco 1968 (2003).

Professional ratings
Review scores
Source	Rating
AllMusic	4/5 stars
PopMatters	8/10
Rolling Stone	5/5 stars

== Track listing ==
Details taken from the original Experience Hendrix box set notes; other sources may show different information.

All tracks are written by Jimi Hendrix, except where noted.

Disc one: October 10, 1968
No.	Title	Show	Length
1.	"Tax Free" (Bo Hansson, Janne Carlsson)	2nd	15:15
2.	"Lover Man"	2nd	5:21
3.	"Sunshine of Your Love" (Jack Bruce, Eric Clapton, Pete Brown)	2nd	7:30
4.	"Hear My Train A Comin'"	2nd	11:33
5.	"Killing Floor" (Chester Burnett a.k.a. Howlin' Wolf)	2nd	7:55
6.	"Foxey Lady"	1st	5:36
7.	"Hey Joe" (Billy Roberts)	2nd	7:19
8.	"The Star-Spangled Banner" (arr. Hendrix)	2nd	5:56
9.	"Purple Haze"	2nd	5:37
Total length:			72:02

Disc two: October 11, 1968
No.	Title	Show	Length
1.	"Tax Free" (Hansson, Carlsson)	2nd	10:01
2.	"Like a Rolling Stone" (Bob Dylan)	2nd	11:46
3.	"Lover Man"	2nd	3:45
4.	"Hey Joe" (Roberts)	2nd	5:12
5.	"Fire"	2nd	3:20
6.	"Foxey Lady"	2nd	5:12
7.	"Are You Experienced?"	1st	12:13
8.	"Red House"	1st	12:24
9.	"Purple Haze"	2nd	5:18
Total length:			69:11

Disc three: October 12, 1968
No.	Title	Show	Length
1.	"Fire"	1st	4:59
2.	"Lover Man"	1st	4:29
3.	"Like a Rolling Stone" (Dylan)	1st	11:48
4.	"Manic Depression"	2nd	5:34
5.	"Sunshine of Your Love" (Bruce, Clapton, Brown)	2nd	9:01
6.	"Little Wing"	2nd	4:01
7.	"Spanish Castle Magic"	2nd	6:28
8.	"Red House"	2nd	9:13
9.	"Hey Joe" (Roberts)	1st	6:45
10.	"Purple Haze"	1st	3:42
11.	"Wild Thing" (Chip Taylor)	1st	3:30
Total length:			69:30

Disc four: Bonus (mixed)
No.	Title	Date (all 1968)	Length
1.	"Foxey Lady"	October 12, 2nd show	6:05
2.	"Are You Experienced?"	October 10, 1st show	7:27
3.	"Voodoo Child (Slight Return)"	October 10, 1st show	7:43
4.	"Red House"	October 10, 1st show	15:21
5.	"The Star-Spangled Banner" (arr. Hendrix)	October 11, 1st show	6:10
6.	"Purple Haze"	October 11, 1st show	6:13
7.	"Interview at Boston Garden backstage"	November 16	19:04
Total length:			68:03

Amazon.com exclusive disc five: Fillmore Auditorium, San Francisco, California, February 4, 1968
No.	Title	Length
1.	"Killing Floor" (Burnett)	4:06
2.	"Red House"	5:43
3.	"Catfish Blues"	11:44
4.	"Dear Mr. Fantasy (Part one)" (Jim Capaldi, Steve Winwood, Chris Wood)	5:10
5.	"Dear Mr. Fantasy (Part two)" (Capaldi, Winwood, Wood)	6:27
Total length:		33:10

Single disc "highlights" edition
No.	Title	Show (all 1968)	Length
1.	"Fire"	October 12, 1st show	3:30
2.	"Foxey Lady"	October 10, 1st show	5:35
3.	"Like a Rolling Stone" (Dylan)	October 12, 1st show	11:00
4.	"Hey Joe" (Roberts)	October 11, 2nd show	5:00
5.	"Hear My Train a Comin'"	October 10, 2nd show	12:00
6.	"Sunshine of Your Love" (Bruce, Clapton, Brown)	October 10, 2nd show	7:10
7.	"Little Wing"	October 12, 2nd show	3:45
8.	"Are You Experienced?"	October 10, 1st show	7:27
9.	"Manic Depression"	October 12, 2nd show	5:30
10.	"Voodoo Child (Slight Return)"	October 10, 1st show	7:45
11.	"Purple Haze"	October 11, 2nd show	5:20
Total length:			74:02

== Personnel ==
- Jimi Hendrix – vocals, guitar
- Noel Redding – bass guitar, backing vocals
- Mitch Mitchell – drums
- Jack Casady – bass on "Killing Floor" and "Hey Joe" (October 10)
- Virgil Gonsalves – flute on "Are You Experienced?" (October 11)
- Herbie Rich – organ (five songs, October 11)

Exclusive disc five (Fillmore, February 4, 1968)

- Jimi Hendrix – guitar, vocals
- Mitch Mitchell – drums
- Noel Redding – bass guitar
- Buddy Miles – drums on "Dear Mr. Fantasy Part 1 & 2"
