= BBC Sessions (The Jimi Hendrix Experience album) =

Live album by The Jimi Hendrix Experience
- Released: June 2, 1998
- Recorded: 1967, 1969
- Studio: BBC studios
- Genres: Rock; soul; blues
- Length: 107:20
- Label: MCA
- Producers: Janie Hendrix; Eddie Kramer; John McDermott

The Jimi Hendrix Experience chronology
Live at the Oakland Coliseum (1998)	BBC Sessions (1998)	Live at the Fillmore East (1999)

Professional ratings
Review scores
Source	Rating
AllMusic	4/5 stars
Robert Christgau	B+
Rolling Stone	4/5 stars

BBC Sessions is an album of recordings by the rock group the Jimi Hendrix Experience, released on MCA Records on June 2, 1998. It contains all the surviving tracks from their various appearances on BBC radio programmes, such as Saturday Club and Top Gear, recorded in 1967.

At a BBC radio session, a practice still alive in British radio today, a band is required to record material in a studio quickly with limited overdubbing, largely limited to and relying upon their live sound. Many groups as part of this tradition choose to record some songs that are not part of their main repertoire. The album also includes the only two surviving Hendrix UK TV soundtracks (both BBC) Late Night Line Up ("Manic Depression" only survives) and the 1969 A Happening for Lulu (complete). BBC Sessions therefore offers its own unique example of the Experience sound, and a revealing glimpse of a song from their early repertoire Howlin' Wolf's "Killing Floor" and their only known studio recording of Bob Dylan's "Can You Please Crawl Out Your Window?"

Apart from the "live" in studio versions of well-known Experience songs, there are several unique studio recordings of songs, i.e. "Driving South" (three versions), which includes several guitar lines derived from Albert Collins' "Frosty" (1962) and "Thaw Out" (1965), "(I'm Your) Hoochie Coochie Man", "Catfish Blues", "Hound Dog", "Hear My Train A Comin'" (two versions) and a couple of novelty tracks: the amusing parody of a BBC Radio 1 jingle "Radio One", and a recording with a young Stevie Wonder on drums (a cover of Wonder's own "I Was Made to Love Her"). It also includes the sound track from the band's infamous appearance on Lulu's television show in 1969.

This collection has been re-released as part of the Hendrix Family's project to remaster Jimi's discography in 2010 by Experience Hendrix and Legacy Recordings. The re-release contains two digitally remastered sound discs with "Burning of the Midnight Lamp" bonus track from August 24, 1967, and a DVD videodisc of footage from recording sessions, and 22 pages of program notes. Some of this material had previously been released by Rykodisc in 1988 on an album titled Radio One.

== Track listing ==
Details taken from the original Experience Hendrix CD notes; other sources may show different information.

All tracks are written by Jimi Hendrix, except where noted.

Disc one
No.	Title	Recorded	Length
1.	"Foxey Lady"	2/13/67 for Saturday Club	3:00
2.	"Alexis Korner Introduction"		0:28
3.	"Can You Please Crawl Out Your Window?" (Bob Dylan)	10/17/67 for Rhythm and Blues	3:32
4.	"Rhythm and Blues World Service"		0:12
5.	"(I'm Your) Hoochie Coochie Man" (Willie Dixon)	10/17/67 for Rhythm and Blues	5:30
6.	"Traveling with the Experience"		0:22
7.	"Driving South" (Curtis McNear a.k.a. Curtis Knight)	10/17/67 for Top Gear	5:31
8.	"Fire"	3/28/67 for Saturday Club	2:42
9.	"Little Miss Lover"	10/6/67 for Top Gear	2:58
10.	"Introducing the Experience"		0:51
11.	"Burning of the Midnight Lamp"	10/6/67 for Top Gear	3:43
12.	"Catfish Blues" (Robert Petway)	10/6/67 for Top Gear	5:29
13.	"Stone Free"	2/13/67 for Saturday Club	3:26
14.	"Love or Confusion"	2/13/67 for Saturday Club	2:54
15.	"Hey Joe" (Billy Roberts)	2/13/67 for Saturday Club	4:02
16.	"Hound Dog" (Jerry Leiber, Mike Stoller)	10/6/67 for Top Gear	2:43
17.	"Driving South" (McNear)	10/6/67 for Top Gear	4:49
18.	"Hear My Train A Comin'"	12/15/67 for Top Gear	5:00

Disc two
No.	Title	Recorded	Length
1.	"Purple Haze"	3/28/67 for Top of the Pops	3:17
2.	"Killing Floor" (Chester Arthur Burnett a.k.a. Howlin' Wolf)	3/28/67 for Saturday Club	2:28
3.	"Radio One"	12/15/67 for Top Gear	1:34
4.	"Wait Until Tomorrow"	12/15/67 for Top Gear	2:55
5.	"Day Tripper" (Lennon–McCartney)	12/15/67 for Top Gear	3:25
6.	"Spanish Castle Magic"	12/15/67 for Top Gear	3:08
7.	"Jammin'"	10/6/67 for Top Gear	3:24
8.	"I Was Made to Love Her" (Stevie Wonder, Lula Mae Hardaway, Henry Cosby, Sylvia Moy)	10/6/67 for Top Gear	3:05
9.	"Foxey Lady"	2/13/67 for Saturday Club	2:59
10.	"A Brand New Sound"		0:54
11.	"Hey Joe" (Roberts; alternate take)	2/13/67 for Saturday Club	2:58
12.	"Manic Depression"	4/17/67 for Late Night Line-Up	3:11
13.	"Driving South" (McNear; alternate take)	10/6/67 for Top Gear	3:22
14.	"Hear My Train A Comin'" (alternate take)	12/15/67 for Top Gear	5:03
15.	"A Happening for Lulu"	1/4/69 for Happening for Lulu	0:20
16.	"Voodoo Child (Slight Return)"	1/4/69 for Happening for Lulu	4:09
17.	"Lulu Introduction"	1/4/69 for Happening for Lulu	0:23
18.	"Hey Joe" (Roberts)	1/4/69 for Happening for Lulu	2:44
19.	"Sunshine of Your Love" (Pete Brown, Jack Bruce, Eric Clapton)	1/4/69 for Happening for Lulu	1:17
20.	"Burning of the Midnight Lamp" (2010 reissue bonus track)	8/24/67 for Top of the Pops	4:31

== Personnel ==
- Jimi Hendrix – vocals, guitar
- Mitch Mitchell – drums, except "Jammin'" & "I Was Made to Love Her"
- Noel Redding – bass guitar, backing vocals
- Stevie Wonder – drums on "Jammin'" & "I Was Made to Love Her"
- Alexis Korner – slide guitar on "I'm Your Hoochie Coochie Man"

== Peak chart positions ==
- US Billboard 200: No. 50
- UK Albums Chart: No. 42
