= Live at the Hollywood Bowl: August 18, 1967 =

Live album by the Jimi Hendrix Experience
- Released: November 10, 2023
- Recorded: August 18, 1967
- Venue: Hollywood Bowl
- Genre: Rock
- Length: 43:10
- Label: Legacy Recordings
- Producer: Janie Hendrix; Eddie Kramer; John McDermott

The Jimi Hendrix Experience chronology
Los Angeles Forum: April 26, 1969 (2022)	Live at the Hollywood Bowl: August 18, 1967 (2023)

Singles from Live at the Hollywood Bowl: August 18, 1967
- 1. "Killing Floor" Released: 19 September 2023; 2. "Sgt. Pepper's Lonely Hearts Club Band" Released: 13 October 2023

Live at the Hollywood Bowl: August 18, 1967 is a live album by The Jimi Hendrix Experience. It was released on November 10, 2023, 56 years after it was first recorded.

== Background ==
On August 18, 1967, three months and five days after the release of Are You Experienced, the Jimi Hendrix Experience opened for The Mamas & the Papas during their concert at the Hollywood Bowl and played 10 songs, including cover versions of the Beatles' "Sgt. Pepper's Lonely Hearts Club Band", Bob Dylan's "Like a Rolling Stone" and Howlin' Wolf's "Killing Floor". all of the songs on the album had previously been unreleased. According to Redding, the band didn't do very well during the performance, which he described in his biography as them "Having flopped so dismally".

== Release ==
The album was released on November 10, 2023, and includes photos from the performance and liner notes written by Jeff Slate.

== Reception ==
Professional ratings
Review scores
Source	Rating
Classic Rock	3.5/5 stars

Louder Sound critic Julian Marszalek commented that it "is the sound of the future fighting against the odds."

== Track listing ==
All tracks are written by Jimi Hendrix, except where noted.

No.	Title	Writer(s)	Length
1.	"Introduction"		0:58
2.	"Sgt. Pepper's Lonely Hearts Club Band"	Lennon–McCartney	1:54
3.	"Killing Floor"	Howlin' Wolf	4:20
4.	"The Wind Cries Mary"		3:34
5.	"Foxey Lady"		3:41
6.	"Catfish Blues"	Robert Petway	8:13
7.	"Fire"		3:05
8.	"Like a Rolling Stone"	Bob Dylan	6:47
9.	"Purple Haze"		4:11
10.	"Wild Thing"	Chip Taylor	6:14
Total length:			42:58

== Chart ==
Chart performance for Los Angeles Forum: April 26, 1969
Chart (2023)	Peak position
Austrian Albums (Ö3 Austria)	24

== Sources ==
- McDermott, John; Kramer, Eddie; Cox, Billy (2009). Ultimate Hendrix. Milwaukee, Wisconsin: Backbeat Books. ISBN 978-0-87930-938-1.
- Redding, Noel; Appleby, Carol (1990). Are You Experienced? The Inside Story of the Jimi Hendrix Experience. London: Picador. ISBN 0-330-31923-X.
