= The Singles Album (Jimi Hendrix album) =

Greatest hits album by Jimi Hendrix
- Released: 1983
- Genre: Rock
- Length: 89:56
- Label: Polydor

Jimi Hendrix UK album chronology
The Jimi Hendrix Concerts (1982)	The Singles Album (1983)	Kiss the Sky (1984)

Singles from The Singles Album
- 1. "Purple Haze" Released: 1983; 2. "All Along the Watchtower" Released: 1983

Professional ratings
Review scores
Source	Rating
AllMusic	3.5/5 stars

The Singles Album compiles all of the singles released by the Jimi Hendrix Experience and Jimi Hendrix up to the 1979 release of "Gloria". It was issued only in Europe in February 1983 as a two-LP set, and on cassette. It was released as a two-CD set in 1985, digitally engineered in London by Carlos Olms.

== Track listing ==
All songs are by Jimi Hendrix, except where noted.

=== Disc one ===
1. "Hey Joe" (William Roberts) -3:25
2. "Stone Free" - 3:34
3. "Purple Haze" - 2:45
4. "51st Anniversary" - 3:14 (Mono)
5. "The Wind Cries Mary" - 3:16
6. "Highway Chile" - 3:28 (Mono)
7. "The Burning of the Midnight Lamp" - 3:36
8. "The Stars That Play with Laughing Sam's Dice" - 4:17 (Mono)
9. "All Along the Watchtower" (Bob Dylan) - 3:58
10. "Long Hot Summer Night" - 3:25
11. "Cross Town Traffic" - 2:18
12. "Let Me Light Your Fire" - 2:38

=== Disc two ===
1. "Voodoo Child (Slight Return)" - 5:12
2. "Angel" - 4:15
3. "Night Bird Flying" - 3:51
4. "Gypsy Eyes" - 3:41
5. "Remember" - 2:44 (Mono enhanced for stereo)
6. "Johnny B. Goode" (Live) (Chuck Berry) - 4:03
7. "Little Wing" (Live) - 3:15
8. "Foxy Lady" - 3:10
9. "Manic Depression" - 3:35
10. "3rd Stone From The Sun" - 6:38
11. "Gloria" (Van Morrison) - 8:45
