= Kiss the Sky (Jimi Hendrix album) =

Compilation album by Jimi Hendrix
- Released: October 15, 1984
- Recorded: 1966–1970
- Genre: Rock
- Length: 45:58
- Label: Polydor (UK); Reprise (US)
- Compiler: Kevin Laffey; Chip Branton; Alan Douglas

Jimi Hendrix US album chronology
The Jimi Hendrix Concerts (1982)	Kiss the Sky (1984)	Jimi Plays Monterey (1986)

Jimi Hendrix UK album chronology
The Singles Album (1983)	Kiss the Sky (1984)	Johnny B. Goode (1986)

Kiss the Sky is a compilation album by American rock guitarist, singer–songwriter Jimi Hendrix. In the US, it was released by Reprise Records in October 1984 and by Polydor Records in the UK in November 1984. The album's title is taken from the lyrics of "Purple Haze".

"Red House" is listed in the liner notes as the "unedited version", which amounted to a few seconds of studio chat that preceded the song. "Stepping Stone" is believed to be the original Band of Gypsys single mix. "Killing Floor" from the 1967 Monterey Pop Festival was unreleased at the time.

The front cover artwork of the 1984 CD release on Reprise noted "Digitally remastered from original vault tapes", while the Reprise cassette cover artwork stated "Special Edition Jimi Hendrix album. Digitally remastered from original vault tapes. Audiophile recording on high-quality cassette".

A music video of "Are You Experienced?" aired on MTV in conjunction with the album's release.

Professional ratings
Review scores
Source	Rating
AllMusic	3.5/5 stars

== Track listing ==
All songs are written by Jimi Hendrix, except where noted.

1. "Are You Experienced?" – 4:15 (Are You Experienced, 1967)
2. "I Don't Live Today" (live) – 6:43 (The Jimi Hendrix Concerts, 1982)
3. "Voodoo Child (Slight Return)" – 5:14 (Electric Ladyland, 1968)
4. "Stepping Stone" – 4:11 (single, 1970)
5. "Castles Made of Sand" – 2:49 (Axis: Bold as Love, 1967)
6. "Killing Floor" (live) (Chester Burnett) – 3:32 (previously unreleased)
7. "Purple Haze" – 2:53 (Are You Experienced, US edition)
8. "Red House" – 3:57 (Smash Hits, US edition)
9. "Crosstown Traffic" – 2:20 (Electric Ladyland)
10. "Third Stone from the Sun" – 6:46 (Are You Experienced)
11. "All Along the Watchtower" (Bob Dylan) – 3:58 (Electric Ladyland)

== Personnel ==
- Jimi Hendrix – guitar, lead vocals, backing vocals on "Crosstown Traffic", bass guitar on "All Along the Watchtower"
- Noel Redding – bass guitar
- Mitch Mitchell – drums
- Billy Cox – bass guitar on "Stepping Stone"
- Buddy Miles – drums on "Stepping Stone"

== Recording details ==
- "I Don't Live Today" recorded at the San Diego Sports Arena, San Diego on May 24, 1969
- "Killing Floor" recorded at the Monterey Pop Festival on June 18, 1967
