= Velvert Turner =

- Born: October 12, 1951; Brooklyn, New York, United States
- Died: December 11, 2000 (aged 49) Brooklyn, New York, United States
- Genres: Psychedelic rock; hard rock; acid rock
- Occupations: Musician
- Instruments: Electric guitar, vocals
- Years active: 1970–1977
- Labels: Phillips; Tiger Lily

Velvert Turner (October 12, 1951 – December 11, 2000) was an American guitarist, and vocalist of the psychedelic rock band, The Velvert Turner Group. Turner and his work have gained a cult following as Turner is known as the lone understudy of the guitarist Jimi Hendrix. Turner's recording career was brief, but his lone album has become highly collectable for its resemblance to the style of his mentor.

== Biography ==
Turner was born on October 12, 1951, in Brooklyn, New York. At an early age, Turner had a profound interest in the guitar, and constantly practiced with it. In 1966, Turner met Hendrix while he was in Brooklyn, and the two became friends when they realized their mutual passion for the electric guitar. Hendrix took Turner under his wing, mentoring him through instructional sessions, and personal advice in Hendrix's apartment on 302 West 12th Street. Since Hendrix was left-handed, during Turner's lessons he studied Hendrix's technique through a mirror to accommodate to his unorthodox style. Turner would regularly be invited to Hendrix's performances, and Turner boasted to his friends of knowing the guitarist as his recognition reached a national scale. All but one regarded Turner's statements as mere lies, the one believing him being Richard Lloyd, later the guitarist of the band, Television. Through Turner, Lloyd was taught how to emulate the style and guitar licks of Hendrix, and the two became good friends.

After the death of Jimi Hendrix, Turner sought to establish his own music career by forming his own band, The Velvert Turner Group. The band was composed of Turner on lead guitar and as lead vocalist, Prescott Niles on bass guitar, Christopher Robinson on keyboards, and Tim McGovern on drums. Turner even resembled Hendrix, sporting an afro and wearing colorful clothing in concerts. Performance-wise, Turner was also known to play behind his back or with his teeth. In 1972, Tom Wilson pursued the opportunity to record the band for their debut album on the Phillips label. The group's debut album, Velvert Turner Group, reflects the guitar playing of Hendrix's later work, and Turner even produced vocals similar to Hendrix. All of the tracks were original material, except for the final song on the album, a cover version of the Hendrix song, "Freedom". Even the back cover of the album features a fish-eye view image, reminiscent of The Jimi Hendrix Experience's debut album, Are You Experienced?. The group failed to make the national charts, and the band broke up soon after. Turner's former bandmates reappeared in groups including The Knack, The Motels, Burning Sensations, and The New York Dolls.

Turner sporadically performed in solo and collaborative tours thereafter. In 1977, Turner played guitar on three tracks for the Arthur Lee solo effort, Arthur Lee. In the mid-1980s Turner narrated an instructional video depicting the playing style of Jimi Hendrix. Turner did not perform any chords as they were played by Andy Aledort. For the latter portion of Turner's life, he worked in Samatarian Village in Brooklyn. He mainly dealt with supporting those struggling with substance abuse. On the morning of December 11, 2000, Turner died at the age of 49. Turner was featured on the 2004 Hendrix tribute album, Power of Soul: A Tribute to Jimi Hendrix, in a 43-second guitar solo titled, "Going Home". Lloyd, in 2009, produced a tribute album called The Jamie Neverts Story in memoriam to Turner and Hendrix. Jamie Neverts was the code-name used when he and Turner were speaking of Hendrix. The front cover art of the album is an altered version of Turner's debut album.

== Discography ==
- The Velvert Turner Group – Phillips (#6369), 1972
- Arthur Lee – Rhino (#RNLP 020), 1977 (featured on tracks A1, B1, B3)
- Power of Soul: A Tribute to Jimi Hendrix – Experience Hendrix (#D1704-2012-1), 2004 (appears on "Going Home")
