= Valleys of Neptune =

Compilation album by Jimi Hendrix
- Released: March 5, 2010
- Recorded: 1967–1970, 1987
- Genre: Rock
- Length: 62:11
- Label: Legacy
- Producers: Jimi Hendrix; Chas Chandler; Janie Hendrix; Eddie Kramer; John McDermott

Jimi Hendrix chronology
Live at Woburn (2009)	Valleys of Neptune (2010)	West Coast Seattle Boy: The Jimi Hendrix Anthology (2010)

Singles from Valleys of Neptune
- 1. "Valleys of Neptune" Released: February 9, 2010; 2. "Bleeding Heart" Released: March 1, 2010

Valleys of Neptune is a posthumous compilation album by the American rock musician Jimi Hendrix. Released in the United States on March 9, 2010, the album was promoted as having "12 previously unreleased studio recordings", including the title track, "one of the most sought after of all of Hendrix's commercially unavailable recordings"; and as including "the original Jimi Hendrix Experience's final studio recordings".

The tracks on Valleys of Neptune were largely self-produced by Hendrix, and received extra posthumous production from Janie Hendrix, Eddie Kramer and John McDermott. Recorded mostly in 1969 following the release of Electric Ladyland, the album predominantly features the original line-up of the Jimi Hendrix Experience: vocalist and guitarist Hendrix, bass guitarist Noel Redding and drummer Mitch Mitchell. The lead single released from the album was "Valleys of Neptune", on February 1, 2010, followed by "Bleeding Heart" on March 1; music videos were produced for both songs.

== Background ==
The majority of the tracks on Valleys of Neptune were recorded in early 1969, while Hendrix was experimenting with songs for his unfinished fourth album, following the successful release of Electric Ladyland in September 1968.

By the time Valleys of Neptune was released, numerous versions of its tracks had already been released, both officially and otherwise, including the majority of the "previously unreleased" recordings, albeit sometimes in inferior quality or different versions. For example, the original recording of "Trash Man" is here on Valleys of Neptune; a version of "Trash Man" had been released on the 1975 album Midnight Lightning, but truncated at beginning and end, and with Mitchell's and Redding's drums and bass guitar removed and replaced by that of session musicians.

== Album cover ==
The album artwork is based on a painting by Hendrix himself in 1957. "He went through a phase doing watercolors at school and this was one of the 110 drawings of his that our father kept. When I saw this one he did in 1957, it screamed 'Valleys of Neptune' to me so we knew we'd use it for this project," said his step-sister, Janie. The album artwork is a mix of his painting and a Linda McCartney photograph of him with a blue tint.

== Critical reception ==
Professional ratings
Review scores
Source	Rating
AllMusic	3/5 stars
The A.V. Club	B−
Chicago Tribune	3/4 stars
Entertainment Weekly	B−
Filter	93/100
Los Angeles Times	2.5/4 stars
PopMatters	7/10
Q	3/5 stars
Rolling Stone	3.5/5 stars
Spin	7/10

Valleys of Neptune received generally positive reviews from critics. At Metacritic, which assigns a normalized rating out of 100 to reviews from mainstream publications, it received an average score of 68, based on 15 reviews. In Rolling Stone, critic Will Hermes found the music beautiful and exciting, while writing, "Are these tracks 'finished' as Hendrix would've intended? Probably not. But as a glimpse of the guitarist extending his reach beyond the Experience trio, it's thrilling.". Greg Kot, writing for the Chicago Tribune, called it "a sharp snapshot of a musical genius in the studio during a period of transition". Ludovic Hunter-Tilney from the Financial Times called the album "a cut above the many posthumous cash-ins released in [Hendrix's] name."

In the Los Angeles Times, Ann Powers was less enthusiastic and felt "fans will be fascinated by these bluesy riffs with the Experience, but this album of unreleased material from the archives doesn't convey much that was unknown." Q found it "lighter sonically" than Hendrix's better known work and ultimately of "limited appeal".

== Track listing ==
All tracks are written by Jimi Hendrix, except where noted.

No.	Title	Recording date(s) and studio(s)	Length
1.	"Stone Free" (previously unreleased alternate recording)	April 7, 9, 14 and May 17, 1969, at Record Plant Studios	3:48
2.	"Valleys of Neptune"	September 23, 1969, and May 15, 1970, at Record Plant	4:05
3.	"Bleeding Heart" (Elmore James)	April 24, 1969, at Record Plant	6:23
4.	"Hear My Train A Comin'"	April 7, 1969, at Record Plant	7:32
5.	"Mr. Bad Luck"	May 5, 1967, at Olympic Studios; June 5, 1987, at AIR Studios	2:58
6.	"Sunshine of Your Love" (Jack Bruce, Eric Clapton, Pete Brown)	February 16, 1969, at Olympic	6:48
7.	"Lover Man"	February 16, 1969, at Olympic; June 5, 1987, at AIR	4:17
8.	"Ships Passing Through the Night"	April 14, 1969, at Record Plant	5:54
9.	"Fire" (rehearsal version)	February 17, 1969, at Olympic	3:14
10.	"Red House" (rehearsal version)	February 17, 1969, at Olympic	8:22
11.	"Lullaby for the Summer"	April 7, 1969, at Record Plant	3:51
12.	"Crying Blue Rain"	February 16, 1969, at Olympic; June 5, 1987, at AIR	4:59
Total length:			62:11

Target bonus tracks
No.	Title	Recording date and studio	Length
13.	"Slow Version"	April 3, 1969, at Olmstead Studios	4:58
14.	"Trash Man"	February 14, 1969, at Olympic	7:27
Total length:			74:36

=== Notes ===
- The recording of "Hear My Train A Comin’" that appears here was last demo to feature Noel Redding on bass before he was replaced by Billy Cox.
- "Ships Passing Through the Night" is an early demo of "Night Bird Flying".

== Personnel ==
Primary musicians

- Jimi Hendrix – vocals, guitars, production on all tracks except 5, front cover painting
- Mitch Mitchell – drums on all tracks except 3
- Noel Redding – bass guitar on all tracks except 1, 2 and 3, backing vocals on track 9
- Billy Cox – bass guitar on tracks 1, 2 and 3

Additional musicians

- Rocky Dzidzornu – percussion on tracks 6 and 12
- Roger Chapman – backing vocals on track 1
- Andy Fairweather Low – backing vocals on track 1
- Juma Sultan – percussion on track 2
- Rocky Isaac – drums on track 3
- Chris Grimes – tambourine on track 3
- Al Marks – maracas on track 3

Original production personnel

- Eddie Kramer – posthumous production, mixing, engineering on tracks 1, 2, 5 and 14
- Chas Chandler – production on track 5
- George Chkiantz – engineering on tracks 6, 7, 9, 10, 12 and 13
- Gary Kellgren – engineering on tracks 1, 3 and 8
- Jack Adams – engineering on track 2

Posthumous production personnel

- Janie Hendrix – production
- John McDermott – production, essay
- Chandler Harrod – engineering assistance
- Rick Kwan – additional engineering
- Derik Lee – additional engineering
- Charlie Stavish – additional engineering
- Aaron Walk – additional engineering
- George Marino – mastering

Graphic personnel

- Phil Yarnall – graphic design
- Linda McCartney – front cover photography
- James Davenport – back cover photography, booklet photography
- Jerry Schatzberg – booklet photography
- Jonathan Stathakis – booklet photography
- Graham F. Page – booklet photography
- John Sullivan – booklet photography
- Ulvis Alberts – booklet photography
- Willis Hogan Jr. – booklet photography
- Peter Riches – booklet photography

== Charts ==
=== Weekly charts ===
Chart (2010)	Peak position
Australian Albums (ARIA)	8
Austrian Albums (Ö3 Austria)	6
Belgian Albums (Ultratop Flanders)	6
Belgian Albums (Ultratop Wallonia)	7
Canadian Albums (Billboard)	2
Danish Albums (Hitlisten)	13
Dutch Albums (Album Top 100)	4
Finnish Albums (Suomen virallinen lista)	5
French Albums (SNEP)	6
German Albums (Offizielle Top 100)	34
Hungarian Albums (MAHASZ)	11
Irish Albums (IRMA)	32
Italian Albums (FIMI)	5
New Zealand Albums (RMNZ)	3
Norwegian Albums (VG-lista)	17
Polish Albums (ZPAV)	23
Portuguese Albums (AFP)	5
Spanish Albums (Promusicae)	23
Swedish Albums (Sverigetopplistan)	7
Swiss Albums (Schweizer Hitparade)	8
UK Albums (Official Charts)	21
US Billboard 200	4
US Top Hard Rock Albums (Billboard)	1
US Top Rock Albums (Billboard)	1
US Indie Store Album Sales (Billboard)	1

=== Year-end charts ===
Chart (2010)	Position
Belgian Albums (Ultratop Flanders)	82
Dutch Albums (Album Top 100)	70
French Albums (SNEP)	150
US Billboard 200	124
US Top Rock Albums (Billboard)	31

== Certifications ==
Region	Certification	Certified units/sales
Netherlands (NVPI)	Platinum	50,000^{^}
^{^} Shipments figures based on certification alone.
