= Stages (Jimi Hendrix album) =

Live album by Jimi Hendrix
- Released: November 1991
- Recorded: 1967–1970
- Venues: Olympia (Paris); San Diego Sports Arena (San Diego, California); Atlanta Pop 1970 (Byron, Georgia)
- Studio: Radiohuset (Stockholm)
- Genre: Rock
- Length: 197:19
- Label: Reprise
- Producers: Alan Douglas, Bruce Gary

Jimi Hendrix chronology
| Cornerstones: 1967–1970 (1990) | Stages (1991) | Live Isle of Wight '70 (1991) |

Stages is a four-CD box set consisting of live performances by Jimi Hendrix covering four years of his career. Disc one is the complete September 5, 1967, concert in Stockholm. Disc two is the complete January 29, 1968 (late show) concert in Paris; this was later released on Dagger Records as part of Live in Paris & Ottawa 1968. Disc three is most of the May 24, 1969, concert in San Diego with "Foxey Lady" missing from the set. Disc four is a majority of the July 4, 1970, concert at the Atlanta International Pop Festival with five songs missing from the set. These additional five songs can be found on the album Freedom: Atlanta Pop Festival, which also presents the performance in the correct playing order.

Stages was released in November 1991 on Reprise Records, and is currently out of print.

== Critical reception ==
Professional ratings
Review scores
| Source | Rating |
|---|---|
| AllMusic | 3/5 stars |

In a retrospective review for AllMusic, critic Greg Prato gave the album three out of five stars. He described the recording quality "crystal clear":

The four discs are an obviously interesting musical journey, showing the rapid musical transformation of Hendrix from showman to serious virtuoso. And although there is a bit of overlap on the discs ("Purple Haze" rears its head on all four), the versions of the repeated songs are strikingly different.

== Track listing ==
All tracks written by Jimi Hendrix except where noted.

Stockholm '67
| No. | Title | Length |
|---|---|---|
| 1. | "Sgt. Pepper's Lonely Hearts Club Band" (Lennon-McCartney) | 1:58 |
| 2. | "Fire" | 3:11 |
| 3. | "The Wind Cries Mary" | 3:58 |
| 4. | "Foxy Lady" | 3:48 |
| 5. | "Hey Joe" (Billy Roberts) | 4:13 |
| 6. | "I Don't Live Today" | 4:43 |
| 7. | "Burning of the Midnight Lamp" | 4:17 |
| 8. | "Purple Haze" | 5:27 |
| Total length: | | 31:35 |

Paris '68
| No. | Title | Length |
|---|---|---|
| 1. | "Killin' Floor" (Howlin' Wolf) | 4:28 |
| 2. | "Catfish Blues" (Muddy Waters) | 8:49 |
| 3. | "Foxy Lady" | 5:22 |
| 4. | "Red House" | 4:35 |
| 5. | "Drivin' South" (Curtis Knight) | 9:00 |
| 6. | "The Wind Cries Mary" | 4:08 |
| 7. | "Fire" | 4:00 |
| 8. | "Little Wing" | 4:15 |
| 9. | "Purple Haze" | 5:53 |
| Total length: | | 50:30 |

San Diego '69
| No. | Title | Length |
|---|---|---|
| 1. | "Intro Riffs" | 4:25 |
| 2. | "Fire" | 4:01 |
| 3. | "Hey Joe" (Roberts) | 5:16 |
| 4. | "Spanish Castle Magic" / "Sunshine of Your Love" (Pete Brown, Jack Bruce, Eric Clapton) | 10:52 |
| 5. | "Red House" | 13:42 |
| 6. | "I Don't Live Today" | 7:04 |
| 7. | "Purple Haze" | 4:50 |
| 8. | "Voodoo Child (Slight Return)" | 10:20 |
| Total length: | | 60:30 |

Atlanta '70
| No. | Title | Length |
|---|---|---|
| 1. | "Fire" | 4:35 |
| 2. | "Lover Man" | 2:59 |
| 3. | "Spanish Castle Magic" | 5:07 |
| 4. | "Foxy Lady" | 4:30 |
| 5. | "Purple Haze" | 3:54 |
| 6. | "Hear My Train A Comin'" | 10:30 |
| 7. | "Stone Free" | 5:25 |
| 8. | "Star-Spangled Banner" (trad. arr. Hendrix) | 2:47 |
| 9. | "Straight Ahead" | 4:36 |
| 10. | "Room Full of Mirrors" | 3:12 |
| 11. | "Voodoo Child (Slight Return)" | 7:09 |
| Total length: | | 54:44 |

== Personnel ==
=== Musicians ===
Stockholm '67, Paris '68, San Diego '69 – The Jimi Hendrix Experience:

- Jimi Hendrix – guitar, vocals
- Mitch Mitchell – drums
- Noel Redding – bass guitar

Atlanta '70 – The Cry of Love Tour band:

- Jimi Hendrix – guitar, vocals
- Mitch Mitchell – drums
- Billy Cox – bass guitar, backing vocals

=== Production ===
- Producer: Alan Douglas
- Associate Producer: Bruce Gary
- Project Consultant: Michael Fairchild
- Mixing Engineer: Mark Linett (San Diego '69 & Atlanta '70)
- Assistant Engineer: Michael Kloster (San Diego '69 & Atlanta '70)
- Mixed At: Sunset Sound
- Mastering: Joe Gastwirt at Ocean View Digital
- Album Notes: Michael Fairchild
- Photography: Jim Marshall (Stockholm '67), Jean-Pierre Leloir (Paris '68), Barry Wentzell/Repfoto (San Diego '69), Joe Sia (Atlanta '70)
- Art Direction: Jeff Gold, Deborah Norcross
- Design: Deborah Norcross
