= Live at Berkeley =

Live album by Jimi Hendrix
- Released: September 16, 2003
- Recorded: May 30, 1970
- Venue: Berkeley Community Theatre, Berkeley, California
- Genre: Rock
- Length: 67:47
- Label: MCA
- Producer: Abe Jacob

Jimi Hendrix chronology
Martin Scorsese Presents the Blues: Jimi Hendrix (2003)	Live at Berkeley (2003)	The Singles Collection (2003)

Live at Berkeley is a live album by American rock musician Jimi Hendrix. It documents his second performance at the Berkeley Community Theatre on May 30, 1970, and was released by MCA Records on September 16, 2003.

== Background ==
Hendrix performed in Berkeley about one month into his The Cry of Love Tour with bassist Billy Cox and drummer Mitch Mitchell. The set list was fairly typical for the tour – a mix of popular tunes and some newer material. "Hey Joe", "Foxey Lady", "Purple Haze", and "Voodoo Child (Slight Return)" had been in Hendrix's concert repertoire since he first recorded them. "Machine Gun" was released two months earlier on the live Band of Gypsys album, and "Hey Baby (New Rising Sun)" was in development for his planned fourth studio album. Portions of some of these songs were included in the 1971 concert film Jimi Plays Berkeley.

== Critical reception ==
Professional ratings
Review scores
Source	Rating
About.com	4.5/5 stars
All About Jazz	4/5 stars
AllMusic	3/5 stars
Blender	3/5 stars
Q	3/5 stars
Tom Hull – on the Web	A−
Uncut	4/5 stars

Rob Fawcett of BBC Music called Live at Berkeley "the strongest newly-released Hendrix material in a long time". Robert Christgau cited "Hey Baby (New Rising Sun)" and "I Don't Live Today" as highlights and deemed it "the Cox-Mitchell band at its most documentable" in his consumer guide for The Village Voice. In his review for Blender, he said Cox was a significant improvement over Noel Redding in a group that was Hendrix's best. Uncut magazine was less enthusiastic and felt "there are still better versions of these tracks elsewhere."

== Track listing ==
All tracks are written by Jimi Hendrix, except where noted.

No.	Title	Length
1.	"Introduction"	1:47
2.	"Pass It On (Straight Ahead)"	6:58
3.	"Hey Baby (New Rising Sun)"	6:07
4.	"Lover Man"	2:59
5.	"Stone Free"	4:08
6.	"Hey Joe" (Billy Roberts)	4:49
7.	"I Don't Live Today"	5:26
8.	"Machine Gun"	11:22
9.	"Foxy Lady"	6:30
10.	"The Star Spangled Banner" (Francis Scott Key, John Stafford Smith)	2:45
11.	"Purple Haze"	3:48
12.	"Voodoo Child (Slight Return)"	10:49
Total length:		67:28

== Personnel ==
Musicians

- Jimi Hendrix – guitar, vocals
- Billy Cox – bass guitar
- Mitch Mitchell – drums

Production

- Janie L. Hendrix – compilation production
- Eddie Kramer – compilation production, mixing
- George Marino – mastering
- John McDermott – compilation production
- Pete Scriba – assistant engineering
