= Bleeding Heart (song) =

Song written by Elmore James

Single by Elmore James
- A-side: "It Hurts Me Too" (1st pressing); "Mean Mistreatin' Mama" (2nd pressing)
- Released: April 1965
- Recorded: late February – early March 1961
- Studio: Beltone, New York City
- Genre: Blues
- Length: 2:37
- Label: Enjoy
- Songwriter: Elmore James
- Producer: Bobby Robinson

"Bleeding Heart" (sometimes listed as "(My) Bleeding Heart") is a song written and recorded by American blues musician Elmore James in 1961. Considered "among the greatest of James' songs", "Bleeding Heart" was later popularized by Jimi Hendrix, who recorded several versions of the song.

== Original song ==
"Bleeding Heart" is a slow-tempo twelve-bar blues that features Elmore James' vocal and slide guitar. It was recorded during one of his last recording sessions and has session musicians providing accompaniment, instead of James' regular band, the "Broomdusters." According to producer Bobby Robinson, it was his idea to record James with a "big band sound" and to hire band leader Paul Williams to arrange the horn section. The song contains some of James' more memorable verses:

People, people, people, you know what it means to be left alone (2×)
No letter today, not even a call on my telephone ...
Misunderstanding and a no-good woman
They have both caused my heart to bleed

Although recorded in 1961, "Bleeding Heart" was not released until 1965, two years after James' death. It was first issued as the B-side to the first pressing of "It Hurts Me Too," which became a Billboard R&B chart hit and appeared in the pop chart. "Bleeding Heart" was later released with "Mean Mistreatin' Mama." These single versions were edited to 2:37; a 3:05 version later appeared on the Elmore James Memorial Album and various compilation albums, sometimes titled "(My) Bleeding Heart."

Personnel

- Elmore James – vocals, slide guitar
- Paul "Hucklebuck" Williams – baritone saxophone
- George Coleman (probably) – tenor saxophone
- Danny Moore – trumpet
- Dickie Harris (probably) – trombone
- Nehemiah "Riff" Ruffin – guitar
- Johnny Acey – piano
- Unknown – bass
- Johnny or Earl Williams – drums

== Jimi Hendrix's version ==
"Bleeding Heart"

Single by Jimi Hendrix

from the album Valleys of Neptune
- B-side: "Peace in Mississippi" (single); "Jam 292" (alternative single)
- Released: March 1, 2010 (digital); March 8, 2010 (record)
- Recorded: April 24, 1969
- Studio: Record Plant, New York City
- Genre: Funk rock
- Length: 6:20
- Label: Legacy
- Songwriter: Elmore James
- Producer: Jimi Hendrix

Jimi Hendrix singles chronology
"Valleys of Neptune" (2010)	"Bleeding Heart" (2010)	"Love or Confusion" (2010)

=== Background and performances ===
Jimi Hendrix, who frequently cited Elmore James as an influence, recorded several different arrangements of "Bleeding Heart". An early performance with Hendrix on vocals and guitar, which follows James' version, was recorded with Curtis Knight and the Squires in 1965 or 1966. In 1968, a live version of the song was recorded at a jam session at the Scene Club in New York and later released on several bootleg and gray-market albums, including Bleeding Heart. Hendrix used some new lyrics, but the performance was marred by "a very drunken Jim Morrison ... burbling a combination of lyrics and obscenities over the jamming musicians" for half of the song.

On February 24, 1969, a live version was performed by the Jimi Hendrix Experience at the Royal Albert Hall for possible inclusion in a concert film. The film has not been released, although "Bleeding Heart" appeared on a purported soundtrack album, Experience. Hendrix with the Band of Gypsys recorded a live version of "Bleeding Heart" on December 31, 1969 at the Fillmore East in New York. It appears on Machine Gun: The Fillmore East First Show (2016).

=== Studio versions ===
In 1969, Hendrix recorded at least three different studio arrangements of "Bleeding Heart" at the Record Plant in New York that showed Hendrix moving away from an Elmore James-style blues arrangement and using different backing musicians – a more modern blues recorded March 18 appeared on Blues; an uptempo version recorded April 24 that is featured on his 2010 posthumous studio album Valleys of Neptune; and a slower funk-influenced version recorded May 21 which is included on People, Hell and Angels.

With Billy Cox and Mitch Mitchell, the basic track for a new studio version, which moved further away from the blues, was completed March 24, 1970, at the Record Plant, with additional recording at the recently finished Electric Lady Studios in June 1970. Further developments to the song were made, and Hendrix and engineer Eddie Kramer prepared a rough mix. This version was later remixed by Kramer and released on the 1972 album War Heroes and later on South Saturn Delta in 1997.

=== Single and music video ===
The Valleys of Neptune version was released as the second single from the album on March 1 (digital download) and March 8, 2010 (7-inch single) and is backed with a previously unreleased version of the song "Peace in Mississippi." An alternative single that includes "Jam 292" from the Dagger Records album Hear My Music (2004) was released. The music video for "Bleeding Heart," directed by Julien Temple, debuted on Spotify on February 25, 2010.

Personnel

Single version

- Jimi Hendrix – vocals, guitars, production
- Billy Cox – bass guitar
- Rocky Isaac – drums
- Chris Grimes – tambourine
- Al Marks – maracas
