= The Jimi Hendrix Concerts =

Live album by Jimi Hendrix
- Released: August 1982
- Recorded: 1968–1970
- Genre: Rock
- Length: 77:41
- Label: Polydor (UK); Reprise (US)
- Producer: Alan Douglas

Jimi Hendrix US album chronology
Nine to the Universe (1980)	The Jimi Hendrix Concerts (1982)	Kiss the Sky (1984)

Jimi Hendrix UK album chronology
Stone Free (1981)	The Jimi Hendrix Concerts (1982)	The Singles Album (1983)

Professional ratings
Review scores
Source	Rating
AllMusic	4/5 stars
The Village Voice	B+

The Jimi Hendrix Concerts is a posthumous live album by Jimi Hendrix, released in 1982. The album contains eleven songs from six different concerts between 1968 and 1970.

The album spent eleven weeks in the UK Albums Chart, peaking at number 16. In the United States, it was less successful, reaching number 79 in the Billboard 200.

The 1989 re-release of the album on compact disc included a previously unreleased 12th track, "Foxey Lady".

== Track listing ==
All tracks are written by Jimi Hendrix, except where noted.

No.	Title	Recording date and location	Length
1.	"Fire"	October 12, 1968, Winterland Arena (1st show)	3:43
2.	"I Don't Live Today"	May 24, 1969, San Diego Sports Arena	6:50
3.	"Red House"	July 17, 1970, New York Pop Festival	8:45
4.	"Stone Free"	February 24, 1969, Royal Albert Hall	10:39
5.	"Are You Experienced?"	October 10, 1968, Winterland Arena (1st show)	6:46
6.	"Little Wing"	October 12, 1968, Winterland Arena (2nd show)	3:54
7.	"Voodoo Chile"	October 10, 1968, Winterland Arena (1st show)	7:10
8.	"Bleeding Heart" (Elmore James)	February 24, 1969, Royal Albert Hall	7:39
9.	"Hey Joe" (Billy Roberts)	May 30, 1970, Berkeley Community Theatre (2nd show)	4:50
10.	"Wild Thing" (Chip Taylor)	October 12, 1968, Winterland Arena (1st show)	3:31
11.	"Hear My Train A Comin'"	October 10, 1968, Winterland Arena (2nd show)	8:27
12.	"Foxey Lady" (CD bonus track)	April 26, 1969, The Forum	4:46
Total length:			01:12:57

== Personnel ==
- Jimi Hendrix – guitar, vocals
- Mitch Mitchell – drums
- Noel Redding – bass guitar (all tracks except "Red House" & "Hey Joe")
- Billy Cox – bass guitar ("Red House" & "Hey Joe")
