= Cornerstones: 1967–1970 =

Cornerstones 1967–1970

Greatest hits album by Jimi Hendrix
- Released: 1990
- Recorded: October 23, 1966 – August 1970
- Genre: Rock
- Length: 71:26
- Label: Polydor
- Producer: Various

Jimi Hendrix chronology
Radio One (1988)	Cornerstones 1967–1970 (1990)	Stages (1991)

Singles from Cornerstones: 1967-1970
- 1. "Crosstown Traffic/Voodoo Child (Slight Return)" Released: 1990

Professional ratings
Review scores
Source	Rating
AllMusic	3/5 stars
Select	1/5 medals

Cornerstones 1967–1970 is a 1990 compilation album by American guitarist Jimi Hendrix. It features 18 of his greatest hits, including live renditions of "Fire" and "Stone Free" from the Atlanta International Pop Festival, Byron, Georgia, July 4, 1970. It was released on the Polydor label in the United Kingdom and other parts of Europe. The album entered the UK Albums Chart in November 1990 at No. 5, its highest position during a sixteen-week stay in the chart. All songs were recorded between October 23, 1966, and August 1970. This was the only compact disc release at the time to have the studio version of "The Star Spangled Banner" (that appeared on the Rainbow Bridge LP).

== Track listing ==
All songs were written by Jimi Hendrix, except where noted.

1. "Hey Joe" (Billy Roberts)
2. "Purple Haze"
3. "The Wind Cries Mary"
4. "Foxy Lady"
5. "Crosstown Traffic"
6. "All Along the Watchtower" (Bob Dylan)
7. "Voodoo Child (Slight Return)"
8. "Have You Ever Been (To Electric Ladyland)"
9. "Star Spangled Banner" (John Stafford Smith, arr. Hendrix) (Studio version)
10. "Stepping Stone"
11. "Room Full of Mirrors"
12. "Ezy Ryder"
13. "Freedom"
14. "Drifting"
15. "In from the Storm"
16. "Angel"
17. "Fire" (Live at the Atlanta International Pop Festival, Byron, Georgia, July 4, 1970)
18. "Stone Free" (Live at the Atlanta International Pop Festival, Byron, Georgia, July 4, 1970)

The Last two tracks are not included on the vinyl release.

== Personnel ==
- Jimi Hendrix – electric guitar, lead vocals, bass (on track 6, 8), background vocals, comb and paper (track 5)
- Noel Redding – bass, backing vocals
- Mitch Mitchell – drums
- Billy Cox – bass on tracks 10–18, background vocals on track 12
- Buddy Miles – drums on tracks 10, 11 and 12, background vocals on track 12

== Certifications ==
Region	Certification	Certified units/sales
Australia (ARIA)	Gold	35,000^{^}
^{^} Shipments figures based on certification alone.
