= Valleys of Neptune (song) =

Single by Jimi Hendrix

from the album Valleys of Neptune
- B-side: "Cat Talking to Me" (7-inch single); "Peace in Mississippi" & "Red House" (Walmart exclusive CD single)
- Released: February 9, 2010
- Recorded: September 23, 1969; May 15, 1970
- Studio: Record Plant, New York City
- Genre: Rock
- Length: 4:02
- Label: Legacy
- Songwriter(s): Jimi Hendrix
- Producer(s): Jimi Hendrix

Jimi Hendrix singles chronology
| "The Star-Spangled Banner" (1999) | "Valleys of Neptune" (2010) | "Bleeding Heart" (2010) |

"Valleys of Neptune" is a song by American rock musician Jimi Hendrix, featured on his 2010 posthumous studio album Valleys of Neptune. Written and produced by Hendrix, the song was originally recorded between 1969 and 1970.

== Composition and recording ==
Hendrix began work on the musical composition for "Valleys of Neptune", under the title of "Gypsy Blood", in February 1969, with the first recordings taking place at Olympic Sound Studios in London on February 22 & 26, 1969 – three takes on guitar and piano and one take on guitar, respectively. Hendrix wrote the lyrics for the song under the title of "Valleys of Neptune... Arising" on June 7, 1969, inspired by the writings of 'the sleeping prophet' Edgar Cayce regarding the rediscovery of mythical Isle of Atlantis, while staying at the Beverly Rodeo Hotel in Beverly Hills, California. Bassist Noel Redding left the Jimi Hendrix Experience following a show on June 29, 1969, in Denver, Colorado, and afterwards "Valleys of Neptune" began to take more shape.

At the Hit Factory in New York City on September 6, 1969, Hendrix recorded the song with a full band. A few weeks later, on September 23, 1969, the first master recording of "Valleys of Neptune" was recorded at New York City's Record Plant Studios with bassist Billy Cox, drummer Mitch Mitchell and percussionist Juma Sultan, in addition to seven instrumental takes of the track. Another full take was completed a week later, featuring Hendrix on bass with Stephen Stills on guitar and piano, John Sebastian on guitar and Buddy Miles on drums.

Hendrix with bassist Cox and drummer Buddy Miles, who had recorded the Band of Gypsys album, recorded rough takes of the song on January 21, 1970, at the Record Plant, but ultimately the song was left to the Mitchell/Cox rhythm section to complete later in the year. An instrumental take on May 15, 1970, provided the musical master track, and the track featured on the 2010 album was completed. Further recordings took place on June 15, 1970 (with keyboardist Steve Winwood, flute player Chris Wood, drummer Dave Palmer and an unknown bassist), June 16, June 25 (with Juma Sultan), and June 26, 1970 (15 takes). Hendrix died in September 1970, ultimately without completing "Valleys of Neptune" to his satisfaction.

== Music video ==
The music video for "Valleys of Neptune", produced by String Theory Design, is centered around a 1957 painting by Hendrix used as the cover for the single. The video debuted on AOL's Spinner.com on February 18, 2010.

== Single tracks ==
- 7-inch vinyl:
  - A-side: "Valleys of Neptune"
  - B-side: "Cat Talking to Me"
- CD single (Sold exclusively at Walmart)
  - 1."Valleys of Neptune"
  - 2."Peace in Mississippi"
  - 3."Red House" (Live at Clark University March 15, 1968)

== Charts ==
| Chart (2010) | Peak position |
|---|---|
| Japan (Japan Hot 100) | 48 |
| US Heritage Rock (Billboard) | 15 |
