= Are You Experienced? (song) =

1967 song by the Jimi Hendrix Experience

Song by the Jimi Hendrix Experience

from the album Are You Experienced
- Released: May 12, 1967 (UK); August 23, 1967 (US)
- Recorded: April 3, 1967
- Studio: Olympic Sound, London
- Genre: Psychedelic rock
- Length: 4:02
- Label: Track (UK); Reprise (US)
- Songwriter: Jimi Hendrix
- Producer: Chas Chandler

"Are You Experienced?" is the title track from the Jimi Hendrix Experience's 1967 debut studio album. It has been described as one of Jimi Hendrix's most original compositions on the album by music writer and biographer Keith Shadwick. The song is largely based on one chord and has a drone-like quality reminiscent of Indian classical music. It features recorded guitar and drum parts that are played backwards and a repeating piano octave. Live recordings from 1968 are included on The Jimi Hendrix Concerts album and Winterland box set.

== Recording and production ==
"Are You Experienced?" was recorded at London's Olympic Sound Studios on April 3, 1967, the final day of recording for Are You Experienced (along with the lead vocal for "Fire", overdubs for "Love or Confusion", and the master recordings of "Highway Chile" and "May This Be Love"). The backwards guitar track was recorded four times, with the last take being used for the final version. According to engineering assistant George Chkiantz, "The original idea [for the guitar recording] was to do a loop, but that gave a problem ... we tried looping it and then we couldn't get it to loop ... in the end Jimi got so impatient doing this, he said 'look, it's quite easy, we're just gonna play' and played it in". It is also possible that Hendrix performed some of the backwards drum parts on the song in addition to drummer Mitch Mitchell.

Biographer Keith Shadwick notes the song's droning quality, which he compares to Indian classical music. Although he believes the song does not include a bass guitar line (further underscoring the Indian approach), bassist Noel Redding is listed on some albums. An earlier instrumental take of the song recorded the same day included Redding's bass pushed more forward in the mix.

== Composition and lyrics ==
Hendrix historians Harry Shapiro and Caesar Glebbeek have praised "Are You Experienced?" as "a majestic setpiece of declamatory anthem rock":

Mitch [Mitchell]'s military snare raps out behind the startlingly contemporary hip-hop scratch sound-effects of tapes running backwards punctuating Jimi's condition for being your guide ('If you can get your mind together'). To what? Sexual ecstasy? Altered states of consciousness? Or just finding yourself, taking time out to view what you're doing from the outside, 'from the bottom of the sea', letting go of the daily grind of the 'measly world'. It is all there for the taking. The secret is being at peace with yourself – 'not necessarily stoned, but beautiful'.

== Live performances ==
Despite its studio complexity, "Are You Experienced?" was performed live by Experience several times in 1967 and 1968. It was used as the closing number at a Saville Theatre show in London on June 4, 1967. According to a review by Disc and Music Echo, the rendition of the Are You Experienced was "smashing [and] ear splitting". Hendrix "ended the gig by smashing a guitar handed to him for the finale ... and hurling it into the audience". The show was dubbed a "farewell" concert by Shapiro and Glebbeek, before the band headed to the US and their appearance at the Monterey Pop Festival.

A performance recorded at the Winterland Ballroom in San Francisco, California, on October 10, 1968, was released on the 1982 The Jimi Hendrix Concerts album. A second performance on October 11 was included on a bonus disc for Live at Winterland, with Virgil Gonzales' flute part edited out. In 2011, the song was included on the Winterland box set.

Liam Gallagher performed the song live twice in August 2023, first at Koko Club, London and secondly in Tokyo, Japan as part of his C'mon You Know Tour. The song was the final of the encore.

== Releases and other renditions ==
The original song is included on the 2001 posthumous compilation album Voodoo Child: The Jimi Hendrix Collection, while a previously unreleased take is featured on the 2010 box set West Coast Seattle Boy: The Jimi Hendrix Anthology.

A music video of "Are You Experienced?" aired on MTV in conjunction with the release of Kiss the Sky.

== Devo version ==
"Are You Experienced?"

Single by Devo

from the album Shout
- B-side: "Growing Pains" (7-inch single); "Please Please" (12-inch single)
- Released: November 14, 1984
- Genre: New wave; art pop
- Length: 3:08
- Label: Warner Bros.
- Songwriter: Jimi Hendrix
- Producer: Devo

Devo singles chronology
| "Theme from Doctor Detroit" (1983) | "Are You Experienced?" (1984) | "Here to Go" (1985) |

American rock band Devo recorded "Are You Experienced?" for their sixth studio album, Shout. It was released as the album's lead single (stylized as "Are U X-perienced?" on the picture sleeve) and includes the non-album track, "Growing Pains", as its B-side (which was also released as a bonus track on CD release of the album). Their adaptation carried on the Devo tradition of radically transforming notable songs, which began with their 1978 cover of the Rolling Stones song "(I Can't Get No) Satisfaction."

=== Promotional music video ===
A lavish video for "Are You Experienced?" was produced by the band in conjunction with Ivan Stang of the Church of the SubGenius. The video includes Devo as floating blobs of wax in a lava lamp and Jimi Hendrix (played by Hendrix impersonator Randy Hansen) stepping out of his coffin to play a guitar solo, and the cover children Zachary Chase and Alex Mothersbaugh.

Despite being one of Devo's most visually complex and expensive music videos, costing about $90,000 to produce, it was not included on the 2003 DVD music video collection The Complete Truth About De-Evolution (although it had been included on the LaserDisc of the same name issued in 1993). In an interview, group co-founder and bass guitarist Gerald Casale explained:

- E.C. (earcandy.com): Speaking of de-evolution, why didn't the Hendrix estate give you permission to put the "Are You Experienced?" video on the DVD?
- Gerald Casale: Further de-evolution. You understand that the consortium of people that now represent the Hendrix estate are basically run by lawyers; the lawyer mentality. Lawyers always posit the worst-case scenarios. Though that video was loved for years by anybody who saw it including the man who commissioned it—Chuck Arroff, a luminary in the music business, who still claims to this day that it was one of his five most favorite videos ever—they [the lawyers] didn't get it and assumed we were making fun of Jimi. That's like saying "Whip It" makes fun of cowboys. This is so stupid it's unbelievable.
