= Third Stone from the Sun =

1967 song by the Jimi Hendrix Experience

Song by the Jimi Hendrix Experience

from the album Are You Experienced
- Released: May 12, 1967 (UK); August 23, 1967 (US)
- Recorded: London, January & April 1967
- Genre: Psychedelic rock; jazz rock; space rock
- Length: 6:30
- Label: Track (UK); Reprise (US)
- Songwriter: Jimi Hendrix
- Producer: Chas Chandler

"Third Stone from the Sun" (or "3rd Stone from the Sun") is a mostly instrumental composition by American musician Jimi Hendrix. It incorporates several musical approaches, including jazz and psychedelic rock, with brief spoken passages. The title reflects Hendrix's interest in science fiction and is a reference to Earth in its position as the third planet away from the Sun in the Solar System.

Hendrix developed elements of the piece prior to forming his group, the Jimi Hendrix Experience. The Experience recorded versions as early as December 1966, and, in 1967, it was included on their debut album Are You Experienced. Several artists have recorded renditions and others have adapted the guitar melody line for other songs.

== Background ==
In the summer of 1966, Hendrix relocated to New York City's Greenwich Village. There he explored a rock sound outside of the musical confines of the Harlem rhythm and blues scene. While performing with his group Jimmy James and the Blue Flames at the Cafe Wha?, Hendrix played elements or early versions of "Third Stone from the Sun". He continued to develop it after moving to England with new manager Chas Chandler. The two shared an interest in science fiction writing, including that of American author Philip José Farmer. (Note: Hendrix and Chandler read Farmer's Night of Light, which referenced a "purplish haze".) Chandler recalled:

I had dozens of science fiction books at home ... The first one Jimi read was Earth Abides. It wasn't a Flash Gordon type, it's an end-of-the-world, new beginning, disaster-type story. He started reading through them all. That where 'Third Stone from the Sun' and 'Up from the Skies' came from.

Music journalist Charles Shaar Murray associates it with the "hazy cosmic jive straight out of the Sun Ra science fiction textbook." Hendrix chronicler Harry Shapiro suggests that his reference of a hen may have been inspired by "Ain't Nobody Here but Us Chickens", a jump blues song by Louis Jordan. Jordan's song was one of the biggest hits of 1946 and was popular with rhythm and blues bands in Seattle, where Hendrix grew up and first performed.

== Composition ==
Hendrix biographer Keith Shadwick describes "Third Stone from the Sun" as "a structured group performance" composed of several identifiable passages or sections with further subdivisions.The first section opens with guitar chording, which Murray notes as "sliding major ninth ... arpeggiated chords and Coltranoid mock-orientalisms" with Mitch Mitchell's Elvin Jones-influenced drumming. After several bars of the intro, Hendrix moves to a Wes Montgomery-style octave guitar melody line. It is one of Hendrix's most recognizable guitar figures and is notated in common or 4/4 time in the key of E mixolydian:

Several writers have noted the jazz influences in the first section. However, Shadwick points out that "at no point does the band sound merely like a group of musicians imitating other styles. They have their own musical identity." Midway, Hendrix adds a bluesy guitar improvisation part with Mitchell and Redding switching to a more standard rock rhythm backing, before returning to the guitar melody.

Around 2:30, Hendrix abruptly changes direction with a vibrato arm swoop, which sets the stage for the second section and his feedback-laden guitar improvisations. Music critic Richie Unterberger described it as an "instrumental freak-out jam" and "a tour de force of psychedelic guitar". Redding anchors the section with a three-note bass ostinato while Mitchell provides rhythmic improvisation. Shadwick describes Hendrix's solo:

[T]his is not an orthodox guitar solo. It is more akin to a soundscape forged from his control of amplified feedback and the way he manipulates the Stratocaster's [guitar's] physical characteristics, including its switches and vibrato arm.

Murray notes that he performs largely independent of rhythm, tonality, or notes and enters into pure sound, which he describes as:

[S]creams, whinnies, sirens, revving motorcycle engines, burglar alarms, explosions, droning buzz-saws, subway trains, the rattling of disintegrating industrial machinery, the howl and the whine of mortar shells.

To wind down, Hendrix returns to the guitar melody line, although with more distortion and vibrato. The instrumental concludes with "what was possibly the Experience's version of Armageddon" and a fade.

== Spoken sections ==
Third Stone from the Sun
30 seconds with Hendrix's "majestic and superior cackling hen"

Spoken sections, often slowed down and otherwise sonically manipulated, run intermittently throughout the piece. Hendrix and Chandler recorded the dialogue, which parodies a science fiction scenario. Shadwick notes the joking nature, although Hendrix described it matter-of-factly:

These guys come from another planet, you know ... they observe Earth for a while and they think the smartest animal on the whole Earth is chickens [and] there's nothing else there, so they just blow it up at the end.

The dialogue opens with a mock communication between alien space explorers slowed to half-speed, which makes it mostly unintelligible.

Hendrix: Star fleet to scout ship, please give your position. Over.

Chandler: I am in orbit around the third planet of star called the Sun. Over.

Hendrix: You mean it's the Earth? Over.

Chandler: Positive. It is known to have some form of intelligent species. Over.

Hendrix: I think we should take a look.

The alien visitor, voiced by Hendrix at normal speed, makes some observations of the planet. He marvels at the "majestic and superior cackling hen", but dismisses the people and concludes:

So to you I shall put an end
And you'll never hear surf music again ...
[At half-speed] That sounds like a lie to me
Come on man, let's go home

Music journalist Peter Doggett notes the irony of the surf music reference. In 1970, business manager Michael Jeffery committed Hendrix to contributing to the soundtrack for Rainbow Bridge; his music is heard during surfing scenes with David Nuuhiwa and others. (Note: In an opening scene in Rainbow Bridge, an unidentified character on horseback shoots a surfer riding his board, while Hendrix's performance of "Ezy Ryder" plays over the sequence.) Pioneer surf guitarist Dick Dale, who claimed to have met Hendrix in Los Angeles in 1964, believed the mention was Hendrix's way of encouraging his recuperation when Dale was seriously ill.

== Recording ==
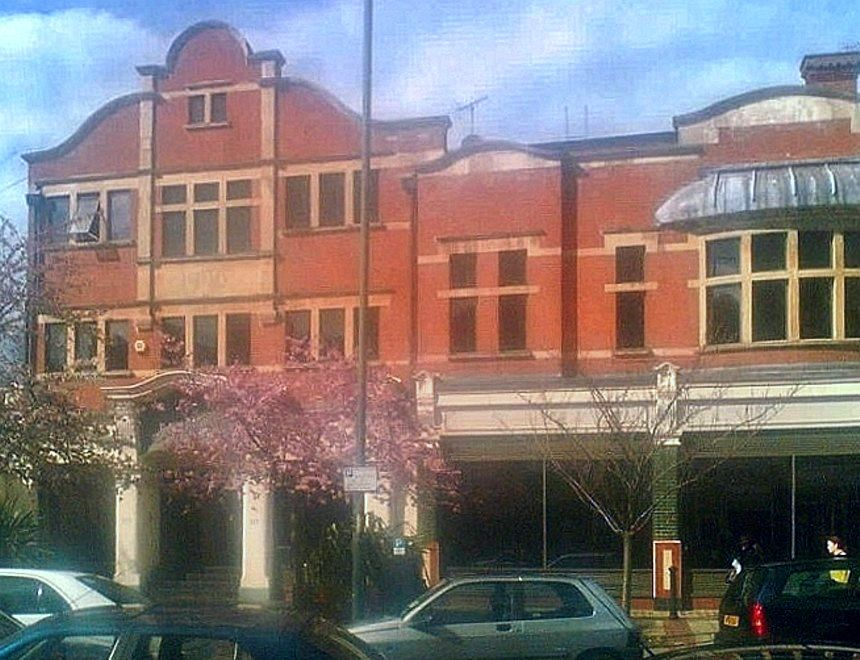
Olympic Studios, Barnes, London, 2008.

"Third Stone from the Sun" was one of the earliest recordings attempted by the Experience. They recorded a demo version at CBS studios in London on December 13, 1966. However, because of a dispute over studio fees, it was left unfinished. On January 11, 1967, several takes were recorded at De Lane Lea Studios in London, but a master was not realized. Work on the track resumed on April 4, 1967, at Olympic Studios in London. Session engineer Eddie Kramer recalls that the original recording was largely abandoned and replaced with new overdubs.

The master for the track was finally completed on April 10, 1967, also at Olympic. At this session, the spoken sections and sound effects were recorded and the final audio mixing took place. Several takes were required since Hendrix and Chandler were joking and laughing throughout the session. Hendrix biographer and later producer John McDermott notes that it shows the camaraderie enjoyed by the two during the early days of the Experience.

The instrumental makes novel use of recording and mixing. Hendrix contributed to the sound effects by moving his headphones around the microphone to alter the sound of his whispers and breathing. In preparing the final mix, Kramer experimented with the track's sound imaging or an instrument's apparent placement, but was limited by the existing technology. He later explained:

That song was like a watercolor painting ... to create a sense of movement within the overall sound, I pushed Mitch's [drummer Mitch Mitchell's] cymbals forward in the mix and panned the four tracks on the finished master. Each track was composed of four, fairly dense, composite images. With four track recording, you were restricted to panning these multiple layers of sound, whereas now, with twenty-four and forty-eight track recording, what you can pan is unlimited.

== Releases and performances ==
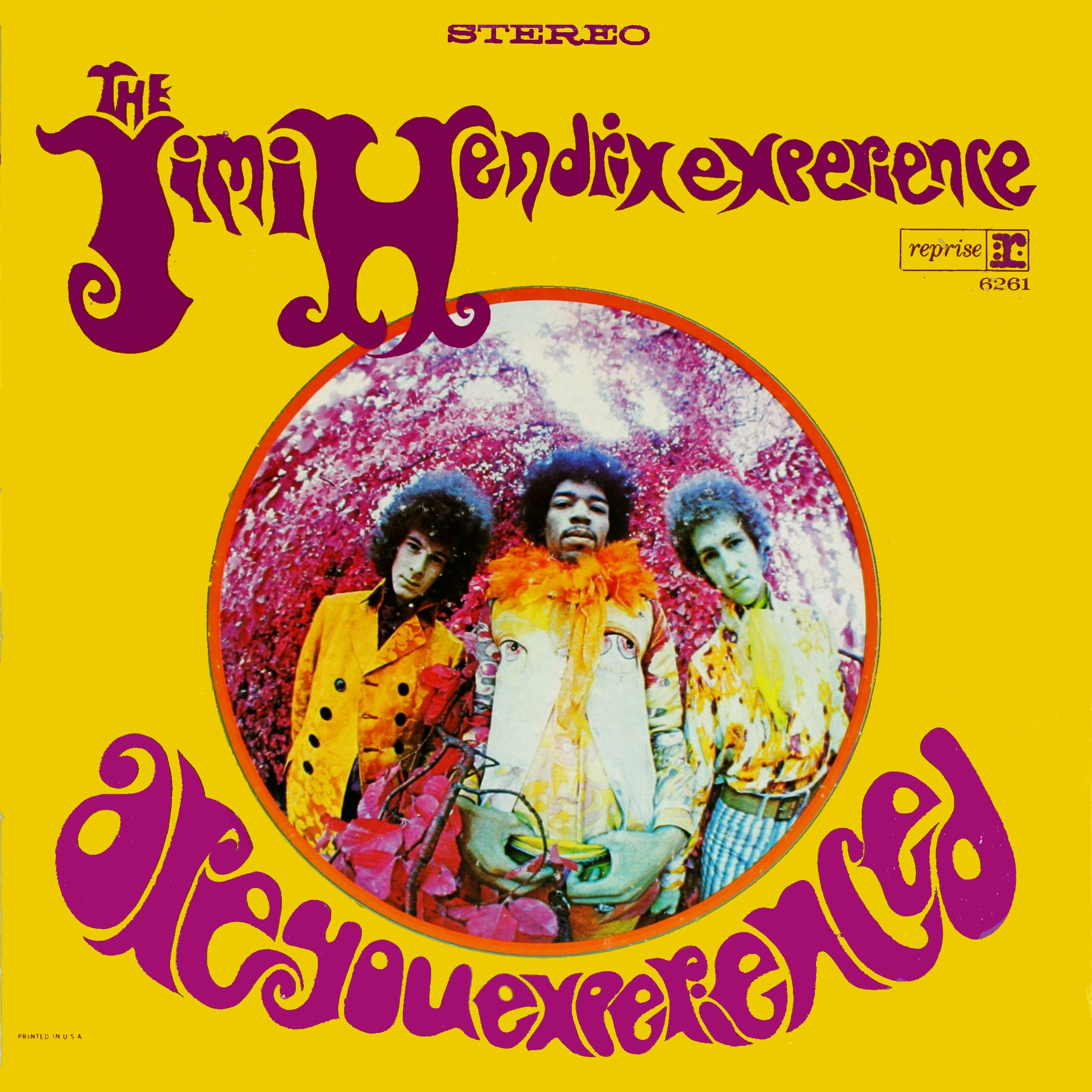
Are You Experienced, US Reprise album cover, 1967

"Third Stone from the Sun" was released on the Experience's debut album, Are You Experienced. It appears as the third track on side two of the LP record. Track Records issued the album in the UK on May 12, 1967, using "3rd Stone from the Sun" as the title. It also used a monaural mix, which includes an extra line, "War must be war". Reprise Records issued the album in the US on August 23, 1967, with a stereo mix.

In 1982, the instrumental was included on the UK Voodoo Chile 12-inch single and the following The Singles Album (1983). It also appeared on compilations, such as Re-Experienced (1975), The Essential Jimi Hendrix (1978), Kiss the Sky (1984), and Voodoo Child: The Jimi Hendrix Collection (2001 UK bonus track). In 2000, a version with some different overdubbed dialogue (and without sound processing) was released on The Jimi Hendrix Experience boxed set.

Mitchell recalled that the instrumental was only played live occasionally. A performance at Blaise's club in London shortly after the December 1966 release of "Hey Joe" was reviewed by music journalist Chris Welch for Melody Maker. It was the only original piece among several songs he mentioned in the article. Hendrix played some of the guitar melody line during "Spanish Castle Magic" at the Maple Leaf Gardens in Toronto, Canada, shortly after his arrest for drug possession on May 3, 1969. Hendrix biographer Steven Roby identifies a 1969 concert recording, possibly from Germany in January, as the only recorded complete performance of "Third Stone from the Sun". None of the live recordings have been officially released.

== Reception and influence ==
Music writers have described the instrumental's jazz elements and Murray questions whether Hendrix's approach was studied or more organic. (Note: "Up from the Skies", from Axis: Bold as Love, also mixes sci-fi and jazz, perhaps more consciously in the style of Mose Allison and Grant Green.) Bassist Jaco Pastorius felt that Hendrix's impact on jazz was obvious: "All I got to say is ... 'Third Stone from the Sun'. And for anyone who doesn't know about that by now [1982], they should have checked Jimi out a lot earlier."

According to music educator William Echard, "Third Stone from the Sun" "closely resemble[s] later space-rock norms and was likely influential in putting these into place". Shadwick feels that the freak-out sections may have inspired countless less-imaginative imitators. In a song review for AllMusic, Unterberger saw the potential for a more fully realized piece:

"Third Stone from the Sun" suffers from too much electronic trickery, too much convoluted ambition in its freaky turns and twists, and not enough follow-through from the quite good guitar riffs that surface from time to time.

Musicians from a variety of backgrounds have recorded versions of the instrumental. A live recording by guitarist Stevie Ray Vaughan appears on Live at the El Mocambo (1991 video). Music critic Bret Adams wrote in an album review for AllMusic, "Vaughan pays tribute to Hendrix again with 'Third Stone from the Sun'; he thrashes on his famously mangled sunburst Stratocaster and coaxes unholy noises out of it. It's as if Pete Townshend took possession of him in that moment." The more complete version is included on Power of Soul: A Tribute to Jimi Hendrix (2004). AllMusic's Sean Westergaard calls it "a blistering live medley of 'Little Wing' and 'Third Stone from the Sun' ... Vaughan absolutely nails it. There are some flubs in his performance, but the amount of feeling he plays with easily overcomes them".

The guitar melody has been quoted in a number of different recorded songs, such as "Baby, Please Don't Go" (the Amboy Dukes, 1968), "Dance with the Devil" (Cozy Powell, 1973), and "I'm Too Sexy" (Right Said Fred, 1991). In 1995 museum designer Neal Potter used a version of the Third Stone from the Sun within London's Natural History Museum. Visitors heard the music as they travelled on an escalator through the centre of a large creation of the Earth set within the stars and planets.Copyright was granted for 10 years after which the music was changed.

== Sources ==
- Belmo; Loveless, Steve (1998). Jimi Hendrix: Experience the Music. Burlington, Ontario: Collector's Guide Publishing. ISBN 1-896522-45-9.
- Black, Johnny (1999). Jimi Hendrix: The Ultimate Experience. New York City: Thunder's Mouth Press. ISBN 1-56025-240-5.
- Doggett, Peter (2011). Jimi Hendrix: The Complete Guide To His Music. London: Omnibus Press. ISBN 978-0-85712-710-5.
- Echard, William (2017). Psychedelic Popular Music: A History through Musical Topic Theory. Bloomington, Indiana: Indiana University Press. p. 5. ISBN 978-0253026590.
- Hendrix, Janie (2003). Jimi Hendrix: The Lyrics. Milwaukee, Wisconsin: Hal Leonard. ISBN 0-634-04930-5.
- Jucha, Gary J. (2013). Jimi Hendrix FAQ: All That's Left to Know About the Voodoo Child. Milwaukee, Wisconsin: Backbeat Books. ISBN 978-1-61713-095-3.
- McDermott, John (2000). The Jimi Hendrix Experience (Box set booklet). Jimi Hendrix Experience. New York City: MCA Records. 08811 23162.
- McDermott, John; Kramer, Eddie; Cox, Billy (2009). Ultimate Hendrix. New York City: Backbeat Books. ISBN 978-0-87930-938-1.
- Milkowski, Bill (2005). Jaco: The Extraordinary and Tragic Life of Jaco Pastorius. San Francisco: Backbeat Books. ISBN 978-0-87930-859-9.
- Mitchell, Mitch; Platt, John (1990). Jimi Hendrix: Inside the Experience. New York City: St. Martin's Press. ISBN 978-0-312-10098-8.
- Murray, Charles Shaar (1991). Crosstown Traffic. New York City: St. Martin's Press. ISBN 0-312-06324-5.
- Roby, Steven (2002). Black Gold: The Lost Archives of Jimi Hendrix. New York City: Billboard Books. ISBN 0-8230-7854-X.
- Roby, Steven; Schreiber, Brad (2010). Becoming Jimi Hendrix. Cambridge, Massachusetts: Da Capo Press. ISBN 978-0-306-81910-0.
- Shadwick, Keith (2003). Jimi Hendrix: Musician. San Francisco: Backbeat Books. ISBN 0-87930-764-1.
- Shapiro, Harry; Glebbeek, Cesar (1991). Jimi Hendrix: Electric Gypsy. New York City: St. Martin's Press. ISBN 0-312-05861-6.
- Spicer, Al (1999). Rock: 100 Essential CDs – The Rough Guide. London: Rough Guides. ISBN 978-1858284903.
