= Purple Haze =

1967 single by the Jimi Hendrix Experience

- West German single picture sleeve

Single by the Jimi Hendrix Experience
- B-side: "51st Anniversary" (UK); "The Wind Cries Mary" (US)
- Released: March 17, 1967 (UK) (Note: There are conflicting dates given for the Track single release of "Purple Haze". Shapiro, Roby, and the Jimi Hendrix Encyclopedia list the date as March 17, 1967; McDermott uses March 1, 1967.); June 19, 1967 (US)
- Recorded: January 11, 1967; February 3–8, 1967
- Studio: De Lane Lea, London; Olympic, London
- Genre: Psychedelic rock; hard rock; proto-metal
- Length: 2:46
- Label: Track (UK); Reprise (US)
- Songwriter: Jimi Hendrix
- Producer: Chas Chandler

Experience UK singles chronology
"Hey Joe" (1966)	"Purple Haze" (1967)	"The Wind Cries Mary" (1967)

Experience US singles chronology
"Hey Joe" (1967)	"Purple Haze" (1967)	"Foxey Lady" (1967)

"Purple Haze" is a song written by Jimi Hendrix and released as the second single by the Jimi Hendrix Experience on March 17, 1967, in the United Kingdom. The song features his inventive guitar playing, which uses the signature Hendrix chord and a mix of blues and Eastern modalities, shaped by novel sound processing techniques. Because of ambiguities in the lyrics, listeners often interpret the song as referring to a psychedelic experience, although Hendrix described it as a love song. It was included as the opening track in the North American edition of the Experience's debut album, Are You Experienced (1967).

"Purple Haze" is one of Hendrix's best-known songs and appears on many Hendrix compilation albums. The song featured regularly in concerts and each of Hendrix's group configurations issued live recordings. It was inducted into the Grammy Hall of Fame and is included on lists of the greatest guitar songs, including at number two by Rolling Stone and number one by Q magazine. In 2004 and 2010, the former ranked it at number 17 on its “The 500 Greatest Songs of All Time” list, re-ranking it to number 250 in the 2021 edition.

== Background and recording ==
By January 5, 1967, the Jimi Hendrix Experience's first single, "Hey Joe", backed with "Stone Free", had peaked at number six on the UK record chart. "Hey Joe" was not a Hendrix composition – it was written by Billy Roberts and recorded by several groups prior to the Experience. Hendrix commented, "That record isn't us. The next one's gonna be different. We're working on an LP which will mainly be our stuff." The group recorded several demos of original material at studios in London, including "Can You See Me", "Foxy Lady", "Third Stone from the Sun", "Red House", and "Remember". In the middle of December, producer Chas Chandler heard Hendrix toying around with a new guitar riff. "I heard him playing it at the flat and was knocked out. I told him to keep working on that, saying, 'That's the next single!'" Chandler claimed that after some more urging, Hendrix wrote the rest of "Purple Haze" in the dressing room of a London club during the afternoon of December 26, 1966, before a gig. In several interviews, Hendrix spoke about writing the song, but did not mention where or when he wrote it.

The Experience began recording "Purple Haze" on January 11, 1967, at De Lane Lea Studios in London. According to drummer Mitch Mitchell, he and bassist Noel Redding learned the song in the studio: "Hendrix came in and kind of hummed us the riff and showed Noel the chords and the changes. I listened to it and we went, 'OK, let's do it.' We got it on the third take as I recall." The basic track was recorded in four hours, according to Chandler. Multitrack recording technology allowed engineers to record and complete additional parts on the final master. After the basic track was finished, Chandler explained that he and Hendrix developed the song:

With 'Purple Haze', Hendrix and I were striving for a sound and just kept going back in [to the studio], two hours at a time, trying to achieve it. It wasn't like we were there for days on end. We recorded it, and then Hendrix and I would be sitting at home saying, 'Let's try that.' Then we would go in for an hour or two. That's how it was in those days. However long it took to record one specific idea, that's how long we would book. We kept going in and out.

Redding and Mitchell were not included in the process because Chandler felt that it was more efficient for him and Hendrix to do it alone. To get a better quality recording, Chandler took the four-track tape recorded at De Lane Lea to Olympic Studios for overdubbing (although Hendrix had worked with eight-track recording in the US, it was not yet available in the UK). At Olympic, they were assigned Eddie Kramer, who, as a sound engineer, played an important role in subsequent Hendrix recordings. Hendrix added new vocals and guitar parts between February 3 and 8, 1967. Unlike the conventional techniques used by the Experience to record previous songs, Chandler decided to try out new effects and sounds for "Purple Haze". He enhanced background sounds (some contributed by Redding) by playing them back through headphones, which were moved around the recording microphone, creating "a weird echo". Chandler also used sped-up guitar parts recorded at half-speed (which also raises the pitch) and panning to create novel effects. The guitar solo features the first use of the Octavia guitar effects unit. Acoustical and electronics engineer Roger Mayer developed the unit with input from Hendrix. The Octavia doubles the frequency of the sound it is fed, essentially adding an upper octave.

== Lyrics and interpretation ==
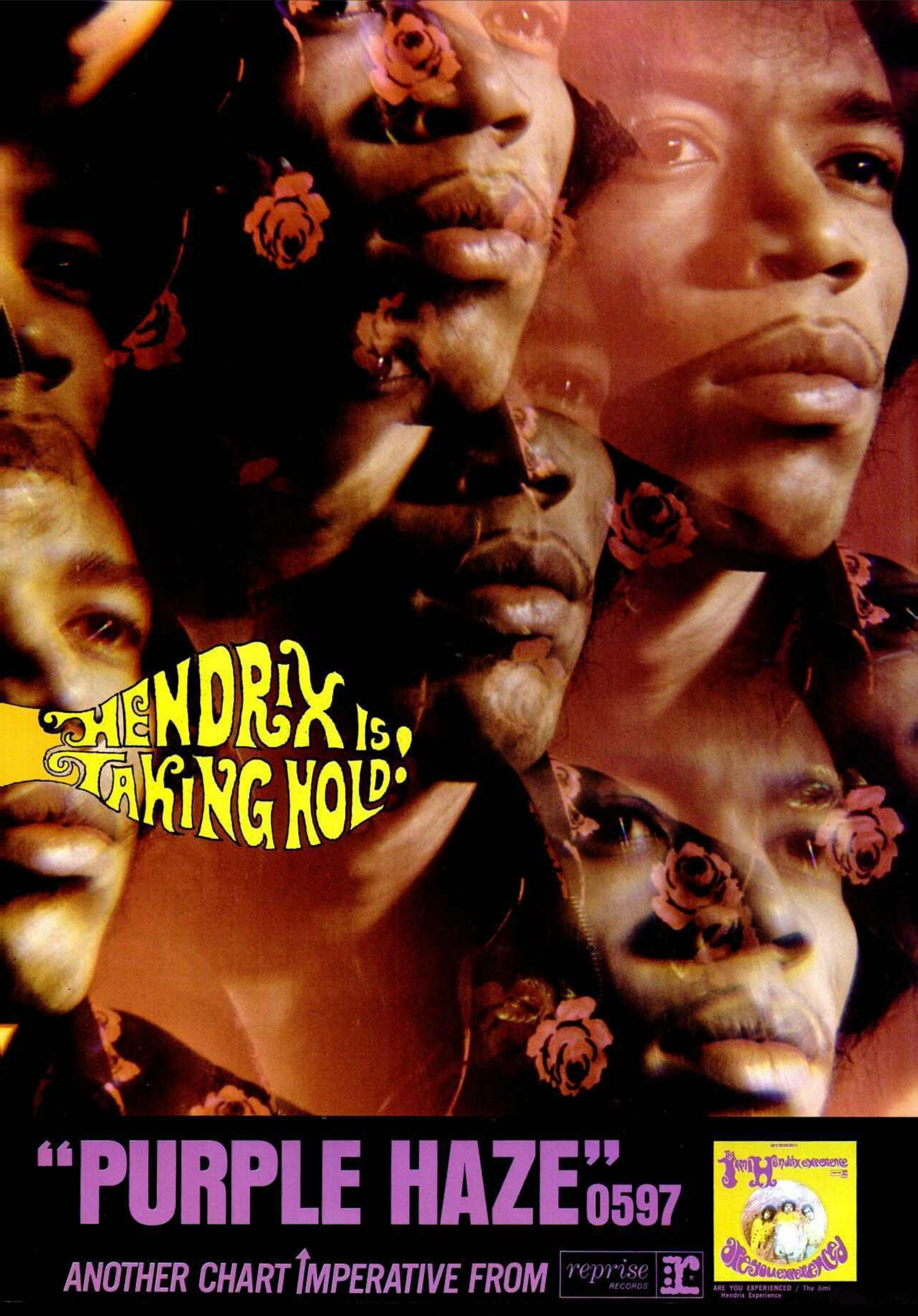
Billboard advertisement, September 9, 1967

In interviews, Hendrix usually gave different answers about the development of the song's lyrics. Biographer Harry Shapiro points out that "Purple Haze" is most likely "a pot-pourri of ideas" which Hendrix developed over time. As a fan of science fiction, he frequently incorporated its imagery in his songwriting. Hendrix read Night of Light, a 1966 novel by Philip José Farmer, that expanded on a short story published in 1957. In the story set on a distant planet, sunspots produce a "purplish haze" which has a disorienting effect on the inhabitants. The phrase “purple haze” also appears in Ayn Rand’s 1943 novel The Fountainhead (Part 2, Chapter 14), and even earlier in Charles Dickens’ 1861 novel Great Expectations (Chapter 54), although it is unknown whether Hendrix had read these and was influenced by them. (Note: The phrase "purple haze" appears in literature, including in Charles Dickens' 1861 novel Great Expectations: "There was the red sun, on the low level of the shore, in a purple haze, fast deepening into black" (Chapter 54).) An early handwritten draft of the song by Hendrix, titled "Purple Haze – Jesus Saves", uses dream-like imagery where the sense of direction and time is distorted. In an interview on January 28, 1967, before the song was completed, Hendrix was asked how he wrote songs; he responded, "I dream a lot and I put my dreams down as songs. I wrote one called 'First Look Around the Corner' and another called 'The Purple Haze,' which was about a dream I had that I was walking under the sea." (Note: The Hendrix song "Are You Experienced?", recorded in April 1967 and included as the title track for the Experience's debut album, includes a reference to walking under the sea: "We'll hold hands and then we'll watch the sunrise, from the bottom of the sea".) He later expressed frustration that he was unable to more fully develop his ideas for the song:

You know the song we had named 'Purple Haze'? [It] had about a thousand, thousand words ... I had it all written out. It was about going through, through this land. This mythical ... because that's what I like to do is write a lot of mythical scenes. You know, like the history of the wars on Neptune.

So far, only a crumpled single sheet of ruled yellow tablet paper is on exhibit at the Rock and Roll Hall of Fame and does not include any of the lyrics used in the Experience song. Chandler admitted that in the early stages, he helped Hendrix shape the songs and lyrics to radio single length. Biographer Keith Shadwick comments that although much of the complexity may have been sacrificed, it resulted in verses that are "simple, focused and striking".

After its release, Hendrix offered another explanation: "He [the song's protagonist] likes this girl so much, that he doesn't know what [state] he's in, ya know. A sort of daze, I suppose. That's what the song is all about." This draws on an experience Hendrix had while still in New York, where he felt that a girl was attempting to use voodoo to trap him and he became ill. Shapiro believes that this is reflected in most of the first two verses:

Purple haze all around, don't know if I'm coming up or down
Am I happy or in misery, whatever it is that girl put a spell on me

Many fans and the press interpret the song as referring to a psychedelic experience due to lines such as "purple haze all in my brain" and "'scuse me while I kiss the sky". However, Hendrix and those closest to him never discussed any connection between psychedelic drugs and the song, although Shapiro admits that, at the time, to do so would have been "professional suicide". Chandler, who claimed he was present when Hendrix wrote it, later denied suggestions that Hendrix did so while under the influence of psychedelics. Commenting on the lyrics, Shadwick concludes "the music [was allowed] to tell the larger story. Poised effectively between the twin intoxicants of drugs and desire, they could be interpreted to the listener's taste". (Note: Three months after the UK single release, the Experience performed at the Monterey Pop Festival on June 18, 1967. Underground chemist Owsley Stanley had made a special batch of LSD for the festival, which he dubbed "Monterey Purple". Although some connected it to "Purple Haze", Stanley disliked the association, feeling that it was "far from inducing haze, [rather it] would confer upon the user preternatural clarity.") In concert, Hendrix sometimes substituted lyrics for comic effect; "'scuse me while I kiss the sky" was rendered "'scuse me while I kiss this guy" (while gesturing towards Mitchell), "'scuse me while I kiss that policeman" (at a near riot in Los Angeles), or "'scuse me while I fuck the sky" (during a downpour in Seattle).

== Composition ==
Purple Haze
17 seconds of intro

Music critic William Ruhlmann describes "Purple Haze" as having "relentlessly driving, if relatively slow-paced underlying music, which provides a good platform for some of Hendrix's inventive guitar playing". Beginning with its dissonant opening and heavy use of distortion, Hendrix's techniques "all contributed to the dirty, raw, metallic, [and] angular sounds" heard in the song, according to Shapiro. The intro consists of the melodic interval of a tritone or diminished (sometimes called flattened) fifth. Historically, this dissonant interval has been referred to as diabolus in musica (literally "Devil in music"). It is sounded during the first two measures by Hendrix playing a B♭ on guitar against an E played by Redding on bass, followed by the respective octaves. Mitchell on drums comes in for the third measure, when Hendrix introduces the riff that piqued Chandler's interest, and Redding continues playing the octaves in E.

After the riff, the verse sections begin, which Shadwick describe as "simplicity itself, consisting of just three chords": E7♯9, G, and A. The E7♯9, or dominant seventh sharp ninth chord, has come to be called the "Hendrix chord" by guitarists and was used primarily in rhythm and blues and jazz before Hendrix helped popularize it. He also used an unconventional fingering technique for the G and A chords. Because Hendrix used his thumb to fret the roots of the G and A chords on the sixth string, his fingers were left in a position to create different chord voicings. Instead of the usual G barre chord (G–D–G–B–D–G), a G5 (G–X–G–G–D–G) is sometimes played with the major third (B) being muted on the fifth string and replaced by the open third string (G). Redding follows the chord changes mostly by playing the root with occasional passing notes, while Mitchell heightens the tension with drum flourishes that accentuate Hendrix's vocal and guitar.

Em Casalena of American Songwriter wrote, "for lack of a better descriptor, [the song sounds] alien. Or at least, it was alien when it was released back in 1967." Biographer David Henderson describes Hendrix's guitar tone on the track as "at the razor edge of distort". However, individual notes are still clear, as well as the harmonically more complex chords, even with the use of extreme overdrive for the time. The tension is maintained until the guitar solo, which "arrives as something of a release rather than a further racking up of the atmosphere." It is also when Hendrix first introduces the Octavia, coupled with a Fuzz Face distortion unit. Whitehill describes the solo as "almost sound[ing] likes he's playing a blues raga. He starts out playing in the Mixolydian mode and then he goes right into the blues side. The Octavia has the effect of a sitar, kind of like Ravi Shankar meets B.B. King." During the song's outro, the guitar part recorded at 7½ inches per second (ips) played back at 15 ips, is combined with the Octavia, further extending the guitar's upper frequency range. Henderson describes it as "an uncanny piercing tone that takes off, Eastern-sounding beyond the range of the guitar" and, according to Shadwick, "gives the impression that the guitar notes are flying off into the ether."

== Releases and charts ==
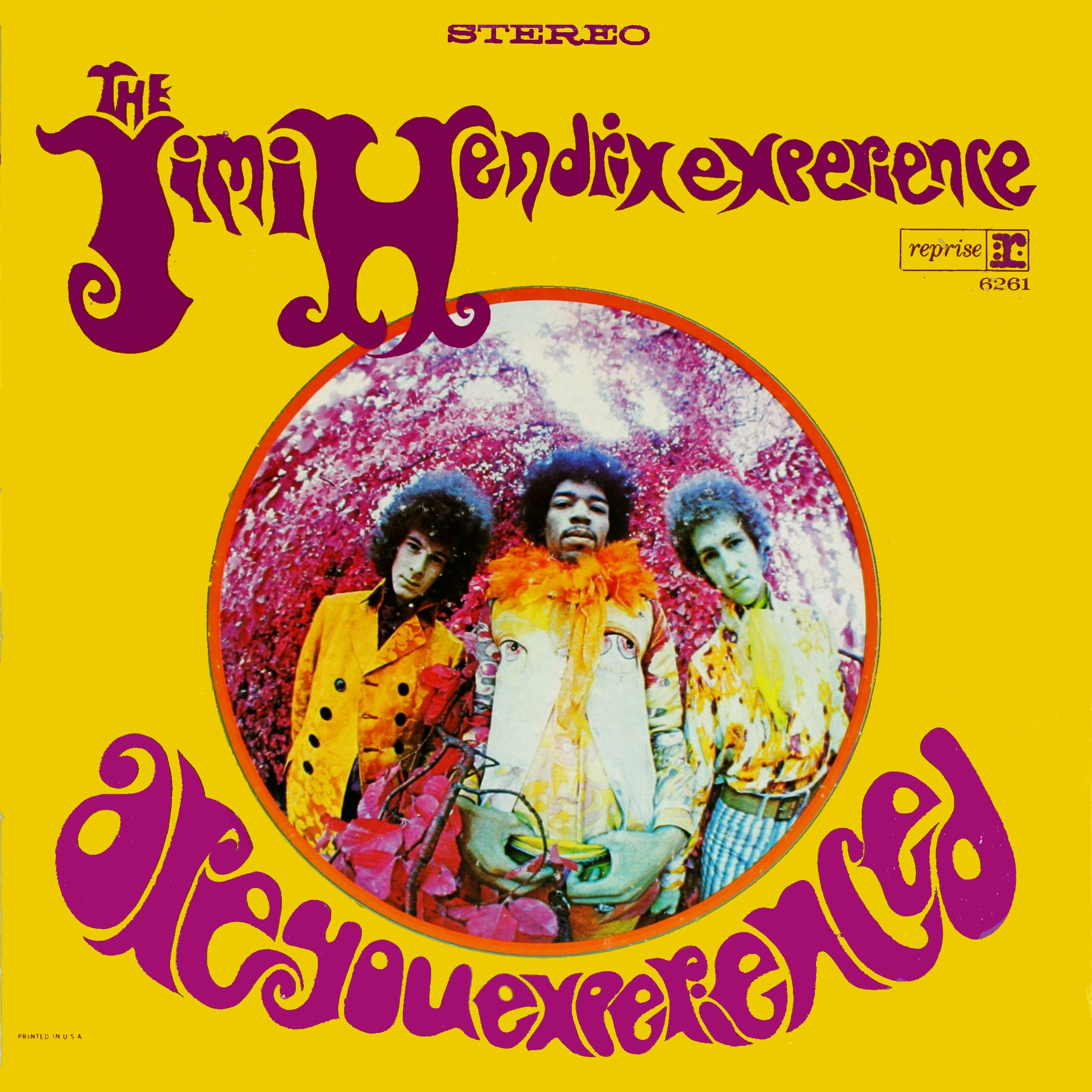
"Purple Haze" became the opening track on the 1967 American Are You Experienced album

1967 singles charts
Chart	Peak	Ref(s)
Austria (Ö3 Austria Top 40)	7	
Belgium (Ultratop 50 Wallonia)	45	
Netherlands (Singles chart)	11	
New Zealand (Listener)	9	
Norway (VG-lista)	7	
UK (Record Retailer)	3	
US Billboard Hot 100	65	
West Germany (GfK)	17	

On March 17, 1967, "Purple Haze" was released in the UK as the first single on Track Records. Another Hendrix composition, the R&B-influenced "51st Anniversary" was included as the B-side. Paul McCartney, who was an early Hendrix supporter, gave the record an enthusiastic pre-release review in Melody Maker. The single entered the charts at number 39 on Record Mirror and at number 43 on Melody Maker. It peaked at number three and spent 14 weeks on the chart. During March 1967, several performances of "Purple Haze" were filmed to promote the song and used for television programs, such as Beat-Club, Dee Time, and Top of the Pops. Live performances were also broadcast on German NDR and BBC Radio's Saturday Club. In 2022, the British Phonographic Industry awarded "Purple Haze" its Gold certification, signifying sales of over 400,000.

For the American single, Reprise Records paired the song with "The Wind Cries Mary". (Note: Track Records marked on the box with master tape sent to Reprise Records for its remastering, "DELIBERATE DISTORTION. DO NOT CORRECT.") It was released on June 19, 1967, the day following the Experience's performance at the Monterey Pop Festival. (Note: There are also conflicting dates for the Reprise single release. Shapiro, Roby, and Shadwick list it as June 19, 1967; McDermott uses August 16, 1967, one week before the American release of Are You Experienced.) The single entered the Billboard Hot 100 pop chart on August 26, where it spent eight weeks and reached number 65. "Purple Haze" was included as the opening track on the American release of Are You Experienced on August 23, 1967. Because of the song's airplay on underground FM radio, the album became more popular than Hendrix's singles. (Note: KMPX in San Francisco, one of the pioneers of the "underground" or progressive radio formats in the US, began playing an acetate pressing of the song before it was released by Track Records in the UK.)

One of Hendrix's most popular songs, "Purple Haze" appears on numerous compilation albums. Some of these include Smash Hits, The Essential Jimi Hendrix, The Singles Album, Kiss the Sky, Cornerstones: 1967–1970, The Ultimate Experience, Experience Hendrix: The Best of Jimi Hendrix, Voodoo Child: The Jimi Hendrix Collection, and The Singles Collection. An alternative version recorded at the same time, but with different vocal and guitar overdubs, is the first song on The Jimi Hendrix Experience 2000 box set. Live recordings of "Purple Haze" as performed by different Hendrix lineups have been released. These include Live at Monterey (the Experience), Live at Woodstock (Gypsy Sun and Rainbows), and Live at Berkeley (the Cry of Love touring group). Additional live recordings with the Experience appear on Winterland (2011 Billboard number 49 album) and Miami Pop Festival (2013 Billboard number 39 album).

== Recognition and influence ==
In March 2005, Q magazine ranked "Purple Haze" at number one in its list of the "100 Greatest Guitar Tracks Ever!" The song placed at number two on Rolling Stone magazine's "100 Greatest Guitar Songs of All Time" list, which noted that the song "unveiled a new guitar language charged with spiritual hunger and the poetry possible in electricity and studio technology". It also appeared at number 17 on the magazine's "500 Greatest Songs of All Time" list in 2004, with the comment that "it launched not one but two revolutions: late-Sixties psychedelia and the unprecedented genius of Jimi Hendrix". It was re-ranked to number 250 on the 2021 edition of the list. Author and music critic Dave Marsh called it the "debut single of the Album Rock Era". In 1995, "Purple Haze" was included as one of the Rock and Roll Hall of Fame's "500 Songs That Shaped Rock and Roll". NPR named the song to its list of the "100 Most Important American Musical Works of the 20th Century" in 2000. In 2000, it was given a Grammy Hall of Fame Award, which "honor[s] recordings of lasting qualitative or historical significance". In 2020, Far Out ranked the song number one on their list of the 20 greatest Jimi Hendrix songs, and in 2021, American Songwriter ranked the song number two on their list of the 10 greatest Jimi Hendrix songs.

Many musicians have recorded their interpretations of the song, making it one of Hendrix's most covered songs. Dion DiMucci included an acoustic version with strings on his 1968 comeback album Dion. Released as a single in 1969, it appeared at number 63 on the Billboard Hot 100, which was two positions higher than Hendrix' single in 1967. In Canada, where Hendrix's single did not reach the charts, Dion's version reached number 72. Also with a new arrangement, the Cure recorded it for the various artist's Stone Free: A Tribute to Jimi Hendrix in 1993. Their rendition reached number two on Billboard's Modern Rock Tracks alternative rock chart. "Purple Haze" has achieved an unusual level of interest among classical musicians. The Meridian Arts Ensemble, the Hampton String Quartet, and Nigel Kennedy have recorded their interpretations and the Kronos Quartet often play it as an encore.

== Certifications ==
Region	Certification	Certified units/sales
Japan	—	100,000
United Kingdom (BPI)	Gold	400,000^{‡}
^{‡} Sales+streaming figures based on certification alone.

== See also ==
- Album era

== Notes ==
Footnotes

== Sources ==
- Belmo; Loveless, Steve (1998). Jimi Hendrix: Experience the Music. Burlington, Ontario, Canada: Collector's Guide Publishing. ISBN 1-896522-45-9.
- Cross, Charles R. (2005). Room Full of Mirrors: A Biography of Jimi Hendrix (1st. Trade Paperback ed.). New York City: Hyperion Books. ISBN 0-7868-8841-5.
- Experience Hendrix (2012). "Jimi Hendrix Encyclopedia". JimiHendrix.com (official website).
- Hal Leonard (1998). Experience Hendrix: The Best of Jimi Hendrix Transcribed Scores. Milwaukee, Wisconsin: Hal Leonard. ISBN 978-0-7935-9144-2.
- Henderson, David (1981). 'Scuse Me While I Kiss the Sky: The Life of Jimi Hendrix (Bantam 10/1981 ed.). Bantam Books. ISBN 0-553-01334-3.
- Hendrix, Janie (2003). Jimi Hendrix: The Lyrics. Milwaukee, Wisconsin: Hal Leonard. ISBN 0-634-04930-5.
- Marsh, David (1997). Are You Experienced (CD reissue notes). The Jimi Hendrix Experience. Universal City, California: MCA Records. MCAD-11602.
- Marsh, David (1999). The Heart of Rock & Soul: The 1001 Greatest Singles Ever Made (1st. Da Capo Press ed.). New York City: Da Capo Press. ISBN 978-0306809019.
- McDermott, John; Kramer, Eddie (1992). Hendrix: Setting the Record Straight. New York City: Warner Books. ISBN 0-446-39431-9.
- McDermott, John; Cox, Billy; Kramer, Eddie (1995). Jimi Hendrix: Sessions (1st. ed.). Boston, Massachusetts: Little, Brown. ISBN 0-316-55549-5.
- McDermott, John; Kramer, Eddie; Cox, Billy (2009). Ultimate Hendrix. New York City: Backbeat Books. ISBN 978-0-87930-938-1.
- Roby, Steven (2002). Black Gold: The Lost Archives of Jimi Hendrix. New York City: Billboard Books. ISBN 0-8230-7854-X.
- Roby, Steven; Schreiber, Brad (2010). Becoming Jimi Hendrix (1st. Da Capo Press ed.). Cambridge, Massachusetts: Da Capo Press. ISBN 978-0-306-81910-0.
- Roby, Steven (2012). Hendrix on Hendrix: Interviews and Encounters with Jimi Hendrix. Chicago Review Press. ISBN 978-1-61374-322-5.
- Shadwick, Keith (2003). Jimi Hendrix: Musician (1st. ed.). San Francisco, California: Backbeat Books. ISBN 0-87930-764-1.
- Shapiro, Harry; Glebbeek, Cesar (1990). Jimi Hendrix: Electric Gypsy. New York City: St. Martin's Press. ISBN 0-312-05861-6.
- Tawa, Nicholas E. (2005). Supremely American: Popular Song in the 20th Century: Styles and Singers. Scarecrow Press. ISBN 978-0810852952.
- Walker, Michael (March 18, 2011). "Electric Kool-Aid Marketing Trip". New York Times. ISSN 1553-8095.
- Wheeler, Tom; Gore, Joe (1992). Fuzz, Feedback & Wah-Wah. Milwaukee, Wisconsin: Bella Godiva Music/Hal Leonard Publishing. ISBN 0-7935-1402-9.
- Whitburn, Joel (2008). Joel Whitburn Presents: Across The Charts The 1960s. Record Research. ISBN 978-0-89820-175-8.
- Whitehill, Dave; Rubin, Dave (1992). Octavia & Univibe. Milwaukee, Wisconsin: Bella Godiva Music/Hal Leonard Publishing. ISBN 0-7935-1403-7.
