= Squeeze Machine =

Studio album by Those Darn Accordions
- Released: September 18, 2007
- Recorded: 2007 at Laughing Tiger Studios, San Rafael, California
- Genre: Rock, pop, comedy, polka
- Length: 55:06
- Label: Globe Records
- Producer: Paul Rogers, Those Darn Accordions

Those Darn Accordions chronology
| Lawnball (2004) | Squeeze Machine (2007) |

Squeeze Machine is the sixth studio album by American accordion band Those Darn Accordions, released on September 18, 2007, by Globe Records.

== Overview ==
Continuing in the musical direction set by their 2001 EP Amped, Squeeze Machine is arguably TDA's most overtly rock and pop-oriented studio album, featuring a more pronounced use of acoustic guitar accompanying the band's trademark accordions. The album also features a polka by way of "Glass of Beer Polka", a duet with comedian Drew Carey, songs in funk, country and New Orleans styles, and even a piano ballad. Like all of TDA's albums, Squeeze Machine includes a few cover songs, here a version of AC/DC's "Back In Black" utilizing heavily distortion effects on the accordions, and a straightforward take on "It's Now Or Never", which originally appeared on TDA's first studio album, 1992's Vongole Fisarmonica.

Because of its low-key independent release, Squeeze Machine dropped under the radar of most major music publications, though internet reviewers were largely positive. Of the more notable reviews, Let's Polka, though mildly lamenting TDA's evolution from an accordion band to a rock band, summarized "Squeeze Machine does an excellent job showcasing TDA's strengths: catchy, offbeat, high-energy, accordion-driven tunes. It's tough to keep things fresh after 15 years, but Those Darn Accordions are clearly up to the challenge".

== Track listing ==
| No. | Title | Writer(s) | Length |
|---|---|---|---|
| 1. | "This Song" | P. Rogers | 3:14 |
| 2. | "Blame It On Those Darn Accordions" | P. Rogers | 4:20 |
| 3. | "Tandem Bike" | P. Rogers | 3:28 |
| 4. | "Glass Of Beer Polka" | P. Rogers | 3:00 |
| 5. | "Wrinkle Suit" | P. Rogers | 4:09 |
| 6. | "Vagabond Girl" | S. Davis | 4:16 |
| 7. | "Heads And Horns" | P. Rogers | 3:07 |
| 8. | "Cocktails In Tehran" | P. Rogers | 3:15 |
| 9. | "The Janitor Knows" | P. Rogers | 3:48 |
| 10. | "Back In Black" | A. Young/M. Young/B. Johnson | 4:00 |
| 11. | "Mr. Saggy Butt" | P. Rogers | 3:16 |
| 12. | "Stupid Things I Done" | P. Rogers | 2:48 |
| 13. | "Bob And The Office People" | P. Rogers | 3:30 |
| 14. | "It's Now Or Never" | W. Gold/A. Schroeder/E. di Capua | 3:33 |
| 15. | "Larry's Wonderful Life" | P. Rogers | 4:48 |
| Total length: | | | 55:06 |

== Personnel ==
Those Darn Accordions

- Paul Rogers - vocals, accordion, piano, ukulele
- Susie Davis - vocals, accordion, acoustic guitar, glockenspiel
- Carri Abrahms - vocals, accordion
- Suzanne Garramone - accordion
- Lewis Wallace - bass, vocals
- Michael Messer - drums, percussion

Additional musicians

- Drew Carey - vocals on "Glass Of Beer Polka"
- Evan Price - fiddle on "Heads And Horns"
- Chen Zhao - violin on "Cocktails In Tehran"
- Norton Buffalo - harmonica on "Heads And Horns"
- Austin deLone - electric guitar on "Blame It On Those Darn Accordions"
- Johny Blood - tuba on "Glass Of Beer Polka"
- Scoop McGuire - bass on "Vagabond Girl"
- Robert Powell - guitar and pedal steel on "Vagabond Girl"
- Bob Daspit - tambourine on "This Song"
- Lisa Redfern - hand claps on "Heads And Horns"
