= Bubblegum Alley =

Tourist attraction in San Luis Obispo, CA

Coordinates: 35.279026°N 120.66376°W

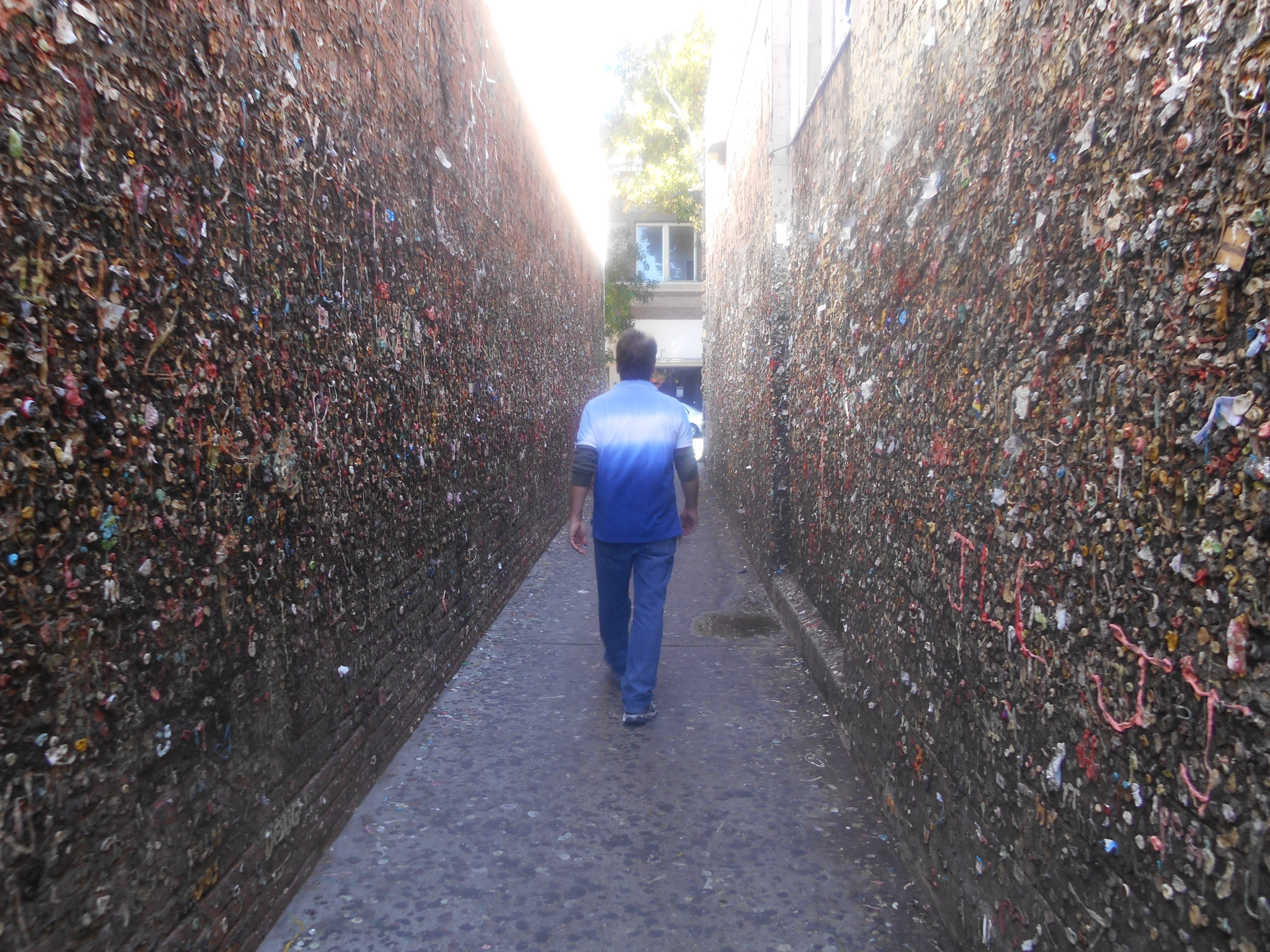
Bubblegum Alley in 2013

Bubblegum Alley is a tourist attraction in downtown San Luis Obispo, California, known for its accumulation of used bubble gum on the walls of an alley. It is a 15-foot (4.6 m) high and 70-foot (21 m) long alley lined with chewed gum left by passers-by. It covers a stretch of 66 feet (20 m) in the 700 block of Higuera Street in downtown San Luis Obispo.

== History ==
According to the San Luis Obispo Chamber of Commerce and Downtown Business Improvement Association, said it's "a little sketchy". Some historians believe that the tradition of the alley started after World War II as a San Luis Obispo High School graduating class event. Others believe it started in the late 1950s, as the rivalry between San Luis Obispo High School and California Polytechnic State University (Cal Poly) students. By the 1970s, Bubblegum Alley was well established. When shop owners complained that it was "unsanitary and disgusting", the alley underwent a full cleaning. The gum graffiti survived two full cleanings in the 1970s. In 1996, the Business Improvement Association unsuccessfully attempted to have another alley cleaning.

== Recognition ==
Throughout the years, San Luis Obispo's Bubblegum Alley has been featured on a number of television shows, news programs, and in newspapers around the world. Newspapers such as The New York Times and the Los Angeles Times have addressed the disgusts and delights of the gum wall visitors. Other newspaper articles have appeared in the San Francisco Chronicle, the Grand Rapids Press in Michigan, the Times Union from Albany, New York, and The Guardian in the United Kingdom. KSBY Action 6 News did a story about the alleyway. TV crews filmed the alley for The Tonight Show Starring Johnny Carson, That's Incredible!, Real People, and on "California's Gold" PBS. MTV featured Bubblegum Alley in the show Call to Greatness. The crew picked Bubblegum Alley to film the episode on breaking the world record for largest bubblegum bubble. It featured record holder Susan "Chewsy Suzy" Williams, and at the end of the show, a graphic was shown that said that while she was there she blew a 24-inch (610 mm) bubble, which was not shown on television. (Her record bubble, which was blown on national TV in 1996, was 23 inches.) ABC’s (American Broadcasting Company) Ripley's Believe It or Not! also aired a story on October 14, 1984 about the alley. It was also featured on an episode of The Girls Next Door on E! and mentioned in an episode of United States of Tara.

=== Books ===
In chapter seventeen of the novel Mr. Monk on the Road by Lee Goldberg, Bubblegum Alley is mentioned, described, and forms the setting for Monk's discovery of a dead body. Bubblegum Alley is also mentioned throughout Megan McDonald's book in the Judy Moody series, Judy Moody: Around the World in 8 and a Half Days. In 2021, Bubblegum Alley became the subject of a children's book, Stuck: A Bubblegum Alley Adventure.

=== Music ===
"Weird Al" Yankovic mentioned Bubblegum Alley in his 1978 song "Take Me Down," an ode to San Luis Obispo.

Those Darn Accordions recorded the song "Wall of Gum" on their 1999 album Clownhead about an unfortunate accident occurring in Bubblegum Alley.

== Controversy ==
Agreement on whether or not these gum-covered walls should remain a part of quaint downtown San Luis Obispo has not been reached since its founding. While the town historian and some local politicians consider this alley to be an "eyesore", the Chamber of Commerce lists it as a “special attraction”.

The Telegram Tribune reported that Bill Hales, a local pub owner, pays for the alley to be steam-cleaned once a month.

Store owners' complaints concerning upkeep are countered by the argument that it increases foot traffic and business. Deborah Holley, administrator of the Downtown Business Improvement Association, admits that despite the obvious problems it causes, it is nonetheless a landmark. The alley attracts tourists to the downtown, in such large numbers that there used to be a local radio station disc jockey that led people on bimonthly tours of the gum alley gallery.

== As art ==
=== Professional artists ===
The Alley has inspired professional artists such as Matthew Hoffman. On the east end of the alley up high on the north-facing wall, a giant self-portrait of Hoffman titled "Projectbubble Gum" is created entirely with bubble gum. The picture of the artist blowing a bubble required a tremendous amount of gum, which he was able to get with the help of the community. His theory is, "if an individual participates in their community they will earn an invested interest in their community. The community chewed the bubblegum, and many individuals [felt] as though they were a part of its creation. This instills a sense of stewardship in one’s community". Even the robotics Team 1717, featured in the book The New Cool, is depicted in neon blue gum.

=== Poets ===
One Arroyo Grande poet who wishes to be known as "M" wrote in defense of the Gum Alley. His poem was published in Don Pieper’s article in the Telegram-Tribune, 30, Apr 1986, "An Ode to Gum Alley".

== Images ==
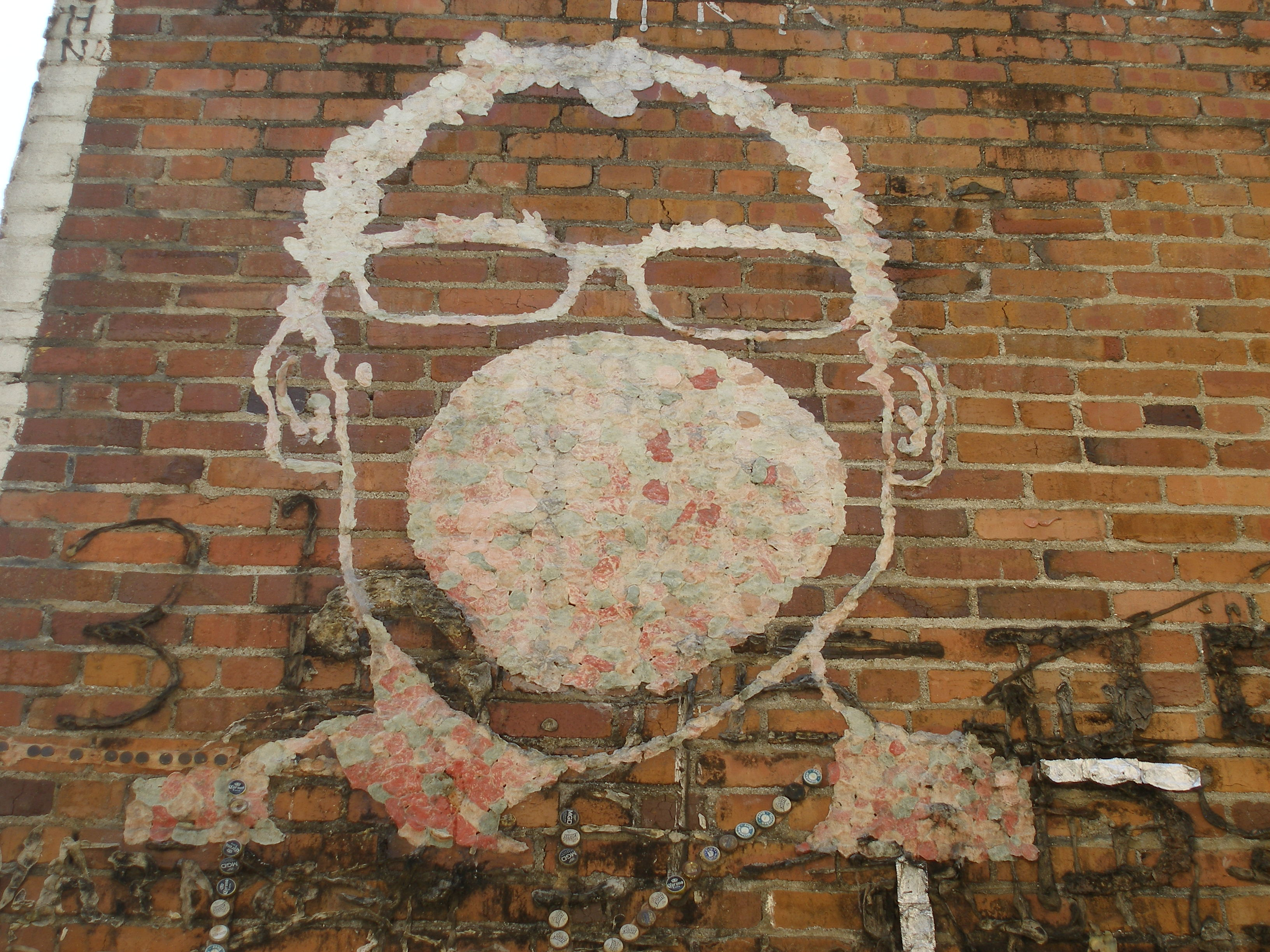

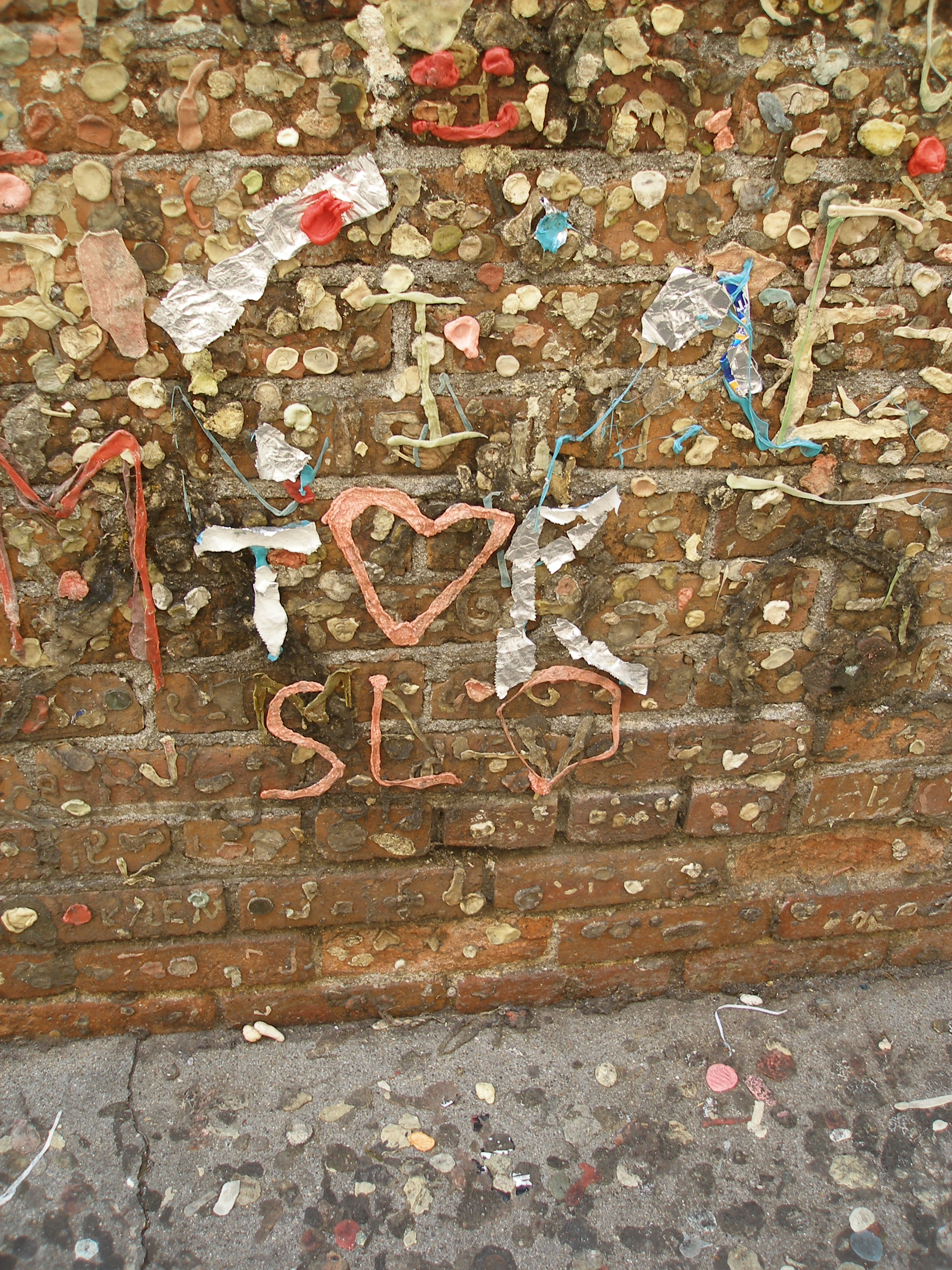

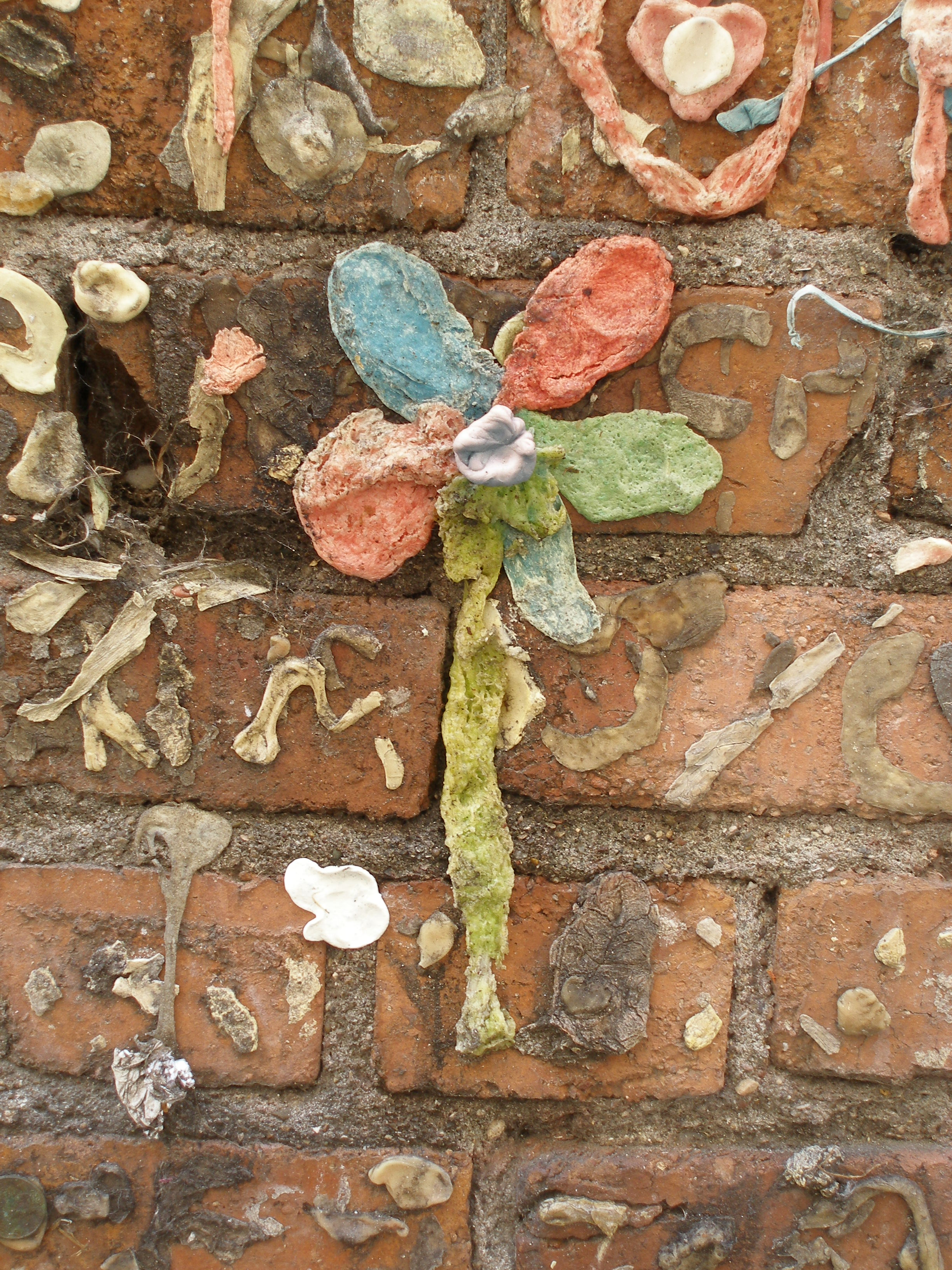

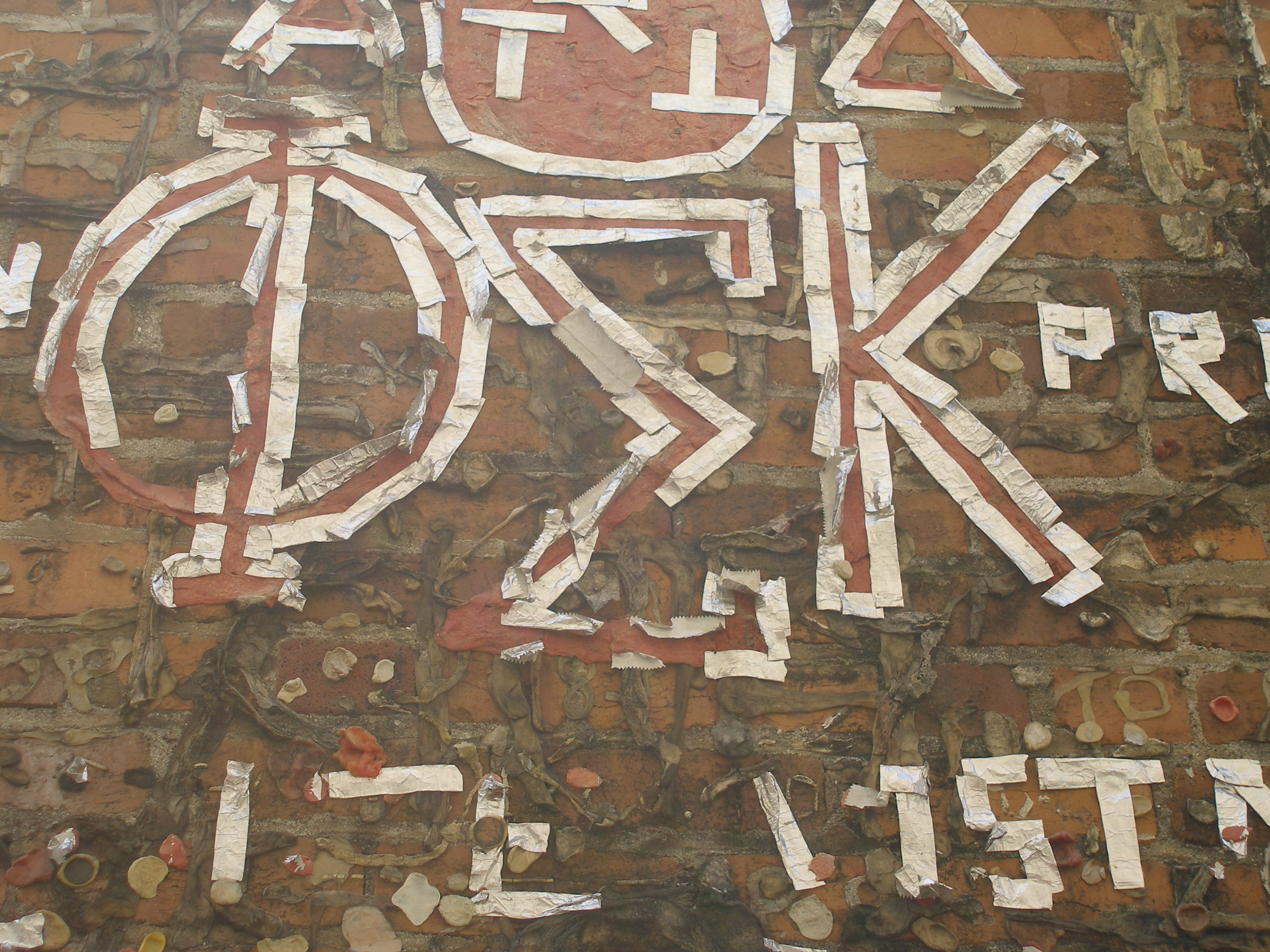

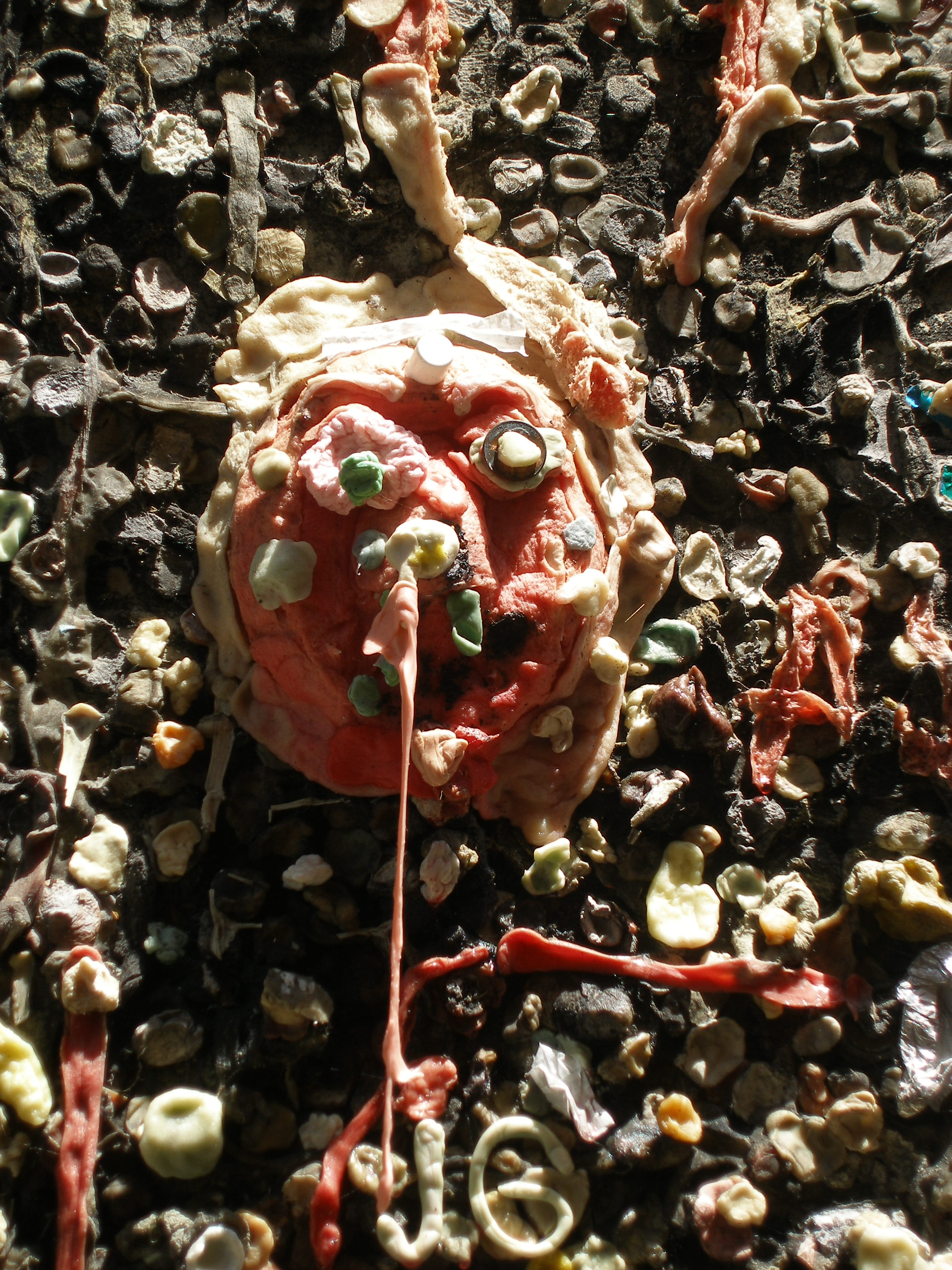

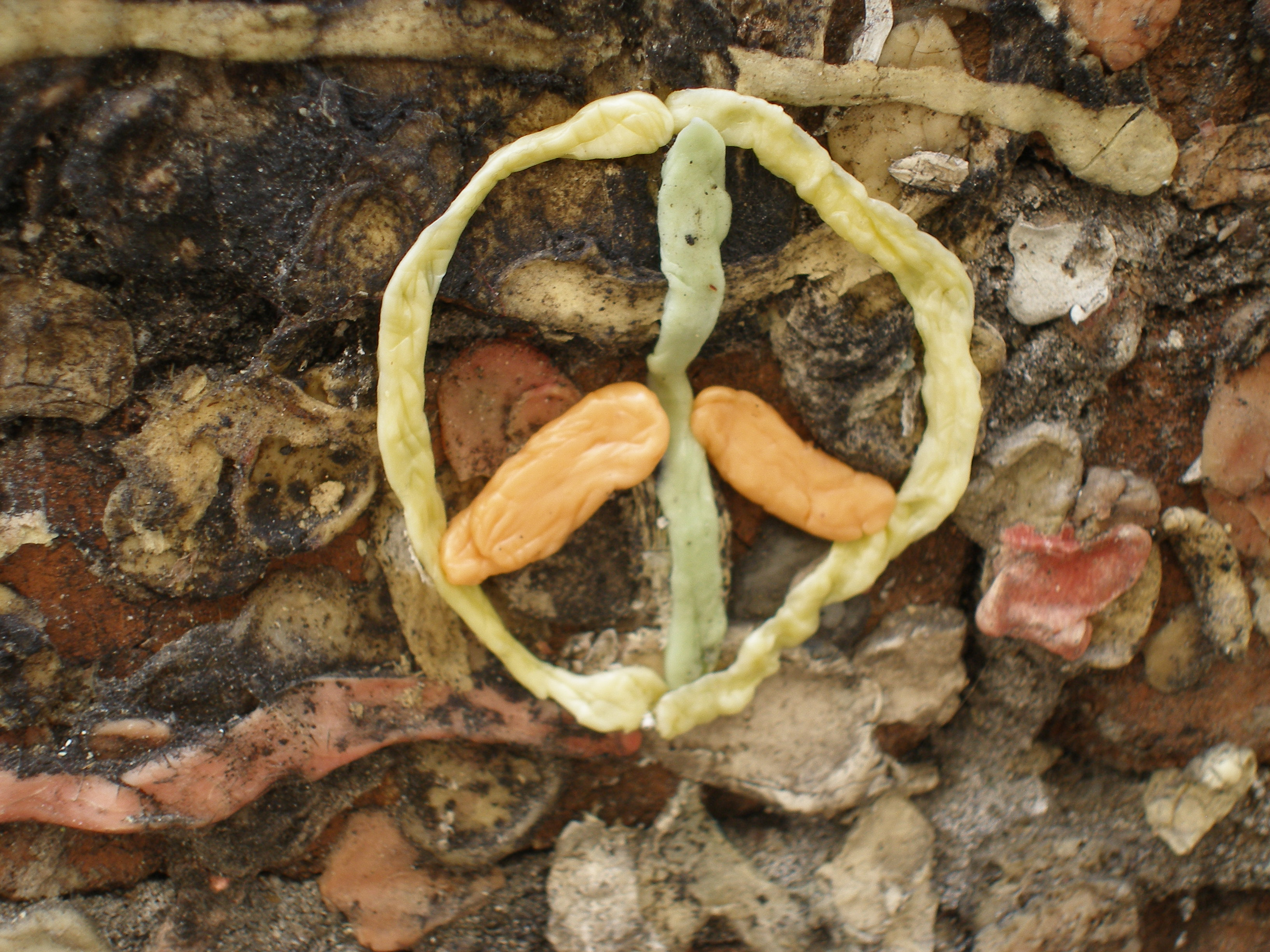

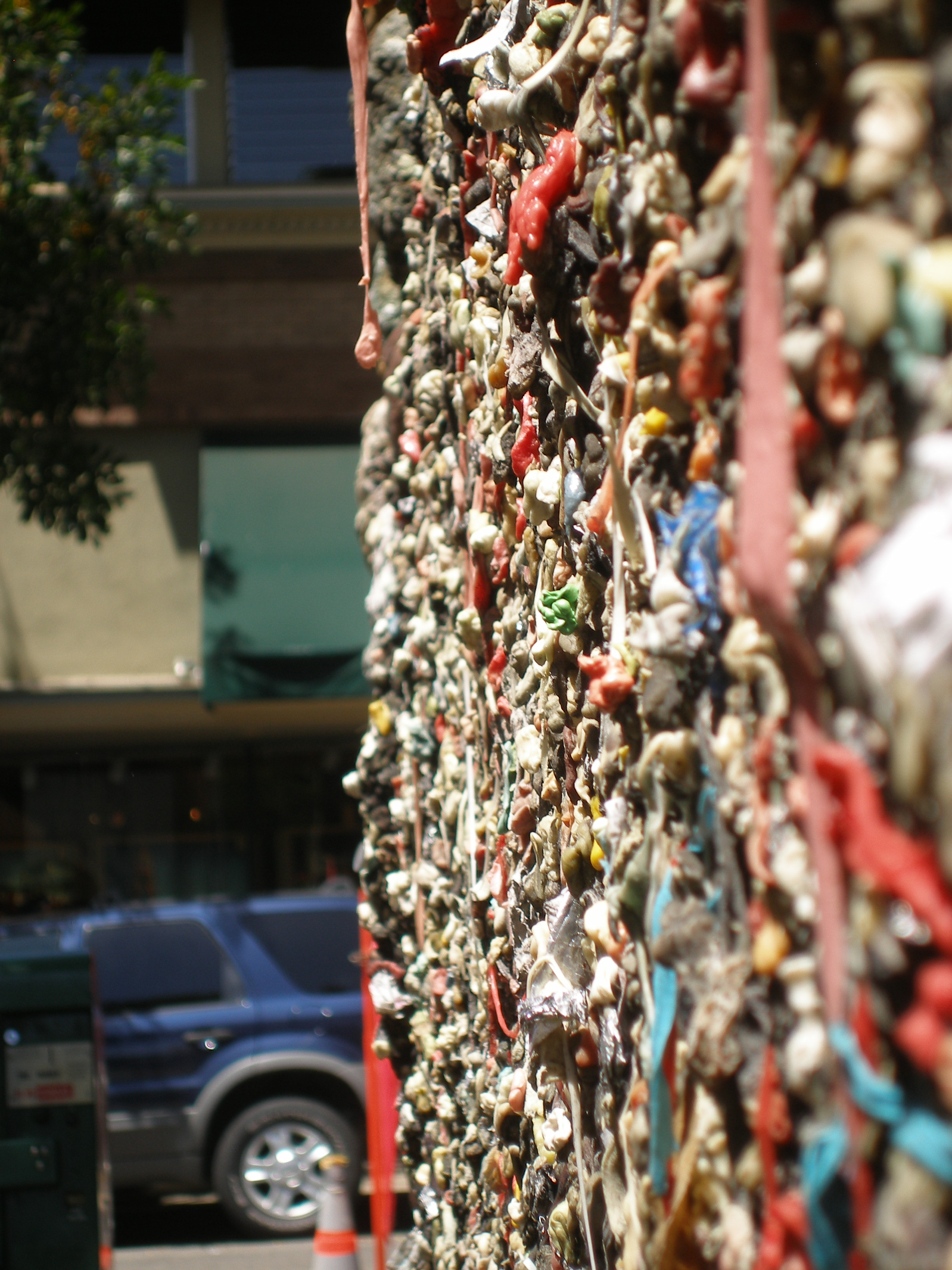

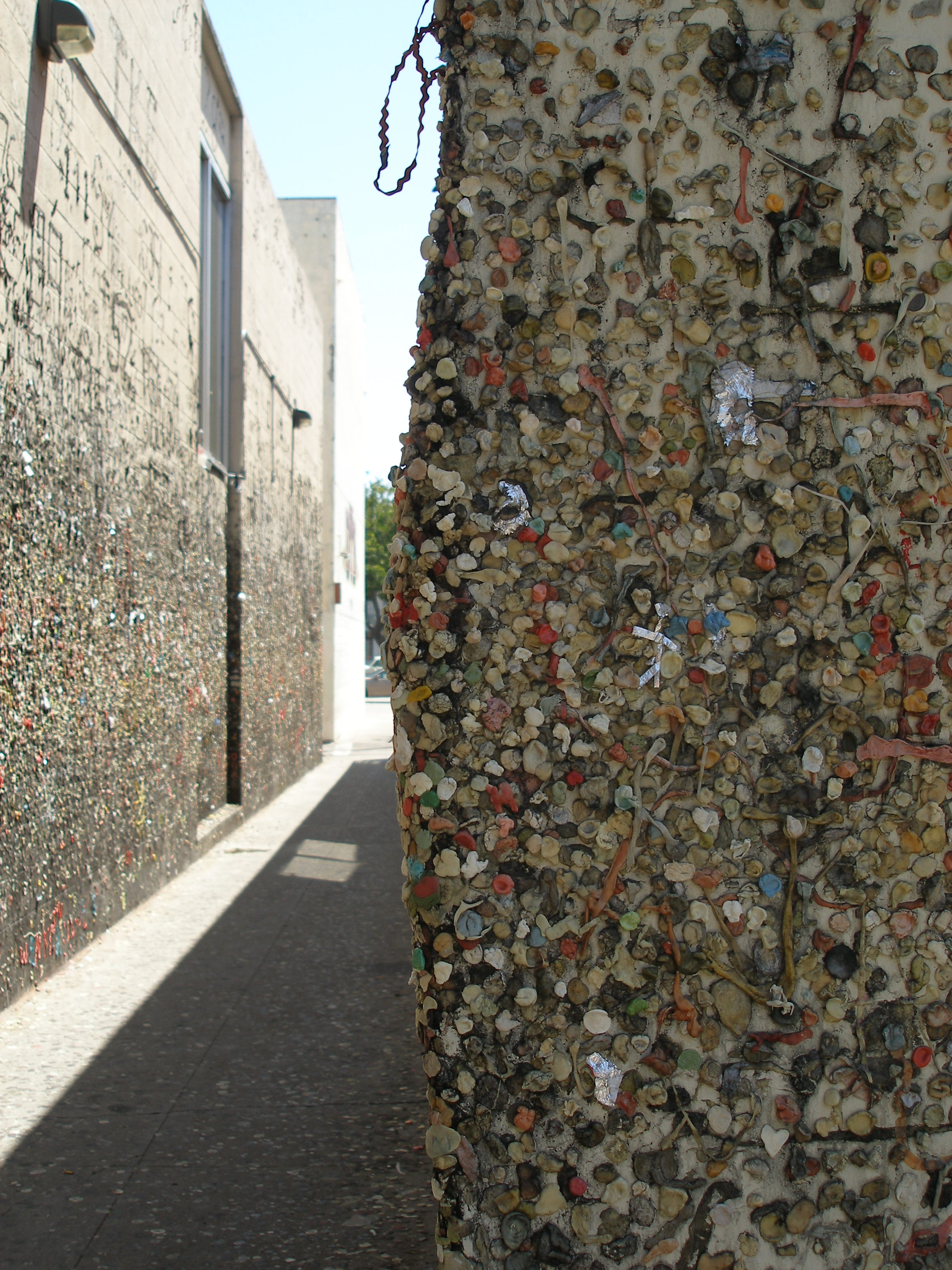

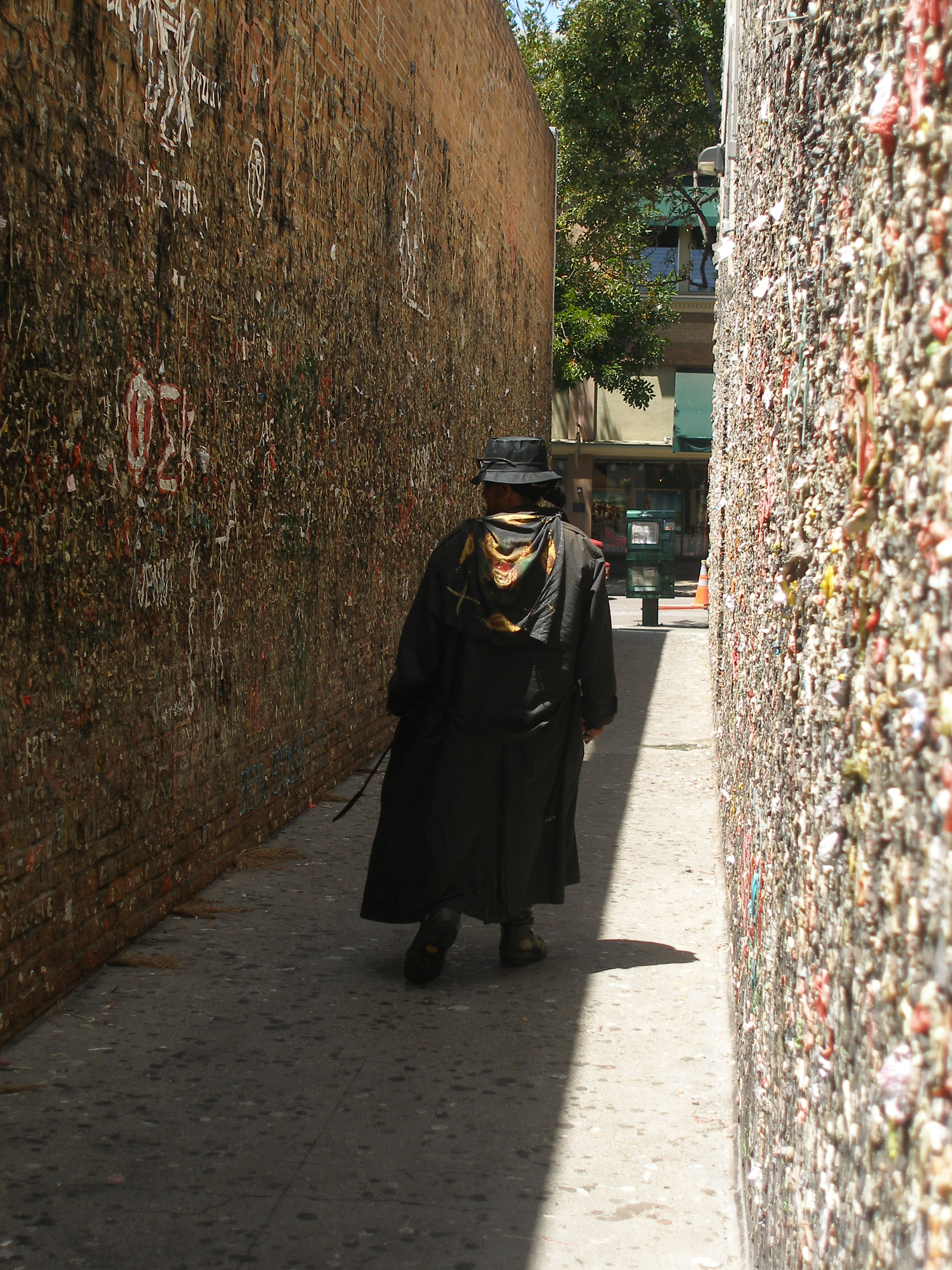

== See also ==
- Gum Wall in Seattle
