= Those Darn Accordions =

American accordion band

- Origin: San Francisco, California
- Genres: Rock, pop, polka, comedy
- Years active: 1989–present
- Labels: Globe Records, Flying Fish Records
- Members: Paul Rogers; Suzanne Garramone; Lewis Wallace; Michael Messer
- Website: www.thosedarnaccordions.com

Those Darn Accordions, commonly abbreviated as TDA, are an American accordion band from San Francisco, California, originally formed in 1989 by Linda "Big Lou" Seekins.

Boasting several accordionists whose numbers have fluctuated over the years and rounded out by a bassist and a drummer, Those Darn Accordions play a multi-genre mix of rock, pop and polka originals, characterized by the unusual use of effects and distortion on their accordions and the humorous lyrics of current frontman Paul Rogers. The band also performs from an extensive repertoire of covers, ranging from traditional accordion standards and polkas to hard rock, funk and new wave songs.

Since their formation, TDA have released six studio albums and one EP, with their most recent album Squeeze Machine having been released in 2007. As of 2014, the band continues to tour the United States, often performing as part of music festivals, fairs and Oktoberfest celebrations across the Pacific Northwest and Midwest.

== Biography ==
=== Early years (1989–1991) ===
The concept behind Those Darn Accordions was initially conceived by keyboardist and accordionist Linda "Big Lou" Seekins in early 1989. Seekins, who was active in several Bay Area bands including the polka punk band Polkacide, was called up by the owner of San Francisco's Paradise Lounge and offered an open performance slot if she could put together a band in time. As a joke, she contacted every accordionist she knew in an attempt to assemble an all-accordion band, ultimately recruiting thirteen accordionists to play the show, where they sight read "Beatles songs and polkas" before a packed house. Despite the disorganized and under-rehearsed nature of the band, the audience response was tremendous: "everyone liked us so much that they wanted an encore, and we'd already played everything we knew", Seekins recalled, "so we just had to play a song over again". Almost immediately, what was originally intended to be a one-time gag started developing into plans to become an ongoing project.

Shortly after their first few performances, member Tom Torriglia thought up the idea of carrying out a series of publicity stunts to help draw some attention to the band. Every few weeks the members began engaging in what were called "accordionista raids", where a mass group of accordionists – sometimes upwards of twenty or more – would run around town and barge uninvited into random restaurants, start playing accordion standards like "Lady of Spain" and "Beer Barrel Polka", announce the location of their next show and then quickly disperse "before the maître d' has time to throw us out". These raids effectively turned the group into local celebrities, and soon the band was not only receiving press coverage from the likes of the San Francisco Chronicle, The San Francisco Examiner, The New York Times and People magazine, but began receiving paid offers from the restaurants they had invaded to come back and play for their customers, once even being hired by Apple Inc. to interrupt one of their company meetings. It was during these raids that the band coined the name "Those Darn Accordions", and through their frequently changing line-ups eventually enlisted keyboardist and singer Paul Rogers as a member.

In 1990, TDA were invited to perform at an accordion festival in Castelfidardo, Italy. To help raise money for travel expenses, the band gathered at Washington Square park and played "Lady of Spain" for roughly ten hours straight, accepting tips and donations to keep them from playing ("For a $2,000 donation, we won't play for an hour!", Torriglia advertised). Successfully accruing their goal of $20,000, TDA traveled to Italy, where they discovered that instead of playing a music festival, they had inadvertently entered a serious accordion competition. Despite competing in the "pop" category, Rogers recalled that judges didn't respond well to the group's opening rendition of "Stairway to Heaven" and, due to a technicality, TDA ultimately placed fourth out of only two bands. Nevertheless, the audience reaction to TDA was overwhelmingly positive; the band even appeared on the front page of a local newspaper and were invited on the spot to perform at the International Accordion Festival in Vilnius, Lithuania, which they later did in 1992.

=== Studio albums and national touring (1992–2000) ===
TDA independently released their debut album Vongole Fisarmonica on cassette tape in 1992, featuring a seventeen-member line-up and largely consisting of cover songs including everything from "Beer Barrel Polka" and "Duck Dance" to "Stairway to Heaven" and "It's Not Unusual". Though the tape helped solidify the band's growing local fanbase, it did little to help them achieve the same kind of press attention as their accordionista raids. By this time, Rogers was taking a more prominent role in TDA as a singer-songwriter and had been elected as the group's de facto leader – according to him, "nobody else wanted to do it". Dissatisfied with their unkempt look and sound ("Everyone had to have sheet music on stands and the music would keep falling off...it was just not a band"), Rogers began restructuring TDA into a tighter rock band, placing a stronger emphasis on writing and performing original material. This major shift in direction, as well as Rogers' strict adherence to regular rehearsal sessions, would inevitably contribute to the departure of several members, whittling the band down to a more manageable unit of around eight to ten musicians.

A promotional picture of Those Darn Accordions, circa 1996.

In addition to tightening up their musicianship, TDA had also redefined their visual style into a uniquely offbeat and bizarre combination of retro and kitsch sensibilities, appropriating such attire as shiny lamé jackets, fishnet stockings, beehive hairdos, cat eye glasses and even a cowboy outfit, an aesthetic the Chicago Tribune described as looking like "The B-52s meet the Village People". Drawing upon their knack for self-promotion, TDA took quickly to merchandising, producing accordion-themed t-shirts bearing slogans like "Accordions Don't Play 'Lady of Spain' – People Do!" and bumper stickers reading "Pro-Accordion And I Vote!", which even won the San Francisco Bay Guardian award for "Bumper Sticker of the Year" in 1997. Perhaps the most peculiar element of TDA's sound and style, however, was member Clyde Forsman, a heavily tattooed senior who had joined the band's original line-up at the age of 74. Along with featuring prominently on their album covers and press photos, Forsman sang lead on several TDA songs, and soon became one of the main attractions of the band's concerts when he would sing The Jimi Hendrix Experience's "Fire" and Rod Stewart's "Da Ya Think I'm Sexy?", occasionally shirtless and always delivered in a deadpan monotone. Forsman performed and recorded with the group until 2000, and died on June 5, 2009, at the age of 94.

In 1994, TDA performed at the South by Southwest music festival in Austin, Texas, where they were offered a record deal by the Chicago-based independent label Flying Fish Records. Their sole album with Flying Fish, Squeeze This!, was a marked step forward from their debut, serving as a showcase for the band's new rock and pop-oriented original songs while still retaining their trademark flair for polkas and quirky covers. Already a popular live draw for their oddball concept and energetic stage shows, the resulting press from publications including Los Angeles Times and Entertainment Weekly giving Squeeze This! positive reviews generated enough buzz about the band to help them carry out larger-scale tours in clubs and festivals across the United States and Europe for most of the decade.

With the release of No Strings Attached in 1996, TDA experienced the peak of their pseudo-mainstream notoriety as they toured much of the United States and began making occasional appearances on national television, most notably performing on The Jim J. and Tammy Faye Show in 1996, Oddville, MTV in 1997, the Jerry Lewis MDA Labor Day Telethon in 1998, Penn & Teller's Sin City Spectacular in 1999 and Donny & Marie in 2000, in addition to numerous appearances on various local network affiliates. TDA's most prominent television exposure came in 1998, when the band appeared on that year's American Music Awards broadcast on ABC, performing an instrumental medley – arranged by Rogers – of former "Song of the Year" winners with accordionists Dick Contino, "Weird Al" Yankovic and event host Drew Carey. Carey, an admitted fan of TDA, specifically requested that TDA be involved with the segment after hearing their version of the "Perry Mason Theme" on Rhino Records' Legends of Accordion compilation. Carey would maintain friendly relations with the band afterwards, hiring them again to play the wrap parties for the fourth season of The Drew Carey Show in 1998 and the TV film Geppetto in 1999.

Following the release of TDA's fourth album Clownhead in August 1999, founder Seekins parted ways with the group to focus full-time on another accordion-based band she had formed, Big Lou's Polka Casserole, who released their debut album a month prior to Clownhead. In a 2006 interview, Seekins reflected on her decision to leave the band, feeling at odds with the more rock-oriented direction TDA was heading: "[T]hey wanted to be a groovy rock band, touring all the time, and playing rock clubs. And I liked the festivals we had been playing. [T]hey didn't want to play polkas anymore...So I recorded the polka album and it was just so much fun and I felt that it sounded more like music I wanted to play". TDA carried on, spending the rest of 1999 and 2000 touring across the United States.

=== Current activity (2001–present) ===
By 2001, TDA was operating with the smallest line-up of their career, consisting of a five-piece of accordionists Rogers, Patty Brady and Suzanne Garramone, bassist Lewis Wallace and drummer Bill Schwartz, all of whom had been with the band since Vongole Fisarmonica. That year, the quintet recorded a six-track EP entitled Amped, featuring a noticeably heavier and distorted rock sound than their previous albums. After carrying out their "Extreme Squeezeboxing Tour" into 2002, Brady would leave TDA the following year to move to Hawaii, being succeeded by accordionists Susie Davis and Carri Abrahms. Addressing the line-up changes, Rogers remarked San Antonio Express-News that "I've found four accordions is the right amount to re-create parts for songs"..."[a]fter about three accordions playing at once you can't tell who's doing what".

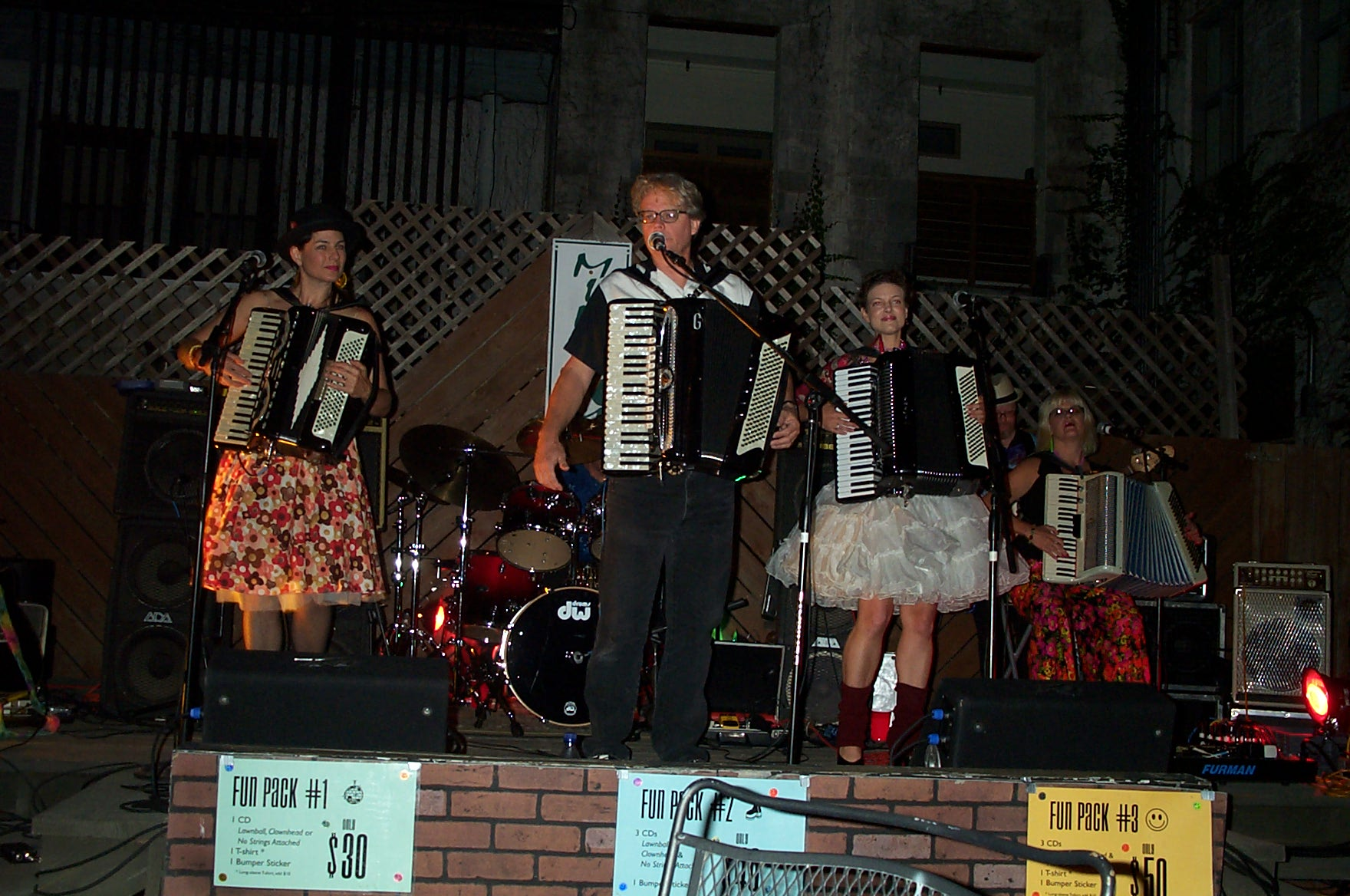
A recent photo of Those Darn Accordions performing in Champaign, Illinois.

Lawnball, TDA's fifth studio album, was released in July 2004, finding the band mostly returning to the pop and polka influences of their previous albums in place of the harder-edged rock of Amped, which still remained present on a pair of covers of Led Zeppelin's "Whole Lotta Love"/"Black Dog" and The Edgar Winter Group's "Frankenstein". After a few more years of sporadic touring and the departure of drummer Schwartz, TDA released Squeeze Machine in 2007, mixing elements of country, cabaret and New Orleans styles into the band's pop/rock influences, as well as featuring the "Glass of Beer Polka", a comic duet with Drew Carey.

TDA celebrated their 20th anniversary in 2009 and carried out a tour dubbed "20 Years, 20 Cities", taking them throughout California, Oregon, Washington, Wisconsin and Illinois. For the band's concert in Oshkosh, Wisconsin, TDA hosted an "Accordion Blowout" where they extended free admission to anyone bringing an accordion, leading a crowd of accordionists in a rendition of the "Beer Barrel Polka". The final stop of the tour was at the Cafe Du Nord nightclub in San Francisco, where former original members Big Lou and Tom Torriglia joined the band to perform a set of old favorites. To help promote the show, both current and past members of TDA reunited to carry out a series of "accordionista raids" on restaurants in North Beach.

In 2012, Rogers launched a successful crowdfunding campaign on RocketHub to help finance a Northwest tour for The Darn, a "power trio" treatment of his music featuring TDA bassist Lewis Wallace and Ian Luke, drummer for folk punk band The Mad Maggies, who accompanied The Darn on their tour. Rogers said The Darn was a chance to do something different with his songs, stripping them "down to their basics while allowing him to stretch out on the solos and bring a rawer edge to the sound".

As of 2014, Those Darn Accordions continue to sporadically play shows across the Pacific Northwest and occasional music festivals in the Midwest, though the band has made no indication of any future plans to return to recording or extensive touring.

== Musical and lyrical style ==
Since the earliest days of the band, Those Darn Accordions intended to play styles of music well beyond the scope of genres which traditionally incorporate the accordion. In a 1994 interview, Tom Torriglia stated bluntly "We're of the mindset that there's absolutely no musical style that cannot be played on the accordion", while Big Lou once eloquently queried "the accordion is just a portable acoustic organ...other bands use organs in their rock songs, so I figured why can't we use accordions in our rock song remakes and originals?"

Although polka plays a major role in TDA's sound and the band has dabbled in various accordion-centric styles including tango, Cajun and New Orleans music, Tejano and conjunto, and French bal-musette, TDA is foremost rooted in rock and pop music, with frontman Rogers listing Elvis Costello, Joe Jackson and Randy Newman among his major songwriting influences. The band's studio albums have featured songs in styles such as ska, funk, folk, mambo and country and western music, while their cover songs have spanned swing, bluegrass, surf, new wave, synthpop, hard rock and even heavy metal. As a whole, the Chicago Tribune once called TDA's sound a cross between "Lawrence Welk and Led Zeppelin", while band leader Rogers has described it as more akin to "Lawrence Welk meets The B-52s".

Structurally, TDA has always consisted of multiple accordionists backed by a rhythm section of bass guitar and drums, though the band's earliest shows prior to the release of their first album were typically all-accordion ensembles. One of the most distinctive characteristics of TDA is their use of distortion and effects units like wah-wah pedals on their accordions to achieve a wider range of sounds, using them much like an electric organ on their heavier and more rock-oriented songs. Beginning with their fourth album Clownhead, TDA began using more outside instruments on their studio recordings, primarily using acoustic guitar and piano, while later albums included violin, banjo, glockenspiel, tuba, trumpet, clarinet, harmonica and ukulele.

Paul Rogers has been TDA's main lyricist since the early 1990s and usually writes in a humorously observational and narrative style, covering such mundane topics as bowling, lawn decorations and the difficulties of tandem bikes while sometimes venturing into more farcical material about accordion-snatching extraterrestrials, the Loch Ness monster and Japanese monster movies. Some of the band's comic appeal comes from their frequent covers of songs from genres not typically associated with accordions, with a few of such covers being reworked as parodies – for example, hard rock band Grand Funk Railroad's "We're an American Band" having been re-written as "We're an Accordion Band" on Squeeze This!. Despite the novelty nature of the band, TDA have always considered themselves "artists first and comics second". Nearly all of the accordionists have been classically trained pianists; among them, Rogers has a Bachelor of Music, and Suzanne Garramone holds a master's degree in piano performance and works as an adjunct professor of music at the University of San Francisco.

== Related bands and side projects ==
Prior to joining TDA, Paul Rogers fronted and played keyboards for the San Francisco rock bands The Dinks, Jimmy Knight and the Daze and the Baxter Brothers, and since TDA has played keys for the country group Transistor Rodeo and contributes several instruments to the "acoustic folk-skiffle-swing holiday" ensemble The Christmas Jug Band, the latter of which Rogers has also composed numerous songs for, including the humorous "Santa Lost a Ho" which NPR voted Christmas Song of the Year in 2005. Rogers has also released solo recordings through TDA's website, and in 2010 released his first solo CD under his name, a folk and rock children's music album entitled The Cul-de-Sac Kids.

Throughout the 1980s, Linda "Big Lou" Seekins played keyboards and recorded with the Bay Area all-girl rockabilly band The Stir-Ups and roots rock band Thee Hellcats, and most notably played accordion with the polka punk band Polkacide. Since her departure from TDA in the 1990s, Big Lou has fronted several bands including the polka band Big Lou's Dance Party (formerly Big Lou's Polka Casserole), the bal-musette group Baguette Quartette, recording multiple albums with both, as well as the French cabaret trio Salute Matelot.

Suzanne Garramone was also a member of Polkacide with Seekins, and later co-founded the oboe/piano duo Classical Trash. Susie Davis has an extensive background as a session keyboardist and backing vocalist, having toured and recorded with artists including Sheila E., Hall & Oates, Mick Jagger and The Rubinoos, and appeared on The Tonight Show backing Melissa Etheridge and on Saturday Night Live with Sinéad O'Connor. Carri Abrahms is a classically trained singer who has worked with the San Francisco Symphony Chorus, the Philharmonia Baroque Chorale and the Dark Cabaret band Rosin Coven.

== Discography ==
Studio albums

Year	Title	Label
1992	Vongole Fisarmonica	Globe Records
1994	Squeeze This!	Flying Fish Records
1996	No Strings Attached	Globe Records
1999	Clownhead	Globe Records
2004	Lawnball	Globe Records
2007	Squeeze Machine	Globe Records

EPs

Year	Title	Label
2002	Amped	Globe Records

Compilation appearances

Year	Title	Track	Label
1994	FMQB: Progressions Number Nine (New Music for Progressive Adult Radio)	"We're An Accordion Band"	Friday Morning Quarterback Album Report, Inc.
1994	Live 105 – SF Local Bands	"The Bowling King"	Reel George Productions
1995	Legends of Accordion	"Perry Mason Theme"	Rhino Records
1999	Happy New Millennium and The Globe Compilation	"First Bratwurst of Summer"	Globe Records
2000	Joe's Blue Plate Special: The Best of the Unsigned Indies, Vol. 16 & 17	"They Came for Accordions"	Joe's Production & Grille, Inc.
2000	Cajun Pride	"The Devil Went Down to Georgia"	
2005	Dr. Demento's Basement Tapes #13	"There's Another Dumbass on the Mountain"	The Demento Society

== Band members ==
Current line-up

- Paul Rogers – vocals, accordion, piano, acoustic guitar
- Suzanne Garramone – accordion, vocals
- Lewis Wallace – electric bass
- Ian Luke – drums, percussion

Former members

- Bill Schwartz – drums, percussion, vocals
- Michael Messer – drums, percussion
- Carri Abrahms – accordion, vocals
- Ron "Riff" Borelli – accordion
- Patty Brady – accordion, vocals
- Susie Davis – accordion, vocals, vocal arrangements
- Clyde Forsman – accordion, vocals
- Ron "The Filipino Elvis" Muriera – accordion, vocals
- Art "California Pete" Peterson – accordion, vocals
- Linda "Big Lou" Seekins – accordion, vocals
- Tom Torriglia – accordion
