= Five by Five =

Five by Five may refer to:

== Communications ==
- The best possible radio signal report in some modern signal strength and readability report systems.

== Sports ==
- Five-by-five (basketball), an individual basketball performance in which a player has five in five categories
- Professor's Cube, the 5x5x5 version of the Rubik's Cube

== Media ==
- "Five by Five" (Angel), an episode of television series Angel
- Five by Five (band), a 1960s–1970s Arkansas-based band

=== Music albums ===
- Five by Five (Pizzicato Five EP)
- Five by Five (The Rolling Stones EP)
- Five by Five, a 1997 EP by the Verve
- VxV or Five by Five, an album by Wolves at the Gate
- 5 by 5 (Dave Clark Five album), 1967
- Five by Five (The Hooters EP), 2010 studio album by American rock band The Hooters

=== Songs ===
- "Five By Five", by The Dave Clark Five 1970

== See also ==
- "Mr. Five by Five", a 1942 song by Freddie Slack and His Orchestra
  - Jimmy Rushing, known as "Mr. Five by Five" and the subject of the above song
- 5/5 or May 5
