= Vongole Fisarmonica =

Studio album by Those Darn Accordions
- Released: 1992
- Recorded: 1992 at Globe Studios
- Genre: Rock, pop, polka
- Length: 32:56
- Label: Globe Records
- Producer: Paul Rogers

Those Darn Accordions chronology
Vongole Fisarmonica (1992)	Squeeze This! (1994)

Vongole Fisarmonica is the debut album by American accordion band Those Darn Accordions, released in 1992 by Globe Records. The album was originally released only on cassette tape before later being made available for digital download on iTunes and similar digital media stores.

== Overview ==
Showcasing a seventeen-member line-up, Vongole Fisarmonica documents TDA at the peak of their early formation as a mostly instrumental mass accordion ensemble, before bandleader Paul Rogers would start restructuring the group into a tighter ten-member rock band for their subsequent album, Squeeze This!. In contrast to the rest of TDA's discography, Vongole Fisarmonica primarily consists of cover songs, tackling TDA's typical fare of classic polkas and offbeat covers of hard rock and pop songs. The album contains two original songs in "Lithuania" and "Chicken Boy Polka", as well as a parody of Arthur Godfrey's "Too Fat Polka", re-written as "Too Smart Polka".

The title of the album is Italian for "Accordion Clams". According to member Tom Torriglia, musicians would often call mistakes "clams".

== Track listing ==
No.	Title	Writer(s)	Length
1.	"Also sprach Zarathustra/Viva Las Vegas"	R. Strauss/D. Pomus/M. Shuman	4:03
2.	"Stairway to Heaven"	J. Page/R. Plant	4:13
3.	"Walk, Don't Run"	J. Smith	1:54
4.	"The Beer Barrel Polka"	L. Brown/W. Timm	3:04
5.	"Too Smart Polka"	R. MacLean/A. Richardson	2:19
6.	"Lithuania"	P. Rogers	2:22
7.	"It's Now or Never"	W. Gold/A. Schroeder/E. di Capua	3:18
8.	"Duck Dance"	W. Thomas	4:39
9.	"It's Not Unusual"	L. Reed/G. Mills	2:07
10.	"Chicken Boy Polka"	P. Rogers/T. Torriglia	2:23
11.	"Perry Mason Theme"	F. Steiner	2:34
Total length:			32:56

== Personnel ==
Those Darn Accordions

- Tom Torriglia - accordion, lead vocals on track 5
- Linda "Big Lou" Seekins - accordion
- Suzanne Garramone - accordion
- Clyde Forsman - accordion, lead vocals on track 4
- Ron "Riff" Borelli - accordion
- Ron "The Other Ron" Muriera - accordion
- Chris Howard - accordion
- Art Peterson - accordion
- Piper Heisig - accordion
- Paul Rogers - accordion, lead vocals on tracks 6 and 10
- J. Raoul Bordy - accordion
- Caroline Dahl - accordion
- Patty Brady - accordion
- Bill Schwartz - drums
- Maurice Cridlin - bass guitar
- Michael Lindner - accordion
- Tony Johnson - accordion
