= Thomas Werner =

Thomas Werner or Tom Werner may refer to:

- Thomas Werner, German youth who committed suicide in an all male gymnasium, inspiring The Heart of Thomas, a 1974 Japanese manga series written and illustrated by Moto Hagio
- Thomas Werner Laurie (1866–1944), London publisher of books
- Tom Werner, or Thomas Charles Werner (born 1950), American television producer and businessman
- Tom Preston-Werner (born 1979), American billionaire software developer and entrepreneur and CEO of GitHub

== See also ==
- Werner Thomas, Swiss accordionist
