= Beer Barrel Polka =

Popular song during World War II

"Škoda lásky"
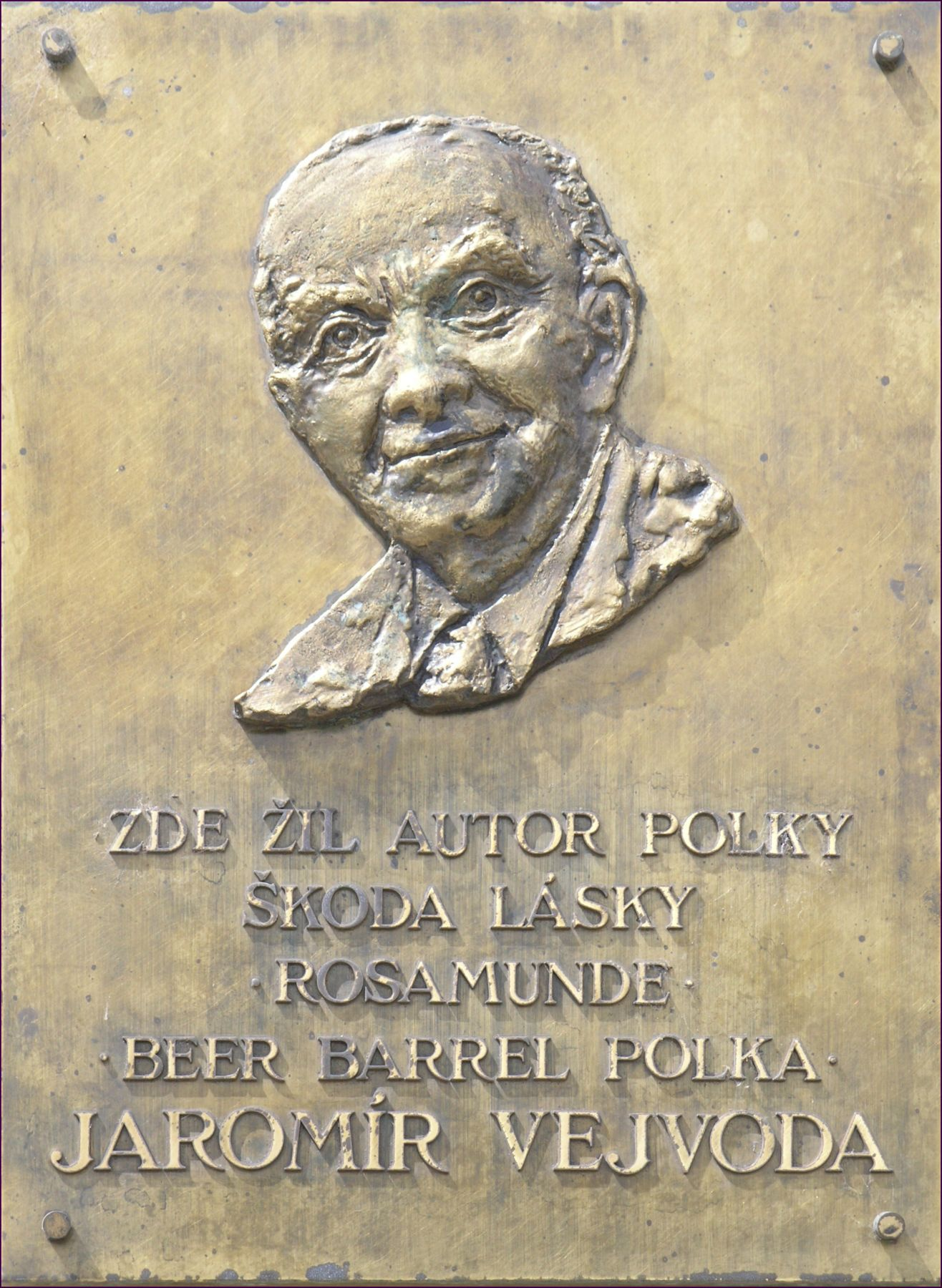
- Memorial plaque of the author with the song's name in Czech, German and English

Song
- Language: Czech
- English title: "Beer Barrel Polka"
- Written: 1927 (music), 1934 (lyrics)
- Composer: Jaromír Vejvoda (from "Modřanská polka")
- Lyricist: Vašek Zeman

"Beer Barrel Polka", originally in Czech "Škoda lásky", also known as "The Barrel Polka", "Roll Out the Barrel", or "Rosamunde", is a 1927 polka composed by Czech musician Jaromír Vejvoda. Lyrics were added in 1934, subsequently gaining worldwide popularity during World War II as a drinking song.

== History ==
In 1927, the music for the polka was composed by the Czech musician Jaromír Vejvoda. Eduard Ingriš wrote the first arrangement of the piece, after Vejvoda came up with the melody and sought Ingriš's help in refining it. At that time, it was played without lyrics as "Modřanská polka" (English: "Polka of Modřany").

In 1934, the first text for the polka was written by Vašek Zeman – with the title "Škoda lásky" (English: "Unrequited Love" (Note: The Czech title has been translated into English in slightly different ways by various sources, but all capture the same basic meaning. For example, Greene (1992) says "Unrequited Love", Vallier (2021) says "Wasted Love," and Larkin (1992) says "Lost Love".)) Around that same time, Shapiro Bernstein acquired the rights to the song and English lyrics were written by Lew Brown and Wladimir Timm. Zeman's original Czech lyrics framed the polka as a love song, whereas Brown and Timm's English version framed it as a song celebrating the repeal of Prohibition in the United States. At first the English version of the song was relatively unknown and unpopular, but it gained a great deal of popularity after The Andrews Sisters recorded it in 1939.. Subsequently, many other artists released versions, including the Glenn Miller Orchestra; Benny Goodman; Bobby Vinton; Billie Holiday; John Serry Sr (RCA Thesaurus, 1954) and Joe Patek, who sold over a million copies of his album "Beer Barrel Polka".

The polka soon became famous around the world. In 1939 Will Glahé recorded an instrumental version that was a big hit in the United States, being ranked #3 by the radio program Your Hit Parade in June of that year.. The June 17, 1939 edition of Billboard magazine noted that "Beer Barrel Polka" was the 12th most popular song by radio plays on New York City radio stations WJZ, WEAF and WABC. Daniel Richman wrote "There's hardly a [jukebox] machine from Maine to California that still isn't inviting patrons to roll out the barrel, and from all indications it will probably be another couple of weeks before the 'roll out' can be changed to 'throw out.'"

During World War II, versions in many other languages were created and the song was popular among soldiers, regardless of their allegiances. Italian writer Primo Levi wrote that when he was deported to Auschwitz, the camp's orchestra was playing "Rosamunde", the German version of "Beer Barrel Polka," as he arrived. According to Time magazine, when the first Australian contingent of troops arrived in England, they were singing the polka. On VE Day—May 8 or 9, 1945—Humphrey Lyttelton played it standing on a handcart outside Buckingham Palace, a performance that could be heard in the BBC broadcast from the victory celebrations.

It was claimed many times that the song was written in the country where it had just become a hit. Time wrote that "Germans insisted it was an old Bavarian drinking song. Americans and British thought it was one of their own. Anyhow, they all sang it." Its actual composer was not widely known until after the war.

== Names in other languages ==
- Basque: "Gora ta gora beti"
- Catalan: "La polca de la cervesa"
- Chinese: "啤酒桶波尔卡/啤酒桶波爾卡"
- Croatian: "Rozamunda", "Terezinka"
- Czech: "Škoda lásky"
- Danish: "Hvor er min Kone"
- Dutch: "Rosamunde" (also "Rats, kuch en bonen")
- Finnish: "Tonttujen joulupolkka, Böömiläinen polkka"
- French: "Frida oum Papa"
- Greek: "Ροζαμούντα"
- German: "Rosamunde"
- Hungarian: "Sej-haj Rozi"
- Italian: "Rosamunda"
- Japanese: "ビヤ樽ポルカ, ビア樽ポルカ"
- Latvian: "Rozamunde" "Terezinka"
- Norwegian: "Hvor er min kone"
- Polish: "Banda" or "My młodzi, my młodzi, nam bimber nie zaszkodzi..." or "Szkoda miłości"
- Portuguese: "Barril de chope"
- Russian: "Розамунда"
- Spanish: "Polka del Barril, el Barrilito", "Polca de la Cerveza" or "Barrilito de Cerveza"
- Swedish: "Ut i naturen
- Ukrainian: "Не вернуться роки мої молоді(Ne vernuťśa roku koji molodi)"

== Covers and homages ==
=== Music ===
- Bobby Vinton recorded "Beer Barrel Polka" in 1975. The song was released as the follow-up single to his multi-million selling "My Melody of Love" and reached number 33 on the Billboard, number 45 on the Cashbox Top 40 hit charts and number 51 in Australia. The success of the single, which was particularly popular on jukeboxes, led to its inclusion on Vinton's Heart of Hearts album in 1975.
- The song became a signature song of well-known entertainer Liberace, and he played it on an episode of his eponymous television show.
- Jimmy Sturr & His Orchestra made their own composition of "Beer Barrel Polka".
- The song is a standard for the accordion rock band Those Darn Accordions, who released a studio version in 1992 on their album Vongole Fisarmonica.
- John Serry Sr. arranged and recorded the polka for accordion and ensemble for RCA Thesaurus (1954).
- The theme was interpreted in Spanish over the years by various artists such as Manolita Arriola from Mexico, Elsa Valladares from Cuba, Gildardo Montoya and El Grupo Venezuela, Los Hermanos Corrales from Colombia, the group "Los Mismos" from Spain, Anteojito from Argentina, among others.

=== Sports ===
- Since the 1970s, it has been played during the seventh inning stretch at Milwaukee Brewers baseball games, as well as becoming one of the state of Wisconsin's unofficial state songs as it is also played at numerous University of Wisconsin sporting events, as well as Green Bay Packers home games.
- The 2016 Premiership winning Australian National Rugby League club Cronulla-Sutherland Sharks' theme song, Up Up Cronulla, uses the tune of Beer Barrel Polka.
- At San Jose Giants home games, a batter from the opposing team is designated the "beer batter." If the San Jose pitcher strikes out that batter, beer is half price in the beer only lines for the 15 minutes immediately following the strike out. The PA system plays "Beer Barrel Polka" whenever the beer batter comes to the plate and after every strike during the beer batter's at-bat.
- Pro wrestler Crusher Lisowski used the song as his entrance music, and would often growl out a few bars of it during interviews.
- The German football club Bayern München use the tune of "Rosamunde" for their song FC Bayern, lala lalala lala.

=== Plays, movies and television programs ===
- Chico Marx of the Marx Brothers plays a variation of this song in the 1939 movie At the Circus and later reprised it in 1946’s A Night in Casablanca.
- An instrumental version is featured in the 1941 film Meet John Doe.
- In the 1946 film The Captive Heart, a group of British POWs in a German camp sing the Beer Barrel Polka to drown out the sound of a German propaganda song that their captors are playing over the loudspeakers.
- In the 1967 film Late August at the Hotel Ozone a 78 rpm record of the polka is the last surviving piece of music.
- At the opening of each episode of the second series of Yanks Go Home, the song plays in the background.
- In Carl Davis's 1990 score for 1916 epic silent drama Intolerance, Davis incorporates the Beer Barrel Polka at the "Strike" scene at 17:33, despite the scene taking place in 1916, a decade before the song was written.
- It is the main theme for the 1985 classic argentinian comedy Esperando la Carroza.
