= Henry Hadaway =

British musical artist (born 1942)

Henry Hadaway MBE
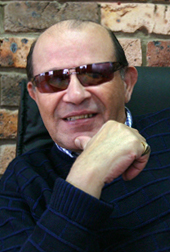
- Hadaway in 2007

Background information
- Born: Henry William Elias; 31 May 1942 (age 83); Jerusalem, British Mandate Palestine
- Origin: London, England
- Occupations: Record producer; film producer; television producer; show promoter; entrepreneur
- Years active: 1969–present
- Labels: Satril Records, Crash, HHO, Javelin
- Website: www.henryhadaway.com www.hho.co.uk

Henry William Hadaway MBE (born 31 May 1942), born as Henry William Ellis, he was the chairman and founder of Henry Hadaway Organisation (HHO), is considered a pioneer of UK independent record labels, and most notably successful for his production of "The Birdie Song" which was a hit credited to The Tweets and peaked at number 2 in the UK Singles Chart. He is known as a record, film and television producer, show promoter and aspiring entrepreneur.

== Early years ==
Hadaway started his career in 1969 as a promotion and management agent, sponsoring and producing gigs throughout the 1970s. Under the brand's "Satril Management" and "Big Ear Promotions", he booked famous names including David Bowie, Iggy Pop, Wishbone Ash and Matt Monro for shows at London venues including The Palladium, the former Mean Fiddler, The Marquee and The Lyceum. He is notably responsible for coining the prestigious "Sunday Rock at the Lyceum". Hadaway also hosted a variety of big acts from the Motown label including The Four Tops, Marv Johnson, Jimmy Ruffin and Edwin Starr.

In 1971, Henry Hadaway founded HHO (the "Henry Hadaway Organisation") that to this day operates internationally as a multimedia licensor. Surviving over 48 years, HHO is considered one of the longest running UK independents and controls copyrights for over 20,000 audio and visual titles.

== Satril years ==
In 1973, Hadaway founded Satril Records, – a record label that went on to release many well-known rock and disco titles. Satril's label identity had over 25 different territories and achieved success on the recording front with such acts as the easy listening trio The Sandpipers, who charted with "Hang on Sloopy", Kenny Lynch, who had a best-seller with "Half The Day's Gone And We Haven't Earned a Penny", and Godiego, who were a hit in the Japanese market (sales of over 32 million units). In one quarter, Godeigo under Hadaway's jurisdiction had two albums and three best-selling singles.

In parallel to running Satril Records, Hadaway founded and managed Satril Studios (a recording studio based in Finchley) that was regularly used by such top industry names as producers including Biddu and Steve Levine, and acts including Marvin Gaye and Kenny Lynch amongst the many others that came to record, produce and feature in sessions. Hadaway himself produced records for artists including Burnt Oak (better known as Mr. Big), The Sandpipers, The Rockin' Berries, Connie Francis and Frankie Vaughan. His most renowned production to date however is "The Birdie Song" (performed by The Tweets) which sold over 1.6 million copies in the UK alone, and is rated one of the best sellers during the 1980s. "The Birdie Song" was played on Top of the Pops in 1981. Hadaway was interviewed on Channel 4 about his production of this track.

== 1980s ==
During the 1980s, Hadaway acquired numerous audio and visual catalogues. Through a deal with Florida-based comedian/impresario Mike Winters, Hadaway became responsible for the catalogues of Church Street Station and Rock 'N' Roll Palace music TV, video and record series, which attracted such names as Tammy Wynette, Merle Haggard, George Jones and Jerry Lee Lewis.

Hadaway's success in the music industry has fundamentally been accredited to an international outlook – operating in and communicating with both domestic and international territories. He opened offices for HHO in Cleveland and Nashville, United States; and Sydney, Australia. He also established strong business relations with the Asian and Far East markets. Throughout the decade, Hadaway continued to promote gigs in Europe, including a festival in Malta (December 1989) on the occasion of the historic summit between President's George H. W. Bush and Mikael Gorbachev. Working closely with the first Maltese Prime Minister Dom Mintoff, Hadaway staged "Give Peace A Chance", a concert to promote world peace. The concert featured international pop names including Chris de Burgh, Leo Sayer, Sinitta, Aimii Stewart, Heatwave and Aswad. Hadaway was interviewed on Maltese TV about his contributions to the music industry during this time.

== Visual production ==
In more recent times, Hadaway has branched further into visual media, producing programmes tailored for broadcast including the Peter Green documentary Man of the World (2009), shown on BBC and Sky Arts. He also co-wrote the script for the film, Inside Out.

== Awards ==
Over the years, Hadaway has been a continued annual presence at the MIDEM music market in Cannes, for which various awards have been credited for contributions to the industry and to the convention itself, including two awards from the Mayors of Cannes.

In 2013, Henry Hadaway was awarded an MBE for services to the creative industry.
