= Fire (The Jimi Hendrix Experience song) =

1967 song by the Jimi Hendrix Experience

- German single picture sleeve

Song by the Jimi Hendrix Experience

from the album Are You Experienced
- Released: May 12, 1970 (UK); August 23, 1971 (US)
- Recorded: January 11 & February 8, 1967
- Studio: De Lane Lea & Olympic, London
- Genre: Psychedelic rock; funk; soul; hard rock
- Length: 2:30
- Label: Track (UK); Reprise (US)
- Songwriter: Jimi Hendrix
- Producer: Chas Chandler

"Fire" is a song written by Jimi Hendrix and recorded by the Jimi Hendrix Experience in early 1967. It has been described as "an exercise in soul, psychedelic rock, and polyrhythmic jazz-inspired drumming" by AllMusic critic Matthew Greenwald. The song has often been described as a duet between Hendrix and his drummer, Mitch Mitchell. The song was remixed in stereo for the American release of the album. In 1969, it was released as a stereo single in the UK with the title "Let Me Light Your Fire".

One of Hendrix's most popular songs, he frequently played it in concert. Several live recordings have been released and the original song is included on numerous Hendrix compilations, such as Smash Hits, Experience Hendrix: The Best of Jimi Hendrix, Voodoo Child: The Jimi Hendrix Collection, and Fire: The Jimi Hendrix Collection.

== Overview ==
Despite its sexual overtones, the song had an innocuous origin. Noel Redding, bass player for the Experience, invited Hendrix to his mother's house on a cold New Year's Eve in Folkestone, England, after a performance. Hendrix asked Noel's mother if he could stand next to her fireplace to warm himself. She agreed, but her German Shepherd was in the way, so Hendrix let out with, "Aw, move over, Rover, and let Jimi take over". Hendrix later joked with the lyric: "Old Mother Hubbard went to the cupboard to find her poor dog a bone, but when she bent over Rover took over, 'cause Rover had a bone of his own! Shakespeare, page 35!"

== Music video ==
In 1992, an animated music video was produced by director Susan Young, based on archive footage from the live rendition of "Fire" by Hendrix at the 1970 edition of the Isle of Wight music festival.

== Red Hot Chili Peppers version ==
The Red Hot Chili Peppers began performing "Fire" in 1983 and recorded it as a B-side for their 1987 "Fight Like a Brave" single and a year later released it on The Abbey Road E.P.. The song was also included on their 1989 album, Mother's Milk, as a tribute to the band's founding guitarist Hillel Slovak who died in 1988. The Chili Peppers version features lead singer Anthony Kiedis changing some of the lyrics such as "Move over, Rover, and let Jimi take over" to "Move over, Rover, and let Mr. Huckleberry take over" for Slovak (who was also known by his nickname, "Mr. Huckleberry"). It was the final song played in the Chili's setlist at Woodstock '99, which drew criticism from some news outlets.

== Other versions ==
A 1968 rendition by Five by Five reached number 52 on the national Billboard singles chart. Kingston Wall covered it on their 1992 debut album I. In 1994, the accordion-based rock band Those Darn Accordions recorded a version for their 1994 album Squeeze This!, where it was sung by a then 79-year-old Clyde Forsman, one of the group's accordionists. Alice Cooper covered it on his 1995 compilation album Classicks. SSQ covered the song as a B-side to their single "Synthicide". Ghanaian Afro-rock band Osibisa covered the song on their 1973 album Happy Children.

The song is frequently performed by the University of California, Los Angeles' marching band at UCLA Bruins football games. It also is currently the postgame victory song for the Seattle Mariners Major League Baseball team. The guitar riff is used in Green Day's "Father of All..."
