= Squeeze This! =

Studio album by Those Darn Accordions
- Released: 12 July 1994
- Genre: Rock, pop, polka, comedy
- Length: 42:20
- Label: Flying Fish Records
- Producer: Paul Rogers

Those Darn Accordions chronology
Vongole Fisarmonica (1992)	Squeeze This! (1994)	No Strings Attached (1996)

Squeeze This! is the second studio album by American accordion band Those Darn Accordions, released in 1994 on Flying Fish Records. This was the only TDA album to be released on Flying Fish, as the rest of the band's discography was released by the Petaluma-based independent label Globe Records.

== Overview ==
With a significantly reduced line-up from the seventeen members on TDA's debut Vongole Fisarmonica, Squeeze This! captured the group at their transition from a loose ensemble of accordionists into a tighter rock band, featuring a noticeably stronger emphasis on original material under the new leadership of primary singer-songwriter Paul Rogers rather than the cover songs that made up the majority of the preceding album. In addition to their rock, pop and polka originals, Squeeze This! covers such broad styles as ska, swing and bluegrass.

Critical reception to Squeeze This! was largely positive. The Los Angeles Times praised the album as "fun", putting particular emphasis on the original songs that "inhabit a loopy middle ground between The B-52s and Talking Heads" and making note of the "stylistically credible" musicianship, something which The Santa Cruz Sentinel also echoed, dismissing the "novelty" tag and calling them "inspired performers".

== Track listing ==
No.	Title	Writer(s)	Length
1.	"We're An Accordion Band"	D. Brewer	2:51
2.	"The Bowling King"	P. Rogers/B. Schwartz/L. Wallace/A. Peterson	3:30
3.	"The Story of Lawrence Welk"	P. Rogers	5:07
4.	"Viva Seguin"	S. Jiménez	2:29
5.	"The Devil Went Down to Georgia"	C. Daniels/T. Crain/T. DiGregorio/F. Edwards/C. Hayward/J. Marshall	3:39
6.	"Trouble In The Love Bubble"	P. Rogers	2:51
7.	"Yoo Hoo Polka"	L. Seekins	2:26
8.	"Grodno In The Moonlight"	P. Rogers	2:36
9.	"Fire"	J. Hendrix	2:34
10.	"Miner's Polka"	A. Peterson	1:26
11.	"Sing, Sing, Sing"	L. Prima	4:18
12.	"Autumn In Vilnius"	P. Rogers/R. Borelli/T. Torriglia	3:14
13.	"Pump It Up"	E. Costello	2:48
14.	"Boy Crazy"	L. Seekins/E. Whiteway	2:31
Total length:			42:20

== Personnel ==
Those Darn Accordions

- Linda "Big Lou" Seekins - accordion, lead vocals (1, 3, 14), background vocals
- Ron "Riff" Borelli - accordion
- Patty Brady - accordion, lead vocals (1), background vocals
- Art "California Pete" Peterson - accordion, lead vocals (5, 7)
- Clyde Forsman - accordion, lead vocals (9)
- Suzanne Garramone - accordion, background vocals
- Paul Rogers - accordion, lead vocals (2, 3, 6, 8, 13), background vocals
- Bill Schwartz - drums, percussion, background vocals
- Tom Torriglia - accordion
- Lewis Wallace - bass
