= No Strings Attached (Those Darn Accordions album) =

Studio album by Those Darn Accordions
- Released: June 18, 1996
- Recorded: 1996 at Tiki Town, Marin County, United States
- Genre: Rock, pop, comedy, polka
- Length: 48:30
- Label: Globe Records
- Producer: Scott Mathews

Those Darn Accordions chronology
Squeeze This! (1994)	No Strings Attached (1996)	Clownhead (1999)

No Strings Attached is the third studio album by American accordion band Those Darn Accordions, released on June 18, 1996 by Globe Records.

== Overview ==
Released at the height of TDA's popularity, No Strings Attached showcases the band's trademark mixture of accordion-driven rock, pop and polka, as well as boasting ska, funk and jazz influences. The album notably features two cover songs, one of The Who's "Baba O'Riley" and the other of Rod Stewart's "Da Ya Think I'm Sexy?", the latter sung by TDA's then-81-year-old member Clyde Forsman.

In a positive review, the Memphis Flyer called TDA "the true champions" of the alternative music scene's revival of the accordion, ahead of Brave Combo and They Might Be Giants. The review concluded "This is one recording filled with good-natured humor where the novelty doesn't wear off, because there's a wealth of musical integrity behind it. Those Darn Accordions! are blazing a trail down a path that most fear to tread, and they're doing it with panache and aplomb".

== Track listing ==
No.	Title	Writer(s)	Length
1.	"Mothra"	P. Rogers/B. Schwartz/L. Wallace	3:19
2.	"Behind the Bellows"	P. Rogers	3:27
3.	"Them Hippies Was Right"	P. Rogers/B. Schwartz/L. Wallace	4:13
4.	"Ramune"	L. Seekins	1:59
5.	"The Hotsy Totsy Polka"	L. Seekins/P. Rogers/A. Peterson/S. Mathews	3:21
6.	"Baba O'Riley"	P. Townshend	4:53
7.	"Citizen Contraire"	P. Rogers	3:45
8.	"Paco's Dream"	P. Rogers	3:13
9.	"Deathbed Confession"	P. Rogers	2:50
10.	"Following the Puppets"	P. Rogers	3:35
11.	"Hamsterman"	P. Rogers	3:55
12.	"Mambo Triste"	L. Seekins	2:52
13.	"The Happy House"	P. Rogers/S. Mathews	3:18
14.	"Da Ya Think I'm Sexy?"	R. Stewart/C. Appice/D. Hitchings	3:50
Total length:			48:30

== Personnel ==
Those Darn Accordions

- Linda "Big Lou" Seekins - accordion, lead vocals (5, 13), background vocals
- Patty Brady - accordion, lead vocals (13), background vocals
- Clyde Forsman - accordion, lead vocals (13, 14), background vocals
- Suzanne Garramone - accordion, lead vocals (13), background vocals
- Art Peterson - accordion, lead vocals (5, 13), background vocals
- Paul Rogers - accordion, lead vocals (1, 2, 3, 6, 7, 9, 10, 11, 13)
- Bill Schwartz - drums, percussion, background vocals
- Lewis Wallace - bass guitar

Additional musicians

- Dick Contino - solo accordion on tracks 5 & 12
- "Weird Al" Yankovic - vocals on track 13
- John Moore - tuba
- Danute Janutiene - vocals on track 4
