= Lawnball =

Studio album by Those Darn Accordions
- Released: July 20, 2004
- Recorded: 2003–2004 at The Studio That Time Forgot, San Francisco and Garageland Studio, Port Hadlock, Washington
- Genre: Rock, pop, comedy
- Length: 40:11
- Label: Globe Records
- Producer: Paul Rogers

Those Darn Accordions chronology
Amped (2002)	Lawnball (2004)	Squeeze Machine (2007)

Lawnball is the fifth studio album by American accordion band Those Darn Accordions, released on July 20, 2004, by Globe Records. Outside of the covers included on the album, all of the original songs were written by Paul Rogers.

== Overview ==
Following the 2002 EP Amped, Lawnball marked the first TDA studio album to feature a reduced six-piece line-up following the departures of original members Linda "Big Lou" Seekins, Patty Brady, Art Peterson and Clyde Forsman. With Paul Rogers now the sole singer-songwriter of the band, Lawnball had a noticeably different musical style than TDA's previous albums, placing a primary emphasis on rock and pop songs with folk, country and jazz influences, while the prominence of the accordions were slightly downplayed and accompaniment from acoustic guitars and pianos added for a fuller studio sound.

The title of the album refers to what's also known as a yard globe, a reflective lawn ornament.

== Track listing ==
No.	Title	Writer(s)	Length
1.	"Lawnball"	P. Rogers	3:26
2.	"Live It Up"	P. Rogers	3:12
3.	"There's Another Dumbass On The Mountain"	P. Rogers	3:04
4.	"Frankenstein"	Edgar Winter	4:16
5.	"Dancing With A Dead Man"	P. Rogers	4:02
6.	"Hungover in Clover"	P. Rogers	3:05
7.	"Dr. Luv"	P. Rogers	3:19
8.	"Whole Lotta Love/Black Dog"	Jimmy Page/Robert Plant/John Paul Jones/John Bonham/Willie Dixon	4:20
9.	"My Friend Jim"	P. Rogers	3:50
10.	"Rice For One"	P. Rogers	4:28
11.	"Old Slow Guy"	P. Rogers	3:14
Total length:			40:11

== Personnel ==
Those Darn Accordions

- Paul Rogers - accordion, vocals, piano, acoustic guitar
- Suzanne Garramone - accordion, vocals
- Susie Davis - accordion, vocals, vocal arrangements
- Carri Abrahms - accordion, vocals
- Bill Schwartz - drums, percussion, vocals
- Lewis Wallace - electric bass

Additional musicians

- Adam Gabriel - dobro, banjo
- Joel Jaffe - percussion (track 6)
- Nik Phelps - trumpet
- Jim Rothermel - clarinet
