= Polkacide =

- Origin: San Francisco, California, United States
- Genres: folk punk
- Years active: 1985–2017
- Website: Polkacide.com

Polkacide was a band based in the San Francisco Bay Area that played "punk polka."

== Band history ==
Polkacide was an American band formed in 1985 in San Francisco, California. The band was originally organized to perform at a one-time event celebrating the 50th anniversary of the Deaf Club. None of the twelve original members were professional polka musicians; instead, they brought diverse musical backgrounds, including classical, rock, punk, and jazz. Clarinetist Neil Kaitner coined the band's name and designed its logo, which features a skull and crossed sausages.

The band subsequently appeared on the Doctor Demento television show and made several recordings. After 32 years together, they played a farewell concert on 8 October 2017, entitled "The Last Polka."
