= Amped (Those Darn Accordions EP) =

Clownhead

EP by Those Darn Accordions
- Released: January 22, 2002
- Recorded: 2001 at Studio D Recordings, Sausalito, California
- Genre: Rock, pop, comedy
- Length: 17:22
- Label: Globe Records
- Producer: Joel Jaffe and Those Darn Accordions

Those Darn Accordions chronology
Clownhead (1999)	Clownhead (2002)	Lawnball (2004)

Amped is an EP by American accordion band Those Darn Accordions, released on January 22, 2002, by Globe Records.

Recorded with only a five-member line-up, the smallest at that point of the band's history, Amped was a drastic stylistic departure from TDA's previous pop and polka-infused albums, featuring heavy amounts of distortion effects on their accordions to sound more like electric guitars and organs on what was the most overtly rock-oriented release in the band's discography.

Amped was the final TDA album to feature original member Patty Brady, who left the band in 2003.

== Track listing ==
No.	Title	Writer(s)	Length
1.	"Serious World"	P. Rogers/P. Brady/S. Garramone/B. Schwartz/L. Wallace	3:01
2.	"Mr. Slagle's Revenge"	P. Rogers/P. Brady/S. Garramone/B. Schwartz/L. Wallace	3:43
3.	"Magic Carpet Ride"	J. Kay/R. Moreve	2:57
4.	"Enter The Douse"	P. Rogers/P. Brady/S. Garramone/B. Schwartz/L. Wallace	2:54
5.	"Making Our Dreams Come True (Theme from Laverne & Shirley)"	C. Fox/N. Gimbel	201
6.	"Meaning of Life"	P. Rogers/P. Brady/S. Garramone/B. Schwartz/L. Wallace	2:46
Total length:			17:22

== Personnel ==
Those Darn Accordions

- Paul Rogers - vocals, accordion
- Patty Brady - accordion, vocals
- Suzanne Garramone - accordion, vocals
- Lewis Wallace - bass guitar
- Bill Schwartz - drums, percussion, vocals
