= Five by Five (band) =

Five by Five was an Arkansas based garage rock band of the late 1960s and early 1970s. They released the album Next Exit in 1968 and several singles between 1967 and 1971. All of their records were released on Paula Records. Their single Fire, a cover version of the Jimi Hendrix song, went to #52 on Billboard nationally.

Members of the band included Ronnie Plants, Bill Merritt, Tim Milam, Larry Andrews, and Doug Green.
