= Clownhead =

Studio album by Those Darn Accordions
- Released: August 10, 1999
- Recorded: 1999 at Starling Studios, Mill Valley, California
- Genre: Rock, pop, polka, funk, comedy
- Length: 45:47
- Label: Globe Records
- Producer: Paul Rogers

Those Darn Accordions chronology
| No Strings Attached (1996) | Clownhead (1999) | Amped (2002) |

Clownhead is the fourth studio album by American accordion band Those Darn Accordions, released on August 10, 1999, by Globe Records.

== Overview ==
Like most of TDA's discography, Clownhead features an eclectic assortment of genres, ranging from rock and pop to polka, funk, Tex-Mex and tango, as well as covers of War's "Low Rider" and Devo's "Uncontrollable Urge". Clownhead was the final TDA studio album to feature band founder Linda "Big Lou" Seekins, who would leave the band to focus full-time on her other musical project Big Lou's Polka Casserole, as well as the last to feature longtime members Art Peterson and Clyde Forsman, who would retire from the band in 2000 at the age of 84.

The Memphis Flyer, in a positive review of the album, wrote of the accordion sounds of Clownhead as being "fully integrated as an organic component and no longer jumps out of the mix to call attention to itself. This smoothness adds more complexity to the overall aural picture of Those Darn Accordions! as musicians first, accordion players second. Head honcho Paul Rogers knows exactly what he's doing navigating through some tricky turf, leading the band to areas of respectability where accordions are rarely found", while also praising the humor of the band's lyrics.

== Track listing ==
| No. | Title | Writer(s) | Length |
|---|---|---|---|
| 1. | "They Came For Accordions" | P. Rogers/L. Wallace | 3:44 |
| 2. | "Hippie With A Banjo" | P. Rogers | 3:27 |
| 3. | "Wall of Gum" | P. Rogers/L. Wallace | 4:18 |
| 4. | "Low Rider" | J. Goldstein | 3:45 |
| 5. | "Mucho De Nada" | P. Rogers | 2:56 |
| 6. | "Lapis Lazuli" | L. Seekins | 2:41 |
| 7. | "Love And Lies" | P. Rogers | 3:34 |
| 8. | "First Bratwurst of Summer" | P. Rogers/L. Wallace/P. Brady/C. Forsman | 3:21 |
| 9. | "Uncontrollable Urge" | M. Mothersbaugh | 3:06 |
| 10. | "Kick My Butt" | P. Rogers | 3:13 |
| 11. | "I Think About Stuff" | P. Rogers | 3:23 |
| 12. | "Clownhead" | P. Rogers/P. Brady | 3:59 |
| 13. | "Dude" | P. Rogers | 3:48 |
| Total length: | | | 45:47 |

== Personnel ==
Those Darn Accordions

- Linda "Big Lou" Seekins - accordion, background vocals
- Patty Brady - accordion, lead vocals (9), background vocals
- Clyde Forsman - accordion, lead vocals (8), background vocals
- Suzanne Garramone - accordion, bell lyre (7), background vocals
- Art Peterson - accordion, banjo (2), background vocals
- Paul Rogers - accordion, lead vocals (1–3, 5, 7, 10–13), background vocals
- Bill Schwartz - drums, percussion, lead vocals (4), background vocals
- Lewis Wallace - bass guitar, acoustic guitar (13), background vocals

Additional musicians

- Lee Vilensky - guitar (6)
- Ron Borelli - accordion (6, 7)
- Laura Rogers - background vocals (12)
