= Werner Thomas =

Swiss musician

- Born: c. 1929 (aged 96-97); Thurgau, Switzerland
- Occupations: Musician, Composer
- Instruments: Accordion

Werner Thomas (born c. 1929) is a Swiss accordionist and composer born in Thurgau.

Thomas is credited with composing the German language tune in 1957 known as "Der Ententanz" (literally "The Duck Dance") later known as the "Chicken Dance" or the "Birdie Song" while working as a restaurant musician during the 1950s, there has since been more than 400 different recorded versions.

Despite being the most popular song that Switzerland has ever produced and exported to 40 countries, in 2000, the BBC crowned Thomas' song as "voted the most annoying song of all time", ahead of The Teletubbies' "Teletubbies say "Eh-oh!"" and Aqua's "Barbie Girl."

Thomas now lives in a "luxury retirement home in Ticino".
