= Chicken Dance =

Swiss Oom-pah song and fad dance

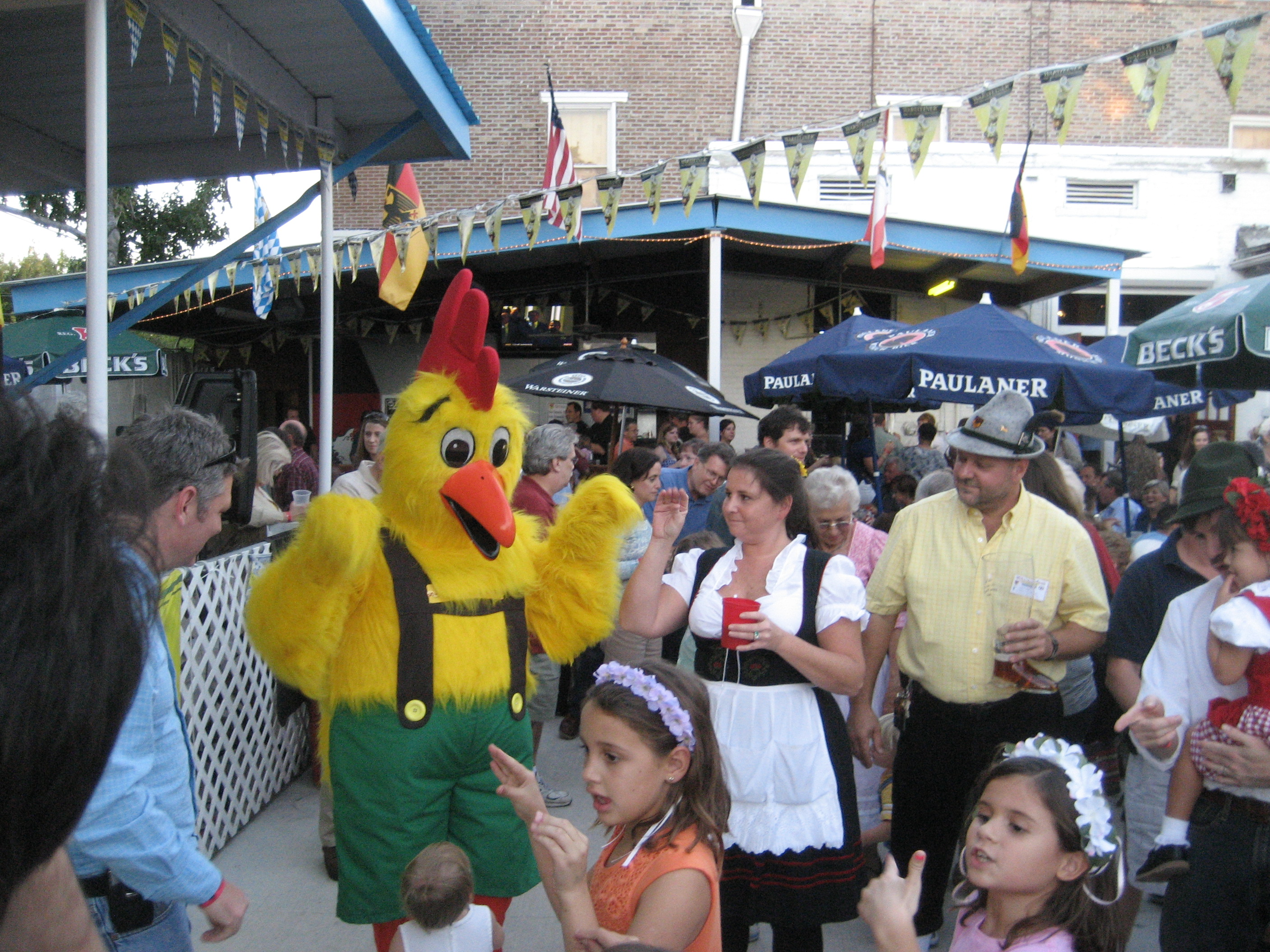
Chicken Dance with costumed performer at an Oktoberfest in 2007

The "Chicken Dance" (known originally in German as "Der Ententanz" (The Duck Dance), also known as "The Birdie Song") is an oom-pah song from 1957.

The original German language version was composed by Swiss accordionist Werner Thomas. Its melody as well as its associated fad dance has become familiar throughout the Western world.

The Chicken Dance is a well-known drinking and dancing song at American Oktoberfest events. It is also a popular dance at weddings, particularly in whose culture includes polka music.

Over 140 versions have been recorded worldwide, including some that were released by Walt Disney Records, together making an estimate of more than 40,000,000 records pressed.

== Composition ==
The piece is often notated in cut time and the key of C major. It begins with repeated dominant chords before moving into the main theme. The secondary theme features a contrasting rhythm. The two themes alternate. In some versions tempo shifts are introduced to confuse and amuse the dancers, and the final repetition of the main theme is often played as one continuous accelerando.

== Composer credits and publishing rights ==
The original name of the song was "Der Ententanz" (The Duck Dance), composed by Swiss accordionist Werner Thomas in 1957.

== Notable recordings and title changes ==
- In 1972, Swiss musician Werner Thomas first released the song under the title "Tchip Tchip".
- In 1973, Belgian band Cash & Carry created a Moog version titled "Tchip Tchip". A similar Moog version by South African musician Dan Hill followed the same year.
- In 1981, Henry Hadaway produced a version of the song, which was released in the United Kingdom as an instrumental novelty tune "The Birdie Song" by The Tweets. It peaked at number two on the UK Singles Chart in October 1981, making it the most popular version. A 1981 video from Top Of The Pops shows bird-costumed dancers miming as instrumentalists while the recording plays and young people dance on stage. This may be the earliest recording of the dance and hand-clapping. In 2000, this version was voted "the most annoying song of all time" in a poll commissioned for the Web site dotmusic.
- In 1981, the Spanish accordionist María Jesus Grados Ventura, better known as María Jesús y su Acordeón, released the song as "El Baile de los Pajaritos." This version included Spanish lyrics in both the verses and refrain.
- In 1981, the song was recorded and released in Finland by Frederik under the name "Tralalala"
- In 1981 the Italian musicians Al Bano and Romina Power recorded it as "Il ballo del Qua Qua."
- In 1981 a French recording by René Simard and Nathalie Simard was released under the title "La Danse des Canards."
- In 1982, the music producer for the Milwaukee-based organist and polka composer Bob Kames first heard "Dance Little Bird" at a German music fair. The producer sent Kames a copy, and Kames recorded his own version on the Hammond organ, as "Dance Little Bird" or "The Chicken Dance" and released it that same year. The Kames recording hit solid gold when it was released in 1983 in Poland, selling 300,000 copies. Kames received 2 of the 35 cents from each sale. Since he could not take the money out of the country, he donated all of it to a relief fund. The success of the song stunned Kames. He commented in a 1995 interview, "This stupid little thing, it's infectious. It has only two chords, it doesn't even change for the bridge. It implants the melody in people's minds—it just sticks in there. That's gotta be the secret ... It just keeps on going. People come up to me at jobs and tell me how happy it makes them. You get a song like this once in a lifetime." Kames became known as "The Chicken Dance King" and performed the song live at hundreds of festivals with fellow musicians like Lawrence Welk and Frankie Yankovic, as well as his own children, Bob Jr. and Barbara Kames.
- In 1982, the polka-themed cover band "The Emeralds", from Edmonton, Alberta, Canada, released their version on K-Tel records. The album that included it, "Bird Dance," was advertised heavily on television, and the ad featured a bird-costumed dancer among a group performing the dance. The album went double-platinum in Canada, and gold in Australia. The song also contributed to the success of multiple gold albums for the Emeralds in 1983 and 1984.
- In 1984, the song was translated to Brazilian Portuguese by Edgard Poças, from children's music group Turma do Balão Mágico, and was included in the Brazilian soundtrack of Mexican TV series Chispita. In the same year, Gugu Liberato released his second compact album with the song, entitled as "Baile dos Passarinhos" ("Little Birds' Ball"), becoming an instant success in Brazil and the most famous version of the song in the country.
- In 1990 an electronic remix was released by the Belgian band Brussels Sound Revolution as "La Danse Des Canards / De Vogeltjesdans".
- In 1990, the Dutch band Grandmaster Chicken and DJ Duck released the song as "Check Out the Chicken", which peaked at number 16 in Australia.

== Notable events ==
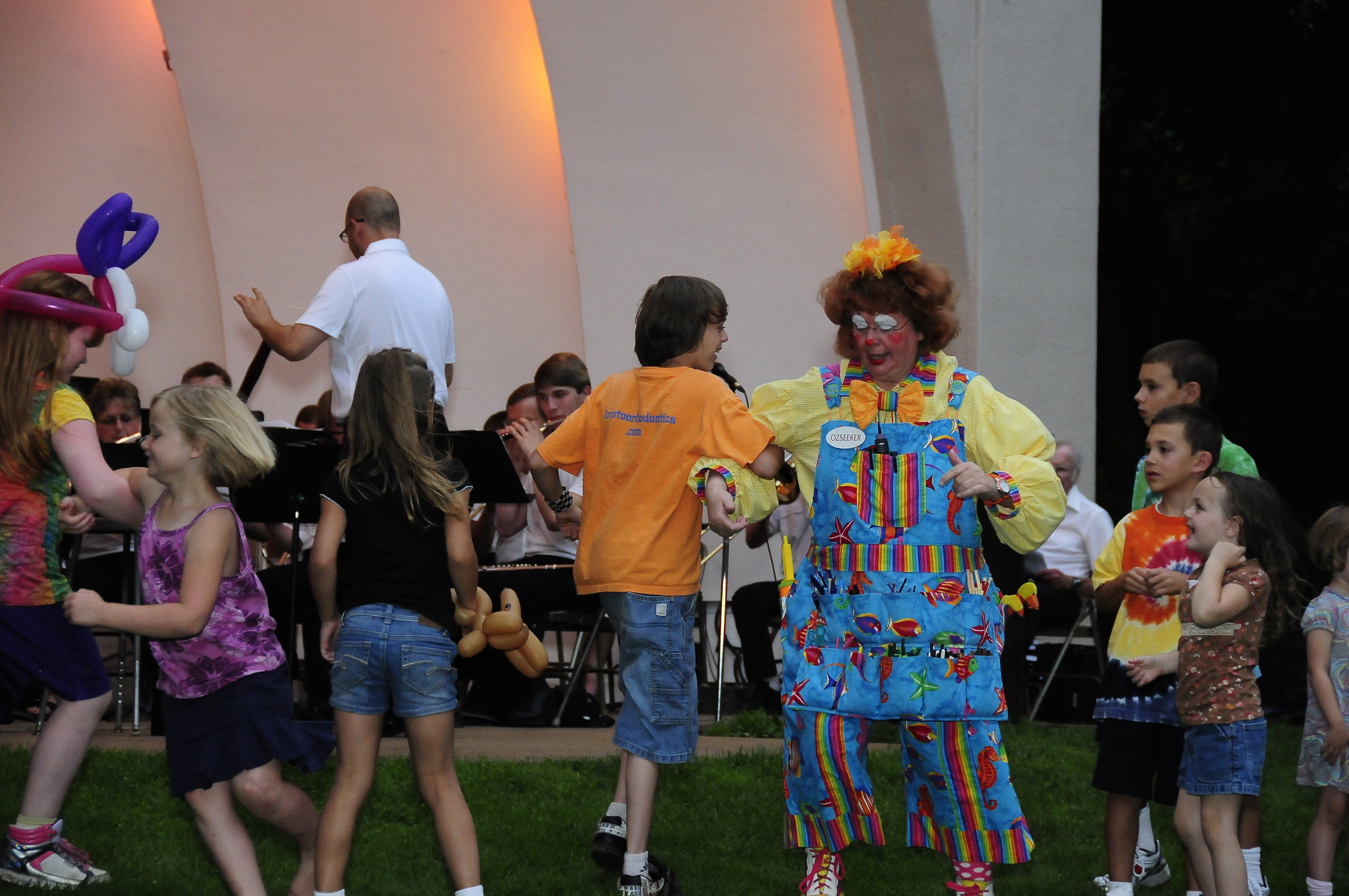
Ozseeker the Clown doing the Chicken Dance at a Municipal Band concert in Eau Claire, Wisconsin, in 2010

- In 1981, the song and its dance were performed during the Tulsa, Oklahoma, Oktoberfest. A local television station provided a chicken costume for the use of a dancer at the festival, in keeping with the costumed performances by The Tweets in England, and this costume is said to have been what gave the "Chicken Dance" its American name.
- On 13 November 2009, CIHT-FM in Ottawa played the Chicken Dance continuously until 389 tickets for the CHEO Dream of a Lifetime were purchased at CA$100 each, to support the Children's Hospital of Eastern Ontario. This played for over 3 hours.
- On 23 April 2010, in a fundraiser for Helen DeVos Children's Hospital, an attempt at the world's largest chicken dance record was held at Byron Center, Michigan, at Jake's restaurant, the site of a giant plastic chicken sculpture.
- During the 2015–16 season, NHL club Philadelphia Flyers had the chicken dance played over the PA system at the Wells Fargo Center every time the Flyers scored four goals in that game. The Flyers had a partnership with Chick-Fil-A where customers could get free breakfast sandwiches from Chick-Fil-A the day after every game where the Flyers scored four goals or more.
- During Sanremo 2024, conductors Amadeus and Fiorello had the Chicken Dance played and performed with actor John Travolta.

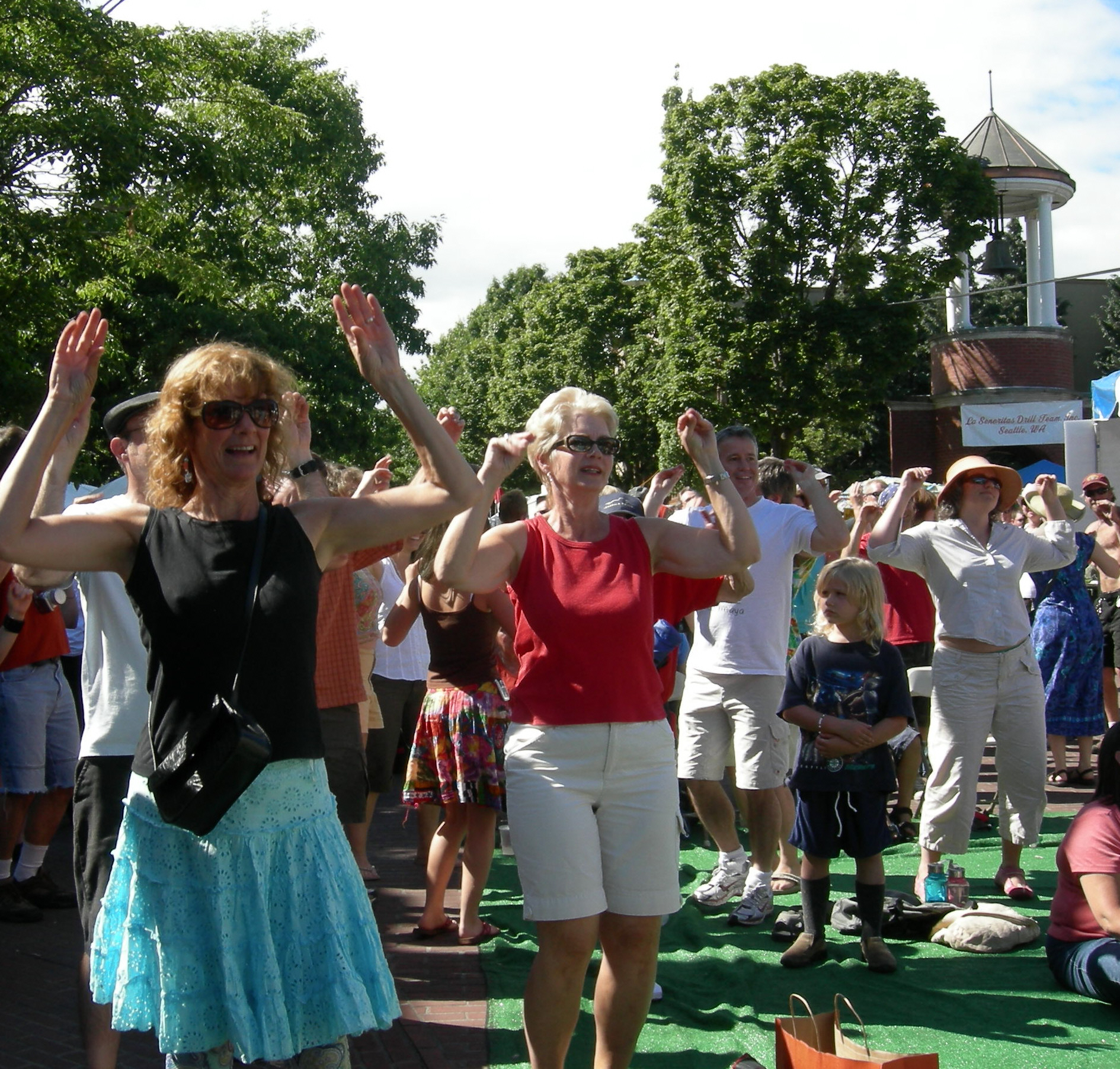
A crowd doing the beak-opening movement of Chicken Dance at the Ballard Seafood Festival in 2007

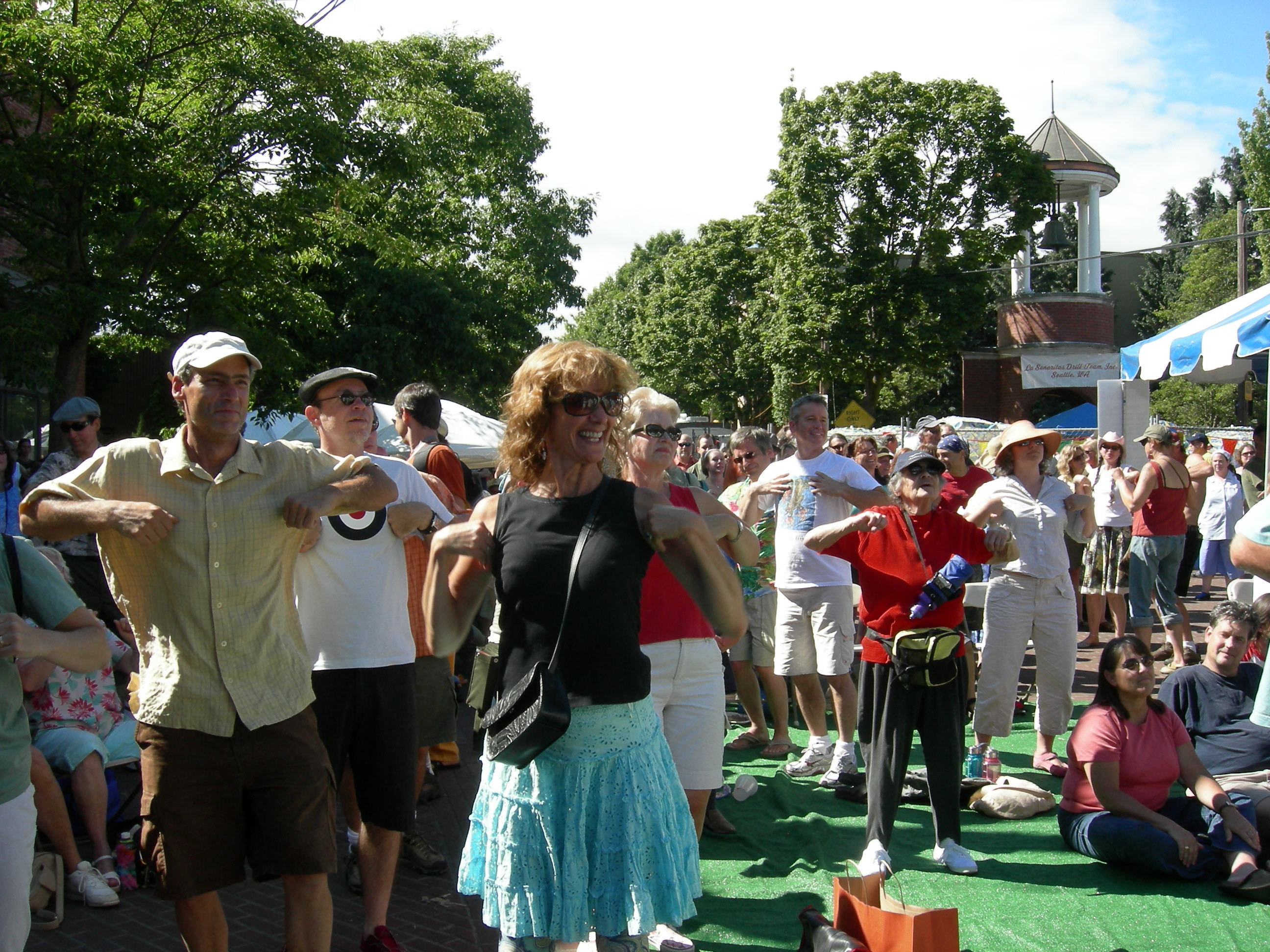
The wing-flapping movement

== Dance Like a Chicken Day ==
May 14th is recognized as "Dance Like a Chicken Day." This is celebrated as a day to do the dance.

== See also ==
- Schuhplattler
- List of polka artists
